= The Living End discography =

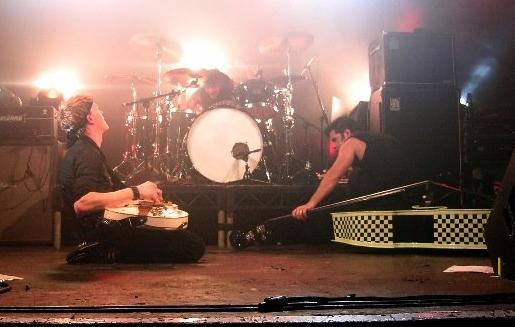
- The Living End in 2007 at Electric Ballroom, London. Left to right: Chris Cheney, Andy Strachan, Scott Owen
- Studio albums: 9
- Extended plays: 7
- Compilation albums: 3
- Singles: 26
- Video albums: 4
- Music videos: 26

The discography of the Living End, an Australian punk rock and psychobilly group, consists of nine studio albums, twenty-six singles, six extended plays (EPs), four video albums and three compilation albums. Chris Cheney, Scott Owen and Joe Piripitzi formed the Living End in 1994; their debut release was Hellbound, an eight-track EP, in 1995. The group's first single, "From Here on In", was issued in 1996 from their second EP, It's for Your Own Good, which received airplay on Triple J, an Australian radio station. Soon after, Piripitzi was replaced on drums by Travis Demsey. The band's breakthrough hit occurred in 1997 with "Second Solution / Prisoner of Society", a double A-side single/EP, (Note: Different sources describe "Second Solution / Prisoner of Society" as a double A-sided single, or as an EP. It appeared on the ARIA Singles Chart.) which became the highest-selling Australian-made single of the 1990s. It peaked at number four and spent 47 weeks in the ARIA Top 50 Singles chart, and charted in the top 30 of the United States' Hot Modern Rock Tracks chart.

In 1998, the Living End signed with Modular Recordings and released their debut album, The Living End. It peaked at number one on the Australian Albums Chart and was certified four times-platinum by the Australian Recording Industry Association (ARIA) – indicating shipment of 280,000 copies in Australia. Six tracks from the debut album were issued as singles and, as of September 2015, it remains the Living End's most commercially successful album. Their second album, Roll On (2000), provided the singles "Pictures in the Mirror" and "Roll On". It peaked at number eight and received a platinum certification. Andy Strachan replaced Dempsey on drums in 2002. Modern Artillery was the band's third album, released in 2003, which peaked at number three. It achieved gold status in Australia, making it their lowest-selling album to date.

The band returned to the number-one position on the Australian Albums Chart in 2006 with their fourth album, State of Emergency. It included two more top 10 singles, "Wake Up" and "What's on Your Radio?", which charted at number five and nine respectively. In 2008, they released a fifth studio album, White Noise, along with a double A-side single, "White Noise / How Do We Know?". The album debuted at number two on the Australian Albums Chart and achieved a gold accreditation. The title track reached number twelve in its third week and was eventually certified platinum. White Noise is the group's highest-charting album on the Official New Zealand Music Chart, where it reached number 18. The group's sixth studio album, The Ending Is Just the Beginning Repeating (2011), reached number three in Australia and was also certified gold there.

== Albums ==
=== Studio albums ===
List of studio albums, with selected chart positions and certifications
| Title | Album details | Peak chart positions | | | | | Certifications (sales thresholds) |
| Title | Album details | AUS | NZ | UK Rock | US Heat. | US Ind. | Certifications (sales thresholds) |
|---|---|---|---|---|---|---|---|
| The Living End | Released: 12 October 1998; Label: Modular (MODCD001); Formats: CD, LP | 1 | 27 | — | 33 | — | ARIA: 4× Platinum |
| Roll On | Released: 19 November 2000; Label: EMI (724353017224); Formats: CD | 8 | 34 | 24 | 22 | — | ARIA: Platinum |
| Modern Artillery | Released: 28 October 2003; Label: EMI (724359399324); Formats: CD | 3 | 46 | — | 37 | — | ARIA: Gold |
| State of Emergency | Released: 4 February 2006; Label: EMI (094635298529); Formats: CD, LP | 1 | 31 | — | 38 | 42 | ARIA: Platinum |
| White Noise | Released: 19 July 2008; Label: Dew Process (DEW900076); Formats: CD, LP | 2 | 18 | — | — | — | ARIA: Platinum |
| The Ending Is Just the Beginning Repeating | Released: 22 July 2011; Label: Dew Process (DEW9000353); Formats: CD, LP, DD | 3 | 36 | — | — | — | ARIA: Gold |
| Shift | Released: 13 May 2016; Label: Dew Process; Formats: CD, LP, DD | 4 | — | — | — | — | |
| Wunderbar | Released: 28 September 2018; Label: BMG; Formats: CD, LP, DD | 3 | — | — | — | — | |
| I Only Trust Rock n Roll | Released: 26 September 2025; Label: BMG; Formats: CD, LP, DD | 5 | — | — | — | — | |
"—" denotes releases that did not chart or were not released in that territory.

=== Compilation albums ===
List of compilation albums, with selected chart positions and certifications
| Title | Album details | Peak chart positions | Certifications (sales thresholds) |
| Title | Album details | AUS | Certifications (sales thresholds) |
|---|---|---|---|
| From Here on In: The Singles 1997–2004 | Released: 26 September 2004; Label: EMI (8745032); Formats: CD | 10 | ARIA: Gold |
| Rarities | Released: 15 November 2008; Label: Dew Process (DEW9000131); Formats: CD, digital download | — | |
| Blow Your Loudspeaker | Released: 2014; Label: [Modern Syndrome Records]; Formats: CD; Note: Limited edition (500 copies) | — | |
"—" denotes releases that did not chart or were not released in that territory.

== Extended plays ==
List of extended plays, with selected chart positions and certifications
| Title | EP details | Peak chart positions | Certifications (sales thresholds) |
| Title | EP details | AUS | Certifications (sales thresholds) |
|---|---|---|---|
| Hellbound | Released: 1995; Label: Independent/MDS (LIVING END 01); Format: CD | — | |
| It's for Your Own Good | Released: 11 November 1996; Label: Rapido Records (RAP021); Format: CD | 99 | |
| Second Solution / Prisoner of Society | Released: 8 September 1997; Label: Rapido Records (RAP027); Format: CD | 4 | ARIA: 2× Platinum |
| Best of the B-Sides | Released: November 1999; Label: Modular Recordings (LIVING0999); Format: CD; Note: Rolling Stone magazine give-away | — | |
| The Juice | Released: November 2000; Label: EMI; Format: CD; Note: Juice Magazine give-away | — | |
| Four on the Floor | Released: 17 February 2004; Label: Reprise; Format: CD, digital download; Note: limited edition | — | |
"—" denotes a release that did not chart or was not issued in that region.

== Singles ==
List of singles, with selected chart positions and certifications
| Title | Year | Peak chart positions | | | | | | Certifications (sales thresholds) | Album |
| Title | Year | AUS | AUS Alt. | CZ Rock | NZ | UK | US Alt. | Certifications (sales thresholds) | Album |
|---|---|---|---|---|---|---|---|---|---|
| "From Here on In" (Note: "From Here on In" was the lead track from the It's for Your Own Good EP, which charted on the ARIA singles chart. "Rising Sun" was issued as a radio-only single.) | 1996 | — | — | — | — | — | — | | It's for Your Own Good |
| "Second Solution / Prisoner of Society" | 1997 | 4 | — | — | 28 | — | — | ARIA: 2× Platinum | The Living End |
| "Prisoner of Society" (Note: "Prisoner of Society" was issued as a single in United Kingdom and United States. "Trapped" was issued as a single in United States.) | 1997 | — | — | — | — | 179 | 23 | | The Living End |
| "Save the Day" | 1998 | 22 | — | — | — | — | — | ARIA: Gold | The Living End |
| "All Torn Down" | 1999 | 12 | — | — | 29 | — | — | ARIA: Gold | The Living End |
| "West End Riot" | 1999 | 83 | — | — | — | — | — | | The Living End |
| "Trapped" | 1999 | — | — | — | — | — | — | | The Living End |
| "Pictures in the Mirror" | 2000 | 18 | 1 | — | — | — | — | | Roll On |
| "Roll On" | 2001 | 15 | 2 | — | — | 148 | 33 | | Roll On |
| "Dirty Man" | 2001 | 86 | 9 | — | — | — | — | | Roll On |
| "One Said to the Other / What Would You Do?" | 2002 | 19 | — | — | — | — | — | | Modern Artillery |
| "Who's Gonna Save Us?" | 2003 | 37 | — | — | — | — | 26 | | Modern Artillery |
| "Tabloid Magazine" | 2004 | 56 | — | — | — | — | — | | Modern Artillery |
| "I Can't Give You What I Haven't Got" | 2004 | — | — | — | — | — | — | | From Here on In: The Singles |
| "What's on Your Radio?" | 2005 | 9 | — | — | — | — | — | | State of Emergency |
| "Wake Up" | 2006 | 5 | — | — | 12 | — | — | | State of Emergency |
| "Long Live the Weekend" | 2006 | 23 | — | — | — | — | — | | State of Emergency |
| "Nothing Lasts Forever" | 2006 | 39 | — | — | — | — | — | | State of Emergency |
| "White Noise" | 2008 | 12 | — | — | 26 | — | — | ARIA: Platinum | White Noise |
| "Moment in the Sun" | 2008 | 100 | — | — | — | — | — | | White Noise |
| "Raise the Alarm" | 2009 | 68 | — | — | — | — | — | | White Noise |
| "The Ending Is Just the Beginning Repeating" | 2011 | 91 | — | — | — | — | — | | The Ending Is Just the Beginning Repeating |
| "Song for the Lonely" | 2011 | — | — | — | — | — | — | | The Ending Is Just the Beginning Repeating |
| "Lay Down Your Guns" (with Jimmy Barnes) | 2014 | — | — | — | — | — | — | | 30:30 Hindsight |
| "Keep On Running" | 2016 | — | — | — | — | — | — | | Shift |
| "Staring Down the Barrel" | 2016 | — | — | — | — | — | — | | Shift |
| "Monkey" | 2016 | — | — | — | — | — | — | | Shift |
| "Don't Lose It" | 2018 | — | — | 17 | — | — | — | | Wunderbar |
| "Amsterdam" | 2018 | — | — | — | — | — | — | | Wunderbar |
| "Otherside" | 2018 | — | — | — | — | — | — | | Wunderbar |
| "Alfie" | 2025 | — | — | — | — | — | — | | I Only Trust Rock n Roll |
| "Strange Place" | 2025 | — | — | — | — | — | — | | I Only Trust Rock n Roll |
| "I Only Trust Rock n Roll" | 2025 | — | — | — | — | — | — | | I Only Trust Rock n Roll |
| "Misery" | 2025 | — | — | — | — | — | — | | I Only Trust Rock n Roll |
"—" denotes releases that did not chart or were not released in that territory.

== Other appearances ==
List of other song appearances
| Year | Song title | Album | Notes |
|---|---|---|---|
| 1999 | "Girls on Film" | Undone: The Songs of Duran Duran | A tribute album to Duran Duran |
| 2005 | "Leilani" | Stoneage Cameos | A tribute album to Hoodoo Gurus |
| 2005 | "Live It Up" | Timor Leste: Freedom Rising | A charity album by various artists for "environmental, health and education projects in East Timor" |
| 2007 | "Rising Sun" | Standing on the Outside: The Songs of Cold Chisel | A tribute album to Cold Chisel |
| 2008 | "Guitar Band" | Easy Fever | A tribute album to the Easybeats and Stevie Wright |
| 2011 | "Hot Potato" | ReWiggled - A Tribute to the Wiggles | A tribute album to the Wiggles |
| 2013 | "Say Goodbye" | Crucible – The Songs of Hunters & Collectors | A tribute album to Hunters & Collectors |
| 2024 | "No Secrets" – (with Doc Neeson), "All Torn Down", "West End Riots" and "Jingle Bell Rock" (with Kylie Minogue) | Tour of Duty – Concert for the Troops (Live in Dili 1999) | A benefit concert held in 1999, and released in 2024 |

== Videos ==
=== Video albums ===
List of video albums, with selected chart positions and certifications
| Title | Album details | Peak chart positions | Certifications (sales thresholds) |
| Title | Album details | AUS | Certifications (sales thresholds) |
|---|---|---|---|
| From Here on In: The Singles (1997–2004) | Released: 27 September 2004; Label: EMI (RCSDVD01); Format: DVD | 3 | ARIA: Platinum |
| How to Make an Album and Influence People | Released: 4 February 2006; Label: EMI (3533522); Format: DVD; Note: Included as a bonus DVD with State of Emergency | — | |
| Live at Festival Hall | Released: 30 September 2006; Label: EMI (3754659); Format: DVD | 3 | ARIA: Gold |
| Live at ACDC Lane | Released: 19 July 2008; Label: Dew Process; Format: DVD; Note: Included as a limited edition DVD with White Noise | — | |
"—" denotes releases that did not chart or were not released in that territory.

=== Music videos ===
List of music videos, with directors
| Year | Title | Director(s) |
|---|---|---|
| 1998 | "Prisoner of Society" | Jason Tutty |
| 1998 | "Second Solution" | Jason Tutty, Ryan Renshaw |
| 1998 | "All Torn Down" | Jason Tutty, Ryan Renshaw |
| 1998 | "Save the Day" | Joel Noble |
| 1999 | "West End Riot" | Don Letts |
| 1999 | "Prisoner of Society" (American release) | Jamie Stern |
| 2000 | "Pictures in the Mirror" | Mark Hartley |
| 2000 | "Roll On" | Marcos Siega |
| 2001 | "Roll On" (American release) | Mark Hartley |
| 2001 | "Dirty Man" | Morgan Evans |
| 2002 | "One Said to the Other" | Morgan Evans |
| 2003 | "Who's Gonna Save Us?" | Unknown (Note: The footage for the Australian version of "Who's Gonna Save Us?" was taken from their performance at Splendour in the Grass in 2003. The band recorded video footage of seven songs at that gig for a bonus limited edition DVD which was released with Modern Artillery (October 2003).) |
| 2004 | "Who's Gonna Save Us?" (American version) | Mark Kohr |
| 2004 | "Tabloid Magazine" | Todd Sheldrick |
| 2004 | "I Can't Give You What I Haven't Got" | Jason Tutty |
| 2006 | "What's on Your Radio?" | Sean Gilligan, Sarah-Jane Woulahan |
| 2006 | "Wake Up" | Sean Gilligan, Sarah-Jane Woulahan |
| 2006 | "Long Live the Weekend" | Sean Gilligan, Sarah-Jane Woulahan |
| 2007 | "Rising Sun" | Bart Borghesi |
| 2007 | "Nothing Lasts Forever" | Morgan Christie |
| 2008 | "White Noise" | Grant Marshall |
| 2008 | "Moment in the Sun" | Simon Ozolins (Note: In 2008 Simon Ozolins won the Australian Cinematographers Society's Gold Cinematography Award in the Music Clips category (Victoria and Tasmania) for his work with the Living End.) |
| 2009 | "Raise the Alarm" | Unknown (Note: The footage for "Raise the Alarm" includes material from the band's Splendour in the Grass performance in 2008, a gig at the Enmore Theatre and behind the scenes footage of the band recording the related album, White Noise (July 2008).) |
| 2011 | "The Ending is Just the Beginning Repeating" | Christopher Frey |
| 2011 | "Song for the Lonely" | Rhett Dashwood |
| 2012 | "For Another Day" | Jeremy Santolin |
| 2016 | "Keep On Running" | Tiberiu Bogdan Dumitrescu |
| 2016 | "Staring Down the Barrel" | Unknown |
| 2018 | "Don't Lose It" | Jarred Lammiman |
| 2019 | "Not Like the Other Boys" | Daniel Cooper, Reid McManus |
"—" denotes a director that is not available through reliable sources.
