= Live at Festival Hall =

Video by The Living End
- Released: 30 September 2006 (Australia)
- Recorded: 19 May 2006 at Festival Hall, Melbourne Australia
- Genres: Punk rock, rockabilly
- Length: 98:36
- Label: EMI (2006)
- Director: Bernie Zelvis
- Producer: Ashley Warn

The Living End chronology
From Here on In: The DVD 1997–2004 (2004)	Live at Festival Hall (2006)

Live at Festival Hall is a video album by Australian rock band The Living End. It was released in September 2006 and captures the band's State of Emergency tour concert on 19 May 2006 at Melbourne's Festival Hall.

The album peaked at No. 3 on the Australian ARIA Top 40 DVD Chart and was certified gold by ARIA by the end of the year for the shipment of over 7,500 copies.

== Track listing ==
All listed tracks were played at this show and throughout the tour. Tracks written by Chris Cheney, except track 9 (Cheney & Scott Owen) and track 14 (Cheney, Owen & Travis Demsey).

1. What's on Your Radio? (from State of Emergency)
2. Second Solution (from The Living End)
3. I Can't Give You What I Haven't Got (from From Here on In)
4. Who's Gonna Save Us? (from Modern ARTillery)
5. Save the Day (from The Living End)
6. One Step Behind (from State of Emergency)
7. Black Cat (from State of Emergency)
8. All Torn Down (from The Living End)
9. EP Medley
  - From Here On In (from It's for Your Own Good)
  - The Living End (from Hellbound)
  - English Army (from It's for Your Own Good)
  - Hellbound (from Hellbound)
  - Strange (from Hellbound)
10. Prisoner of Society (from The Living End)
11. Til the End (from State of Emergency)
12. E-Boogie
13. Long Live the Weekend (from State of Emergency)
14. Uncle Harry (from Roll On)
15. Roll On (from Roll On)
16. Wake Up (from State of Emergency)
17. West End Riot (from The Living End)

=== Bonus music videos ===
1. What's on Your Radio?
2. Wake Up
3. Long Live the Weekend
4. Nothing Lasts Forever

== Charts ==
Chart (2006)	Peak position
Australian DVD Chart (ARIA Charts)	3

== Certifications ==
Region	Certification	Certified units/sales
Australia (ARIA)	Gold	7,500^{^}
^{^} Shipments figures based on certification alone.
