= From Here on In (The Living End album) =

From Here on In: The Singles 1997–2004

Compilation album by The Living End
- Released: 27 September 2004
- Studio: Sing Sing Studios, Melbourne
- Length: 45:54
- Label: EMI

The Living End chronology
Modern ARTillery (2003)	From Here on In: The Singles 1997–2004 (2004)	State of Emergency (2006)

From Here on In: The Singles 1997–2004 is a singles compilation album by Australian punk rock band The Living End, released in September 2004. It features new tracks, recorded at Sing Sing Studios in Melbourne, remasterings of older tracks and a bonus disc featuring some of the band's most successful cover songs.

Alongside this release, a DVD comprising a two-hour documentary and the band's music videos, From Here on In: The DVD 1997–2004, was also released.

== Track listing ==
Credits adapted from CD liner notes.

All tracks are written by Chris Cheney.

No.	Title	Producer	Length
1.	"I Can't Give You What I Haven't Got"	Paul McKercher	2:19
2.	"Prisoner of Society"	Lindsay Gravina	3:54
3.	"Roll On"	Nick Launay	3:09
4.	"West End Riot"	Lindsay Gravina, The Living End	3:54
5.	"Second Solution"	Lindsay Gravina	3:11
6.	"Bringin' It All Back Home"	Paul McKercher	3:17
7.	"All Torn Down"	Lindsay Gravina, The Living End	4:10
8.	"Pictures in the Mirror"	Nick Launay	3:19
9.	"From Here on In"	Lindsay Gravina	2:42
10.	"Save the Day"	Lindsay Gravina, The Living End	2:57
11.	"Who's Gonna Save Us?"	Mark Trombino	3:23
12.	"One Said to the Other"	Mark Trombino	2:49
13.	"Dirty Man"	Nick Launay	3:36
14.	"Tabloid Magazine"	Mark Trombino	3:22

=== Under the Covers (Bonus CD) ===
No.	Title	Writer(s)	Recorded By	Length
1.	"Sunday Bloody Sunday"	P. Hewson, D. Evans, A. Clayton, L Mullen Jnr	Craig Harnath	3:54
2.	"Tainted Love"	Ed Cobb		4:27
3.	"I Get a Kick Out of You"	Cole Porter	Magoo	2:40
4.	"Rip It Up"	D. Blackwell, John Marascalco	Craig Harnath	2:20
5.	"10.15 Saturday Night"	Michael Dempsey, Robert Smith, Lol Tolhurst	Lindsay Gravina, assisted by Mike Alonso	4:54
6.	"Prisoner on the Inside"	Allan Caswell	Lindsay Gravina	2:27

== Singles ==
- "I Can't Give You What I Haven't Got", 2004 radio single, Triple J Hottest 100, 2004 #47

== Charts ==
Chart (2004)	Peak position
Australian Albums (ARIA)	10

== Certifications ==
Region	Certification	Certified units/sales
Australia (ARIA)	Gold	35,000^{^}
^{^} Shipments figures based on certification alone.

== See also ==
- From Here on In: The DVD 1997–2004
