= Four on the Floor (EP) =

EP by The Living End
- Released: 17 February 2004
- Genre: Punk rock, Psychobilly
- Length: 11:42
- Label: Reprise Records

The Living End chronology
Second Solution / Prisoner of Society (1997)	Four on the Floor (2004)

Four on the Floor is the fourth EP by Australian punk rock band The Living End. It was released in February 2004, seven years after their previous EP, Second Solution / Prisoner of Society, which had spent a record-breaking 69 weeks on the Australian ARIA Charts Top 50.

== Track listing ==
No.	Title	Length
1.	"Blinded"	2:58
2.	"Fond Farewell"	1:45
3.	"No Reaction (Demo)"	3:16
4.	"Live It Up"	3:43
Total length:		11:42

== Personnel ==
- Chris Cheney - guitars and vocals
- Scott Owen - double bass and backing vocals
- Travis Demsey - drums and backing vocals
