= Roll On =

Roll On may refer to:

- Roll On (The Living End album)
  - "Roll On" (The Living End song)
- Roll On (Alabama album)
  - "Roll On (Eighteen Wheeler)"
- Roll On (JJ Cale album)
- "Roll On" (Kid Rock song)
- "Roll On" (Mis-Teeq song)
- "Roll On", a song by Dierks Bentley from the album Gravel & Gold
