= From Here on In =

From Here on In may refer to:

- From Here on In (The Living End album), 2004
  - From Here on In (video album), 2004
- From Here on In (South album), 2001
