= It's for Your Own Good =

It's for Your Own Good may refer to:

- It's for Your Own Good (EP), by Australian rock band, The Living End
- It's for Your Own Good (film), Spanish film
