= Wheelers Hill Secondary College =

Location
- Wheelers Hill, Victoria; Australia; 37°54′36.34″S 145°10′52.84″E

Information
- Type: Public
- Motto: "Creating Futures Together"
- Established: 1980
- Principal: Fern Brisbane
- Grades: 7–12
- Enrolment: 698
- Colours: Maroon and blue
- Yearbook: The Hill
- Website: www.whsc.vic.edu.au

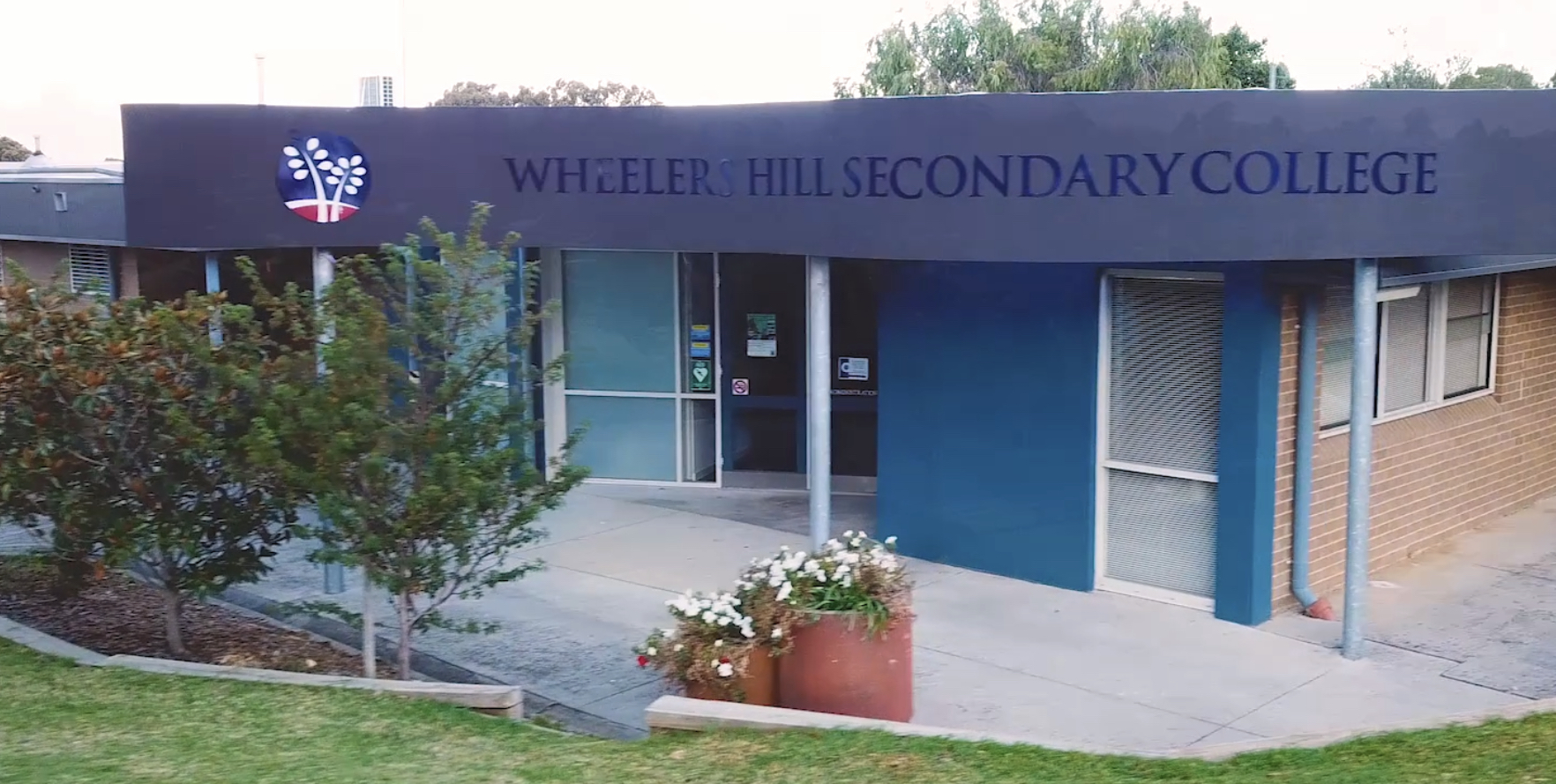

Wheelers Hill Secondary College is a coeducational state school in the Melbourne suburb of Wheelers Hill, Victoria, Australia. School number 8474.

The College is divided into two sub-schools and six Year levels: Middle School (Years 7–9) and Senior School (Years 10–12).

== History ==
Wheelers Hill Secondary College is a government state high school, situated in the City of Monash in Melbourne's eastern suburbs. Established in 1980 as Wheelers Hill High School, the school originally opened with 96 students and nine teachers. The College currently has an enrolment of 700 students from Years 7 to 12.

== Facilities ==
The school's grounds include:

- A canteen
- A food technology centre
- A gymnasium
- The Bunjil Performing Arts Centre
- A library
- An art and technology wing
- Science laboratories

=== Sporting facilities ===
The school's grounds include:

- An AFL and cricket oval
- Two football ovals
- Two netball/basketball/tennis courts
- Passive recreation areas in garden settings

== Curriculum ==
The school has a number of programs that support its core values of excellence, respect, and creativity. Programs such as instrumental music, performing arts, Swimming and Athletics Carnivals, and inter-school sporting programs provide opportunities for students to develop particular skills outside the mainstream classroom. The College has a strong pastoral care program supported by a Student Welfare Coordinator, Home Groups, and Sub-School teams at each Year level. The College's pastoral programs complement the strong academic and creative traditions of the College. The College places a strong emphasis on development and nurturing of leadership skills is a focus of Wheelers Hill Secondary College, and programs such as Year level camps, the Student Representative Council and Vocational Major programs are in place to enable this.

== Houses ==
The four houses are:

- Jells – Blue
- Derrimut – Yellow
- Napier – Red
- Scott – Green

== Notable alumni ==
- Chris Cheney, vocals, guitar of The Living End
- Scott Owen, double bass, vocals of the Living End
- Camilla Severi, from Big Brother Australia 2006
- Kayne Tremills, TV Host

== See also ==
- List of schools in Victoria
