= Prisoner of Society =

Song by the Living End

Single by the Living End

from the album The Living End
- Released: 5 January 1999
- Studio: Sing Sing Studios (Melbourne)
- Genre: Punk rock
- Length: 3:54
- Label: Reprise
- Songwriter: Chris Cheney
- Producers: Lindsay Gravina; The Living End

The Living End singles chronology
| "Save the Day" (1998) | "Prisoner of Society" (1999) | "All Torn Down" (1999) |

Music videos
- "Prisoner of Society" on YouTube

"Prisoner of Society" is a song by Australian punk rock band the Living End. It was originally released in Australia on the 1997 EP Second Solution / Prisoner of Society. The song was later released as a single, separate from the EP, in the United States in January 1999. In January 2018, as part of Triple M's "Ozzest 100", "Prisoner of Society" was ranked number 32.

== Background ==
The Living End had achieved mainstream success with the release of their third EP, Second Solution / Prisoner of Society, in September 1997. It peaked at No. 4 on the ARIA Singles Chart and spent 69 weeks within the ARIA Top 100. "Prisoner of Society" also reached No. 15 on Triple J's Hottest 100 for 1997.

== Lyrics ==
"It's basically my take of 'My Generation' or 'Summertime Blues'. The lyrics are, 'screw society, screw mum and dad, this is young people's music' and I wanted to put that as simply as I could. It was me grabbing that influence of the early 1950s and the rebellion of something like a Chuck Berry song into something that we did. Obviously we didn't think at the time that it would become the biggest selling single of the 1990s" - Chris Cheney

== Legacy ==
Double J named it in the top twenty Australian songs of the 1990s, saying it, "hits you in the guts, right from the first few bars. It's got the kind of chorus that makes you want to sing (scream) every. single. word. Especially the part about being a brat and talking back. And that breakdown 2 minutes in? Just a great excuse to jump around really."

In January 1999, "Prisoner of Society" was released as a radio single in the United States, where it peaked at No. 23 on the Billboard Modern Rock Tracks chart. Eight months later, it was released in the United Kingdom as a stand-alone single but did not reach the top 100. In 2025, it placed 41 in the Triple J Hottest 100 of Australian Songs.

== Track listing ==
All tracks are written by Chris Cheney.

| No. | Title | Length |
|---|---|---|
| 1. | "Prisoner of Society" | 3:54 |
| 2. | "Mr Business Man" | 2:39 |
| 3. | "Sleep on It" | 2:39 |

Recorded and engineered by Lindsay Gravina at Sing Sing Studios (Melbourne). Mixed by Jerry Finn at The Mastering Lab (Los Angeles).

== Personnel ==
- Chris Cheney – guitar, vocals
- Scott Owen – upright bass, backing vocals
- Travis Demsey – drums, backing vocals

== Charts ==
=== Weekly charts ===
| Chart (1998–1999) | Peak position |
|---|---|
| Australia (ARIA) "Second Solution" / "Prisoner of Society" | 4 |
| New Zealand (Recorded Music NZ) "Second Solution" / "Prisoner of Society" | 28 |
| US Modern Rock Tracks (Billboard) | 23 |

=== Year-end charts ===
| Chart (1998) | Position |
|---|---|
| Australia (ARIA) | 6 |

| Chart (1999) | Position |
|---|---|
| US Modern Rock Tracks (Billboard) | 84 |

== Certifications ==
| Region | Certification | Certified units/sales |
|---|---|---|
| Australia (ARIA) | 2× Platinum | 140,000^{^} |
^{^} Shipments figures based on certification alone.

== Release history ==
| Region | Date | Format(s) | Label(s) | Ref. |
|---|---|---|---|---|
| United States | 5 January 1999 | Alternative radio | Reprise | |
| United States | 11 January 1999 | Active rock radio | Reprise | |
| United Kingdom | 6 September 1999 | CD; cassette | Reprise | |
