= The Storm Before the Calm (Chris Cheney album) =

Studio album by Chris Cheney
- Released: 17 June 2022
- Recorded: 2021–22
- Genre: Rock, rockabilly
- Length: 37:35
- Label: Liberatore
- Producer: Chris Cheney; Joey Waronker; Justin Stanley; Skylar Wilson; Wayne Connolly

Singles from The Storm Before the Calm
- 1. "California" Released: 10 March 2022; 2. "Football Team" Released: 28 April 2022; 3. "Corner Shop" Released: 26 May 2022

The Storm Before the Calm is the debut solo studio album by Australian rock artist Chris Cheney, of The Living End. The album was released on 17 June 2022, spawning three singles and was accompanied by a short national tour. The album spent one week on the ARIA Charts, peaking at number 8.

== Track listing ==
All tracks are written by Chris Cheney, except where noted.

No.	Title	Length
1.	"Impossible Dream"	4:19
2.	"California"	3:32
3.	"Football Team"	3:31
4.	"Corner Shop"	3:55
5.	"Lost in the Darkness"	4:11
6.	"The River"	3:48
7.	"Still Got Friday on My Mind"	4:04
8.	"Exile" (Cheney, Frank Tetaz)	3:53
9.	"2am"	3:57
10.	"Little White Pills"	2:23
Total length:		37:35

== Personnel ==
- Chris Cheney – vocals, guitar, bass, piano, xylophone
- Marc Orrell - piano (track 1)
- Nick Cecire - drums (tracks 2, 4, 10)
- Louis Macklin - piano (tracks 2, 4)
- Justin Schipper - pedal steel guitar (track 3)
- Skylar Wilson - piano (track 3, 8, 9)
- Justin Stanley - drums (track 5, 7), bass (track 5), piano (track 7), slide guitar (track 7)
- Joey Waronker - drums (track 6)
- Jy-Perry Banks - pedal steel guitar (track 7)
- Michael Rinne - bass (track 9)
- Dom Billett - drums (track 9)
- Jeremy Fetzer - guitar (track 9)

== Charts ==
Chart (2022)	Peak position
Australian Albums (ARIA)	8
