= West End Riot =

Single by The Living End

from the album The Living End
- Released: 26 July 1999
- Recorded: 1998
- Genre: Punk rock, punkabilly
- Length: 3:54
- Label: Modular, EMI
- Songwriter(s): Chris Cheney
- Producer(s): Lindsay Gravina

The Living End singles chronology
"All Torn Down" (1998)	"West End Riot" (1999)	"Pictures in the Mirror" (2000)

"West End Riot" is a song by Australian punk rock band The Living End. It was released in July 1999, as the fourth single from their self-titled album. It peaked at No. 83 on the Australian ARIA Singles Chart in August 1999. The song was more popular with listeners of national radio station, Triple J, appearing at No. 48 on their Hottest 100 poll for that year.

The video for the song was directed by Don Letts, (who also directed a number of The Clash's videos). It was filmed in London while the band was touring the UK.

A crowd favourite, it is often played at the end of a show, most notably at Festival Hall in 2006.

The song appears in the opening film clip for the video game World of Outlaws: Sprint Cars 2002.

== Background ==
The song title and lyrics refer two boys who are born and raised in two different areas, who play together in the streets with toy guns, but who grow up to live very different lives, with their childhood fun being nothing more than a memory. The song is based on the West and East sides of Melbourne, even though in later years the feud has died down.

I was listening to a lot of the Jam at this point. It was about kids knocking around together and how their lives part as they get older – and never the twain shall meet again. My mum and dad were both from that area [the industrial west]. Dad’s family was very poor and he told me stories about his dad sitting on the steps crying during the Depression when all the men would come home from work, because he didn’t have a job. Maybe that stuff gets into you. I always hated the idea of some people looking down on other people.

— Chris Cheney, 2012

== Track listing ==
No.	Title	Writer(s)	Length
1.	"West End Riot"	Chris Cheney	3:54
2.	"Living in Sin"	Cheney	3:48
3.	"Train Kept A-Rollin'" (live)	Myron 'Tiny' Bradshaw, Howard Kay, Lois Mann	3:41
4.	"West End Riot" (live)	Cheney	4:29

== Personnel ==
Band members

- Chris Cheney – vocals, guitar
- Travis Demsey – drums, backing vocals
- Scott Owen – double bass, backing vocals

Recording process

- Producer – Lindsay Gravina
- Engineer – Lindsay Gravina
  - Assistant engineer – Matt Voight
- Mastering – Stephen Marcussen at Precision Mastering
- Mixing – Jerry Finn
  - Assistant mixer – Mark and Tony
- Editing (digital) – Don C. Tyler
- Studios – Sing Sing Studios, Melbourne
  - Mixing studios – Conway Studios, Los Angeles

Artwork

- Cover art – Craig Preston

== Charts ==
Chart performance for "West End Riot"
Chart (1999)	Peak position
Australia (ARIA)	83

== Release history ==
Release history and formats for "West End Riot"
Region	Date	Label	Format	Catalogue
Australia	July 1999	Modular	CD	MODCS005
Australia	July 1999	EMI	CD	7243 8 87265 2 8
