= I Can't Give You What I Haven't Got =

Single by The Living End

from the album From Here on In
- Released: 2004
- Recorded: 2004
- Genre: Punk rock
- Length: 3:20
- Label: EMI
- Songwriter(s): Chris Cheney

The Living End singles chronology
"Tabloid Magazine" (2004)	"I Can't Give You What I Haven't Got" (2004)	"What's on Your Radio" (2004)

"I Can't Give You What I Haven't Got" is the single and one of two new tracks that were written by Australian punk rock band The Living End for their singles compilation album From Here on In: The Singles 1997-2004.

The song is an attack on Warner Music Group and their influence on the album Modern ARTillery. Featuring a unique sound, it is seen by many as a return to form for the band, and is a regular on live concerts.

In Australia, the song was ranked #47 on Triple J's Hottest 100 of 2004.

== Music video ==
A video clip of the song was produced and later released as part of a semi-biographical DVD album titled From Here on In: The DVD 1997-2004.
