= Four on the Floor =

Four on the Floor or 4 on the Floor may refer to:

== Art, entertainment, and media ==
=== Music ===
==== Genre ====
- Four on the floor (music), a style of dance music with a steady, uniform 4/4 beat

==== Groups ====
- The 4onthefloor, blues band from Minneapolis, Minnesota

==== Albums ====
- 4 on the Floor, an early (ca. 1988), self-produced album by Natalie MacMaster
- Four on the Floor, a 1991 live album by The Nylons
- Four on the Floor (Dag Nasty album), a 1992 album by the American band
- 4 On The Floor, a 1995 album by the eurodance group Mr. President
- Four on the Floor (compilation album), a 1999 compilation album by bands on Panic Button Records
- Four on the Floor (EP), a 2003 EP by Australian rock band The Living End
- Four on the Floor (Juliette and the Licks album), a 2006 by the American band

==== Songs ====
- "Four on the Floor" (Lee Brice song), a song by Lee Brice from Love Like Crazy
- "Four on the Floor" (Spiderbait song), a 2001 song by Spiderbait from The Flight of Wally Funk

==== Instrumental compositions ====
- Four on the Floor, 1983 composition by Libby Larsen

=== Television ===
- Four on the Floor (American TV program), a 1994 American music critic TV program that aired on VH1
- Four on the Floor (Canadian TV series), a 1986 Canadian comedy television series that aired on CBC Television

== Other uses ==
- Four on the floor (transmission), a type of four-speed manual transmission with a floor-mounted shifter
- Four on the Floor, another name for the Wonderland murders, a 1981 crime in Los Angeles

== See also ==
- Four to the floor
