= Joe Piripitzi =

Australian rock musician

- Also known as: Joe Evil
- Born: Melbourne, Victoria, Australia
- Occupation: Musician
- Instruments: Drums, percussion
- Formerly of: The Living End

Joe Piripitzi is an Australian rock musician. He was the founding drummer of the rockabilly band The Living End from 1994 to 1996, which formed in Melbourne with Chris Cheney on lead guitar and lead vocals, and Scott Owen on double bass and backing vocals. Cheney considered Piripitzi to be ideal due to his charismatic appearance. Piripitzi is recorded on their first two extended plays, Hellbound (1995) and It's for Your Own Good (November 1996).

After leaving the Living End, Piripitzi was a drummer for another Melbourne band, H-Block 101, which were a 77-punk-influenced group from October 1996 to mid-1998. He appeared on that group's second album No Room for Apathy (1997) and their EP Synergy (recorded in January 1998, but released after Piripitzi's departure).

Piripitzi later joined the Psycho Delmatics under the stage name Joe Evil.
