= Song for the Lonely (The Living End song) =

Single by The Living End

from the album The Ending Is Just the Beginning Repeating
- Released: 29 July 2011
- Recorded: 2011
- Genre: Rock
- Length: 3:13
- Label: Dew Process
- Songwriter(s): Chris Cheney
- Producer(s): Nick DiDia

The Living End singles chronology
"The Ending Is Just the Beginning Repeating" (2011)	"Song for the Lonely" (2011)	"Keep On Running" (2016)

"Song for the Lonely" is a song by Australian rock band The Living End. It is the second single from their sixth studio album The Ending Is Just the Beginning Repeating. The song was released through the iTunes Store on 29 July 2011.

== Track listing ==
All tracks written by Chris Cheney.

1. "Song for the Lonely" – 3:13
2. "Gasoline" – 2:53
