= Dirty Man =

Single by The Living End

from the album Roll On
- Released: 22 October 2001
- Recorded: 2000
- Genre: Punk rock
- Length: 3:35
- Label: EMI
- Songwriter(s): Chris Cheney
- Producer(s): Nick Launay

The Living End singles chronology
"Roll On" (2001)	"Dirty Man" (2001)	"One Said to the Other" (2003)

"Dirty Man" is a song by Australian punk rock band The Living End. It was released on 22 October 2002, as the third single from their second album, Roll On.

The single was relatively unsuccessful due to relentless touring outside Australia and the car crash of Chris Cheney in September 2001 leading to a lack of promotion.

The second track of the single, "Revolution Regained", was written by Cheney and originally performed by the band on Roll On, however for the single they included a version recorded by the Dili Allstars (an East Timorese reggae/ska band based in Melbourne). The third track is a cover of the Cole Porter song, "I Get a Kick Out of You".

== Track listing ==
No.	Title	Writer(s)	Length
1.	"Dirty Man"	Chris Cheney	3:35
2.	"Revolution Regained" (Performed by Dili Allstars)	Chris Cheney	3:26
3.	"I Get a Kick Out of You"	Cole Porter	2:38

== Charts ==
Chart performance for "Dirty Man"
Chart (2001)	Peak position
Australia (ARIA)	86
