= The Ending Is Just the Beginning Repeating =

Studio album by The Living End
- Released: 22 July 2011 (Australia, USA, Canada, Mexico, Japan)
- Recorded: Late 2010 – May 2011
- Studios: Red Door Sounds, Melbourne; 301 Studios, Byron Bay
- Genre: Alternative rock
- Length: 40:09
- Label: Dew Process
- Producer: Nick DiDia

The Living End chronology
Rarities (2008)	The Ending Is Just the Beginning Repeating (2011)	Shift (2016)

Singles from The Ending Is Just the Beginning Repeating
- 1. "The Ending Is Just the Beginning Repeating" Released: 3 June 2011; 2. "Song for the Lonely" Released: 29 July 2011

The Ending Is Just the Beginning Repeating is the sixth studio album by Australian punk rock band The Living End, released on 22 July 2011 via Dew Process. The album was produced by Nick DiDia. In 2011, it won the award for the Best Rock Album at the Australian ARIA Awards.

== Composition and recording ==
In early 2010, Chris Cheney went to New York for three months to begin writing songs for the album. While in New York, he met up with The Hold Steady singer Craig Finn, whom he met through John Agnello who had produced the band's previous album, White Noise. With Finn, he cowrote the song "The Ending Is Just the Beginning Repeating". Cheney said that for the new album he "wanted to meet different people and gather some fresh resources and influences to hopefully take my writing and add a different element".

Later in the year, the band regrouped to begin rehearsals in a South Melbourne recording studio. The band performed as The Safety Matches to road test new material. Cheney said that they had performed "a week's worth of gigs playing only new songs to see which ones would sink or swim" and that they had recorded fewer studio demos than for previous albums. They then went into the studio to record the album. They spent four or five weeks in Byron Bay and a further two to three weeks recording in Melbourne.

Cheney said that the album took "like a year and a half of writing" and that they always seem to "go through 30-40 songs" in rehearsal. He said that during writing the album they had "amassed something in the vicinity of 40-plus songs to choose from". During the writing stage he said he would be "working on 30 songs at the same time." When asked in a live webchat on what was different about this album, he replied, "I believe that there was a sense of not being able to top what we achieved with White Noise, so I was determined we'd create the best songs we've written. We ended up with more songs and at the end of it we went through every tune and picked the best ones that fit together."

Scott Owen has said that for the album they "have taken a lot of inspiration from U2 and INXS, particularly the 'dancey' rock stuff. Rage Against the Machine as well. Something that those three bands share is the ability to get on a groove and stay on it, letting it pulsate and grow in a tribal sort of way, making it quite transfixing without changing the basic formula of each song."

Recording of the album, with Nick DiDia, who came out from Atlanta to produce the album, was completed in May 2011 after which it was sent to Brendan O'Brien for mixing.

== Music and lyrics ==
Chris Cheney has said that for the album, the "aim has been to construct something more direct, simple and therefore tougher and bigger sounding than anything we've done before." He also said that the band "spent a lot of time experimenting with the parts of the songs to achieve this. Also and most importantly this will be an album, not just a bunch of songs."

The album's producer, Nick DiDia, suggested to the band that keeping the songs slower would increase their impact. "He taught us that in slowing the tempo down it makes the song have so much more impact and be so much more direct", said Cheney. "There was an openness and air surrounding the tunes that we didn't want to clutter up playing it too fast or trying to be too fancy with our parts."

Musically, Cheney has said that he used various effects to get a broader sound; "I have used more effects on this record vs others. There was the chorus peddle [sic] which gave songs an '80s flavour we were excited about. The good thing about a new guitar peddle [sic] is when it influences your writing. it's important for our songs to grow and sonically there's a broader spectrum now."

Cheney said that the album title "doesn’t mean anything, but it certainly suggests a theme. Everything must rejuvenate, everything goes in cycles, and we are all going through the same thing, really. It doesn't make exact sense, which is why I kind of like it"

For the first time, with the new album to promote, the band has hired a second guitarist to play live with them. When asked about this, Cheney said, "the songs on the new album aren't more complex but we felt there were some sounds and elements missing from our live show that are on our records. We plan to use him for some of the songs but not all, the idea is that it creates a fuller sound and you will hear parts of our record that have not been executed on stage. It will free me up to play some parts that have been missing from our gigs."

== Release and reception ==
Professional ratings
Review scores
Source	Rating
AllMusic	3/5 stars
Rolling Stone	4.5/5 stars

The title track and lead single was premiered on Triple J Breakfast on 3 June 2011. The single was then made available to stream on the band's official website. "Machine Gun" was also made available to download via the band's Facebook page. The whole album was made available to stream to members of the band's mailing list for 24 hours on 18 July 2011.

The album debuted at number three on the ARIA Album Chart. It received four and a half stars from Rolling Stone, saying it would "be fitting if this became the Living End's defining record". The album was Radar's record of the week.

However, Doug Wallen of The Vine was not so glowing. Labelling the work a 'buffed clean record deprived of heft and depth', he criticises Cheney's lyrics, stating that they are generic and clichéd. Citing a 'radio gloss' on the songs, he feels that the record lacks 'the boiling blood of the best anti-establishment music'.

The album won Best Rock Album at the 2011 ARIA Awards.

== Track listing ==
All tracks are written by Chris Cheney, except where noted.

No.	Title	Length
1.	"In the Morning"	3:17
2.	"Heatwave"	3:08
3.	"Machine Gun"	3:29
4.	"For Another Day"	3:15
5.	"Song for the Lonely"	3:16
6.	"Ride the Wave Boy"	3:52
7.	"Resist"	4:42
8.	"Away from the City"	3:43
9.	"United"	3:34
10.	"Universe"	3:45
11.	"The Ending Is Just the Beginning Repeating" (Cheney/Craig Finn)	4:08

iTunes edition
No.	Title	Length
12.	"Do You Remember"	3:25

== Singles ==
- "The Ending Is Just the Beginning Repeating"
- "Song for the Lonely"
- "Universe"

== Personnel ==
The Living End

- Chris Cheney – vocals, guitar
- Scott Owen – double bass, backing vocals, keys on "Universe" and "Song for the Lonely"
- Andy Strachan – drums, backing vocals

Additional musicians

- Nick DiDia - keys on "Resist" and "Ride the Wave Boy"
- John F. Strachan - spoken word introduction on "Away From the City"

Production

- Nick DiDia – producer
- Nick DiDia; Jordan Power - engineers
- Brendan O'Brien – mixing
- Kory Aaron; TJ Elias - assistant mixers
- Leon Zervos - mastering
- Andrew Jackson; Paul Pilsnenkis - recording assistants

Artwork

- Kane Hibberd - photography
- Chris Cheney - art direction

== Charts ==
=== Weekly charts ===
Chart (2011)	Peak position
Australian Albums (ARIA)	3
New Zealand Albums (RMNZ)	36

=== Year-end charts ===
Chart (2011)	Rank
Australian Artist Albums Chart	31

== Certifications ==
Region	Certification	Certified units/sales
Australia (ARIA)	Gold	35,000^{^}
^{^} Shipments figures based on certification alone.

== Tour ==
=== The Ending is Just the Beginning Repeating Tour 2011 ===
Date	City	Country	Venue
1 September	Brisbane	Australia	The Tivoli
2 September	Brisbane	Australia	The Tivoli
3 September	Sydney	Australia	Enmore Theatre
4 September	Sydney	Australia	Enmore Theatre
7 September	Canberra	Australia	ANU Bar
8 September	Melbourne	Australia	Palace Theatre
9 September	Melbourne	Australia	Palace Theatre
10 September	Adelaide	Australia	Thebarton Theatre
16 September	Perth	Australia	Metro City
