= I Only Trust Rock n Roll =

Studio album by The Living End
- Released: 26 September 2025
- Studio: Brooklet; Sing Sing
- Length: 36:42
- Label: BMG
- Producer: Kevin Shirley

The Living End chronology
Wunderbar (2018)	I Only Trust Rock n Roll (2025)

Singles from I Only Trust Rock n Roll
- 1. "Alfie" Released: 16 May 2025; 2. "Strange Place" Released: 27 June 2025; 3. "I Only Trust Rock n Roll" Released: 21 July 2025; 4. "Misery" Released: 5 September 2025

I Only Trust Rock n Roll is the ninth studio album by Australian punk rock band The Living End. The album was announced in July 2025 and released on 26 September 2025. The album debuted at number 5 on the ARIA Charts, continuing the run of ARIA top ten albums.

Upon announcement, lead vocalist Chris Cheney said "We did not want to make a big, over-the-top record with a hundred parts. We've made those records. This one had to sound like a slick machine. Trim the fat. Yeah, there are those harmonies and extra guitar bits. But a big part of the writing was knowing what a song didn't need."

== Reception ==
Al Newstead from Double J said "I Only Trust Rock n Roll steps back in time sonically, but the pointed lyrics skewer contemporary concerns."

== Track listing ==
All tracks are written by Chris Cheney.

I Only Trust Rock n Roll track listing
No.	Title	Length
1.	"Alfie"	3:40
2.	"Roller"	3:19
3.	"Strange Place"	2:50
4.	"Private Hell"	3:25
5.	"Rain the Parade"	2:35
6.	"Don't Tell Me"	2:28
7.	"Misery"	3:02
8.	"Public Holiday"	4:15
9.	"Camera"	3:37
10.	"Gypsy Blood"	3:37
11.	"I Only Trust Rock n Roll"	3:49
Total length:		36:42

== Personnel ==
Credits adapted from the album's liner notes.

=== The Living End ===
- Chris Cheney – lead vocals, guitar
- Scott Owen – double bass
- Andy Strachan – drums

=== Additional contributors ===
- Kevin Shirley – production (tracks 1–6), mixing (all tracks)
- Stephen Mowat – production, engineering (7)
- Jackson Somerville – engineering (2–6, 8–11)
- Thomas Keating – engineering (1)
- Don Bartley – mastering
- Kahlia Parker – album design, artwork
- Jacob McCann – photography

== Charts ==
=== Weekly charts ===
Chart (2025)	Peak position
Australian Albums (ARIA)	5

=== Year-end charts ===
Year-end chart performance for I Only Trust Rock n Roll
Chart (2025)	Position
Australian Artist Albums (ARIA)	32
