= Shift (The Living End album) =

Studio album by The Living End
- Released: 13 May 2016
- Recorded: Red Door Sounds, Melbourne
- Genre: Alternative rock
- Length: 39:00
- Label: Dew Process
- Producer: Paul 'Woody' Annison, Chris Cheney

The Living End chronology
| The Ending Is Just the Beginning Repeating (2011) | Shift (2016) | Wunderbar (2018) |

Singles from Shift
- 1. "Monkey" Released: 21 March 2016; 2. "Keep On Running" Released: 21 March 2016

Shift is the seventh studio album by Australian punk rock band The Living End, released in May 2016. It was produced by Paul Annison and recorded at Red Door Sounds in Melbourne, Australia.

== Track listing ==
All tracks are written by Chris Cheney, except where noted.

| No. | Title | Writer(s) | Length |
|---|---|---|---|
| 1. | "One Step" | Chris Cheney; Scott Owen; Andy Strachan | 1:54 |
| 2. | "Monkey" | | 3:39 |
| 3. | "Death" | | 2:49 |
| 4. | "Staring Down the Barrel" | | 3:59 |
| 5. | "Keep On Running" | Chris Cheney; Dylan Berry; Stefan Litrownik; Anton Patzner; Lewis Patzner | 4:09 |
| 6. | "Up the Junction" | | 3:36 |
| 7. | "Wire" | | 3:11 |
| 8. | "With Enemies Like That" | | 4:36 |
| 9. | "Further Away" | | 3:32 |
| 10. | "Coma" | Chris Cheney; Marc Orrell | 4:32 |
| 11. | "Life As We Know It" | | 3:00 |

== Personnel ==
The Living End

- Chris Cheney – vocals, guitar
- Scott Owen – double bass, backing vocals
- Andy Strachan – drums, backing vocals

Additional musicians

- Anton Patzner and Lewis Patzner – strings on 'Keep On Running'

Production

- Paul 'Woody' Annison – production, mixing
- Chris Cheney – production
- Will Bowden – mastering
- Daniel Caswell – engineer

Artwork

- Next Episode – art direction, layout
- Kane Hibberd – photography

== Tour ==
| Date | City | Country | Venue |
|---|---|---|---|
| 10 June 2016 | Brisbane | Australia | The Tivoli |
| 11 June 2016 | Sydney | Australia | Enmore Theatre |
| 16 June 2016 | Perth | Australia | The Astor |
| 23 June 2016 | Melbourne | Australia | Forum Theatre |
| 24 June 2016 | Melbourne | Australia | Forum Theatre |
| 25 June 2016 | Adelaide | Australia | The Gov |
| 26 June 2016 | Adelaide | Australia | The Gov |
| 17 August 2016 | Mesa, AZ | USA | Nile Theater |
| 18 August 2016 | San Diego, CA | USA | House of Blues |
| 19 August 2016 | West Hollywood, CA | USA | The Roxy Theatre |
| 20 August 2016 | Pomona, CA | USA | The Glass House |
| 22 August 2016 | Santa Barba, CA | USA | Velvet Jones |
| 24 August 2016 | San Jose, CA | USA | The Ritz |
| 25 August 2016 | San Francisco, | USA | Slim's |
| 27 August 2016 | Portland, OR | USA | Hawthrone Theatre |
| 28 August 2016 | Seattle, WA | USA | Neumos Crystal Ball Reading Room |

== Charts ==
| Chart (2016) | Peak position |
|---|---|
| Australian Albums (ARIA) | 4 |
