= Wunderbar (The Living End album) =

Studio album by The Living End
- Released: 28 September 2018
- Recorded: January – February 2018
- Studios: Toolhouse, Rotenburg an der Fulda, Germany; Globe, Berlin, Germany; Ruby's Studio, Berlin, Germany
- Length: 37:00
- Labels: BMG; Rise
- Producer: Tobias Kuhn

The Living End chronology
| Shift (2016) | Wunderbar (2018) | I Only Trust Rock n Roll (2025) |

Singles from Wunderbar
- 1. "Don't Lose It" Released: 22 June 2018; 2. "Amsterdam" Released: 24 August 2018; 3. "Otherside" Released: 14 September 2018

Professional ratings
Review scores
| Source | Rating |
|---|---|
| Amnplify | Positive |
| Heavy Magazine | 4/5 stars |
| Music Feeds | Positive |
| The Sydney Morning Herald | Positive |
| Triple M | Positive |

Wunderbar is the eighth studio album by Australian punk rock band The Living End, released on 28 September 2018. It was produced by Tobias Kuhn and is the band's first album recorded in Europe.

== Composition and recording ==
In September 2017, the band decided to write and record a new album quickly to push themselves out of their comfort zone. They booked pre-production and recording sessions for January 2018 in Berlin during winter, giving themselves less than four months to write an entire album of new material. Frontman Chris Cheney said: "We had limited time to write, which we were freaked out by at first. But it turned into a good thing because it meant full steam ahead."

Many of the songs on Wunderbar tackle political issues—"Death of the American Dream" concerns social politics and "Not Like the Other Boys" takes on discrimination.

== Track listing ==
| No. | Title | Length |
|---|---|---|
| 1. | "Don't Lose It" | 2:43 |
| 2. | "Not Like the Other Boys" | 3:39 |
| 3. | "Otherside" | 2:52 |
| 4. | "Death of the American Dream" | 3:41 |
| 5. | "Drop the Needle" | 3:20 |
| 6. | "Love Won't Wait" | 3:50 |
| 7. | "Proton Pill" | 2:44 |
| 8. | "Amsterdam" | 3:39 |
| 9. | "Too Young to Die" | 3:06 |
| 10. | "Wake Up the Vampires" | 3:56 |
| 11. | "Rat in a Trap" | 2:58 |
| Total length: | | 37:00 |

Limited edition bonus DVD "The Making of Wunderbar" and "A Full Live Show Recorded in Berlin"
| No. | Title | Length |
|---|---|---|
| 0. | "The Making of Wunderbar" | 20:57 |
| 1. | "Roll On" | 2:45 |
| 2. | "Second Solution" | 4:08 |
| 3. | "Raise the Alarm" | 3:36 |
| 4. | "Staring Down the Barrel" | 4:30 |
| 5. | "Drop the Needle" | 3:19 |
| 6. | "Hold Up" | 4:15 |
| 7. | "Love Won't Wait" | 3:37 |
| 8. | "Who's Gonna Save Us?" | 3:55 |
| 9. | "Prisoner of Society" | 4:30 |
| 10. | "Otherside" | 3:35 |
| 11. | "E-Boogie" | 6:27 |
| 12. | "West End Riot" | 6:55 |

== Personnel ==
=== Band ===
- Chris Cheney – vocals, guitar
- Scott Owen – double bass, backing vocals
- Andy Strachan – drums, backing vocals

=== Additional musicians ===
- Die Toten Hosen – backing vocals

=== Production ===
- Tobias Kuhn – producer
- Jonas Holle – assistant engineer
- Moritz Enders – mixing at Tritonus Studio, Berlin
- Fabricus Clavée – mix assistant
- Kai Blankenberg - mastering at Skyline Tonfabrik, Düsseldorf

=== Artwork ===
- Alan Ashcraft – art direction, layout
- Tracy Gilbert – photography

== Charts ==
| Chart (2018) | Peak position |
|---|---|
| Australian Albums (ARIA) | 3 |
