= Tobias Kuhn =

German songwriter, producer and film composer living in Berlin

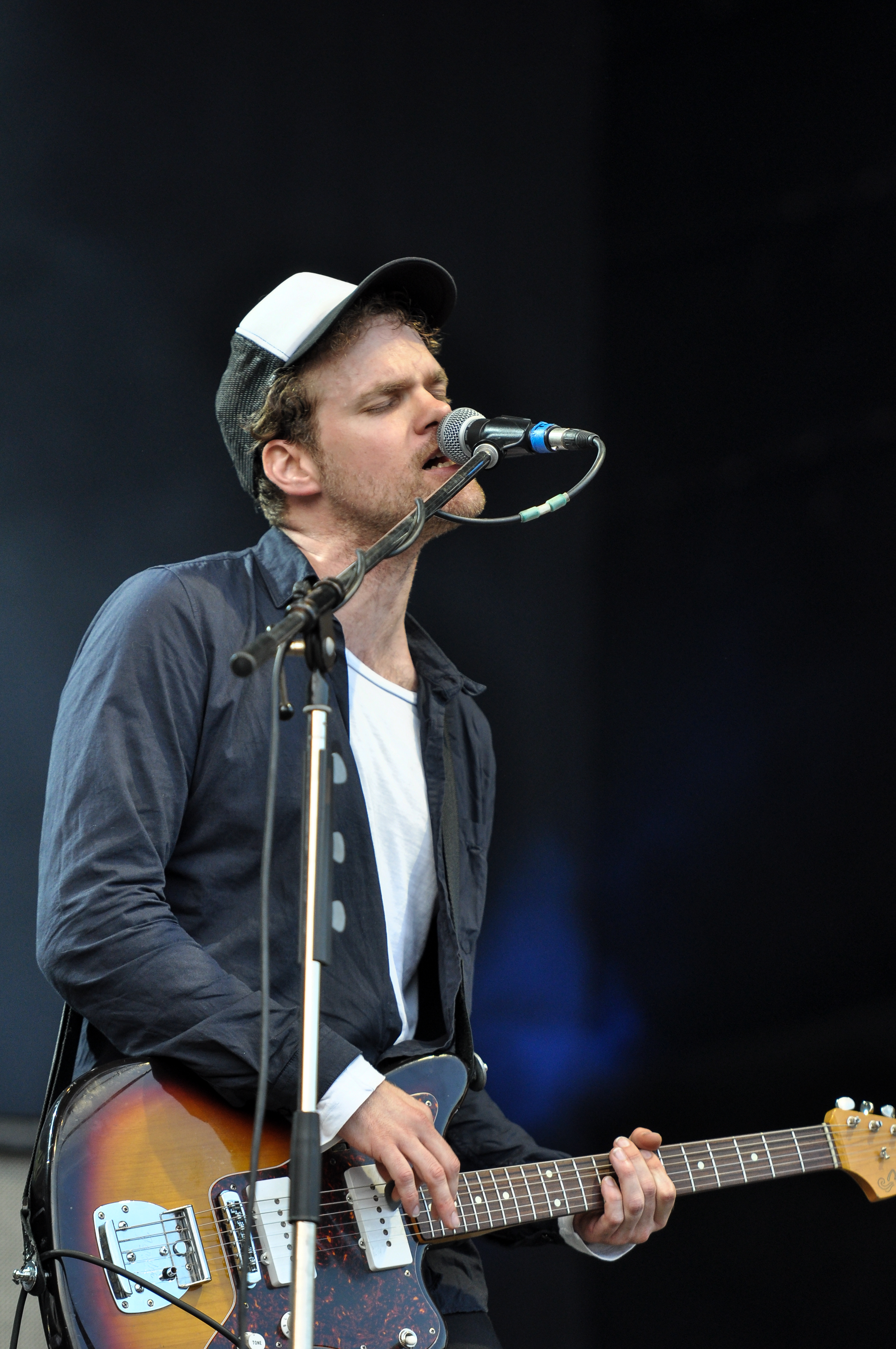
- Tobias Kuhn with Thees Uhlmann, 2013

Background information
- Origin: Germany
- Genres: Indie, Alternative, Pop
- Occupations: Songwriter, Producer, Film Composer
- Years active: 1992–present
- Website: tobiaskuhn.com

Tobias Kuhn is a German songwriter, producer and film composer living in Berlin.

== Career ==
In 1992, Kuhn co-founded German indie band Miles with his high school friends and signed to V2 Records shortly after. After releasing four albums, he started his solo-project Monta and released two critically acclaimed albums including Where Circles Begin which was named "Album of the Week" by the Sunday Times. The song "My Impropriety" was featured on the soundtrack of Palermo Shooting which was directed by Wim Wenders.

Kuhn started writing and producing for other artists afterwards. While having great success with German-language artists such as Die Toten Hosen, for whom he co-produced two Platinum-selling albums, and singer Mark Forster, with whom he wrote the Platinum-awarded single "Choere", Kuhn started working with international artists as well.

In 2017, he co-produced the album Blossom by Milky Chance that entered the Top 10 album charts in countries such as Australia, Canada and Germany. The same year, he also co-wrote the single "Here with You" for Belgian DJs Netsky and Lost Frequencies that peaked on the Belgian Singles charts at number 2, the single "Living in the City" with singer-songwriter Rhys Lewis as well as Who We Are together with Welshly Arms.

In 2018, Kuhn produced the album Wunderbar of Australian rock band The Living End, which peaked on the Australian ARIA charts on number 3. Later the same year, he also produced the album Sturm & Dreck for German band Feine Sahne Fischfilet which peaked on the German album charts at number 3.

In 2018, Alec Benjamin released "1994" as a single, a song he co-wrote with Kuhn. In 2019, the song "Trouble In Paradise" was released on the album Mint by Alice Merton, written by Kuhn and Merton. The album reached number 2 on the German album charts.

In 2019, Tobias Kuhn co-wrote and co-produced the Milky Chance album Mind the Moon in their hometown Kassel, Berlin, Norway, Italy and Australia. After Blossom, this was their second album collaboration. The album featured many internationally renowned artists like Australian star Tash Sultana ("Daydreaming") and Jack Johnson ("Don't let me down"). Furthermore, they wrote and released tracks with South African Choir Ladysmith Black Mamabazo ("Eden's House"). Don't let me down reached #1 of the American triple AAA radio charts.

Kuhn also co-wrote and produced the successful American Alternative Billboard Top 10 Single "Die Happy" with the LA band Dreamers for Hollywood Records.

In September 2019, the Movie "Der hatte Kern" from German Crime Movie Series 'Tatort' premiered on ARD, German television. Kuhn wrote the score for this movie with Markus Perner.

Furthermore, he co-wrote and produced Australian artist Greta Stanley's "Soak into this" and "New feeling" and Noah Kahan's "Close behind" (Republic Records) in 2020.

In June 2020, Kuhn produced the album ("Kitsch") for German artist Annett Louisan in 15 days. It charted at #7 in August 2020 and was released on RCA.

He also co-wrote and produced two tracks for Australian artist Kate Miller Heidke for their forthcoming album which was set for release in autumn 2020. Another release in 2020 was the single "Coast to Coast" by Norwegian singer Dagny.

In 2021, he co-produced and co-wrote "Till I found You" with South African artist Jeremy Loops (Decca) and 'First day of my life' by the Belgian Singer-Songwriter Milow.

In between 2020 and 2022, Kuhn produced and co-wrote the album '10 Tracks to Echo in the Dark' by the English band The Kooks in London Berlin and Vienna. He also produced the album 'Jeder nur ein Kreuz' by the Munich band Sportfreunde Stiller in Vienna and Italy.

In the same year, he co-wrote the song 'Live Without It' with English artist Dylan, '27000 Steps' with English artist Casey Lowry, Alice Merton's 'Blindside' and the Milky Chance single 'Troubled Man'. Besides that, he also wrote the music for the Amazon Prime series 'Love Addicts' which was to be released at the end of 2022.

At the moment he is working on his own Monta Album.

== Awards and nominations ==
=== APRA Awards ===
The APRA Awards are presented annually from 1982 by the Australasian Performing Right Association (APRA).

Year	Nominee / work	Award	Result
2019	"Don't Lose It" - Chris Cheney, Scott Owen, Andy Strachan, Tobias Kuhn	Song of the Year	Shortlisted
2020	"Otherside" - Chris Cheney, Scott Owen, Andy Strachan, Tobias Kuhn	Most Performed Rock Work of the Year	Nominated
