= The Ending Is Just the Beginning Repeating (song) =

Single by The Living End

from the album The Ending Is Just the Beginning Repeating
- Released: 3 June 2011
- Recorded: 2011
- Genre: Rock
- Length: 4:08
- Label: Dew Process
- Songwriter(s): Chris Cheney
- Producer(s): Nick DiDia

The Living End singles chronology
"Raise the Alarm" (2009)	"The Ending Is Just the Beginning Repeating" (2011)	"Song for the Lonely" (2011)

"The Ending Is Just the Beginning Repeating" is a song by Australian rock band The Living End. It is the lead single and title track from their sixth studio album. The song was released through iTunes Store on 3 June 2011.

== Track listing ==
All tracks written by Chris Cheney.

1. "The Ending Is Just the Beginning Repeating" – 4:08
