= The Living End (The Living End album) =

Studio album by the Living End
- Released: 12 October 1998
- Recorded: 1997–1998
- Studio: Sing Sing Studios, Melbourne
- Genre: Punk rock, psychobilly
- Length: 47:05
- Label: Modular, EMI
- Producer: Lindsay Gravina

The Living End chronology
| The Living End (1998) | Roll On (2000) |

Singles from The Living End
- 1. "Second Solution / Prisoner of Society" Released: 8 September 1997; 2. "Prisoner of Society" Released: 4 January 1998; 3. "Save the Day" Released: 13 September 1998; 4. "All Torn Down" Released: December 1998; 5. "West End Riot" Released: July 1999; 6. "Trapped" Released: 14 September 1999 (US release only)

The Living End is the debut album of the Australian punk rock band the Living End, released on 12 October 1998. It was recorded at Sing Sing Studios in Melbourne, with Lindsay Gravina producing for Modular Recordings. The cover art, as described by front man Chris Cheney, is based on a photograph of a World War I all-female bomb factory. The album reached No. 1 on the ARIA Albums Chart and remained in the top 50 for 63 weeks.

The band had achieved mainstream success with their EP, Second Solution / Prisoner of Society, released in September 1997. It peaked at No. 4 on the ARIA Singles Chart. In early 1998, the related single "Prisoner of Society" was released in the United Kingdom and, the following year, in the United States. Other charting Australian singles were "Save the Day" and "All Torn Down". The sixth album track, "Monday", is the Living End's epitaph to the 1996 Dunblane massacre.

In December 1999 the album was certified 4× platinum by Australian Recording Industry Association (ARIA) for shipment of 280,000 units. In October 2010 it was listed in the book, 100 Best Australian Albums. As of July 2012, it is the band's most successful album.

== Background ==
The Living End is the first full-length album by the Australian punk/rockabilly band the Living End, which was issued on 12 October 1998. The group had formed in 1994 in Melbourne by Chris Cheney on guitar and lead vocals, and Scott Owen on double bass and backing vocals. In 1996 they were joined by Travis Demsey on drums. In September 1997 they released their third extended play, Second Solution / Prisoner of Society, which peaked at No. 4 on the ARIA Singles Chart. Early in 1998 "Prisoner of Society" was issued as a separate single in the United Kingdom and, the following year, in the United States. It peaked at No. 23 on the Billboard Alternative Songs Chart.

Their next Australian single, "Save the Day" was issued in September 1998, a month ahead of the album. It made the top 30 on the ARIA Singles Chart. The album reached No. 1 on the related ARIA Albums Chart and remained in the top 50 for 63 weeks. Their third Australian single from the album, "All Torn Down" appeared in December 1998 and peaked at No. 12. In July 1999 a fourth single, "West End Riot" was issued, which did not reach the top 50 – although it was popular with listeners of national radio station, Triple J, appearing on their Hottest 100 poll for that year. The sixth album track, "Monday", is the Living End's epitaph to the 1996 Dunblane massacre. The band supported The Offspring on the latter's Americana Tour during 1999. During 1999 they issued a US-only single, "Trapped", which did not chart.

In December 1999 The Living End was certified 4× Platinum by Australian Recording Industry Association (ARIA) for shipment of 280,000 units. In October 2010 it was listed in the book, 100 Best Australian Albums. As of July 2012 it is the band's most commercially successful album.

== Reception ==
Professional ratings
Review scores
| Source | Rating |
|---|---|
| Allmusic | 4/5 stars |
| Christgau's Consumer Guide | (dud) |
| Rolling Stone | 3.5/5 stars |

Allmusic's reviewer, Stephen Thomas Erlewine, felt "they've cleverly appropriated certain rockabilly signatures – most ridiculously, the upright acoustic bass – that give their homage to the golden age of punk a bit of charm. That would be enough to elevate them above many of their contemporaries, but they happen to rock harder and write better songs than many late-'90s punkers". The album peaked at No.33 on the Billboard Heatseekers Chart. While Rolling Stone's Noah Tarnow found the group "revives the juvie mentality of several generations of guitar slingers, blending rockabilly's greasy-haired swagger with pissed-punk vitriol". The authors of 100 Best Australian Albums remembered "[t]his was a record that boomed out of bedrooms across the country and turned the front of stage at summer festivals into pure bedlam... [the album] was made quickly, but with assuredness; the trio ... knew what they wanted".

== Track listing ==
All songs written by Chris Cheney, except for where noted.

Australian version
| No. | Title | Length |
|---|---|---|
| 1. | "Prisoner of Society" | 3:52 |
| 2. | "Growing Up (Falling Down)" | 3:56 |
| 3. | "Second Solution" | 3:00 |
| 4. | "West End Riot" | 3:54 |
| 5. | "Bloody Mary" | 3:45 |
| 6. | "Monday" | 3:32 |
| 7. | "All Torn Down" | 4:09 |
| 8. | "Save the Day" | 2:56 |
| 9. | "Trapped" | 3:26 |
| 10. | "Have They Forgotten" | 3:13 |
| 11. | "Fly Away" | 2:53 |
| 12. | "I Want a Day" (Cheney, Scott Owen) | 2:29 |
| 13. | "Sleep on It" | 2:58 |
| 14. | "Closing In" | 3:03 |
| Total length: | | 47:05 |

Bonus track (Japanese edition)
| No. | Title | Length |
|---|---|---|
| 15. | "Mr Businessman" |

Note: "Sleep on It" was omitted and changed to "Strange" for all versions released outside Australia. "Strange" had already appeared on previous releases in Australia and it was deemed unnecessary to repeat the track again for Australian fans.

== Singles ==
- "Save the Day" (1998)
- "Prisoner of Society" (1998) – (also featured in the video game Guitar Hero World Tour)
- "All Torn Down" (1999)
- "Trapped" (1999)
- "West End Riot" (1999)
- "Second Solution" (1998)
- "Tainted Love" (1998) – (Live; Gloria Jones cover)

== Charts ==
=== Weekly charts ===
| Chart (1998–2000) | Peak position |
|---|---|
| Australian Albums (ARIA) | 1 |
| New Zealand Albums (RMNZ) | 27 |

=== Year-end charts ===
| Chart (1998) | Rank |
|---|---|
| Australian Albums Chart | 29 |
| Australian Artist Albums Chart | 6 |
| Chart (1999) | Rank |
| Australian Albums Chart | 13 |
| Australian Artist Albums Chart | 3 |

== Certifications ==
| Region | Certification | Certified units/sales |
|---|---|---|
| Australia (ARIA) | 4× Platinum | 280,000^{^} |
^{^} Shipments figures based on certification alone.

== Personnel ==
The Living End members

- Chris Cheney – vocals, guitar
- Travis Demsey – drums, backing vocals
- Scott Owen – double bass, backing vocals

Additional musicians

- Alistair Shepherd (from Area-7) – saxophone on "Trapped"
- Toby Dargaville (from Area-7) – trumpet on "Trapped"

Recording process

- Producer – Lindsay Gravina
- Engineer – Lindsay Gravina
  - Assistant engineer – Matt Voight
- Mastering – Stephen Marcussen at Precision Mastering
- Mixing – Jerry Finn
  - Assistant mixer – Mark and Tony
- Editing (digital) – Don C. Tyler
- Studios – Sing Sing Studios, Melbourne
  - Mixing studios – Conway Studios, Los Angeles

Art works

- Cover art – Craig Preston
- Photography – Melanie Nissen, Rae Harvey, Craig Preston, Darren Hawthorne, Emma Hameister, Michelle Harrison, Sam Kensley
