= Roll On (The Living End album) =

Studio album by the Living End
- Released: 27 November 2000
- Recorded: July 2000
- Studio: Sing Sing Studios, Melbourne
- Length: 47:57
- Label: EMI
- Producer: Nick Launay

The Living End chronology
The Living End (1998)	Roll On (2000)	Modern Artillery (2003)

Professional ratings
Review scores
Source	Rating
AllMusic	3/5 stars
Rolling Stone	4/5 stars
Robert Christgau	C

Roll On is the second studio album by Australian punk rock band the Living End. It was released in Australia and New Zealand in November 2000, and internationally in March 2001.

The album was the band's last major work to feature drummer Travis Demsey. In the downtime following the album's release and subsequent tour, he would leave the band, to be replaced by Andy Strachan.

ARIA publicised that Roll On had officially achieved 2× platinum status in Australia in November 2007.

== Background ==
Musically, the album marked a change from the sound of their debut album, The Living End. Roll On had a notably more polished sound (as compared to the rawer sound of the previous album). Horn sections featured on numerous songs, such as "Uncle Harry" and "Killing The Right". Whereas the previous album had displayed punk and rockabilly influences (by artists such as Green Day and Stray Cats), Roll On showed more Australian rock influences, particularly artists of the 80s Pub Rock era. The album even garnered comparison, by a few critics, to seminal punk band The Clash's creative breakthrough, London Calling. The album was recorded with producer Nick Launay, who had previously worked with artists such as Silverchair and Midnight Oil.

== Track listing ==
All tracks are written by Chris Cheney.

Roll On track listing
No.	Title	Length
1.	"Roll On"	3:09
2.	"Pictures in the Mirror"	3:18
3.	"Riot on Broadway"	2:56
4.	"Staring at the Light"	4:08
5.	"Carry Me Home"	3:12
6.	"Don't Shut the Gate"	3:04
7.	"Dirty Man"	3:36
8.	"Blood on Your Hands"	4:14
9.	"Revolution Regained"	2:46
10.	"Silent Victory"	3:35
11.	"Read About It"	3:16
12.	"Killing the Right"	4:21
13.	"Astoria Paranoia"	3:05
14.	"Uncle Harry"	3:24
Total length:		47:57

Bonus track (US edition)
No.	Title	Length
15.	"Prisoner of Society" (live)	4:37

== Singles ==
- "Pictures in the Mirror", 2000 single – #18 Australia, Triple J Hottest 100, 2000 #19
- "Roll On", 2000 single – #15 Australia, Triple J Hottest 100, 2001 #72
- "Dirty Man", 2001 single
- "Carry Me Home", 2001 radio promo

== Personnel ==
The Living End

- Chris Cheney – vocals, guitar
- Scott Owen – double bass, backing vocals
- Travis Demsey – drums

Additional musicians

- Jack Howard – trumpet
- Aidan McArtney – trombone
- Jeremy Smith – French horn
- Butch Lee – percussion
- Cameron Baines (from Bodyjar) – backing vocals
- Grant Relf (from Bodyjar) – backing vocals
- Tom Read (from Bodyjar) – backing vocals
- Jon Toogood (from Shihad) – backing vocals
- Tom Larkin (from Shihad) – backing vocals
- Gabriel Atkinson (from Weta) - backing vocals

Production

- Nick Launay – record producer
- Andy Wallace – mixer

== Charts ==
=== Weekly charts ===
Weekly chart performance for Roll On
Chart (2000–2001)	Peak position
Australian Albums (ARIA)	8
New Zealand Albums (RMNZ)	34

=== Year-end charts ===
Year-end chart performance for Roll On
Chart (2000)	Rank
Australian Albums Chart	61
Australian Artist Albums Chart	19

== Certifications ==
Certifications for Roll On
Region	Certification	Certified units/sales
Australia (ARIA)	2× Platinum	140,000^{^}
^{^} Shipments figures based on certification alone.
