= All Torn Down =

Single by The Living End

from the album The Living End
- Released: December 1998
- Recorded: 1998
- Genre: Punk rock, punkabilly
- Length: 4:07
- Label: Modular, EMI
- Songwriter(s): Chris Cheney, Travis Demsey
- Producer(s): Lindsay Gravina

The Living End singles chronology
"Save the Day" (1998)	"All Torn Down" (1998)	"West End Riot" (1999)

"All Torn Down" is a song by Australian punk rock band The Living End. It was released in December 1998, as the third single from their self-titled album. It spent 18 weeks in the Australian ARIA Singles Chart and peaked at No. 12.

The song has a fast tempo of 133 beats per minute.

== Background ==
The song title and lyrics refer to the rapid development of Melbourne in the late 1990s, with major projects such as CityLink and Melbourne Docklands in progress and being constructed with little regard to whether it was development on parks or historic sites. The cover art depicts a redscale Melway map of the Melbourne CBD and Southbank area..

I was still living at home in Wheeler’s Hill when that came out. I’d see a bunch of beautiful old buildings disappearing in the city… and when they’re done they’re gone. It was about me being into old-fashioned cars, music and fashion; why can’t things just stay the way they are?

— Chris Cheney, 2012

== Track listing ==
No.	Title	Writer(s)	Length
1.	"All Torn Down"	Chris Cheney, Travis Demsey	4:07
2.	"Witch Doctor"	Chris Cheney, Scott Owen	2:44
3.	"Tainted Love"	Ed Cobb	3:43
4.	"Second Solution" (live video)	Chris Cheney, Scott Owen	3:26
5.	"The Living End" (live video)	Chris Cheney	2:59

== Charts ==
Chart (1998)	Peak Position
Australian ARIA Singles Chart	12
Triple J Hottest 100	41

=== Year-end charts ===
Country	Chart	Ranking
Australia	ARIA Singles	91

== Certifications ==
Territory	Provider	Certification
Australia	ARIA	Gold

== Release history ==
Region	Date	Label	Format	Catalogue
Australia	December 1998	Modular Recordings	CD	MODCS002
Australia	December 1998	EMI	CD	7243 8 86458 0 5

== Personnel ==
Band members

- Chris Cheney – vocals, guitar
- Travis Demsey – drums, backing vocals
- Scott Owen – double bass, backing vocals

Recording process

- Producer – Lindsay Gravina ("All Torn Down" & "Witch Doctor")
- Engineer – Lindsay Gravina ("All Torn Down" & "Witch Doctor")
  - Assistant engineer – Matt Voight ("All Torn Down" & "Witch Doctor")
- Mastering – Stephen Marcussen at Precision Mastering
- Mixing – Jerry Finn ("All Torn Down" & "Witch Doctor")
  - Assistant mixer – Mark and Tony ("All Torn Down" & "Witch Doctor")
- Editing (digital) – Don C. Tyler
- Studios – Sing Sing Studios, Melbourne ("All Torn Down" & "Witch Doctor"); Q Recordings ("Tainted Love")
  - Mixing studios – Conway Studios, Los Angeles

Art works

- Cover art – Craig Preston
