= Hellbound (EP) =

EP by The Living End
- Released: 1995
- Recorded: 1994–1995
- Genres: Punk rock, punkabilly
- Length: 27:39
- Label: Shock
- Producer: The Living End

The Living End chronology
Hellbound (1995)	It's for Your Own Good (1996)

Hellbound is the debut EP by Australian punk rock band the Living End, released in 1995. It was recorded in 1995 at Whirled Records, Richmond, Victoria, except for the song Headlines which was recorded at Toybox Studios in 1994.

In 2005, the EP was re-released and remastered as part of a double CD pack in 2005 (with It's for Your Own Good). The artwork for both albums was altered for this release.

== Track listing ==
No.	Title	Writer(s)	Length
1.	"Trace of Doubt"	Chris Cheney	3:56
2.	"Hellbound"	Cheney	4:45
3.	"Tabletop Show"	Cheney	3:03
4.	"The Living End"	Cheney	2:53
5.	"Strange"	Cheney	4:22
6.	"Headlines"	Cheney, Scott Owen	3:08
7.	"Misspent Youth"	Cheney	2:51
8.	"So Lonely"	Cheney, Owen	2:39
9.	"Do What I Do" (early releases only)
Total length:			27:39

== Notes ==
- Some editions of the release feature the title "The" and "End" in blue, rather than white. The original art has a white square on the right of Chris Cheney's head. This has been removed on later releases.
- Hellbound was first released via Shock Records, later re-released through MDS and again via EMI.
- The very first editions of Hellbound feature a ninth bonus track, "Do What I Do". This song was taken off the CD for later pressings.

== Personnel ==
- Chris Cheney - guitars and vocals
- Scott Owen - double bass and backing vocals
- Joe Piripitzi - drums and backing vocals
