= Save the Day (The Living End song) =

Single by The Living End

from the album The Living End
- B-side: "Lone Ranger" "Mr Businessman"
- Released: 21 September 1998
- Recorded: 1998
- Studio: Sing Sing Studios, Melbourne
- Genre: Punk rock, punkabilly
- Length: 2:55
- Label: Modular, EMI
- Songwriter(s): Chris Cheney, Travis Demsey
- Producer(s): Lindsay Gravina

The Living End singles chronology
"Second Solution/Prisoner of Society" (1997)	"Save the Day" (1998)	"All Torn Down" (1998)

"Save the Day" is a song by Australian punk rock band The Living End, released in September 1998. It is the first official single taken from the band's self-titled album, following the release of the Second Solution / Prisoner of Society EP the previous year. The song spent 17 weeks in the Australian ARIA Singles Chart, peaking at No. 22, and reached No. 10 on Triple J's Hottest 100 for 1998. The single was later certified gold, selling in excess of 35,000 copies.

The single was also released on 7" vinyl, however it was a limited release with only 500 copies issued.

== Track listing ==
No.	Title	Writer(s)	Length
1.	"Save the Day"	Chris Chenney, Scott Owen, Travis Demsey	2:55
2.	"Lone Ranger"	Chris Chenney, Scott Owen, Travis Demsey	2:50
3.	"Mr Business Man"	Chris Chenney, Scott Owen, Travis Demsey	3:19

== Charts ==
Chart (1998)	Peak position
Australian ARIA Singles Chart	22
Triple J Hottest 100	10

== Certifications ==
Territory	Provider	Certification
Australia	ARIA	Gold

== Release history ==
Region	Date	Label	Format	Catalogue
Australia	September 1998	Modular Recordings	CD	MODCS001
Australia	September 1998	Modular Recordings	7" vinyl single	MODVL001

== Personnel ==
The Living End

- Chris Cheney – vocals, guitar
- Travis Demsey – drums, backing vocals
- Scott Owen – double bass, backing vocals

Recording process

- Producer – Lindsay Gravina
- Engineer – Lindsay Gravina
  - Assistant engineer – Matt Voight
- Mastering – Gavin Lurssen
- Mixing – Jerry Finn
- Editing (digital) – Don C. Tyler
- Studios – Sing Sing Studios, Melbourne
  - Mixing studios – Conway Studios, Los Angeles

Art works

- Cover art – Craig Preston
- Photography - Melanie Nissen
