= Pictures in the Mirror =

2000 single by The Living End

Single by The Living End

from the album Roll On
- Released: 16 October 2000
- Recorded: 2000
- Genre: Punk rock
- Length: 3:20
- Label: EMI
- Songwriter: Chris Cheney
- Producer: Nick Launay

The Living End singles chronology
"West End Riot" (1999)	"Pictures in the Mirror" (2000)	"Roll On" (2001)

"Pictures in the Mirror" is a song by Australian punk rock band The Living End. It was released on 16 October 2000, as the first single from their second album, Roll On. It reached number 18 on the ARIA Singles Chart.

== Track listing ==
No.	Title	Length
1.	"Pictures in the Mirror"	3:20
2.	"Uncle Harry"	3:17
3.	"There Is No Radio" (Demo)	3:11
4.	"The Man With No Name" (Demo)	3:54
