= Roll On (The Living End song) =

2001 single by the Living End

Single by the Living End

from the album Roll On
- B-side: "Pictures in the Mirror" (live); "Sunday Bloody Sunday"; "I've Just Seen a Face"; "Homestead" (demo)
- Released: 22 January 2001
- Length: 3:08
- Label: EMI
- Songwriter: Chris Cheney
- Producer: Nick Launay

The Living End singles chronology
"Pictures in the Mirror" (2000)	"Roll On" (2001)	"Dirty Man" (2001)

"Roll On" is a song by Australian punk rock band the Living End. It was released on 22 January 2001 as the second single from the band's second studio album, Roll On. The track's title is based on the 1998 Australian waterfront dispute. Chris Cheney stated, "It's a stomping song for the underdog. Kind of a hope song, about getting past your obstacles and living to tell the tale."

"Roll On" reached number 15 on the Australian ARIA Singles Chart, number two on the ARIA Alternative chart, and number 33 on the US Billboard Modern Rock Tracks chart. The music video for the song was directed by Mark Hartley. The song was described by PopMatters as "an anthem destined to shake the trio of its rockabilly notions forever."

== Track listing ==
1. "Roll On"
2. "Pictures in the Mirror" (live)
3. "Sunday Bloody Sunday" (U2 cover)
4. "I've Just Seen a Face" (The Beatles cover)
5. "Homestead" (demo)

== Charts ==
Chart (2001)	Peak position
Australia (ARIA)	15
Australia Alternative (ARIA)	2
US Modern Rock Tracks (Billboard)	33

== Release history ==
Region	Date	Format(s)	Label(s)	Ref.
Australia	22 January 2001	CD	EMI	
United States	27 February 2001	Mainstream rock; active rock; alternative radio	Reprise	
