= Second Solution / Prisoner of Society =

EP by The Living End
- Released: 15 September 1997
- Recorded: 1997
- Genre: Punk rock
- Length: 16:29
- Label: Rapido
- Producer: Lindsay Gravina

The Living End chronology
It's for Your Own Good (1996)	Second Solution / Prisoner of Society (1997)	The Living End (1998)

Music videos
- "Second Solution" on YouTube
- "Prisoner of Society" on YouTube

"Second Solution" / "Prisoner of Society" is the third EP by Australian rock band The Living End. It was the best selling Australian single of the 1990s, and spent a record-breaking 69 weeks on the ARIA Top 100 singles chart. It provided a breakthrough for the band, bringing them to the attention of the Australian rock scene. Boosted by the success of this EP, they subsequently went into the studio to record their debut full-length album, The Living End, on which they re-recorded both of the title songs.

== Music videos ==
=== Prisoner of Society ===
The music clip for "Prisoner of Society" was released first and features the band simply playing the song in a schoolroom intercut with scenes of young people in the same classroom who are rebelliously presenting "essays" to the class (though the essays they're reading are the lyrics of the song).This version of song is favoured by most fans along with the film clip being shot on a budget of $2000.

=== Second Solution ===
Following the release of the video for "Prisoner of Society", the band filmed and released the follow-up with "Second Solution." This video uses live clips from old performances where they play the song and shows all three members play their respective instruments in tune to the song at the same time.

== Track listing ==
All songs were written by Chris Cheney.

1. "Second Solution" – 3:09
2. "Prisoner of Society" – 3:54
3. "Prisoner on the Inside" – 2:28 (Cover of the theme song from Prisoner, originally by Lynne Hamilton)
4. "Misspent Youth" (Live) – 2:52
5. "Strange" (Live) – 4:06

== Personnel ==
- Chris Cheney – guitars and vocals
- Scott Owen – upright bass and backing vocals
- Travis Demsey – drums and backing vocals

== Charts ==
=== Weekly charts ===
Chart (1998)	Peak position
Australia (ARIA)	4
New Zealand (Recorded Music NZ)	28
United Kingdom (Official Charts Company)	179

=== Year-end charts ===
Chart (1998)	Peak position
Australia (ARIA)	6

== Certifications ==
Region	Certification	Certified units/sales
Australia (ARIA)	2× Platinum	140,000^{^}
^{^} Shipments figures based on certification alone.
