= It's for Your Own Good (EP) =

EP by The Living End
- Released: 11 November 1996
- Recorded: June 1996
- Genre: Punk rock, psychobilly
- Length: 21:40
- Label: Rapido
- Producer: Lindsay Gravina, Mike Alonso, The Living End

The Living End chronology
Hellbound (1995)	It's for Your Own Good (1996)	Second Solution / Prisoner of Society (1997)

Singles from It's for Your Own Good
- 1. "From Here on In" Released: 1997

It's for Your Own Good is the second EP by Australian punk rock band The Living End. It was recorded in June 1996 at Birdland Studio, Melbourne. The lead track, "From Here on In", also provided the name for the band's singles compilation, which was released in 2004. The original cover art featured incorrect formatting of the word "It's" as "I'ts". This was rectified on later re-releases. The EP features a cover of The Cure's "10:15 Saturday Night".

== Reception ==
Professional ratings
Review scores
Source	Rating
AllMusic	4.5/5 stars
PunkNews.org	4/5 stars
Sputnikmusic	4.5/5 stars

Jonathan Lewis of AllMusic rated It's for Your Own Good as four-and-a-half stars out of five. He felt that it had "Equal parts punk, ska, rockabilly and straightforward rock" and the group were "able to transfer the energy of their live performances to their studio recordings".

The EP peaked at #99 on the Australian ARIA singles chart in March 1997.

== Track listing ==
No.	Title	Length
1.	"From Here on In"	2:42
2.	"English Army"	2:51
3.	"One More Cell"	3:57
4.	"Stay Away from Me"	4:43
5.	"Problem"	2:33
6.	"10:15 Saturday Night"	4:54

== Charts ==
Chart performance for It's for Your Own Good
Chart (1997)	Peak position
Australia (ARIA)	99
