= From Here on In (video album) =

From Here on In: The DVD 1997–2004

Video by The Living End
- Released: 27 September 2004 (Australia)
- Recorded: 1996–2004
- Genre: Punk rock, rockabilly
- Label: EMI

The Living End chronology
From Here on In: The DVD 1997–2004 (2004)	Live at Festival Hall (2006)

From Here on In: The DVD 1997–2004 is a video compilation album of Australian punk rock band The Living End, released as a double-DVD in 2004. The album features video clips of the band's singles as well as a "supergig". The second disc contains a 2-hour documentary titled "In the End", which outlines the band's history.

== Disc one ==
Music videos:

1. Prisoner of Society (US & Australian versions)
2. Second Solution
3. Save the Day
4. All Torn Down
5. West End Riot
6. Pictures in the Mirror
7. Roll On (US & Australian Versions)
8. Dirty Man
9. One Said to the Other
10. Who's Gonna Save Us? (US & Australian Versions)
11. Tabloid Magazine
12. I Can't Give You What I Haven't Got

"Supergig":

1. Roll On (Summer Sonic)
2. Save the Day (Splendour in the Grass)
3. One Said to the Other (Summer Sonic)
4. Prisoner of Society (Summer Sonic)
5. Blinded (Big Day Out)
6. West End Riot (Splendour in the Grass)
7. Pictures in the Mirror (Summer Sonic)
8. All Torn Down (Big Day Out)
9. Carry Me Home (Splendour in the Grass)
10. What Would You Do? (Big Day Out)
11. E-Boogie (Splendour in the Grass)
12. Second Solution (Summer Sonic)

== Disc two ==
2-hour feature documentary "In the End"

The disc mistakenly lists the title of the documentary as "The End", leaving out the word "In". This caused speculation over a possible break-up of the band at the time of the DVD's release.

== Charts ==
Chart (2004)	Peak position
Australian DVD Chart (ARIA Charts)	3

== Certifications ==
Region	Certification	Certified units/sales
Australia (ARIA)	Platinum	15,000^{^}
^{^} Shipments figures based on certification alone.
