= Chris Cheney =

Australian musician (born 1975)

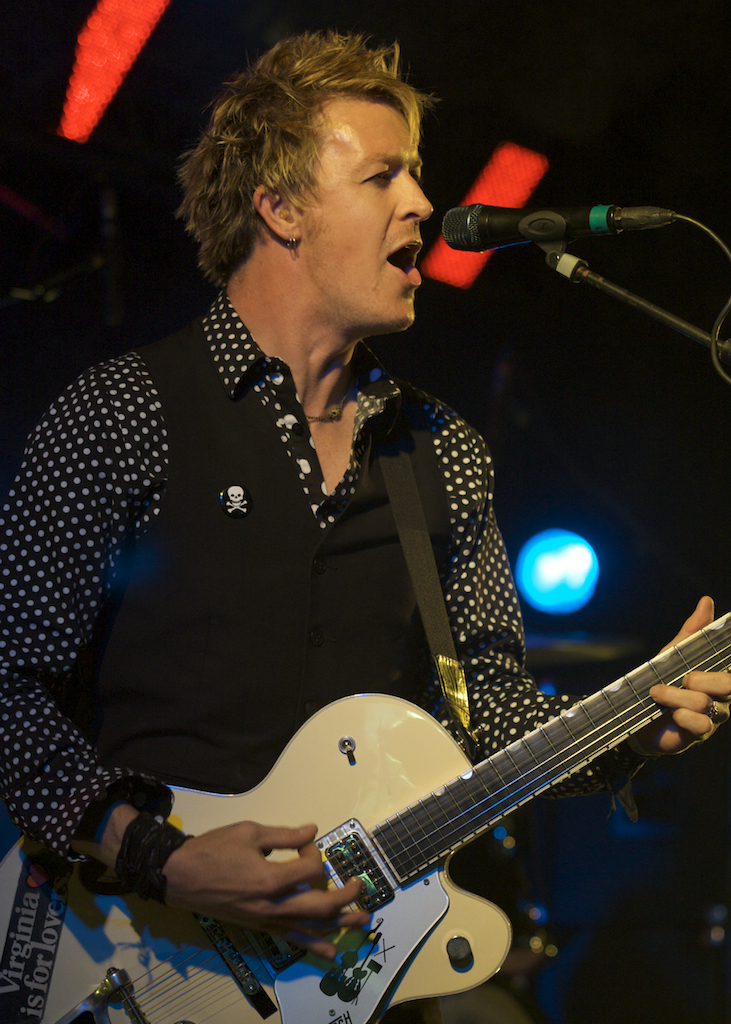
- Performing at Nibe Festival 2009, in Denmark

Background information
- Born: Christopher John Cheney; 2 January 1975 (age 51); Melbourne, Victoria, Australia
- Genres: Rockabilly; punk rock; alternative rock
- Occupations: Musician; songwriter; producer
- Instruments: Vocals; guitar; bass guitar
- Years active: 1992–present
- Labels: Dew Process; Deck Cheese; Adeline; EastWest; EMI; Modular; Rapido; Independent

Christopher John Cheney (born 2 January 1975) is an Australian rock musician, record producer, and studio owner. He is the founding mainstay guitarist, songwriter, and lead vocalist of the rockabilly band The Living End, which was formed in 1994 with schoolmate Scott Owen. Cheney wrote the group's top 20 hits on the ARIA Singles Chart: "Second Solution" / "Prisoner of Society" (1997), "All Torn Down" (1999), "Pictures in the Mirror" (2000), "Roll On" (2001), "One Said to the Other" (2003), "What's on Your Radio" (2005), "Wake Up" (2006), and "White Noise" (2008). In 2004, Cheney joined the supergroup The Wrights which put out a cover version of Stevie Wright's epic 11-minute track, "Evie" as a single. At the 2009 APRA Music Awards, Cheney won Song of the Year for writing The Living End's track, "White Noise".

== Biography ==
=== Personal life ===
Cheney was born on 2 January 1975 and grew up in Wheelers Hill, an outer-eastern suburb of Melbourne. His father is Noel Cheney. At the age of five years, he saw his first rock performance at VFL Park, which was close to his home, it was a gig by the American rock band, Kiss. He attended Jells Park Primary School in between 1981 and 1987 and then Wheelers Hill Secondary College. He later studied Jazz at Box Hill Institute of TAFE between 1994 and 1995. Cheney started playing the guitar at the age of six he taught himself how to play by listening to AC/DC cassette tapes over and over and practising what he heard. His major influence was Brian Setzer (Stray Cats), a guitarist and singer-songwriter.

On 22 September 2001, Cheney was injured in a car crash where his right leg was crushed, which required surgery with a rod and three pins being inserted to stabilize the fracture. He was initially confined to bed and later used a walking stick for the next six months. He was unable to play the guitar until he was rehabilitated. His future wife, Emma, was also inside the vehicle, but escaped with only minor injuries. Cheney eventually married Emma in 2005, they have two daughters: Charlie Bella (born 2006) and Scarlett Lyric (born 2008). In October 2010, Chris and Emma, along with his manager Rae Harvey and her partner Woody Annison, opened their own recording studio, Red Door Sounds. On 25 April 2011, his father, Noel, died having been diagnosed with cancer the previous year. Late that year, the Cheneys moved to live in Los Angeles, California. On their new life in L.A., Cheney remarked: "Both our littlies are in school here ... It's everyday life. You get up, mad rush in the morning, school drop-off, I come home, write a few songs, bum around and it's school pick-up again. It's life as we knew it, just in a different country". In 2020, Cheney and his family relocated back to Melbourne due to the COVID-19 pandemic.

=== Music career ===
Cheney met Scott Owen at Jells Park Primary School and they began their career together in 1992, in a Melbourne band, The Runaway Boys, who took their name from a Stray Cats album, Runaway Boys – which Cheney cites as one of his favourites. The group was a covers band playing Stray Cats and The Clash material. In 1992, the group's first paying gig was at the Richmond Club Hotel and they soon followed with a residency at the nearby Corner Hotel. The Runaway Boys had a succession of drummers, "The first two guys, Shane and Grant, were at high school with us and they were never really into 1950s rock'n'roll. We were probably a bit pushy at that point. Grant was happy to play along, but then when high school finished he was ready to move on and go to university". Cheney also gigged on guitar in another band, Goodbye Sideburns Forever, though he was not recorded with them.

==== The Living End ====
Cheney and Owen, on piano and bass, were in The Runaway Boys. In 1994, the pair started to write their own material and were joined by Joe Piripitzi on drums to form The Living End. They released two successive extended plays, Hellbound (1995) and It's for Your Own Good (November 1996), which contained their first radio single, "From Here on In". The track is co-written by Cheney and Owen. In 1996 while Green Day were touring Australia, The Living End sent their second EP to the band, and supported them on their tour, which then led to radio station, Triple J, playing their first single. Late that year Piripitzi was replaced on drums by Travis Demsey. In September 1997 The Living End issued a third EP, Second Solution / Prisoner of Society, with four of its five tracks written by Cheney. The EP peaked at No. 4 on the ARIA Singles Chart. It became the highest-selling Australian-made single for the 1990s.

On 12 October 1998, they released their debut self-titled album, which reached No. 1 on the ARIA Albums Chart. It included the singles "Save the Day" (September 1998), "Prisoner of Society" (September 1999), and "All Torn Down". They have since received recognition worldwide, playing tours and festivals such as the Warped Tour in the United States and Reading and Leeds Festivals in the United Kingdom. Cheney wrote the group's other top 20 hits "Pictures in the Mirror" (2000), "Roll On" (2001), "One Said to the Other" (2003), "What's on Your Radio" (2005), and "Wake Up" (2006).

On 7 October 2006, Cheney told his fellow members of The Living End that he wished to leave the band. He "found himself going through a personal and creative crisis ... For the first time he was now also experiencing writer's block". However, the crisis passed and Cheney started writing again. In February 2008, under the pseudonym Longnecks, the group trialled the new tracks. In July, The Living End issued another top 20 single, "White Noise". The related album of the same name followed later that month. On 22 July 2011, they released their sixth studio album, The Ending Is Just the Beginning Repeating, which reached No. 3.

==== Solo career ====
In March 2022, Cheney announced his debut solo album, The Storm before the Calm, to be released 17 June. Alongside the announcement was the release of its lead single "California" and its film clip directed by Nick McKinlay. Cheney would later release "Football Team" as the second single from the album. On 2 June, Cheney announced an Australian tour in support of his debut album, alongside the third single "Corner Shop", with a film clip directed by Sean McDonald.

==== Other music projects ====
In 2003, Cheney performed alongside Australian rock veterans You Am I at the Big Day Out in Melbourne. They performed a track by The Clash as a tribute to Joe Strummer. In October 2004, Cheney joined the super group The Wrights, which performed a cover version of part one of Stevie Wright's track, "Evie – Let Your Hair Hang Down", at the ARIA Music Awards. Also in the group were Phil Jamieson (Grinspoon), Nic Cester (Jet), Kram (Spiderbait), and Davey Lane (You Am I). In January of the following year, they performed the entire three part 11-minute track at the WaveAid benefit concert, and released it as a single in February. In November 2007, The Wrights reconvened for another 'one-off' benefit concert, Roosistance, to perform "We Can't Be Beaten" – originally by Rose Tattoo.

In July 2005, Cheney performed a duet with Sarah McLeod (The Superjesus) on her second solo single, "Private School Kid". On 17 December that year, he joined Green Day on stage at the Docklands Stadium (Telstra Dome) to play "I Fought the Law". Cheney was not the Green Day bunny as was rumoured, it was Tré Cool, drummer for Green Day. Also in December, Cheney was a guest on SBS-TV's celebrity music trivia show, RocKwiz, with former Divinyls lead singer, Chrissy Amphlett – they performed "Stray Cat Blues" as a duet of The Rolling Stones' track. At the 2006 Jack Awards, he played in another super group, The Wrongs. They performed a Rose Tattoo track, "Bad Boy for Love", as a tribute to Peter Wells, the band's guitarist.

In February 2009, Cheney made a guest appearance on stage with the Stray Cats on their Australian Farewell Tour. He performed four songs alongside his childhood heroes, Brian Setzer, Lee Rocker, and Slim Jim Phantom. In August that year, Cheney took part in a series of concerts around Australia along with Tim Rogers (You Am I), Jamieson (Grinspoon), and Josh Pyke to celebrate The Beatles' White Album by performing the work in its entirety.

In 2010, Cheney made two solo recordings, "Distant Sun", a cover of Crowded House's track for a tribute album, He Will Have His Way in November; "Street Parade", a Christmas song, written by Cheney for a Christmas album by various artists, The Spirit of Christmas 2010. His first work as a record producer was for Melbourne indie rockers, Celadore, in October 2011 with their EP, The Bright and Blue. Also in October, Cheney was a guest on RocKwiz for a second time, he appeared with US-born rocker, Suzi Quatro – he performed "Heatwave" fronting the in-house band, RocKwiz Orkestra; and then "Stumblin' In" as a duet with Quatro.

In 2017, Cheney filled in for Chris Shiflett on the spring tour of "Me First and the Gimme Gimmes".

Cheney contributed a song, "I Won't Let You Down" to Jimmy Barnes' 2019 album, My Criminal Record. On 6 September 2019, "I Won't Let You Down" was released as the album's third single. In 2021, he formed a rockabilly band with Jimmy Barnes and Slim Jim Phantom.

In March 2023, Barnes announced the formation of supergroup The Barnestormers, featuring Barnes, Cheney, Slim Jim Phantom, Jools Holland and Kevin Shirley. A self-titled album was released on 26 May 2023.

== Equipment ==
Cheney's principal instrument is a Gretsch White Falcon and he uses mainly distortion and modulation effects. He has his own signature series Gretsch guitars. He is endorsed by Gretsch Guitars and uses a number of Gretsch models, including his new signature model guitar. On tour, Cheney takes about six guitars. He uses four main guitars, and the rest are back-ups for different tunings. He is playing through Wizard Modern Classic 100W heads and Wizard 4x12 cabinets.

=== Guitars ===
- Chris Cheney Signature G6126TCC
- Gretsch White Falcon 6136
- Gretsch White Falcon 6136 (1990s model)
- Gretsch 6120SSLVO ('06 Model)
- Gretsch 6116TVP "Power Tenny" (2006 Model)
- Gretsch 6118 Double Anniversary
- Various other Gretsch & Gibson Models

== Discography ==
=== Albums ===
List of albums, with selected details
Title	Album details	Peak chart positions
Title	Album details	AUS
The Storm before the Calm	Released: 17 June 2022; Label: Liberator; Formats: CD, digital download	8

=== with The Living End ===
- The Living End (1998)
- Roll On (2000)
- Modern Artillery (2003)
- State of Emergency (2006)
- White Noise (2008)
- The Ending Is Just the Beginning Repeating (2011)
- Shift (2016)
- Wunderbar (2018)
- I Only Trust Rock n Roll (2026)

== Awards and nominations ==
=== Jack Awards ===
- Best Lead Guitarist – 2004, 2005, and 2007
- Best Male – 2006

=== APRA Awards ===
The APRA Awards are presented annually from 1982 by the Australasian Performing Right Association (APRA).

Year	Nominee / work	Award	Result
2009	"White Noise" – Chris Cheney	Song of the Year	Won
2010	"Raise the Alarm" – Chris Cheney	Most Played Australian Work	Nominated
2010	"Raise the Alarm" – Chris Cheney	Rock Work of the Year	Nominated
2010	"White Noise" – Chris Cheney	Rock Work of the Year	Nominated
2019	"Don't Lose It" - Chris Cheney, Scott Owen, Andy Strachan, Tobias Kuhn	Song of the Year	Shortlisted
2020	"Otherside" - Chris Cheney, Scott Owen, Andy Strachan, Tobias Kuhn	Most Performed Rock Work of the Year	Nominated
