= The Living End =

Australian punk rock band

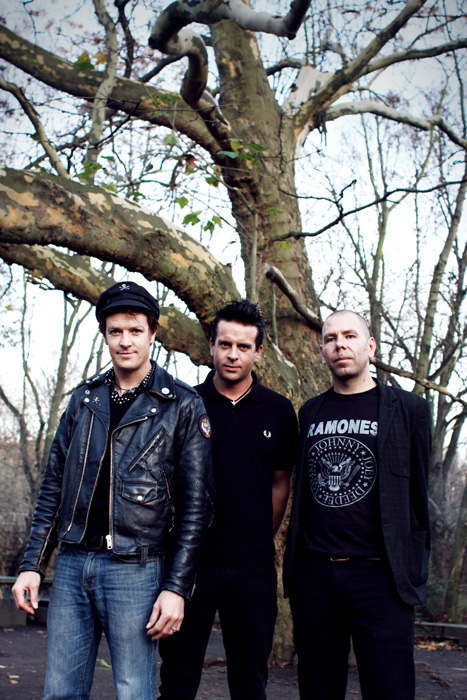
- Left to right: Chris Cheney, Andy Strachan, Scott Owen in Germany, 2009

Background information
- Also known as: The Longnecks; Safety Matches
- Origin: Melbourne, Victoria, Australia
- Genres: Punk rock; pop punk; rockabilly; alternative rock; psychobilly
- Years active: 1994–present
- Labels: Dine Alone; Dew Process; Deck Cheese; Adeline; EastWest; EMI; Modular; Rapido; Rise; Independent
- Members: Chris Cheney; Scott Owen; Andy Strachan
- Past members: Joey Piripitzi; Travis Demsey; Adrian Lombardi
- Website: thelivingend.com.au

The Living End is an Australian punk rock band from Melbourne, formed in 1994. Since 2002, the line-up consists of Chris Cheney (vocals, guitar), Scott Owen (double bass, vocals), and Andy Strachan (drums). The band rose to fame in 1997 after the release of their EP Second Solution / Prisoner of Society, which peaked at No. 4 on the Australian ARIA Singles Chart. They have released eight studio albums, two of which reached the No. 1 spot on the ARIA Albums Chart: The Living End (October 1998) and State of Emergency (February 2006). They have also achieved chart success in the U.S. and the United Kingdom.

The band was nominated 27 times and won six awards at the Australian ARIA Music Awards ceremonies: "Highest Selling Single" for Second Solution / Prisoner of Society (1998), "Breakthrough Artist – Album" and "Best Group" for The Living End (1999), as well as "Best Rock Album" for White Noise (2008) and The Ending Is Just the Beginning Repeating (2011), and Most Popular Australian Live Artist in (2011). In October 2010, their debut album was listed in the book "100 Best Australian Albums".

Australian musicologist Ian McFarlane described the group as "one of Australia’s premier rock acts. By blending a range of styles (punk, rockabilly and flat out rock) with great success, The Living End has managed to produce anthemic choruses and memorable songs in abundance".

At the 2026 ARIA Music Awards, they were inducted in the ARIA Hall of Fame.

== History ==
=== Beginnings (1994–1996) ===
The Living End were formed in 1994 by Chris Cheney and Scott Owen, who had met years earlier in primary school through their older sisters and began performing together from 1990 while attending Wheelers Hill Secondary College in Melbourne. Cheney and Owen had their first public gig at The Rob Roy in Melbourne in 1991. Cheney was a fan of rockabilly group Stray Cats and this prompted Owen, who originally played piano, to switch to double bass. The pair formed a cover band, The Runaway Boys, which performed Stray Cats and The Clash material. That group were named after a track, of the same name, from the Stray Cats self-titled debut album (February 1981). The Runaway Boys initially played in the local rockabilly music scene but expanded their audience by performing in regional towns and supporting Melbourne cover band Mercury Blue at the Wheelers Hill Hotel. Cheney later recalled "[w]e played to all the jivers and rock 'n' rollers ... And we slowly drifted into Melbourne's rockabilly scene". As Cheney and Owen persevered, the band went through several drummers, while they were still attending school.

By 1994, Cheney and Owen were writing their own material and decided to change the band's name to The Living End – a reference to the film, Rock Around the Clock (1956). According to Cheney "It's an old '50s term, meaning 'far out', 'the greatest' ... We were still into the whole '50s thing, but we wanted a neutral name, one that didn't suggest any one style of music". With Cheney on lead guitar and lead vocals, and Owen on double bass and backing vocals, the group settled on Joe Piripitzi as their drummer. Cheney considered Piripitzi to be ideal due to his charismatic appearance.

During that year they recorded a track, "Headlines", which had been co-written by Cheney and Owen. The group sent a T-shirt and demo tape to Green Day guitarist and lead vocalist, Billie Joe Armstrong, and landed a support slot for Green Day's 1995 Australian tour. After that tour, The Living End recorded additional tracks for their debut extended play, Hellbound, which received moderate support from community radio stations. It was produced by the group and included "Headlines" from the previous year. Ed Nimmervoll, an Australian musicologist, described the EP's sound: "they turned their back on '50s rock revivalism and adapted that instrumentation to original songs steeped in UK punk".

In November 1995, the trio recorded their second EP, It's for Your Own Good, which appeared in the following June. The six-track EP was co-produced by Lindsay Gravina (Underground Lovers, Cosmic Psychos), Mike Alonso (Jericho) and The Living End for the Rapido label. It included their first radio airplay hit, "From Here on In", which was placed on high rotation by national youth radio network, Triple J. Shortly after, Piripitzi was fired as his lifestyle choices were holding back the band. He was replaced on drums by Travis Demsey (later in The Knockout Drops). With Demsey the group appeared at major festivals: Pushover and the Falls Festival. Demsey's drum style was compared with The Who's Keith Moon. "From Here on In" was used on the soundtrack for the 1998 film, Occasional Course Language.

=== Breakout single to debut album (1997–1999) ===
The Living End toured Australia for a year, then in August 1997 they recorded new material to sell at their live shows. Their double A-sided single, "Second Solution" / "Prisoner of Society", was issued in January the following year. Also that month they had supported The Offspring on the Australian leg of their tour. "Second Solution" / "Prisoner of Society" peaked at No. 4 on the ARIA Singles Chart, and was certified double-platinum by ARIA for shipment of 140,000 copies. At the ARIA Music Awards of 1998 it won the Highest Selling Single category; and eventually became the highest selling Australian single of the 1990s. It lasted a record-breaking 47 weeks in the Top 50.

In October 1998 it peaked at No. 28 on the New Zealand Singles Chart. It was later featured in the game, Guitar Hero World Tour. "Second Solution" was used in the soundtrack for the 2002 movie, Cheats, which starred Trevor Fehrman, Matthew Lawrence, and Mary Tyler Moore. Early in 1998 "Prisoner of Society" was issued as a separate single in the United Kingdom and, the following year, in the US. The single appeared in the top 200 of the UK Singles Chart, and peaked at No. 23 on the Billboard's Alternative Songs Chart.

The band signed with Modular Recordings for the release of their debut self-titled album, which appeared on 12 October 1998, and was co-produced by Gravina with the trio. It peaked at No. 1 on the ARIA Albums Chart, became the then-second highest-selling debut rock album in Australian music history and, by 1999, was certified 4× Platinum for shipment of 280,000 units. Their next Australian single, "Save the Day" with accompanying video directed by Joel Noble, was issued in September 1998, a month ahead of the album. It made the top 30 on the ARIA Singles Chart. It became their highest charting hit on the New Zealand Singles Chart, where it reached No. 10. From the album, a total of six singles were released including a live cover version of "Tainted Love", which was issued as a radio-only single on Triple J. At the ARIA Music Awards of 1999, The Living End won two more awards: Best Group and Breakthrough Artist – Album. At the ceremony they were also nominated for Album of the Year and Highest Selling Album. In October 2010 their debut album was listed in the book 100 Best Australian Albums.

=== Roll On (2000–2001) ===
The Living End's second album, Roll On, was recorded during July 2000 with Nick Launay (Midnight Oil, Models, Silverchair) producing and appeared in November that year. It peaked at No. 8 on the ARIA Albums Chart and reached the top 40 in New Zealand. Although Roll On was a more creative work, Nimmervoll mentioned that they had "broadened their musical scope while keeping in tact [sic] what made them unique - the instrumentation and the socially-aware lyrics". The album did not achieve the status of their earlier album as it was certified platinum for shipment of 70,000 copies. Despite this, fans consider it to be as strong as the self-titled album; "[it's] an absolute scorcher! That's what years of live honing can do for a band that was already white-hot".

Cheney later stated that he was trying to prove to critics that The Living End were not a band simply defined by their hit, "Prisoner of Society", and the album showed this by displaying other influences, as well as their traditional fast-paced rockabilly music. Rolling Stone' Jenny Eiscu compared it to The Clash's creative breakthrough, London Calling (December 1979), as they "stomp all over the boundaries between punk, reggae, rockabilly and plain old rock & roll – and it still sounds like a revelation, twenty-two years after [T]he Clash did it. The pupils don't quite outpace the masters here ... But the band is obviously having such a riotously good time that you'd be a sucker not to stomp your foot and join the party". Much of the style was comparable to 1980s hard rock and pub rock, as well as many tracks being obscure mixes of many ideas, resulting in 'procrastinating' structures. This defined the album's creativity.

The album's first two singles, "Pictures in the Mirror" and the title track, peaked into the top 20 on the ARIA Singles Chart. "Pictures in the Mirror" also reached the top 20 in New Zealand, while "Roll On" peaked at No. 33 on the Billboard Alternative Songs Chart, and appeared in the top 150 of the UK Singles Chart. In March 2001 Billboard's review of Roll On described their sound as "Aussie punkabilly", while the group's lyrics show a "socially progressive attitude, discussing prejudice, racism, and political conflict". The trio received US-wide coverage by playing on both Conan O'Brien's and David Letterman's late-night variety shows. The album included "Carry me Home", which appeared on the Guitar Hero II soundtrack. However, touring in support of Roll On and the related singles was halted after Cheney had a car accident on the Great Ocean Road, rendering him unable to play for a significant period of time: he was "hospitalised for 2 months". He had been on travelling to the house of a member of fellow Australian band and tour mates, Bodyjar.

=== The Longnecks to Modern ARTillery (2002–2005) ===
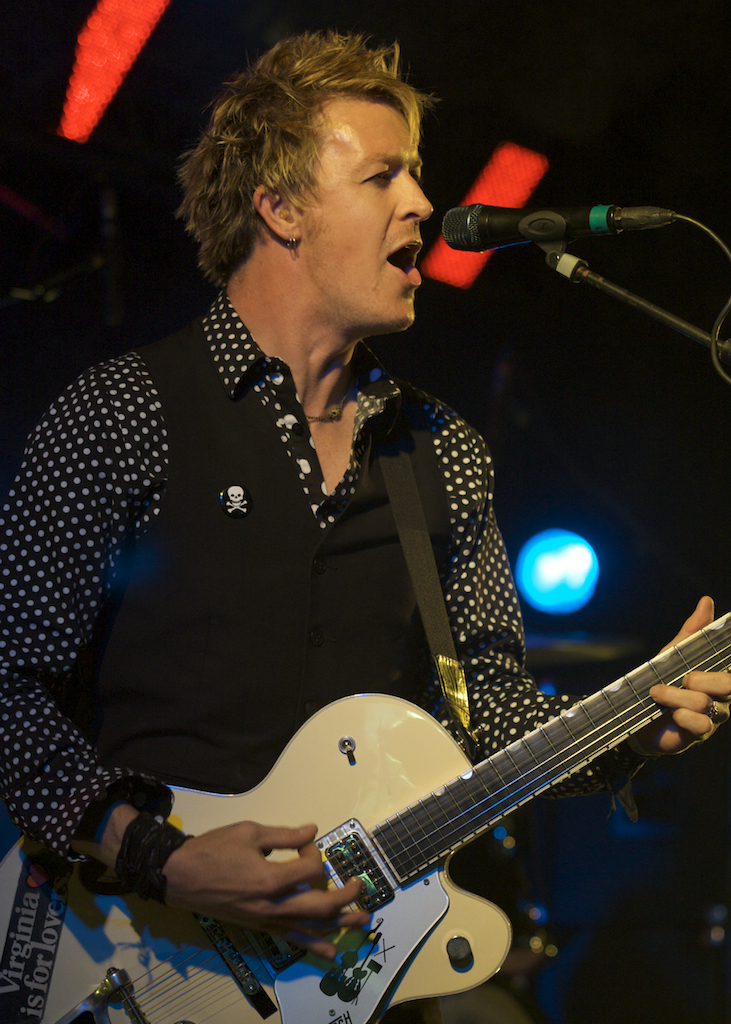
Chris Cheney performing in 2009. He founded the band in 1994 as their singer-songwriter and lead guitarist. In September 2001, he had been injured in a car accident and was hospitalised for two months. In October 2006, he told other group members that he wanted to quit as he had writer's block; however, he returned to songwriting and performing with the band by April 2007.

In February 2002, The Living End's line up changed as Demsey left and was replaced on drums in April by Andy Strachan (ex-Pollyanna). Dempsey wanted to spend more time with his family, and had a dislike of heavy touring; in August that year he joined Fez Perez, and later joined a punk, folk rock group, The Currency. The Living End developed a side project, The Longnecks, to test out Strachan and new material for their third album, Modern ARTillery, without attracting wide public attention. The name is a reference to longneck beer bottles. The Longnecks name was re-used by the band to try out potential material for later albums. They have also played under other names: Glen Waverley & The Mentones, The Dovetones, Roller Toasters, Doncaster & The Dandenongs and Redwings; at various venues in regional Victoria.

In mid-2002 The Living End recorded four tracks, including "One Said to the Other", which were released as an EP in January the following year and reached the top 20 on the ARIA Singles Chart. Two of its tracks were re-recorded in Los Angeles with Mark Trombino (Blink-182, Jebediah) producing, together with new material for Modern ARTillery, which appeared on 28 October 2003. It peaked at No. 3 on the ARIA Albums Chart, top 50 in New Zealand, and top 40 on Billboard's Heatseekers Albums Chart. "Who's Gonna Save Us?" was issued a month earlier, as the lead single, which reached top 40 in Australia, top 30 in New Zealand and on Billboard's Alternative Songs Chart. They followed with heavy touring (including Big Day Out) promoting their releases.

On 27 September 2004 the band released a compilation album, From Here on In: The Singles 1997-2004, early versions included a bonus disc, Under the Covers, which had six cover versions of other artist's tracks. The CD featured two new tracks: "I Can't Give You What I Haven't Got" and "Bringing It All Back Home". They also issued a compilation DVD, From Here on In: The DVD 1997–2004, which collated their music video clips and live performances of the groups at festivals: Splendour in the Grass and Big Day Out in Sydney, and from Summer Sonic in Japan. The DVD also documented the band's history by interviews and home footage.

=== State of Emergency (2005–2007) ===
Scott Owen during The Living End's 2007 United Kingdom tour. He co-founded the group with Cheney in 1994 and cites Lee Rocker of Stray Cats as his main influence: Owen mimicked Rocker's right hand movements on the upright bass when he first learned how to play.

The Living End's fourth studio album, State of Emergency, was recorded in Byron Bay with Launay producing, following the band's appearance at Splendour in the Grass. The recording and the artwork was completed in mid-December 2005, and the album was released on 4 February the following year. The Living End had again played gigs as The Longnecks, before recording the album, to test out the new material. It peaked at No. 1 on the ARIA Albums Chart in its first week, it reached top 40 in New Zealand, and on Billboard's Alternative Songs Chart.

The lead single, "What's on Your Radio?", had been issued in November 2005, and reached No. 9 on the ARIA Singles Chart. The second single, "Wake Up", was released in February just after the album and reached No. 5. It became their highest charting single in New Zealand where it peaked at No. 12. The third single, "Long Live the Weekend", was released in May, and appeared in the top 30 in Australia. The fourth single, "Nothing Lasts Forever", was released in August and also reached the top 40. The album was nominated for the 2006 J Award.

The album was issued in the US through Green Day's Armstrong's Adeline Records along with Eastwest Records on 11 July 2006 and in Canada a week later. Another release in support of the album was the DVD, Live at Festival Hall, on 30 September, which captured a Melbourne performance during the State of Emergency Tour, and featured many songs from the album, and earlier tracks. On 20 June 2006 the band received four Jack Awards: Best Live Band, Best Live TV Performance, Best Performer (Cheney) and Best Drummer (Strachan). Thereby the group achieved the most awards in a year and, at eight overall, the most by any artist. During the 2006 State of Emergency tour, the Living End's show in Milwaukee was cancelled, so it was rescheduled on 2 December as a support act for +44.

On 6 October Cheney left the band because he felt burnt out, he was sick of the constant touring, as well as experiencing writer's block. Cheney felt that he needed to get away from the band and develop other aspects of his life. This information was kept confidential until 2008. Early in 2007 Cheney had isolated himself from his bandmates while trying to write tracks for a follow-up to State of Emergency. He was disappointed with the results so he took up yoga, spent time painting and being around his baby daughter whilst taking a break from music for the first time in 10 years. During this period the band released a radio-only single, a cover version of Cold Chisel's "Rising Sun", available on the Standing on the Outside (March 2007), a Cold Chisel tribute album by various Australian artists. After Cheney overcame his writer's block and was convinced not to leave the band, the group played The Great Escape in April 2007 and restarted work on their fifth studio album. They toured the UK in August that year, releasing State of Emergency there on 13 August through Deck Cheese Records.

=== White Noise (2008–2009) ===
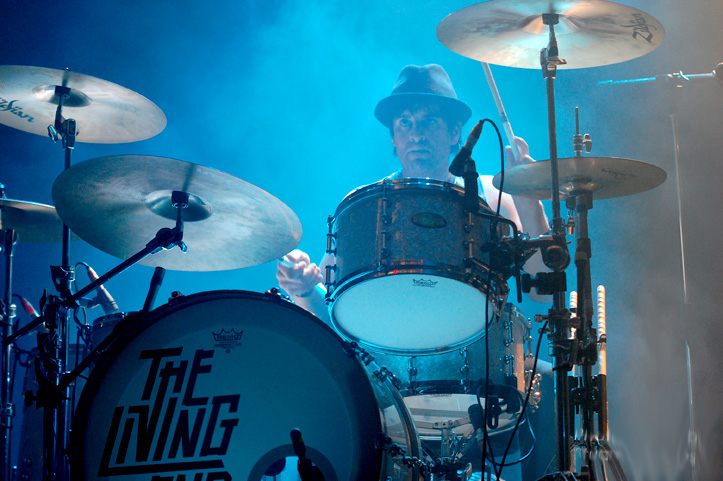
Andy Strachan behind his kit in 2008. He joined in April 2002 by replacing previous drummer Travis Demsey. In 2006, Strachan won the Jack Award for Best Drummer. In November 2007, he reflected on the group's ambition, "we have no qualms about going back [overseas] and living on a bus for months at a time ... I think we still have a really good shot of it over there. We just have to get to the next level. It's about having the right song at the right time".

The Living End released their fifth studio album, White Noise, on 19 July 2008. The trio had performed at The Age's Entertainment Guide's EG Awards in Melbourne in December 2007. Two new songs had been premiered, "Raise the Alarm" and "How Do We Know". During February the following year they played gigs as The Longnecks to test out more new material prior to recording. The gigs were described by Cheney as the most exciting of their career, "there is a heaviness and depth to the new stuff that we simply haven't had before".

Pre-production for the album took place at Studio One in Collingwood, Melbourne with producer Kalju Tonuma. This included various co-writes including the track "Sum of Us". After the sonic blueprint of the album was established, producer John Agnello (Sonic Youth, The Hold Steady) was engaged to commence recording at Water Music Studios in Hoboken, New Jersey, for their new label, Dew Process, on the week beginning 31 March. Cheney felt Agnello "[could] capture the energy and attack we are after". Brendan O'Brien mixed the record at Silent Sound Studios in Atlanta, Georgia. The Age's Andrew Murfett declared they "have never been able to convey the energy and power of their live shows on record ... [this album] is fresh, diverse and relatively honest, and TLE suddenly got a lot more interesting". White Noise peaked at No. 2 on the ARIA Albums Chart in its first week, it reached No. 18 in New Zealand – becoming their highest charting album there. In support of the album, they made TV appearances, including a performance on 5 October at the 2008 NRL Grand Final at ANZ Stadium. At the ARIA Music Awards of 2008, White Noise was awarded the Best Rock Album, over efforts from Gyroscope and Faker.

The first single issued from the album included the title track. Another song, "How Do We Know", was simultaneously released as a radio-only track on Triple J, and was heard on other radio stations, such as Nova 969. The tracks formed a double A-sided single, which was issued both physically and digitally in July 2008. It reached No. 12 on the ARIA Singles Chart, and top 30 in New Zealand. White Noise had almost a year-and-a-half of writing behind it, showing "more of a hard rock influence" and the group declared it's "the best thing we've ever done". In September that year a second single, "Moment in the Sun", was released to Australian radio; it was physically and digitally released a month later. In December "Raise the Alarm" was released to radio as the third single. A music video had been issued containing footage of live performances during the White Noise Tour and some others. In February 2009 the band made a secret appearance in Melbourne supporting the Stray Cats on their Farewell Tour. In the wake of the Black Saturday bushfires in regional Victoria, the band traveled to relief centers in Yea, Alexandra, and Kinglake, playing acoustic sets for communities and giving away shirts and other merchandise to affected community members. They also performed as part of the Australia Unites bushfire relief telethon, contributing $10,000 themselves, and the song White Noise was included on the charity compilation album Bushire Aid. In May The Living End started the Raise the Alarm Tour.

=== The Ending Is Just the Beginning Repeating (2010–2015) ===
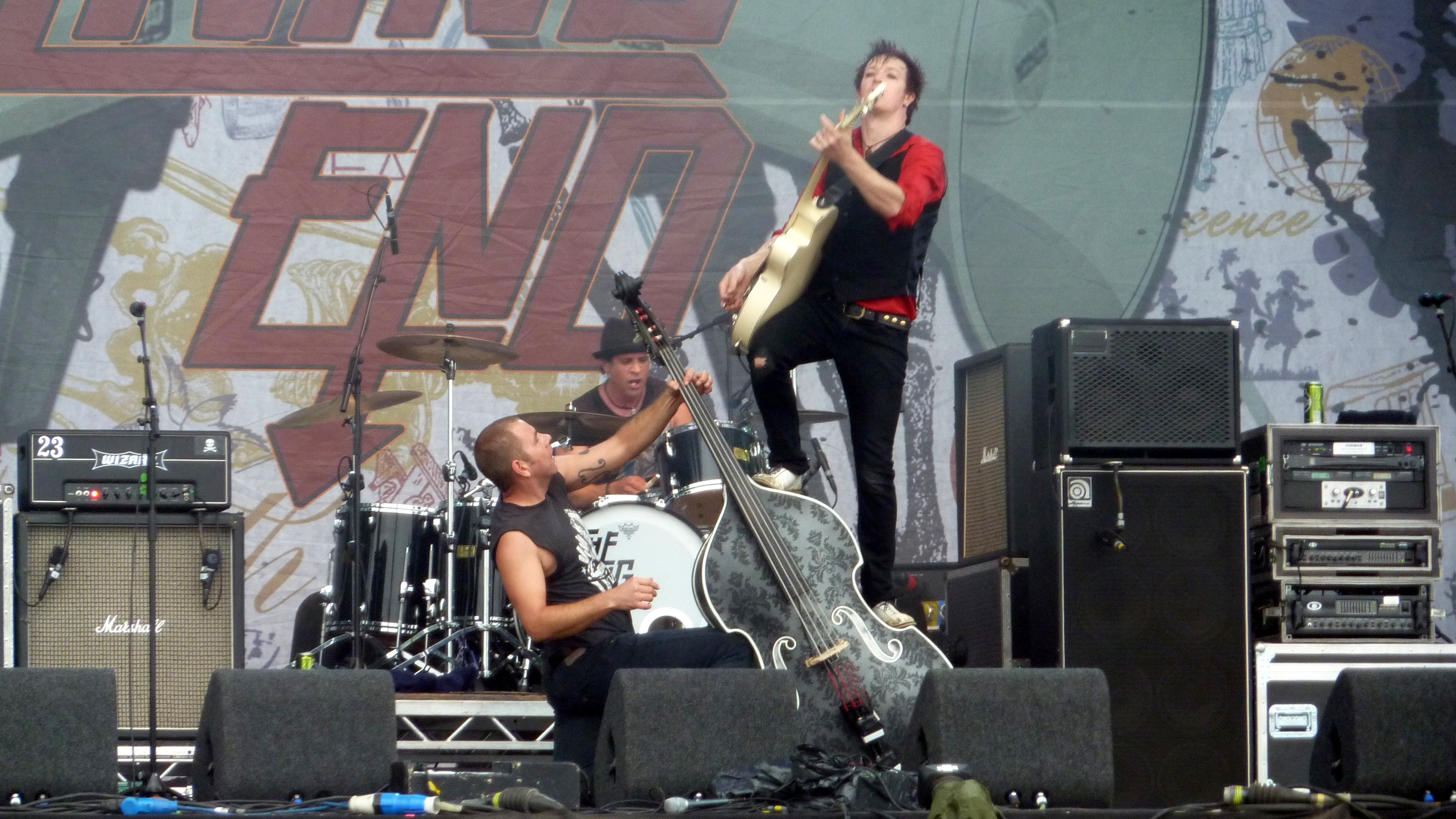
The Living End performing in Berkshire, England, August 2009. Owen plays his double bass while Cheney clambers atop. Strachan is behind his drum kit.

During September and October 2010 The Living End performed under another alias, Safety Matches, testing new material, similar to the previous usage of The Longnecks, for their sixth album, The Ending Is Just The Beginning Repeating. The tracks vetted included "United", "Universe", "Away from the City" (then-titled "Black and White"), the title track, "Resist" and "Heatwave". In the January 2011 edition of The Living End's News, Cheney revealed "[h]aving spent all of 2010 writing album 6 we have amassed something in the vicinity of 40+ songs to choose from... There are some really different ideas kicking around this time but the emphasis has been on creating a cohesive album that is heavy, melodic and overall very anthemic".

The title track was premiered as the lead single in early June 2011 on national radio stations. The album appeared on 22 July that year, it was produced by Nick DiDia (Powderfinger). On 17 July Triple J played tracks from the album with further tracks played through the week prior to its release. The Living End also allowed fans on their mailing list a 24-hour stream of the record on 18 July. Fans could listen as many times as they wanted and were able to comment on the stream. In support of the album a live stream of a performance occurred on YouTube on 19 July. This featured an additional guitarist as well as Cheney playing rhythm guitar. From 2011 the band has employed Adrian Lombardi (ex-Mid Youth Crisis, Blueline Medic) on stage as their second guitarist. In July 2012 Cheney announced on Triple J that throughout November and December of that year, as part of The Retrospective Tour, they would perform each of their six studio albums over a week, in each of five Australian state capitals (Perth, Adelaide, Sydney, Brisbane and Melbourne).

The Living End played in the UK and Germany throughout August and September 2013, and headlined at the Summernats 27 in Canberra in 2014.

The Living End also played at the 2014 Soundwave Festival in Australia as a replacement for Stone Temple Pilots who had to pull out due to scheduling conflicts with the recording of their next album.

The Living End supported Cold Chisel in their One Night Stand tour, with shows at Townsville, Darwin, Perth, Macedon Ranges and Sydney.

=== Shift (2015–2017) ===
The Living End announced they finished their seventh studio album in 2015. On 15 March 2016, the band released a song called "Monkey" as a taste of the album. "Monkey" is not the first official single off the album but was played live at the Decades Music Festival in 2015, along with another track called "Death". On 21 March 2016 the band officially announced the new album, Shift with a release date of 13 May 2016, alongside a national tour and the release of the single, "Keep on Running".

"Staring Down The Barrel", the final single from the album, was released in October 2016. The song was inspired by Cheney's battles with alcohol.

=== Wunderbar (2018–present) ===
On 22 June 2018, The Living End released a new song, "Don't Lose It". The band played two special pub shows in Sydney and Melbourne to launch the new single.

On 10 July 2018, the band officially announced their eighth album, Wunderbar, with a release date of 28 September 2018. Following this announcement, a video was launched for the previously released single "Don't Lose It". The video is a parody of reality talent contests, such as The Voice and Idols, and features cameos from many Australian musicians and personalities, such as Jimmy Barnes, Jane Gazzo, Molly Meldrum, Daryl Braithwaite and Murray Cook.

Wunderbar was recorded over a six-week period in February 2018, in Berlin, Germany, with producer Tobias Kuhn. Kuhn was brought on as producer after being recommended by German punk band, Die Toten Hosen. Wunderbar peaked at No. 3 on the ARIA charts.

== Musical style and influences ==
The Living End consider themselves to be a rock 'n' roll band based on punk ethics, citing The Clash, Iggy Pop, The Who and The Jam as influences and bands with whom they share the same ideals, making a social commentary on what's going on around them. They have also been compared favorably to 1990s punk revivalists Rancid. However, the band do not consider themselves a punk band, more a rock 'n' roll band who are influenced by punk. Allmusic's Stephen Thomas Erlewine reviewed their debut album, he noted their "sound owes far more to the Ramones than it does to Eddie Cochran, or even the Clash, but they've cleverly appropriated certain rockabilly signatures – most ridiculously, the upright acoustic bass – that give their homage to the golden age of punk a bit of charm".

Cheney regards 1950s rock 'n' roll, including Elvis Presley, as his greatest influence and first musical love which, along with 1980s rockabilly revival band Stray Cats, the band's sound was based on.

Owen has said that his favourite bands include Stray Cats, Reverend Horton Heat, Midnight Oil, The Clash, The Jam, Green Day, Sublime, Bodyjar, The Brian Setzer Orchestra, Rancid, The Beatles and Supergrass. Owen regards Lee Rocker of Stray Cats as his main performance influence, mimicking the right hand movements of Rocker on the upright bass when he first learnt how to play.

As The Runaway Boys the trio had performed 1950s rock revival to "all the jivers and rock 'n' rollers". They also regard Australian pub rock as an important influence on the band, something the members grew up with and appreciated. Other rockabilly influences include Reverend Horton Heat and Eddie Cochran Their rockabilly influences were tempered by exposure to differing forms "[w]e'd support a jazz band one night, and a metal band the following. It helped us a lot". Allmusic's MacKenzie Wilson found that by Roll On the group had grown up "but continue to rampage on with their rowdy punkabilly ... their sophomore effort pulls toward their Aussie rock roots (AC/DC, Rose Tattoo) and a touch of British class for an eager modification".

They acknowledge the inspiration of 1970s punk groups and The Sharp. Billboard's review of Roll On described their sound as "Aussie punkabilly", while the group's lyrics show a "socially progressive attitude, discussing prejudice, racism, and political conflict" The Worldwide Home of Australasian Music and More Online website reviewed their early releases, with The Living End described as "anthemic and attitudinous brand of rockabilly-meets-punk (circa Clash not SoCal)"; Roll On had them as "kings of rockapunkerbilly"; for Modern Artillery Cheney's lyrics were lauded with "every time I expect the quality to wane, a new level is reached" and the band itself showed that "Nobody plays nitro-powered punkabilly faster or tighter than this combo and Modern Artillery represents the band's finest hour". However Allmusic's Johnny Loftus found that album showed that the "bawdy gang vocals of 2001's Roll On have been replaced by sculpted multi-tracking ... guitars punch mightily, and the choruses detonate, but they do in colors easily identifiable to a throng of American baby punks with silver safety pins in their mouths".

Allmusic's Hal Horowitz found that by State of Emergency the group "takes its Stray Cats strut and Reverend Horton Heat bluster and continues to channel it into a more commercially viable pop/punk sound ... [it] sounds more like a buffed up Jam album, all snappy hooks and impassioned vocals over a rollicking set of songs". Fellow Allmusic reviewer Adam Greenberg found that on White Noise the group "experiments a bit with new sounds but also seems to hang right on the edge of what they had been doing previously". Dave Donnelly opined that the band "have been mining the territory between pop-punk and rockabilly for well over a decade now, and their experience shines through in the slick musicianship" of The Ending Is Just the Beginning Repeating.

While not generally considered a 'political' punk rock band, they have songs such as Who's Gonna Save Us? with political overtones. In 2025, in response to their music being used by anti-immigration protestors and neo-Nazis at March for Australia rallies, the band commented:

We’ve been made aware that two of our songs were played at the anti-immigration marches over the weekend by members of a neo-Nazi group. To be absolutely clear, the goals and philosophies of these marches are abhorrent to us, and we don’t support them in any way. ... In summary: Fuck Nazis.”

Amongst other bands, Sum 41 guitarist Dave Baksh has suggested that it would be great if he could tour with The Living End, saying that they're all "really good musicians".

== Collaborations ==
The Living End have made recordings with many popular bands and artists. In 1998, just as they were gaining popularity in Australia, they performed at "Tour of Duty" for the peace keepers in East Timor. At this, their first live concert to Australians, they performed two tracks from what was their upcoming album, as well as performing with The Angels' frontman Doc Neeson and "Jingle Bell Rock" with Australian pop singer Kylie Minogue.

In December 1998, supporting the German band Die Toten Hosen they played a cover of Slade's "Merry Christmas" with them on 26 December 1998 in Düsseldorf, as part of Die Toten Hosen's 1998 Christmas tour of Germany. The two bands met on the 1998 inaugural Warped Tour of Australia, New Zealand, Japan and Hawaii. In early 2001 The Living End performed as the support act for AC/DC during the Australian leg of their Stiff Upper Lip world tour.

For their 2000 release, How It Works, Cheney performed backing vocals on Bodyjar's song "Halfway Around The World".

Lead singer and guitarist Chris Cheney was also a member of the "super group" The Wrights who released covers of Stevie Wright's songs, "Evie Parts 1, 2 & 3" after performing "Evie Part 1" at the 2004 Australian Music Industry's ARIA Music Awards. Cheney also played guitar and contributed backing vocals to "Private School Kid" on Sarah McLeod's (formerly of The Superjesus) debut solo album. Cheney appeared as a guest guitarist on Stephen Cummings' Firecracker album.

The Living End performed alongside Normie Rowe performing two of Normie's hits "Que Sera Sera" and "Shakin' All Over" at the 2005 ARIA Hall of Fame. In 2005, the band recorded a version of Ashton, Gardner and Dyke's "Resurrection Shuffle" with Jimmy Barnes on his duet album Double Happiness. The Living End also appeared on Australian country and western music artist Kasey Chambers' album Barricades & Brickwalls, contributing the music and backing vocals to "Crossfire".

On Australian band Jet's live DVD, Right Right Right, Chris Cheney appears at the end of the recorded concert to feature on a cover of Elvis Presley's "That's Alright Mamma". Chris Cheney also played "I Fought the Law" with Green Day at their Melbourne concert on 17 December 2005. Double bassist Scott Owen appeared on Australian legend Paul Kelly's Foggy Highway album, playing bass on "Song of the Old Rake". Scott also appeared in the film clip for the track.

Cheney was the guest guitarist on the song, "Something More", which appears on the album, Lose Your Delusion, by Melbourne duo Over-reactor. Cheney will also feature on Grinspoon's seventh studio album playing a guitar solo.

The Living End have also featured on Jimmy Barnes' album, 30:30 Hindsight, which was released in 2014, where they covered "Lay Down Your Guns". The song was then released as a music video to assist in the promotion of the album.

In 2017, Chris Cheney featured on the Luke Yeoward's album Ghosts, with vocals and guitar contribution to the song "Whose Side Are You On?"

== Members ==
=== Current members ===
- Chris Cheney – lead vocals, guitar (1994–present)
- Scott Owen – double bass, backing vocals (1994–present)
- Andy Strachan – drums, backing vocals (2002–present)

=== Former members ===
- Joe Piripitzi – drums (1994–1996)
- Travis Demsey – drums, backing vocals (1996–2002)
- Adrian Lombardi – guitar, backing vocals (2011–2013, 2017; touring)

== Discography ==
=== Studio albums ===
- The Living End (1998)
- Roll On (2000)
- Modern Artillery (2003)
- State of Emergency (2006)
- White Noise (2008)
- The Ending Is Just the Beginning Repeating (2011)
- Shift (2016)
- Wunderbar (2018)
- I Only Trust Rock n Roll (2025)

== Awards and nominations ==
- They hold the record for the most consecutive entries in Triple J's Hottest 100. The band made the chart every year between 1997 and 2006.
- The band won a total of nine awards at the Jack Awards – for Australian live music – from the first ceremony in 2004 to the final one in 2007. They have won more than any other artist as a whole and individually for 2006 and 2005 (2005 was actually a tie with Grinspoon on two awards). Of these, three awards for Best Guitarist (Cheney), one award for Best Live Male Performer (Cheney), two awards for Best Bassist (Owen), one award for Best Drummer (Strachan), one award for Best Live Band, and one award for Best Live Performance (on Channel V).
- In July 2009, Prisoner of Society was voted number 34 by the Australian public in "Triple J Hottest 100 of All Time".

In July 2011, the band's self-titled album, The Living End, was voted number 4 by the Australian public in "Triple J Hottest 100 Australian Albums of All Time".

=== APRA Awards ===
The APRA Awards are presented annually from 1982 by the Australasian Performing Right Association (APRA).

| Year | Nominee / work | Award | Result |
|---|---|---|---|
| 2009 | "White Noise" – Chris Cheney | Song of the Year | Won |
| 2010 | "Raise the Alarm" – Chris Cheney | Most Played Australian Work | Nominated |
| 2010 | "Raise the Alarm" – Chris Cheney | Rock Work of the Year | Nominated |
| 2010 | "White Noise" – Chris Cheney | Rock Work of the Year | Nominated |
| 2012 | "The Ending Is Just the Beginning Repeating" - Chris Cheney, Craig Finn | Song of the Year | Shortlisted |
| 2013 | "For Another Day" | Rock Work of the Year | Nominated |
| 2019 | "Don't Lose It" – Chris Cheney, Scott Owen, Andy Strachan, Tobias Kuhn | Song of the Year | Shortlisted |
| 2020 | "Otherside" – Chris Cheney, Scott Owen, Andy Strachan, Tobias Kuhn | Most Performed Rock Work of the Year | Nominated |

=== ARIA Music Awards ===
The ARIA Music Awards are an annual series presented by Australian Recording Industry Association (ARIA) since 1987, which recognise excellence, innovation, and achievement across all genres of Australian music. The Living End have won a total of six awards from thirty nominations. They were inducted into the ARIA Hall of Fame in 2026.

| Year | Category | Recipient(s) and nominee(s) | Result | Ref(s). |
|---|---|---|---|---|
| 1998 | Single of the Year | "Second Solution / Prisoner of Society" | Nominated | |
| 1998 | Highest Selling Single | "Second Solution / Prisoner of Society" | Won | |
| 1998 | Best Independent Release | "Second Solution / Prisoner of Society" | Nominated | |
| 1998 | Best Alternative Release | "Second Solution / Prisoner of Society" | Nominated | |
| 1998 | Song of the Year | "Prisoner of Society" | Nominated | |
| 1999 | Album of the Year | The Living End | Nominated | |
| 1999 | Highest Selling Album | The Living End | Nominated | |
| 1999 | Best Group | The Living End – The Living End | Won | |
| 1999 | Breakthrough Artist – Album | The Living End – The Living End | Won | |
| 2001 | Best Rock Album | Roll On | Nominated | |
| 2001 | Engineer of the Year | Nick Launay – Roll On | Nominated | |
| 2001 | Producer of the Year | Nick Launay – Roll On | Nominated | |
| 2004 | Best Rock Album | Modern Artillery | Nominated | |
| 2006 | Best Group | State of Emergency | Nominated | |
| 2006 | Best Rock Album | State of Emergency | Nominated | |
| 2006 | Best Cover Art | Alison Smith, Chris Cheney – State of Emergency | Nominated | |
| 2006 | Best Video | Sean Gilligan, Sarah-Jane Woulahan – "Wake Up" | Nominated | |
| 2006 | Engineer of the Year | Nick Launay – State of Emergency | Nominated | |
| 2006 | Producer of the Year | Nick Launay – State of Emergency | Nominated | |
| 2007 | Best Music DVD | Live at Festival Hall | Nominated | |
| 2008 | Album of the Year | White Noise | Nominated | |
| 2008 | Single of the Year | "White Noise" | Nominated | |
| 2008 | Best Group | The Living End – White Noise | Nominated | |
| 2008 | Best Rock Album | White Noise | Won | |
| 2011 | Best Group | The Ending Is Just the Beginning Repeating | Nominated | |
| 2011 | Best Rock Album | The Ending Is Just the Beginning Repeating | Won | |
| 2011 | Most Popular Australian Live Artist | The Living End | Won | |
| 2012 | Best Australian Live Act | The Ending Is Just the Beginning Repeating Tour | Nominated | |
| 2016 | Best Rock Album | Shift | Nominated | |
| 2016 | Best Australian Live Act | Shift Tour | Nominated | |
| 2026 | Themselves | ARIA Hall of Fame | inducted | |

== Video games ==
- "End of the World" was featured in Tony Hawk's Underground 2, a skateboarding video game.
- "Carry Me Home" was featured in the video game Guitar Hero II as a playable song using the guitar peripheral.
- "West End Riot" was featured in the video game World of Outlaws: Sprint Cars 2002 in the opening film clip.
- "Prisoner of Society" was featured in the video game Guitar Hero: World Tour as a playable song, as well as in the Guitar Hero: World Tour meme 'Bike Hero'. The song was included in a 19 December 2008 DLC release for the Xbox 360 karaoke video game Lips. It was also featured in the game Supercross 2000 by Electronic Arts, along with their track "I Want a Day."
