= Travis Demsey =

Australian musician

Travis Demsey is an Australian musician who served as the former drummer for The Living End from May 1996 to February 2002. He currently works as a youth worker and is the drummer for the Melbourne band Double Black and Stripped Black.
