= Scott Owen =

Australian musician (born 1975)

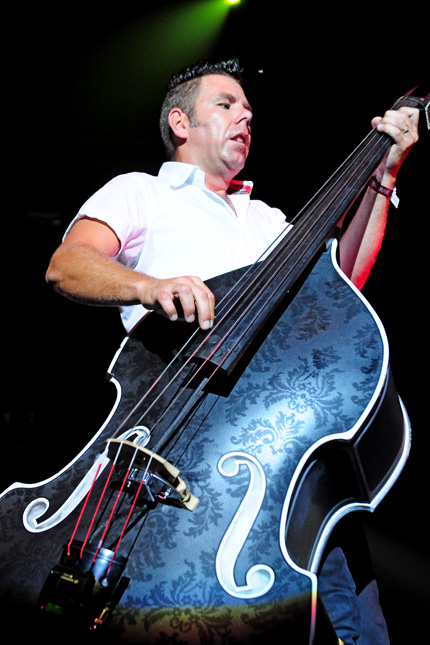
- Owen performing at the 2011 Southbound Festival

Background information
- Born: 14 February 1975 (age 51); Melbourne, Victoria, Australia
- Occupation: Bassist
- Instruments: Bass; upright bass; vocals; piano
- Years active: 1992–present
- Member of: The Living End

Scott Bradley Owen (born 14 February 1975) is an Australian musician who currently plays for the punk rock/psychobilly band The Living End.

== Career ==
After playing the piano for many years, he decided that the keys would not work for a rockabilly band, so at age seventeen, he purchased and taught himself double bass, so he could play rockabilly with best friend and bandmate, the vocalist and guitarist Chris Cheney.

During their live shows, Owen is known for pulling his "bass stunts", most notably standing on the bass (or letting Chris Cheney stand on it), tilting it on an Angle, resting his right foot on the curve by the f-hole and his left foot over the belly of the bass near the bottom of the fingerboard.

Owen has also written a number of tracks for The Living End, including "Flood The Sky", "I Want A Day", "What Would You Do?" and "Stay Away From Me". He also co-wrote "So Lonely" and "Black Cat" with Chris Cheney and "Short Notice" and "E-Boogie" with Chris Cheney and Andy Strachan.

He played double bass for Paul Kelly on his song "Song of the Old Rake" and features in the filmclip, set in a Bendigo radio station.

Owen uses Ampeg cabinets and heads, separate channels for bass and slap pickups.

Owen has two children, Harvey and Ginger, with his wife Emilie.

He is co-credited with Ash Grunwald on the 2013 album, Gargantua.

== Awards and nominations ==
=== APRA Awards ===
The APRA Awards are presented annually from 1982 by the Australasian Performing Right Association (APRA).

Year	Nominee / work	Award	Result
2019	"Don't Lose It" - Chris Cheney, Scott Owen, Andy Strachan, Tobias Kuhn	Song of the Year	Shortlisted
2020	"Otherside" - Chris Cheney, Scott Owen, Andy Strachan, Tobias Kuhn	Most Performed Rock Work of the Year	Nominated
