= Missy Higgins discography =

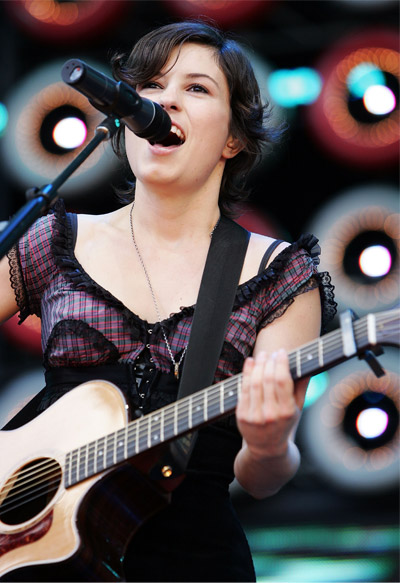
- Higgins performing at the Live Earth concert, Sydney in 2007
- Studio albums: 5
- Extended plays: 2
- Live albums: 1
- Compilation albums: 2
- Singles: 38
- Video albums: 1
- Miscellaneous: 6

The discography of Australian singer-songwriter and musician Missy Higgins consists of five studio albums, two extended plays, thirty eight singles (including four as a featured artist) and one download-only live album. In 2001, Higgins won the national Unearthed radio competition for unsigned artists with her song "All for Believing" and shortly after signed a recording contract with Eleven. The following year she signed an international contract with Warner Bros. She released a self-titled EP in November 2003. Her debut album, The Sound of White, was released 6 September 2004. It reached No. 1 on the Australian albums chart and was certified nine times platinum by the Australian Recording Industry Association (ARIA). It contained the singles "Scar", "Ten Days", "The Special Two" and "The Sound of White".

Higgins' second album, On a Clear Night, was released 28 April 2007. Like its predecessor, it reached No. 1 on the Australian albums chart and was certified three times platinum by ARIA. On a Clear Night produced three singles: "Steer", "Where I Stood" and "Peachy".

Higgins' sixth studio album, The Second Act was released in September 2024.

== Albums ==
=== Studio albums ===
Title	Album details	Peak chart positions			Certifications
Title	Album details	AUS	NZ	US	Certifications
The Sound of White	Released: 6 September 2004; Label: Eleven; Formats: CD, digital download	1	19	—	ARIA: 12× Platinum
On a Clear Night	Released: 28 April 2007; Label: Eleven; Formats: CD, digital download	1	14	193	ARIA: 4× Platinum
The Ol' Razzle Dazzle	Released: 1 June 2012; Label: Eleven; Formats: CD, digital download	1	24	83	ARIA: Platinum
Oz	Released: 19 September 2014; Label: Eleven; Formats: CD, LP, digital download	3	39	—	ARIA: Gold
Solastalgia	Released: 27 April 2018; Label: Eleven; Formats: CD, digital download, streaming	3	— (Note: Solastalgia did not enter the NZ Top 40 Albums Chart, but peaked at number six on the NZ Heatseeker Albums Chart.)	—	
The Second Act	Released: 6 September 2024; Label: Eleven; Formats: CD, LP, digital download, streaming	1	—	—	
"—" denotes a recording that did not chart or was not released in that territory.

=== Mini albums ===
Title	Album details	Peak chart positions
Title	Album details	AUS
Total Control	Released: 4 March 2022; Label: Eleven / EMI Music Australia (4531460); Formats: CD, digital download, streaming	3

=== Live albums ===
Title	Album details
Live & Acoustic (iTunes Exclusive)	Released: November 2005; Label: Warner Bros.; Formats: Digital download

=== Compilations ===
Title	Album details	Peak chart positions	Certifications
Title	Album details	AUS	Certifications
The EP Collectibles	Released: 16 August 2010; Label: Eleven: A Music Company; Format: Digital download	—	ARIA: Gold
The Special Ones	Released: 23 November 2018; Label: Eleven: A Music Company; Formats: Digital download, CD, Streaming	7	

=== Video albums ===
Title	Album details	Certifications
If You Tell Me Yours, I'll Tell You Mine	Released: 2005; Label: Eleven: A Music Company (ELEVENDVD43); Formats: DVD	ARIA: Platinum

== Extended plays ==
Title	Album details	Peak chart positions
Title	Album details	AUS
The Missy Higgins EP	Released: 3 November 2003; Label: Eleven: A Music Company (ELEVENCD18); Formats: CD, digital download	49
All for Believing (US only release)	Released: 24 January 2005; Label: Reprise Records, Warner Bros. (#48993); Formats: CD, digital download	—N/a

== Singles ==
=== As lead artist ===
Title	Year	Peak chart positions				Certifications	Album
Title	Year	AUS	NZ	UK	US Adult Pop	Certifications	Album
"Scar"	2004	1	20	—	34	ARIA: 5× Platinum; RMNZ: Gold	The Sound of White
"Ten Days"	2004	12	39	133	—	ARIA: Platinum	The Sound of White
"The Special Two"	2005	2	—	—	—	ARIA: 2× Platinum	The Sound of White
"The Sound of White"	2005	22	—	—	—	ARIA: Gold	The Sound of White
"Steer"	2007	1	—	—	—	ARIA: 2× Platinum	On a Clear Night
"Where I Stood"	2007	10	—	—	19	ARIA: Platinum; RIAA: Gold	On a Clear Night
"Peachy"	2007	—	—	—	—	ARIA: Gold	On a Clear Night
"More Than This" (US only)	2009	—N/a			—		Covered, A Revolution in Sound
"Unashamed Desire"	2012	58	—	—	—		The Ol' Razzle Dazzle
"Everyone's Waiting"	2012	11	—	—	—	ARIA: 2× Platinum	The Ol' Razzle Dazzle
"Hello Hello" (US only)	2012	—N/a			—		The Ol' Razzle Dazzle
"Set Me on Fire"	2012	—	—	—	—		The Ol' Razzle Dazzle
"We Ride"	2013	—	—	—	—		Spark: A Burning Man Story
"Shark Fin Blues"	2014	71	—	—	—		Oz
"Oh Canada"	2016	46	—	—	—		Non-album single
"Better Be Home Soon/Fall at Your Feet/Distant Sun (Medley)" (with Bernard Fanning and Crowded House)	2016	53	—	—	—		Non-album single
"Torchlight"	2017	— (Note: "Torchlight " did not enter the top 100 ARIA Singles Charts, but peaked at number 8 on the Australian Independent Label Singles chart.)	—	—	—		Non-album single
"Futon Couch"	2018	100	—	—	—	ARIA: Platinum	Solastalgia
"Cemetery"	2018	— (Note: "Cemetery" did not enter the top 100 ARIA Singles Charts, but peaked at number 49 on the ARIA Digital Tracks Chart. and number 4 on the Australian Independent Label Singles chart)	—	—	—		Solastalgia
"Arrows"	2018	— (Note: "Arrows" did not enter the top 100 ARIA Singles Charts, but peaked at number 1 on the Australian Independent Label Singles chart.)	—	—	—		The Special Ones
"Song for Sammy"	2019	— (Note: "Song for Sammy" did not enter the top 100 ARIA Singles Charts, but peaked at number 8 on the Australian Independent Label Singles chart.)	—	—	—		Non-album single
"Carry You"	2020	— (Note: "Carry You" did not enter the top 100 ARIA Singles Charts, but peaked at number 4 on the Australian Independent Label Singles chart.)	—	—	—		Upright (TV series)
"When the Machine Starts"	2020	— (Note: "When the Machine Starts" did not enter the top 100 ARIA Singles Charts, but peaked at number 6 on the Australian Independent Label Singles chart.)	—	—	—		Non-album single
"Edge of Something"	2021	— (Note: "Edge of Something" did not enter the top 100 ARIA Singles Charts, but peaked at number 6 on the Australian Independent Label Singles chart.)	—	—	—		Total Control
"Total Control"	2022	— (Note: "Total Control" did not enter the top 100 ARIA Singles Charts, but peaked at number 5 on the Australian Independent Label Singles chart.)	—	—	—		Total Control
"The Collector"	2022	—	—	—	—		Total Control
"Take It Back"	2022	—	—	—	—		Total Control
"Wide Open Road"	2023	— (Note: "Wide Open Road" did not enter the top 100 ARIA Singles Charts, but peaked at number 17 on the Australian Independent Label Singles chart following the release of the album.)	—	—	—		Mushroom: Fifty Years of Making Noise (Reimagined)
"You Should Run"	2024	— (Note: "You Should Run" did not enter the top 100 ARIA Singles Charts, but peaked at number 1 on the Australian Independent Label Singles chart.)	—	—	—		The Second Act
"The Second Act"	2024	— (Note: "The Second Act" did not enter the top 100 ARIA Singles Charts, but peaked at number 9 on the Australian Independent Label Singles chart.)	—	—	—		The Second Act
"A Complicated Truth"	2024	—	—	—	—		The Second Act
"Craters"	2024	—	—	—	—		The Second Act
"One of Your Girls" (Triple J Like a Version)	2024	—	—	—	—		Non-album single (Note: Later included on the 2025 compilation Triple J's Best Australian Like A Version)
"Won't Be Heavy" (Josh Pyke featuring Missy Higgins)	2026	—	—	—	—		Kingdom Within
"Under the Milky Way"	2026	—	—	—	—		Forever Young by War Child Australia
"—" denotes a recording that did not chart or was not released in that territory.

== Notes ==
=== As featured artist ===
Title	Year	Album
"Beds Are Burning" (Amanda Palmer featuring Missy Higgins, Brian Viglione and Jherek Bischoff)	2020	Forty-Five Degrees - A Bushfire Charity Flash Record
"Legacy Part 2" (Birdz featuring Missy Higgins)	2021	Legacy
"The Whole World Is Dreaming [Live]" (Mark Seymour and the Undertow featuring Missy Higgins)	2021	
"Have Yourself a Merry Little Christmas" (Ben Abraham featuring Missy Higgins)	2021	

== Other appearances ==
Year	Title	Artist	Album	Role
2005	"Stuff and Nonsense"	Various artists	She Will Have Her Way: The Songs of Tim & Neil Finn	Lead vocals
2005	"Ghost Songs" and "Paperboy"	Tim Rogers and the Temperance Union	Dirty Ron/Ghost Songs	Performer
2005	"Moses"	Triple J	Like a Version: Volume One	Lead vocals
2007	"Droving Woman"	Various artists	Cannot Buy My Soul	Vocals
2007	"Moses"	Various artists	Sounds Eclectic: The Covers Project	Lead vocals
2009	"(I'm) In Love Again"	Various artists	Best Is Yet to Come: The Songs of Cy Coleman	Lead vocals
2009	"More Than This" (Roxy Music cover)	Various artists	Covered, A Revolution in Sound	Lead vocals
2010	"Feel Like Going Back Home" (with Ernie Dingo)	Various artists	Bran Nue Dae	Lead vocals
2010	"Afterglow"	Various artists	Bran Nue Dae	Lead vocals
2011	"Simon Smith and the Amazing Dancing Bear"	Various artists	The Muppets – The Green Album	Lead vocals
2013	"This Morning" (with Matt Corby)	Various artists	Crucible - The Songs of Hunters & Collectors	Lead vocals
2013	"Stuff and Nonesence" (with Tim Finn)	Various artists	At Last – A Timeless Collection of Beautiful Songs	Lead vocals
2015	"Favours" (with Darren Middleton)	Darren Middleton	Splinters	Vocals
2015	"Hidden Ones"	Various artists	Say Yes to Love (Volume 2)	Lead vocals
2016	"Three Little Fishes"	Various artists	Famous Friends – 50 Years of Play School	Lead vocals
2020	"Carry You"	Various artists	Music from the Home Front	with Tim Minchin
2022	"Song for Sammy" (with Tasmanian Symphony Orchestra)	Tasmanian Symphony Orchestra	Hush: Nightlife	Vocals
