= The Special Ones =

Greatest hits album by Missy Higgins
- Released: 23 November 2018
- Recorded: 2000–2018
- Length: 78:47
- Label: Eleven: A Music Company

Missy Higgins chronology
Solastalgia (2018)	The Special Ones (2018)	Total Control (2022)

Singles from The Special Ones
- 1. "Arrows" Released: 19 October 2018

The Special Ones (subtitled The Best Of) is the first greatest hits album by Australian singer songwriter, Missy Higgins. The album includes tracks from Higgins' five studio albums as well as three new unreleased tracks and the previously unreleased demo of "All for Believing" she submitted to Triple J Unearthed competition in 2001. The Special Ones was released on 23 November 2018.

Upon release, Higgins explained The Special Ones saying "Usually, they're the ones that get the biggest reaction at gigs, the ones that most connect with people, the ones that seem to have touched on some universal truth. They're the hooky ones you can sing out loud in the shower while no one's watching and imagine you're in a stadium. But some are special for other reasons. They're the ones that unexpectedly squeeze at your heart. They move you in a way you find hard to articulate, they roll to the rhythm of some internal beat you knew was there but couldn't quite express. This album tries to balance these two types of special."

The album will be supported by the national Coming Home Tour, commencing in January 2019.

== Reception ==
Jeff Jenkins from Stack Magazine said "Missy Higgins' career hasn’t been long.. but her body of work, as exhibited on this first best-of, shows that she might be the finest female singer-songwriter Australia has produced."

== Track listing ==
No.	Title	Writer(s)	Album	Length
1.	"Arrows"	Missy Higgins	new recording	4:48
2.	"All for Believing" (Original Demo)	Higgins	non-album single	2:55
3.	"Scar"	Higgins; Kevin Griffin	The Sound of White	3:33
4.	"Ten Days"	Higgins; James Major Clifford	The Sound of White	3:46
5.	"The Special Two"	Higgins	The Sound of White	4:26
6.	"Steer"	Higgins	On a Clear Night	3:50
7.	"Where I Stood"	Higgins	On a Clear Night	4:17
8.	"Peachy"	Higgins	On a Clear Night	2:39
9.	"Unashamed Desire"	Higgins; Butterfly Boucher	The Ol' Razzle Dazzle	3:29
10.	"Everyone's Waiting"	Higgins; Dan Wilson	The Ol' Razzle Dazzle	3:49
11.	"Set Me on Fire"	Higgins; Boucher; Wilson	The Ol' Razzle Dazzle	3:36
12.	"Shark Fin Blues"	Gareth Liddiard; Rui Pereira	Oz	5:14
13.	"NYE"	Perry Keyes	Oz	3:55
14.	"Futon Couch"	Higgins; Pip Norman	Solastalgia	3:26
15.	"49 Candles"	Higgins; Daniel Parker	Solastalgia	3:16
16.	"Cemetery"	Higgins; Norman; Daniel Kyriakides; Steph Jones	Solastalgia	4:08
17.	"Oh Canada"	Higgins	non-album single	4:29
18.	"Throw Your Arms Around Me" (Live at ANZ Stadium, Sydney 2018)	John Archer; Geoffrey Crosby; Douglas Falconer; Jack Howard; Robert Miles; Mark Seymour; Michael Waters	new recording	5:42
19.	"Torchlight"	Higgins	non-album single	4:26
20.	"Run So Fast" (featuring Ben Abraham)	Higgins	new recording	3:03
Total length:				78:47

== Charts ==
=== Weekly charts ===
Chart (2018–19)	Peak position
Australian Albums (ARIA)	7

=== Year-end charts ===
Chart (2019)	Position
Australian Artist Albums (ARIA)	30

== Release history ==
Region	Date	Format	Edition(s)	Label	Catalogue
Australia	23 November 2018	CD; digital download; vinyl; streaming	Standard	Eleven: A Music Company	ELEVENCD146
