= The EP Collectibles =

Compilation album by Missy Higgins
- Released: 16 August 2010
- Recorded: 2003–2009
- Genre: Pop rock
- Label: Eleven, Reprise

Missy Higgins chronology
On a Clear Night (2007)	The EP Collectibles (2010)	The Ol' Razzle Dazzle (2012)

The EP Collectibles is a compilation of tracks that had previously appeared on Missy Higgins's EPs and singles between 2003 and 2009.The album was released worldwide, digitally in August 2010

== Track listing ==
1. "Greed for Your Love" (Live) - 4:03
2. "Scar" (Live) - 3:19
3. 'The Special Two" (Live) - 4:50
4. "Falling" - 4:18
5. "Greed for Your Love" - 4:07
6. "Ten Days" (Live) - 3:41
7. "This Is How It Goes" (Live) - 3:57
8. "The Battle" - 2:15
9. "Casualty" - 4:11
10. "Dancing Dirt Into the Snow" - 3:26
11. "The Cactus That Found the Beat" - 2:02
12. "Hold Me Tight" - 3:48
13. "Blind Winter" - 3:19
14. "Drop the Mirror" - 4:34
15. "You Just Like Me 'Cause I'm Good in Bed" - 2:44
16. "Don't Ever" (Live) - 2:51
17. "Dusty Road" - 3:11
18. "Stuff and Nonsense" - 3:29
19. "In Love Again" - 4:20
20. "Steer" (Triple J Acoustic Version) - 3:48
21. "Where I Stood" (Live from Cities) - 4:21
22. "Warm Whispers" (XM Session) - 5:06
23. "Forgive Me" (XM Session) - 4:12
24. "Peachy" (XM Session) - 2:36
25. "Secret" (XM Session) - 4:19
26. "Steer" (XM Session) - 3:54
27. "Breakdown" (Live with Brett Dennen & Mason Jennings) - 3:05
28. "More Than This" - 3:00
29. "100 Round the Bends" - 2:58
30. "All for Believing" (Live) - 2:52
31. "The Wrong Girl" (Live) - 3:29
32. "Angela (Live) - 3:17
33. "Sugarcane" (Live) - 3:35
34. "Going North" (Live) - 3:12

== Certifications ==
Certifications for The EP Collectibles
Region	Certification	Certified units/sales
Australia (ARIA)	Gold	35,000^{‡}
^{‡} Sales+streaming figures based on certification alone.
