= All for Believing =

EP by Missy Higgins
- Released: (United States) 25 January 2005
- Recorded: 2004
- Genre: Indie pop; soft rock
- Label: Eleven: A Music Company
- Producer: John Porter

Missy Higgins chronology
The Sound of White (2004)	All for Believing (2005)	On a Clear Night (2007)

All for Believing is the second extended play (EP) by Australian indie pop singer songwriter, Missy Higgins. It was released exclusively in the US in January 2005 as an introduction. Her debut studio album, The Sound of White was released in the US on 7 June 2005.

== Reception ==
Johnny Loftus from AllMusic gave the EP 3 out of 5 saying; "Designed as a calling card for her eventual domestic full-length, the brief set showcases Higgins' engaging vocal style and knack for balladry." adding "Higgins keeps "Believing" basic, heightening its dramatic sweep with subtle washes of cello and violin."

== Track listing ==
1. "All for Believing" - 3:30
2. "Ten Days" - 3:48
3. "Scar" - 3:36
4. "Nightminds" - 3:20
5. "Any Day Now" - 3:52

== Release history ==
Region	Date	Format(s)	Label	Catalogue
USA	25 January 2005	Compact Disc, Digital download	Reprise Records, Warner Bros.	48993-2
