= Alice Bell =

Australian screenwriter and director

Alice Bell is an Australian screenwriter and director. She has written for Australian TV dramas, including The Beautiful Lie, The Slap, Spirited, Rush and Puberty Blues. Most recently, Alice Bell collaborated with Nicole Kidman and Lulu Wang as writer and Executive Producer on Amazon Prime Video's Expats which was shot in Hong Kong over the pandemic, starring Nicole Kidman, Sarayu Blue, Ji-young Yoo, Brian Tee, Jack Huston and Ruby Ruiz. She has directed music videos for artists including Silverchair, Toni Collette and the Finish, Jimmy Barnes, Little Birdy, and Missy Higgins. In 2007, she won the ARIA Award for Best Video, with co-director Paul Goldman, for Silverchair's "Straight Lines".

== Early life ==
Bell grew up in the harbourside suburb of Balmain, Sydney. After a series of "terrible" jobs, including a stint as a dental nurse and role at an electroplating factory, she chose to forego formal training and began working in the film industry as production assistant. She made her way up to the role of production manager at Leah Churchill-Brown's company The Doll Collective.

== Career ==
In 2006, at age 27, Bell's first feature film, Suburban Mayhem, was invited to screen at the Cannes Film Festival. The film had its North American premiere at the Toronto International Film Festival before receiving an international release. The screenplay won Bell the AWGIE Award for Best Original Screenplay in 2012, but the film was a critical failure. On Rotten Tomatoes, it has a "rotten" rating of 20%, based on 5 reviews, with an average rating of 4/10. Bell had obsessively researched true crime to develop the story, and had attended murder trials to gain insight into crime within families. She completed the script in her early twenties.

Bell was one of the original writers on Channel Ten's police rescue drama Rush, with her first episode airing on 18 November 2008. She wrote episodes for series one to three.

In 2009, she completed a five-month intensive writers' workshop at the Binger Filmlab in Amsterdam. This led her to produce the screenplay Gin and Tonic, which as of 2015 was in its final stages of development.

Bell wrote the "Connie" episode of ABC's the award-winning series The Slap, an adaptation of Christos Tsiolkas' novel of the same name. The series' writing was called "quotidian and naturalistic" by The New York Times. Bell, along with her co-writers, won the 2012 AWGIE Award for Television Mini-Series (Adaptation). Bell received an AWGIE nomination the same year for Best Screenplay in a Television Series for her episode of Spirited, 'If You See Her Say Hello'. In 2013, she was nominated for an AACTA Award with co-writer Tony McNamara for episode five of the Ten Network's Puberty Blues. The show won the AACTA Award for Best Television Drama Series the same year.

Bell is the co-creator, script producer and co-writer of 2015's The Beautiful Lie which airs on ABC. She wrote four of the drama's six episodes.

== Personal life ==
Bell lives in Sydney with her husband - actor, writer and director Leon Ford – together they have two daughters, Francesca and Emilie, and a son, Willem, who was born in April 2017.

== Music videos ==
- Look Up - Toni Collette and the Finish (2006)
- Straight Lines - Silverchair (2007)
- Where I Stood - Missy Higgins (2007)
- After Dark - Little Birdy (2007)
- Out in the Blue - Jimmy Barnes (2008)
- Peachy - Missy Higgins
