= Acoustic Live =

Acoustic Live may refer to:

- Acoustic Live (Erasure album)
- Acoustic Live at the WOW, Floater 2008
- Acoustic Live in Newcastle, album by Sting 1991
- Acoustic: Live at Stubb's, album by Reckless Kelly
- Acoustic Live Radio Show (EP), by 30 Seconds to Mars
- Acoustic Live! (Adam Lambert EP)
- Acoustic Live, Five for Fighting EP
- Acoustic Live, Nils Lofgren 1997
- Acoustic Live from the Gibson Lounge, an EP by Rev Theory
- Southside Double-Wide: Acoustic Live, Sevendust

== See also ==
- Live Acoustic (disambiguation)
- Live and Acoustic (disambiguation)
