= O Canada (disambiguation) =

O Canada is the national anthem of Canada.

O Canada may also refer to:

- O Canada! (film), a film at the Canada pavilion of Epcot
- Oh, Canada (film), a 2024 film directed by Paul Schrader
- O Canada (TV series), an animated anthology series
- "Oh Canada" (Missy Higgins song) (2016)
- "O Canada! mon pays, mes amours", a patriotic song of 19th century
- O Canada (book), a 1965 history book by Edmund Wilson
- "Oh, Canada", a song by Five Iron Frenzy from the album Our Newest Album Ever! (1997)
- O Canada, Name of a Round the World Sailing Yacht
