= The Missy Higgins EP =

2003 EP by Missy Higgins

EP by Missy Higgins
- Released: 20 October 2003
- Studio: Mangrove (Central Coast); Triple J (Melbourne)
- Genre: Indie pop; synth-pop
- Label: Eleven: A Music Company
- Producer: Julian Hamilton; Missy Higgins

Missy Higgins chronology
The Missy Higgins EP (2003)	The Sound of White (2004)

Singles from The Missy Higgins EP
- 1. "Greed for Your Love" Released: 2003

The Missy Higgins EP is the debut extended play (EP) of Australian indie pop singer-songwriter Missy Higgins. It was recorded in the United States after Higgins had supported Australian bands the Waifs and george on their 2003 national tours. The EP was released in Australia on 20 October 2003 and took until August 2004 to peak at number 49 on the Australian Singles Chart, after her number-one single "Scar" had been released.

== Track listing ==
Australian CD EP

1. "Greed for Your Love" – 4:08
2. "Falling" – 4:18
3. "All for Believing" – 3:06
4. "The Special Two" – 4:23

== Chart performance ==
The Missy Higgins EP debuted at number 65 on the ARIA Singles Chart in October 2003 but did not reach its peak of number 49 until 9 August 2004—the same week her debut single, "Scar", topped the same chart.

=== Weekly charts ===
Chart (2004)	Peak position
Australia (ARIA)	49

== Release history ==
Region	Date	Format(s)	Label	Ref.
Australia	20 October 2003	CD	Eleven: A Music Company	
