= Unashamed Desire =

Single by Missy Higgins

from the album The Ol' Razzle Dazzle
- A-side: "Unashamed Desire"
- Released: 23 April 2012
- Genre: Alternative, pop
- Length: 3:31
- Label: Eleven
- Songwriters: Missy Higgins, Butterfly Boucher
- Producers: Brad Jones, Butterfly Boucher

Missy Higgins singles chronology
| "More Than This" (2009) | "Unashamed Desire" (2012) | "Everyone's Waiting" (2012) |

"Unashamed Desire" is the first single from Australian singer-songwriter Missy Higgins' third album, The Ol' Razzle Dazzle. The song made its worldwide premier on Triple J in April and the single was released digitally on 23 April 2012

"Unashamed Desire" follows Missy's private decision to quit music despite selling over a million copies of her first two albums, ‘The Sound of White’ and ‘On A Clear Night’, critical acclaim, multiple ARIA Awards and gold certification in the United States of America.

== Music ==
"Unashamed Desired" is in the key of Dm.

== Video ==
The video for "Unashamed Desire" received considerable media attention and saw Higgins dancing on stage with (and being lifted by) several male and female dancers as confetti rains down on her in a combination of music, theatre and art.

== Reviews ==
Sean Holio from Cool Try said; "Different, but yet familiar. Honest but with a hint of lyrical insincerity that displays Missy wanting you to know where she has been but without divulging too much."

Niko Batallones from Earthings reviewed the song, saying "after so long out of circulation (her last album was released five years ago) the Aussie singer-songwriter is back with a new style". "Although I’m a bit anxious that people will see her as a Gotye copycat, especially with the poppier sound and all the origami in her body".

Simone Ubaldi from Beat Music reviewed the song, saying: "Unashamed Desire is a big old plonker of a piano tune with some dark muttering in the verse and arch wailing in the chorus" and that is a "Nice, big sound".

Adrian Erdedi reviewed the song, simply saying: "Unashamed Desire is AMAZING".

== Track listing ==
1. "Unashamed Desire" (3.31)

== Charts ==
| Chart (2012) | Peak position |
|---|---|
| Australian ARIA Singles Chart | 58 |

== Release history ==
| Region | Date | Format(s) | Label |
|---|---|---|---|
| Australia | 23 April 2012 | Digital download | Eleven |
