= The Sound of White (song) =

2005 single by Missy Higgins

Single by Missy Higgins

from the album The Sound of White
- B-side: "Unbroken"; "Hold Me Tight"
- Released: 15 August 2005
- Length: 4:52
- Label: Eleven: A Music Company
- Songwriter: Missy Higgins
- Producer: John Porter

Missy Higgins singles chronology
"The Special Two" (2005)	"The Sound of White" (2005)	"Steer" (2007)

"The Sound of White" is the fourth and final single released from Australian singer-songwriter Missy Higgins' first album, The Sound of White (2004). It was released on 15 August 2005 and peaked at number 22 on the Australian ARIA Singles Chart.

== Track listing ==
Australian CD single

1. "The Sound of White" – 4:52
2. "Unbroken" – 3:42
3. "Hold Me Tight" – 3:49

== Charts ==
Chart (2005)	Peak position
Australia (ARIA)	22

== Certifications ==
Region	Certification	Certified units/sales
Australia (ARIA)	Gold	35,000^{‡}
^{‡} Sales+streaming figures based on certification alone.
