= The Second Act (album) =

Studio album by Missy Higgins
- Released: 6 September 2024
- Length: 47:26
- Label: Eleven
- Producers: Missy Higgins; Anna Laverty; Brendon Love

Missy Higgins chronology
Total Control (2022)	The Second Act (2024)

Singles from The Second Act
- 1. "You Should Run" Released: 23 February 2024; 2. "The Second Act" Released: 5 April 2024; 3. "A Complicated Truth" Released: 19 July 2024; 4. "Craters" Released: 6 September 2024

The Second Act is the sixth studio album by Australian singer-songwriter Missy Higgins. The album was released on 6 September 2024 through Eleven: A Music Company.

Upon announcement of the album in April 2024, Higgins called the album as "a kind of sequel" to her debut The Sound of White, released twenty years ago to the day. About the two albums, Higgins said "They're both looking forward nervously and wondering what comes next. They're both asking questions like 'who am I?' and 'who do I want to be?'". In September 2025 Higgins added "There aren't that many albums written from the perspective of parents, particularly single parents. [it captures] the kind of grief that comes with that, and the sense of responsibility and guilt."

The album was shorted listed for Best LP/EP at the 2025 Rolling Stone Australia Awards.

At the 2025 ARIA Music Awards, the album won Best Adult Contemporary Album and was nominated for Album of the Year, Best Solo Artist, while "Craters" was nominated for Best Video.

== Singles ==
"You Should Run" was released on 23 February 2024 as the album's lead single. Higgins described the song as "an intensely personal song". Mary Varvaris from The Music called the song "emotional" and "powerful" while Ali Hill from 91.7 called it "heart-breaking".

"The Second Act" was released on 5 April 2024 as the album's second single. The single reflects on life after a painful divorce. Higgins said the song is about "picking yourself up, dusting yourself off and heading out into the world."

"A Complicated Truth" was released on 19 July 2024 as the album's third single. The song sees Higgins explaining to her daughter the reasons she and her dad don't live together anymore.

"Craters" was released on 6 September 2024 alongside the full album as its fourth single. The song explores grief, its visibility to others and the lasting effects on life.

== Reception ==
Bryget Chrisfield from Beat Magazine described the album as "raw, emotional and soothing". The Australian called it Higgins' "rawest album to date – both with regards to its extremely personal subject matter, and its pared-back and primarily solo piano-based songs." Al Newstead from Double J called it "One of the most quietly profound, nuanced break-up albums you'll ever hear."

== Track listing ==
All tracks are written by Missy Higgins.

The Second Act track listing
No.	Title	Length
1.	"You Should Run"	3:54
2.	"A Complicated Truth"	5:05
3.	"When 4 Became 3"	4:18
4.	"Craters"	3:15
5.	"The In-Between"	4:26
6.	"The Second Act"	3:39
7.	"Don't Make Me Love You"	3:54
8.	"The Broken Ones"	4:16
9.	"Story for the Ages"	4:56
10.	"Hush Now"	4:53
11.	"Blue Velvet Dress"	4:50
Total length:		47:26

== Personnel ==
- Missy Higgins – vocals, production, engineering
- Brendon Love – production (tracks 1, 4–7, 9–11)
- Anna Laverty – production (tracks 2, 3, 8)
- Nao Anzai – mastering, mixing

== Charts ==
=== Weekly charts ===
Weekly chart performance for The Second Act
Chart (2024)	Peak position
Australian Albums (ARIA)	1

=== Year-end charts ===
2024 year-end chart performance for The Second Act
Chart (2024)	Position
Australian Artist Albums (ARIA)	14

== Release history ==
Release history and formats for The Second Act
Region	Date	Format(s)	Label	Catalogue	Reference
Australia	6 September 2024	CD, digital download	Eleven	6525128	
Australia	6 September 2024	Vinyl	Eleven	6525129	
