= Cemetery (Missy Higgins song) =

Single by Missy Higgins

from the album Solastalgia
- Released: 13 April 2018
- Genre: pop
- Length: 4:09
- Label: Eleven
- Songwriter(s): Missy Higgins Daniel Kyriakides, Pip Norman, Steph Jones
- Producer(s): Pip Norman

Missy Higgins singles chronology
"Futon Couch" (2018)	"Cemetery" (2018)	"Arrow" (2018)

"Cemetery" is a song performed by Australian singer-songwriter Missy Higgins. Higgins premiered "Cemetery" at "A Weekend in the Gardens" on 19 November 2017, and released on 13 April 2018 as the second and final single from her fifth studio album, Solastalgia. The song peaked at number 49 on the ARIA Digital Singles Chart.

Upon release, Higgins explained "I've just always been really adventurous and a bit of an explorer and for some reason I got into the habit of finding cemeteries and jumping the fence and going for a walk. There was something really peaceful about it because there was no one else in there with me apart from dead people." The song is combination of this habit with a tumultuous past relationship. Higgins said "It almost felt like we couldn't ever survive as a couple because it was too uncertain and dangerous and exciting and explosive. It was one of those things that kind of felt like you were playing with death while in that relationship."

== Video ==
The video for "Cemetery" was directed by Natasha Pincus and released on 26 April 2018.

== Reception ==
Kevin Humphreys from Alternative Press said "'Cemetery' is a full on pop tune with a big chorus that is perfect for any dance floor." Mushroom Records said "'Cemetery' is an infectious and uptempo single despite its downbeat title."

== Charts ==
Chart (2018)	Peak position
Australian Digital Tracks (ARIA)	49
