= Solastalgia (album) =

Studio album by Missy Higgins
- Released: 27 April 2018
- Genre: Pop
- Label: Eleven

Missy Higgins chronology
Oz (2014)	Solastalgia (2018)	The Special Ones (2018)

Singles from Solastalgia
- 1. "Futon Couch" Released: 8 February 2018; 2. "Cemetery" Released: 13 April 2018

Solastalgia is the fifth studio album by Australian singer-songwriter Missy Higgins, released on 27 April 2018. The album's title references an "existential distress caused by environmental change, such as mining or climate change".

The first single from the album, "Futon Couch", was released on 8 February 2018 with an accompanying video. The song has peaked at number 100 on the ARIA Singles Chart.

The album's second single "Cemetery" was released on 13 April 2018. The music video was released on 27 April 2018.

At the ARIA Music Awards of 2018, the album was nominated for the ARIA Award for Best Adult Contemporary Album.

== Reception ==
Professional ratings
Review scores
Source	Rating
The Australian	3.5/5 stars
The Music	4.5/5 stars
auspOp	4/5 stars

Sophie Benjamin from The Australian said "Solastalgia's best moments come from Higgins taking a long look at the world she's bringing her children into, wrestling with the guilt and fear from that decision, then going to her piano to work out her feelings about it." adding "The album's weakest moments are when Higgins mines her past for inspiration and gets carried away with the bells and whistles of laptop production." Benjamin concluded that "Old fans who loved her early work may be put off by the electronic production, but it's worth pushing through any discomfort and sitting with Solastalgia, an album that only underscores her talent."

Liz Giuffre from The Music said "Although there's quite a bit of thematic doom and gloom on this record, expect plenty of highs, too", adding "A departure into the electro fringe, this is Missy Higgins as far away from organic/acoustic pop as she has ever ventured, and it's well worth the journey." Giuffre named the track "49 Candles" as the bold standout.

David from auspOp gave the album 4 out of 5, saying "Overall [Higgins] has created a collection of songs which are interesting, dynamic and lyrically intriguing." He also called the album "magical".

== Track listing ==
No.	Title	Writer(s)	Length
1.	"Starting Again"	Missy Higgins, Pip Norman	4:17
2.	"Cemetery"	Higgins, Norman, Daniel Kyriakides, Steph Jones	4:09
3.	"Futon Couch"	Higgins, Norman	3:25
4.	"Red Moon"	Higgins, Alex Hope	3:29
5.	"How Was I to Know"	Higgins, Daniel Dodd Wilson	4:04
6.	"Yesterday Must Die"	Higgins, Butterfly Boucher, Cason Cooley	4:04
7.	"The Difference"	Higgins, Norman	4:07
8.	"Don't Look Down"	Higgins, Boucher, Cooley	4:12
9.	"Hallucinate"	Higgins, Hope	3:07
10.	"49 Candles"	Higgins, Daniel Parker	3:16
11.	"Strange Utopia"	Higgins, Norman, Joelma	4:33
12.	"The Old Star"	Higgins, Boucher	2:44

== Charts ==
Chart (2018)	Peak position
Australian Albums (ARIA)	3
New Zealand Heatseeker Albums (RMNZ)	6

== Release history ==
Region	Date	Format(s)	Label	Catalogue
Australia	27 April 2018	CD, download	Eleven	ELEVENCD140
Australia	27 April 2018	Vinyl	Eleven	ELEVENV140
