= On a Clear Night =

Studio album by Missy Higgins
- Released: 28 April 2007
- Recorded: Los Angeles, 2006
- Genres: Acoustic rock; indie pop; alternative
- Length: 37:52
- Label: Eleven
- Producer: Mitchell Froom

Missy Higgins chronology
All for Believing (2005)	On a Clear Night (2007)	The EP Collectibles (2010)

Singles from On a Clear Night
- 1. "Steer" Released: 14 April 2007; 2. "Where I Stood" Released: 4 August 2007; 3. "Peachy" Released: 10 November 2007

On a Clear Night is the second studio album by Australian singer-songwriter Missy Higgins, released by Eleven on 28 April 2007. Higgins started work on the album straight after finishing her 2004 debut, The Sound of White. She spent six months of 2006 in Broome, Western Australia, writing new material. She composed songs inspired by the landscape, and by past relationships. She wrote more material while touring the US and at the end of the year travelled to Los Angeles to record with Mitchell Froom.

The album was released on 28 April 2007 in Australia, with three singles; "Steer", "Where I Stood" and "Peachy". The album went to No. 1 on the Australian Recording Industry Association (ARIA) albums chart and was certified four times platinum. "Steer" topped the ARIA singles chart and "Where I Stood" went to No. 10. To help her break into the US market, Higgins' manager and Eleven's president John Watson endeavored to get her songs featured in US television shows. "Where I Stood" was used in shows including Smallville, Grey's Anatomy, One Tree Hill and So You Think You Can Dance.

On a Clear Night drew mixed reviews from critics both in Australia and abroad. More positive reviews compared Higgins to Sarah McLachlan and Alanis Morissette, and praised the album's maturity and assertiveness compared to The Sound of White. Less complimentary reviews said that On a Clear Night fails to lift Higgins above the level of her peers. Higgins was nominated for four awards at the 2007 ARIA Music Awards and won 'Best Female Artist'.

== Background and recording ==
Higgins started writing tracks for her second album as soon as she had finished recording The Sound of White, which was released in 2004. She said, "I started quite early because I knew there would a lot of pressure for the second album and I didn't want to write songs under anyone's stopwatch." "100 Round the Bends" was written while she was still recording the first album. During 2006, Higgins spent six months living in Broome, Western Australia, away from the distractions of the entertainment industry. Here she was able to relax and focus on creating new material for her next album. The landscape around Broome inspired the lyrics for "Going North". She said, "It was the first place I'd ever felt honestly connected with my country, with the physical land of my country". The lyrics for "Steer" were inspired when Higgins looked up at the night sky on a Broome beach: "It dawned on me how small we are, how short life is ... I felt so liberated to have finally figured that out."

Several of the songs on the album drew their lyrics from real life relationships. "Peachy" documents the permanent breakup of a relationship that had inspired her 2004 single "Ten Days". "Where I Stood", which Higgins calls "a pretty sad love song", describes the end of another relationship. She said it portrays "one of those situations where you just feel that leaving this person is something you have to do to get to know yourself again." "Secret" was about an ex-girlfriend who was uncomfortable about going public with their relationship; "I was so head over heels in love with her I kind of wanted to shout it out to the world, so it was just a song about keeping something under the covers ... keeping it away locked in a little room."

She left Broome to tour the United States, and continued to write material on the road. While much of her first album revolved around the piano, most of the songs from On a Clear Night were guitar-based. This was because Higgins had easier access to a guitar than keyboards while touring. She said, "I hadn't been playing guitar very long for the first album so I think I'm definitely a better guitar player, and probably a worse piano player because I haven't been able to play it much over the last few years".

In the second half of 2006, Higgins moved to Los Angeles to record On a Clear Night with American musician and producer Mitchell Froom, an experience Higgins described as "really easy and really fun." They spent three months recording in Froom's home studio with session musicians including Matt Chamberlain (drums), Davey Faragher (bass) and Greg Leisz (mandolin). Neil Finn of Crowded House played guitar on "Peachy" and sang backing vocals on "Going North".

== Release and promotion ==
On a Clear Night was released 28 April 2007 on Eleven. It debuted at No. 1 on the Australian Recording Industry Association (ARIA) albums chart and stayed on the chart for 39 weeks. It peaked at No. 14 on the Recording Industry Association of New Zealand (RIANZ) albums chart. The first single from the album was "Steer", released as an extended play (EP) on 14 April 2007. It debuted on the ARIA singles chart at No. 1 and stayed on the chart for 11 weeks. "Where I Stood" was released 4 August and entered the chart (and peaked) at No. 10. "Peachy" was released for digital download only on 10 November 2007. Higgins spent November and December promoting the album in Australia on her For One Night Only Tour, taking in Cairns, Sydney and Perth. She was joined on some dates by You Am I lead singer, Tim Rogers.

Eleven's president and Higgins' manager John Watson noted that her first album, The Sound of White had achieved limited success in North America. He said, "There's high name recognition there ... but not a high song recognition." To promote On a Clear Night, he sought placement of its songs in US films and television shows. "Where I Stood" featured in Grey's Anatomy, One Tree Hill, Brothers & Sisters, Lipstick Jungle, Smallville, The Hills, Men in Trees and So You Think You Can Dance. Higgins toured the US from July–October 2007 with her new material. The album was released in the US on 26 February 2008 on the Warner Bros. label. It reached No. 193 on the Billboard 200. Higgins then spent 10 months of 2008 in the US promoting the album and toured as a support act with the Indigo Girls and then Ben Folds.

== Reception ==
=== Critical ===
Professional ratings
Review scores
Source	Rating
Allmusic	4/5 stars

The album received mixed reviews in Australia. Writing for The Sydney Morning Herald, Bernard Zuel said that Higgins' second album was the chance to prove herself as a "special one", but that she had failed to do so. He called the album "attractive, in a comfortable way" and said that it would appeal to her fans, but said that Higgins is "no better or worse" than many other similar artists. Andrew Murfett for The Age was more positive and called the album "a convincing return". He cited "Secret" as a highlight and called the song "remarkably forthright". He also praised Froom's production.

In the US, reviews were also mixed but generally positive. Andrew Leahey of Allmusic said that On a Clear Night marks a development from The Sound of White and that the second album combines "sass with sweet sentiment" although at times is "a bit too calculated". He compared Higgins to Sarah McLachlan and Amy Winehouse, calling her "family friendly" but said that her popularity in Australia has not successfully spread to the US. A reviewer for Billboard noted that with this album, Higgins was trying to broaden her market and said that On a Clear Night would appeal to fans of KT Tunstall and the "Grey's Anatomy-soundtrack crowd". They said that "Steer" was a highlight and that Higgins sounded assured. Writing for Mix, Sarah Benzuly commented on Higgins' increased assertiveness with her second album and compared her to Sarah McLachlan and Alanis Morissette. She called the album lyrically rich and "beautifully stirring".

=== Awards ===
At the 2007 ARIA Music Awards Higgins was nominated for 'Best Pop Release', 'Highest Selling Album' and 'Best Female Artist' for On a Clear Night and 'Highest Selling Single' for "Steer". She won the award for 'Best Female Artist'. It was her seventh ARIA.

== Track listing ==
All songs were written by Missy Higgins.

1. "Where I Stood" – 4:17
2. "100 Round the Bends" – 2:58
3. "Steer" – 3:50
4. "Sugarcane" – 3:17
5. "Secret" – 4:07
6. "Warm Whispers" – 3:12
7. "The Wrong Girl" – 3:31
8. "Angela" – 3:03
9. "Peachy" – 2:39
10. "Going North" – 2:48
11. "Forgive Me" – 4:05

Limited Edition Tour DVD Edition

1. The Making Of "On A Clear Night" Documentary
2. "Steer" (Video)
3. "Where I Stood" (Video)
4. "Peachy" (Video)
5. "Steer" [Director's Cut] (Video)

== Personnel ==
Music

- Matt Chamberlain – percussion, drums
- Davey Faragher – electric bass
- Neil Finn – electric guitars, background vocals
- Mitchell Froom – keyboards
- Missy Higgins – acoustic guitar, piano, vocals, wurlitzer
- Greg Leisz – mandolin
- Val McCallum – acoustic guitar, electric guitar, banjo
- Ian Walker – acoustic bass

Production

- David Boucher – engineer, mixing
- Melissa Chenery – management
- Mitchell Froom – producer
- Bob Ludwig – mastering
- Andy Olyphant – A&R
- John Watson – management

Design

- Steve Baccon – photography

== Charts ==
=== Weekly chart ===
Chart (2007)	Peak position
Australian Albums (ARIA)	1
New Zealand Albums (RMNZ)	14
US Billboard 200	193

Chart (2009)	Peak position
US Billboard 200	193

=== Year-end charts ===
Chart (2007)	Position
Australian Charts	4

== Certifications ==
Region	Certification	Certified units/sales
Australia (ARIA)	4× Platinum	280,000^{‡}
^{‡} Sales+streaming figures based on certification alone.
