= Total Control (EP) =

EP by Missy Higgins
- Released: 4 March 2022
- Length: 21:49
- Label: Eleven: A Music Company; EMI Music Australia
- Producer: Missy Higgins; Brendan Love

Missy Higgins chronology
The Special Ones (2018)	Total Control (2022)	The Second Act (2024)

Singles from Total Control
- 1. "Edge of Something" Released: 15 October 2021; 2. "Total Control" Released: 3 February 2022; 3. "The Collector" Released: 4 March 2022; 4. "Take It Back" Released: 1 July 2022

Total Control is the first mini-album by Australian indie pop singer-songwriter Missy Higgins, released on 4 March 2022.

As per the press release, Total Control has "themes of exploitation and female empowerment" and its songs were inspired by musical fragments for certain scenes of ABC TV's political drama, Total Control.

The album was co-produced by Higgins's friend Brendon Love, one of the Teskey Brothers. Higgins called the mini-album "about taking control as a woman", "taking back what's yours", the "right to write your own story" and about "finding strength through your love for your family, and your connections to your history".

At the 2022 ARIA Music Awards, the release was nominated for Best Adult Contemporary Album.

== Track listing ==
Total Control track listing
No.	Title	Writer(s)	Length
1.	"Watch Out"	Missy Higgins; Anthony Partos; Matteo Zingales	2:57
2.	"The Collector"	Higgins; Partos; Zingales	2:52
3.	"Edge of Something"	Higgins; Partos; Zingales	3:33
4.	"Total Control"	Martha Davis; Jeff Jourard	5:35
5.	"Big Kids"	Higgins	3:46
6.	"Take It Back"	Higgins	3:06
Total length:			21:49

== Charts ==
Chart performance for Total Control
Chart (2022)	Peak position
Australian Albums (ARIA)	3
