= Oh Canada (Missy Higgins song) =

Single by Missy Higgins
- Released: 19 February 2016
- Length: 4:28
- Label: Eleven
- Songwriter: Missy Higgins

Missy Higgins singles chronology
"Shark Fin Blues" (2015)	"Oh Canada" (2016)	"Better Be Home Soon/Fall at Your Feet/Distant Sun" (2020)

"Oh Canada" is a song by Australian singer-songwriter Missy Higgins, and inspired by Alan Kurdi—a drowned Syrian boy whose body washed up on a Turkish beach in September 2015. The track was released on 19 February 2016 with 100% of net profits from the song to the Asylum Seeker Resource Centre.

It was shortlisted for Song of the Year at the APRA Music Awards of 2017.

== Background ==
"Oh Canada" tells the story of the three-year-old boy who was found dead in September 2015 after fleeing Syria for Canada, with his brother and their parents. Alan's father Abdullah was the only survivor. "Their ultimate goal was to get to Canada because his sister lived over there," Higgins said, "Their application had been rejected, so they thought getting a boat was their only choice"

Higgins explained to The Guardian her emotional reaction—including anger—to seeing the photo of Kurdi from her living room. She said she wanted to write about it. "I tried not to take the moral high ground or point the finger at anyone, but rather tell the story as it happened. That [story] in itself, I think, is powerful and devastating enough."

While Canada is mentioned in the lyrics, she uses the country as a way to draw light on the way other countries deal with refugees, including Australia. Higgins says; "It's not preaching anything, in particular, it's simply my attempt to make sense out of senselessness."

The lyrics of the song allude to the family's dreams of a new life in Canada, sung through Kurdi's father's perspective, which were spoiled when Kurdi, along with his mother and older brother, drowned while trying to make the journey from Turkey to Greece. "Oh Canada, if you can hear me now, won't you open up your arms to the sea? / Oh Canada, if you can help me out, all I ever wanted was a safe place for my family."

== Music video ==
The music video was created by animation director Nicholas Kallincos and Natasha Pincus. It was produced by stark raving productions and features drawings by children affected by the crisis in the Middle East, accompanied by picture-book-like animation narrating the story of the Kurdi family.

Pincus said, "I first heard the song as an iPhone-recorded demo that Missy sent me. I was driving while I listened to it and had to pull over. I literally broke down in tears. The video concept needed to bring the song and Alan's story to life sensitively, boldly, but also without overwhelming either of them." Pincus said she spent weeks planning the clip, "But when I discovered drawings online that had been made by refugee children as part of rehabilitation programs around the world, I knew I had stumbled on the concept I needed to focus on."

The music video was published on YouTube on 18 February 2016.

== Charts ==
Chart (2016)	Peak position
Australia (ARIA)	46
