= Ben Abraham (musician) =

Australian singer and songwriter (born 1985)

- Born: May 12, 1985 (age 41); Melbourne, Victoria, Australia
- Genres: Folk; indie
- Years active: 2014–present
- Labels: Inertia Recordings, Atlantic Records, Secretly Canadian
- Website: benabrahammusic.com

Ben Abraham (born 12 May 1985) is an Australian folk singer and songwriter from Melbourne. Ben collaborated with artists including Kesha and Sara Bareilles. He co-wrote "Praying" by Kesha.

== Career ==
Abraham's parents were both musicians who played together in the Indonesian pop group Pahama. His sister is Michaela Jayde, who appeared in 2023 on the twelfth season of The Voice and received a four-chair-turn in her audition. Abraham initially sought to become a screenwriter, and concurrently began songwriting while working in a hospital.

In 2014, he released his debut album, Sirens in Australia, which he described as "basically a roadmap of my awkward naïve insecure 20s". In March 2016, the album was reissued by Secretly Canadian. The album includes the track "This Is On Me", which features American vocalist Sara Bareilles, as well as appearances by fellow Australian Gotye.

In 2016 and 2017, Abraham also co-wrote with artists Wafia, Ta-ku and Wrabel on their respective singles "Heartburn", "Meet in the Middle", and "Bloodstain." Abraham's voice has been compared to Guy Garvey and Peter Gabriel. CMJ's Eric Davidson calls Abraham's voice "delicate yet booming" and Sirens a "strong, electro-soul" record.

At the APRA Music Awards of 2018, he won the Overseas Recognition Award and was nominated for Breakthrough Songwriter of the Year.

In September 2021, Abraham announced the release of his forthcoming second studio album. On 1 October, the album's fifth single "I Am Here" was released, which is set to appear in the season premiere of ABC's Grey's Anatomy.

He came out as queer in 2022.

In 2023, Abraham was dropped by Atlantic Records. This led to Abraham embracing the freedoms that come with being Independent.

== Discography ==
=== Albums ===
List of albums, with selected details
Title	Album details
Sirens	Released: November 2014; Label: Inertia Recordings (IR5240CD); Format: CD, digital
Friendly Fire	Scheduled: 11 March 2022; Label: Atlantic Records (075678648762); Format: CD, digital

=== Singles ===
List of singles, with Australian chart positions
Title	Year	Peak chart positions	Album
Title	Year	AUS	Album
"Speak"	2014	-	Sirens
"Home"	2015	-	Sirens
"In My Head" (Sak Pase featuring Ben Abraham)	2017	-	—N/a
"dear insecurity" (gnash featuring Ben Abraham)	2018	-	We
"Satellite"	2019	-	—N/a
"Nobody Wants To Hear Songs Anymore"	2019	-	—N/a
"In Your Eyes"	2020	-	—N/a
"Like a Circle"	2021	-	Friendly Fire
"War in Your Arms"	2021	-	Friendly Fire
"Requiem"	2021	-	Friendly Fire
"Runaway"	2021	-	Friendly Fire
"I Am Here"	2021	-	Friendly Fire
"If I Didn't Love You"	2022	-	Friendly Fire
"Another Falling Star"	2022	-	Friendly Fire
"Never Been Better"	2023	-	TBA
“Kidung”	2024	-	-
“I Don’t Want To Wait”	2024	-	-
“Never Been Better Remix”	2024	-	-
“War In Your Arms (Indonesian Version)”	2024	-	-

== Other appearances ==
List of other non-single song appearances
Title	Year	Album
"Wasn't It Good" (Ainslie Wills and Ben Abraham)	2017	Greatest Hits & Interpretations
"Run So Fast" (Missy Higgins featuring Ben Abraham)	2018	The Special Ones
"Eat Your Food"	2020	At Home with the Kids
“Sometimes (with Ben Abraham) (Trousdale featuring Ben Abraham)	2024	Out of My Mind (Deluxe)

== Awards and nominations ==
=== APRA Awards ===
The APRA Awards are held in Australia and New Zealand by the Australasian Performing Right Association to recognise songwriting skills, sales and airplay performance by its members annually.

Year	Nominee / work	Award	Result	Ref.
2018	Ben Abraham	Breakthrough Songwriter of the Year	Nominated	
2018	Ben Abraham	Overseas Recognition Award	Won	

=== Berlin Music Video Awards ===
The Berlin Music Video Awards is an international festival that promoted the art of music videos.

Year	Nominee / work	Award	Result	Ref.
2023	If I Didn t Love You	Best Narrative	Nominated	
