= Carry You (Missy Higgins song) =

Single by Missy Higgins
- Released: 24 January 2020
- Studio: Free Energy Device Studios, Sydney & Richard Stolz at Woodstock Studios, Melbourne
- Length: 3:14
- Label: Eleven
- Songwriter(s): Tim Minchin
- Producer(s): Sarah Belkner and Richie Belkner

Missy Higgins singles chronology
"Song for Sammy" (2019)	"Carry You" (2020)	"When the Machine Starts" (2020)

"Carry You" is a song performed by Australian singer-songwriter Missy Higgins and written by Tim Minchin, released on 24 January 2020. The song was recorded and used in the credits of the final episode of Australian drama, Upright.

Speaking about the song, Minchin said "I've adored Missy's voice for so long, the fact that she agreed to sing this song, which means so much to me, is an incredible thrill." Higgins said "I hadn't seen Upright before Tim asked me if I wanted to record a song for it, but I was a big fan of Tim's work so I knew it would be good. When he played me 'Carry You' on the piano I instantly felt how beautiful and universal it was and how I might make it my own. When I sang it in the studio, I felt the ache of regret and the longing for connection through the lyrics, which is something any of us can relate to I think."

In April 2020, Higgins and Minchin performed the song for the Music from the Home Front concert held across Australia and New Zealand.

In mid-2020, the song was adopted by The Fred Hollows Foundation for its campaign. The Foundation's director of brand and communications, Alison Hill, said the song was a perfect fit for the new campaign "'Carry You' is an emotive and unashamedly Australian song and so is the work and history of The Fred Hollows Foundation... The song is about holding someone in your heart. We hold in our hearts every patient we've restored sight to and there are many more who need our help. We hope this campaign will help us achieve that."

The song was nominated for Best Original Song Composed for Screen at the 2020 Screen Music Awards.

The song was nominated for Song of the Year at the APRA Music Awards of 2021

== Video ==
The video for "Carry You" was directed by Josef Gatti and released on 23 January 2020.

== Reception ==
Augustus Welby from Tone Deaf said "'Carry You' is a sophisticated ballad led by Higgins' unmistakable Aussie twang. Belkner's lean, spacious production complements the song's emotional pull."

== Personnel ==
- Vocals – Missy Higgins
- Piano/Rhodes/Synths – Sarah Belkner
- Drums – Evan Mannell
- Flugelhorn – Dane Laboyrie
