= Live Acoustic =

Live Acoustic may refer to:

- Live Acoustic (Sarah McLachlan EP)
- Live Acoustic (VersaEmerge EP)
- Live Acoustic (Avril Lavigne EP)
- Live Acoustic (The Auteurs EP)
- Live Acoustic (Dua Lipa EP)

== See also ==
- Live and Acoustic (disambiguation)
