= Live and Acoustic =

Live and Acoustic or Live & Acoustic may refer to:

- Live and Acoustic (Rivermaya album)
- Live and Acoustic (Ray Wilson album)
- Live and Acoustic (EP), a 1994 EP by Harem Scarem
- Live & Acoustic (Latch Key Kid album), 2009
- Live & Acoustic (Missy Higgins album), 2005
- Live & Acoustic (Sarah McLeod album), 2006
- Live & Acoustic (Vika and Linda album), 2000

== See also ==
- Live Acoustic (disambiguation)
