= Peachy =

Single by Missy Higgins

from the album On a Clear Night
- A-side: "Droving Woman"; "The Book Song (Live)"; "100 Round The Bends (Live)"; "Don't Ever (Live)"
- Released: 10 November 2007
- Recorded: Los Angeles, California, 2006
- Genre: pop
- Length: 2:39
- Label: Eleven
- Songwriter: Missy Higgins
- Producer: Mitchell Froom

Missy Higgins singles chronology
"Where I Stood" (2007)	"Peachy" (2007)	"More Than This" (2009)

"Peachy" is a song by Australian singer-songwriter Missy Higgins and the third single released from her second album, On A Clear Night. The track features a guest appearance by Neil Finn playing electric guitar. The single was released on 10 November 2007, as a digital download only. At the ARIA Music Awards of 2008 Higgins was nominated for Best Female Artist for this single.

== Background ==
In 2004, Higgins released the song "Ten Days" which documented her feelings following a break-up with her boyfriend before she travelled to Europe after leaving high school. Though they later reconciled, the relationship ended and subsequently inspired the lyrics for "Peachy". The song was written in half an hour at a friend's house where Higgins locked herself in a room with a guitar. She said of the song, "[i]t's all those mind games you play with someone you've just broken up with [...] They're pretending they've moved on; you're pretending you have, too, but neither of you has. It's ridiculous."

The song was recorded in 2006 in Los Angeles at producer Mitchell Froom's home studio. The music video was directed and shot by Australian filmmakers Paul Goodman and Alice Bell.

== Release ==
"Peachy" was released for digital download only on 10 November 2007. "Peachy" was voted the number 51 song in the Triple J Hottest 100, 2007 and was included on the 2008 compilation CD Triple J's Hottest 100 Volume 15.

== Track listing ==
1. "Peachy" – 2:41
2. "Droving Woman" (performed by Augie March, Missy Higgins & Paul Kelly) – 8:45
3. "The Book Song" (Live) – 2:14
4. "100 Round the Bends" (Live) – 3:06
5. "Don't Ever" (Live) – 3:03

== Certifications ==
Region	Certification	Certified units/sales
Australia (ARIA)	Gold	35,000^{‡}
^{‡} Sales+streaming figures based on certification alone.
