= Better Be Home Soon/Fall at Your Feet/Distant Sun (Medley) =

Single by Missy Higgins, Bernard Fanning, Crowded House
- Released: 24 November 2016
- Recorded: November 2016
- Label: Liberation Music

Missy Higgins singles chronology
| "Oh Canada" (2016) | "Better Be Home Soon/Fall at Your Feet/Distant Sun (Medley)" (2016) | "Torchlight" (2017) |

Bernard Fanning singles chronology
| "Reckless" (2016) | "Better Be Home Soon/Fall at Your Feet/Distant Sun" (2016) | "Isn't It a Pity" (2017) |

"Better Be Home Soon" / "Fall at Your Feet" / "Distant Sun" is a medley of Crowded House songs performed by Australian recording artists Missy Higgins, Bernard Fanning, and Crowded House. The three acts performed the tracks as a tribute to Crowded House, which were inducted into the ARIA Hall of Fame at the ARIA Music Awards of 2016.

The medley has the songs "Better Be Home Soon" (which peaked at No. 2 in July 1988) by Fanning, "Fall at Your Feet" (No. 31 in September 1991) by Higgins, and "Distant Sun" (No. 23 in October 1992) by Crowded House. The medley itself peaked at No. 53 on the ARIA Singles Chart in December 2016.

== Background and release ==
On 23 November 2016, Crowded House were inducted into the ARIA Hall of Fame after 30 years in the industry. New Zealand stars Bret McKenzie and Jemaine Clement presented the award. After their acceptance speech, Missy Higgins, Bernard Fanning, and Crowded House launched into the medley.

The medley was well received, with Music Feeds saying, "A dream team of Aussie all-stars united to toast icons Crowded House with a musical tribute following their ARIA Hall of Fame induction. After a spine-tingling rendition of iconic gem 'Fall at Your Feet' from Missy Higgins bleeding into a tear-jerking performance of 'Better Be Home Soon' by Bernard Fanning, Crowded House themselves brought it all home with a show-stopping performance of their 1993 hit 'Distant Sun'. (There was) not a dry eye in the house."

The single was released the following day on iTunes.

== Track listing ==
- Digital download
1. "Better Be Home Soon / Fall at Your Feet / Distant Sun"

== Weekly charts ==
| Chart (2016) | Peak position |
|---|---|
| ARIA Singles Chart | 53 |
| ARIA Digital Singles Chart | 19 |
| ARIA Artists Singles Chart | 10 |
