= Futon Couch (song) =

Single by Missy Higgins

from the album Solastalgia
- Released: 8 February 2018
- Genre: pop
- Length: 3:25
- Label: Eleven
- Songwriters: Missy Higgins, Pip Norman

Missy Higgins singles chronology
"Torchlight" (2017)	"Futon Couch" (2018)	"Cemetery" (2018)

"Futon Couch" is a song performed by Australian singer-songwriter Missy Higgins, released in February 2018 as the lead single from her fifth studio album, Solastalgia.

Upon release, Higgins said: "This is the happiest song on the record. It is the story of me meeting my husband in Broome. He was my good friend’s house mate and one day he walked into the living room, wearing nothing but a towel, where I was waiting for my friend. I sat on the futon couch making small-talk with him while he did the dishes and I thought: 'where did THIS guy come from and why is he so lovely and how can I surreptitiously arrange to hang out with him more?' After that day, I popped round for tea at my friend’s house way more often. We fell in love. We sang 'I Was Made for Lovin' You' together at our friend's wedding the following week and a few years later, I walked down the aisle towards him. This single tracks the beginning of our relationship and follows it into an unknown future."

The song peaked at number 100 on the ARIA Singles Chart.

== Video ==
The video for "Futon Couch" was directed by Josh Harris and released on 28 February 2018.

== Reception ==
Thomas Bleach said: "'Futon Couch' is quite different to anything she has released in the past and hears her heading towards a heavier pop focus. With her alternative roots still holding on she transforms her sound with a slick indie-pop polish that will have you wanting to spin around, dance and maybe even run through a field. [...] The production is all euphoric which fittingly ties into the story while her vocals have never sounded so positive and bright before."

== Charts ==
Chart (2018)	Peak position
Australia (ARIA)	100

== Certifications ==
Region	Certification	Certified units/sales
Australia (ARIA)	Platinum	70,000^{‡}
^{‡} Sales+streaming figures based on certification alone.
