= Live Acoustic (Sarah McLachlan EP) =

EP by Sarah McLachlan
- Released: 31 May 2004
- Recorded: 2003
- Genre: Pop rock
- Length: 20:44
- Producer: Skip Kelly

Live Acoustic (Nettwerk) is an EP by Sarah McLachlan. It was released on 31 May 2004 in Canada only. Four of the tracks were recorded live at a "Live from the Lounge" event with Ryan Seacrest for radio station Star 98.7 on 7 October 2003. These tracks were produced by Skip Kelly and remastered by Dave Kutch. The recording of "Adia" was done at the debut of iTunes for the PC on 21 October 2003. The EP was previously only available on iTunes. The tracks "Angel", "Building a Mystery", and "Adia" are from her previous album Surfacing (1997). "Fallen" and "Answer" are from Afterglow (2003).

== Track listing ==
1. "Fallen" – 3:46 (McLachlan)
2. "Adia" – 4:01 (McLachlan / Marchand)
3. "Angel" – 5:13 (McLachlan)
4. "Building a Mystery" – 4:01 (McLachlan / Marchand)
5. "Answer" – 3:43 (McLachlan)

== Charts ==
Chart (2004)	Peak position
Canadian Albums (Billboard)	23
