= The Ol' Razzle Dazzle =

Studio album by Missy Higgins
- Released: 1 June 2012
- Recorded: 2011–2012
- Genre: Pop
- Length: 42:48
- Label: Eleven; Warner Bros./Reprise
- Producer: Brad Jones, Butterfly Boucher

Missy Higgins chronology
The EP Collectibles (2010)	The Ol' Razzle Dazzle (2012)	Oz (2014)

Singles from The Ol' Razzle Dazzle
- 1. "Unashamed Desire" Released: 23 April 2012; 2. "Everyone's Waiting" Released: 19 July 2012; 3. "Hello Hello" Released: July 2012; 4. "Set Me On Fire" Released: September 2012

The Ol' Razzle Dazzle is the third studio album by Australian singer-songwriter Missy Higgins, and was released by Eleven on 1 June 2012. Higgins began work on the album after a quiet retreat from the industry to refocus her life on other pursuits, including attending university and living in a share house. After playing Lilith Fair in the summer of 2010, Higgins decided to come back to music and worked with fellow singer/songwriter Butterfly Boucher, who helped co-produce The Ol' Razzle Dazzle with Nashville producer/engineer Brad Jones. The album was made available for pre-order on 26 April 2012.

The first single from the album, "Unashamed Desire", was released on 23 April 2012 with an accompanying video.

== Reception ==
Professional ratings
Review scores
Source	Rating
AllMusic	3.5/5 stars
The AU Review	9/10 stars
Cooltry	4/5 stars
Herald Sun	3.5/5 stars

Cameron Adams from Herald Sun said "Songs written about writing songs aren't uncommon... Missy Higgins has now added to that lesser-known genre: songs written about being unable to write songs." adding "Higgins hasn't lost her way with words."

Sean Holio from Cooltry said "The eclectic and diverse album keeps the listener constantly tuned in from the opening notes of "Set Me On Fire" to the closing and calming "Sweet Arms of a Tune". Both, coincidentally, are the closest to sounding like Missy Higgins. Everything in between takes the listener on an eclectic journey that not only showcases Missy's ability to create and piece together a striking pop song but also displays her growth as an artist and a musician."

Tyler McLoughlan from The Music AU said "Missy Higgins' much-lauded comeback record is as transparent as her recent media interviews explaining how a troubled relationship with music and fame led to her five-year absence."

Emmica Schlobohm from The AU Review said "This album is about a life of music and the relationship that Higgins has with her art form." adding "it was refreshing to listen to the complex, mature songs featured on The Ol' Razzle Dazzle. Some people will probably be surprised and unsure about whether the new Higgins hits the spot but I'm a firm believer in an artists' right to grow and change."

Alice Juster from Music Feeds said "The Ol' Razzle Dazzle is experimental, and far from the stripped-back acoustics we are used to from Higgins. The album brings a divine mixture of country, pop and soulful blues. The unmistakeable heart-aching personal touch that Higgins adds to every one of her songs is still ever so strong." adding "The album incorporates heavy-hearted soul with Missy’s unforgettable voice, and what it presents is dazzling."

Emily Young LOTL from called the album a "breath of fresh air that fans had been clamoring for after her brief departure from the music scene."

== Track listing ==
No.	Title	Writer(s)	Length
1.	"Set Me on Fire"	Missy Higgins, Butterfly Boucher, Dan Wilson	3:35
2.	"Hello Hello"	Higgins, Kevin Griffin	3:00
3.	"Unashamed Desire"	Higgins, Boucher	3:31
4.	"Everyone's Waiting"	Higgins, Wilson	3:52
5.	"All in My Head"	Higgins, Boucher	3:44
6.	"Temporary Love"	Higgins	3:40
7.	"Watering Hole"	Higgins, Amiel Courtin-Wilson	2:42
8.	"Tricks"	Higgins, Katie Herzig	3:07
9.	"If I'm Honest"	Higgins	3:32
10.	"Cooling of the Embers"	Higgins	3:59
11.	"Hidden Ones"	Higgins	4:22
12.	"Sweet Arms of a Tune"	Higgins	3:40
13.	"World Gone Mad" (iTunes bonus track)	Higgins	4:02
14.	"Link in a Chain" (iTunes exclusive pre-order bonus track)	Higgins	3:54

== Charts ==
The album debuted at number 1 on the ARIA Albums Chart the week of 12 June 2012, becoming Higgins' third straight number-one album.

=== Weekly charts ===
Chart (2012)	Peak position
Australian Albums (ARIA)	1
New Zealand Albums (RMNZ)	22
US Billboard 200	83
US Independent Albums (Billboard)	18
US Top Rock Albums (Billboard)	30

=== Year-end charts ===
Chart (2012)	Position
Australian Albums (ARIA)	22

== Certifications ==
Region	Certification	Certified units/sales
Australia (ARIA)	Platinum	70,000^{^}
^{^} Shipments figures based on certification alone.
