= Steer (song) =

2007 single by Missy Higgins

Single by Missy Higgins

from the album On a Clear Night
- B-side: "Dusty Road"; "The Battle"; "Leave a Note"
- Released: 14 April 2007
- Studio: Los Angeles, California
- Length: 3:53
- Label: Eleven
- Songwriter: Missy Higgins
- Producer: Mitchell Froom

Missy Higgins singles chronology
"The Sound of White" (2005)	"Steer" (2007)	"Where I Stood" (2007)

"Steer" is the first single from Australian singer-songwriter Missy Higgins' second album, On a Clear Night (2007). The song was released in Australia on 14 April 2007 and became the most-added track that same week. Higgins stated that the song is "about steers" and that she wrote it after overlooking the southern celestial hemisphere from a bay in Western Australia. The song has instrument backings of acoustic guitar and drums.

The single reached the number-one spot on the Australian Singles Chart in the first week of its release, dethroning Avril Lavigne's "Girlfriend" for a single week. It became Higgins' second number-one single, after 2004's "Scar". At the end of 2007, the song appeared at number 60 on the Australian year-end chart.

== Track listing ==
1. "Steer" – 3:53
2. "Dusty Road" – 3:14
3. "The Battle" – 2:17
4. "Leave a Note" (demo) – 3:43

== Charts ==
=== Weekly charts ===
Chart (2007)	Peak position
Australia (ARIA)	1

=== Year-end charts ===
Chart (2007)	Position
Australia (ARIA)	60

== Certifications ==
Region	Certification	Certified units/sales
Australia (ARIA)	2× Platinum	140,000^{‡}
^{‡} Sales+streaming figures based on certification alone.

== Release history ==
Region	Date	Format(s)	Label	Ref.
Australia	14 April 2007	CD single	Virgin	
United States	14 July 2008	Adult alternative radio	Reprise	
United States	27 April 2009	Hot adult contemporary radio	Reprise	
United States	27 April 2009	Digital download (Steer & More EP)	Reprise	
