= Torchlight (song) =

Single by Missy Higgins
- Released: 5 May 2017
- Length: 4:28
- Label: Missy Higgins Productions; Eleven
- Songwriter: Missy Higgins

Missy Higgins singles chronology
"Better Be Home Soon/Fall at Your Feet/Distant Sun" (2016)	"Torchlight" (2017)	"Futon Couch" (2018)

"Torchlight" is a song by Australian singer-songwriter Missy Higgins, written for the Australian film Don't Tell, a true story about a young girl seeking justice against the church. In the ballad, Higgins sings of the issues explored in the film: "Sometimes evil is a quiet town where nobody wants to hear your truth / and nobody wants to believe you."

The track was released on 5 May 2017.

In November, the song won an APRA Screen Music Award for Best Original Song Composed for Screen. This was Higgins' first APRA Screen Music Award. It is also the song played at the end of last episode of season 1 in the Australian television series Janet King.

== Background ==
Higgins read the script for the film Don't Tell, which she described to news.com.au as a "powerful experience". "It's such an emotional, inspiring story that when it came time to write the song, it came really easily. It's simply a beautiful film and the performances are just outstanding."

On 1 May 2017, Higgins announced the release of the single, saying: "I really felt like I'd seen something special when I walked out of the preview the other day. I cried many, many tears (and it's not often I cry during my own songs!) so please go and see it when it comes out. I feel incredibly honoured to have been a part of it."

== Music video ==
The music video was filmed in the Empire Theatre, Toowoomba and was directed by film director Tori Garret. The music video sees Higgins playing on a piano with excerpts of the film interspersed. The clip was published on YouTube on 1 May 2017.
