= Everyone's Waiting (song) =

Single by Missy Higgins

from the album The Ol' Razzle Dazzle
- A-side: "Everyone's Waiting"
- Released: 19 July 2012
- Genre: pop
- Length: 3:31
- Label: Eleven
- Songwriters: Dan Wilson, Missy Higgins
- Producers: Brad Jones, Butterfly Boucher

Missy Higgins singles chronology
"Unashamed Desire" (2012)	"Everyone's Waiting" (2012)	"Hello Hello" (2012)

"Everyone's Waiting" is the second single from Australian singer-songwriter Missy Higgins' third album, The Ol' Razzle Dazzle. It was the most commercially successful single from the album, peaking at No. 11 on the Australian ARIA Chart and was certified platinum. Higgins performed the song at the 2012 ARIA Awards, where the single won the award for "Best Video"

Missy said; "The song deals with a real inner conflict I went through regarding music, so to personify the water as both my nemesis and then my saviour is pretty spot on when relating to the meaning of the song. I feel honoured to have worked with such an incredible film-maker."

== Video ==
The video for "Everyone's Waiting" was filmed in Byron Bay and directed by Natasha Pincus At the ARIA Music Awards of 2012, it won Best Video.

== Review ==
Nick Bassett from Chart Shaker reviewed the song saying: "'Everyone's Waiting' serves up yet another stunning vocal from the singer and the lyrics deliver what could be interpreted as a devastatingly personal summation [as to] why she chose to take that break following a well-documented struggle to express herself after two massively successful albums."

Simone Ubaldi from Beat Music reviewed the song, saying: "...it's actually quite a lovely song. It's affecting, it's genuine, has a simple melody and a warm arrangement. But if you stop and think about it, the song is a very sweet exercise in self-pity, and that, from Missy Higgins, is unbearable.

Sean Holio from Cooltry said the song is "melodically charming".

== Charts ==
=== Weekly charts ===
Chart (2012)	Peak position
Australia (ARIA)	11

=== End of Year Charts ===
End of Year Chart (2012)	Peak position
Australian Artists (ARIA)	24

== Certifications ==
Region	Certification	Certified units/sales
Australia (ARIA)	2× Platinum	140,000^{‡}
^{‡} Sales+streaming figures based on certification alone.
