= The Special Two =

2005 single by Missy Higgins

Single by Missy Higgins

from the album The Sound of White
- B-side: "Drop the Mirror"; "Blind Winter"; "You Just Like Me Cause I'm Good in Bed"
- Released: 4 April 2005
- Length: 3:25
- Label: Eleven: A Music Company
- Songwriter: Missy Higgins
- Producer: Mitchell Froom

Missy Higgins singles chronology
"Ten Days" (2004)	"The Special Two" (2005)	"The Sound of White" (2005)

"The Special Two" is a song by Australian singer-songwriter Missy Higgins and the third single released from her debut album, The Sound of White. The song was also included on her 2003 debut EP, The Missy Higgins EP, although re-recorded for the studio album. Higgins said of the lyrics, "Basically I made a big mistake [...] I fell into a lump of depression, locking myself out the back in the bungalow. After a couple of days I came up with the song. I played it to that person and it was therapeutic. It was a good sorry letter." In June 2018, Higgins revealed in The Weekend Age that the song was an apology to her older sister, who also liked a boy that she liked but ended up going out with Higgins.

The single was released in Australia on 4 April 2005 as The Special Two EP, and it entered the ARIA Singles Chart at number two. One of the B-sides featured with the single is a cover of the Skyhooks song "You Just Like Me Cause I'm Good in Bed". Higgins invited her sister to the concert when she first played it 'for someone in the crowd tonight', and her sister cried. At the 2005 ARIA Music Awards, the song was nominated for Single of the Year and Highest Selling Single, losing to Ben Lee's "Catch My Disease" and Anthony Callea's "The Prayer", respectively. In 2025, the song placed 52 on the Triple J Hottest 100 of Australian Songs.

== Track listing ==
Australian CD single

1. "The Special Two" – 4:26
2. "Drop the Mirror" – 4:35
3. "Blind Winter" – 3:19
4. "You Just Like Me Cause I'm Good in Bed" – 2:45

== Charts ==
=== Weekly charts ===
Chart (2005)	Peak position
Australia (ARIA)	2

=== Year-end charts ===
Chart (2005)	Position
Australia (ARIA)	28

== Certifications ==
Region	Certification	Certified units/sales
Australia (ARIA)	2× Platinum	140,000^{‡}
^{‡} Sales+streaming figures based on certification alone.
