= Natasha Pincus =

Australian film maker

- Occupations: Film director and producer
- Notable work: "Somebody That I Used to Know" and "Everyone's Waiting (song)" (video clips)

Natasha Pincus is an Australian creative film maker. Pincus has created music videos for a number of Australian musicians, including Powderfinger, Paul Kelly, Gotye, Missy Higgins, The Paper Kites and Sarah Blasko. Pincus created a major film work for the Australian premiere production of David Bowie's Lazarus stage show, for which she conceived of and directed 16 narratively connected Bowie music videos.

Pincus has written more than 20 feature film and TV scripts for projects in Australia and the USA. Pincus is also a qualified lawyer and research scientist.

== Awards and nominations ==
=== ARIA Music Awards ===
The ARIA Music Awards is an annual awards ceremony that recognises excellence, innovation, and achievement across all genres of Australian music. They commenced in 1987.

Year	Nominee / work	Award	Result	Ref.
2011	Natasha Pincus for Gotye featuring Kimbra's "Somebody That I Used to Know"	Best Video	Won	
2012	Natasha Pincus for Missy Higgins' "Everyone's Waiting"	Best Video	Won	

=== Inside Film Awards ===
The Inside Film Awards (now known as the IF Awards) is an annual awards ceremony and broadcast platform for the Australian film industry. It ran from 2007-2008 and 2010.

Year	Nominee / work	Award	Result	Ref.
2012	Natasha Pincus for Paul Kelly's "God Told Me to"	The 3 IF Award for Best Music Video	awarded	

=== J Awards ===
The J Awards are an annual series of Australian music awards that were established by the Australian Broadcasting Corporation's youth-focused radio station Triple J. They commenced in 2005.

Year	Nominee / work	Award	Result
2011	Natasha Pincus for "Somebody That I Used to Know"	Australian Video of the Year	Nominated

=== MTV Awards ===
The MTV Video Music Awards (commonly abbreviated as the VMAs) is an award show presented by the cable channel MTV to honour the best in the music video medium.

Year	Nominee / work	Award	Result	Ref.
2012	Natasha Pincus for Gotye featuring Kimbra's "Somebody That I Used to Know"	MTV Video Music Award for Best Editing	Nominated	
