= Where I Stood =

2007 single by Missy Higgins

Single by Missy Higgins

from the album On a Clear Night
- B-side: "Stuff and Nonsense"; "Wrong Girl" (live); "Beautiful Mind" (live)
- Released: 4 August 2007
- Length: 4:17 (album version); 4:09 (Up Tempo mix)
- Label: Eleven
- Songwriter: Missy Higgins
- Producer: Mitchell Froom

Missy Higgins singles chronology
"Steer" (2007)	"Where I Stood" (2007)	"Peachy" (2007)

"Where I Stood" is the second single from Australian singer-songwriter Missy Higgins' second album, On a Clear Night (2007). The single was released on 4 August 2007 and reached No. 10 on the Australian ARIA Singles Chart. In the United States, it became Higgins' second song to appear on the Billboard charts, reaching number 10 on the Adult Contemporary ranking. In a similar promotional scenario as her previous single "Steer", Higgins gave her fans the opportunity to purchase a signed single along with signed lyrics.

The song has been heard in a number of television shows including Grey's Anatomy, Pretty Little Liars, Ghost Whisperer and Smallville.

== Music video ==
There are two videos for the song: one for Australia and one for the United States. The Australian video premiered at midnight (12am AEST) on 26 June 2007, via Higgins' MySpace page. The video was directed by Australian filmmakers Paul Goldman and Alice Bell, who were also responsible for Silverchair's "Straight Lines" video. The US video uses a more uptempo mix of the song which is also the version played on American radio stations, rather than the version that appears on the album. This version was directed by Steven Murashige. Both videos can be seen on Higgins' website.

== Track listings ==
Australian EP

1. "Where I Stood"
2. "Stuff and Nonsense"
3. "Wrong Girl" (live at Triple J)
4. "Beautiful Mind" (live at Centennial Park)

US EP

1. "Where I Stood"
2. "Dusty Road"
3. "Stuff and Nonsense"
4. "Wrong Girl" (live)

== Charts ==
=== Weekly charts ===
Chart (2007–2009)	Peak position
Australia (ARIA)	10
Canada AC (Billboard)	38
US Bubbling Under Hot 100 (Billboard)	7
US Adult Alternative Airplay (Billboard)	28
US Adult Contemporary (Billboard)	10
US Adult Pop Airplay (Billboard)	19
US Pop 100 (Billboard)	84

=== Year-end charts ===
Chart (2007)	Position
Australian Artists (ARIA)	31

Chart (2008)	Position
US Adult Contemporary (Billboard)	45

Chart (2009)	Position
US Adult Contemporary (Billboard)	29

== Certifications ==
Region	Certification	Certified units/sales
Australia (ARIA)	Platinum	70,000^{‡}
United States (RIAA)	Gold	500,000^{^}
^{^} Shipments figures based on certification alone.^{‡} Sales+streaming figures based on certification alone.

== Release history ==
Region	Date	Format(s)	Label(s)	Ref.
Australia	4 August 2007	CD	Eleven	
United States	27 January 2009	Contemporary hit radio	Reprise	
