= The Sound of White =

Studio album by Missy Higgins
- Released: 6 September 2004
- Recorded: 2004
- Length: 49:46
- Labels: Eleven; Reprise
- Producer: John Porter

Missy Higgins chronology
The Missy Higgins EP (2003)	The Sound of White (2004)	All for Believing (2005)

Singles from The Sound of White
- 1. "Scar" Released: 2 August 2004; 2. "Ten Days" Released: 15 November 2004; 3. "The Special Two" Released: 4 April 2005; 4. "The Sound of White" Released: 15 August 2005

The Sound of White is the debut studio album by Australian pop singer-songwriter Missy Higgins, released 6 September 2004 by Eleven. It won the 2005 ARIA Music Award for Best Female Artist. Higgins had secured recording contracts with Eleven and Warner Bros. while still in high school, after winning a competition for unsigned artists run by radio station Triple J. Her winning song, "All For Believing", is included on this album. After a backpacking trip in 2002, Higgins toured and wrote songs during 2003. She wrote most tracks alone and collaborated on three songs, with Kevin Griffin, Jay Clifford and Clif Magness respectively. The Sound of White was recorded in 2004 with producer John Porter.

Higgins' first single from the album was "Scar", released in August ahead of the album. Three more singles were released, "Ten Days" in November, "The Special Two" in April 2005 and "The Sound of White" in August. Critics gave the album mixed reviews and it achieved commercial success, reaching number one on the Australian Recording Industry Association (ARIA) Albums Chart and was accredited platinum twelve times. The album was nominated for five ARIA Awards in 2004 and won 'Best Pop Release'. The following year it was nominated for eight ARIA awards and won five. In 2005, Higgins won the Australasian Performing Right Association (APRA) 'Song of the Year' award for "Scar".

== Background and recording ==
In 2001, while still at high school, Higgins wrote the song "All for Believing" as part of a music assignment. The song won Unearthed, a competition for unsigned artists run by radio station Triple J and was added to their playlist. She was offered recording contracts by Sony and Eleven. She signed with Eleven before setting off in 2002 on a backpacking trip to Europe. She planned to write music during her trip but, leaving her guitar on a train in Spain, only completed one song. While holidaying, "All for Believing" was picked up by Los Angeles (LA) radio station KCRW and at the end of her trip, she flew to LA to sign an international recording contract with Warner Bros.

In 2003, Higgins spent several months touring as a support act for other artists, and writing music for her debut album. She wrote most of the songs alone, and most of them on the piano. She collaborated with Better Than Ezra musician Kevin Griffin on two songs; "Scar" and "Don't Ever". "Ten Days", inspired by Higgins' break-up with her boyfriend before she travelled to Europe, was co-written with Jay Clifford from Jump, Little Children. "The River" was co-written with Clif Magness.

In November, Higgins released a self-titled extended play (EP), which contains four songs, including "All for Believing" and "Greed for Your Love", the song she had written in Europe. In 2004, she travelled to the US to work with British musician and record producer John Porter and engineer and mixer Jay Newland. Porter assembled a group of session musicians for the album, including drummer Michael Barker, bassist John Patitucci and cellist Martin Tillman.

== Release ==
Higgins released her first single from the album, "Scar" on 2 August 2004; it entered the ARIA Singles Chart at No. 1. The Sound of White was released in Australia on 6 September. It entered the ARIA Albums Chart at No. 1 and stayed in the top 50 for 85 weeks. It was certified nine times platinum by ARIA. It entered the New Zealand album chart at No. 40, peaked at No. 19 and remained on the chart for 11 weeks. Three more singles were released from the album. "Ten Days" was released 15 November, entering at No. 14, later rising to No. 12. "The Special Two" was released as an EP on 4 April 2005. It entered the ARIA Singles Chart at No. 2 and stayed on the chart for 19 weeks. "The Sound of White" was released 15 August. It entered the chart at No. 22 and left it after five weeks. The album was released in the United Kingdom on 6 June and the US on 7 June on Reprise (a label owned by Warner Bros.)

Higgins promoted the album in Australia in October 2004 with her first national tour as a headline act.

The album was released in the USA on 7 June 2005.

== Critical reception ==
Professional ratings
Review scores
Source	Rating
AllMusic	3.5/5 stars
Rolling Stone	2/5 stars

In his 2009 book Playlisted: Everything You Need to Know About Australian Music Right Now, Craig Mathieson said that The Sound of White was lyrically "descriptively giving, often heartbroken and occasionally delusional".

Christian Hoard and Jonathan Ringen of Rolling Stone were unimpressed by the album. Although they praised the production, they called it "utterly conventional" and said that Higgins was "too bland" to succeed in the US. Allmusic's Jonathan Widran was more impressed, also praising the album's production as well as more lightly produced tracks "Don't Ever", "Night Minds" and "The Sound of White". He said "there's no doubt she'll be the one up-and-coming singers want to compare themselves to". Writing for Entertainment Weekly, Holly George-Warren said that the album was "reminiscent of early Suzanne Vega and Sarah McLachlan" and that it sounded "just right". Billboard gave the album a positive review, praising Higgins' use of different genres and noting her "refreshing Melbourne accent" and concluding that it was "tailor-made for lazy summer days".

=== Accolades ===
In October 2010, The Sound of White was listed in the book, 100 Best Australian Albums.

== Awards and nominations ==
Higgins received six ARIA Awards for The Sound of White. In 2004, at the 18th Annual ARIA Music Awards, Higgins was nominated for 'Single of the Year', 'Best Female Artist', 'Breakthrough Artist — Single' and 'Best Pop Release', all for "Scar". She won the award for 'Best Pop Release'. Squareyed Films received a nomination for 'Best Video' for "Scar". The following year, at the 19th Annual ARIA Music Awards, Higgins received five more awards; 'Best Female Artist' (for "Scar"), 'Breakthrough Artist — Album', 'Highest Selling Album', 'Best Pop Release' (for "The Sound of White") and 'Album of the Year'. She was also nominated for 'Single of the Year' and 'Highest Selling Single', both for "The Special Two". Cathie Glassby received a nomination for 'Best Cover Art' for The Sound of White.

In 2005 at the Australasian Performing Right Association (APRA) Awards, which recognise song writing, sales and airplay performance, Higgins was nominated for two awards; 'Song of the Year' (for "Scar" and "Ten Days") and 'Breakthrough Award' (for an emerging songwriter). She won the 'Song of the Year' award (with "Scar"'s co-writer Kevin Griffin) and the 'Breakthrough Award'. Aged 21 at the time, she was the youngest recipient of the 'Song of the Year' APRA award to date.

== Legacy and cultural influence ==
"One of the most popular releases in Australian history", The Sound of White is credited as a turning point for women in Australian music; with various female Australian musicians, including Alice Skye, Amy Shark, Gordi, Gretta Ray, Odette, and Sammi Constantine all citing the album as a musical influence.

Folktronica musician Gordi discussed the album's influence on her in a Love Letter to a Record piece for Australian music website Music Feeds, stating "[it's] the reason I write songs the way I do, so personally and so honestly, with nothing to hide and everything to give." Pop musician Odette "resonated" with the album, saying: "that album messed me up. If I ever meet Missy, I'll tell her that it's her fault I'm so emotional. Those songs were so relatable and really dark but emotionally bold."

== Track listing ==
The album was slightly varied for its international release, replacing the track "Casualty" with "Unbroken" and including the song "They Weren't There" as a secret track and a remixed version of "Scar", known as the Jay Newland Mix.

=== Australian release ===
No.	Title	Writer(s)	Length
1.	"All for Believing"	Missy Higgins	3:27
2.	"Don't Ever"	Higgins, Kevin Griffin	2:52
3.	"Scar"	Higgins, Griffin	3:36
4.	"Ten Days"	Higgins, James Major Clifford	3:45
5.	"Nightminds"	Higgins	3:19
6.	"Casualty"	Higgins, Griffin	4:14
7.	"Any Day Now"	Higgins	3:51
8.	"Katie"	Higgins, Clif Magness	3:38
9.	"The River"	Higgins	4:28
10.	"The Special Two"	Higgins	4:27
11.	"This Is How It Goes"	Higgins	3:32
12.	"The Sound of White"	Higgins	4:49
13.	"They Weren't There"	Higgins	4:07
Total length:			50:05

=== International release ===
1. "All for Believing" – 3:27
2. "Ten Days" – 3:45
3. "Scar" (Jay Newland Mix) – 3:32
4. "Don't Ever" – 2:52
5. "Nightminds" – 3:13
6. "Unbroken" (Higgins, Griffin) – 3:41
7. "Any Day Now" – 3:51
8. "Katie" – 3:35
9. "The River" – 4:23
10. "The Special Two" – 4:27
11. "This Is How It Goes" – 3:28
12. "The Sound of White" – 9:06 (includes time for following track)
13. "They Weren't There" (hidden track)

== Personnel ==
Music

- Michael Barker – percussion
- Dean Butterworth – drums
- Keith Christopher – bass
- Carlos Cordova – double bass, bass (upright)
- Debra Dobkin – percussion
- Walt Fowler – flugelhorn
- Missy Higgins – acoustic guitar, piano, vocals
- Greg Leisz – dobro, electric guitar, steel guitar, lap steel guitar
- Darrell Leonard – flugelhorn
- Stuart Mathis – acoustic guitar, electric guitar
- Helen Mountfort – cello
- Jamie Muhoberac – piano, keyboards
- Jay Newland – acoustic guitar
- John Patitucci – bass (upright)
- John Porter – acoustic guitar, mandolin, electric guitar, keyboards, 12 string acoustic guitar
- Martin Tillman – cello, electric cello
- Ken Wiley – French horn

Production

- James Dowdall – A&R
- Ted Jensen – mastering
- Jay Newland – mixing
- Andy Olyphant – A&R
- Rik Pekkonen – engineer
- John Porter – producer, engineer, audio production
- Doug Tyo – assistant

Design

- Cathie Glassby – artwork
- Adrienne Overall – photography

== Charts ==
=== Weekly charts ===
Chart (2004–2007)	Peak position
Australian Albums (ARIA)	1
New Zealand Albums (RMNZ)	19

=== Year-end charts ===
Chart (2004)	Position
Australian Albums (ARIA)	15
Chart (2005)	Position
Australian Albums (ARIA)	1

=== Decade-end charts ===
Chart (2000–2009)	Position
Australian Albums (ARIA)	5
Australian Albums (ARIA)	2

== Certifications ==
Region	Certification	Certified units/sales
Australia (ARIA)	12× Platinum	840,000^{‡}
^{‡} Sales+streaming figures based on certification alone.

== Release history ==
Region	Date	Format(s)	Label	Edition	Catalogue
Australia	6 September 2004	CD, download	Eleven	original	ELEVENCD27
Australia	6 September 2004	2×CD, download	Eleven	original + Live at the Horden EP	ELEVENCD27SP
Australia	2005	2×CD, download	Eleven	re-issue	ELEVENCD27B
Various (international)	2005	CD+DVD, download	Reprise Records	international version	—N/a
Australia	2018	Vinyl	Eleven	original	ELEVENV27
Australia	5 April 2024	2×CD, 2×LP	Eleven	deluxe edition	ELEVENV27

== See also ==
- List of best-selling albums in Australia
