= Scar (song) =

2004 single by Missy Higgins

Single by Missy Higgins

from the album The Sound of White
- B-side: "Casualty"; "Dancing Dirt into the Snow"; "The Cactus That Found the Beat"
- Released: 2 August 2004
- Length: 3:36
- Label: Eleven
- Composers: Missy Higgins; Kevin Griffin
- Lyricist: Missy Higgins
- Producer: John Porter

Missy Higgins singles chronology
"Scar" (2004)	"Ten Days" (2004)

"Scar" is a pop song written by Australian singer Missy Higgins and Kevin Griffin of American band Better Than Ezra. Released on 2 August 2004 on Eleven: A Music Company, it was released as the first single from Higgins' debut album, The Sound of White (2004). "Scar" entered the Australian ARIA Singles Chart at number one and received a quadruple-platinum sales certification. It also charted in New Zealand, where it peaked at number 20 in January 2005. The song was mixed by 12-time Grammy winner Jay Newland. In 2025 the song was voted fourth on the Triple J Hottest 100 of Australian Songs.

== Background ==
Following the song's fourth-place finish on the Triple J Hottest 100 of Australian Songs, Higgins shared that the song was written as a response to negative experiences she had had with collaborators in the music industry.

It was the song I wrote when I was 19 about some bad experiences I had with different people I was collaborating with, who were trying to make my music into something else. And trying to make me sound a certain way and appear a certain way, and just people in the industry that I'd come across that were, you know, trying to squeeze a triangle through a circle or whatever it is I say. So, you know, it's a song about staying true to who you are and not letting anyone else, you know, pretend that they know what's best for you.

== Awards and nominations ==
=== Awards ===
- 2004 ARIA Awards, Best Pop Release
- 2005 APRA Awards, Song of the Year
- 2005 APRA Awards, Breakthrough Award

=== Nominations ===
- 2004 ARIA Awards, Single of the Year
- 2004 ARIA Awards, Best Female Artist
- 2004 ARIA Awards, Breakthrough Artist — Single
- 2004 ARIA Awards, Best Video

== Track listing ==
Australian CD single

1. "Scar" – 3:34
2. "Casualty" – 4:12
3. "Dancing Dirt into the Snow" – 3:26
4. "The Cactus That Found the Beat" – 2:02

== Personnel ==
Personnel are lifted from the Australian CD single liner notes.

- Missy Higgins – lyrics, music, vocals
- Kevin Griffin – music
- John Porter – production
- Rik Pekkonen – engineering
- Jay Newland – mixing
- Don Bartley – mastering
- Cathie Glassby – artwork design
- Adrienne Overall – photography

== Charts ==
=== Weekly charts ===
Chart (2004–2006)	Peak position
Australia (ARIA)	1
New Zealand (Recorded Music NZ)	20
US Adult Pop Airplay (Billboard)	34

=== Year-end charts ===
Chart (2004)	Position
Australia (ARIA)	22

== Certifications ==
Region	Certification	Certified units/sales
Australia (ARIA)	5× Platinum	350,000^{‡}
New Zealand (RMNZ)	Gold	15,000^{‡}
^{‡} Sales+streaming figures based on certification alone.

== Release history ==
Region	Date	Format(s)	Label(s)	Ref.
Australia	2 August 2004	CD	Eleven	
United States	6 June 2005	Triple A radio	Reprise	
United States	13 February 2006	Hot adult contemporary radio	Reprise	
