= Ten Days (song) =

2004 single by Missy Higgins

Single by Missy Higgins

from the album The Sound of White
- Released: 15 November 2004
- Length: 3:45
- Label: Eleven
- Songwriters: Missy Higgins, Jay Clifford
- Producer: John Porter

Missy Higgins singles chronology
"Scar" (2004)	"Ten Days" (2004)	"The Special Two" (2005)

"Ten Days" is a song by Australian singer-songwriter Missy Higgins, written by Higgins and Jay Clifford of Jump, Little Children. It was the second single released from her debut album, The Sound of White (2004), on 15 November 2004. "Ten Days" peaked at No. 12 on the Australian ARIA Singles Chart. The Australian Recording Industry Association awarded the song a gold disc for selling over 35,000 copies. It was also voted No. 6 song on the Triple J Hottest 100 of 2004. The video features Higgins travelling to various places and many of the shots were filmed in Adelaide, South Australia.

== Background ==
Higgins signed a recording contract with Eleven while still at high school. After she left school she spent much of 2002 on a backpacking trip to Europe. When she returned she began writing music for her debut album, The Sound of White. The lyrics for "Ten Days" were inspired by Higgins' breakup with her boyfriend when she travelled to Europe. The song was written by Higgins and Jay Clifford, the guitarist and lead singer of American band Jump, Little Children.

== Release and reception ==
"Ten Days" was released in Australia on 15 November 2004. It entered the ARIA Singles Chart at No. 14 and later rose to No. 12, its peak, on 23 January 2005. It stayed on the chart for 20 weeks and was certified platinum. It spent five weeks on New Zealand's RIANZ Singles Chart, peaking at No. 39; as of 2026, it is Higgins' most recent single to chart in New Zealand. "Ten Days" was released in the United Kingdom on 30 May 2005, Higgins' first single to be released there. Although it did not enter the UK Singles Chart, it peaked at number 88 in Scotland and number 95 on the UK Physical Singles Chart. In 2005, the song was nominated for an Australasian Performing Right Association (APRA) award for Song of the Year but lost to Higgins' debut single, "Scar". The music video for "Ten Days" features footage of Higgins travelling through Europe.

== Awards and nominations ==
=== Nominations ===
- 2005 APRA Awards, Song of the Year

== Track listing ==
Australian CD single

1. "Ten Days"
2. "Greed for Your Love" (live)
3. "Scar" (live)
4. "The Special Two" (live)

== Charts ==
=== Weekly charts ===
Chart (2004–2005)	Peak position
Australia (ARIA)	12
New Zealand (Recorded Music NZ)	39
Scottish Singles Sales (Official Charts)	88
UK Physical Singles (OCC)	95

=== Year-end charts ===
Chart (2005)	Position
Australia (ARIA)	74

== Certifications ==
Region	Certification	Certified units/sales
Australia (ARIA)	Platinum	70,000^{‡}
^{‡} Sales+streaming figures based on certification alone.
