= Missy Higgins =

Australian musician (born 1983)

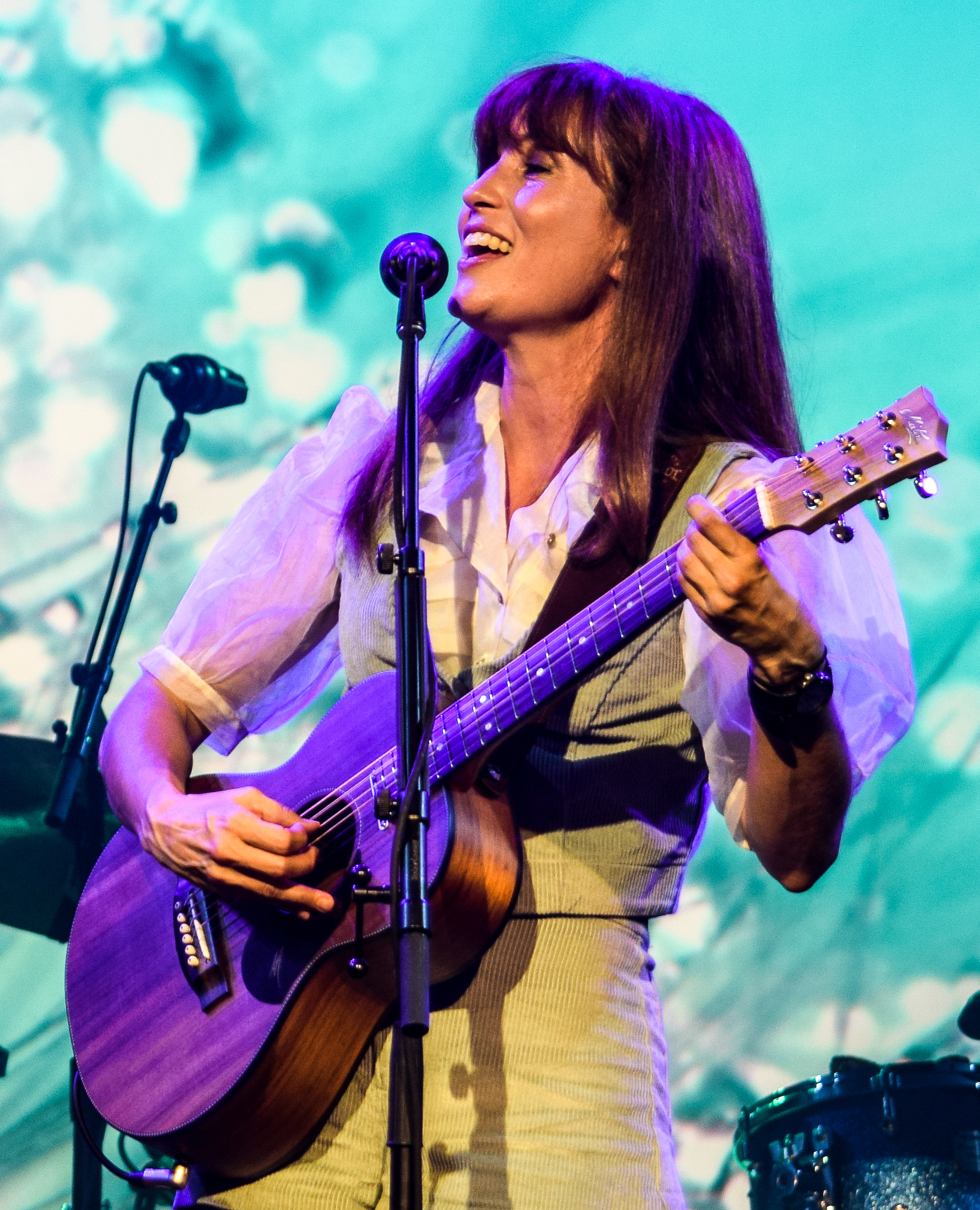
- Higgins performing at Bluesfest 2022

Background information
- Born: Melissa Morrison Higgins; 19 August 1983 (age 43); Melbourne, Australia
- Genres: Pop rock; indie; acoustic
- Occupations: Singer-songwriter, musician
- Instruments: Vocals; piano; synthesiser; guitar; melodica; xylophone; cowbell; ukulele
- Years active: 2001–present
- Labels: Eleven; Reprise; Warner Bros.
- Spouse: Dan Lee (m. 2016; sep. 2022)
- Website: missyhiggins.com.au

Melissa Morrison "Missy" Higgins (born 19 August 1983) is an Australian singer-songwriter and musician. Her most popular singles include "Scar", "Steer", and "Where I Stood". Her Australian number-one albums are The Sound of White (2004), On a Clear Night (2007) and The Ol' Razzle Dazzle (2012). In 2018, she released a greatest hits album called The Special Ones.

Higgins was nominated for five ARIA Music Awards in 2004 and won Best Pop Release for "Scar". In 2005, she was nominated for seven more awards and won five. Nominated for many more, Higgins won her seventh ARIA in 2007 and two more in 2012, including Best Adult Contemporary Album for The Ol' Razzle Dazzle.

Alongside her music career, Higgins pursues interests in animal rights and the environment, endeavouring to make her tours carbon neutral. In 2009, she made her acting debut in the music feature film Bran Nue Dae and also performed on its soundtrack.

== Early life and education ==
Melissa Morrison Higgins was born in Melbourne on 19 August 1983 to Christopher Higgins, an English-Australian general practitioner, and Margaret (née Morrison), an Australian childcare centre operator. Her sister, Nicola, is seven years older and her brother, David, six years older. Higgins learned to play classical piano from age six, following in the footsteps of Christopher and David, but realised she wanted to be a singer at about 12, when she appeared in an Armadale Primary School production of Andrew Lloyd Webber's musical Joseph and the Amazing Technicolor Dreamcoat. Bored with practice, she gave up playing piano at that time.

Hoping for more freedom, she urged her parents to send her to Geelong Grammar School, an independent boarding school that her siblings attended. At Geelong, Higgins took up the piano again, this time playing jazz and performing with her brother David's group on weekends. Introverted by nature, Higgins found that piano practice helped her cope with living at boarding school.

At 15, while attending Geelong Grammar's Timbertop, she wrote "All for Believing" for a school music assignment, completing it just hours before the deadline. The assignment earned an A and she performed her song in front of classmates. She approached a Melbourne record company and was told that they wanted more than one song. She wrote more songs and worked with the Kool Skools project, which enables students to record music.

In 2001 Missy's sister Nicola entered "All for Believing" on her behalf in Unearthed, radio station Triple J's competition for unsigned artists. The song won the competition and was added to the station's playlist.

== Career ==
=== Early career ===
Two record companies showed an interest in Higgins—Sony and Eleven. She signed with Eleven, partly because they agreed that she would not be "made into a pop star" and partly because they were happy for her to take time off for a backpacking holiday. Higgins's manager is Eleven's John Watson, who also managed rock band Silverchair. Watson later disclosed that "Missy's the only time in my career I knew after 90 seconds I really wanted to sign her." The backpacking trip had been planned with a friend for years and the pair spent most of 2002 in Europe; while Higgins was travelling, "All for Believing" started to receive airplay on Los Angeles radio station KCRW. Such radio exposure attracted the attention of American record labels and, by year's end, an international recording deal with Warner Bros. had been negotiated.

=== 2003–2005: The Sound of White ===
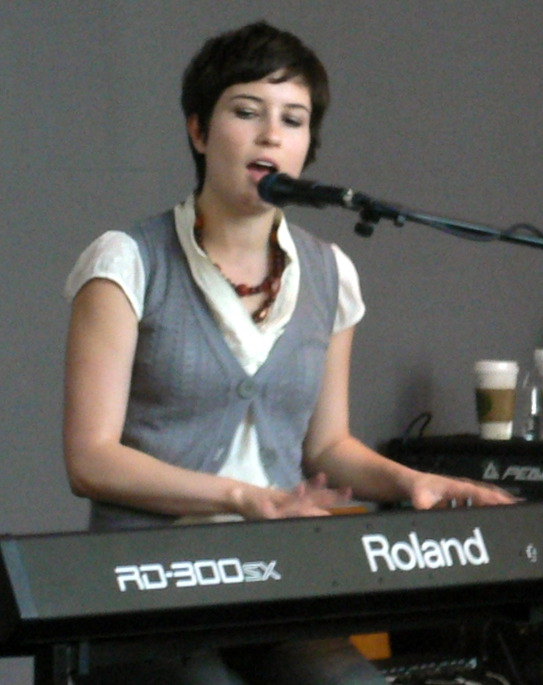
Higgins performing in 2005

Higgins was the support act on a 2003 Australian tour by folk rock band The Waifs and rock band george. She travelled to the US to work with John Porter, who produced her first EP, The Missy Higgins EP, which was released in November and entered the Australian Recording Industry Association (ARIA) Singles Chart Top 50 in August 2004.

She toured Australia, supporting Pete Murray and John Butler Trio. Her four-track single "Scar" was released in July 2004 and debuted at No. 1 on the ARIA Charts. Her first album, The Sound of White, was released in September, and debuted at No. 1 on the ARIA Albums Chart. Also produced by Porter, it sold over 500,000 copies. She was nominated in five categories at the ARIA Music Awards of 2004 for "Scar": Best Female Artist', 'Single of the Year', 'Best Pop Release', 'Breakthrough Artist – Single' and 'Best Video' (directed by Squareyed Films). At the awards ceremony on 17 October, she received the award for Best Pop Release, beating Delta Goodrem, The Dissociatives, Kylie Minogue and Pete Murray. This was followed by her first national headline tour. Her second single "Ten Days" was co-written with Jay Clifford (guitarist in US band Jump, Little Children) and was inspired by Higgins's 2002 break-up with her boyfriend before she travelled to Europe. Released in November, it peaked at No. 12.

On 29 January 2005, Higgins performed with other local musicians including Nick Cave and Powderfinger at the WaveAid fundraising concert in the Sydney Cricket Ground. The concert raised A$2.3 million for four charities supporting the victims of the 2004 Indian Ocean earthquake. In March Higgins performed at the MTV Australia Awards and won the prize for 'Breakthrough Artist of the Year'. The following month she released her third single, "The Special Two", which was a radio hit and reached No. 2. "The Special Two" was released and included her cover of the Skyhooks song, "You Just Like Me Cos I'm Good in Bed", recorded for Triple J's 30th anniversary. The song had been the first track played on Triple J when it launched (as Double J) in 1975. In May, Higgins won the 'Song of the Year' and 'Breakthrough' awards for "Scar" from the Australasian Performing Right Association (APRA). She continued touring in mid-2005 and released her fourth single, "The Sound of White", in August. In September she played a sold-out performance at the Vanguard in Sydney with the proceeds going to charity. She was nominated for seven more ARIAs and in October won 'Album of the Year', 'Best Pop Release', 'Breakthrough Artist – Album' and 'Highest Selling Album' (all for The Sound of White) and 'Best Female Artist' (for "Scar"). She teamed up with fellow ARIA award-winning singer Ben Lee in late 2005 for a national tour.

=== 2006–2009: On a Clear Night ===
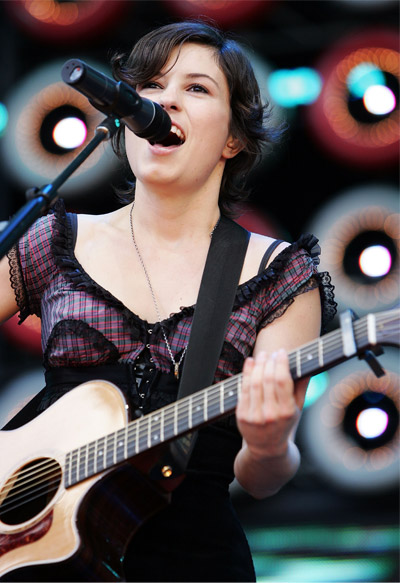
Higgins, Live Earth concert, Sydney, 7 July 2007

During 2006 Higgins lived in Broome, Western Australia for six months, away from the entertainment industry. The relaxed lifestyle helped her focus on writing new material. The landscape made a big impression, "It was the first place I'd ever felt honestly connected with my country, with the physical land of my country" and inspired her to write "Going North". She then toured the United States and South Africa, writing more material on the road. In September she based herself in Los Angeles to record her second album, On a Clear Night, with producer Mitchell Froom. "Steer" was released on 14 April 2007, followed a fortnight later by its album on 28 April 2007, both debuted at No. 1 on their respective charts.

In February Higgins had contributed a tribute song to the album, Cannot Buy My Soul, for noted indigenous singer, Kev Carmody, singing "Droving Woman" with musician Paul Kelly and group Augie March. On 7 July, she participated in the Live Earth concert in Sydney, performing her own set before joining Carmody, Kelly and vocalist John Butler on stage for the song "From Little Things Big Things Grow". Emily Dunn in The Sydney Morning Herald wrote "[the song] could have been the event's anthem". Rolling Stone's Dan Lander pointed out a highlight, when the "whole crowd sung along – all eleven verses."

Higgins returned to Los Angeles to focus on the US market—she spent September and October touring—where she was still relatively unknown. On 26 October, backed by the Sydney Youth Orchestra, she headlined the annual Legs 11 concert, a breast cancer benefit held in The Domain, Royal Botanic Gardens, Sydney. Two days later Higgins performed at the 2007 ARIAs where she was nominated for 'Best Pop Release', 'Highest Selling Album' and 'Highest Selling Single' (for "Steer") and won 'Best Female Artist' (for On a Clear Night)—her seventh ARIA Music Award. On 31 October, she was a guest at television music channel MAX's inaugural Concert for the Cure, a private concert for people affected by breast cancer. She sang headline act Powderfinger's "Sunsets" with front man Bernard Fanning and joined in with the encore of "These Days". She spent November and December on her For One Night Only Tour, taking in Cairns, Sydney and Perth. You Am I lead singer, Tim Rogers, joined her on some shows.

On a Clear Night, was released in the US on 26 February 2008, supported by a tour in March. Her ten-month stay in Los Angeles during 2008 promoted her songs for films and television shows. Her first US single "Where I Stood" was featured in US series including Smallville, Grey's Anatomy, Ghost Whisperer, One Tree Hill and So You Think You Can Dance. During 2008, Higgins supported the Indigo Girls and then Ben Folds on their respective US tours. February and March 2009 saw her co-headlining a US tour with Canadian Justin Nozuka. On 31 March 2009 she released "More Than This" which was recorded as part of Covered, A Revolution in Sound, a Warner Bros. tribute album also released in March 2009.

=== 2010–2013: The Ol' Razzle Dazzle ===
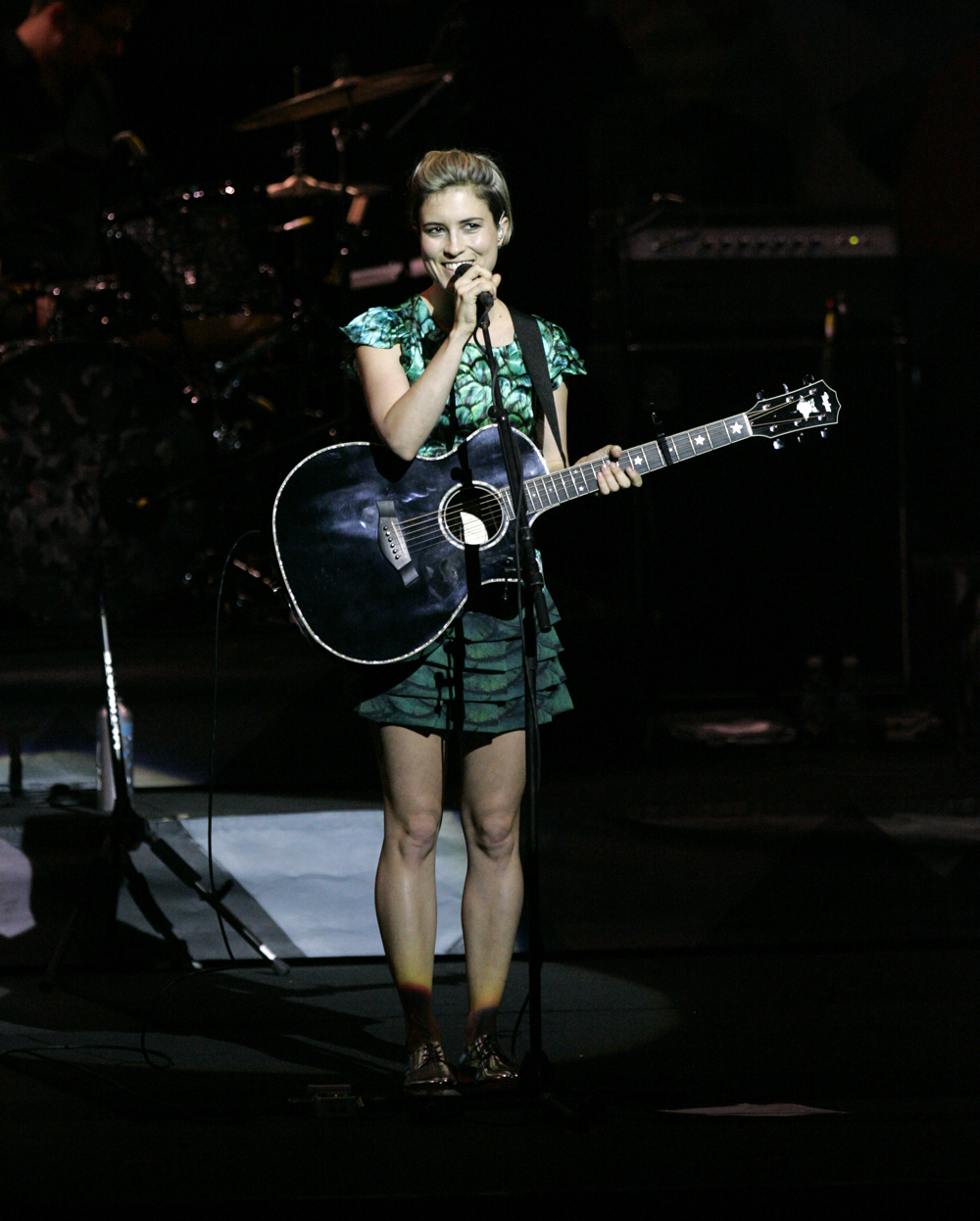
Higgins performing in 2012

Higgins started writing music, for her third album, in 2009. After about seven years of touring and recording she took a break from the music industry to pursue other interests. In 2010 she enrolled in a course in indigenous studies at the University of Melbourne. Her acting debut was as Annie in 2009 film Bran Nue Dae directed by Rachel Perkins. The film is an adaptation of the 1990 musical Bran Nue Dae, "Australia's first Aboriginal musical". Although Higgins would consider future acting projects, she had no plans to actively pursue it as a career.

In July and August 2010 Higgins played several dates of Sarah McLachlan's Lilith Fair tour in the US. At Lilith Fair, she met Australian musician Butterfly Boucher and they decided to work together. In 2011, Higgins travelled to where Boucher was living in Nashville to record her third album, which is co-produced by Boucher and Brad Jones. Titled The Ol' Razzle Dazzle, the album was released on 1 June 2012. Its first single, "Unashamed Desire", co-written with Boucher, was released on 23 April. In November 2011, at the ARIA Music Awards, Higgins performed a duet of "Warwu" with Geoffrey Gurrumul Yunupingu, from his Rrakala album.

"The Ol' Razzle Dazzle" album debuted at No. 1 on the ARIA Albums Chart the week of 12 June 2012. It was Higgins' 3rd straight number one album. As of January 2019, Higgins ties Olivia Newton-John for the 3rd highest tally of Australian Number One albums by an Australian female artist. Only Delta Goodrem (with four Number 1 ARIA albums) and Kylie Minogue and Kasey Chambers (with five each) have achieved more.

=== 2014: Oz ===
In September 2014 Higgins released her fourth studio album, Oz, which features cover versions of Australian composers, including The Angels, Slim Dusty, Something For Kate, Warumpi Band, Paul Kelly and The Drones. The album is also accompanied by a book of related essays, in which Higgins uses each of the recordings to reflect upon subjects such as music and love. Higgins collaborated with Dan Sultan for the recording of the Slim Dusty song "The Biggest Disappointment".

Higgins explained in an October 2014 interview that she experienced a significant bout of writer's block following the completion of her second album and someone suggested an album of cover versions at the time, but she only revisited the idea during the conception of Oz. Higgins further explained:

I responded to all these songs on an emotional level, when I first heard them. I wanted songs I felt I could tell with my own voice, and interpret them authentically ... But it was important to maintain the emotional integrity and the heart of the song. It was a high priority to keep true to the songs.

The album was co-produced by Jherek Bischoff, who previously worked with David Byrne, formerly of Talking Heads, and Amanda Palmer.

Oz debuted at number 3 on the ARIA Albums chart and remained in the top five positions until 18 October 2014.

The national Australian tour in support of Oz commenced on 20 September 2014 in Cairns, Queensland, and ended in Melbourne in October 2014. Higgins was accompanied by Bischoff, and Australian artist Dustin Tebbutt appeared as a special guest.

=== 2015–2023: Solastalgia, The Special Ones and Total Control ===
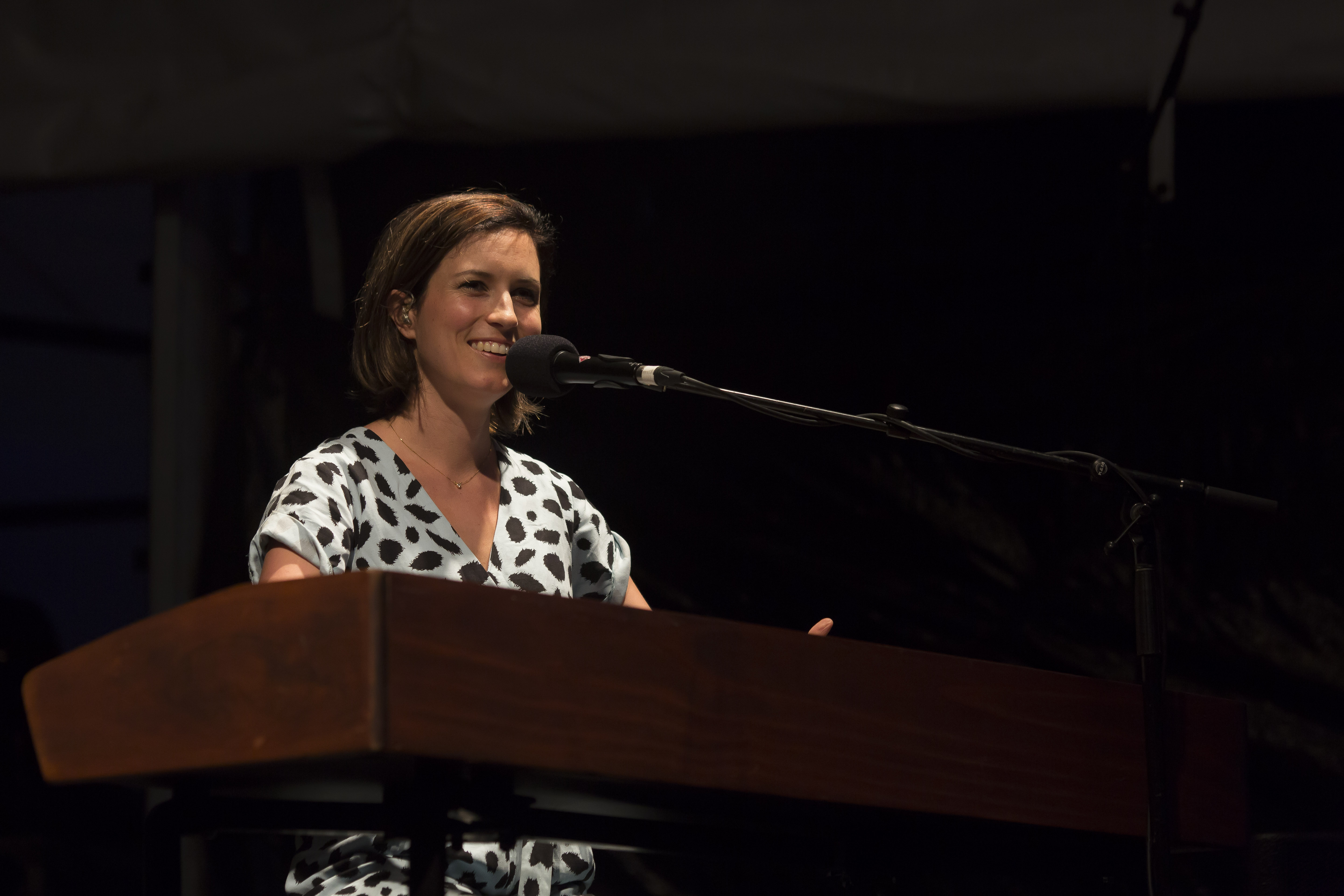
Higgins, performing in 2016

On 19 February 2016 Higgins released a new single titled, "Oh Canada", in her response to the death of Alan Kurdi.

In May 2017 Higgins released "Torchlight", for the Australian drama film, Don't Tell.

In October 2017, Higgins appeared in a revival of the 1996 musical Miracle City by Nick Enright and Max Lambert at the Sydney Opera House, playing the role of Bonnie Mae.

In February 2018 Higgins released the single "Futon Couch", the first single from her fifth studio album, called Solastalgia, released in May 2018.

In February 2018 it was announced that Missy Higgins would support Ed Sheeran's tour around Australia.

In November 2018 Higgins released her first greatest hits album titled The Special Ones. A stand-alone single, "When the Machine Starts", was released in November 2020; a second, "Edge of Something", was released in October 2021.

In October 2019 new music by Higgins featured in the Australian television series Total Control. This would later serve as the basis of a mini-album, also titled Total Control, that Higgins released on 4 March 2022.

=== 2024: The Second Act ===
On 23 February 2024 Higgins released "You Should Run", the lead single from her forthcoming sixth studio album. The album, titled The Second Act, was released on 6 September 2024. The album was written in the wake of the breakup of her marriage in December 2021, and the songs deal with the sadness associated with this event.

== Musical influences and technique ==
Higgins grew up in the 1980s and 1990s listening to artists that her older siblings liked—Nicola played Mariah Carey and Whitney Houston, while David favoured Queen and Kiss. Departing for boarding school at age 13, she was exposed to alternative artists like Nirvana and Hole and started teaching herself guitar and writing her own music. She also began singing with David's jazz group on weekends. As an adult she prefers Nina Simone and Ray Charles to "poppy dance music". She has cited Patty Griffin, Ron Sexsmith, Rufus Wainwright, Paul Kelly and Sarah McLachlan as influences. Material from her third album is influenced by ambient music from Low, Jon Hopkins, Icelandic band Sigur Rós and Estonian classical composer Arvo Pärt.

Higgins's songwriting grew out of a desire to express her emotions when she was at school, and her lyrics describe her feelings about her own life and relationships. The piano was the first instrument she learned to play, and she continues to use it as well as digital pianos, including a Roland RD-300SX, RD-700 and KR-15. She also uses guitars extensively in her music—particularly when touring, due to their portable nature—and favours the Australian brand Maton. On occasion, she plays keytar, xylophone and melodica during performances.

On 7 September 2012 Higgins recorded a cover version of Gotye's "Heart's A Mess" for the "Like a Version" segment on Australian radio station Triple J, explaining on-air that the song is her favourite Gotye composition. Higgins had travelled with Gotye previously and referred to him as "an incredible singer" in the interview prior to the rendition.

In the 2020 Australian documentary film Slim and I, directed by Kriv Stenders, Higgins paid tribute to the influence on her life and career of acclaimed Australian country music singer-songwriter couple Slim Dusty and Joy McKean. The film features interviews and covers of McKean songs by acclaimed contemporary artists including Higgins (The Biggest Disappointment), Keith Urban, Paul Kelly, and Troy Cassar-Daley.

She has also been a creative inspiration for a number of artists including Gretta Ray, Angie McMahon, G Flip and Amy Shark

== Activism and charitable works ==
Higgins has been active and vocal about many issues including climate and environmental issues, animal welfare, female empowerment, refugees and Indigenous issues. These issues have been influential to her works throughout her career.

=== Climate and environment ===
Higgins has been a longtime advocate for the environment and has actively participated in many environmental initiatives and events aimed at raising awareness on climate change and environmental issues. She is currently a patron of Green Music Australia, which aims to harness the cultural power of music to create a greener and safer planet.

From her early tours such as her On a Clear Night tour, Higgins has aimed for her tours to be carbon neutral, and she was named one of Billboard magazine's 2007 Top 10 Green Artists. She also contributed to Green Music Australia and Creative Victoria's 2022 initiative 'Sound Country: A Green Artist Guide' which aims to provide a practical framework for touring musicians to implement sustainable solutions.

Higgins has also participated in many environmental fundraising and donation campaigns including the Sierra Club's 2009 2% Solution Campaign where she made her song "Where I Stood" available for free to those who pledged to decrease their carbon output by 2% . Higgins also donated royalties from her 2009 "More Than This" to the Save the Kimberley organisation focused on conservation of Western Australia's Kimberley Region; an area which Higgins is passionate about protecting from industrialisation. In October 2012, Higgins also performed at two "Save the Kimberley" events held at Federation Square in Melbourne and The Esplanade in Fremantle, Western Australia; march to protest against the proposed gas refinery construction at James Price Point accompanied the free concert and campaign supporters were photographed with banners and placards.

Higgins was among 21 artists to write and record music for the album 'Sounds for the Reef' which raised funds for legal action against plans to turn Queensland's Abbot Point into one of the world's largest coal ports and the decision to allow dredging near the Great Barrier Reef. The album's 21 songs were sold on the Bandcamp website.

Higgins also vocally protested against the Adani coal mine in 2017, writing an open letter to the former Australian Opposition Leader Bill Shorten and former Australian Attorney-General Mark Dreyfus, and donating time to narrating two campaign videos and the #StopAdani Roadshow Opener.

Climate change played a large role in the creation of the music for her 2018 album 'Solostalgia', which was named for a kind of distress brought on by environmental changes close to home. The album is also influenced by the feeling of climate grief and climate anxiety.

=== Animal welfare ===
Higgins has been a vegetarian for many years after being introduced to the idea by an ex-boyfriend and wanted to do something for animals rights after reading 'Eating Animals' by Jonathan Safran Foer. She helped promote the 2005 People for the Ethical Treatment of Animals (PETA) advertising campaign and has supported their anti-fur stance.

In 2012 Higgins voiced a series of radio advertisements organised by the group Animals Australia in a campaign to put an end to battery-hen egg production in Australia. Higgins was one of numerous publicly known advocates for the 'Oscar's Law' campaign. The campaign, launched in 2010, protests against the existence of "puppy factories" in Australia, whereby animals are factory farmed. One of the campaign's slogans was "Break the Puppy Trade—Don't buy puppies from pet shops" and the list of notable advocates included Paul Dempsey, Kate Ceberano and Mick Molloy.

Higgins has also performed at animal welfare and conservation related fundraising and awareness concerts.This includes kicking off Animal Australia's 2013 event 'Animal Matters' with a performance of 'Hidden Ones', and performing at Melbourne Zoo's Twilights concert in 2012, 2013 and the 2020 where proceeds from the event went to conservation efforts and aims to save threatened species.

=== Refugees ===
In 2016 Missy Higgins released "Oh Canada", which was written from the perspective of the refugee father of Alan Kurdi, a two-year-old Syrian boy who drowned while fleeing to Europe. All of the song's net profits went to the Asylum Seeker Resource Centre (ASRC), and Higgins performed the song during the ASRC telethon held on World Refugee Day. In 2017 Higgins was announced as a new ASRC Ambassador and in 2018 appeared on ABC's Q&A program and expressed her views on the Australian Government's treatment of asylum seekers.

Higgins also featured in the 2022 documentary 'Scattered People: A Song Can Take You Home' presented by the ASRC and Being Reel Films, along with other Australian Musicians.

=== Female empowerment ===
Rolling Stone Australia called Higgins's soundtrack for the second season of the ABC drama Total Control an "outspoken fight for equality", and the work was inspired by Grace Tame and Brittany Higgins and the 2021 Australian Parliament House sexual misconduct allegations, with themes of exploitation and female empowerment. The album was about taking control as a woman, with songs like 'I Take It Back' which was written about reclaiming story, identity and power as a woman.

In 2021 Higgins appeared on the panel of ABC's Q&A Season Finale 'Power, Protests and Parliament' and discussed her views on the behaviour of Australian Parliament in relation to women in parliament, advice for young women who want to move into the music industry and the power imbalance of the music industry.

Higgins also headlined the all-female festival tour Wildflower in 2022 alongside Kate Miller-Heidke, Kasey Chambers, Sarah Blasko, Deborah Conway, Thornbird and Alice Skye to celebrate women and the return of the live scene.

Generational strength has also been a motivator for Higgins, wanting to show her daughter how to be a strong, independent woman.

=== Indigenous issues ===
Higgins undertook an Indigenous Studies course at the University of Melbourne and has been a supporter of Indigenous Australian peoples. In 2007 she joined the Oxfam Australia 'Close the Gap' campaign and recorded a cover of 'Droving Woman' with Augie March on the tribute album to Kev Carmody, an Aboriginal Australian singer-songwriter and musician. In 2008, Higgins collaborated on a re-release of the song "From Little Things Big Things Grow" along with Tim Levison and others. The song begins with a sample from the 2008 Formal Apology to the Stolen Generations made by former Australia Prime Minister Kevin Rudd.

When discussing the Indigenous Voice to Parliament, Higgins stated that First Nations people have never been treated as equals and have been oppressed as a people.

Higgins mentioned that her album Total Control was partly inspired by strong First Nations women whom she knew and in an interview with Rolling Stone Australia, Higgin's was quoted saying "Australian First Nations people have to cop so much every day and they're still surviving in a country that refuses to acknowledge our history."

=== Other charitable works ===
Higgins has also been involved in other charitable works throughout her career.

All proceeds from her 2015 charity show at Sydney's 'The Vanguard' were donated to the One in Five Foundation, a Melbourne charity supporting research into mental health.

In 2020, along with Tim Minchin, Higgins gave her support to the Fred Hollows Foundation with the collaborative song "Carry You" which was adapted to the foundation's 2020 campaign to encourage people to carry on Fred Hollows's legacy of ending avoidable blindness. She also performed the song with Minchin at the streamed charity concert Music from the Home Front which paid tribute to the Australian and New Zealand Army Corps and workers on the frontline of COVID-19 pandemic responses. Proceeds from the album of the same name went towards the music crisis charity Support Act.

In 2022 Higgins headlined the Nine Network telethon concert in support of the Children's Hospital Foundation, raising funds for medical research, equipment and support services for young patients and their families. Higgins also joined the Australian Red Cross event Australia Unites: Red Cross Flood Appeal along with other Australian artists to raise funds for victims of the 2022 eastern Australia floods.

== Personal life ==
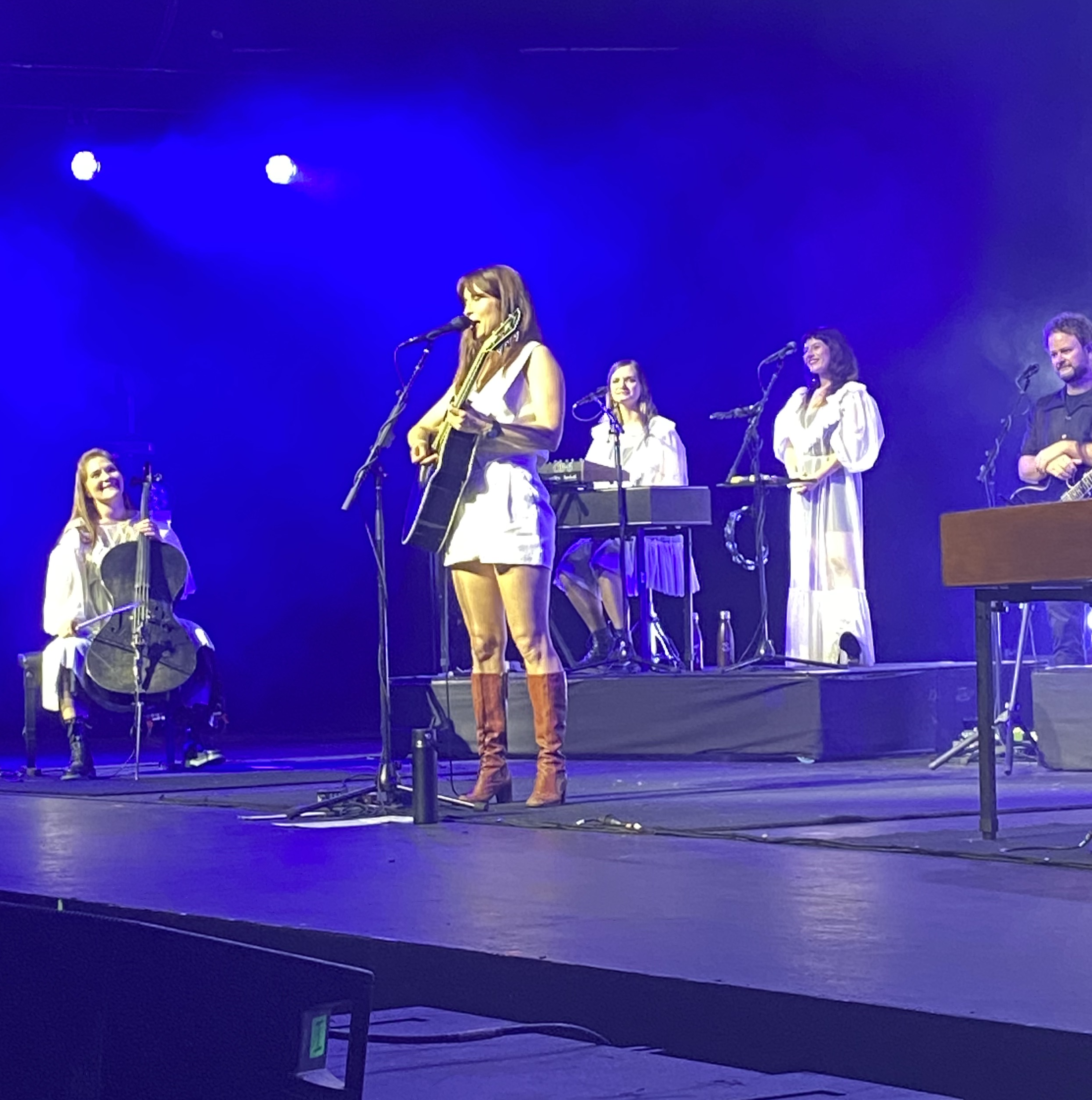
Missy Higgins during the Second Act tour. Melbourne, December 2024

Higgins has been a patron of multiple mental health charities since 2003. She described her younger self as introverted, and that she had "experienced various degrees of depression" from childhood onwards. Prescribed antidepressant medication while in high school, she learned to channel low moods into songwriting, calling music her "emotional outlet". In a 2006 interview she said that her songs were "coming from more of a happier place". While recording her second album, she discovered a passion for rock climbing, as a "meditative pursuit".

From 2004 to 2007 Higgins's sexual orientation was the subject of media speculation based partly on interpretations of her lyrics and her interviews. In an October 2007 interview with Australian lesbian magazine Cherrie, she was asked if she fell under the moniker of "not-so-straight" girls. She replied "Yeah, definitely. ... I think sexuality is a fluid thing and it's becoming increasingly more acceptable to admit that you're that way." In November 2007, her Myspace page and website reported, "I've been in relationships with both men and women so I guess I fall most easily under the category 'Bisexual'." In 2024 it was revealed that she had had a relationship with her female tour manager during those early years.

In 2013 Higgins began a relationship with Broome playwright and comedian Dan Lee. Higgins gave birth to a son in 2015. Higgins and Lee were married in March 2016, and she gave birth to a daughter in August 2018.

In early 2022 Higgins and Lee separated amicably. The songs on her 2024 album, The Second Act, were written during and following the breakup. She spoke at some length about her career and relationships on Australian Story in August 2024.

== Discography ==
- The Sound of White (2004)
- On a Clear Night (2007)
- The Ol' Razzle Dazzle (2012)
- Oz (2014)
- Solastalgia (2018)
- The Second Act (2024)

== Filmography ==
- 2010: Bran Nue Dae as Annie
- 2014: Unity – Narrator (Documentary)

== Awards and nominations ==
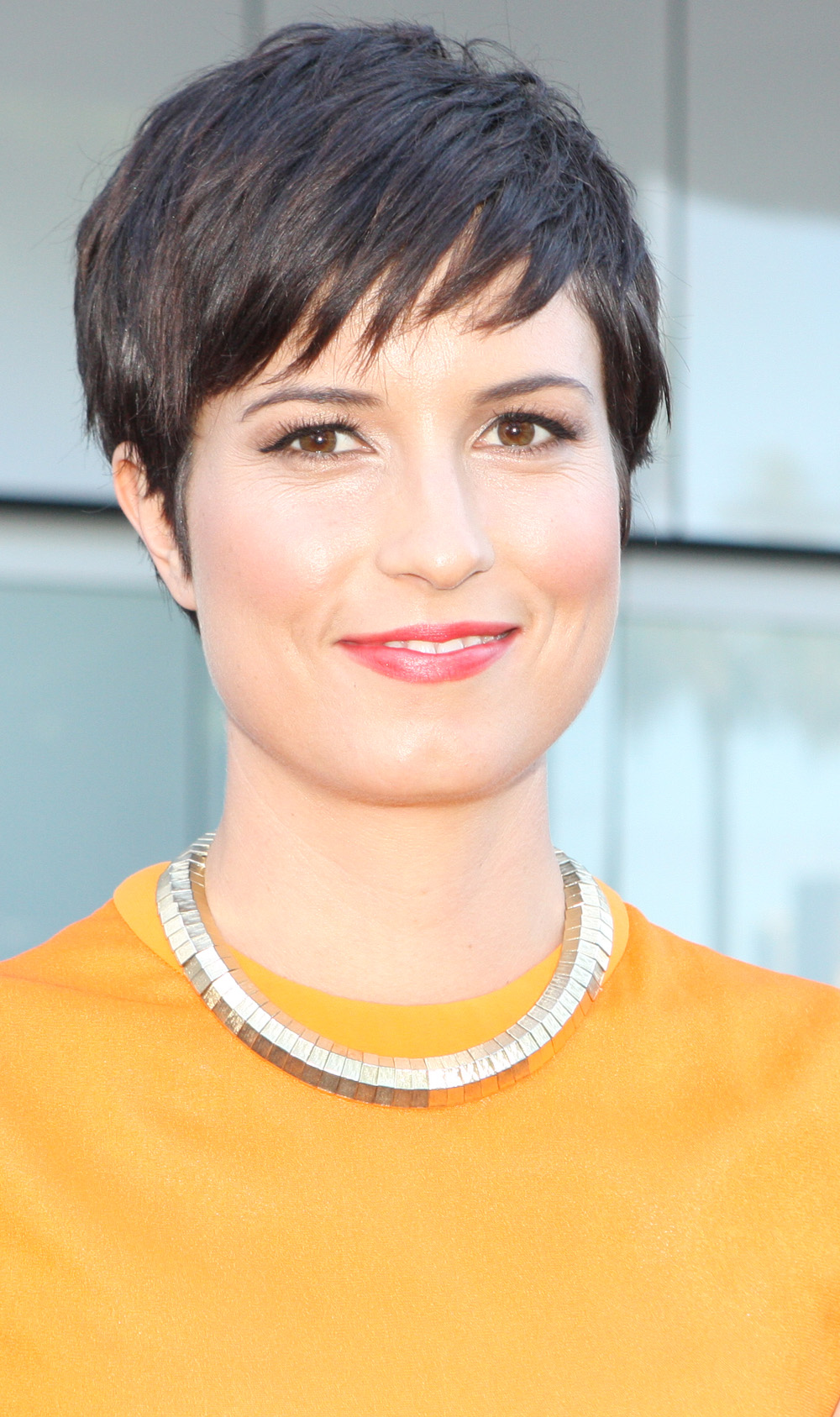
Higgins at the ARIA Awards ceremony, December 2013, Star Event Centre, Sydney

On 26 July 2025, "Scar" was voted to 4th place in Triple J's Hottest 100 of Australian Songs.

=== APRA Awards ===
The APRA Awards are presented annually from 1982 by the Australasian Performing Right Association (APRA). Higgins has won two awards from twelve nominations.

Year	Nominee / work	Award	Result
2005	"Scar" (Missy Higgins, Kevin Griffin) – Missy Higgins	Song of the Year	Won
2005	"Ten Days" (Missy Higgins, Jay Clifford) – Missy Higgins	Song of the Year	Nominated
2005	Missy Higgins	Breakthrough Award	Won
2006	"The Special Two" (Missy Higgins) – Missy Higgins	Song of the Year	Nominated
2006	"The Special Two" (Missy Higgins) – Missy Higgins	Most Performed Australian Work	Nominated
2006	"Ten Days" (Missy Higgins, Jay Clifford)	Most Performed Australian Work	Nominated
2013	"Everyone's Waiting" (Missy Higgins and Daniel Wilson)	Song of the Year	Shortlisted
2013	"Set Me On Fire" (Missy Higgins, Butterfly Boucher and Daniel Wilson)	Song of the Year	Shortlisted
2017	"Oh Canada"	Song of the Year	Shortlisted
2020	"Carry You" (Tim Minchin) – Missy Higgins	Best Original Song Composed for the Screen	Nominated
2020	"Edge of Something" (Higgins, Antony Partos, Matteo Zingales) – Missy Higgins	Best Original Song Composed for the Screen	Nominated
2020	"Arrows"	Song of the Year	Shortlisted
2021	"Carry You" (Tim Minchin) – Missy Higgins	Song of the Year	Nominated
2022	"Bloody Game" from Total Control	Best Original Song Composed for the Screen	Nominated
2023	"Edge of Something"	Song of the Year	Shortlisted
2025	"The Second Act"	Song of the Year	Nominated
2025	"The Second Act"	Most Performed Alternative Work	Nominated

=== ARIA Awards ===
The ARIA Music Awards are presented annually from 1987 by the Australian Recording Industry Association (ARIA). Higgins has won eleven awards, including a hall of fame induction.

Year	Nominee / work	Award	Result
2004	"Scar"	Single of the Year	Nominated
2004	"Scar"	Best Female Artist	Nominated
2004	"Scar"	Breakthrough Artist – Single	Nominated
2004	"Scar"	Best Pop Release	Won
2004	"Scar" – Squareyed Films	Best Video	Nominated
2005	The Sound of White	Album of the Year	Won
2005	The Sound of White	Best Female Artist	Won
2005	The Sound of White	Highest Selling Album	Won
2005	The Sound of White	Breakthrough Artist – Album	Won
2005	The Sound of White	Best Pop Release	Won
2005	The Sound of White – Cathie Glassby	Best Cover Art	Nominated
2005	"The Special Two"	Single of the Year	Nominated
2005	"The Special Two"	Highest Selling Single	Nominated
2006	If You Tell Me Yours, I'll Tell You Mine	Best Music DVD	Nominated
2007	On a Clear Night	Best Female Artist	Won
2007	On a Clear Night	Best Pop Release	Nominated
2007	On a Clear Night	Highest Selling Album	Nominated
2007	"Steer"	Highest Selling Single	Nominated
2008	"Peachy"	Best Female Artist	Nominated
2012	The Ol' Razzle Dazzle	Best Female Artist	Nominated
2012	The Ol' Razzle Dazzle	Album of the Year	Nominated
2012	The Ol' Razzle Dazzle	Best Adult Contemporary Album	Won
2012	"Everyone's Waiting" – Natasha Pincus	Best Video	Won
2013	"Set Me on Fire"	Best Female Artist	Nominated
2018	Solastalgia	Best Adult Contemporary Album	Nominated
2022	Total Control	Best Adult Contemporary Album	Nominated
2024	The Second Act Tour 2024	Best Australian Live Act	Won
2024	Herself	Hall of Fame	inducted
2025	The Second Act	Album of the Year	Nominated
2025	The Second Act	Best Solo Artist	Nominated
2025	The Second Act	Best Adult Contemporary Album	Won
2025	Best Video	Claudia Sangiorgi Dalimore for Missy Higgins – "Craters"	Nominated

=== Australian Women in Music Awards ===
The Australian Women in Music Awards is an annual event that celebrates outstanding women in the Australian Music Industry who have made significant and lasting contributions in their chosen field. They commenced in 2018.

Year	Nominee / work	Award	Result
2025	Missy Higgins	Songwriter Award	Won
2025	Missy Higgins	Artistic Excellence Award	Nominated

=== EG Awards / Music Victoria Awards ===
The EG Awards (known as Music Victoria Awards since 2013) are an annual awards night celebrating Victorian music. They commenced in 2006.

Year	Nominee / work	Award	Result
2007	Missy Higgins	Best Female	Won
2014	Missy Higgins	Best Female	Nominated

=== Helpmann Awards ===
The Helpmann Awards is an awards show, celebrating live entertainment and performing arts in Australia, presented by industry group Live Performance Australia since 2001. Note: 2020 and 2021 were cancelled due to the COVID-19 pandemic.

Year	Nominee / work	Award	Result	Ref.
2005	Missy Higgins	Best Performance in an Australian Contemporary Concert	Nominated	
2005	Missy Higgins	Best Australian Contemporary Concert	Nominated	
2017	Missy Higgins Orchestral Concert Series 2016	Best Australian Contemporary Concert	Nominated	

=== J Awards ===
The J Awards are an annual series of Australian music awards that were established by the Australian Broadcasting Corporation's youth-focused radio station Triple J. They commenced in 2005.

Year	Nominee / work	Award	Result	Ref.
2024	Missy Higgins	Double J Artist of the Year	Won	

=== MTV Australia Video Music Award ===
The MTV Australia Video Music Award were presented annually from 2005 to 2009 by MTV Australia.

Year	Nominee / work	Award	Result
2005	Missy Higgins	Best Female	Nominated
2005	Missy Higgins	Best Breakthrough	Won
2005	Missy Higgins	Supernova Award	Nominated
2006	"The Special Two" Missy Higgins	Best Female Artist	Nominated

=== Melbourne Prize for Music ===
The Melbourne Prize for Music is a financial prize, founded in 2004 by Simon H. Warrender, and awarded to music every three years.

Year	Nominee / work	Award	Result	Ref.
2022	Missy Higgins	Melbourne Prize Trust	awarded	

=== Rolling Stone Australia Awards ===
The Rolling Stone Australia Awards are awarded annually in January or February by the Australian edition of Rolling Stone magazine for outstanding contributions to popular culture in the previous year.

Year	Nominee / work	Award	Result	Ref.
2025	The Second Act	Best LP/EP	Shortlisted	
2025	Missy Higgins	Best Live Act	Shortlisted	
