= Eleven: A Music Company =

Australian record label

- Founded: 11 November 2000
- Founder: John Watson
- Distributor(s): Universal Music, EMI
- Genre: Various
- Country of origin: Australia
- Location: Sydney
- Official website: elevenmusic.com

Eleven: A Music Company is an Australian record label and management company known for its small but successful roster, currently including Birds of Tokyo, Cold Chisel, Dustin Tebbutt, Gotye, Midnight Oil, Missy Higgins, Paul Mac, Peter Garrett, The Presets, and Silverchair. The company was founded on 11 November 2000 by artist manager, John Watson.

== History ==
John Watson grew up in Townsville, Queensland. He worked in independent record stores there while still in high school, then left Townsville for Sydney with local indie band The Spliffs in 1986. In the late 1980s Watson worked as a freelance music journalist while completing an honours degree in politics at the University of New South Wales. He also managed The Spliffs and The Whippersnappers. In 1990 he was hired by MDS (a division of Mushroom Records) to open their Sydney office. In 1991, he became the Sydney-based Artist and Repertoire manager for Sony Music Australia and later also became the company's Director of International Marketing.

In 1994, the young rock trio Silverchair came to Watson's attention. After being jointly responsible for signing the band to the new Murmur imprint, he left Sony and became Silverchair's manager via the newly founded John Watson Management. Under Watson's guidance, Silverchair had immediate worldwide commercial success and have since gone on to sell more than 6 million records, and achieve five No. 1 albums in Australia.

When Silverchair's deal with Sony ended in 2000, Watson formed Eleven: A Music Company to release their works. He also signed several other successful Australian artists to the label, including Missy Higgins, Paul Mac, Kisschasy, The Dissociatives and Little Birdy. John Watson Management represents all artists signed to Eleven: A Music Company.

John Watson Management also represents some Australian artists who are not signed to the Eleven label: Birds of Tokyo and Cold Chisel (who is co-managed with John O'Donnell). The company also managed Wolfmother from 2005 until standing down from that role six months before the release of that band's second album in 2009.

Eleven took its name from the amplifier in the cult comedy movie This Is Spinal Tap. Like that amplifier the label "seeks to go one step further in its efforts on behalf of its artists".

Eleven's releases were originally distributed in Australia, New Zealand, and Asia (except Japan) by Virgin/EMI. In the rest of the world, however, the label is of independent status and some of its artists are signed to different labels in other territories.

In July 2008, Watson announced that Eleven would be leaving EMI and joining Universal on 11 September 2008. The new deal allows Eleven and its artists to have total control over marketing and promotion and to more closely link the marketing and promotion of recordings and tours. In a statement, Watson said "Instead of the traditional approach of having one group of people trying to sell CDs while others try to sell concert tickets, artists need to be in the broader business of building enduring relationships with their audiences in all the different forms that may take. Universal Music truly understands all this, so our new deal will allow us to integrate those processes much more seamlessly."

In June 2015, iconic Australian dance duo The Presets signed a management deal with Eleven. Eleven also signed on to manage both Midnight Oil and Peter Garrett's solo career in 2015, and in 2017 re-launched the band's music career with The Great Circle World Tour – spanning over 70 dates and selling in excess of 400,000 tickets.

== Artist roster ==
- Birds of Tokyo
- Cold Chisel
- Dustin Tebbutt
- Gotye
- Midnight Oil
- Missy Higgins
- Paul Mac
- Peter Garrett
- The Presets
- Silverchair

Inactive / Previous

- Daniel Johns
- The Dissociatives
- Itch-E and Scratch-E
- Katy Steele
- Kisschasy
- Little Birdy
- Pete Murray
- Wolfmother

== See also ==
- List of record labels
