= Triple J's Hottest 100 Australian Albums of All Time =

Radio list

Australian Albums Triple J Hottest 100

Countdown details
- Date of countdown: 28 June – 10 July 2011

Countdown highlights
- Winning song: Powderfinger – "Odyssey Number Five"
- Most entries: Silverchair; Bernard Fanning (5 albums)

Chronology
← Previous; 2010	Next → 2011

The Hottest 100 Australian Albums of All Time is a listener-voted countdown of albums run by Australian radio station Triple J in June and July 2011. In May 2011, Triple J music director Richard Kingsmill announced that the station would be conducting another special Triple J Hottest 100 listener-voted poll the following month, counting down the best 100 albums by Australian artists.

Voting began on 6 June, and concluded on the evening of 26 June. The countdown was carried out over two weeks, starting on 28 June 2011, and finishing at 5pm on 10 July, with Brisbane band Powderfinger's 2000 album, Odyssey Number Five (which contained two Hottest 100–winning tracks: "These Days" in 1999 and "My Happiness" in 2000), announced at No. 1.

During the countdown, selected tracks were played from selected albums, with some other albums being aired in full, including each of the albums to make the top twenty.

== List ==
#	Artist	Album	Year of release	Triple J Album Poll position	Tracks in the Hottest 100	Tracks in the Hottest 100 of all time
1	Powderfinger	Odyssey Number Five	2000	2	These Days – #1 of 1999 My Happiness – #1 of 2000 My Kind of Scene – #3 of 2000	These Days – #21 of 2009 My Happiness – #27 of 2009
2	Silverchair	Frogstomp	1995		Tomorrow – #5 of 1994	Tomorrow – #59 of 1998 and #33 of 2009
3	AC/DC	Back in Black	1980			Back in Black – #91 of 2009
4	The Living End	The Living End	1998	1	Prisoner of Society – #15 of 1997 Save the Day – #10 of 1998 Second Solution – #15 of 1998 All Torn Down – #41 of 1999 West End Riot – #48 of 1999	Prisoner of Society – #18 of 1998 and #34 of 2009
5	INXS	Kick	1987			
6	Powderfinger	Internationalist	1998	2	The Day You Come – #8 of 1998 Don't Wanna Be Left Out – #46 of 1998 Already Gone – #25 of 1999 Good-Day Ray – #68 of 1999 Passenger – #100 of 1999	
7	The Presets	Apocalypso	2008	2	My People – #18 of 2007 Talk Like That – #6 of 2008 This Boy's in Love – #8 of 2008 Yippiyo-Ay – #56 of 2008	
8	Wolfmother	Wolfmother	2005	1	Woman – #45 of 2004 Mind's Eye – #6 of 2005 Joker & the Thief – #9 of 2005 Apple Tree – #16 of 2005 Dimension – #37 of 2005 Colossal – #39 of 2005 White Unicorn – #84 of 2005 Love Train (Note: Love Train only appeared on the International Version of Wolfmother.) – #80 of 2006	
9	The Avalanches	Since I Left You	2000	6	Frontier Psychiatrist – #6 of 2000 Since I Left You – #8 of 2001 Radio – #76 of 2001	
10	Regurgitator	Unit	1997	2	Everyday Formula – #19 of 1997 ! (The Song Formerly Known As) – #6 of 1998 Polyester Girl – #26 of 1998 Black Bugs – #32 of 1998	
11	Gotye	Like Drawing Blood	2006	1	Hearts a Mess – #8 of 2006 Learnalilgivinanlovin – #94 of 2006	Hearts a Mess – #77 of 2009
12	Grinspoon	Guide to Better Living	1997	4	Sickfest (Note: Originally released as part of the Green EP in 1995.) – #74 of 1995 DC×3 – #34 of 1997 Repeat – #63 of 1997 Just Ace – #18 of 1998 Don't Go Away – #79 of 1998	Just Ace – #88 of 1998
13	Crowded House	Crowded House	1986			Don't Dream It's Over – #76 of 1998 and #50 of 2009
14	Powderfinger	Vulture Street	2003	1	(Baby I've Got You) On My Mind – #4 of 2003 Sunsets – #7 of 2003 Love Your Way – #10 of 2003 Rockin' Rocks – #76 of 2003 Stumblin' – #77 of 2003	
15	Jebediah	Slightly Odway	1997	5	Leaving Home – #10 of 1997 Military Strongmen – #33 of 1997 Harpoon – #7 of 1998 Teflon – #42 of 1998 Benedict – #91 of 1998	Leaving Home – #50 of 1998 Jerks of Attention – #82 of 1998
16	Hilltop Hoods	The Hard Road	2006	10	The Hard Road – #3 of 2006 Clown Prince – #23 of 2006 What a Great Night – #41 of 2006 Stopping All Stations – #56 of 2006 Recapturing The Vibe – #77 of 2006	
17	The Whitlams	Eternal Nightcap	1997	3	No Aphrodisiac – #1 in 1997 You Sound Like Louis Burdett – #53 of 1997 Buy Now Pay Later (Charlie No. 2) – #37 of 1998 Melbourne – #43 of 1998 Charlie No. 3 – #56 of 1998	No Aphrodisiac – #36 of 1998 You Sound Like Louis Burdett – #43 of 1998
18	Crowded House	Woodface	1991			
19	Tame Impala	Innerspeaker	2010	2	Solitude is Bliss – #33 of 2010 Lucidity – #74 of 2010	
20	The Temper Trap	Conditions	2009	2	Fader – #21 of 2009 Science of Fear – #48 of 2009 Love Lost – #58 of 2009	
21	Midnight Oil	10, 9, 8, 7, 6, 5, 4, 3, 2, 1	1982			Power and the Passion – #88 of 1989
22	Silverchair	Diorama	2002	1	The Greatest View – #10 of 2002 Without You – #25 of 2002 Luv Your Life – #35 of 2002 Across the Night – #62 of 2002 World Upon Your Shoulders – #76 of 2002	
23	Hilltop Hoods	The Calling	2003		The Nosebleed Section – #9 of 2003 Dumb Enough – #44 of 2003	The Nosebleed Section – #17 of 2009
24	John Butler Trio	Sunrise Over Sea	2004	2	Zebra – #8 of 2003 Treat Yo Mama – #25 of 2004 What You Want – #51 of 2004 Hello – #93 of 2004	
25	Jet	Get Born	2003	4	Are You Gonna Be My Girl – #1 of 2003 Rollover DJ – #19 of 2003 Look What You've Done – #24 of 2004 Get What You Need – #89 of 2004	
26	You Am I	Hourly, Daily	1996		Soldiers – #80 of 1996 Good Mornin' – #84 of 1996	
27	Silverchair	Neon Ballroom	1999	4	Ana's Song (Open Fire) – #15 of 1999 Anthem for the Year 2000 – #29 of 1999 Miss You Love – #30 of 1999 Emotion Sickness – #43 of 1999 Paint Pastel Princess – #96 of 2000	
28	The Cat Empire	The Cat Empire	2003		Hello – #6 of 2003 Days Like These – #37 of 2003 The Chariot – #100 of 2003	
29	Missy Higgins	The Sound of White	2004	3	Scar – #2 of 2004 Ten Days – #6 of 2004 Casualty – #49 of 2004 The Special Two – #31 of 2005 The Sound of White – #74 of 2005	
30	Karnivool	Themata	2005		Themata – #97 of 2005 Roquefort (Note: The single version (with additional horns by Empire Horns) was the version that polled here.) – #45 of 2006	
31	Angus & Julia Stone	Down the Way	2010	3	And The Boys – #40 of 2009 Big Jet Plane – #1 of 2010 Hold On – #62 of 2010	
32	Birds of Tokyo	Universes	2008	5	Broken Bones – #20 of 2008 Silhouettic – #22 of 2008 Wild Eyed Boy – #51 of 2008	
33	Midnight Oil	Diesel and Dust	1987			Beds Are Burning – #97 of 2009
34	Josh Pyke	Memories & Dust	2007	6	Middle of the Hill (Note: Originally released as part of the Feeding the Wolves EP in 2005.) – #19 of 2005 Memories & Dust – #38 of 2006 Lines on Palms – #79 of 2007 Sew My Name – #91 of 2007 Forever Song – #97 of 2007	
35	You Am I	Hi Fi Way	1995		Purple Sneakers – #24 of 1995 Cathy's Clown – #84 of 1995 Jewels and Bullets – #94 of 1995	
36	Cut Copy	In Ghost Colours	2008	6	Hearts on Fire – #39 of 2007 Lights & Music – #15 of 2008	
37	The Vines	Highly Evolved	2002	2	Get Free – #5 of 2002 Highly Evolved – #19 of 2002 Outtathaway! – #21 of 2002	
38	Angus & Julia Stone	A Book Like This	2007		Wasted – #31 of 2007 The Beast – #45 of 2007	
39	Birds of Tokyo	Birds of Tokyo	2010	12	Plans – #4 of 2010 Wild at Heart – #47 of 2010 The Saddest Thing I Know – #87 of 2010	
40	Something for Kate	Echolalia	2001	1	Monsters – #2 of 2001 Three Dimensions – #13 of 2001 Twenty Years – #37 of 2001 Say Something – #63 of 2002	
41	Powderfinger	Double Allergic	1996		Pick You Up – #6 of 1996 D.A.F. – #18 of 1996 Living Type – #32 of 1996 JC – #66 of 1997	
42	Cold Chisel	East	1980			
43	Silverchair	Freak Show	1997	6	Freak – #13 of 1997 The Door – #27 of 1997	Abuse Me – #83 of 1998
44	Regurgitator	Tu-Plang	1996		Kong Foo Sing – #15 of 1996 I Sucked a Lot of Cock to Get Where I Am – #23 of 1996	
45	Karnivool	Sound Awake	2009	17	Set Fire to the Hive – #47 of 2009 All I Know – #63 of 2009	
46	Empire of the Sun	Walking on a Dream	2008	9	Walking on a Dream – #4 of 2008 We Are the People – #68 of 2008	
47	Eskimo Joe	Black Fingernails, Red Wine	2006		Black Fingernails, Red Wine – #2 of 2006 New York – #95 of 2006	
48	Spiderbait	Ivy and the Big Apples	1996		Buy Me a Pony – #1 of 1996 Calypso – #23 of 1997	Buy Me a Pony – #86 of 1998
49	John Farnham	Whispering Jack	1986			
50	Cog	The New Normal	2005		My Enemy – #32 of 2005 Run – #71 of 2005	
51	Washington	I Believe You Liar	2010	7	Cement (Note: Originally released as part of the How to Tame Lions EP in 2009.) – #67 of 2009 Sunday Best – #20 of 2010 Rich Kids – #59 of 2010 The Hardest Part – #84 of 2010	
52	Nick Cave and the Bad Seeds	Murder Ballads	1996		Where the Wild Roses Grow – #8 of 1995	
53	John Butler Trio	Three	2001	5	Betterman – #5 of 2001 Take – #29 of 2001	Betterman – #47 of 2009
54	Bernard Fanning	Tea & Sympathy	2005	4	Wish You Well – #1 of 2005 Songbird – #14 of 2005	
55	Midnight Oil	Blue Sky Mining	1990			
56	Cloud Control	Bliss Release	2010	5	There's Nothing in the Water We Can't Fight – #18 of 2010	
57	The Cruel Sea	The Honeymoon Is Over	1993		The Honeymoon Is Over – #9 of 1993 Black Stick – #21 of 1993 Delivery Man – #95 of 1993	
58	Grinspoon	New Detention	2002	6	Chemical Heart – #2 of 2002 Lost Control – #14 of 2002 No Reason – #15 of 2002 1000 Miles – #47 of 2002	
59	Sarah Blasko	As Day Follows Night	2009	6	We Won't Run – #28 of 2009 All I Want – #29 of 2009	
60	Sia	We Are Born	2010	15	You've Changed – #72 of 2009 Clap Your Hands – #13 of 2010 Bring Night – #56 of 2010	
61	Pendulum	Hold Your Colour	2005		Tarantula – #88 of 2006	
62	The Panics	Cruel Guards	2007		Don't Fight It – #10 of 2007	
63	John Butler Trio	Grand National	2007	1	Funky Tonight – #12 of 2006 Better Than – #4 of 2007 Used to Get High – #22 of 2007 Good Excuse – #55 of 2007	
64	George	Polyserena	2002	4	Bastard Son (Note: Originally released as part of the Bastard Son/Holiday EP in 2000.) – #20 of 2000 Spawn (Note: Originally released as part of the You Can Take What's Mine EP in 1999.) – #61 of 2000 Special Ones – #19 of 2001 Run – #92 of 2001 Release – #32 of 2002 Breaking It Slowly – #43 of 2002	
65	Cold Chisel	Cold Chisel	1978			Khe Sanh – #95 of 1989 and #94 of 1998
66	Bliss n Eso	Running on Air	2010		Addicted – #23 of 2010 Down by the River – #41 of 2010 Reflections – #53 of 2010	
67	Bliss n Eso	Flying Colours	2008		Eye of the Storm – #40 of 2008 The Sea Is Rising – #61 of 2008 Woodstock 2008 – #94 of 2008	
68	Art vs. Science	The Experiment	2011	9	Magic Fountain – #9 of 2010 Finally See Our Way – #90 of 2010 A.I.M. Fire! – #48 of 2011	
69	Paul Kelly and the Coloured Girls	Gossip	1986			
70	Silverchair	Young Modern	2007	5	Straight Lines – #2 of 2007 If You Keep Losing Sleep – #30 of 2007 Reflections of a Sound – #80 of 2007	
71	The Presets	Beams	2005			
72	Something for Kate	Beautiful Sharks	1999	3	Electricity – #44 of 1999 Whatever You Want – #70 of 1999 Hallways – #72 of 1999 Beautiful Sharks – #59 of 2000	
73	AC/DC	Highway to Hell	1979			
74	Sarah Blasko	The Overture & the Underscore	2004		Don't U Eva – #27 of 2004 Always Worth It – #65 of 2005	
75	Skyhooks	Living in the 70's	1974			
76	Hunters & Collectors	Human Frailty	1986			Throw Your Arms Around Me – #2 of 1989, #2 of 1990, #4 of 1991, #2 of 1998 and #23 of 2009 Say Goodbye – #97 of 1989 and #71 of 1990.
77	Pendulum	Immersion	2010		Witchcraft – #48 of 2010 Watercolour – #69 of 2010	
78	The Sleepy Jackson	Lovers	2003		Vampire Racecourse – #91 of 2003	
79	The Grates	Gravity Won't Get You High	2006	5	19-20-20 – #10 of 2006 Science Is Golden – #17 of 2006 Inside Outside – #42 of 2006 Lies are Much More Fun – #71 of 2006	
80	The Saints	(I'm) Stranded	1977			(I'm) Stranded – #51 of 1989
81	Pete Murray	Feeler	2003		Feeler – #20 of 2003 Lines – #86 of 2003	
82	The Waifs	Up All Night	2003		London Still – #3 of 2002 Highway One – #80 of 2002 Lighthouse – #12 of 2003 Fisherman's Daughter – #50 of 2003	
83	Lisa Mitchell	Wonder	2009	9	Neopolitan Dreams (Note: Originally released as part of the Welcome to the Afternoon EP in 2008.) – #91 of 2008 Coin Laundry – #7 of 2009	
84	The Go-Betweens	16 Lovers Lane	1988			
85	Hilltop Hoods	State of the Art	2009	13	Chase That Feeling – #3 of 2009 Still Standing – #37 of 2009	
86	Dead Letter Circus	This Is the Warning	2010		One Step – #65 of 2010 Big – #99 of 2010	
87	Eskimo Joe	A Song Is a City	2004	4	From the Sea – #3 of 2004 Older Than You – #32 of 2004 Smoke – #62 of 2004	
88	The Butterfly Effect	Imago	2006		Gone – #32 of 2006 A Slow Descent – #39 of 2006 Reach – #71 of 2007	
89	Pnau	Pnau	2007		Wild Strawberries – #100 of 2007 Embrace – #12 of 2008 Baby – #54 of 2008	
90	Children Collide	The Long Now	2008		Farewell Rocketship – #66 of 2008	
91	Gypsy & The Cat	Gilgamesh	2010		Jona Vark – #64 of 2010 The Piper's Song – #71 of 2010 Time to Wander – #73 of 2010	
92	Frenzal Rhomb	A Man's Not a Camel	1999		Never Had So Much Fun – #26 of 1999 You Are Not My Friend – #34 of 1999 We're Going Out Tonight – #64 of 1999	
93	Augie March	Moo, You Bloody Choir	2006	8	One Crowded Hour – #1 of 2006	One Crowded Hour – #59 of 2009
94	Paul Dempsey	Everything Is True	2009	8	Ramona Was a Waitress – #32 of 2009	
95	Hoodoo Gurus	Stoneage Romeos	1984			
96	Machine Gun Fellatio	Paging Mr. Strike	2002	9	The Girl of My Dreams (Is Giving Me Nightmares) – #30 of 2001 Rollercoaster – #6 of 2002 Pussy Town – #8 of 2002 Take It Slow – #59 of 2002	
97	The Butterfly Effect	Begins Here	2003		One Second of Insanity – #68 of 2003 Always – #99 of 2004	
98	Nick Cave and the Bad Seeds	The Boatman's Call	1997		Into My Arms – #18 of 1997	Into My Arms – #84 of 1998 and #36 of 2009
99	Grinspoon	Thrills, Kills & Sunday Pills	2004	7	Hard Act to Follow – #16 of 2004 Better Off Alone – #26 of 2004	
100	The Cat Empire	Two Shoes	2005		The Car Song – #25 of 2005 Sly – #38 of 2005 Two Shoes – #54 of 2005 Party Started – #100 of 2005	

=== #101–#200 List ===
On 21 August 2011, Richard Kingsmill published the #101–#200 list on his blog.

#	Artist	Album	Year of release	Triple J Album Poll position	Tracks in the Hottest 100	Tracks in the Hottest 100 of all time
101	Paul Kelly and The Coloured Girls	Under the Sun	1987			
102	Lior	Autumn Flow	2004		This Old Love – #42 of 2004 Autumn Flow – #43 of 2005	
103	Nick Cave and the Bad Seeds	Let Love In	1994		Do You Love Me? – #11 of 1994 Thirsty Dog – #86 of 1994	Red Right Hand – #96 of 1998
104	Frenzal Rhomb	Meet the Family	1997		Mum Changed the Locks – #54 of 1998 Mr. Charisma – #72 of 1998	
105	Icehouse	Man of Colours	1987			
106	Sarah Blasko	What the Sea Wants, the Sea Will Have	2006		Always On This Line – #58 of 2006 {Explain} – #79 of 2006	
107	Xavier Rudd	Solace	2004	8	Let Me Be – #54 of 2003 Shelter – #56 of 2004 Solace – #59 of 2004	
108	The Church	Starfish	1988			Under the Milky Way – #14 of 1990 and #31 of 1991 Reptile – #92 of 1990
109	Crowded House	Temple of Low Men	1988			
110	Cog	Sharing Space	2008		Bird of Feather – #31 of 2008 Are You Interested? – #97 of 2008	
111	Parkway Drive	Killing with a Smile	2005			
112	Augie March	Sunset Studies	2000	5	Asleep in Perfection – #61 of 1999 There Is No Such Place – #47 of 2001	
113	Grinspoon	Easy	1999		Ready 1 – #33 of 1999 Rock Show – #33 of 2000 Secrets – #73 of 2000	
114	Birds of Tokyo	Day One	2007		Wayside – #61 of 2007	
115	Josh Pyke	Chimney's Afire	2008	10	The Lighthouse Song – #27 of 2008 Make You Happy – #29 of 2008	
116	Radio Birdman	Radios Appear	1977			Aloha Steve and Danno – #23 of 1989, #54 of 1990 and #47 of 1991
117	The Living End	Roll On	2000		Pictures in the Mirror – #19 of 2000 Roll On – #72 of 2001	
118	The Amity Affliction	Youngbloods	2010			
119	The Whitlams	Love This City	1999	6	Chunky, Chunky Air Guitar – #38 of 1999 Thank You (for Loving Me at My Worst) – #54 of 1999 and #37 of 2000	
120	Eskimo Joe	Girl	2001	3	Wake Up – #25 of 2001 Planet Earth – #31 of 2001 Who Sold Her Out – #34 of 2001	
121	INXS	The Swing	1984			
122	AC/DC	T.N.T.	1975			
123	Alex Lloyd	Black the Sun	1999	1	Lucky Star – #21 of 1999	
124	Little Birdy	BigBigLove	2004	5	Relapse (Note: Originally released as part of the Little Birdy EP in 2003.) – #16 of 2003 Baby Blue (Note: Baby Blue only appeared as a bonus track on the Japanese edition of BigBigLove.) – #25 of 2003 Beautiful to Me – #8 of 2004 Tonight's the Night – #78 of 2004	
125	Cut Copy	Bright Like Neon Love	2004			
126	The Triffids	Born Sandy Devotional	1986			Wide Open Road – #68 of 1989, #49 of 1990 and #52 of 1991
127	Nick Cave and the Bad Seeds	Dig, Lazarus, Dig!!!	2008		Dig, Lazarus, Dig!!! – #35 of 2008	
128	Ben Lee	Awake Is the New Sleep	2005	9	Gamble Everything for Love – #15 of 2004 Catch My Disease – #2 of 2005 We're All In This Together – #53 of 2005 Into the Dark – #86 of 2005	
129	Parkway Drive	Horizons	2007			
130	Jebediah	Of Someday Shambles	1999		Animal – #19 of 1999 Feet Touch the Ground – #28 of 1999 Please Leave – #30 of 2000	
131	Gyroscope	Breed Obsession	2008		Snakeskin – #16 of 2007 1981 – #85 of 2008	
132	Gyroscope	Are You Involved?	2005		Fast Girl – #29 of 2005 Beware Wolf – #62 of 2005	
133	TISM	Machiavelli and the Four Seasons	1995		(He'll Never Be An) Ol' Man River – #9 of 1995 Greg! The Stop Sign!! – #10 of 1995 All Homeboys are Dickheads – #93 of 1995	
134	British India	Guillotine	2007		Tie Up My Hands – #46 of 2007 Run the Red Light – #74 of 2007	
135	Bag Raiders	Bag Raiders	2010		Shooting Stars – #18 of 2009 Way Back Home – #46 of 2010	
136	Ladyhawke	Ladyhawke	2008		My Delirium – #11 of 2008 Paris Is Burning – #26 of 2008	
137	Men at Work	Business as Usual	1981			
138	Drapht	The Life of Riley	2011		Rapunzel – #12 of 2010 Sing It (The Life of Riley) – #29 of 2011 Bali Party – #74 of 2011	
139	Midnight Juggernauts	Dystopia	2007	9	Into the Galaxy – #57 of 2007 Tombstone – #86 of 2007	
140	Australian Crawl	The Boys Light Up	1980			
141	Something for Kate	Elsewhere for 8 Minutes	1997		Captain (Million Miles an Hour) – #39 of 1997	
142	The Beautiful Girls	Learn Yourself	2003		Blackbird – #41 of 2003 Music – #62 of 2003	
143	Hunters & Collectors	Hunters & Collectors	1982			Talking to a Stranger – #8 of 1989, #32 of 1990 and #45 of 1991
144	You Am I	Sound as Ever	1993		Adam's Ribs – #50 of 1993 Berlin Chair – #23 of 1994 Jaimme's Got a Gal – #77 of 1994	Berlin Chair – #61 of 1998 and #52 of 2009
145	Bertie Blackman	Secrets and Lies	2009	18	Byrds of Prey – #71 of 2009 Thump – #93 of 2009	
146	Baby Animals	Baby Animals	1991			
147	INXS	Listen Like Thieves	1985			
148	The Drones	Wait Long by the River and the Bodies of Your Enemies Will Float By	2005			
149	John Butler Trio	April Uprising	2010		One Way Road – #39 of 2009 Revolution – #39 of 2010	
150	The Superjesus	Sumo	1998	6	Down Again – #14 of 1997 Now and Then – #83 of 1998 Saturation – #99 of 1998	
151	Gyroscope	Sound Shattering Sound	2004		Doctor Doctor – #92 of 2003 Safe Forever – #97 of 2004	
152	Little Red	Midnight Remember	2010	18	Rock It – #2 of 2010 Slow Motion – #79 of 2010	
153	Children Collide	Theory of Everything	2010	19	Jellylegs – #22 of 2010 My Eagle – #60 of 2010	
154	Sia	Some People Have Real Problems	2008			
155	Machine Gun Fellatio	Bring It On!	2000		Mutha Fukka on a Motorcycle – #59 of 1999 and #67 of 2000 Unsent Letter – #16 of 2000	
156	Little Red	Listen to Little Red	2008		Coca Cola – #47 of 2008	
157	The Living End	State of Emergency	2006		What's on Your Radio – #49 of 2005 Wake Up – #53 of 2006	
158	Hoodoo Gurus	Mars Needs Guitars!	1985			
159	Crowded House	Together Alone	1993		Distant Sun – #60 of 1993	
160	Butterfingers	Breakfast at Fatboys	2004		I Love Work – #15 of 2003 Everytime – #38 of 2003 Yo Mama – #17 of 2004	
161	Sunnyboys	Sunnyboys	1981			Alone with You – #56 of 1989
162	Eddy Current Suppression Ring	Primary Colours	2008			
163	Parkway Drive	Deep Blue	2010		Sleepwalker – #97 of 2010	
164	Nick Cave and the Bad Seeds	Abattoir Blues / The Lyre of Orpheus	2004			
165	The Cat Empire	So Many Nights	2007		So Many Nights – #50 of 2007 No Longer There – #62 of 2007	
166	Miami Horror	Illumination	2010		Sometimes – #82 of 2009 Holidays – #54 of 2010	
167	Motor Ace	Five Star Laundry	2001	9	American Shoes – #65 of 2000 Death Defy – #98 of 2000 Hey Driver – #53 of 2001	
168	Ratcat	Blind Love	1991			That Ain't Bad – #41 of 1991
169	Geoffrey Gurrumul Yunupingu	Gurrumul	2008			
170	Hunters & Collectors	Cut	1992		Holy Grail – #54 of 1993	Holy Grail – #68 of 1998
171	Faker	Addicted Romantic	2005		Hurricane – #21 of 2005	
172	Ben Lee	Breathing Tornados	1998		Cigarettes Will Kill You – #2 of 1998 Nothing Much Happens – #81 of 1999	
173	British India	Thieves	2008		I Said I'm Sorry – #37 of 2008	
174	Cold Chisel	Circus Animals	1982			
175	Killing Heidi	Reflector	2000		Weir – #2 of 1999 Mascara – #14 of 1999 Superman/Supergirl – #70 of 2000 Live Without It – #92 of 2000	
176	AC/DC	High Voltage	1976			
177	Nick Cave and the Bad Seeds	No More Shall We Part	2001		Fifteen Feet of Pure White Snow – #51 of 2001	
178	Hungry Kids of Hungary	Escapades	2010	20	Coming Around – #75 of 2010	
179	I Killed the Prom Queen	Music for the Recently Deceased	2006			
180	The Drones	Havilah	2008			
181	INXS	Shabooh Shoobah	1982			
182	Spiderbait	The Unfinished Spanish Galleon of Finley Lake	1995		Monty – #43 of 1995	
183	AC/DC	Dirty Deeds Done Dirt Cheap	1976			
184	Kisschasy	United Paper People	2005		Do-Do's & Whoa-Oh's – #22 of 2005 Face Without a Name – #95 of 2005	
185	Jimmy Barnes	For the Working Class Man	1985			
186	Midnight Oil	Red Sails in the Sunset	1984			
187	Pendulum	In Silico	2008		Propane Nightmares – #92 of 2008	
188	The Middle East	I Want That You Are Always Happy	2011			
189	Powderfinger	Dream Days at the Hotel Existence	2007		Lost and Running – #15 of 2007 I Don't Remember – #66 of 2007	
190	The Butterfly Effect	Final Conversation of Kings	2008		Window and the Watcher – #53 of 2008	
191	Sia	Colour the Small One	2004		Breathe Me – #87 of 2004	
192	Architecture in Helsinki	Places Like This	2007		Heart it Races – #19 of 2007 Hold Music – #36 of 2007	
193	Sparkadia	Postcards	2008		Jealousy – #79 of 2008	
194	Something for Kate	The Official Fiction	2003	6	Déjà Vu – #11 of 2003 Song for a Sleepwalker – #63 of 2003	
195	The Mark of Cain	Ill at Ease	1995			
196	Bob Evans	Suburban Songbook	2006		Nowhere Without You – #36 of 2006 Don't You Think It's Time? – #37 of 2006	
197	Missy Higgins	On a Clear Night	2007		Peachy – #51 of 2007 Steer – #53	
198	The Getaway Plan	Other Voices, Other Rooms	2008		Where the City Meets the Sea – #59 of 2008	
199	Powderfinger	Golden Rule	2009		All of the Dreamers – #49 of 2009	
200	The Grates	Teeth Lost, Hearts Won	2008	8	Burn Bridges – #34 of 2008 Aw Yeah – #80 of 2008 Carve Your Name – #83 of 2008	

== Statistics ==
=== Artists with multiple entries ===
#	Artist	Entries
5	Bernard Fanning (Note: Once solo (54), four times with Powderfinger (1, 6, 14, 41))	1, 6, 14, 41, 54
5	Silverchair	2, 22, 27, 43, 70
4	Powderfinger	1, 6, 14, 41
4	Ian Kenny (Note: Twice with Birds of Tokyo (32, 39), twice with Karnivool (30, 45))	30, 32, 39, 45
3	Grinspoon	12, 58, 99
3	Hilltop Hoods	16, 23, 85
3	Midnight Oil	21, 33, 55
3	John Butler Trio	24, 53, 63
3	Paul Dempsey (Note: Once solo (94), twice with Something for Kate (40, 72))	40, 72, 94
2	AC/DC	3, 73
2	The Presets	7, 71
2	Regurgitator	10, 44
2	Crowded House	13, 18
2	You Am I	26, 35
2	The Cat Empire	28, 100
2	Karnivool	30, 45
2	Angus & Julia Stone	31, 38
2	Birds of Tokyo	32, 39
2	Something for Kate	40, 72
2	Cold Chisel	42, 65
2	Luke Steele (Note: Once with The Sleepy Jackson (78), once with Empire of the Sun (46))	46, 78
2	Nick Littlemore (Note: Once with Pnau (89) and once with Empire of the Sun (46))	46, 89
2	Eskimo Joe	47, 87
2	Nick Cave and the Bad Seeds	52, 98
2	Sarah Blasko	59, 74
2	Pendulum	61, 77
2	Bliss n Eso	66, 67
2	The Butterfly Effect	88, 97

=== Albums by decade ===
Decade	Song Count
1970s	4
1980s	11
1990s	21
2000s	53
2010s	11

== CD release ==
The CD release for the Triple J's Hottest 100 Australian Albums Of All Time was released on 5 August 2011.

=== Disc one ===
No.	Title	Artists	Length
1.	"My Happiness" (Odyssey Number Five)	Powderfinger	4:37
2.	"Read About It" (10, 9, 8, 7, 6, 5, 4, 3, 2, 1)	Midnight Oil	3:53
3.	"Alter Ego" (Innerspeaker)	Tame Impala	4:47
4.	"You've Changed" (We Are Born)	Sia	3:09
5.	"This Boy's in Love" (Apocalypso)	The Presets	4:08
6.	"Sweet Disposition" (Conditions)	The Temper Trap	3:52
7.	"Soldiers" (Hourly, Daily)	You Am I	2:29
8.	"Shutterspeed" (Themata)	Karnivool	3:44
9.	"Frontier Psychiatrist" (Since I Left You)	The Avalanches	4:49
10.	"All I Want" (As Day Follows Night)	Sarah Blasko	3:53
11.	"Never Tear Us Apart" (Kick)	INXS	3:04
12.	"Where the Wild Roses Grow" (Murder Ballads)	Nick Cave & The Bad Seeds and Kylie Minogue	3:55
13.	"The Hard Road" (The Hard Road)	Hilltop Hoods	4:06
14.	"Learnalilgivinanlovin" (Like Drawing Blood)	Gotye	2:47
15.	"! (The Song Formerly Known As)" (Unit)	Regurgitator	3:26
16.	"Take It or Leave It" (Get Born)	Jet	2:22
17.	"(I'm) Stranded" ((I'm) Stranded)	The Saints	3:28
18.	"Rich Kids" (I Believe You Liar)	Washington	3:00
19.	"The Girl Of My Dreams (Is Giving Me Nightmares)" (Paging Mr. Strike)	Machine Gun Fellatio	3:30
20.	"Memories & Dust" (Memories & Dust)	Josh Pyke	3:05
21.	"We Are the People" (Walking on a Dream)	Empire of the Sun	4:31
Total length:			72:42

=== Disc two ===
No.	Title	Artists	Length
1.	"Pure Massacre" (Frogstomp)	Silverchair	4:30
2.	"Joker & the Thief" (Wolfmother)	Wolfmother	4:38
3.	"Hearts on Fire" (In Ghost Colours)	Cut Copy	3:52
4.	"Streets of Your Town" (16 Lovers Lane)	The Go-Betweens	3:31
5.	"Gold Canary" (Bliss Release)	Cloud Control	3:51
6.	"The Sea Is Rising" (Flying Colours)	Bliss n Eso	4:17
7.	"This Is How It Goes" (The Sound of White)	Missy Higgins	3:27
8.	"Zebra" (Sunrise Over Sea)	The John Butler Trio	3:55
9.	"Say Goodbye" (Hunters & Collectors)	Hunters & Collectors	3:50
10.	"A.I.M. Fire!" (The Experiment)	Art vs. Science	3:57
11.	"Buy Me a Pony" (Ivy and the Big Apples)	Spiderbait	1:41
12.	"Get Free" (Highly Evolved)	The Vines	2:04
13.	"Black Fingernails, Red Wine" (Black Fingernails, Red Wine)	Eskimo Joe	4:08
14.	"Release" (Polyserena)	George	3:40
15.	"Watercolour" (Immersion)	Pendulum	3:26
16.	"Living in the 70's" (Living in the 70's)	Skyhooks	3:41
17.	"Social Currency" (The Long Now)	Children Collide	3:53
18.	"Monsters" (Echolalia)	Something For Kate	3:36
19.	"Don't Dream It's Over" (Crowded House)	Crowded House	3:55
20.	"London Still" (Up All Night)	The Waifs	3:41
21.	"Run" (The New Normal)	Cog	3:50
Total length:			77:12

=== Disc three ===
No.	Title	Artists	Length
1.	"Second Solution" (The Living End)	The Living End	2:59
2.	"19-20-20" (Gravity Won't Get You High)	The Grates	2:03
3.	"Hello" (The Cat Empire)	The Cat Empire	3:43
4.	"Baby" (Pnau)	Pnau	2:47
5.	"Cheap Wine" (East)	Cold Chisel	3:23
6.	"Don't Fight It" (Cruel Guards)	The Panics	5:00
7.	"Big" (This Is the Warning)	Dead Letter Circus	3:40
8.	"DC X 3" (Guide to Better Living)	Grinspoon	2:53
9.	"Black Stick" (The Honeymoon Is Over)	The Cruel Sea	4:58
10.	"Good Dancers" (Lovers)	The Sleepy Jackson	4:10
11.	"And the Boys" (Down the Way)	Angus & Julia Stone	4:09
12.	"No Aphrodisiac" (Eternal Nightcap)	The Whitlams	4:18
13.	"The Piper's Song" (Gilgamesh)	Gypsy & The Cat	3:40
14.	"I Want You Back" (Stoneage Romeos)	Hoodoo Gurus	3:10
15.	"Never Had So Much Fun" (A Man's Not a Camel)	Frenzal Rhomb	1:59
16.	"Silhouettic" (Universes)	Birds of Tokyo	3:23
17.	"Oh! Hark!" (Wonder)	Lisa Mitchell	4:29
18.	"The Cold Acre" (Moo, You Bloody Choir)	Augie March	5:33
19.	"Leaps and Bounds" (Gossip)	Paul Kelly & the Coloured Girls	3:23
20.	"Leaving Home" (Slightly Odway)	Jebediah	3:00
21.	"A Slow Descent" (Imago)	The Butterfly Effect	4:41
Total length:			79:11

== See also ==
- Triple J Hottest 100 of Australian Songs
