= The Essential Hits =

Greatest hits album by George
- Released: 13 August 2010
- Genre: Pop music, Rock music
- Length: 44:46
- Label: Warner Music Australia

George chronology
Unity (2004)	The Essential Hits (2010)	The Early Years (2016)

The Essential Hits is the first greatest hits album from Australian band George. It was released in August 2010. The album contains five top 50 singles and includes tracks from the band's two top 5 albums, including the multi-platinum, ARIA Award-winning Polyserena.

== Track listing ==
1. "Special Ones" - 3:47
2. "Run" - 4:18
3. "Still Real" - 4:25
4. "Breaking it Slowly" - 4:02
5. "Release" - 3:42
6. "Fortunate Smile" - 6:43
7. "Breathe In Now" - 3:50
8. "Bastard Son" - 4:08
9. "Surrender" - 5:37
10. "Today" - 3:57
