= Next in Line =

Next in Line may refer to:

- "Next in Line" (Conway Twitty song)
- "Next in Line" (Johnny Cash song)
- "Next in Line" (Dead Letter Circus song)
- "Next in Line", a song by AfterImage
- "Next in Line", a song by Walk the Moon from the album Walk the Moon
- "Next in Line", a song by Korn from the album The Serenity of Suffering
- Next in Line, the original name of the band The Ordinary Boys
- "The Next in Line", a short story by Ray Bradbury
- The first in an order of succession
