= Dead Letter Circus (EP) =

EP by Dead Letter Circus
- Released: 5 May 2007
- Genre: Alternative rock, progressive rock
- Length: 24:22
- Label: MGM Distribution
- Producer: Forrester Savell & Dead Letter Circus

Dead Letter Circus chronology
Dead Letter Circus (2007)	This Is the Warning (2010)

Dead Letter Circus is the first EP by Australian alternative rock band Dead Letter Circus. It was released in 2007 and was distributed by MGM Distribution. It is available for purchase in the iTunes Store.

A music video was made for "Disconnect and Apply", featuring footage of the band playing live across different venues.

== History ==
The band was formed when the Brisbane, Australian band Ochre disbanded, and three of its members formed Dead Letter Circus. The new band already had one song, "Tremors", which was recorded while Ochre was still going, and was completely different from Ochre's musical style ("Tremors" was later featured as a B-side to the "Next in Line" single). Dead Letter Circus released this EP on 5 May 2007.

== Track listing ==
No.	Title	Length
1.	"The Mile"	3:25
2.	"Lines"	3:41
3.	"Disconnect and Apply"	3:04
4.	"Are We Closer"	3:32
5.	"This Life Awake"	4:10
6.	"Alien"	6:28
Total length:		24:22

== Notes ==
1. "Disconnect and Apply" was remixed in 2008 as an iTunes exclusive bonus track on Dead Letter Circus's third single, "Next in Line". The remix was called "Inferiority Complex" and featured vocals by vocalist Ezekiel Ox, because the song was remixed by Mammal.
