= Everybodys Jesus =

Single by Butterfingers

from the album The Deeper You Dig...
- Released: January 24, 2005
- Recorded: 2004
- Genre: Hip hop
- Label: Valley Trash
- Songwriter(s): Eddie Jacobson

Butterfingers singles chronology
"I Love Work"	"Everybodys Jesus" (2005)	"FIGJAM" (2005)

Everybodys Jesus [sic] is a "double b-side" released by Australian hip hop group Butterfingers on 24 January 2005 on the Valley Trash label. The CD single feature the songs "Jesus I Was Evil" and "Everybody's Ugly", the latter which later appeared on the album The Deeper You Dig....

"Jesus I Was Evil" was written and originally recorded by New Zealand artist Darcy Clay and is the band's first recorded cover. Clay (born Daniel Bolton) released the song in June 1997, where it peaked at No. 5 on the New Zealand Singles Chart remaining in the chart for eight weeks. Clay committed suicide on 15 March 1998.

The song received considerable airplay on national broadcaster Triple J and for the first time, commercial radio via Nova FM. "Jesus I Was Evil" charted at No. 69 in the Triple J's Hottest 100 of 2005. The single reached No. 17 on the ARIA Hitseekers chart and also peaked at No. 7 on the AIR Singles charts in February 2005.

In a review by the Oz Music Project, "Jesus I Was Evil" was described as "an anarchic tale of youth rebellion pummelled into sensible, reformed adulthood.", whilst the reviewer considered that "Everybody's Ugly" "...continues on the mutinous path with a gritty rock feel that almost can’t decide whether to be punk or rock, or perhaps the bastard child of both styles."

== Track listing ==
All songs written by Eddie Jacobson, except where noted

1. "Jesus I Was Evil" (Daniel Bolton) - 1:47
2. "Everybody's Ugly" - 2:45
