= Self-titled/Homebrew =

EP by George
- Released: 1998
- Genre: Rock

George chronology
Self-titled/Homebrew (1998)	You Can Take What's Mine (1999)

Self-titled/Homebrew, often simply known as George, was the first CD release from Brisbane band George. The band was formed in 1996 for a music contest and as it had finally broken down from a larger-pieced band to a five-piece band, their debut extended play was created in 1998. The band then included siblings Katie and Ty Noonan, Geoff Green, Geoff Hooton and Nick Stewart. The EP included four songs, Katie and Tyrone writing two each. The complete EP was also featured on George's DVD documentary Polyserena in Bloom as an easter egg.

== Track listing ==
1. "Homebrew" – Katie Noonan
2. "Bar Scene part one" – Ty Noonan
3. "Sellout" – Katie Noonan
4. "Cry" – Ty Noonan

Notes

- "Sellout" was later reworked into a slower rock song on their debut album Polyserena.
- "Cry" was later remixed on their next EP You Can Take What's Mine.
