= Take away (disambiguation) =

Take away refers to food prepared in a restaurant to be eaten elsewhere.

Take Away or Takeaway may also refer to:

== Film and television ==
- Take Away (film), a 2003 film
- "Takeaway" (Bluey), an episode of the first season of the animated TV series Bluey
- "Take Away" (The Professionals), a 1980 television episode
- The Takeaways, a fictional band in the Australian TV series Sweet and Sour

== Music ==
- Take Away / The Lure of Salvage, a 1980 album by Andy Partridge
- "Take Away" (song), by Missy Elliott
- Takeaway (song), by The Chainsmokers

== Other uses ==
- The Takeaway, a news radio program
- Takeaway.com, a Dutch food ordering website

== See also ==
- Subtraction, the act of which may be referred to as "take away"
- Taken Away, a 1989 American television film starring Valerie Bertinelli
- Take It Away (disambiguation)
- Take out (disambiguation)
- Turnover (basketball)
- Turnover (gridiron football)
