= FIGJAM =

FIGJAM may refer to:

- "Figjam", a 2005 single by Australian band Butterfingers
- FigJam, an online collaboration product developed by Figma

== See also ==
- Common fig
- Fruit preserves
