= The Space on the Wall =

2009 single by Dead Letter Circus

Single by Dead Letter Circus
- Released: 11 August 2009
- Genre: Alternative rock, progressive rock
- Length: 3:58
- Label: MGM Distribution
- Songwriter(s): Kim Benzie, Stewart Hill, Rob Maric, Forrester Savell, Luke Williams

Dead Letter Circus singles chronology
"Next in Line" (2008)	"The Space on the Wall" (2009)	"Big" (2010)

"The Space on the Wall" is a song by Australian alternative rock band Dead Letter Circus, released in August 2009 as the lead single from their debut studio album This Is the Warning.

== Song history ==
The first demos of the song were played by Australian radio station Triple J before the song's release. When the song was released in August 2009, it received regular airplay on the radio station, and still does. A joke video for the song was released on YouTube by the band. The video was made up entirely of videos of the drummer Luke Williams, playing the song with different pieces of food, like hot dogs and celery.

In 2009, the band sourced talent from (at the time) 24-year-old Tasmanian graphic artist, Cameron Gray to collaborate on artwork for the visual identity of the Space on The Wall single. In a 2009 newsletter, rumours were confirmed that Gray would also create the artwork to accompany the band's album, as well as a piece of artwork to accompany each song from the album.

== Reception ==
The song was received well in the underground Australian music scene and gathered much praise. Musicfeeds.com described the song in a review: "Blending soaring melodic vocals with epic modern rock sounds, "The Space on the Wall" is like a storm rolling over the horizon."

== Remix ==
On 3 December 2009, "The Space on the Wall (Daleese remix)" was made available for free download on Dead Letter Circus' MySpace. The mix was done by Dan Sutherland (of Many Machines on 9).
