= Still Real =

Single by George

from the album Unity
- Released: 14 November 2003
- Studio: Festival Studios, Sydney
- Genre: Rock, soft rock
- Length: 4:03
- Label: Festival Mushroom
- Songwriter(s): Katie Noonan
- Producer(s): George, David Nicholas

George singles chronology
"Breaking It Slowly" (2002)	"Still Real" (2003)

"Still Real" is a song from Australian alternative rock group, George. It was released as the lead and only single taken from their second studio album Unity (2004).

== Track listing ==
CD single (021622)

1. "Still Real" (album version) – 4:27
2. "Quiet Heart" (with The Go-Betweens) – 5:29
3. "Man Overboard" (with Deborah Conway) – 4:10
4. "Still Real" (Radio edit) – 4:03
- "Still Real" (CD-ROM video clip)

== Personnel ==
- Benjamin Portas – artwork
- Paulie B – bass, guitar
- Geoff Green – drums, percussion
- Justin Tresidder – additional engineer (tracks 1 to 3)
- Paul Pilsneniks – assistant engineer (track 1)
- Evan McHugh – assistant engineer (tracks 2 and 3)
- Nick Stewart – guitar
- Katie Noonan – vocals, keyboards
- Tyrone Noonan – vocals, keyboards, guitar

== Charts ==
Chart (2003)	Peak position
Australia (ARIA)	37
