= Stand Apart =

EP by Dead Letter Circus
- Released: 29 August 2014
- Genre: Alternative rock, progressive rock
- Length: 24:28
- Label: UNFD

Dead Letter Circus chronology
The Catalyst Fire (2013)	Stand Apart (2014)	Aesthesis (2015)

Stand Apart is an acoustic and third overall EP by Australian alternative rock band Dead Letter Circus. It was exclusively released through iTunes on 29 August 2014 preceding four sold-out acoustic shows. The songs are re-imagined versions (including string arrangements) of tunes from the band's second album The Catalyst Fire (2013).

== History ==
The band played Triple J's Like a Version earlier in 2014, including an acoustic version of their single "I Am" as well as an acoustic version of the Rage Against the Machine song "Killing in the Name". The songs, especially the cover, were met with huge internet buzz. Shortly after, Dead Letter Circus announced they would be performing a number of intimate acoustic shows in September. Just a week before the tour started, on 29 August, the band announced the surprise release of Stand Apart containing six re-imagined acoustic versions of songs from The Catalyst Fire.

Both "Lodestar" and "I Am" were previously released as bonus tracks for The Catalyst Fire in North America.

== Track listing ==
No.	Title	Length
1.	"Stand Apart" (acoustic)	3:12
2.	"Alone Awake" (acoustic)	5:15
3.	"Say Your Prayers" (acoustic)	5:01
4.	"Lodestar" (acoustic)	3:28
5.	"Burning Man" (acoustic)	3:43
6.	"I Am" (acoustic)	3:49
Total length:		24:28

== Charts ==
Chart (2014)	Peak position
Australian Albums (ARIA)	24
