= One Second of Insanity =

2003 single by the Butterfly Effect

Single by The Butterfly Effect

from the album Begins Here
- Released: 2003
- Recorded: November 2002 – March 2003
- Genre: Alternative metal
- Length: 2:22
- Label: Modern, Roadshow, Sony International
- Songwriters: Kurt Goedhart, Clint Boge, Ben Hall, Glenn Esmond
- Producers: Dave Leonard, The Butterfly Effect

The Butterfly Effect singles chronology
| "Crave" (2002) | "One Second of Insanity" (2003) | "Always" (2003) |

"One Second of Insanity" (also styled as "1 Second of Insanity") was the second single from the debut album, Begins Here, by Australian rock group, The Butterfly Effect and was released in 2003. Though the track failed to appear on the ARIA Singles Chart, it was ranked at No. 68 on the Triple J's Hottest 100 of 2003. The national radio station, Triple J, had played it, as a radio-only release, which had a limited run of 500 CD single units pressed.

The single was also released in the United Kingdom and Europe on 19 August 2004 on Modern Music.

== Background ==
"One Second of Insanity" was the second single from the debut album, Begins Here, by Australian rock group, The Butterfly Effect and was released in 2003. The Brisbane-based band were formed in 1999 by Clint Boge on guitar, Glenn Esmond on bass guitar and vocals, Kurt Goedhart on guitar and Ben Hall on drums. They spent November 2002 to March 2003 recording their debut album at Modern Music Studios. The album was released in Australia on 4 August 2003 and debuted at No. 24 on the ARIA Albums Chart.

The single was played by national radio station, Triple J, and appeared at No. 68 on the Triple J's Hottest 100 of 2003. "One Second of Insanity" was written by Goedhart, Boge, Hall and Esmond.

The single was also released in the United Kingdom and Europe on 23 August 2004. musicOMH's Sacha Esterson reviewed the album and declared that "One Second of Insanity" was "very short, and that's probably a good thing. It lacks the quality shown in the rest of the tracks, and loses steam after about one minute". Chris Linosi (musicOMH) describes the song as being "short, sharp and may well have its 15 minutes of fame, but it's bordering on the average and it in no way reflects the maturity of the rest of their debut album".

The song was also featured in the second season of the Australian television drama series, Love My Way.

== Track listing ==
1. One Second of Insanity – 2.22
