= Breathe in Now =

Single by George

from the album Polyserena
- Released: 28 January 2002
- Studio: Festival Studios, Sydney
- Genre: Indie rock, soft rock
- Length: 3:52
- Label: Festival Mushroom
- Songwriter(s): Katie Noonan
- Producer(s): George, David Nichols

George singles chronology
"Run" (2001)	"Breathe in Now" (2002)	"Breaking It Slowly" (2002)

"Breathe in Now" is a song by Australian alternative rock group George. It was released as the third single from their debut studio album Polyserena (2002).

George performed the song live on Rove Live.

== Track listing ==
CD single (020702)

1. "Breathe in Now" – 3:52
2. "Dublin Song" – 3:08
3. "Quiet Day" – 2:56
4. "Not Me, Not You" – 3:42
5. "Special Ones" (live) – 3:51

== Charts ==
Chart (2002)	Peak position
Australia (ARIA)	29
