= Take Out (disambiguation) =

Take-out is food purchased at a restaurant that the purchaser intends to eat elsewhere.

Take Out or Takeout may also refer to:

- Take Out (2004 film), independent film co-written and directed by Sean Baker and Shih-Ching Tsou
- Google Takeout, a project by the Google Data Liberation Front
- Takeouts (juggling), a juggling pattern
- The Takeout, a news podcast hosted by Major Garrett
- The Takeout, a food website owned by Static Media
- To take (someone) out or take out a target, assassination
- To take (someone) out, dating

== See also ==
- Take away (disambiguation)
