= The Catalyst Fire =

Studio album by Dead Letter Circus
- Released: 9 August 2013
- Recorded: 2012–2013
- Genres: Alternative rock, progressive rock, experimental rock
- Label: UNFD
- Producer: Forrester Savell

Dead Letter Circus chronology
This Is the Warning (2010)	The Catalyst Fire (2013)	Stand Apart (2014)

Singles from The Catalyst Fire
- 1. "Lodestar" Released: 5 July 2013

The Catalyst Fire is the second studio album by Australian progressive rock band Dead Letter Circus. It featured new band members Tom Skerlj and Clint Vincent after founding member and guitarist Rob Maric left the band at the end of 2012.

== History ==
In 2011, Tom Skerlj was added to the band as a second guitarist and keyboardist and the band began working on writing new material, hinting that they would follow a similar process to the preceding album in that completion of the songwriting would occur while the band was recording the album; "We don't ever write whole songs before we go into the studio. We generally take the seeds of songs," Benzie explained in mid-2011.

The band continued to tour in 2011 and played a limited number of shows in 2012, with guitarist Rob Maric spending time away from the band to deal with personal issues for the majority of the year. Clint Vincent of fellow Brisbane band Melodyssey was announced as his touring replacement. Maric announced in January 2013 that he would not be returning to the band, and Vincent was announced as Rob's permanent replacement a few days later.

In late June 2013, the band finally confirmed the title of the new album, The Catalyst Fire, and stated it was to be released on 9 August. Forrester Savell produced the album, following his work on the band's debut This Is the Warning. On 5 July, the band released a new video and single for the track "Lodestar".

== Themes ==
In an interview in 2011, Benzie explained that thematically the album would follow the subject matter of This Is the Warning; "most of the next one's going to be a bit of the after-effect: How can you combat things like that? How can small people deceive world bankers? The answer will actually be everyone -- what everyone does within their individual bubble, how we choose to act, and if that will butterfly effect out."

In 2013, Benzie revealed that some of the album's content was inspired by the band's touring, their environmental conscience and Benzie's experiences with the drug ayahuasca in South America. He added, "one of the reasons the album is quite dark, particularly on songs like The Cure, is part of the realisation that I am inadvertently responsible for all the things I see happening on TV, making that connection between what is happening in the world and my apathy. We're not slamming anything down anyone's throat, it's just the emotional snapshot of what we feel now."

== Reception ==
The Music.com.au gave the album a positive review, stating that "The Catalyst Fire is everything you expect: powerful, energetic, uplifting and inspiring." Space Ship News praised the album, suggesting that "If This Is the Warning was a band firing on all cylinders, then The Catalyst Fire shows a band firing on cylinders they didn't even know they had; powerful and aggressive, yet somehow pristine and melodic." SF Media also lauded the album, suggesting it was better than its predecessor and saying that "while the debut was excellent, it had the occasional dry moment here and there. Not so here, each and every song is strong, meaningful and compelling, especially opener 'The Cure' and first single 'Lodestar'."

The album has also been a success commercially, debuting at #2 on the Australian (ARIA) Album Charts, and was Triple J's feature album of the week starting 19 August.

== Track listing ==
No.	Title	Length
1.	"The Cure"	3:53
2.	"Alone Awake"	4:36
3.	"Burning Man"	3:31
4.	"Lodestar"	3:28
5.	"I Am"	5:33
6.	"Say Your Prayers"	4:46
7.	"The Veil"	4:10
8.	"Insider"	4:17
9.	"Lost Without Leaders"	4:13
10.	"Stand Apart"	2:39
11.	"Kachina"	5:42

North American Bonus Tracks
No.	Title	Length
12.	"I Am (acoustic)"	3:49
13.	"Lodestar (acoustic)"	3:28
14.	"Wake Up"	4:00

== Charts ==
Chart (2013)	Peak position
Australian Albums (ARIA)	2
