= Final Conversation of Kings =

Studio album by The Butterfly Effect
- Released: September 20, 2008
- Recorded: May – June 2008 at The Grove Studios, Oasis Studios, and Gold Coast Studios
- Genres: Alternative rock, progressive rock
- Length: 42:38
- Label: Village Roadshow Music
- Producer: Forrester Savell

The Butterfly Effect chronology
| Imago (2006) | Final Conversation of Kings (2008) | IV (2022) |

Final Conversation of Kings is the third studio album by Australian Alternative rock band The Butterfly Effect. It was released on September 20, 2008. The album was the band's first foray into a more progressive rock sound, and their last for 14 years, until 2022's IV. The album's first single, "Window and the Watcher", was released on a few weeks prior to the album's release on September 6, 2008. "Final Conversation" and "In These Hands" were also later released as singles. The album was generally well-received, debuting at no. 3 on the Australian Music Charts and receiving positive reviews from critics, who praised the more progressive nature of the album's sound.

== Background ==
Tension between band members had started as early as the recording sessions for the band's prior studio album, Imago. During this time, the band's then-producer Joe Barresi almost cancelled the sessions due to the animosity amongst members. Most notable of the problems was the clashing of vocalist Clint Boge with the rest of the band, who resented Boge's drunken behavior, which they felt was having an adverse effect on the band, most notably upsetting people "high up in the music business". The band managed to complete the album, and even have it find success, with it debuting at no. 2 on the Australian music charts. Despite the success, tensions did not ease, with Boge and band co-founder and guitarist Kurt Goedhart not speaking to one another for the entirety of their six-week tour with American rock band Chevelle. These tensions would resurface and affect recording sessions for the Final Conversation of Kings as well.

== Writing and recording ==
The band began writing material for the album during the Imago touring cycle, though only lightly, as the band felt their best material was generally not created while on the road. Between 15 and 20 songs were written prior to entering the studio with the band following their typical process; Goedhart would present a basis for a song, the band would collectively add their input, and then Boge would add the lyrics and vocals. However, this time around, bassist Glenn Esmond also provided the basis for a few tracks. The writing process spanned a year and a half; while the track "Rain" was written 18 months prior to recording the album, "Window and the Watcher" was written four weeks prior to entering the studio.

Contrary to the writing process, which exceeded a year's length, the band was limited to six weeks of recording time in the studio. The band entered the studio at the beginning of May 2008, and had through June of the same year to work on the album. The band spent five weeks on initial recordings at The Grove Studios, focusing on recording drum and bass parts and preliminary guitar and vocal takes, and then one and a half weeks at Oasis Studios recording additional vocal and guitar parts. The band worked with Karnivool and Dead Letter Circus collaborator Forrester Savell on both pre-production demos and as a producer.

The limited time in the studio led to continued tensions between members. Compounding the problem was a lack of agreement with the direction of the album. Goedhart referred to the album content as "misaligned" and "mismatched", due to disagreements between members on which tracks should make the album. The album's opening track, "Worlds On Fire", was a common point of contention. Boge threatened to leave the band if it was not included on the final track list, when other members criticized the song for sounding too much like a Muse song. Esmond also stated that it had originally been two separate tracks, and that once it was turned into a seven-minute track, he had envisioned it as the album closer. The band settled on its being part of the album, but instead as the opening track, as they felt it gave "a grander feeling of intent" when placed at the beginning. Goedhart admitted he wished the band had had another two months in the studio, so they could have either reworked the track "In These Hands", or had time to finish another track to replace it and remove it from the album altogether.

== Themes and composition ==
The album's lyrical themes are centered around the idea of "conflict". Esmond stated that the band's original intent wasn't to write a concept album, and Boge said that he didn't write the lyrics as one, but that he could understand how one could interpret it as one. Goedhart explained the album title's origin, and its connection with the album's message, stating:

...we were looking for an interesting word much like what we did for the last record with Imago. Then Glenn came in with this word from a Latin phrase which some how translated to the Final Conversation of Kings. And the translation was really cool, so we decided to keep it. And it also had a nice ring to it too. Its meaning relates to "going to war". It is that final conversation where they can't resolve it and so the next step is war. The general thing with the record relates to conflict, that is the overall theme of the album. It is applicable to so many situations from the individual to something on a global scale."

Esmond later admitted that he actually had intended for the album to be literally titled after the respective Latin phrase, "Ultima Ratio Regum", but that the band members preferred the English translation, Last Conversation of Kings.

Esmond described the album's sound as "the final chapter of what we started with Imago, we explored that progressive sound". The album marked the band's first attempt to use outside musicians and instruments outside of the guitar, bass, and drum set up. The band recruited several studio musicians for the album, including Bob Shultz to play trumpet, Tyrone Noonan for piano, and Will Eager for vibraphone; though in all instances, the instruments were used to create a fuller sound and for subtle effects, not as predominant, sound driving effects.

== Release and promotion ==
The band began their Last Conversation of Kings tour in July 2008, with the album releasing shortly afterwards on September 6, 2008.

== Reception ==
Professional ratings
Review scores
| Source | Rating |
|---|---|
| Metal Storm | 8/10 stars |
| Sputnik Music | 4/5 stars |
| The New Zealand Herald | " |

The album was generally well received, both commercially and critically. The album debuted at no. 3 in the Australian Music Charts. Critics generally applauded the more progressive sound the band took on the album. Metal Storm compared the album favorably to bands such as Tool or Porcupine Tree, stating that the band managed to take their progressive melancholic sound and make it into something more "accessible and catchy with great choruses" and "damn effective riffs." Sputnik Music compared the album favorably to Fair to Midland, describing it as "Dark, heavy, yet strangely relaxing all the same, the album manages to vary itself up without drifting too far from The Butterfly Effect's primary sound" and concluded that the album was "...a confident, free flowing collection of songs that represents some of the year's strongest alt rock." The New Zealand Herald was less enthusiastic, stating that mediocre tracks such as "Window and the Watcher" and "...And the Promise of Truth" kept the album from reaching its true potential, though they did praise "World on Fire" as "the album's finest moment".

The album made Rolling Stone's "Top Albums of 2008".

== Track listing ==
All lyrics are written by Clint Boge; all music is composed by The Butterfly Effect.

| No. | Title | Length |
|---|---|---|
| 1. | "Worlds on Fire" | 7:04 |
| 2. | "Room Without a View" | 4:13 |
| 3. | "Final Conversation" | 3:22 |
| 4. | "The Way" | 4:22 |
| 5. | "Window and the Watcher" | 3:21 |
| 6. | "...And the Promise of the Truth" | 3:52 |
| 7. | "In These Hands" | 3:49 |
| 8. | "7 Days" | 5:09 |
| 9. | "Rain" | 4:07 |
| 10. | "Sum of 1" | 3:10 |

iTunes edition
| No. | Title | Length |
|---|---|---|
| 11. | "Landslide" | 4:25 |

Tour Edition (Bonus live tracks)
| No. | Title | Length |
|---|---|---|
| 11. | "Worlds on Fire" | 7:16 |
| 12. | "A Slow Descent" | 4:57 |
| 13. | "Window and the Watcher" | 3:44 |
| 14. | "Final Conversation" | 3:22 |
| 15. | "In These Hands" | 4:02 |
| 16. | "Sum of 1" | 3:46 |

== Personnel ==
Band

- Clint Boge – lead vocals
- Kurt Goedhart – guitar
- Glenn Esmond – bass guitar
- Ben Hall – drums

Additional musicians and production

- Tyrone Noonan – background vocals, Analog synthesizer, electric and acoustic piano
- Will Eager – vibraphone
- Bob Shultz – trumpet
- Forrester Savell – producer, audio engineering, audio mixing, background vocals
- Karl "Monaux" Kwasny – album artwork

== Charts ==
| Chart (2008) | Peak position |
|---|---|
| Australian Albums (ARIA) | 3 |

== Certifications ==
| Region | Certification | Certified units/sales |
|---|---|---|
| Australia (ARIA) | Gold | 35,000^{^} |
^{^} Shipments figures based on certification alone.
