= You Can Take What's Mine =

EP by George
- Released: 1999
- Genre: Rock music
- Length: 27:58
- Label: Shock Records
- Producer: Brendan Morley

George chronology
Self-titled/Homebrew (1998)	You Can Take What's Mine (1999)	Bastard Son/Holiday (2000)

You Can Take What's Mine, is the second extended play from Brisbane band George and first non-self-released EP.. The EP was released in 1999.

The CD-ROM component has footage of the band answering some questions. An extended version of "Spawn" appears on their debut studio album, Polyserena.

== Track listing ==
1. "Spawn"
2. "Polyserena"
3. "Nothing"
4. "G.S.T."
5. "To The Void"
6. "Cry" (Krus D & Carlos F Remix)

== Weekly charts ==
Chart (1999)	Peak position
Australia (ARIA)	82
