= Imago (The Butterfly Effect album) =

Studio album by The Butterfly Effect
- Released: 17 June 2006
- Recorded: April–June 2005
- Studio: Sound City
- Genre: Progressive rock; post-grunge; alternative rock
- Length: 46:49
- Label: Modern; Village Roadshow
- Producer: Joe Barresi

The Butterfly Effect chronology
Begins Here (2003)	Imago (2006)	Final Conversation of Kings (2008)

Singles from Imago
- 1. "A Slow Descent" Released: 2006; 2. "Gone" Released: 2006; 3. "Reach" Released: 2007

Imago is the second full-length album by the Brisbane band The Butterfly Effect. It was recorded by the line-up of Clint Boge on lead vocals, Glenn Esmond on bass guitar, Kurt Goedhart on lead guitar and Ben Hall on drums, with Joe Barresi producing. It was released on 17 June 2006 and debuted on the ARIA Albums Chart at number 2, which is the group's first top 10 album.

== Background ==
The track "Phoenix", which was released to Australian radio in 2005 prior to Imago's release, did not make the cut for the album, but appeared as a b-side on the lead single, "A Slow Descent" (June 2006).

== Sound and composition ==
The sound of Imago is more progressive than their previous album and is less heavy. The album shows the band have all but lost their earlier nu-metal influences which has made them more popular. Clint Boge's vocals are also more refined and as a result, his range is higher and more diverse than the previous releases. The title track, "Imago", is an instrumental.

== Reception ==
The album was listed at number 88 on the Triple J Hottest 100 Albums of All Time.

== Track listing ==
No.	Title	Length
1.	"Imago"	1:19
2.	"Aisles of White"	4:13
3.	"Gone"	4:07
4.	"A Slow Descent"	4:41
5.	"Reach"	4:58
6.	"Before They Knew"	3:55
7.	"In a Memory"	6:19
8.	"This Year"	3:42
9.	"Signs"	4:39
10.	"Everybody Runs"	4:32
11.	"The End"	4:25

== Charts ==
Chart (2006/07)	Peak position
Australian Albums (ARIA)	2

== Certifications ==
Region	Certification	Certified units/sales
Australia (ARIA)	Gold	35,000^{^}
^{^} Shipments figures based on certification alone.

== Personnel ==
Band

- Clint Boge – lead vocals
- Kurt Goedhart – lead guitar
- Glenn Esmond – bass guitar
- Ben Hall – drums

Production

- Joe Barresi – producer
