= Take It Away =

Take It Away may refer to:

- "Take It Away" (Paul McCartney song), 1982
- "Take It Away" (The Used song), 2004
- "Take It Away" (L.A.B. song), 2023
- Take It Away!, a 1968 Buddy Rich big band album (a.k.a. The New One!)
- "Take It Away", song by Raven from their 1983 album All for One
- "Take It Away", song by The Butterfly Effect from their 2001 EP The Butterfly Effect EP
- "Take It Away", 2011 song by Karmin
