= This Is the Warning =

Studio album by Dead Letter Circus
- Released: 14 May 2010
- Recorded: December 2009/January 2010
- Genre: Alternative rock, progressive rock, experimental rock
- Length: 53:32
- Label: Warner Music Australia
- Producer: Forrester Savell

Dead Letter Circus chronology
Dead Letter Circus (EP) (2007)	This Is the Warning (2010)	The Catalyst Fire (2013)

Alternative covers
- Vinyl cover

Singles from This Is the Warning
- 1. "The Space on the Wall" Released: 11 August 2009; 2. "Big" Released: 9 April 2010

This Is the Warning is the debut album by Australian alternative/progressive rock band Dead Letter Circus. It was released on Friday 14 May 2010 and distributed by Warner Music Australia. For those who pre-ordered the album on the band's website, they received the digital album on the day of its release, as well as the hard copy of the album, sent through the mail.

The band also announced a This Is the Warning album launch tour which will play shows in most major capital cities in Australia.

Tasmanian graphic artist Cameron Gray has collaborated with the band and his artwork is featured on the album's cover and booklet. Some of his work has already been revealed on the Project Dead Letter website.

== Themes ==
The band have stated that the album is "a first person account of awakening to the construct that has been put in place in an attempt to control and mold us. However, it's also about refusing to be a subject of it and forging your own path."

In 2011, Benzie revealed in-depth the concept behind the album; "the album’s basically a document of the awakening, realising that there is this structure and not being a part of it. We don’t really exist in that world, within the band.We haven’t watched television for five years. You can’t avoid it, obviously, but we’ve been so busy doing this thing. With the internet, we started to inform ourselves a long time ago. That became our news media. You get an ear for what’s the truth." Benzie went on to reveal the real-world events that inspired the lyrics for the album; "war over oil fields and stuff like that. The disgrace of certain governments. Everyone can probably guess which governments we’re talking about. The larger Western world. The way that they go about obtaining what they need from the poor countries, everything from Iraq to Africa. You kill many people so you can run an oil pipeline through their country. 9/11 – that whole time was so surreal. It really shaped our world."

== Artwork ==
The album's artwork was done by artist Cameron Gray, whose pieces were also used for the singles, as well as poster and merchandise designs. Gray was discovered by Benzie who was looking for an artist that captured the visual feel of the band; "I really liked him when I found him online. I’d actually been searching all these artists, and I was looking at this surrealist stuff, I think it was, artists in his style, and I just looked at his stuff and felt this real connection. Everything he does is very first person, and all our songs are generally from the first person [perspective]." Benzie also revealed that the artwork was a creative process, with Benzie providing Gray with the music and lyrics, to which he interpreted and produced the body of work that would become the album artwork; "How we did it is basically I would send him the song and the lyrics, and then he’d send something back and go, "Is this what you mean?" But like any conversation, it was pretty easy to misunderstand each other, so if he didn't get it right the first time, or if he missed the meanings of the songs, which is also very easy to do, I would send him back a two-page rant about whatever the song was about. He'd generally get it right the next time he sent it through. I think we did like 24 pieces of art for the 12 songs and a couple extras, as well, that we kept for posters and stuff."

== Reception ==
Professional ratings
Review scores
Source	Rating
Allmusic	4/5 stars
Kill Your Stereo	(78/100)
Melodic.net	5/5 stars
The Metal Forge	9/10 stars
Planet-Loud	(7/10)
Pop Art Magazine	(Mixed)
The Vine	(Unfavourable)
Your Gigs	2.5/5 stars

The album has been generally met with positive reviews. Melodic.net called the album "refreshing, uplifting and incredible," also stating that "this is a 12 track album that is packed full of killer tracks and surprises from beginning to end." Allmusic described the album as "Delay-based guitar textures are interlaced with subtle synth undercurrents, creating complex patterns out of a set of simple rhythms without cutting down on melody, and the whole thing is executed with a surgical precision that recalls the incarnation of Krautrock promoted by Maserati -- while the sheer intensity brings to mind God Is an Astronaut more than My Chemical Romance."

However, The Vine's Andrew McMillen described the album as "disappointing," saying that "the album's many attempts at meaningful, emotive prog-rock continue to strike me as hokey and half-baked." yourGigs' also lamented the album as being average, saying that "everything just sounds too perfect, too machine-like, and, musically speaking, as a result, comes off sounding cold and devoid of heart."

== Track listing ==
The track listing for the album was revealed on the Project Dead Letter website on Day #27 leading up to the launch.

No.	Title	Length
1.	"Here We Divide"	5:07
2.	"One Step"	3:29
3.	"Big"	3:42
4.	"The Space on the Wall"	3:57
5.	"This Long Hour"	4:28
6.	"Cage"	4:45
7.	"Reaction"	3:45
8.	"The Drum"	6:16
9.	"The Design"	5:46
10.	"Next in Line"	3:23
11.	"Walk"	4:11
12.	"This Is the Warning"	4:46
Total length:		53:32

North American bonus tracks
No.	Title	Length
13.	"Tremors" (from the "Next in Line" single)	3:38
14.	"The Mile" (from the Dead Letter Circus EP)	3:25
15.	"Disconnect and Apply" (from the Dead Letter Circus EP)	3:04
16.	"Lines" (from the Dead Letter Circus EP)	3:41
Total length:		67:20

== Charts ==
Chart (2010)	Peak position
Australian Albums (ARIA)	2

== Certifications ==
Region	Certification	Certified units/sales
Australia (ARIA)	Gold	35,000^{^}
^{^} Shipments figures based on certification alone.
