= The Deeper You Dig... =

Studio album by Butterfingers
- Released: 20 June 2006
- Recorded: Black Box Studios; 2006
- Length: 44:09
- Label: Valley Trash
- Producer: Magoo & Butterfingers

Butterfingers chronology
Breakfast at Fatboys (2004)	The Deeper You Dig... (2006)	Bad News (2020)

Singles from The Deeper You Dig...
- 1. "Figjam" Released: 2005; 2. "Get Up Outta the Dirt" Released: 2006; 3. "I Like Em When They're Trouble" Released: 2006

Professional ratings
Review scores
Source	Rating
AllMusic	3.5/5 stars

The Deeper You Dig... is the second studio album released by Australian rap rock group, Butterfingers. It was released 20 June 2006 on the band's independent label, Valley Trash Records.

The album received a lot of commercial success, with the album peaking at #14 on the Australian album charts and #2 on the ARIA Urban album chart. The single "Figjam" was nominated for the Best Urban Release ARIA Award. Popular with Triple J listeners which gained attention to the tracks "Get Up Outta the Dirt", "Figjam" and "I Like Em When They're Trouble".

"Figjam" contains a sample taken from "77%", as performed by The Herd and "Variety" contains elements from "Ladies Man", performed by Bias B.

== Track listing ==
All tracks written by Eddie Jacobson unless otherwise indicated.

1. "Anthem" – 4:15
2. "Everybody's Ugly" – 2:29
3. "Like Em When They're Trouble" – 3:58
4. "Figjam" – 3:33
5. "Happy Well Adjusted Psychopath" – 1:41
6. "Beats by the Pound" (E. Jacobson, N. Grace, D. Kudelka) – 3:47
7. "Turkey Jerky" (E. Jacobson, D. Crane, D. Green, O. Thomas) – 2:17
8. "Get Up Outta The Dirt" – 4:16
9. "Ska Chase" (E. Jacobson, D. Crane, A.Garbutt) – 3:48
10. "Golden Sunshine" – 4:10
11. "Beautiful Music" – 4:36
12. "Variety" – 5:27

== Charts ==
Chart (2006)	Peak position
Australian Albums (ARIA Charts)	14
