= A Slow Descent =

Single by The Butterfly Effect

from the album Imago
- Released: 10 June 2006 (Australia)
- Genre: Alternative metal, art rock
- Label: Modern Music

The Butterfly Effect singles chronology
"A Beautiful Mine" (2005)	"A Slow Descent" (2006)	"Gone" (2006)

"A Slow Descent" a song by Australian band, The Butterfly Effect. It was released in June 2006 as the lead single from the band's second studio album, Imago. The single peaked at number 9 on the ARIA Charts.

== Track listing ==
1. "A Slow Descent" (Radio Edit)
2. "Phoenix"

== Charts ==
Chart (2006)	Peak position
Australia (ARIA)	9
