= Everytime (Butterfingers song) =

Single by Butterfingers

from the album Breakfast at Fatboys
- Released: 7 April 2003
- Recorded: 2003
- Genre: Hip hop
- Length: 4:22
- Label: Valley Trash
- Songwriters: Eddie Jacobson, David Crane

Butterfingers singles chronology
"Everytime" (2003)	"I Love Work" (2003)

Everytime is the first single released by Australian hip hop group Butterfingers. It was released as an EP on 7 April 2003 on the band's in-house Valley Trash label and distributed by MGM Distribution.

The Age's Kahlil Hegarty described it as "...an ode to working deadend [sic] jobs, articulating fantasies of punching supervisors in the face and outlining worstcase bad-day scenarios" and a song that Jacobson admits "has so much swearing in it and all the concepts are really gross".

The song received significant airplay on Triple J and the video aired on rage, Channel V and MTV. In an interview in October 2007 lead vocalist, Eddie Jacobson, recalls

Basically, I didn’t know how to get on Triple J. There was a girl called Nicole Foote who used to host the Hip Hop show, I sent her the first EP we had which had the "Everytime" track on it, she played it a couple of times and a couple of people heard it and it started getting requested on ‘Super Request’. Then Robbie Buck asked for a copy of it, so he could play it on ‘Home and Hosed’.

"Everytime" reached No. 38 in the Triple J's Hottest 100 of 2003, the first appearance by the band in the Hottest 100. The song also reached No. 16 on the AIR Independent Charts in May 2003.

== Track listing ==
No.	Title	Writer(s)	Length
1.	"Everytime"	Eddie Jacobson, David Crane	4:17
2.	"Everything I Did"	Eddie Jacobson	3:49
3.	"Females (Do Your Belt Up)"	Eddie Jacobson, David Crane	2:17
4.	"Let It Burn"	Eddie Jacobson	19:19
