= Don't You Think It's Time? =

Single by Bob Evans

from the album Suburban Songbook
- B-side: "Sisters Wedding Day"
- Released: 13 May 2006
- Recorded: 2005–2006
- Genre: Folk pop
- Length: 9:38
- Label: EMI Australia; Capitol Records
- Songwriter: Bob Evans
- Producers: Bob Evans & Brad Jones

Bob Evans singles chronology
"Turn" (2003)	"Don't You Think It's Time?" (2006)	"Nowhere Without You" (2006)

"Don't You Think It's Time?" is the first single to be taken from Bob Evans' (a.k.a. Kevin Mitchell from Jebediah) second album Suburban Songbook. The single was released 13 May 2006 and reached #22 on the ARIA Singles Chart. It also reached #37 on Triple J's Hottest 100 for 2006.

The album was produced by Nashville-based Brad Jones (Josh Rouse, Yo La Tengo, Sheryl Crow, Jill Sobule) at the 'Alex the Great Studios' in Nashville and features Ken Coomer (ex-Wilco) on drums. The single features two extra tracks not available elsewhere - Kevin Mitchell solo and one recorded at his home on a 4 track.

Evans wrote the song after a day spent hosting Channel V as Regurgitator recorded their album Mish Mash! as a Band in a Bubble. Evans wrote the music and added lyrics later. He remarked, "It’s actually not addressed to anyone specific at all. I wanted to write a peace song or a song about universal love. I was pretty obsessed with John Lennon at the time."

The video for the song was directed by Michael Spiccia, and was shot over three days, during which time the camera did not move. The first two days involved painters painting a beautiful mural and the third day was 'Bob' playing his guitar and singing, with a green screen in the background. The two were then merged with Bob in front with the mural being painted behind.

== Track listing ==
All songs written by Kevin Mitchell.

1. "Don't You Think It's Time?" - 3:20
2. "Sister's Wedding Day" - 3:16
3. "I've Lost the One I Love the Most" - 2:59

== Charts ==
Chart (2006)	Peak position
Australia (ARIA)	22
