= Breakfast at Fatboys =

Studio album by Butterfingers
- Released: 3 May 2004
- Recorded: Airlock, PSI F1, Black Box Studios; 2004
- Length: 49:17
- Label: Valley Trash
- Producer: Magoo

Butterfingers chronology
Breakfast at Fatboys (2004)	The Deeper You Dig... (2006)

Singles from Breakfast at Fatboys
- 1. "Everytime" Released: 2003; 2. "I Love Work" Released: 2003

Breakfast at Fatboys is the debut album by Australian rap rock group Butterfingers, released on 3 May 2004 on the group's own Valley Trash label and distributed by MGM.

The album reached #61 on the ARIA album charts, #15 on the ARIA Australian Release charts and #2 on the AIR (Australian Independent Record Labels Association) Charts where it remained in the top twenty of the AIR charts for over a year following its release. Triple J named it 'Album of the Week' upon its release and added the new single, "Yo Mama" to high rotation at the station. The album was also nominated for the Best Independent Release ARIA Award.

== Track listing ==
All songs written by Eddie Jacobson, except where noted

1. "Hook Up" (Eddie Jacobson, Damien Green, N. Grace) – 3:55
2. "Mandarines" – 3:57
3. "Everytime" (Jacobson, Dave Crane) – 4:23
4. "Yo Mama" (Jacobson, Crane) – 3:20
5. "Girl from Gore" – 2:21
6. "Is It Just Me" (Jacobson, Crane) – 3:37
7. "Hurt Me So Bad" – 5:14
8. "Sorry" – 2:54
9. "Piss on Ya" (featuring Monsta Mama) – 5:37
10. "Smell You on Me" (Jacobson, Crane) – 2:17
11. "Snatch and Grab" – 3:52
12. "I Love Work" – 4:13
13. "Speak Your Mind" – 3:42

== Personnel ==
=== Butterfingers ===
- Evil Eddie (Eddie Mark Jacobson) — vocals, guitar, samples, kazoo
- Damien Green — drums, vocals
- Olly Thomas — percussion, samples, vocals, kazoo
- Dave Crane — bass, vocals

=== Additional musicians ===
- Nick 1 — vocals ("Hook Up")
- Monsta Mama — vocals ("Piss on Ya")
- Crystal — horns ("Snatch and Grab" and "I Love Work")
- Selfy — horns ("Snatch and Grab" and "I Love Work")
- Lorraine — cello ("Hurt Me So Bad")
- Elysia Elation — vocals ("I Love Work")
- Matt Murphy — keyboards ("Hook Up")
- Tom Thum — vocals ("Mandarines")
- Deady Stigmata — vocals ("Yo Mama")

=== Production ===
- Magoo — Producer, Engineer, Mixer
- Damien Green — Engineer, Mixer
- Jack the Bear — Mastering

== Charts ==
Chart (2004)	Peak position
Australian Albums (ARIA Charts)	61
