= George (band) =

Australian rock band

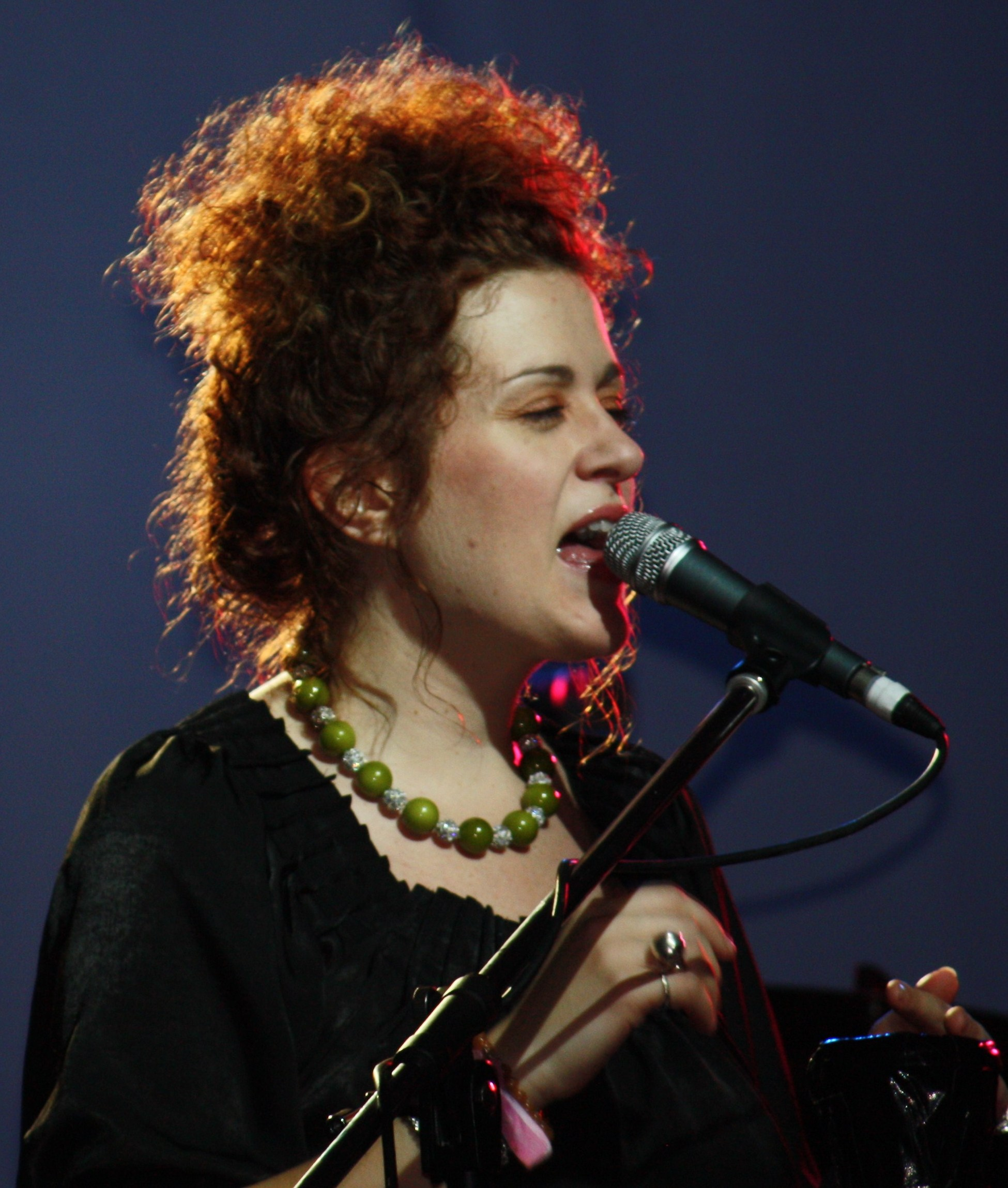

Background information
- Origin: Brisbane, Queensland, Australia
- Genres: Rock
- Years active: 1996–2005 (Reunions: 2016–2017, 2021)
- Label: Festival Mushroom
- Past members: Katie Noonan; Tyrone Noonan; Paulie Bromley; Geoff Green; Nick Stewart; Geoff Hooton; James Stewart

George (stylised as george) were an Australian rock band from Brisbane, Queensland. The band's first album, Polyserena, reached No. 1 on the Australian charts on 17 March 2002.

== Background ==
For most of george's career, the band consisted of Katie Noonan on vocals and keyboards, her brother Tyrone Noonan on vocals, guitar and keyboards, Geoff Green on drums and percussion, Paulie Bromley on bass guitar and Nick Stewart on guitar. Geoff Hooton, a bass guitar player, left the band in early 2000 and was replaced by Bromley. The band was originally founded by the Noonans, Stewart and Stewart's twin brother James Stewart. The latter would leave the band early on, however, to pursue a career in acting.

The Noonans formed the nucleus of the band, doing most of the songwriting and lead vocals. Stewart also contributed to many of the band's tunes. The Noonans grew up with a background in classical music; their mother, Maggie Noonan, is a well-known opera singer. Katie Noonan studied opera and jazz at the Queensland Conservatorium.

Stewart grew up listening to and playing rock music. Bromley played in the underground Brisbane rock band Pangaea with Ben Ely of Regurgitator. Green studied music at the Queensland University of Technology.

== History ==
The band were formed in 1996 to enter a university music competition. They released a series of independent EPs, namely George in 1998, You Can Take What's Mine in 1999 and Bastard Son/Holiday in 2000. Bastard Son/Holiday peaked at number 74 on the ARIA chart. The EPs did progressively better, earning good airplay on Triple J radio and community radio stations across Australia. George were also winning a strong live following throughout Australia.

George signed with Festival Mushroom Records in mid-2001. "Special Ones" was the first single released on Festival Records, followed by "Run" in October 2001 and "Breathe in Now" in February 2002. From this time the band toured heavily.

The band's first album, Polyserena, debuted at No. 1 on the national album charts in its first week; George became only the tenth Australian band to do this with a debut album. Polyserena was certified double platinum and spent 36 weeks in the top 50.

In January 2003, the band joined the Sydney Symphony Orchestra over two nights (23 and 25) to perform Concerto for Group and Orchestra by Jon Lord. The band is the only rock group other than Deep Purple to perform the piece. It was typical of the band's eclectic approach combining classical, rock, funk, jazz and even electronic music.

George released the album Unity in February 2004 and it debuted at No. 5 on the Australian album chart of 1 March 2004. Katie Noonan said on the band's website that the title reflected the band's approach on the album. "That family vibe brings a closeness and honesty that permeates what we do. Collectively and individually, we've been through a great period of change and growth. Knowing we can look to each other for strength brings comfort and solidarity. We have all been through the same thing and there's an incredible sense of union from that experience - that's what being in a band's about."

George performed live in Brisbane on 22 December 2004. Following this, the band took a break while individual members attended to their own projects. While there were no immediate plans to regroup and perform, or to record new material, the band intended to make a comeback at some stage. The band reformed for a performance on the forecourt of the Sydney Opera House on 27 January 2005.

In 2016, the band was announced to perform at Victoria's Queenscliff Music Festival, the band's first performance in 11 years. The band also put on a 20th-anniversary celebration at the Concert Hall, QPAC, during the Brisbane Festival on 9 September 2016. Following their performance at Taronga Zoo in 2017, the group once again folded and returned to their individual careers.

In 2021, the band announced a reunion to play a residency at the Brisbane Powerhouse to play Polyserena in its entirety.

== Discography ==
=== Studio albums ===
List of studio albums, with selected chart positions and certifications
Title	Album details	Peak chart positions	Certifications
Title	Album details	AUS	Certifications
Polyserena	Released: March 2002; Label: Festival Mushroom (334862); Formats: CD	1	ARIA: 2× Platinum
Unity	Released: February 2004; Label: Festival Mushroom (337605); Formats: CD, CD+ DVD	5	ARIA: Gold

=== Compilation albums ===
List of compilation albums, with selected details
Title	Album details
The Essential Hits	Released: August 2010; Label: Warner Music Australia (5249814172); Formats: CD, digital download
The Early Years	Released: 28 September 2016; Label: George; Formats: CD, digital download

=== Extended plays ===
List of EPs, with selected chart positions
Title	EP details	Peak chart positions
Title	EP details	AUS
George	Sometimes referred to as Homebrew; Released: 1998; Label: self-released; Formats: CD	—
You Can Take What's Mine	Released: 1999; Label: self-released (GEO-100); Formats: CD	82
Bastard Son/Holiday	Released: November 2000; Label: Shock (369036); Formats: CD	74

=== Singles ===
Title	Year	Chart positions	Album
Title	Year	AUS	Album
"Special Ones"	2001	29	Polyserena
"Run"	2001	27	Polyserena
"Breathe in Now"	2002	29	Polyserena
"Breaking It Slowly"	2002	43	Polyserena
"Still Real"	2004	37	Unity

== Awards and nomination ==
=== ARIA Music Awards ===
The ARIA Music Awards are annual awards, which recognises excellence, innovation, and achievement across all genres of Australian music. george have been nominated for 8 awards.

Year	Nominee / work	Award	Result
2001	"Special Ones"	Breakthrough Artist - Single	Nominated
2002	Polyserena	Album of the Year	Nominated
2002	Polyserena	Best Group	Nominated
2002	Polyserena	Best Pop Release	Nominated
2002	Polyserena	Breakthrough Artist – Album	Won
2002	David Nicholas and george for Polyserena	Producer of the Year	Nominated
2002	Chris Von Sanden for Polyserena	Best Cover Art	Nominated
2004	Unity	Best Adult Contemporary Album	Nominated
