= Run (George song) =

Single by George

from the album Polyserena
- Released: October 2001
- Recorded: Festival Studios, Sydney
- Genre: Rock, soft rock
- Length: 4:09
- Label: Festival Mushroom Records
- Songwriter: Tyrone Noonan

George singles chronology
"Special Ones" (2001)	"Run" (2001)	"Breathe In Now" (2002)

"Run" is a song from Australian alternative rock group, George. It was released as the second single taken from their debut studio album Polyserena (2002).

== Track listing ==
CD Single (020522)

1. "Run" - 4:09
2. "Holiday" (Live @ The Metro) - 5:00
3. "That's When You Come To Me" (Live @ Roma Street Parklands) - 4:02

== Weekly charts ==
Chart (2001)	Peak position
Australia (ARIA)	27

== Personnel ==
- Bass - Paul B
- Drums - Geoff Green
- Guitar - Nick Stewart
- Vox/ Keys - Tyronne Noonan
- Vox/ Keys - Katie Noonan
