= Breaking It Slowly =

Single by George

from the album Polyserena
- Released: August 2002
- Studio: Festival Studios, Sydney
- Genre: Indie rock, soft rock
- Length: 4:05
- Label: Festival Mushroom
- Songwriter(s): Tyrone Noonan, Nick Stewart
- Producer(s): George, David Nichols

George singles chronology
"Breathe in Now" (2002)	"Breaking It Slowly" (2002)	"Still Real" (2002)

"Breaking It Slowly" is a song by Australian alternative rock group George. It was released as the fourth and final single from their debut studio album Polyserena (2002).

== Track listing ==
CD single (021082)

1. "Breaking It Slowly" – 4:05
2. "Breathe in Now" (Mellow Kt & Piano Solo) – 4:07
3. "Real" (acoustic) – 4:37
4. "Polyserena" (live at the Eclectic Festival, Kings Park, Perth) – 7:30
5. "Release" (live at the Wireless) – 3:42

== Charts ==
Chart (2002)	Peak position
Australia (ARIA)	43
