= Nowhere Without You =

Single by Bob Evans

from the album Suburban Songbook
- B-side: "Another Year Gone", "Two of Us" (Beatles cover version)
- Released: 4 September 2006
- Recorded: 2005–2006
- Genre: Folk pop
- Label: EMI Australia; Capitol Records
- Songwriter: Bob Evans
- Producers: Bob Evans & Brad Jones

Bob Evans singles chronology
"Don't You Think It's Time" (2006)	"Nowhere Without You" (2006)

"Nowhere Without You" is the second single from Kevin Mitchell, under the moniker, Bob Evans, from his second solo album, Suburban Songbook. The song was released on 4 September 2006 and debuted at No. 84 on the ARIA Singles Chart.

== Music video ==
The music video for "Nowhere Without You" features Mitchell playing an old piano and miniature keyboard, which are located in the room of a suburban home. As he is performing the song, various objects become animated, as the video's creators employed puppets to achieve the effect. The video ends with Mitchell swallowed by a couch in the room after the puppet television announces, "And that's all he wrote".

== Media appearances ==
The Ten Network, an Australian television channel, used the song as the soundtrack for a promotional segment for the Australian Recording Industry Association (ARIA) Awards that the network was presenting in 2006; the segment was intermittently featured among the station's regular programming.

== Accolades ==
"Nowhere Without You" was listed at No. 36 on the Hottest 100 in 2006, an annual listeners' poll run by Australian national radio station, Triple J; it also appeared on Triple J's various artists CD, Hottest 100 Volume 14, which was released in 2007.

== Track listing ==
All songs written by Kevin Mitchell (except where noted):

1. "Nowhere Without You" – 4:19
2. "Another Year Gone"
3. "Two of Us" – Paul McCartney & John Lennon
