= The Butterfly Effect (EP) =

EP by The Butterfly Effect
- Released: Late 2001
- Recorded: 2001
- Genre: Alternative metal, nu metal
- Length: 26:23
- Label: Modern Music, Roadshow Music
- Producer: The Butterfly Effect

The Butterfly Effect chronology
The Butterfly Effect (2001)	Begins Here (2003)

The Butterfly Effect is the debut extended play by Australian hard rock group the Butterfly Effect, released in late 2001. This is the only recording by the band to feature bass player Michael Cavendish before he was replaced by Glenn Esmond. While the band's style is mainly alternative metal, it also shows some nu metal in their sound, which is not found on later releases.

"Take It Away" was issued as a single and received high rotation, particularly from national youth radio station, Triple J.

== History ==
The Butterfly Effect formed in Brisbane in 1999 by drummer Ben Hall, guitarist Kurt Goedhart and a few schoolmates. This version played a few live shows in 1999, including one at the Ipswich Racecourse, where Hall met their future lead singer, Clint Boge, after the show. The pair discussed musical ideas for what would become the band's early material and, by mid-2000, Boge had replaced the early vocalist. They released their self-titled debut six-track extended play in late 2001. Jason Ankeny of AllMusic described how "[it] quickly entered steady rotation on the influential Aussie radio outlet Triple J and eventually sold in excess of 10,000 copies." It was re-released in June 2002 via Sony Music Australia.

== Track listing ==
No.	Title	Length
1.	"Black Lung"	4:18
2.	"The Cell"	4:58
3.	"Take It Away"	4:40
4.	"Sweet & Low"	3:15
5.	"Perfection"	4:55
6.	"Pure"	4:15

== Personnel ==
Band

- Clint Boge – lead vocals
- Kurt Goedhart – lead guitar
- Michael Cavendish – bass guitar
- Ben Hall – drums
