= Begins Here =

Studio album by the Butterfly Effect
- Released: 3 August 2003
- Recorded: 2001–2003
- Studio: Modern Music Studios
- Genre: Alternative metal; post-grunge; hard rock
- Length: 46:25
- Label: Modern Music, Roadshow Music, Sony International
- Producer: Dave Leonard and the Butterfly Effect

The Butterfly Effect chronology
The Butterfly Effect EP (2001)	Begins Here (2003)	Imago (2006)

Singles from Begins Here
- 1. "Crave" Released: 2001; 2. "Always" Released: 2004

Professional ratings
Review scores
Source	Rating
AllMusic	link
MusicOHM	link
Rolling Stone (Australia)	link

Begins Here is the debut full-length album by the Brisbane rock band the Butterfly Effect. Begins Here reached number 23 on the ARIA Album Charts, the band's first entry to the top 100, as their first extended play The Butterfly Effect had peaked outside of the top 100.

The album features two tracks that made the Triple J Hottest 100 voted by Triple J listeners. "One Second of Insanity" came 68th in the 2003 Hottest 100 and "Always" came 99th in the 2004 Hottest 100. Some copies of Begins Here were released with the "Always" single as a bonus disc.

The music style of "Begins Here" is a transition in sound between their EP and "Imago" with the EP having an alternative metal sound and "Imago" employing a more progressive rock feel. "Begins Here" contains most of the heaviest material TBE has done so far. After nearly three years of release, in mid-2006 "Begins Here" was certified Gold in Australia, with sales in excess of 35,000 copies.

Flynn Gower, the vocalist of the Australian progressive rock band Cog, makes a guest appearance on the song "Perception Twin".

== Track listing ==
No.	Title	Length
1.	"Intro"	1:59
2.	"Perception Twin" (feat. Flynn Gower)	3:44
3.	"Consequence"	4:28
4.	"One Second of Insanity"	2:22
5.	"Crave"	3:57
6.	"Beautiful Mine"	4:17
7.	"Filling Silence Intro"	1:24
8.	"Filling Silence"	4:40
9.	"Always"	3:58
10.	"Without Wings"	5:33
11.	"Overwhelmed"	3:30
12.	"A.D"	5:09
13.	"Outro"	1:16

== Personnel ==
Band

- Clint Boge – lead vocals
- Kurt Goedhart – lead guitar
- Glenn Esmond – bass guitar
- Ben Hall – drums

== Charts ==
Chart (2003–06)	Peak position
Australian Albums (ARIA)	23

== Certifications ==
Region	Certification	Certified units/sales
Australia (ARIA)	Gold	35,000^{^}
^{^} Shipments figures based on certification alone.
