= Suburban Songbook =

Studio album by Bob Evans
- Released: 10 June 2006
- Recorded: 2005–2006
- Genre: Folk pop
- Length: 42:32
- Labels: EMI Music Australia; Capitol Records
- Producers: Bob Evans, Brad Jones

Bob Evans chronology
Suburban Kid (2003)	Suburban Songbook (2006)	Goodnight, Bull Creek! (2009)

Singles from Suburban Songbook
- 1. "Don't You Think It's Time" Released: 13 May 2006; 2. "Nowhere Without You" Released: 25 September 2006; 3. "Friend" Released: -; 4. "Sadness and Whiskey" Released: June 2007

Professional ratings
Review scores
Source	Rating
The Age	(favorable)
Allmusic	(favorable)
FasterLouder	(very favorable)

Suburban Songbook is the second studio album by Australian singer-songwriter Kevin Mitchell, under the pseudonym Bob Evans, vocalist and guitarist for Perth band Jebediah. It was produced by Brad Jones (Josh Rouse, Yo La Tengo, Sheryl Crow, Jill Sobule) at the 'Alex the Great Studios' in Nashville, Tennessee.

At the 2006 ARIA Awards, Suburban Songbook won the "Best Adult Contemporary Album" and at the J Award of 2006, the album was nominated for Australian Album of the Year. Bob Evans was also nominated for an Australian Music Prize for the album. It debuted at #15 on the ARIA album charts. In October 2010, it was listed in the book, 100 Best Australian Albums. It was also re-released in a deluxe format featuring promotional clips and exclusive footage and audio.

== Background ==
“I wanted to really push the idea and feeling of turning the `Suburban Everyday’ into something of almost fairytale quality,” Mitchell explains. “Of romanticism. That magic can happen in the suburbs every single day. Almost like making a record where within the stories it’s like everything’s happening on Christmas morning. There’s that little hint of magic in the air.” – Kevin Mitchell

== Singles ==
The first single released off the album was "Don't You Think It's Time", and the second was "Nowhere Without You", which debuted at #84 on the Australian ARIA Singles Chart. Both songs had music videos released for them.

The third song released was "Friend", although only as a radio single, the video for which is currently available on YouTube and Yahoo! Music Australia & New Zealand.

The final song lifted from the album was "Sadness and Whiskey", which coincided with Mitchell's national tour of Australia in June and July 2007.

== Track listing ==
All tracks are written by Kevin Mitchell.

No.	Title	{{{extra_column}}}	Length
1.	"Don't You Think It's Time?"		3:19
2.	"Friend"		3:29
3.	"Nowhere Without You"		4:19
4.	"Sadness & Whiskey"		3:12
5.	"Flame"		3:15
6.	"Don't Walk Alone"		4:00
7.	"Rocks in My Head"		4:14
8.	"The Great Unknown"		2:42
9.	"Comin' Around"		3:14
10.	"Battle of 2004"		4:35
11.	"Darlin', Won't You Come?"		3:31
12.	"Me & My Friend"	bonus track	2:42

== Personnel ==
- Kevin Mitchell - vocals, guitar, harmonica, bells, claps, baby piano, mandolin
- Brad Jones - harmonium, bass guitar, piano, guitar, casio, organ, moog synthesizer, mandolin
- Jim Hoke - flute, saxophone, autoharp
- Pete Finney - guitar
- Ken Coomer - drums, tambourine
- Chris Carmichael - cello, viola, violin
- David Henry - cello
- Neil Rosengarden - trumpet, baritone horn, trombone

== Charts ==
Chart (2006–07)	Peak position
Australian Albums (ARIA)	15

== Certifications ==
Region	Certification	Certified units/sales
Australia (ARIA)	Gold	35,000^{^}
^{^} Shipments figures based on certification alone.
