= Butterfingers (Australian band) =

Australian rap rock group

- Origin: Brisbane, Australia
- Genres: Rap rock; hip hop; alternative rock
- Years active: 2001–2009, 2017–present
- Labels: Valley Trash, Festival Mushroom, Warner
- Members: Eddie Mark Jacobson; Olly Thomas; Tony McCall
- Past members: Dave Crane; Damien Green; Brad Cochrane
- Website: http://www.butterfingers.info

Butterfingers are an Australian rap rock group from Brisbane, Queensland. Most of their releases are on their own label, Valley Trash Records. They are currently signed to New World Artists.

== History ==
The group was formed when lead vocalist 'Evil' Eddie Mark Jacobson booked himself in for a gig at The Zoo, a bar in Brisbane, without a band or any intentions of performing solo. The venue held Jacobson's booking to him, and a backing band was assembled featuring DJ/percussionist Olly Thomas, bassist Dave Crane, and drummer Damien Green.

Their first two singles "Everytime" and "I Love Work", reached No. 38 and No. 15 respectively in the Triple J Hottest 100 of 2003.

Their next single "Yo Mama" also received airplay on Triple J with the group's debut album, Breakfast at Fatboys, on its national release, 3 May 2004, awarded Triple J 'Album of the Week'. The album debuted at No. 15 on the ARIA Album charts and was also nominated for the 'Best Independent Release' at the 2004 ARIA Music Awards "Yo Mama" charted at No. 17 in the Triple J Hottest 100 of 2004. In October 2004 Butterfingers scored a Guest Programming spot on rage.

In March 2005 Butterfingers aligned themselves with Festival Mushroom Records through a licensing deal between FMR and Valley Trash, the bands in-house label. Their first (and last) co-release was in June 2005 with the release of the single, "Figjam (Fuck I'm Good, Just Ask Me)". The song peaked at No. 50 and in October 2005, "Figjam" was nominated for 'Best Urban Release' at the 2005 ARIA Music Awards. "Figjam" and the preceding single, "Jesus I Was Evil" (a Darcy Clay cover) charted at No. 11 and No. 69 respectively in the Triple J Hottest 100 of 2005.

The band released a new album, The Deeper You Dig... on 27 May 2006, which peaked at No. 14 on the album chart. A single from the album, "Get Up Outta the Dirt", was released on 3 June 2006. The single peaked at No. 36, and charted at No. 83 in the Triple J Hottest 100 of 2006.

In June 2007 the band won an APRA award - 'Most Performed Urban Work' for "Get Up Outta the Dirt". The group then released "Nothin Much Happens" as a single in October 2007, which landed on Triple J's "hit list" of songs receiving medium to high rotation. A music video was produced for this song and was played on jtv, and on rage, and also Video Hits.

With the band on a presumed hiatus, lead vocalist Eddie Jacobson began performing with Brisbane-based punk band, SpitFireLiar. Jacobson also went on to a solo single under the name Evil Eddie, entitled "Queensland".

To be honest, I’m really gonna focus on the solo thing as much as possible, the other things are all collaborative; the solo thing is gonna be similar to what Butterfingers has previously sounded like. I was submitting a lot of the music for Butterfingers, I haven’t finished it all yet.

— Eddie Jacobson

Jacobson's debut solo album, Welcome to Flavour Country, was released in November 2012.

Butterfingers announced their reformation, alongside releasing a new single "Big Night Out," in March 2017.

They then went on tour to celebrate the 15-year anniversary of Breakfast at Fatboys in 2019, supported by Fresh Violet.

The band released a new album, Bad News, in April 2020.

== Members ==
Current members

- "Evil Eddie" Jacobson − lead vocals, guitar, samples (2001–2009, 2017–present)
- Olly Thomas − keyboards, percussion, samples, turntables, backing vocals (2001–2009, 2017–present)
- Tony McCall − drums, backing vocals (2017–present)

Former members

- Dave Crane – bass guitar (2001–2009)
- Damien Green − drums (2001–2009)
- Brad "Bradzilla" Cochrane − bass guitar (2017–2021)

== Discography ==
=== Albums ===
Title	Details	Peak chart positions
Title	Details	AUS
Breakfast at Fatboys	Released: 3 May 2004; Label: Valley Trash Records (VTCD004); Producer: Magoo	61
The Deeper You Dig...	Released: 20 June 2006; Label: Valley Trash Records (VTCD008); Producer: Magoo & Butterfingers	14
Bad News	Released: April 2020; Label: Bewilderbeats	—
"—" denotes releases that did not chart or were not released in that country.

=== Singles ===
Year	Title	Chart peak positions AUS			Certifications	Album
Year	Title	ARIA Charts	AIR Charts	Hottest 100	Certifications	Album
2003	"Everytime"	—	16	38		Breakfast at Fatboys
2003	"I Love Work"	98	—	15		Breakfast at Fatboys
2005	"Everybodys Jesus"	—	7	69		non-album single
2005	"Figjam"	50	—	11	ARIA: Gold	The Deeper You Dig...
2006	"Get Up Outta the Dirt"	36	—	83		The Deeper You Dig...
2006	"I Like Em When They're Trouble	—	—	—		The Deeper You Dig...
2007	"Nothin' Much Happens"	—	—	—		non-album single
2017	"Big Night Out"	—	—	—		non-album single
2018	"Bullet to the Head"	—	—	—		non-album single
2020	"Dancing (To the Beat of My Own Drum)"	—	—	—		Bad News
2020	"Bad News"	—	—	—		Bad News
"—" denotes releases that did not chart or were not released in that country.

== Awards and nominations ==
=== ARIA Awards ===
The ARIA Music Awards are presented annually since 1987 by the Australian Recording Industry Association (ARIA).

Year	Nominee / work	Award	Result
2004	Breakfast at Fatboys	Best Independent Release	Nominated
2005	"Figjam"	Best Urban Release	Nominated

=== APRA Awards ===
The APRA Awards are presented annually from 1982 by the Australasian Performing Right Association (APRA).

Year	Nominee / work	Award	Result
2007	"Get Up Outta the Dirt" – Eddie Jacobson	Most Performed Urban Work	Won
