= Bastard Son/Holiday =

EP by George
- Released: November 2000
- Genre: Rock music
- Label: Shock Records

George chronology
You Can Take What's Mine (1999)	Bastard Son/Holiday (2000)	Polyserena (2002)

Bastard Son/Holiday, is the third extended play from Brisbane band George. The EP was released in 2000 and peaked at number 74 on the ARIA singles chart in January 2001. The CD came with 2 bonus CD Rom video clips.

== Track listing ==
1. "Bastard Son" (Lunar Mix) - 3:23
2. "Holiday (Just Here For A Few Days...)" - 4:28
3. "Polyserena" (Live) - 4:35
4. "Spawn" (Live) - 4:08
5. "Lizard Lives" (Live) - 3:38
6. "Holiday" (Lunar Mix) - 4:25
1. (CD Rom video) "Spawn"
2. (CD Rom video) "Polyserena"

== Weekly charts ==
Chart (2000/01)	Peak position
Australia (ARIA)	74
