= Dead Letter Circus =

Australian alternative rock band

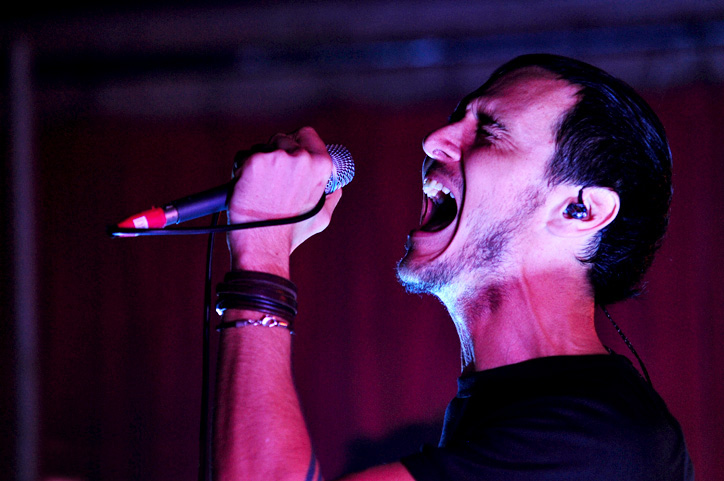
- Dead Letter Circus performing at the 2011 Big Day Out festival.

Background information
- Origin: Brisbane, Queensland, Australia
- Genres: Alternative rock, progressive rock, electronic rock
- Years active: 2004–2020
- Labels: UNFD, 3Massive Records/MGM, Warner Music Australia, Sumerian Records (North America), The End Records (North America), Rise Records
- Spinoff of: Ochre
- Past members: Kim Benzie; Luke Williams; Stewart Hill; Clint Vincent; Luke Palmer; Scott Davey; Rob Maric; Tom Skerlj
- Website: Dead Letter Circus

Dead Letter Circus was an Australian alternative rock band from Brisbane, Queensland. Their 2010 debut album This Is the Warning debuted at No. 2 on the Australian album charts and spawned a number of singles that were played heavily on radio, and was later certified Gold and voted by listeners into triple j's Hottest 100 Albums of All Time, at number 86. The band released a further three albums: 2013's The Catalyst Fire, 2015's Aesthesis and 2018's Dead Letter Circus.

== History ==
=== 2004–2008: Formation and self-titled EP ===
Three members of the defunct Brisbane band Ochre formed Dead Letter Circus in late 2004, releasing one self-titled EP, and the singles "Disconnect and Apply", "Next in Line" and "The Space on the Wall". "Disconnect and Apply" received significant radio play on Triple J, where it became one of their most played tracks. They performed at the Big Day Out, Come Together Music Festival in Sydney and the Over-Cranked Music Festival in Brisbane - performing with bands such as Judas Priest, Cog, Karnivool, The Butterfly Effect, Chevelle and Helmet. They also toured Australia extensively on their own headline tours.

In 2008, drummer Scott Davey left the group and was replaced by Luke Williams from Melodyssey. On 30 October 2008, Dead Letter Circus began their Next in Line tour to coincide with the release of the single, playing primarily with Australian bands Melodyssey (still featuring Williams) and Rook. On 29 November 2008, they performed at Coffs Harbour's Open Arms Festival in NSW.

On 4 September 2009, Dead Letter Circus released the single "The Space on the Wall", supported by a national tour with guest bands Sydonia and Many Machines on Nine. Following a showcase at Musexpo, Dead Letter Circus signed with Warner Bros. Records in Australia and New Zealand and CAA for live bookings in North America, and toured the eastern states of Australia in late January through to early March 2010.

=== 2010–2011: This Is the Warning ===
On 16 February 2010, Dead Letter Circus revealed via MySpace that their debut album was complete. he band announced a This Is the Warning album launch tour, playing shows in most major capital cities in Australia through April - June 2010. The album was released on 14 May 2010, titled This Is the Warning. It had its debut at Number 2 on the ARIA Album Chart.

Dead Letter Circus supported Muse at their Brisbane shows on 5 and 6 December 2010. They also supported Linkin Park on their Sydney and Melbourne shows on their A Thousand Suns World Tour. In early 2011 they played another headline tour of Australian capital cities with Floating Me.

In May 2011, it was announced that the band had signed a deal with Sumerian Records to release This Is The Warning in North America. On 9 May 2011, This is the Warning was released in the US, with a short UK tour in June and July to promote the release. The band later extended summer tour into the US, supporting Animals As Leaders in a 24-city national tour from July to August.

Afterwards, the band returned to Australia for a 21 date national tour to raise awareness about the dangers of coal seam gas titled the "No Fracking Way Tour". Rob Maric explained the theme of the tour, stating, "it's important to everyone. The planet is descending into complete self-destruction. Musicians have a fortunate position of influence so it's a good opportunity to just say to a large amount of people 'hey, check out this topic'. I respect artists more than politicians so when they speak, I tend to listen."

=== 2012–2014: The Catalyst Fire ===
The band started work on a new album in early 2012. According to Benzie, the album may take a more electronic approach than This Is the Warning;, stating "I think we're kind of in a cyborg half-human, half-robot stage at the moment. Yeah, I definitely think we could (be going in an electronic direction). We're leaning toward a bigger, fatter sound, rather than just the guitars." Benzie also stated that thematically, the album would explore the issues of the first album, but build on those as if it were a second chapter in a first person narrative; "Most of the next one’s going to be a bit of the after-effect: how can you combat things like that (not feeling in control of your own life)? How can small people deceive world bankers? The answer will actually be everyone – what everyone does within their individual bubble, how we choose to act, and if that will butterfly effect out." Benzie also said the band aims to have a worldwide release by the end of 2012.

In an interview with Chemical Magazine in early 2012, they stated that they hope to go into the studio near the beginning of March and have stated that the new album will have a similar feel to songs like "Cage" "This Long Hour" and "The Space on the Wall". Via their Facebook page, "Our new single 'Wake Up' was officially added to rotation on triple j radio today! If you are keen to hear it then simply drop a request between 6–9pm weeknights." On 1 May 2012, the band released "Wake Up" as a free download on their website.

The band performed at a concert in India during November, at Waves '12, a cultural festival of the BITS Pilani, K.K. Birla Goa Campus.

In early January 2013, guitarist and founding member Rob Maric announced he would leave the band. Maric had been largely absent from the band's activities in 2012 and decided he would not return. On 8 January 2013, the band announced Clint Vincent from Melodyssey as the "new guy". The 8th happened to be Vincent's birthday, with the post stating it was the "perfect time for an introduction." The group immediately went on to perform at the Big Day Out festival (Gold Coast only) on 19 January and the Breath of Life festival in Tasmania in March, before heading off on a limited national tour.

The band signed with record label UNFD in April 2013, to release the second album. On 28 June, Dead Letter Circus announced their second studio album titled The Catalyst Fire was due for release on 9 August 2013. On 5 July, Dead Letter Circus released the new video for their single "Lodestar", directed by Lori Balotti.

On 29 August 2014, preceding 4 sold out acoustic shows, Dead Letter Circus released a surprise acoustic EP titled Stand Apart which contained 6 re-imagined songs from The Catalyst Fire.

=== 2015–2017: Aesthesis ===
On 20 February, Dead Letter Circus teased their third album on their official Twitter page. Following that post, several different posts were released featuring the band working on their third album. On 8 May, Dead Letter Circus released a new single entitled "While You Wait".

On 10 July, Dead Letter Circus announced on their Facebook page that their third album, Aesthesis, will be released in Australia and New Zealand on 14 August 2015. It debuted at No. 2 on the ARIA Albums Chart on 22 August.

=== 2017–2019: The Endless Mile and self-titled album ===
In February 2017, the band announced The Endless Mile, an album including reimaginations of songs from their back catalogue, including from their self-titled first EP. In March, the band announced that a new studio album of original material would follow. The band began recording in August 2017 with Forrester Savell.

The band's self-titled fourth studio album was released on 21 September 2018. At the ARIA Music Awards of 2019, Dead Letter Circus was nominated for ARIA Award for Best Hard Rock or Heavy Metal Album.

== Musical style and influences ==
The band have cited rock acts such as Tool, Deftones, Soundgarden, Radiohead and Pearl Jam as influences on the band, while also crediting electronic artists such as Massive Attack, Nine Inch Nails and UNKLE. The band, however, acknowledges that "while we don't sound like a mash up of these bands, they have all definitely infused our minds with a love for writing epic, layered and high energy songs."

The creative process has been described as spontaneous and improvisational, with the band often finishing the structure of content of songs in the recording studio. According to Benzie, "the guys are very much improvisational players. If we have a basic structure, what we do generally is Rob and I create the seeds [of the songs], and we'll take them with the band into the studio and just jam around it – record everything and then have a listen and then put the bits together. We developed this knack of finding out which songs are flowing. We don’t ever write whole songs before we go into the studio. We generally take the seeds of songs."

Allmusic has described the band's sound as "delay-based guitar textures...interlaced with subtle synth undercurrents, creating complex patterns out of a set of simple rhythms without cutting down on melody...executed with a surgical precision that recalls the incarnation of Krautrock promoted by Maserati -- while the sheer intensity brings to mind God Is an Astronaut more than My Chemical Romance." The Sydney Morning Herald describes the band as "frenetic rock" but within it "lies a clarity and self-assuredness punctuated by Maric's undulating guitar work and Benzie's vocals. The songs also have a positive message, led by Benzie's state of mind." They have been compared to The Mars Volta and Karnivool as well.

== Members ==
Final line-up

- Kim Benzie – lead vocals, keyboards, auxiliary percussion (2005–2020)
- Stewart Hill – bass (2005–2020)
- Luke Williams – drums, percussion, backing vocals (2009–2020)
- Clint Vincent – lead guitar (2013–2020)
- Luke Palmer - rhythm guitar (2015–2020)

Former members

- Scott Davey – drums, percussion, backing vocals (2005–2009)
- Rob Maric – lead guitar (2005–2012), rhythm guitar (2005–2011)
- Tom Skerlj – rhythm guitar, keyboards, auxiliary percussion (2011–2015)

Timeline

== Discography ==
=== Studio albums ===
List of studio albums, with selected chart positions and certifications
| Title | Album details | Peak chart positions | Certifications |
| Title | Album details | AUS | Certifications |
|---|---|---|---|
| This Is the Warning | Released: May 2010; Label: Warner Music Australia; Formats: CD, CD+DVD, digital download, 2xLP | 2 | ARIA: Gold |
| The Catalyst Fire | Released: August 2013; Label: UNFD; Formats: CD, digital download, LP | 2 | |
| Aesthesis | Released: August 2015; Label: UNFD; Formats: CD, digital download, LP | 2 | |
| The Endless Mile | Released: May 2017; Label: Ten to Two Records, Sony Music Australia; Formats: CD, digital download, LP | 27 | |
| Dead Letter Circus | Released: September 2018; Label: BMG; Formats: CD, digital download, LP | 10 | |

=== EPs ===
List of EPs, with selected chart positions and certifications
| Title | Album details | Peak chart positions | Certifications |
| Title | Album details | AUS | Certifications |
|---|---|---|---|
| Dead Letter Circus | Released: 2007; Label: 3 Massive Records; Formats: CD | | |
| Next in Line | Released: 2008; Label: 3 Massive Records; Formats: CD | | |
| Stand Apart | Released:2014; Label: We Are Unified; Formats: CD, digital download | 24 | |

=== Singles ===
| Title | Year | Peak chart positions | Album |
| Title | Year | AUS | Album |
|---|---|---|---|
| "Disconnect and Apply" | 2005 | — | Dead Letter Circus |
| "Reaction" | 2008 | — | Next in Line |
| "Next in Line" | 2008 | 87 | Next in Line |
| "The Space on the Wall" | 2009 | — | This Is the Warning |
| "Big" | 2010 | — | This Is the Warning |
| "One Step" | 2010 | — | This Is the Warning |
| "Cage" | 2010 | — | This Is the Warning |
| "Reaction" | 2011 | — | This Is the Warning |
| "Wake Up" | 2012 | — | Non-album single |
| "Lodestar" | 2013 | — | The Catalyst Fire |
| "I Am" | 2013 | — | The Catalyst Fire |
| "While You Wait" | 2015 | — | Aethesis |
| "In Plain Sight" | 2015 | — | Aethesis |
| "The Armour You Own" | 2018 | — | Dead Letter Circus |
| "The Real You" | 2018 | — | Dead Letter Circus |

== Awards and nominations ==
=== AIR Awards ===
The Australian Independent Record Awards (commonly known informally as AIR Awards) is an annual awards night to recognise, promote and celebrate the success of Australia's Independent Music sector.

| Year | Nominee / work | Award | Result |
|---|---|---|---|
| 2017 | Aesthesis | Best Independent Hard Rock, Heavey or Punk Album | Nominated |

=== ARIA Music Awards ===
The ARIA Music Awards are a set of annual ceremonies presented by Australian Recording Industry Association (ARIA), which recognise excellence, innovation, and achievement across all genres of the music of Australia. They commenced in 1987.

| Year | Nominee / work | Award | Result | Ref. |
|---|---|---|---|---|
| 2010 | This Is the Warning | Best Hard Rock or Heavy Metal Album | Nominated | |
| 2015 | Aesthesis | Best Rock Album | Nominated | |
| 2019 | Dead Letter Circus | Best Hard Rock or Heavy Metal Album | Nominated | |

=== Queensland Music Awards ===
The Queensland Music Awards (previously known as Q Song Awards) are annual awards celebrating Queensland, Australia's brightest emerging artists and established legends. They commenced in 2006.

| Year | Nominee / work | Award | Result (wins only) |
|---|---|---|---|
| 2019 | "The Armour You Own" | Heavy Song of the Year | Won |
