= The Butterfly Effect (band) =

Australian rock band

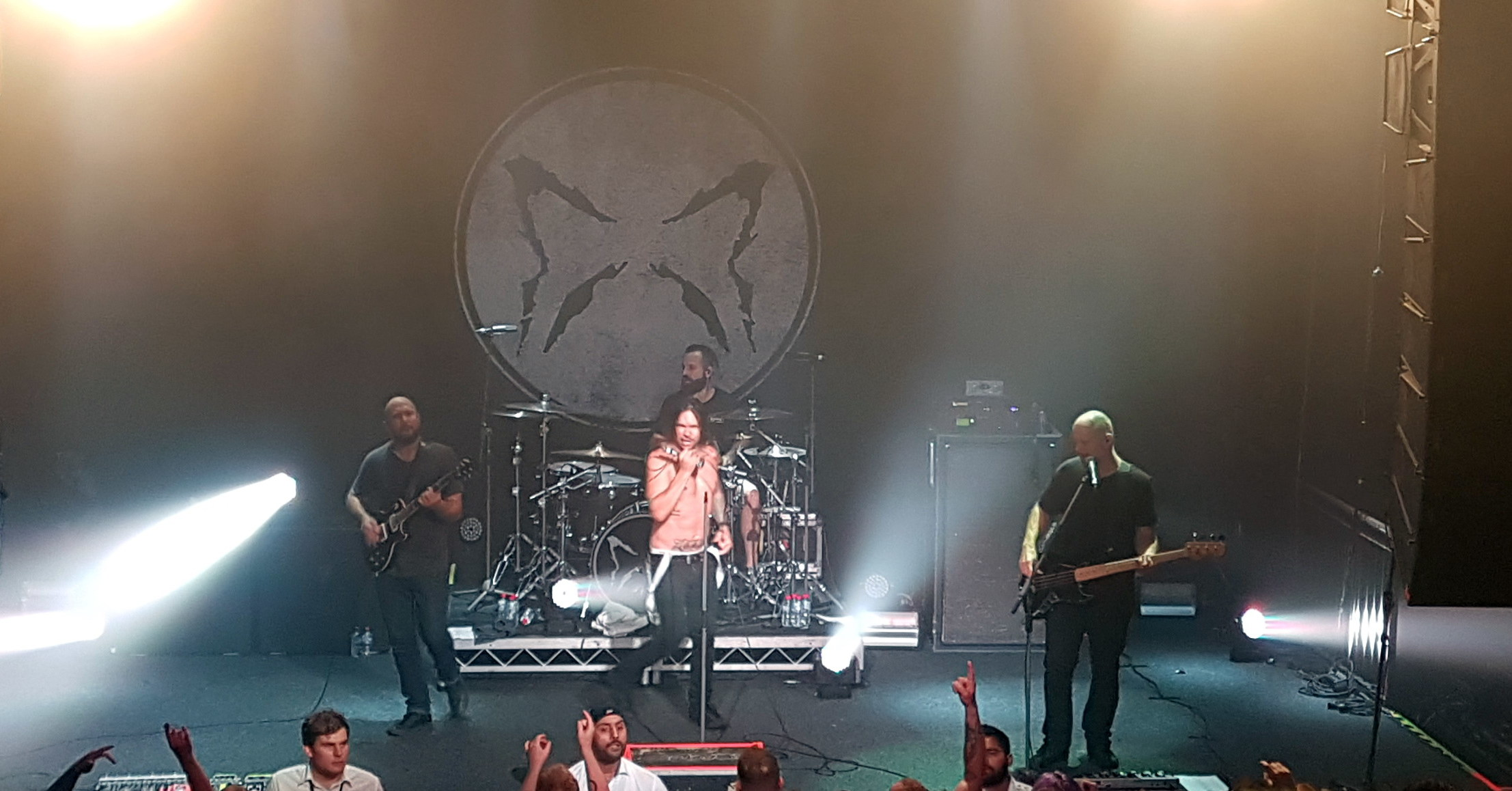
- The Butterfly Effect in 2018

Background information
- Origin: Brisbane, Queensland, Australia
- Genres: Alternative rock; alternative metal; art rock; progressive rock
- Years active: 1999–2016, 2017–present
- Labels: Modern; Roadshow; Superball; Collision Course
- Members: Clint Boge; Ben Hall; Glenn Esmond; Kurt Goedhart
- Past members: Paul Gallagher; Michael Cavendish
- Website: thebutterflyeffectband.com.au

The Butterfly Effect are an Australian rock band from Brisbane formed in 1999. The band released a self-titled debut EP in 2001, and then three full-length albums afterwards; Begins Here in 2003, Imago in 2006, and Final Conversation of Kings in 2008. During this time, the band consisted of Clint Boge on lead vocals, Kurt Goedhart on guitar, Glenn Esmond on bass, and Ben Hall on drums. After struggling for years to work on a fourth studio album, Boge left the band in 2012 due to personal and creative differences. The remaining members recruited Brisbane-based singer Paul Galagher for a final single and tour before announcing their breakup in 2016. In July 2017, the band announced their reunion as well as a headlining tour scheduled to take place in March 2018. In 2022, the band released their fourth studio album, IV.

== History ==
=== 1999–2002: Formation and self-titled EP ===
The band first formed in 1999, consisting of drummer Ben Hall, guitarist Kurt Goedhart and a few schoolmates. The band in this form played a few live shows in 1999, most notably one at the Ipswich Racecourse, where Hall met future lead singer Clint Boge after the show. The two discussed musical ideas for what would become the band's first release of music, and by Winter 2000, Boge replaced the band's prior vocalist. The band released their self-titled debut EP in 2001.

Two singles were released from the album, "Take it Away" and "Crave", both receiving extensive airplay on Australian radio station Triple J. The band toured extensively throughout 2002 in support of the album, with the band recruiting final long-term member Glenn Esmond as a bassist, and then playing the Rapid Festival, the Shihad Tour, and the 2002 edition of the Big Day Out festival. The single's and tour lead to band's EP, an independent release, to exceed over 10,000 copies sold. After being featured as Triple J's "Unsigned Find" of 2002, the band signed to record labels "Roadshow Music" and "Rough Cut Publishing", and began working on a full-length album.

=== 2003–2005: Begins Here ===
In November 2002 the band released "Crave", the first single from their debut album. It debuted on the ARIA Charts at No. 59 and also achieved No. 1 on the independent charts. YTB

The Butterfly Effect spent November 2002 to March 2003 recording their debut album, Begins Here, at Modern Music Studios in Brisbane, Australia. The album was released in Australia on 4 August 2003. It debuted at No. 24 on the ARIA Charts and again topped the independent charts. It remained in the charts for 56 weeks in total. To date, it has sold over 30,000 copies.

Distribution deals saw the album being released by RSK in the UK, Sony in Germany, and Suburban in Belgium, the Netherlands and Luxembourg. The band started to garner attention in Europe, with mentions in media including Metal Hammer, Rock Sound, Classic rock, Kerrang!, Metal Hammer Germany and Aardshock. In August 2004 the band did a six-week tour through Germany, Austria, Switzerland, Czech Republic, the Netherlands and the UK. From September to November The Butterfly Effect played 32 shows in 40 days. Album sales have now exceeded 10,000 units in the UK and Europe, and the band has also had some success in South Africa.

During 2005, the band recorded a new single titled "Phoenix" featuring Ken Malaxos on banjo and Christo Stamoulis in backing vocals. It was released in September, and a film clip was also made.

During October and November the band toured Australia, playing some material from their forthcoming second album, Imago, which was released in Australia during July 2006.

=== 2006–2007: Imago ===
The band finished recording their second studio album, titled Imago, in early 2006 and it was released on 17 June 2006. It debuted at No. 2 in the ARIA Chart for Weekly Top 100 highest-selling music albums. Their previous album, Begins Here, was released in the US through hard rock record label Megaforce Records. The band commenced the Imago tour around Australia in July.

In mid-2006, after nearly three years since its release Begins Here was certified gold in Australia, exceeding sales of 35,000 copies. Shortly afterwards, Imago also attained the same status, only this time it reached the gold mark in only eight weeks, including debuting at No. 2 on the ARIA album charts.

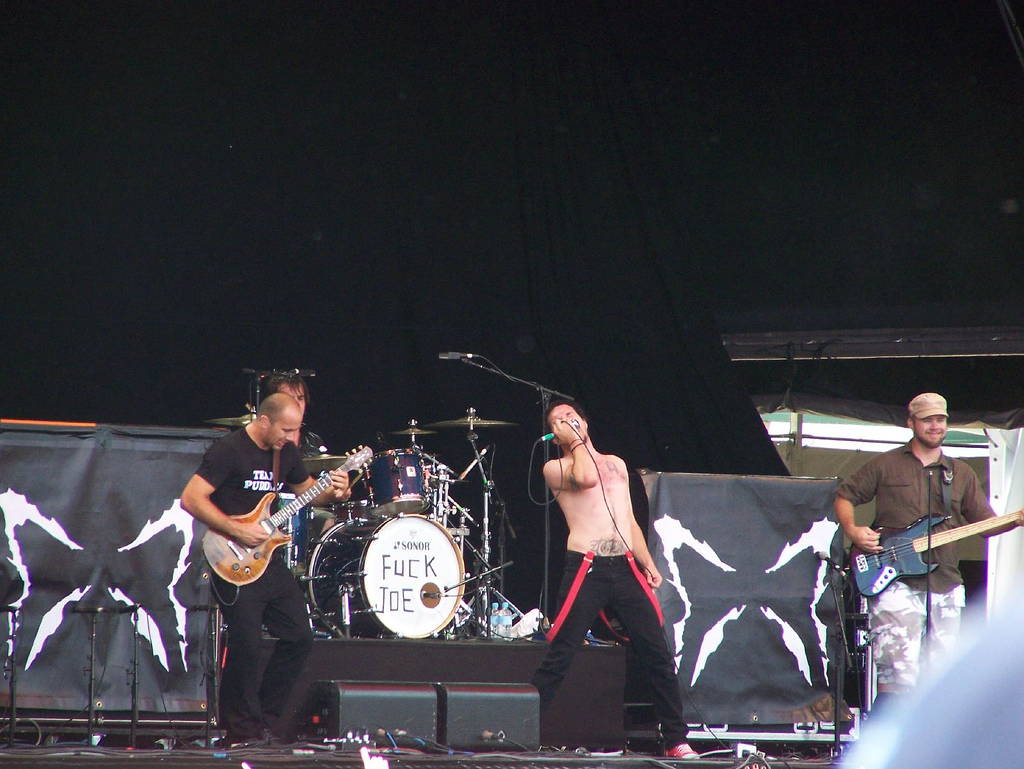
The Butterfly Effect on stage at the 2007 Big Day Out festival

Following the release of Imago, The Butterfly Effect spent the remainder of the year touring the record including an appearance on the 2007 Big Day Out festival tour. Shortly after, work began on material for the follow-up album. In July 2007, the band undertook the In a Memory Tour, with Chicago's Chevelle and upcoming Brisbane act Dead Letter Circus. On this tour, they previewed ' 7 Days' and 'Rain '. In early 2008, the Home Alone Tour was announced to fill in time before the recording of the new record. The tour, previewed additional new songs called "The Hidden" and "In These Hands".

=== 2008–2009: Final Conversation of Kings ===
Recording of the album began in March 2008. The album, Final Conversation of Kings, was released in Australia on 20 September. The cover and booklet art was illustrated by Monaux. It debuted on the ARIA Charts at No. 3. On 14 July the band's first single Window and the Watcher was debuted on radio station Triple J, with the single being released on 23 August. After the release of the album, The Butterfly Effect set off on a tour of Australia spanning October and November, with support from Melbourne acts Trial Kennedy and Sleep Parade. They also performed as part of the Big Day Out 2009 festival, headlining the Converse Essential stage.

=== 2010–2016: Aborted fourth album and breakup ===
Initial plans after wrapping up touring in support of Final Conversation of Kings involved writing and demoing material for a fourth album in 2010 and releasing it in early 2011. The band would also tour during this time, performing the "Four Wheels and a Heartbeat" tour in 2010, where they even played new material, most notably a track entitled "Five Golden Rings" in full. Despite this, the band would privately struggle to work on the album for over three years. The band went through extended periods of tension and frustration, with members, most notably Boge with the rest of the band, not getting along. Boge desired for the band to return to their heavier, earlier sound of the initial EP and Begins Here album. Conversely, the rest of the band wanted to push forward even further into progressive territory, as they had with Final Conversation of Kings album, and incorporate further unconventional instruments for rock music into their songs, such as mandolin or bells.

After months of the band struggling with their work on the album or get along with one another, in mid-September 2011, Boge privately announced to the band that he would be leaving. However, with the internal struggles being entirely unknown to the general public at the time, the band kept it secret until February 2012, where, in press release, they announced that Boge had left amicably to pursue other interests. In the meantime, the band participated in a number of "Tenth Anniversary" concerts through October 2011, where the band felt a large sense of relief, knowing that there was an end to their internal struggles, and being able to focus on playing music rather than create it. This cemented their view on Boge leaving, but also inspired them to do one last tour together; in February 2012, upon announcing Boge's departure, they also announced that they would do a farewell tour, and release a "Greatest Hits" album, both entitled Effected.

The tour ran from April to June 2012. During the time, Boge expanded more on why he left, and the band's turmoil. Boge described resentment of the official press release, stating that calling it "amicable" was "bullshit", and that it entirely came down to members not getting along or respecting him. He blamed himself as well, stating:

"'If I've lost the faith from my bandmates to produce what I think are the best melodies...' and to have that trust taken away, then I couldn't go on working like that. Not only that, but I don't want to be the weak link in a band. I don't want to be the guy that's not pulling his weight. That was another reason, too. I thought, 'If that was the case, I've got to go."

After the band's farewell tour concluded in June 2012, Boge left the band and worked with his other band, Thousand Needles in Red, while the remaining three members started the search for a new lead singer in order to resume work on a fourth studio album.

In August 2013, the band released their DVD Effected, a two-DVD set featuring a live recording of the Melbourne show of the Effected tour and a documentary outlining the band's career and internal struggles up until that point. The DVD debuted at No. 1 on the ARIA music DVD chart.

In September 2013, the band announced an Australian tour for October, shortly after announcing Paul Galagher as the band's new lead singer. The band released their first and only single with Galagher entitled "Eyes Down", at the same time. After a second period of years of public silence and inactivity, the band officially announced their disbandment in August 2016.

=== 2017–present: Reunion and IV ===
In July 2017, the band announced the reformation of their original lineup, with Boge again as the lead singer, and announced they would begin touring Australia again in March 2018.

In June 2022, the band announced their fourth album, IV, would be released in late 2022 and that they would tour Australia in September and October 2022. In August 2023, the band announced a 20th anniversary tour for Begins Here to take place in February 2024.

== Band members ==
=== Current members ===
- Kurt Goedhart – guitar (1999–2016, 2017–present)
- Ben Hall – drums (1999–2016, 2017–present)
- Clint Boge – lead vocals, occasional guitar (2000–2012, 2017–present)
- Glenn Esmond – bass guitar, backing vocals (2002–2016, 2017–present)

=== Former members ===
- Michael Cavendish – bass guitar (1999–2002)
- Paul Gallagher – lead vocals (2013–2016)

== Discography ==
=== Studio albums ===
List of studio albums, with selected details and chart positions
| Title | Details | Peak chart positions | Certifications |
| Title | Details | AUS | Certifications |
|---|---|---|---|
| Begins Here | Released: August 2003; Label: Modern; Formats: CD, digital download | 23 | ARIA: Gold |
| Imago | Released: June 2006; Label: Modern; Formats: CD, digital download | 2 | ARIA: Gold |
| Final Conversation of Kings | Released: September 2008; Label: Roadshow Music; Formats: CD, digital download | 3 | ARIA: Gold |
| IV | Released: 2 September 2022; Label: Formats: CD, digital download | 5 | |

=== Compilation albums ===
List of Compilation albums, with details
| Title | Details |
|---|---|
| Effected | Released: 2012; Label: Roadshow Music; Formats: CD, Digital download |
| B-Sides, Live and Rarities | Released: October 2016; Label: Collision Course; Formats: Digital download |

=== EPs ===
List of EP, with details
| Title | Details |
|---|---|
| The Butterfly Effect EP | Released: 2001; Label: Roadshow Music; Formats: CD, digital download |

=== Singles ===
List of singles, with selected chart positions
| Title | Year | Peak chart positions | Album |
| Title | Year | AUS | Album |
|---|---|---|---|
| "Crave" | 2001 | 59 | Begins Here |
| "Always" | 2004 | 49 | Begins Here |
| "A Slow Descent" | 2006 | 9 | Imago |
| "Gone" | 2006 | 44 | Imago |
| "Reach" | 2007 | 74 | Imago |
| "Window and the Watcher" | 2008 | — | Final Conversation of Kings |
| "Unbroken" | 2019 | — | IV |
| "So Tired" | 2021 | — | IV |
| "Nil by Mouth" | 2022 | — | IV |
| "Visiting Hours" | 2022 | — | IV |
