= Special Ones =

Single by George

from the album Polyserena
- Released: 11 June 2001
- Recorded: Festival Studios, Sydney
- Genre: Rock, soft rock
- Length: 3:48
- Label: Festival Mushroom Records
- Songwriters: Katie Noonan and Nick Stewart
- Producer: David Nicholas

George singles chronology
"Special Ones" (2001)	"Run" (2001)

"Special Ones" is the debut single from Australian alternative rock group, George. It followed the release of three extended plays and was the first single taken from their debut studio album Polyserena (2002).

At the ARIA Music Awards of 2001, the song was nominated for 'Breakthrough Artist – Single', losing out to "Frontier Psychiatrist" by The Avalanches.

== Track listing ==
CD Single (020432)

1. "Special Ones" - 3:48
2. "She Smiles" (Live) - 6:10
3. "Under the Milky Way" (Live) - 4:34
4. "Spawn" (Future Funk Squad Bass Drop Remix) - 6:30
- CD Rom (including the video for "Bastard Son")
- Tracks 2 & 3: Recorded live at The Healer, Brisbane, Australia
- "Under The Milky Way" originally by The Church was covered by george for Triple J on 3 November 2000.

== Weekly charts ==
Chart (2001)	Peak position
Australia (ARIA)	29

== Personnel ==
- Arranged by [Special Ones Horn Arrangement] – Katie Noonan
- Artwork, Design – Chris von Sanden
- Design [CD ROM Design] – Dimity Mapstone
- Engineer [Assistant] – Evan McHugh (tracks: 1), Justin Tresidder (tracks: 1)
- French Horn – Liza Willcock (tracks: 1), Olly Redfearn (tracks: 1)
- Performer [George], Bass [Basses] – Paulie B
- Performer [George], Drums – Geoff Green
- Performer [George], Guitar [Guitars] – Nick Stewart
- Performer [George], Vocals [Vox], Keyboards [Keys] – Katie Noonan, Tyrone Noonan
