= Next in Line (Dead Letter Circus song) =

Single by Dead Letter Circus

from the album Next in Line
- Released: November 2008
- Recorded: Loose Stones, Gold Coast & The Base, Melbourne
- Genre: Alternative rock, progressive rock
- Length: 3:23
- Label: MGM Distribution
- Songwriter(s): Kim Benzie, Stewart Hill, Rob Maric, Forrester Savell, Luke Williams
- Producer(s): Forrester Savell, Matt Bartlem and Dead Letter Circus

Dead Letter Circus singles chronology
"Reaction" (2008)	"Next in Line" (2008)	"The Space on the Wall" (2009)

"Next in Line" is a song by Australian progressive/alternative rock band Dead Letter Circus. It was released in November 2008 as the second single from the band's second EP Next in Line.

== Track listing ==
No.	Title	Length
1.	"Next in Line"	3:23
2.	"Reaction"	3:44
3.	"Tremors"	3:38
Total length:		10:45

Exclusive iTunes bonus track
No.	Title	Length
4.	"Inferiority Complex" (Remixed by Mammal)	3:40
Total length:		14:25

== Notes ==
1. The version of the single from the iTunes Store, had an exclusive bonus track called "Inferiority Complex". This track is a remix of the song "Disconnect and Apply" from Dead Letter Circus' self-titled EP. The remix was done by Australian funk rock band Mammal and features vocals by Mammal's vocalist Ezekiel Ox.

== Charts ==
Chart (2008)	Peak position
Australia (ARIA Charts)	87
