= Polyserena =

Studio album by george
- Released: March 2002
- Recorded: 2001
- Studio: Mangrove Studios, Gosford, Australia
- Genre: Folk; pop rock; folk rock
- Label: Festival Mushroom; Warner Bros.
- Producer: David Nicholas; George

George chronology
Bastard Son/Holiday (2000)	Polyserena (2002)	Unity (2004)

Singles from Polyserena
- 1. "Special Ones" Released: 11 June 2001; 2. "Run" Released: October 2001; 3. "Breathe in Now" Released: 28 January 2002; 4. "Breaking It Slowly" Released: August 2002

Polyserena is the 2002 debut studio album by Australian band George. Polyserena debuted atop the national albums chart. George became only the tenth Australian band to do so with a debut album. It achieved gold record status within ten days, and platinum record status within three weeks. By the end of 2002, the album had gone double platinum.

== Track listing ==
1. "Release"
2. "Breaking It Slowly"
3. "Special Ones"
4. "Rain"
5. "Truth"
6. "Bastard Son"
7. "Strange Days"
8. "Chemical Dreams"
9. "Sellout"
10. "Run"
11. "Breathe in Now"
12. "That's When You Come to Me"
13. "Spawn"

== Charts and certifications ==
=== Weekly charts ===
Chart (2002)	Peak position
Australian Albums (ARIA)	1

=== Year-end charts ===
Chart (2002)	Position
Australian Albums Chart	8
Australian Artist Albums Chart	3

=== Certifications ===
Region	Certification	Certified units/sales
Australia (ARIA)	2× Platinum	140,000^{^}
^{^} Shipments figures based on certification alone.
