= Tyrone Noonan =

Australian musician

Tyrone ("Ty") Noonan is an Australian musician, best known for his vocals, guitars, keyboards and songwriting in the Brisbane band George.

He has also worked as a composer for Australian theatre companies La Boite and Queensland Theatre Company. In 2005 following George's disbanding, Noonan began pursuing a solo career. In 2006, Noonan released his debut EP Heavy Soul Part I.

== Discography ==
=== Studio albums ===
Title	Details
I Believe	Release date: August 2011; Label: Frontal Lobe Productions (FLP001); Formats: CD, DD
Utopia	Release date: 23 October 2020; Label: Tyrone Noonan; Formats: DD, streaming

=== Extended plays ===
Title	Details
Heavy Soul Part 1	Release date: 2006; Label: Jellyfish Music (JFM008); Formats: CD, DD
I'm a Believer	Release date: 2011; Label: Frontal Lobe Productions; Formats: DD

== Awards ==
=== Queensland Music Awards ===
The Queensland Music Awards (previously known as Q Song Awards) are annual awards celebrating Queensland, Australia's brightest emerging artists and established legends. They commenced in 2006.

Year	Nominee / work	Award	Result (wins only)
2008	"The Family Song"	Gospel / Spiritual Song of the Year	Won
