= Live Earth concert, Sydney =

Concert event

Live Earth
- Sydney Concert location
Location	Sydney Football Stadium, Sydney, Australia
Founded by	Al Gore and Kevin Wall; Promoted in Australia by Michael Chugg, Amanda Pelman of Chugg Entertainment, Joe Segreto & Tom Lang of IMC / Homebake Festival and Mark Pope of Mark Pope Music.
Date	7 July 2007
Genre(s)	Pop and Rock music
Website	Live Earth Australia Site

The Live Earth concert in Australia was held at Sydney Football Stadium, Sydney on 7 July 2007, in front of around 45,000 people. It was the first of the Live Earth concerts to kick off the day-long event and promoted by Michael Chugg and Amanda Pelman of Chugg Entertainment, Joe Segreto and Tom Lang of IMC / Homebake Festival and Mark Pope of Mark Pope Music.

== Running order ==
- Indigenous Australians (welcoming ceremony) (S 11:10)
- Blue King Brown – "Resist", "Don't Let Go", "Water", "Stand Up", "Come and Check Your Head" (S 11:55)
- Angela Bishop (presenter) (S 12:30)
- Toni Collette & the Finish – "This Moment is Golden", "Johnny's Lips", "Cowboy Games", "Tender Hooks", "Look Up", "Children of the Revolution" (S 12:35)
- Tim Ross (presenter) (S 13:20)
- Sneaky Sound System – "Thin Disguise", "Pictures", "Hip Hip Hooray", "I Love It", "Goodbye", "UFO" (S 13:25)
- Adam Spencer (presenter) (S 14:10)
- Ghostwriters – "Wreckery Road", "Start the Day", "World is Almost at Peace", "Ready Steady Go", "When the Generals Talk", "Second Skin" (S 14:15)
- Jimmy Barnes (presenter) (S 15:00)
- Paul Kelly – "God Told Me To", "Before Too Long", "Deeper Water", "How to Make Gravy", "From Little Things Big Things Grow" (with Kev Carmody, Missy Higgins and John Butler) (S 15:05)
- Hamish & Andy (presenter) (S 15:50)
- Eskimo Joe – "From the Sea", "Older Than You", "Comfort You", "New York", "London Bombs", "Breaking Up", "How Does It Feel", "Sarah", "Black Fingernails, Red Wine" (S 15:55)
- Richard Wilkins (presenter) (S 16:40)
- Missy Higgins – "Secret", "This Is How It Goes", "Where I Stood", "Warm Whispers", "The Special Two", "Peachy", "Scar", "Steer" (S 16:45)
- Ian Thorpe (presenter) (S 17:20)
- The John Butler Trio – "Zebra", "Better Than", "Good Excuse", "Treat Yo Mama", "Funky Tonight" (S 17:25)
- James Mathison (presenter) (S 18:10)
- Wolfmother – "Dimension", "Apple Tree", "White Unicorn", "Woman", "Pleased to Meet You" "Joker and the Thief" (S 18:15)
- Michael Chugg (presenter) (S 19:00)
- Jack Johnson – "Times Like These", "Horizon Has Been Defeated", "Good People", "Gone", "Traffic in the Sky", "Staple it Together"/"Whole Lotta Love", "Spring Wind/Fall Line", "Mudfootball (for Moe Lerner)", "Inaudible Melodies" (S 19:05)
- Bruce McAvaney (presenter) (S 19:50)
- Crowded House – "Locked Out", "World Where You Live", "Silent House", "Fall at Your Feet", "Four Seasons In One Day", "Don't Stop Now", "Distant Sun", "Don't Dream It's Over", "Something So Strong", "Weather with You" (with most of the other artists in attendance), "Better Be Home Soon" (For the last performance, the majority of the stage lights failed) (S 19:55)

== Environmental Measures ==
The event was carbon neutral with unavoidable gas emissions being offset with programs that reduce emissions elsewhere.

Tickets for the show were printed on recycled paper and included free public transport from anywhere in NSW on the day of the event.

== Problems ==
The Sydney Morning Herald reported the following:

Scores were seen leaving within the first two hours of the nine-hour festival, fed up with the lack of basic services, cutting their losses on a $99 ticket. Gate attendants were heard telling the human tide that they should complain to the promoter. It was "unAustralian", one spectator protested. "This is what happens when you let hippies organise a big event," another said...Police charged 19 people with drug offences.

== Power Outage ==
During the Crowded House performance the stage lights went out during "Something So Strong". The band played on, however, as the PA system was still operational. The outage was unexpected by Crowded House and unplanned by organisers.

== Coverage ==
=== Television ===
Live coverage of the Sydney event was broadcast on Channel V and MAX. In Canada, it was shown uninterrupted on MuchMoreMusic.

=== Online ===
Live streaming of the concert was broadcast on MSN and ninemsn.
