= Inshalla (album) =

Studio album by Eskimo Joe
- Released: 29 May 2009
- Recorded: October – November 2008
- Studios: Studios 301 (Byron Bay, Australia)
- Genre: Alternative rock
- Label: Warner
- Producer: Gil Norton

Eskimo Joe chronology
Beating like a Drum (2007)	Inshalla (2009)	Ghosts of the Past (2011)

Singles from Inshalla
- 1. "Foreign Land" Released: 3 April 2009; 2. "Losing Friends Over Love" Released: 26 June 2009; 3. "Don't Let Me Down" Released: September 2009

Professional ratings
Review scores
Source	Rating
The Herald Sun	3.5/5 stars
Rolling Stone	4/5 stars

Inshalla is the fourth studio album by Australian rock band, Eskimo Joe, released on 29 May 2009. The first single from the album is "Foreign Land", which was released in April 2009. A special limited edition 2CD release of the album contains live versions of songs from their previous album, Black Fingernails, Red Wine, and is only on sale in the band's home state of Western Australia. The album debuted at number one on the Australian ARIA Charts.

== Background ==
In an interview with Australian radio station Triple J, lead singer Kav Temperley explained his choice of an Arabic word for the album title.

It basically translates to 'what will be will be' but the literal translation is 'God willing'. It's a really beautiful Arabic word and it basically means a resignation to fate, like you're kind of letting the chips lie where they will. The people in the Arabic world use it all the time, they use it for like, 'who knows?'

— Kav Temperley

Inshalla explores a very different sound for Eskimo Joe. The band have mentioned that they were at a stage where they wanted to do something different musically and also in their personal lives.

I had a real moment when in Egypt with our manager and I kind of had to make a decision whether I wanted to jump further off the precipice of being a rock star or just be Kav again and go back home to Fremantle. And that's basically what I chose and that's where the stories from the album came from. The album starts off at that moment and goes in to a more – I hate to say it – hopeful place.

— Kavyen Temperley

In an interview Joel Quartermain explains

With the last record we wanted to write an album that was very distilled and every song sounded like it came from that record, whereas this time we just went in a bunch of different directions. It's all over the shop. We didn't try to think about it too much as we did last time. It is much less sculptured. It is the heaviest thing we've done, but the album also has the most gentle music we've made as well.

— Joel Quartermain

== Production ==
The band has been in the studio since 2008 working on new material. Two early demos during the recording sessions were leaked onto YouTube. The band later confirmed that they were only released on the site for a maximum of 24 hours. The songs were titled "Childhood Behaviour" and "Losing My Mind". During a live performance the title of the album was announced and so was the first single.

The band decided not to produce the album themselves, as they had for previous albums, instead engaging Gil Norton (The Pixies, Foo Fighters, Gomez). A producer that the band had always dreamed of one day working with.

Gil's sensibilities are pop and one of trimming all the fat and leaving what's essential. It was a nice dream-come-true moment thing after so long.

— Joel Quartermain

The album was recorded at Studio 301 in Byron Bay, New South Wales.

"Foreign Land" was created from an eight-second sample of traditional Turkish music that the band looped and added drum parts to. The song was written as a tribute to Australian actor Heath Ledger, who died in January 2008. The album's middle eastern flavour also extends to the title track, "Inshalla", which was written by Temperley while he was travelling around Egypt with the band's manager.

Inshalla is the first Eskimo Joe album to be released in Europe, as a result of the band's signing with the European arm of Warner Music Group. Whilst the album will also be released in the United States the band intends to concentrate on Europe, after having recently toured there.

== Promotion ==
During the week of the album release, Eskimo Joe played a limited-access 30-minute set for only 200 fans in Sydney's George Street Apple Store as part of the iTunes Live from Sydney series. The performance will be available to purchase as a downloadable EP through the iTunes Store.

The band have played a special preview concert coinciding with the album launch on 29 May for fans from their home town in Western Australia in the Astor Theatre, tickets were given away by Nova 93.7 as a competition.

The band has planned a national tour to promote the album, for the second half of 2009.

At the ARIA Music Awards of 2009, the album was nominated for the ARIA Award for Album of the Year.

== Track listing ==
Inshalla
No.	Title	Writer(s)	Length
1.	"Foreign Land" (contains elements from "Adiyaman (a province of South-Eastern part of Turkey)" performed by the Anadolu University Folk Dance Ensemble (A university student club in Turkish province of Eskisehir))	Eskimo Joe, Steve Parkin	4:31
2.	"Inshalla"	Eskimo Joe	3:33
3.	"Losing Friends Over Love"	Eskimo Joe, Steve Parkin	3:38
4.	"The Sound of Your Heart"	Eskimo Joe, Steve Parkin	3:25
5.	"Childhood Behaviour"	Eskimo Joe	3:35
6.	"Don't Let Me Down"	Eskimo Joe, Steve Parkin	3:39
7.	"Falling for You" (Intro)	Eskimo Joe	0:42
8.	"Falling for You"	Eskimo Joe, Steve Parkin	3:05
9.	"Losing My Mind"	Eskimo Joe	3:17
10.	"Your Eyes"	Eskimo Joe	3:15
11.	"Please Elise"	Eskimo Joe, Justin Burford	3:09
12.	"Morning Light"	Eskimo Joe	3:22
13.	"Honeymoon" (iTunes bonus track)	Eskimo Joe	4:43
14.	"Thunderclap" (iTunes pre-order bonus track)	Eskimo Joe	3:33

Inshalla W.A. Limited Edition Bonus Disc – Live from the Enmore Theatre
No.	Title	Length
1.	"Comfort You"	3:23
2.	"New York"	4:02
3.	"Black Fingernails Red Wine"	4:20
4.	"London Bombs"	3:56
5.	"From the Sea"	3:48
6.	"How Does It Feel"	4:13

Inshalla Limited Edition 12" Vinyl Side one
No.	Title	Writer(s)	Length
1.	"Foreign Land" (contains elements from "Adiyaman (a province of South-Eastern part of Turkey)" performed by the Anadolu University Folk Dance Ensemble (A university student club in Turkish province of Eskisehir))	Eskimo Joe, Steve Parkin	4:31
2.	"Inshalla"	Eskimo Joe	3:33
3.	"Losing Friends Over Love"	Eskimo Joe, Steve Parkin	3:38
4.	"The Sound of Your Heart"	Eskimo Joe, Steve Parkin	3:25
5.	"Childhood Behaviour"	Eskimo Joe	3:35

Inshalla Limited Edition 12" Vinyl Side two
No.	Title	Writer(s)	Length
6.	"Don't Let Me Down"	Eskimo Joe, Steve Parkin	3:39
7.	"Falling for You" (Intro)	Eskimo Joe	0:42
8.	"Falling for You"	Eskimo Joe, Steve Parkin	3:05
9.	"Losing My Mind"	Eskimo Joe	3:17
10.	"Your Eyes"	Eskimo Joe	3:15
11.	"Please Elise"	Eskimo Joe, Justin Burford	3:09
12.	"Morning Light"	Eskimo Joe	3:22

== Personnel ==
=== Eskimo Joe ===
Personnel per booklet.

- Kav – vocals, bass, keyboards
- Stu MacLeod – guitar, vocals
- Joel Quartermain – guitar, drums, vocals

=== Additional musicians ===
- Anne-Louise Comerford – strings ("Childhood Behaviour")
- Phillip Hartl – strings ("Childhood Behaviour")
- Andrew Hines – strings ("Childhood Behaviour")
- Hugh Jennings – accordion ("Please Elise")
- Lee Jones – guitar ("Please Elise")
- Andy Lawson – vocals ("Don't Let Me Down")
- Paul Millard – horns ("Losing My Mind")
- Steve Parkin – vocals ("Losing Friends Over Love", "Don't Let Me Down", "Losing My Mind", "Please Elise")
- Shaun Luke Sibbes – percussion ("Losing My Mind"), whistling ("Morning Light")
- Mark Underwood – horns ("Losing My Mind")
- Claire White – whistling ("Morning Light")

=== Production ===
- Dave Bascombe – mixer
- Andy Lawson – post-production engineer
- Bob Ludwig – mastering
- Jimi Maroudas – engineer
- Mathematics – design
- Adrian Mesko – photography
- Gil Norton – producer, mixer
- Pablo Verduga – assistant engineer

== Charts ==
=== Weekly charts ===
Chart (2009)	Peak position
Australian Albums (ARIA)	1

=== Year-end charts ===
Chart (2009)	Rank
Australian Albums Chart	45

== Certifications ==
Region	Certification	Certified units/sales
Australia (ARIA)	Gold	35,000^{^}
^{^} Shipments figures based on certification alone.

== Release history ==
Region	Date	Label	Format	Catalogue
Australia	29 May 2009	Warner	CD, digital download	5186534242
Australia	29 May 2009	Warner	CD	5186540285
Canada	29 May 2009	Rykodisc	CD	10987
United States	14 July 2009	Rykodisc	CD	10987
Australia	11 December 2009	Warner	12" Vinyl	5186534247
Australia	2018	Warner Music Australasia	LP	5419701489
Australia	2018	Warner Music Australasia	CD (Anniversary Edition)	5419702418

== See also ==
- List of number-one albums of 2009 (Australia)
