= Triple J's Hottest 100 of 2006 =

Australian song chart in 2006

2006 Triple J Hottest 100

Countdown details
- Date of countdown: 26 January 2007

Countdown highlights
- Winning song: Augie March "One Crowded Hour"
- Most entries: Hilltop Hoods (5 tracks)

Chronology
← Previous; 2005	Next → 2007

The 2006 Triple J Hottest 100 was announced on 26 January 2007. It is the fourteenth such countdown of the most popular songs of the year, as voted by listeners of the Australian radio station Triple J.

Voting began on 1 January 2007, and closed on 21 January 2007. 671,024 votes were counted in this year's poll.

The broadcast began at 10 am, and at midday, crossed to Hyde Park in Sydney for a live broadcast of the countdown, beginning at #75. The top 10 was announced from 6 pm, by breakfast team Myf Warhurst, Jay and the Doctor, when announcing the winning song, presenters labelled Augie March's victory as a huge upset given that "Black Fingernails, Red Wine" by Eskimo Joe and "Crazy" by Gnarls Barkley were the favourites to win the countdown.

The broadcast was also the first time the Hottest 100 had a live video webcast through the Triple J Website, showing film clips of each video and live footage from Hyde Park.

== Full list ==
Note: Australian artists

#	Song	Artist	Country of origin
1	One Crowded Hour	Augie March	Australia
2	Black Fingernails, Red Wine	Eskimo Joe	Australia
3	The Hard Road	Hilltop Hoods	Australia
4	When You Were Young	The Killers	United States
5	I Don't Feel Like Dancin'	Scissor Sisters	United States
6	Crazy	Gnarls Barkley	United States
7	Chasing Cars	Snow Patrol	United Kingdom
8	Hearts a Mess	Gotye	Australia
9	Starlight	Muse	United Kingdom
10	19-20-20	The Grates	Australia
11	Come On Come On	Little Birdy	Australia
12	Funky Tonight	John Butler Trio	Australia
13	Welcome to the Black Parade	My Chemical Romance	United States
14	Here It Goes Again	OK Go	United States
15	Smile	Lily Allen	United Kingdom
16	Young Folks	Peter Bjorn & John featuring Victoria Bergsman	Sweden
17	Science Is Golden	The Grates	Australia
18	Supermassive Black Hole	Muse	United Kingdom
19	Kick, Push	Lupe Fiasco	United States
20	Fidelity	Regina Spektor	United States
21	Forever Young	Youth Group	Australia
22	Vicarious	Tool	United States
23	Clown Prince	Hilltop Hoods	Australia
24	Gold Lion	Yeah Yeah Yeahs	United States
25	Meds	Placebo featuring Alison Mosshart	United Kingdom/United States
26	Ta Douleur	Camille	France
27	You Only Live Once	The Strokes	United States
28	Steady, As She Goes	The Saboteurs	United States
29	The Pot	Tool	United States
30	When the Sun Goes Down	Arctic Monkeys	United Kingdom
31	Bones	The Killers	United States
32	Gone	The Butterfly Effect	Australia
33	Call Me Anytime	The Cops	Australia
34	Dani California	Red Hot Chili Peppers	United States
35	LDN	Lily Allen	United Kingdom
36	Nowhere Without You	Bob Evans	Australia
37	Don't You Think It's Time?	Bob Evans	Australia
38	Memories and Dust	Josh Pyke	Australia
39	A Slow Descent	The Butterfly Effect	Australia
40	Take Me Back to Your House	Basement Jaxx	United Kingdom
41	What a Great Night	Hilltop Hoods	Australia
42	Inside Outside	The Grates	Australia
43	Paper Aeroplane	Angus & Julia Stone	Australia
44	Love Me or Hate Me	Lady Sovereign	United Kingdom
45	Roquefort	Karnivool featuring Empire Horns	Australia
46	Miss Murder	AFI	United States
47	The Truth About Cats and Dogs (Is That They Die)	Pony Up!	Canada
48	On the Radio	Regina Spektor	United States
49	Fake Tales of San Francisco	Arctic Monkeys	United Kingdom
50	Heart in a Cage	The Strokes	United States
51	Cigarettes and Suitcases	Something for Kate	Australia
52	Unpredictable	The Herd	Australia
53	Wake Up	The Living End	Australia
54	I Want You So Hard (Boy's Bad News)	Eagles of Death Metal	United States
55	Woman (MSTRKRFT Remix)	Wolfmother	Australia/Canada
56	Stopping All Stations	Hilltop Hoods	Australia
57	Private Education	Josh Pyke	Australia
58	Always on This Line	Sarah Blasko	Australia
59	Song to Say Goodbye	Placebo	United Kingdom
60	Over and Over	Hot Chip	United Kingdom
61	Everlong (Live)	Foo Fighters	United States
62	We Are Your Friends	Justice vs. Simian	France/United Kingdom
63	Wolf Like Me	TV on the Radio	United States
64	Apple of the Eye (Lay Me Down)	Something with Numbers	Australia
65	The Prayer	Bloc Party	United Kingdom
66	Phenomena	Yeah Yeah Yeahs	United States
67	Love Like Winter	AFI	United States
68	Happiness Is a Chemical	Darren Hanlon	Australia
69	Nausea	Beck	United States
70	Such Great Heights (Like a Version)	Ben Folds	United States
71	Lies Are Much More Fun	The Grates	Australia
72	Put Your Money Where Your Mouth Is	Jet	Australia
73	King Without a Crown	Matisyahu	United States
74	Hands Open	Snow Patrol	United Kingdom
75	Sundress	Ben Kweller	United States
76	Rip It Up	Jet	Australia
77	Recapturing the Vibe	Hilltop Hoods	Australia
78	Infra-Red	Placebo	United Kingdom
79	{Explain}	Sarah Blasko	Australia
80	Love Train	Wolfmother	Australia
81	Gone Daddy Gone	Gnarls Barkley	United States
82	Painkiller	Freestylers featuring Pendulum and SirReal	United Kingdom/Australia/Canada
83	Get Up Outta the Dirt	Butterfingers	Australia
84	Black Swan	Thom Yorke	United Kingdom
85	Love Like Semtex	Infadels	United Kingdom
86	Touch the Sky	Kanye West featuring Lupe Fiasco	United States
87	Better Way	Ben Harper	United States
88	Tarantula	Pendulum and Fresh featuring $pyda and Tenor Fly	Australia/United Kingdom
89	Mardy Bum	Arctic Monkeys	United Kingdom
90	Work It Out	Jurassic 5 featuring Dave Matthews Band	United States
91	The Only Difference Between Martyrdom and Suicide Is Press Coverage	Panic! at the Disco	United States
92	Alfie	Lily Allen	United Kingdom
93	Everything's Just Wonderful	Lily Allen	United Kingdom
94	Learnalilgivinanlovin	Gotye	Australia
95	New York	Eskimo Joe	Australia
96	Slide in Next to Me	Red Riders	Australia
97	World Wide Suicide	Pearl Jam	United States
98	Standing in the Way of Control	Gossip	United States
99	Original Fire	Audioslave	United States
100	Come and Check Your Head	Blue King Brown	Australia

== Statistics ==
=== Artists with multiple entries ===
#	Artist	Entries
5	Hilltop Hoods	3, 23, 41, 56, 77
4	The Grates	10, 17, 42, 71
4	Lily Allen	15, 35, 92, 93
3	Placebo	25, 59, 78
3	Arctic Monkeys	30, 49, 89
2	Eskimo Joe	2, 95
2	The Killers	4, 31
2	Gnarls Barkley	6, 81
2	Snow Patrol	7, 74
2	Gotye	8, 94
2	Muse	9, 18
2	Lupe Fiasco (Note: Once solo (19), once with Kanye West (86))	19, 86
2	Regina Spektor	20, 48
2	Tool	22, 29
2	Yeah Yeah Yeahs	24, 66
2	The Strokes	27, 50
2	The Butterfly Effect	32, 39
2	Bob Evans	36, 37
2	Josh Pyke	38, 57
2	AFI	46, 67
2	Wolfmother	55, 80
2	Sarah Blasko	58, 79
2	Jet	72, 76
2	Pendulum (Note: Once as a lead artist (88), once with Freestylers (82))	82, 88

=== Countries represented ===
Country	Entries
Australia	43
United States	35
United Kingdom	22
France	2
Canada	3
Sweden	1

=== Records ===
- The Living End, with their song Wake Up at No. 53, made it into the countdown for the tenth year in a row, having featured in every annual countdown since 1997.
- Augie March are the first winning artist since Spiderbait in 1996 to only feature once in the countdown.
- This was the first countdown since 1999 to feature an all-Australian top 3.
- "The Only Difference Between Martyrdom and Suicide Is Press Coverage" by Panic! at the Disco is the longest song title to feature in a Hottest 100 countdown.

== Top 10 Albums of 2006 ==
Bold indicates winner of the Hottest 100 in 2006 and 2007. Hilltop Hoods won the J Award for The Hard Road.

#	Artist	Album	Country of origin	Tracks in the Hottest 100
1	Gotye	Like Drawing Blood	Australia	8, 94
2	My Chemical Romance	The Black Parade	United States	13 (44 in 2007)
3	Tool	10,000 Days	United States	22, 29
4	**Muse**	**Black Holes & Revelations**	**United Kingdom**	**9, 18 (1, 58 in 2007)**
5	The Grates	Gravity Won't Get You High	Australia	10, 17, 42, 71
6	Arctic Monkeys	Whatever People Say I Am, That's What I'm Not	United Kingdom	30, 49, 89 (50 in 2005)
7	Little Birdy	Hollywood	Australia	11
8	**Augie March**	**Moo, You Bloody Choir**	**Australia**	**1**
9	Yeah Yeah Yeahs	Show Your Bones	United States	24, 66
10	Hilltop Hoods	The Hard Road	Australia	3, 23, 41, 56, 77

== CD Release ==
Disc 1
No.	Title	Artist(s)	Length
1.	"One Crowded Hour" (#1)	Augie March	4:13
2.	"Black Fingernails, Red Wine" (#2)	Eskimo Joe	4:09
3.	"The Hard Road" (#3)	Hilltop Hoods	4:05
4.	"When You Were Young" (#4)	The Killers	3:38
5.	"19-20-20" (#10)	The Grates	2:04
6.	"Crazy" (#6)	Gnarls Barkley	2:58
7.	"Supermassive Black Hole" (#18)	Muse	3:29
8.	"I Don't Feel Like Dancin'" (#5)	Scissor Sisters	4:07
9.	"Hearts a Mess" (#8)	Gotye	4:38
10.	"Funky Tonight" (#12)	John Butler Trio	3:39
11.	"Smile" (#15)	Lily Allen	3:14
12.	"Here It Goes Again" (#14)	OK GO	2:59
13.	"Nausea" (#69)	Beck	2:54
14.	"Kick Push" (#19)	Lupe Fiasco	3:50
15.	"Come On Come On" (#11)	Little Birdy	3:52
16.	"Call Me Anytime" (#33)	The Cops	3:48
17.	"Gone" (#32)	The Butterfly Effect	3:58
18.	"Over & Over" (#60)	Hot Chip	3:49
19.	"{Explain}" (#79)	Sarah Blasko	4:02
20.	"Chasing Cars (Live)" (#7)	Snow Patrol	4:27

Disc 2
No.	Title	Artist(s)	Length
1.	"We Are Your Friends" (#62)	Justice vs. Simian	2:40
2.	"Miss Murder" (#46)	AFI	3:24
3.	"Love Train" (#80)	Wolfmother	3:00
4.	"Gold Lion" (#24)	Yeah Yeah Yeahs	3:05
5.	"Young Folks" (#16)	Peter Bjorn & John featuring Victoria Bergsman	4:37
6.	"Nowhere Without You" (#36)	Bob Evans	4:17
7.	"Ta Douleur" (#26)	Camille	3:06
8.	"Take Me Back to Your House" (#40)	Basement Jaxx	3:42
9.	"Roquefort" (#45)	Karnivool	4:37
10.	"Wolf Like Me" (#63)	TV on the Radio	4:38
11.	"Apple of the Eye" (#64)	Something With Numbers	3:27
12.	"Fidelity" (#20)	Regina Spektor	3:46
13.	"Paper Aeroplane" (#43)	Angus & Julia Stone	3:41
14.	"Painkiller" (#82)	Freestylers featuring Pendulum	3:45
15.	"I Want You So Hard (Boy's Bad News)" (#54)	Eagles Of Death Metal	2:22
16.	"Standing In The Way Of Control" (#98)	The Gossip	4:16
17.	"Come & Check Your Head" (#100)	Blue King Brown	3:58
18.	"Unpredictable" (#52)	The Herd	3:49
19.	"Meds" (#25)	Placebo featuring Alison Mosshart	2:52
20.	"Memories & Dust" (#38)	Josh Pyke	3:03
21.	"Love Me Or Hate Me" (#44)	Lady Sovereign	3:32

=== DVD Release ===
1. Augie March - "One Crowded Hour" (#1)
2. Eskimo Joe - "Black Fingernails, Red Wine" (#2)
3. Hilltop Hoods - "The Hard Road" (#3)
4. The Killers - "When You Were Young" (#4)
5. The Grates - "19-20-20" (#10)
6. Gnarls Barkley - "Crazy" (#6)
7. Gotye - "Hearts a Mess" (#8)
8. Muse - "Supermassive Black Hole" (#18)
9. Lily Allen - "Smile" (#15)
10. Little Birdy - "Come On Come On" (#11)
11. Scissor Sisters - "I Don't Feel Like Dancin'" (#5)
12. OK Go - "Here It Goes Again" (#14)
13. The Butterfly Effect - "Gone" (#32)
14. Bob Evans - "Don't You Think It's Time?" (#37)
15. Camille - "Ta Douleur" (#26)
16. Justice vs. Simian - "We Are Your Friends" (#62)
17. Placebo feat. Alison Mosshart - "Meds" (#25)
18. The Living End - "Wake Up" (#53)
19. Yeah Yeah Yeahs - "Gold Lion" (#24)
20. Something With Numbers - "Apple of the Eye (Lay Me Down)" (#64)
21. Something for Kate - "Cigarettes and Suitcases" (#51)
22. Hot Chip - "Over and Over" (#60)
23. Angus & Julia Stone - "Paper Aeroplane" (#43)
24. Peter Bjorn and John feat. Victoria Bergsman- "Young Folks" (#16)
25. Freestylers feat. Pendulum & SirReal - "Painkiller" (#82)
26. Infadels - "Love Like Semtex" (#85)
27. Beck - "Nausea" (#69)
28. Josh Pyke - "Memories & Dust" (#38)
29. Lady Sovereign - "Love Me or Hate Me" (#44)
30. Wolfmother - "Love Train" (#80)
31. Sarah Blasko - "{Explain}" (#79)
32. Lupe Fiasco - "Kick, Push" (#19)
33. The Cops - "Call Me Anytime" (#33)
34. Regina Spektor - "Fidelity" (#20)
35. Basement Jaxx feat. Martina Sorbara - "Take Me Back to Your House" (#40)
36. Darren Hanlon - "Happiness Is a Chemical" (#68)
37. The John Butler Trio - "Funky Tonight" (#12)
38. Butterfingers - "Get Up Outta the Dirt" (#83)
39. Red Riders - "Slide In Next To Me" (#96)
40. Jet - "Rip It Up" (#76)
41. Ben Harper - "Better Way" (#87)
42. Gossip - "Standing In The Way Of Control" (#98)
