= Beating like a Drum =

EP by Eskimo Joe
- Released: 4 August 2007
- Recorded: 2007
- Genre: Rock
- Label: Mushroom, Warner

Eskimo Joe chronology
Black Fingernails, Red Wine (2006)	Beating like a Drum (2007)	Inshalla (2009)

Beating like a Drum is the third extended play by Australian band, Eskimo Joe, released on 4 August 2007. Originally only a limited number were available at shows on their Beating like a Drum national tour.

The EP features six original Eskimo Joe tracks remixed by Dexter, Sneaky Sound System, Teenager, P-Money, and Bumblebeez, and a mash-up of "Black Fingernails, Red Wine" and "From the Sea" by Nick Launay.

== Track listing ==
All tracks are written by Eskimo Joe

Beating like a Drum
No.	Title	Length
1.	"Black Nails from the Red Sea" (Nixmix; Remixed by Nick Launay)	6:33
2.	"Beating like a Drum" (Dexter's Raskol Mix; Remixed by G. Mcquilten, A. Ingram, D. Faby & V. Juste-Constant)	5:02
3.	"London Bombs" (Sneaky Sound System Remix; Additional production by Black Angus & Peter Dolso)	5:01
4.	"Comfort You" (P-Money Mix; produced, mixed & arranged by P- Money)	3:57
5.	"New York" (Teenager South of Huston Mix; Mixed by Teenager)	4:52
6.	"Sarah" (The Bumblebeez Rmx; Remixed by the Bumblebeez Produced by Invisibl)	3:37

== Release history ==
Region	Date	Label	Format	Catalogue
Australia	4 August 2007	Mushroom, Warner	CD	5144213082
