= Don't Let Me Down (Eskimo Joe song) =

Single by Eskimo Joe

from the album Inshalla
- Released: 11 September 2009
- Recorded: 2008
- Genre: Alternative rock
- Length: 3:38
- Label: Warner
- Songwriters: Eskimo Joe (Kavyen Temperley, Stuart MacLeod & Joel Quartermain) & Steve Parkin
- Producer: Gil Norton

Eskimo Joe singles chronology
"Losing Friends Over Love" (2009)	"Don't Let Me Down" (2009)	"When We Were Kids" (2011)

"Don't Let Me Down" is a song by Australian band, Eskimo Joe. It was released digitally in September 2009 as the third and final single from their fourth studio album Inshalla. The song peaked at number 50 on the ARIA charts.

Eskimo Joe performed the song on the first reunion show of the Hey Hey It's Saturday on 30 September 2009.

== Music video ==
A music video directed by Damien Escott and Stephen Lance of Head Pictures was released.

== Track listing ==
All tracks are written by Eskimo Joe

iTunes single
No.	Title	Length
1.	"Don't Let Me Down"	3:38
2.	"Inshalla" (acoustic version)	3:08

== Charts ==
Chart (2009)	Peak position
Australia (ARIA)	50

== Release history ==
Region	Date	Label	Format	Catalogue
Australia	11 September 2009	Warner	Digital download	-
