= Clown Prince =

Single by Hilltop Hoods

from the album The Hard Road
- Released: 20 January 2006
- Recorded: X Bred Production Studios
- Genre: Australian hip hop
- Length: 3:54
- Label: Obese Records
- Songwriters: Don Argott, Barry Francis, Matthew Lambert, Daniel Smith
- Producer: DJ Debris

Hilltop Hoods singles chronology
"The Nosebleed Section" (2003)	"Clown Prince" (2006)	"The Hard Road" (2006)

"Clown Prince" is a song by Australian hip-hop band, the Hilltop Hoods. It was released in January 2006 as the lead single from their fourth studio album, The Hard Road.

"Clown Price" peaked at #30 in the ARIA charts, becoming the first Hilltop Hoods song to appear on the ARIA Singles Chart.

The song also charted at #23 on the Triple J Hottest 100, 2006 list.

== Sampling ==
The main bassline used for "Clown Prince" is sampled from "Laying Pipe" by Pornosonic. It was previously used in a 70's pornographic film, featuring Ron Jeremy.

You'd have to ask DJ Debris how that happened. I think it did come from his personal collection. I'm really putting him in it, aren't I? The film was called Laying Pipe; it's about a plumber. Some kind of theme movie, I'm told. I haven't seen it, but I've heard the audio. It's pretty funny.

— Daniel Smith (Pressure)

It also contains vocal samples of The Notorious B.I.G.'s "Things Done Changed" and A Tribe Called Quest's "Excursions". A remix of the song featuring the Adelaide Symphony Orchestra was also released on the Hilltop Hoods' 2007 remix album The Hard Road: Restrung.

== Music video ==
The music video is animated by John Engelhardt, who is also known for designing Armageddon, the Hoods' mascot who appears on all their covers, with Suffa.

== CD single track listing ==
All tracks are written by Matthew Lambert (Suffa), Daniel Smith (Pressure), Barry Francis (DJ Debris) and Don Argott

Clown Prince
No.	Title	Length
1.	"Clown Prince"	3:54
2.	"Clown Prince" (Radio Edit)	3:53
3.	"Clown Prince" (Instrumental)	3:52
4.	"Clown Prince" (Trials Remix) (vocal)	3:36
5.	"Clown Prince" (Trials Remix) (radio edit)	3:32
6.	"Clown Prince" (Trials Remix) (instrumental)	3:33

== Personnel ==
- Artwork (Graphic Design) - Benjamin Funnell
- Artwork (Illustration) - John Engelhardt
- Mastered - Neville Clark

== Charts ==
=== Weekly chart ===
Chart (2006)	Peak position
Australia (ARIA)	30

=== Year-end chart ===
Chart (2006)	Rank
Australian Artists (ARIA)	46

== Certifications ==
Certifications for "Clown Prince"
Region	Certification	Certified units/sales
Australia (ARIA)	Gold	35,000^{‡}
^{‡} Sales+streaming figures based on certification alone.

== Release history ==
Region	Date	Label	Format	Catalogue
Australia	20 January 2006	Obese	CD	OBR 041
Australia	20 January 2006	Obese	12" vinyl	OBR 041-2
