= Alcotomic =

Australian power pop band

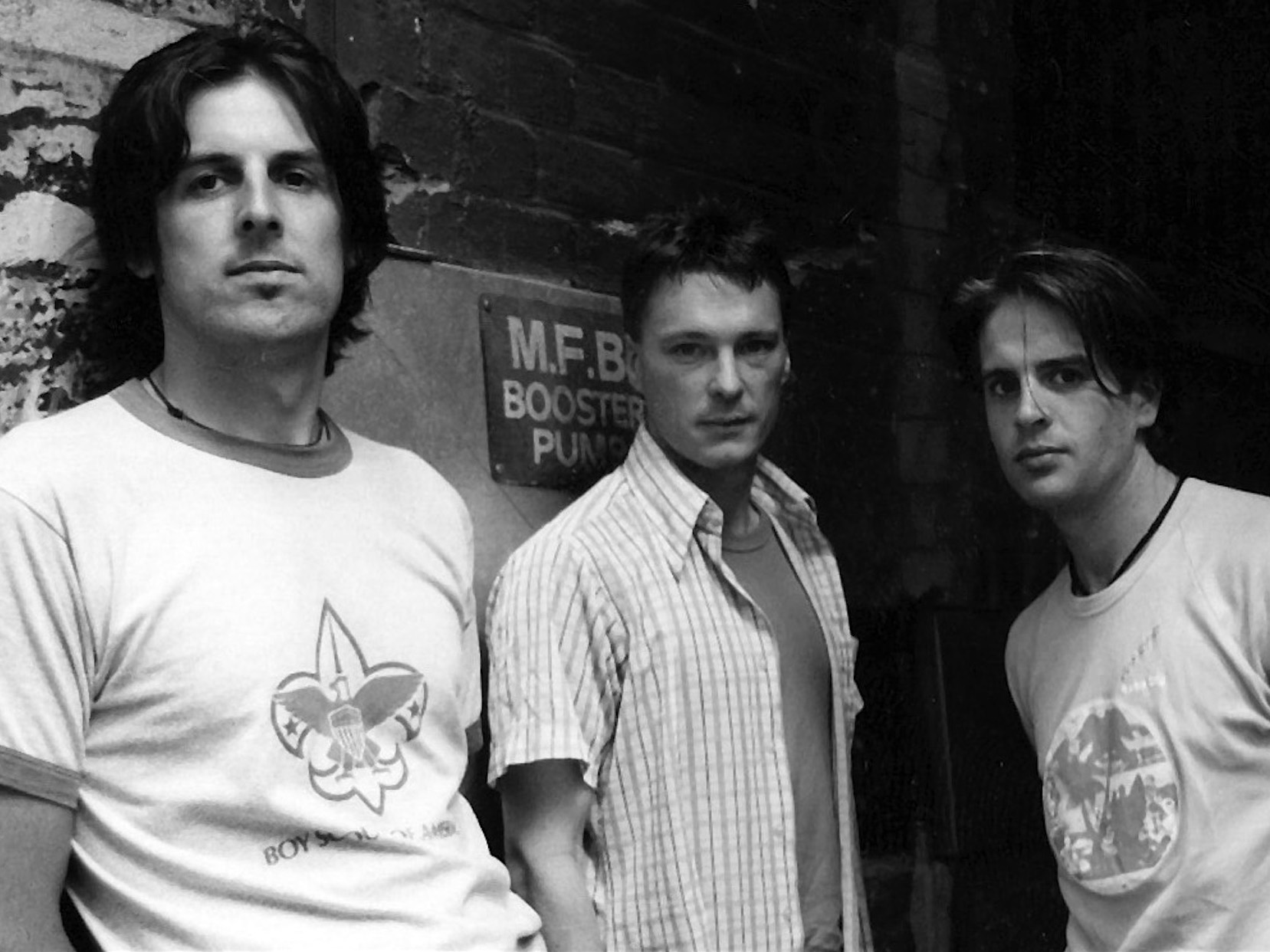
- Alcotomic in 1997; left to right, John Freeman Baxter, Denny Brereton, Andy Strachan

Background information
- Origin: Melbourne, Victoria, Australia
- Genres: Power pop, alternative rock
- Years active: 1996–2001
- Labels: Magneto, Not Lame Recordings, MGM Distribution, Popboomerang
- Spinoffs: Holocene, Magneto, Moler, Pollyanna (band), The Living End, Prettymess
- Past members: John Freeman Baxter; Paul Inglis; Andy Strachan; Denny Brereton; Stephen Boyle
- Website: alcotomic.com

Alcotomic were an Australian power pop band formed in Melbourne, Victoria, February 1996. Initially, the band was called Dozer and the first recording session commenced at the original Birdland Recording Studios in High Street Prahran, Melbourne with record producer Lindsay Gravina. This line up consisted of John Freeman Baxter (Holocene) on vocals and guitar, Denny Brereton (Porcelain Jane) on bass and Stephen Boyle (Moler) on drums.

== History ==
Drummer Andy Strachan joined the band on drums in October 1996 and their five track self-titled debut EP often called "playing cards" due to the cover artwork, was released August 1997. Inpress Magazine's Natalie McPhee wrote: "This debut is filled with 6 examples of just how Alcotomic are able to manipulate the sounds of a three piece and make it all their own. I am in love with this voice, deep and husky; it sits beautifully within the arrangements that Alcotomic create."

In January 1998, the band traveled to Sydney, New South Wales, to work with producer and former Bell Jar keyboardist David "DP" Price at Velvet Sound Studios on what would become their follow-up three-track EP called 'Anything But You'. Released by MGM Distribution on July 4, the single went on to rotation on the national youth radio station Triple J, and the band made an appearance on the ABC TV's Recovery program. Shortly after, they signed with the US indie record label Not Lame Records and were selected as the most promising artist in 1998 to perform before industry professionals at the Pacific Circle Music Conference in Sydney, November 1998. Alex Wheaton from dB Magazine wrote: "Three songs only on this glorious little record from Melbourne's Alcotomic. Well crafted and airy harmonies of 'Invisible' are what set this song apart and the more stop/start percussive drive of 'Black Or White' utilizes a more complex arrangement."

In mid 1998, bassist Denny Brereton departed and Strachan's housemate Paul Inglis, also from Adelaide, joined the band on bass guitar. In early 1999, the band performed their 100th live show and was filmed by RMITV performing live at the Punters Club Hotel in Fitzroy on 2 December. The trio returned to Birdland Studio's to once again work with producer Lindsay Gravina in May 1999, cutting what would become their penultimate EP. Released July 2000 on Magneto/MGM, 'Where You Go' went on to receive glowing reviews and further radio support from Triple J and community radio stations. Sanity Magazine single pick of the week remarked: "Where You Go is an intoxicating blend of melody, cracking riffs, cute keyboard squelch, heavy bass, endearing husky vocals and a whole lotta fun".

By early 2001, band members began branching out into other projects, with Strachan joining Sydney band Pollyanna, and Baxter and Inglis working on a new band, Prettymess. Shortly thereafter, Strachan joined Australian chart topping band the Living End. The last live appearance of Alcotomic was on 1 August 2001, in Melbourne at the 9th Ward Bar, 298 Flinders Lane, Melbourne.

== Members ==
- John Freeman Baxter – vocals, guitar
- Paul Inglis – bass guitar, vocals
- Andy Strachan – drums, vocals

== Discography ==
=== Extended plays ===
- Alcotomic (1997) – Freebee Music
- Where You Go (2018) – Remastered with bonus tracks, Magneto/MGM Records

=== Singles ===
- "Anything But You" (1998) – Magneto/MGM Records, Not Lame Records, Popboomerang
- "Where You Go" (2000) – Magneto/MGM Records, Not Lame Records, Popboomerang
