= Tabloid Magazine (song) =

Single by The Living End

from the album Modern Artillery
- Released: 2 February 2004
- Recorded: 2003
- Studio: Ocean Studios, Burbank, California
- Genre: Punk rock, punkabilly
- Length: 3:20
- Label: EMI/Capitol
- Songwriter(s): Chris Cheney
- Producer(s): Mark Trombino

The Living End singles chronology
"Who's Gonna Save Us?" (2003)	"Tabloid Magazine" (2004)	"What's on Your Radio" (2005)

"Tabloid Magazine" is a song by Australian punk rock band The Living End. It was released in February 2004, as the second single from their third album, Modern ARTillery. The song spent 4 weeks in the Australian ARIA Singles Charts and peaked at No. 57. It appeared at No 66 on Triple J's Hottest 100 poll for 2003.

It features a live version of the classic "All Torn Down", plus acoustic versions of "Who's Gonna Save Us?" and "What Would You Do?" and a previously unreleased track, "No Reaction".

On the title track frontman Chris Cheney writes, "I have a weak spot for these mags. I am fascinated at the social preoccupation with reading about other people’s lives. They lure you in and become difficult to put down. I think it has a new wave kinda edge".

The video was directed by Todd Sheldrick, and filmed in Sydney during the band's national Modern ARTillery tour in 2003.

== Track listing ==
No.	Title	Writer(s)	Length
1.	"Tabloid Magazine"	Chris Cheney	3:20
2.	"No Reaction" (demo)	Chris Cheney	3:17
3.	"All Torn Down" (live @ Livid 2003)	Chris Cheney, Travis Demsey	4:07
4.	"What Would You Do?" (acoustic)	Scott Owen	1:28
5.	"Who's Gonna Save Us?" (acoustic)	Chris Chenney	3:21

== Personnel ==
Band members

- Chris Cheney – vocals, guitar
- Andy Strachan – drums
- Scott Owen – double bass, backing vocals

Recording process

- Producer – Mark Trombino
- Engineer – Mark Tromino
  - Assistant engineer – Dean Nelson, Jason Cupp
- Mastering – Brian Gardner
- Mixing – Mark Trombino
- Studios – Ocean Studios, Burbank, California
  - Mixing studios – Extasy South, Hollywood, California

Artwork

- Art direction – Richard Goodheart
- Photography – Matthew Welch

== Charts ==
Chart performance for "Tabloid Magazine"
Chart (2004)	Peak position
Australia (ARIA)	57

== Release history ==
Release history and formats for "Tabloid Magazine"
Region	Date	Label	Format	Catalogue
Australia	February 2004	EMI/Capitol	CD	5480642
