= What's on Your Radio =

2005 single by the Living End

Single by the Living End

from the album State of Emergency
- B-side: "Reborn"; "Wrong Side of the Tracks"; "I Can't Give You What I Haven't Got" (live); "West End Riot" (live)
- Released: 21 November 2005
- Length: 2:59
- Label: Capitol
- Songwriters: Chris Cheney; Andy Strachan
- Producer: Nick Launay

The Living End singles chronology
"I Can't Give You What I Haven't Got" (2004)	"What's on Your Radio" (2005)	"Wake Up" (2006)

"What's on Your Radio" is a song by Australian rock band the Living End, released as the first single from their fourth studio album, State of Emergency (2006). The song was released on 21 November 2005 and reached number nine in Australia. "What's on Your Radio" was voted to number 49 in the Triple J Hottest 100 for 2005. In the United Kingdom, the single was released as a download and limited-edition red 7-inch single.

== Track listings ==
Australian CD single

1. "What's on Your Radio" – 3:07
2. "Reborn" – 3:49
3. "Wrong Side of the Tracks" – 2:53

Coke Live 'n' Local CD single

1. "What's on Your Radio"
2. "I Can't Give You What I Haven't Got" (live at Splendour)
3. "West End Riot" (live at Splendour)

UK 7-inch red vinyl

A. "What's on Your Radio"
B. "We Want More"

== Charts ==
Chart (2005)	Peak position
Australia (ARIA)	9
