= Tabloid =

Tabloid may refer to:

== Journalism and media ==
- Tabloid (newspaper format), a newspaper with compact page size
- Chinese tabloid, tabloid newspapers in China
- Tabloid journalism, a type of journalism deriving from the style used by newspapers in tabloid format, focusing on controversial and sensationalistic angles or subjects
- Tabloid talk show, a type of talk show that emphasizes controversial and sensationalistic topical subject matter

== Film and television ==
- Tabloid (film), a 2010 documentary by Errol Morris
- Tabloid (TV program), a Canadian current affairs television series (1953–1960)

== Other uses ==
- Sopwith Tabloid, a biplane aircraft
- Tabloid (paper size), a North American paper size
- Tioguanine, a chemotherapy drug branded as Tabloid
- Young tabloid, a mathematical term used in representation theory

== See also ==
- "The Tabloid", a 1994 episode of the television show Matlock
- Tabloid Magazine (disambiguation)
