= The Hard Road =

Studio album by Hilltop Hoods
- Released: 1 April 2006
- Recorded: 2003–2005
- Genre: Australian hip hop
- Length: 54:14
- Label: Obese
- Producer: Hilltop Hoods

Hilltop Hoods chronology
The Calling (2003)	The Hard Road (2006)	The Hard Road: Restrung (2007)

Singles from The Hard Road
- 1. "Clown Prince" Released: 20 January 2006; 2. "The Hard Road" Released: 3 August 2006; 3. "What a Great Night" Released: 2 December 2006; 4. "Recapturing the Vibe" Released: 2007

Reissue Cover
- 2009 reissue cover

Professional ratings
Review scores
Source	Rating
AllMusic	3/5 stars
Soul Dungeon	4.5/5 stars

The Hard Road is the fourth studio album by Australian hip-hop group Hilltop Hoods, released on 1 April 2006 via Obese Records. It debuted at No. 1 on the ARIA Albums Chart, becoming the first album by an Australian hip-hop act to reach achieve this milestone. On 8 April 2006, just one week after its release, the album was certified Gold by ARIA, signifying 35,000 units. By February 2007, it had achieved Platinum certification, with sales surpassing 70,000 units.

At the J Award of 2006, it won the Australian Album of the Year. announced on 1 December. It was also nominated for four awards at the ARIA Music Awards of 2006, winning Best Independent Release and Best Urban Release.Five of the album's songs placed on the annual Triple J Hottest 100 chart announced on 26 January 2007: "Recapturing the Vibe" (No. 77), "Stopping All Stations" (No. 56), "What a Great Night" (No. 41), "Clown Prince" (No. 23), and "The Hard Road" (No. 3).

== Background ==
The Hard Road's lead single, "Clown Prince", reached the top 30 on the related ARIA Singles Chart. This featured guest verses from New York rapper, Omni, and British MCs, Mystro and Braintax. Hilltop Hoods received the inaugural Australian Independent Record (AIR) Award for Independent Artist of the Year and Best Performing Independent Album for The Hard Road in 2006. The track, "The Blue Blooded", is a collaboration with Australian MCs: Funkoars, Hau Latukefu from Koolism, Mortar, Vents, Drapht, Muph & Plutonic, Pegz and Robby Balboa. On 27 April of the same year, Hilltop Hoods performed at the Bass in the Grass music festival in Darwin alongside fellow hip hop group, The Herd. That same day they issued a second single, the title track from the album. Its music video includes fellow members from the Certified Wise Crew – Cross Bred Mongrels, Terra Firma and Funkoars.

Following the success of The Hard Road Tour in early 2006, the Hilltop Hoods began their second national tour for the year, The Stopping All Stations Tour, which visited more regional areas of Australia as well as the capital cities. They were supported by Koolism and Mystro. Late that year, Hilltop Hoods released their third single from the album, "What a Great Night". The video shows the group at a club with camera shots panning up and down to reveal a new location. It used special effects and is one of the most expensive video clips for an Australian hip hop group, mirroring the group's rise in success and popularity. Also late in the year the band won the J Award for best album of the year from Triple J. They performed the Homebake Festival and Falls Festival before the end of the year. The Hard Road received the AIR Award for Best Independent Hip Hop/Urban Release in 2007.

== Track listing ==
No.	Title	Writer(s)	Length
0.	"Ya Feel Big?" (pregap track)		3:48
1.	"Recapturing the Vibe"	Daniel Smith; Matthew Lambert	3:26
2.	"Clown Prince"	Lambert; Smith	3:52
3.	"The Hard Road"	Lambert; Smith	4:06
4.	"Stopping All Stations"	Smith	3:52
5.	"Conversations from a Speakeasy" (featuring Omni)	Smith; Joshua McDonald; Lambert	3:28
6.	"What a Great Intro" (interlude)		0:24
7.	"What a Great Night"	Lambert	3:06
8.	"City of Light"	Lambert; Smith	3:40
9.	"Obese Lowlifes" (featuring Mystro and Braintax)	Kevin Dafarmo; Smith; Joe Christie; Lambert	2:24
10.	"Circuit Breaker"	Lambert; Smith	3:29
11.	"Breathe"	Smith	3:15
12.	"The Blue Blooded" (featuring The Blue Blooded Allstars)	Lambert; Roy Mortimer; Daniel Rankine; Adam Baker; Langomi-e-Hau Latukefu; Paul Ridge; Joseph Lardner; Dan Young; Tirren Staff; Rob Warren; Matthew Honson; Smith	4:47
13.	"Monsters Ball"	Lambert; Smith	4:19
14.	"An Audience with the Devil"	Lambert	4:06
15.	"The Captured Vibe" (featuring DJ Reflux)		2:12
Total length:			54:14

2009 reissue bonus track
No.	Title	Writer(s)	Length
16.	"I Can't Take It"	Lambert; Smith	3:57
Total length:			58:11

== Secret track and extra material ==
1. Video clip of the first single "Clown Prince" is available for viewing on the CD.
2. Untitled secret track ("Ya Feel Big?", which works only on some stereos) - to access this track, start on track 1, "Recapturing the Vibe", and scan backwards. The song is about Hilltop Hoods' rise to fame and the struggles they endured because of this rise.

== Song credits ==
Due to the MCs Suffa and Pressure performing different verses and choruses of varying songs, the sections done by DJ Debris and the large number of guest artists featured on the album, what follows is an extensive list of song credits.

1. "Recapturing the Vibe" - 3:26
  - Produced by Suffa
  - Vocals by Pressure, Suffa
  - Scratches by DJ Debris
2. "Clown Prince" - 3:52
  - Produced by Debris
  - Verse 1: Suffa
  - Verse 2: Pressure & ct
  - Verse 3: Suffa & Pressure
  - Scratches by DJ Debris
  - Contains samples of "Laying Pipe" by Pornosonic; "Excursions" by A Tribe Called Quest; "Things Done Changed" by Notorious B.I.G.
3. "The Hard Road" - 4:06
  - Produced by Suffa
  - Vocals by Suffa, Pressure
  - Verse 3: Suffa
  - Scratches by DJ Debris
  - Contains samples of "Out in the Woods" by Leon Russell
4. "Stopping All Stations" - 3:52
  - Produced by Suffa
  - Vocals by Pressure
  - Scratches by DJ Debris
  - Contains samples of "Ego Trippin' (Part II)" by De La Soul; "1-800 Suicide" by Gravediggaz
5. "Conversations from a Speakeasy" featuring Omni - 3:28
  - (M. Lambert/D. Smith/B. Francis/J. McDonald)
  - Produced by Suffa
  - Verse 1: Pressure
  - Verse 2: Omni
  - Verse 3: Suffa
  - Scratches by DJ Debris
  - Contains samples of "You Gots to Chill" by EPMD
6. "What a Great Intro" - 0:24
7. "What a Great Night DNR" - 3:06
  - Produced & performed by Suffa
  - Scratches by DJ Debris
  - Contains samples of "For Pete's Sake" by Pete Rock & C.L. Smooth
8. "City of Light" - 3:40
  - Produced by Suffa
  - Verse 1: Suffa
  - Verse 2: Pressure
  - Scratches by DJ Debris
  - Bass guitar by Chris Lambert
  - Electric guitar by Nick Lambert
9. "Obese Lowlifes" featuring Mystro and Braintax - 2:24
  - (M. Lambert/D. Smith/B. Francis/K. Dafarmo/J. Christie)
  - Produced by Suffa
  - Verse 1: Mystro
  - Verse 2: Pressure
  - Verse 3: Braintax
  - Verse 4: Suffa
  - Scratches by DJ Debris
  - Contains samples of "These Walls Don't Lie" by Promoe
10. "Circuit Breaker" 3:29
  - (M. Lambert/D. Smith/B. Francis/D. Rankine)
  - Produced by Trials
  - Verse 1: Suffa
  - Verse 2: Pressure
  - Scratches by DJ Debris
  - Contains samples of "Professor Booty" by Beastie Boys; "Buddy" by De La Soul
11. "Breathe" - 3:15
  - Produced by Suffa
  - Performed by Pressure
  - Scratches by DJ Debris
  - Bass Guitar by Chris Lambert
  - Trumpet by Phil Ingram
  - Contains samples of "Unbelievable" by Notorious B.I.G.
12. "The Blue Blooded" featuring Blue Blooded Allstars - 4:47
  - (M. Lambert/D. Smith/B. Francis/R. Mortimer/D. Rankine/A. Baker/L. Latukefu/P. Ridge/J. Laroner/D. Young/T. Staff/R. Warren/M. Honson)
  - Produced by Suffa
  - Introduction: Trials
  - Verse 1: Suffa
  - Verse 2: Mortar
  - Verse 3: Trials and Sesta
  - Verse 4: Hau
  - Verse 5: Drapht
  - Verse 6: Vents
  - Verse 7: Muphin and Pegz
  - Verse 8: Robby Balboa
  - Verse 9: Honz
  - Verse 10: Pressure
13. "Monsters Ball" - 4:19
  - (M. Lambert/D. Smith/B. Francis/A. Simmons)
  - Produced by Simplex
  - Verse 1: Suffa
  - Verse 2: Pressure
14. "An Audience with the Devil" - 4:06
  - (M. Lambert/D. Smith/B. Francis/D. Rankine)
  - Produced by Trials
  - Performed by Suffa
  - Contains samples from an episode of Millennium titled "Somehow, Satan Got Behind Me"
15. "The Captured Vibe" featuring DJ Reflux - 2:12
  - (M. Lambert/D. Smith/B. Francis/D. Yates)
  - Produced by Suffa
  - Scratches by DJ Reflux
16. "I Can't Take It" (deluxe edition Bonus Track)
  - (M. Lambert/D. Smith/B. Francis/D. Rankine)
  - Produced by Trials
  - Verse 1: Suffa
  - Verse 2: Pressure

== Charts ==
=== Weekly charts ===
Chart (2006–2012)	Peak position
Australian Albums (ARIA)	1

=== Year-end charts ===
Chart (2006)	Position
Australian Albums (ARIA)	54

== Certifications ==
Region	Certification	Certified units/sales
Australia (ARIA)	Platinum	70,000^{^}
^{^} Shipments figures based on certification alone.
