= Nothing Lasts Forever (The Living End song) =

Single by The Living End

from the album State of Emergency
- Released: 19 August 2006
- Recorded: 2005
- Genre: Punk rock
- Length: 4:54
- Label: EMI
- Songwriter(s): Chris Cheney
- Producer(s): Nick Launay

The Living End singles chronology
"Long Live the Weekend" (2006)	"Nothing Lasts Forever" (2006)	"White Noise" (2008)

"Nothing Lasts Forever" is a song by Australian punk rock band The Living End. It was first released in Australia on 19 September 2006, as the fourth single from the band's album State of Emergency.

The song charted at #39 of the Australian ARIA charts. It was the song played by Australian TV channel SBS for the video for stage 15 of the 2006 Tour de France.

== Track listing ==
All tracks written by Chris Cheney.

1. "Nothing Lasts Forever" – 4:54
2. "What's on Your Radio" (Live) – 3:17
3. "Long Live the Weekend" (Live) – 2:55
