= Tabloid Magazine =

Tabloid Magazine may refer to:

- a gossip magazine, also known as a tabloid magazine
- Tabloid Magazine (song), a song by the Australian rock group The Living End
