= Moment in the Sun (The Living End song) =

Single by The Living End

from the album White Noise
- Released: 25 October 2008
- Recorded: 2008
- Genre: Punk rock
- Length: 4:23
- Label: Dew Process
- Songwriter(s): Chris Cheney
- Producer(s): John Agnello; The Living End

The Living End singles chronology
"White Noise" (2008)	"Moment in the Sun" (2008)	"Raise the Alarm" (2008)

"Moment in the Sun" is the fourth track and second single from Australian rock band The Living End's album White Noise. The song was released to radio stations on 25 September 2008 and had its physical (as well as digital) release on 25 October 2008.

"Moment in the Sun" debuted on its first week of release (November 2008) at #100 on the Australian ARIA Singles Chart, remaining in the chart for one week.

== Track listing ==
All tracks written by Chris Cheney.

1. "Moment in the Sun" – 4:23
2. "New Frontier" – 4:20

Digital track listing

1. "Moment in the Sun" – 4:23
2. "Beware the Moon – 3:49

== Charts ==
Chart performance for "Moment in the Sun"
Chart (2008)	Peak position
Australia (ARIA)	100
