= Raise the Alarm (song) =

Single by The Living End

from the album White Noise
- Released: 22 December 2008
- Recorded: 2008
- Genre: Punk rock
- Length: 3:38
- Label: Dew Process
- Songwriter(s): Chris Cheney
- Producer(s): John Agnello; The Living End

The Living End singles chronology
"Moment in the Sun" (2008)	"Raise the Alarm" (2008)	"The Ending Is Just the Beginning Repeating" (2011)

"Raise the Alarm" is a song by Australian rock band The Living End, released on 22 December 2008. It is the second track and third single from their album White Noise. A music video was released containing footage of the band performing live throughout the band's White Noise tour and footage of their recording sessions. The single was released on iTunes on 27 February 2009.

== Track listing ==
All tracks written by Chris Cheney.

1. "Raise the Alarm" – 3:37
2. "Faith" (Demo) – 2:38

== Charts ==
Chart performance for "Raise the Alarm"
Chart (2009)	Peak position
Australia (ARIA)	68
