= White Noise (The Living End album) =

Studio album by The Living End
- Released: 19 July 2008 (Australia)
- Recorded: Water Music Studios in Hoboken, New Jersey (2008)
- Genres: Punk rock, alternative rock
- Length: 44:26
- Label: Dew Process
- Producer: John Agnello

The Living End chronology
State of Emergency (2006)	White Noise (2008)	Rarities (2008)

Singles from White Noise
- 1. "White Noise" Released: 5 July 2008; 2. "Moment in the Sun" Released: 25 October 2008; 3. "Raise the Alarm" Released: on radio 22 December 2008

Professional ratings
Review scores
Source	Rating
AllMusic	3/5 stars
Bombshellzine.com	4/5 stars
The Dwarf.com.au	(positive)
FasterLouder.com.au	(positive)
Max	(positive)
Punknews.org	4/5 stars
Rolling Stone	4/5 stars

White Noise is the fifth studio album by Australian punk rock band The Living End, first released in Australia on 19 July 2008. It was the band's first album released on the record label Dew Process. A limited edition bonus DVD, recorded at ACDC Lane in Melbourne, was also released, featuring six live songs, four of which were songs from White Noise.

The album debuted at number two on the Australian Album Chart, achieving a Gold certification in its first week. It was nominated for Best Rock Album & Album of the Year at the 2008 ARIA Awards, winning the award for Best Rock Album 2008.

== Background ==
=== Pre-recording ===
After a live show in late 2006, the band was placed on hiatus due to the fatigue of lead vocalist Chris Cheney. Cheney took a number of months off, doing yoga for relaxation and consequently, inspiration. White Noise got its first real kick-start when he came up with the guitar riff from the first track "How Do We Know?", saying he "took it to the guys and they said 'That's the direction, write another 12 of those'". Cheney has said the brief departure "was the turmoil that had to happen", but he "was back on track".

In February 2008, The Living End, under the alias of The Longnecks, played a small tour across Victoria to road-test songs they had written for their fifth studio album. They played a handful of dates and used the audience's reaction to the new material as a guide to which songs sounded better in a live environment.

=== Recording and production ===
Pre-production for the album took place at Studio One in Collingwood, Melbourne with producer Kalju Tonuma. This included various co-writes including the track "Sum of Us". After the sonic blueprint of the album was established The Living End's new label suggested and assigned producer John Agnello, who has formerly done work with Sonic Youth and The Hold Steady. Band manager Rae Harvey selected Brendan O'Brien to mix and master the album. O'Brien begun work with The Living End literally a day after completing production on AC/DC's 2008 album Black Ice, and is notable for his work with high-profile bands such as Pearl Jam. These two were selected to help replicate their live sound inside a studio. The album was recorded by producer Agnello in April 2008, in New Jersey, United States.

=== Promotion ===
Only four days after the mastering of the album was completed, The Living End released a taster track titled "How Do We Know", which was posted on the Triple J website for download on 23 May 2008, available for one week only. Also as a promotion for the album a "White Noise Gizmo" was made available through the Nova Radio Station webpage, which Windows Vista users were able to download a taster of the album. This allowed two tracks a day to be heard from 14 to 18 July.

== Track listing ==
All tracks are written by C. Cheney.

No.	Title	Length
1.	"How Do We Know?"	4:14
2.	"Raise the Alarm"	3:37
3.	"White Noise"	3:44
4.	"Moment in the Sun"	4:22
5.	"Waiting for the Silence"	5:01
6.	"Make the Call"	4:00
7.	"Loaded Gun"	4:57
8.	"Kid"	3:33
9.	"21st Century"	3:28
10.	"Hey Hey Disbeliever"	3:37
11.	"Sum of Us"	3:49

=== Bonus CD ("Demos and Rarities") ===
No.	Title	Length
1.	"White Noise (Acoustic)"	3:55
2.	"Moment in the Sun (Acoustic)"	4:30
3.	"Tragedy (Demo)"	4:15
4.	"Ship is Sinking (Demo)"	3:24
5.	"Down to the Wire (Demo)"	5:17
6.	"Live to Love (Demo)"	4:25
7.	"Faith (Demo)"	2:38
8.	"New Trend (Demo)"	3:41
9.	"I Don't Wanna Wait (Demo)"	2:54
10.	"Enemy of Time (Demo)"	3:30
11.	"Who's on Your Side (Demo)"	3:15

=== DVD (Limited Edition) ===
All tracks recorded live at ACDC Lane, Melbourne.

No.	Title	Length
1.	"Raise the Alarm"	4:07
2.	"How Do We Know?"	4:18
3.	"Moment in the Sun"	4:21
4.	"Second Solution"	5:24
5.	"White Noise"	4:02
6.	"Jailbreak (featuring Jon Toogood of Shihad) (AC/DC cover)"	4:34
7.	"The Making of White Noise"	9:09

=== B-Sides ===
Song	Length	Source
"Listen Up Suzy"	2:08	White Noise (CD single)/Japanese edition bonus track (retitled as "Suzy")
"CIA"	4:24	White Noise (iTunes Single)
"Live to Love"	4:26	White Noise (Nokia music single)/ Rarities compilation as "Live to Love (demo)"
"Beware the Moon"	3:48	Universal Music Australia (free download) / Moment in the Sun (iTunes single)
"She's Calling Out"	4:08	White Noise (iTunes album)
"Hopeless" (demo)	4:09	White Noise (Nokia music album)
"New Frontier"	4:20	Japanese edition bonus track / Moment in the Sun (CD single)
"Faith (Demo)"	2:39	Raise the Alarm (CD single)

== Charts ==
=== Weekly charts ===
Chart (2008/09)	Peak position
Australian Albums (ARIA)	2
New Zealand Albums (RMNZ)	18

=== Year-end charts ===
Chart (2008)	Rank
Australian Albums Chart	45
Australian Artist Albums Chart	11

== Certifications ==
Region	Certification	Certified units/sales
Australia (ARIA)	Gold	35,000^{^}
^{^} Shipments figures based on certification alone.

== Personnel ==
The Living End

- Chris Cheney – vocals, guitar
- Scott Owen – double bass, backing vocals
- Andy Strachan – drums, backing vocals

Additional musicians

- Franz Nicolay (The Hold Steady) – keyboards & string arrangements
- Pinky Weitzman – viola
- Sarah Bernstein (musician) – violin
- Margaret White – violin
- Shandra Wolley – cello

Production

- Kalju Tonuma – pre-production & co-writing
- John Agnello – producer
- Brendan O'Brien – mixing
- Billy Bowers – pro tools engineer
- Dave Jones – mix assistant
- Kory Aaron – mix assistant
