= White Noise (The Living End song) =

Single by The Living End

from the album White Noise
- Released: 5 July 2008
- Recorded: 2008
- Genre: Punk rock
- Length: 3:44
- Label: Dew Process
- Songwriter: Chris Cheney
- Producer: John Agnello

The Living End singles chronology
"Nothing Lasts Forever" (2006)	"White Noise" (2008)	"Moment in the Sun" (2008)

"White Noise" is a song by Australian punk rock band The Living End. It was released on 5 July 2008, as the lead single from the band's album White Noise.

During the week of the song's release, it was the most played track on Australian radio stations and went on to top the Australian Airplay chart. The song has since been accredited platinum status in Australia. It also won the 2009 Song of the Year at the APRA Awards.

A music video for "White Noise" was produced, featuring The Living End playing on a car park rooftop in Brisbane. The single was also released on iTunes and Nokia Music, including bonus B-Sides.

== Track listing ==
All tracks written by Chris Cheney.

1. "White Noise" – 3:44
2. "How Do We Know" – 4:14
3. "Listen Up Suzie" – 2:08

iTunes track listing

1. "White Noise" – 3:44
2. "CIA" – 4:24

Nokia Music track listing

1. "White Noise" – 3:44
2. "Live to Love" – 4:27

== Charts ==
Chart (2008)	Peak Position
Australian ARIA Singles Chart	12
New Zealand RIANZ Top 40 Single Chart	26

=== Year-end charts ===
Country	Chart	Ranking
Australia	ARIA End of Year Physical Singles	52
Australia	ARIA End of Year Australian Artist Singles	10
Australia	ARIA End of Year Australian Digital Tracks	43
