= Basement Birds =

Australian rock group

- Origin: Perth, Western Australia, Australia
- Genres: Pop rock, alternative country
- Years active: 2009–2011
- Label: Inertia
- Past members: Kevin Mitchell; Steve Parkin; Josh Pyke; Kavyen Temperley
- Website: basementbirds.com.au

Basement Birds were an Australian indie pop rock band which formed in mid-2009 and comprised four singer-songwriters, Kevin Mitchell (of Jebediah, aka Bob Evans), Steve Parkin (ex-Vinyl, Autopilot, solo), Josh Pyke (ex-An Empty Flight, solo) and Kavyen Temperley (of Eskimo Joe). The members' mutual love of lush vocal harmonies and alt-country style was the basis for forming the project. Mitchell, Parkin and Temperley had each developed their careers in Perth.

Influences cited by the band include Crosby, Stills, Nash & Young and Wilco. Their first single, "Waiting for You" was debuted on Australian radio station Triple J's Drive program on 14 April 2010. Their sole album was released on 16 July 2010, which peaked at No. 12 on the ARIA Albums Chart. The group supported the album with a national tour, they last performed together in Perth in April 2011. At that time, Mitchell indicated that there were no plans to resume the project as each member returned to their respective groups or solo careers.

== History ==
=== Formation ===
Kavyen Temperley, singer-songwriter and bass guitarist for Eskimo Joe, proposed the idea of working in a harmony-driven group, which eventually resulted in Basement Birds, with fellow singer-songwriters when Josh Pyke (ex-An Empty Flight, solo) joined a national tour with Eskimo Joe. During 2008 Kevin Mitchell (singer-songwriter-guitarist of Jebediah) was working on his solo project as Bob Evans. In his backing band was Steve Parkin (ex-Vinyl, Autopilot, solo), another singer-songwriter and a lead guitarist.

The four members discussed creating a band over phone calls and emails. The initial vision was to record acoustic-based music which referenced their mutual influences of Crosby, Stills, Nash & Young and Wilco. Mitchell and Parkin started writing what would become the group's first single, "Waiting for You". Meanwhile, Pyke and Temperley had penned a track, "Reasons". Eventually both tracks were credited to all four members.

Luckily we all seem to have fairly similar tastes in music, I think it'd be harder if we had someone who was into death metal and another into jazz fusion. That'd be tough. There's enough common ground between the four of us.

— Steve Parkin

From mid-2009 Basement Birds started recording in four-week blocks at Temperley's home studio in Hamilton Hill, a Perth suburb.

"Waiting for You", the first single by Basement Birds, was released on 26 April 2010. It had been first aired by The Doctor aka Lindsay McDougall on the Drive program of national radio station, Triple J, on 14 April. Pyke revealed, in an accompanying interview, that the group hoped to tour in mid-2010.

The content of the group's debut album was released via iTunes digital downloads in the form of three extended play bundles and two singles, every couple of weeks. Carmine Pascuzzi of Mediasearch declared the bundles were "an Australian first". The initial such bundle included "Reasons", "Skin of the Sky" and "Bus Stop" (the latter featuring Julia Stone on guest vocals), which was released on iTunes on 17 May 2010.

Their self-titled album was physically released on 16 July and added the CD-only track, "All I Want", to the previously issued material. Aside from its four core members the session musicians were Rachael Aquilina on violin; Malcolm Clark on drums and percussion; Hugh Jennings on flute; Lee Jones on guitars, lap steel guitar and piano; Lucky Oceans on pedal steel guitar; Joel Quartermain on electric guitar; Shaun Luke Sibbes on drums and percussion; and Stone on guest vocals. It was co-produced by Basement Birds with Andy Lawson for Inertia Records.

AllMusic's Alexey Eremenko described it as "a good record anyway, full of nice vocal harmonies and acoustic guitar strumming, but not devoid of dynamics". Basement Birds peaked at No. 12 on the ARIA Albums Chart. Three iTunes exclusive acoustic sessions were also released in mid-2010. The group also provided a cover version of The Presets' single, "My People", for Triple J's "Like a Version" segment on 23 July.

Basement Birds supported the album with a national tour during August and September in 2010, thereafter gigs were intermittent and they last performed together in Perth in April 2011. At that time, Mitchell indicated that there were no plans to resume the group. Following the completion of the Basement Birds project, Mitchell rejoined Jebediah for its fifth album, Kosciuszko (15 April 2011), Temperley rejoined Eskimo Joe for its fifth album, Ghosts of the Past (12 August), Pyke resumed his solo career, releasing his third studio album, Only Sparrows (19 August), and Parkin relocated to Melbourne. Both Mitchell and Parkin signed to the publishing company, Select Music, in 2012.

== Members ==
- Kevin Mitchell – lead vocals, backing vocals, acoustic guitar (2009–11)
- Steve Parkin – lead vocals, backing vocals, toy piano (2009–11)
- Josh Pyke – lead vocals, backing vocals, acoustic guitar (2009–11)
- Kavyen Temperley – lead vocals, backing vocals, upright bass (2009–11)

== Discography ==
=== Studio albums ===
List of studio albums, with selected chart positions and certifications
Title	Album details	Peak chart positions
Title	Album details	AUS
Basement Birds	Released: 16 July 2010; Label: Basement Birds, Inertia (BB001CD); Formats: CD, digital download	12

=== Extended plays ===
List of extended plays
Title	Details
"Skin of the Sky"/"Reasons"/"Bus Stop"	Released: 17 May 2010; Label: Basement Birds; Format: DD
"Holly"/"Hardest Part"/"Heartache on the Radio"	Released: 29 June 2010; Label: Basement Birds; Format: DD
"Cinnamon and Smoke"/"All That I Feel"/"Ghosts"/"Hamilton Hill"	Released: 13 July 2010; Label: Basement Birds; Format: DD

=== Singles ===
Title	Year	Album
"Waiting for You"	2010	Basement Birds
"Not the One"	2010	Basement Birds

== Awards ==
=== AIR Awards ===
The Australian Independent Record Awards (commonly known informally as AIR Awards) is an annual awards night to recognise, promote and celebrate the success of Australia's Independent Music sector.

Year	Nominee / work	Award	Result
2010	themselves	Most Popular Independent Artist	Nominated

=== ARIA Music Awards ===
The ARIA Music Awards is an annual awards ceremony held by the Australian Recording Industry Association. They commenced in 1987.

Year	Nominee / work	Award	Result	Ref.
2010	Basement Birds	Best Adult Alternative Album	Nominated	
