= Steve Parkin (musician) =

Australian musician and singer-songwriter

- Born: Stephen Parkin; United Kingdom
- Origin: Perth, Western Australia, Australia
- Genres: alternative rock, indie pop, folk pop, garage pop, rock, acoustic, indie
- Occupations: Singer, songwriter, session musician, producer, writer, actor
- Years active: 1996–present
- Website: www.steveparkin.bandcamp.com

Steve Parkin is an Australian musician and singer-songwriter. Born in United Kingdom and raised in Perth. He is a founder member of 1990s Perth garage pop three-piece, Autopilot, who released two EPs, Pure Gold Baby in 1998 and Out of the Sun in 2001. He was also a band member of Basement Birds. He co-wrote material for Eskimo Joe's 2009 album Inshalla, which peaked at number one on the Australian Recording Industry Association (ARIA) Albums Chart. One of the tracks, "Foreign Land", won 'Most Played Australian Work' at the APRA Awards of 2010.

== Early life ==
Born in United Kingdom and raised in Perth. Steve’s father, Pete Parkin is also a musician of note.

== Music career ==
=== Vinyl ===
Parkin began his professional music career with short-lived Perth grunge-pop 3 piece, Vinyl, who released only one EP, Lazeryouthanasia, in 1996. It was produced by Ben Glatzer at Revolver Sound in Perth. Mastering was done with Wayne Bartley at Studio 301. Vinyl were briefly signed to a distribution deal with Polygram imprint [id/Mercury] but not long after signing, the distribution agreement failed to enter the development stage when Polygram and all of its subsidiary labels were bought by Universal Music resulting in Vinyl only releasing the one EP.

=== Autopilot ===
In 1998 Parkin formed another Perth indie-rock 3-piece, Autopilot, with Hugh Jennings and Jayde Smith, both previously members of Burnside. A debut 1999 seven-track release Pure Gold Baby received favourable reviews, including a four star review in Rolling Stone and high rotation on national radio networks including Triple J. Autopilot has been cited as an influence by later Perth bands including Eskimo Joe. They released a second EP, Out of the Sun, in 2001, which was followed by an extensive run of shows including a large national tour supporting Pollyanna. Neither of the two Autopilot "mini-albums" are currently available in a physical format, but they were re-mastered in 2013 and available digitally.

=== Solo performer ===
In 2005, touring as Steve Parkin and the Foreign Films his debut solo album, Sandytown, was released through Shock to favourable national reviews and reception. The album was produced by Debaser Studios, a production trio consisting of Joel Quartermain of Eskimo Joe, Rodney Aravena then a member of End of Fashion and Andy Lawson who is still a successful Perth music producer under the Debaser name. A second solo album, Mighty Big Light, was released in 2011 on Warner Music Australia imprint label Dirt Diamonds. Since 2012 there have been five home-recorded indie releases of original songs released through Bandcamp.

== Session musician ==
=== Bob Evans ===
From 2006 to early 2008 Parkin played keys and guitar for Kevin Mitchell (Jebediah).

=== Co-writing ===
Signed to Universal Music Publishing Group as a songwriter in 2013, Parkin has co-written songs with a number of other artists including Gossling, Lewis Watson, Ruby Boots, Shihad, Eskimo Joe, sharing in ARIA and APRA awards for single releases from Eskimo Joe's 2009 ARIA number one album Inshalla. "Foreign Land" from the album won 'Most Played Australian Work' at the APRA Awards of 2010.

=== Basement Birds ===
Parkin is a member of Basement Birds, a side project he shares with Kevin Mitchell, Josh Pyke and Kavyen Temperley of Eskimo Joe. They released their eponymous album in 2010 independently, which reached No. 12 in August 2010 and received an ARIA nomination in the Adult Alternative category. Described in the press as a collaborative folk-pop "supergroup", Basement Birds toured Australia.

== Awards ==
=== APRA Awards ===
The APRA Awards are presented annually from 1982 by the Australasian Performing Right Association (APRA).

Year	Nominee / work	Award	Result
2010	"Foreign Land" (Stuart MacLeod, Joel Quartermain, Steve Parkin, Kavyen Temperley) – Eskimo Joe	Most Played Australian Work	Won
2010	"Foreign Land" (Stuart MacLeod, Joel Quartermain, Steve Parkin, Kavyen Temperley) – Eskimo Joe	Rock Work of the Year	Won
2010	"Foreign Land" (Stuart MacLeod, Joel Quartermain, Steve Parkin, Kavyen Temperley) – Eskimo Joe	Song of the Year	Shortlisted
2012	"Love Is a Drug" (Stuart MacLeod, Joel Quartermain, Kav Temperley)	Rock Work of the Year	Nominated
