= Long Live the Weekend =

Single by The Living End

from the album State of Emergency
- Released: 20 May 2006
- Recorded: 2005
- Genre: Rock
- Length: 2:59
- Label: EMI
- Songwriter: Chris Cheney Producer = Nick Launay

The Living End singles chronology
"Wake Up" (2006)	"Long Live the Weekend" (2006)	"Nothing Lasts Forever" (2006)

"Long Live the Weekend" is the third single from The Living End's fourth album, State of Emergency. It was released on 20 May 2006 in Australia. The song was one of the most added to Australian radio during April. Despite this, "Long Live the Weekend" did not enter the top twenty – whilst the earlier two singles from the album entered the top ten – peaking on the ARIA charts at twenty-three.

== Track listing ==
1. "Long Live the Weekend" (C. Cheney) - 2:59
2. "Flood the Sky" (S. Owen) - 2:56
3. "Ape Face" (instrumental) (C. Cheney) - 3:00
4. "Blue Moon of Kentucky" (acoustic cover) (Bill Monroe) - 1:54
