= State of Emergency (The Living End album) =

Studio album by The Living End
- Released: 4 February 2006 (Australia)
- Studio: Studios 301 (Byron Bay)
- Genres: Punk rock; rock; punkabilly
- Length: 51:45
- Labels: EMI; Adeline
- Producer: Nick Launay

The Living End chronology
| From Here On In (2004) | State of Emergency (2006) | White Noise (2008) |

The Living End video chronology
| From Here on In: The DVD 1997–2004 (2004) | How to Make an Album and Influence People (2006) | Live at Festival Hall (2006) |

Singles from State of Emergency
- 1. "What's on Your Radio" Released: 21 November 2005; 2. "Wake Up" Released: 20 February 2006; 3. "Long Live the Weekend" Released: 20 May 2006; 4. "Nothing Lasts Forever" Released: 19 August 2006

Professional ratings
Review scores
| Source | Rating |
|---|---|
| AbsolutePunk | (93%) |
| Allmusic | 4/5 stars |
| Punknews.org | 4.5/5 stars |
| Q | 3/5 stars |

State of Emergency is the fourth studio album by Australian punk rock band The Living End, released in Australia and New Zealand on 4 February 2006 and internationally on 11 July 2006. It debuted in the number one position of the Australian ARIA charts. The album's first single was "What's on Your Radio", released in November 2005. The follow-up single, "Wake Up" was released on 18 February 2006, and debuted at number 5 on the ARIA charts, making it the highest single debut position of the band (not including the EP Second Solution / Prisoner of Society).

At the J Award of 2006, the album was nominated for Australian Album of the Year.

The limited edition comes with a DVD, documenting the stages of the album's production and shows footage of the band's concerts, including performances as The Longnecks and at Splendour in the Grass. They also released a live DVD of the State of Emergency tour, Live at Festival Hall. A limited edition vinyl of the album, limited to 500 copies worldwide, was also released.

ARIA publicized that State of Emergency had officially achieved 2× platinum status in Australia in November 2007. The album is the band's second highest selling, behind the efforts of their record-breaking debut album.

== Background ==
In December 2005, The Living End, as The Longnecks, played gigs in Sydney featuring tracks from the album. This was to test out audience reactions to new songs in order to ready themselves for the Big Day Out music festival. Tracks were also given a live airing in festivals of late 2005 and early 2006, such as the 2005 Homebake festival at The Domain, Sydney.

The Living End played at Splendour in the Grass, a music festival in Byron Bay, the day before they were due to start recording State of Emergency. Band members decided that if they got positive reactions during their performance, they'd do well producing the record and be in the right frame of mind to do so.

== Track listing ==
All tracks are written by Chris Cheney, except where noted.

| No. | Title | Length |
|---|---|---|
| 1. | "'Til the End" | 4:27 |
| 2. | "Long Live the Weekend" | 2:54 |
| 3. | "No Way Out" | 2:40 |
| 4. | "We Want More" | 3:41 |
| 5. | "Wake Up" | 4:31 |
| 6. | "What's on Your Radio" | 3:02 |
| 7. | "Nothing Lasts Forever" | 4:52 |
| 8. | "One Step Behind" | 4:20 |
| 9. | "Reborn" | 3:49 |
| 10. | "Order of the Day" | 3:38 |
| 11. | "Nowhere Town" | 4:06 |
| 12. | "State of Emergency" | 2:58 |
| 13. | "Black Cat" (Chris Cheney, Scott Owen) | 3:45 |
| 14. | "Into the Red" | 3:08 |
| Total length: | | 51:45 |

Limited edition DVD
| No. | Title | Length |
|---|---|---|
| 1. | "How to Make an Album and Influence People" | 57:29 |

=== How to Make an Album and Influence People ===
How to Make an Album and Influence People is a documentary DVD covering the making of State of Emergency, showing live and behind the scenes footage of the band. Starting from laying down the basic tracks in a practice studio, to the re-introduction of Nick Launay (producer of the band's second studio album, Roll On) and playing a gig at Splendour in the Grass in 2005, before heading to the studio to record and mix the album. The DVD came as a bonus with the limited edition album.

== Personnel ==
The Living End

- Chris Cheney – vocals, guitar
- Scott Owen – double bass, backing vocals
- Andy Strachan – drums, backing vocals

Backing vocals on "Wake Up"

- Christina Bell
- Michael Bell
- John Boneventura
- Ruby Bryant
- Olivia Bunting
- Eva Conner
- Scarlett Conner
- Jessica Dredge
- Alan Gibson
- Mila Grant
- India Murphy
- D'arcy Noonan
- Mia Quinsee-Jarvis
- Rebecca Schwarz
- Nicholas Schwarz

Visuals and imagery

- Alison Smith – art direction
- Chris Cheney – art direction
- James Pipino – cover photography, studio photography
- Martin Philby – booklet photography
- Scott Ebsary – disc photography

Instruments

- Justine Jones – horns
- Jack Howard – horns
- Jeremy Smith – horns
- Michael Waters – horns

Technical and production

- Nick Launay – production, mixing, engineering
- Jimmi Maroudas – mixing of "Into the Red"
- Steve Smart – mastering
- Matt Handley – guitar tech
- Ant Milne – drum tech, bass tech

Managerial

- Rae Harvey – management
- Josh O'Donnell – A&R
- Stephen Zagami – tour management
- Jim Scott – FOH
- Owen Orford – bookings
- Darryl Eaton – bookings
- Mike Dewdney – bookings

== Charts ==
=== Weekly charts ===
| Chart (2006) | Peak position |
|---|---|
| Australian Albums (ARIA) | 1 |
| New Zealand Albums (RMNZ) | 31 |

=== Year-end charts ===
| Chart (2006) | Rank |
|---|---|
| Australian Albums Chart | 66 |
| Australian Artist Albums Chart | 21 |

== Certifications ==
| Region | Certification | Certified units/sales |
|---|---|---|
| Australia (ARIA) | Platinum | 70,000^{^} |
^{^} Shipments figures based on certification alone.

== Release history ==
| Region | Date | Label | Format | Catalogue | Ref. |
|---|---|---|---|---|---|
| Australia | 4 February 2006 | EMI | CD, LP | 3529852 | |
| Japan | 21 June 2006 | Victor | CD | VICP-63437 | |
| United States and Canada | 11 July 2006 | Adeline Records, EastWest | CD, LP | 30034 | |
| United Kingdom | 13 August 2007 | Deck Cheese Records | CD | DECK 036 | |
| Australia | 3 September 2010 | Redcat Sounds | CD, digital download | RCSCD04 | |
| Worldwide | 21 December 2018 | BMG | Digital download | —N/a | |
