= Foreign Land (song) =

Single by Eskimo Joe

from the album Inshalla
- Released: 3 April 2009
- Recorded: 2008
- Genre: Alternative rock, hard rock
- Length: 4:30
- Label: Warner
- Songwriters: Eskimo Joe (Joel Quartermain, Kavyen Temperley & Stuart MacLeod), Steve Parkin
- Producer: Gil Norton

Eskimo Joe singles chronology
"London Bombs" (2007)	"Foreign Land" (2009)	"Losing Friends Over Love" (2009)

"Foreign Land" is a song by Australian rock band Eskimo Joe. It was released in April 2009 as the lead single from their fourth studio album Inshalla. The song was the most added song on Australian radio in April 2009, and peaked at number 13 on the ARIA Charts and was certified gold. The single contains elements of traditional Turkish folk music from Adiyaman, Turkey.

The song was written as a tribute to Australian actor Heath Ledger, who died in January 2008.

The song placed second in the 2009 Vanda & Young Global Songwriting Competition.

At the APRA Music Awards of 2010, the song won Most Played Australian Work and Rock Work of the Year.

== Background ==
The lyrics were borne from a poignant day in New York City when an emotionally drained Temperley stepped out for a walk.

It had just started snowing. It was a magical moment. That night we had to do this Australia gig, and when we got to it we found out that Heath Ledger had died. He'd died two blocks from where I was walking and at the time I was walking and it started snowing. He was from Perth and we were in New York City, this big foreign city, and I felt this immense loneliness of this kid from my hometown dying by himself there.

— Kav Temperley

The song has been used on TV shows such as The World's Strictest Parents and Sunday Night.

== Track listing ==
All tracks are written by Eskimo Joe.

iTunes single
No.	Title	Length
1.	"Foreign Land" (Radio Edit)	4:02

CD single
No.	Title	Length
1.	"Foreign Land"	4:29
2.	"Falling Too Fast"	4:36
3.	"Sinners and Saints"	3:50

iTunes EP
No.	Title	Length
1.	"Foreign Land"	4:28
2.	"Falling Too Fast"	4:35
3.	"Sinners and Saints"	3:50
4.	"Foreign Land" (Demo)	4:49

== Charts ==
Chart (2009)	Peak position
Australia (ARIA)	13

== Certifications ==
Region	Certification	Certified units/sales
Australia (ARIA)	Gold	35,000^{^}
^{^} Shipments figures based on certification alone.

== Release history ==
Region	Date	Label	Format	Catalogue
Australia	3 April 2009	Warner, Mushroom	Digital download	-
Australia	17 April 2009	Warner, Mushroom	CD, Digital download	5186538032
