= Rarities (The Living End album) =

Compilation album by The Living End
- Released: 15 November 2008
- Genre: Rock, alternative, acoustic
- Length: 41:49
- Label: Dew Process

The Living End chronology
White Noise (2008)	Rarities (2008)	The Ending Is Just the Beginning Repeating (2011)

Rarities is a compilation album by Australian rock band The Living End. The album features demos and acoustic versions of songs that were previously unreleased, and was first available on a range of online music stores for 5 days from 15 to 19 November 2008, at which point it was taken off the stores for no confirmed reason. The album was released exclusively online, until its physical release as part of a double CD deluxe edition of the band's fifth studio album, White Noise, on 27 February 2009.

== Track listing ==
No.	Title	Length
1.	"White Noise (Acoustic)"	3:55
2.	"Moment in the Sun (Acoustic)"	4:30
3.	"Tragedy (Demo)"	4:15
4.	"The Ship Is Sinking (Demo)"	3:23
5.	"Down to the Wire (Demo)"	5:16
6.	"Live to Love (Demo)"	4:24
7.	"Faith (Demo)"	2:37
8.	"New Trend (Demo)"	3:41
9.	"I Don't Wanna Wait (Demo)"	2:54
10.	"Enemy of Time (Demo)"	3:30
11.	"Who's on Your Side (Demo)"	3:15
Total length:		41:49
