= Modern Artillery =

Studio album by the Living End
- Released: 28 October 2003
- Recorded: 2003
- Studio: Ocean (Burbank, California)
- Genre: Punk rock; pop punk; alternative rock; electronic rock
- Length: 49:43
- Label: EMI (2003); Reprise (2004)
- Producer: Mark Trombino

The Living End chronology
Roll On (2000)	Modern Artillery (2003)	From Here on In (2004)

Modern Artillery (stylized as MODERN ARTillery) is the third studio album by Australian punk rock band the Living End, released on 28 October 2003 internationally and on 2 March 2004 in the United States. It is the first album to feature drummer Andy Strachan, since Travis Demsey had left the band after their second album, Roll On.

The song "Who's Gonna Save Us?" was released as a single and appeared in commercials for the documentary film Fahrenheit 9/11. "End of the World" is featured on the soundtrack for the video game Tony Hawk's Underground 2.

ARIA publicised that the album had officially achieved platinum status in Australia in November 2007.

== Track listing ==
All tracks are written by Chris Cheney, except where noted

Modern Artillery track listing
No.	Title	Length
1.	"What Would You Do?" (Scott Owen)	1:28
2.	"One Said to the Other"	2:46
3.	"Who's Gonna Save Us?"	3:21
4.	"End of the World"	3:36
5.	"Jimmy"	3:29
6.	"Tabloid Magazine"	3:21
7.	"In the End"	4:16
8.	"Maitland Street"	4:07
9.	"Putting You Down"	3:47
10.	"Short Notice" (Owen, Cheney, Andy Strachan)	2:43
11.	"So What?"	2:58
12.	"Rising Up from the Ashes"	3:16
13.	"Hold Up"	2:28
14.	"The Room"	8:07
Total length:		49:43

- On vinyl releases of the album, the tracks "One Said to the Other" and "Tabloid Magazine" are swapped.

=== Bonus DVD ===
Released as a limited edition bonus DVD with the Australian version of the album, it includes six live tracks from Splendour in the Grass 2003, as well as backstage footage. All tracks were recorded live at Splendour in the Grass, Byron Bay, Australia.

1. "Roll On"
2. "Save the Day"
3. "Carry Me Home"
4. "West End Riot"
5. "E-Boogie"
6. "Second Solution"

== Singles ==
- "One Said to the Other" (2003) – #19 Australia, Triple J Hottest 100, 2002 #52
- "Who's Gonna Save Us?" (2003) – #37 Australia, Triple J Hottest 100, 2003 #23
- "Tabloid Magazine" (2003) – Triple J Hottest 100, 2003 #66

== Personnel ==
- Chris Cheney – vocals, guitar
- Scott Owen – double bass, vocals
- Andy Strachan – drums

== Charts ==
Chart performance for Modern Artillery
Chart (2003)	Peak position
Australian Albums (ARIA)	3
New Zealand Albums (RMNZ)	43

== Certifications ==
Certifications for Modern Artillery
Region	Certification	Certified units/sales
Australia (ARIA)	Platinum	70,000^{^}
^{^} Shipments figures based on certification alone.
