= Black Fingernails, Red Wine =

Studio album by Eskimo Joe
- Released: 10 June 2006
- Recorded: December 2005 – January 2006
- Genre: Alternative rock; pop rock; hard rock
- Length: 42:37
- Label: Mushroom; Warner
- Producer: Eskimo Joe

Eskimo Joe chronology
A Song Is a City (2004)	Black Fingernails, Red Wine (2006)	Beating like a Drum (2007)

Singles from Black Fingernails, Red Wine
- 1. "Black Fingernails, Red Wine" Released: 15 May 2006; 2. "Sarah" Released: 18 September 2006; 3. "New York" Released: 5 February 2007; 4. "Breaking Up" Released: June 2007; 5. "London Bombs" Released: 6 October 2007

Professional ratings
Review scores
Source	Rating
The Age	4/5 stars
AllMusic	3.5/5 stars
The Herald Sun	4/5 stars

Black Fingernails, Red Wine is the third studio album by Eskimo Joe, released on 10 June 2006. The album became their first number one on the Australian ARIA Albums Chart, debuting atop the chart in the week of 19 June 2006. The album was certified 4× Platinum in Australia. It is their best selling album to date. It was released as the band's debut album in the United States on 25 September 2007.

In early 2007 a special edition of the album was released featuring a bonus remix EP that was originally sold at Eskimo Joe concerts during their Beating like a Drum tour.

On 10 March 2019, an anniversary edition of the album was released as a two-disc set and saw the album's release for the first time on vinyl.

In December 2021, the album appeared at number 67 on Rolling Stone Australia's "The 200 Greatest Australian Albums of All Time" list.

== Production ==
To record the album the band enlisted sound engineer Matt Lovell (The Mess Hall, Jebediah, Sleepy Jackson), and also took on production duties themselves for the first time.

The album is noted for being heavily influenced by the production techniques and sound of early 1980s rock, with many similarities to vintage Icehouse and INXS. This led to Tony Martin (Get This, Triple M) back-announcing their songs by calling them 'INXSkimo Joe'. Kavyen Temperley explained: "I always think of things in a concept-record type of way. So I wanted to make a record as if we were a stadium rock band" "If we were like INXS, what kind of record would I want to write?".

The band recorded Black Fingernails, Red Wine on the central coast of NSW's The Grove Studios. The Grove Studios were originally known as Mangrove Studio and were formerly owned by INXS bass player Garry Gary Beers.

== Cover art ==
The cover art, by Brisbane artist Dane Lovett, is made up of three full separate artworks of the band members. The full pictures were used for the covers of the singles (left to right) "New York", "Black Fingernails, Red Wine" and "Sarah".

== Track listing ==
All tracks are written by Eskimo Joe.

No.	Title	Length
1.	"Comfort You"	3:20
2.	"New York"	3:52
3.	"Black Fingernails, Red Wine"	4:09
4.	"Breaking Up"	3:23
5.	"Setting Sun" (^{1})	3:52
6.	"London Bombs"	3:51
7.	"Sarah"	3:29
8.	"This Is Pressure"	4:09
9.	"Beating like a Drum"	3:03
10.	"Reprise"	1:59
11.	"Suicide Girl"	3:04
12.	"How Does It Feel"	4:29

^{1.} "Setting Sun" was previously known as "Forever Young".

Beating like a Drum
No.	Title	Length
1.	"Black Nails from the Red Sea" (Nixmix; Remixed by Nick Launay)	6:33
2.	"Beating like a Drum" (Dexter's Raskol Mix; Remixed by G. Mcquilten, A. Ingram, D. Faby & V. Juste-Constant)	5:02
3.	"London Bombs" (Sneaky Sound System Remix; Additional production by Black Angus & Peter Dolso)	5:01
4.	"Comfort You" (P-Money Mix; produced, mixed & arranged by P- Money)	3:57
5.	"New York" (Teenager South of Huston Mix; Mixed by Teenager)	4:52
6.	"Sarah" (The Bumblebeez Rmx; Remixed by the Bumblebeez Produced by Invisibl)	3:37

This remix EP was released with the special edition of Black Fingernails, Red Wine, to promote the Beating like a Drum tour.

Bonus US DVD
No.	Title	Length
1.	"Black Fingernails, Red Wine" (Nash Edgerton version)
2.	"Sarah"
3.	"New York"
4.	"Breaking Up"

B-sides
No.	Title	Length
1.	"Japanese Waitress"	3:00
2.	"Don't Get Me Wrong"	4:50
3.	"Trying to Sleep"	2:56
4.	"One Little Desire Called Love"	1:43
5.	"Hey"	3:20

2019 anniversary edition: Disc 1
No.	Title	Length
1.	"Comfort You"	3:20
2.	"New York"	3:52
3.	"Black Fingernails, Red Wine"	4:09
4.	"Breaking Up"	3:23
5.	"Setting Sun"	3:52
6.	"London Bombs"	3:51
7.	"Sarah"	3:29
8.	"This Is Pressure"	4:09
9.	"Beating like a Drum"	3:03
10.	"Reprise"	1:59
11.	"Suicide Girl"	3:04
12.	"How Does It Feel"	4:29
13.	"Trying to Sleep"	2:56
14.	"Japanese Waitress"	3:00
15.	"Don't Get Me Wrong"	4:51
16.	"One Little Desire Called Love"	1:43
17.	"Black Nails from the Red Sea" (Nixmix)	6:33
18.	"London Bombs" (Sneaky Sound System Remix)	5:01
19.	"Beating Like a Drum" (Dexter's Raskol Mix)	5:02
20.	"Black Fingernails, Red Wine" (Le Sauvage Mix)	5:15

2019 anniversary edition: Disc 2
No.	Title	Length
1.	"Comfort You" (live at the Enmore)	3:24
2.	"New York" (live at the Enmore)	4:01
3.	"Black Fingernails, Red Wine" (live at the Enmore)	4:20
4.	"London Bombs" (live at the Enmore)	3:54
5.	"From the Sea" (live at the Enmore)	3:47
6.	"How Does It Feel" (live at the Enmore)	4:09
7.	"Comfort You/New York" (live at the Chapel)	7:05
8.	"Black Fingernails, Red Wine" (live at the Chapel)	4:13
9.	"Sarah" (live at the Chapel)	3:37
10.	"Forever Young" (live at the Chapel)	4:19
11.	"Black Fingernails, Red Wine" (acoustic)	4:01
12.	"Breaking Up" (acoustic)	3:13
13.	"How Does It Feel" (acoustic)	4:10
14.	"London Bombs" (acoustic)	3:50
15.	"This Is Pressure" (acoustic)	3:47
16.	"Black Fingernails, Red Wine" (acoustic, with strings)	3:58
17.	"Sarah" (September 2005 demo)	3:28
18.	"Breaking Up" (September 2005 demo)	3:00
19.	"Comfort You" (September 2005 demo)	3:28
20.	"Black Fingernails, Red Wine" (September 2005 demo)	4:10

== Personnel ==
Eskimo Joe

- Kav – bass guitars, keyboards, vocals
- Stu MacLeod – guitar, backing vocals,
- Joel Quartermain – drums, guitar, keyboards, backing vocals

== Charts ==
=== Weekly charts ===
Chart (2006/07)	Peak position
Australian Albums (ARIA)	1
New Zealand Albums (RMNZ)	20

=== Year-end charts ===
Chart (2006)	Rank
Australian Albums Chart	7
Chart (2007)	Rank
Australian Albums Chart	47

=== Decade-end charts ===
Chart (2000–09)	Position
Australian Albums (ARIA)	67
Australian Artist Albums (ARIA)	23

== Certifications ==
Region	Certification	Certified units/sales
Australia (ARIA)	4× Platinum	280,000^{^}
^{^} Shipments figures based on certification alone.

== Release history ==
Region	Date	Label	Format	Catalogue
Australia	10 June 2006	Mushroom, Warner	CD, Digital download	5101128442
Australia	5 May 2007	Mushroom, Warner	CD, Digital download	5144204312
United States	25 September 2007	Rykodisc	CD	10922
Australia	2019	Warner Music Australia	2xCD	5419704457
Australia	2019	Warner Music Australia	LP	5419702827
