= Breaking Up (song) =

2007 single by Eskimo Joe

Single by Eskimo Joe

from the album Black Fingernails, Red Wine
- Released: June 2007
- Studio: The Grove
- Length: 3:23
- Label: Warner, Mushroom
- Songwriters: Stuart MacLeod, Joel Quartermain, Kavyen Temperley
- Producer: Eskimo Joe

Eskimo Joe singles chronology
"New York" (2007)	"Breaking Up" (2007)	"London Bombs" (2007)

"Breaking Up" is a song by Australian alternative rock band Eskimo Joe, released in June 2007 as the fourth single from their third studio album, Black Fingernails, Red Wine (2006). "Breaking Up" peaked at number 83 on the Australian Singles Chart.

== Music video ==
The music video for the single was filmed at Bar Beach in Newcastle. The video features Kavyen Temperley and a girl who is played by Teresa Palmer spending the night at the beach. The other two members Joel and Stu do not appear in the video.

== Track listing ==
All tracks are written by Eskimo Joe.

CD single
No.	Title	Length
1.	"Breaking Up"	3:25
2.	"New York" (Wood(Roch) remix)	4:32
3.	"Breaking Up" (acoustic)	3:14
4.	"Black Fingernails, Red Wine" (acoustic with strings)	3:57

== Charts ==
Chart (2007)	Peak position
Australia (ARIA)	83

== Release history ==
Region	Date	Format	Label(s)	Catalogue	Ref.
Australia	June 2007	CD	Warner Music Australasia; Mushroom	5144220122	
