= Who's Gonna Save Us? =

Single by The Living End

from the album Modern ARTillery
- Released: 29 September 2003
- Recorded: 2003
- Genre: Punk rock
- Length: 3:21
- Label: EMI
- Songwriter(s): Chris Cheney
- Producer(s): Mark Trombino

The Living End singles chronology
"One Said to the Other" (2003)	"Who's Gonna Save Us?" (2003)	"Tabloid Magazine" (2004)

"Who's Gonna Save Us?" is a song by Australian punk rock band The Living End. It was released in Australia on 29 September 2003, as the first single (not including One Said to the Other as it was re-recorded for the album) from the band's third album, Modern Artillery. It was released in the United States on 2 March 2004.

The song reached number 37 on the ARIA Singles Chart and also charted in the US, peaking at number 26 on the Hot Modern Rock Tracks.

Billboard's Keith Caulfield described it as a "rollicking, politically tinged track" which is "crisp and on-point in its full throttle production".

The song appeared in the television commercial and soundtrack for Michael Moore's 2004 documentary film, Fahrenheit 9/11.

== Track listing ==
No.	Title	Length
1.	"Who's Gonna Save Us?"	3:21
2.	"No Return" (Demo)
3.	"The Avenue" (Demo)
4.	"Just Too Bad" (Demo)
