= The Hard Road (song) =

Single by Hilltop Hoods

from the album The Hard Road
- Released: 3 August 2006
- Recorded: 2003–2005; X Bred Production Studios, Adelaide, South Australia
- Genre: Australian hip hop
- Length: 4:06
- Label: Obese Records
- Songwriter(s): Barry Francis, Leon Russell, Matthew Lambert, Daniel Smith
- Producer(s): MC Suffa

Hilltop Hoods singles chronology
"Clown Prince" (2006)	"The Hard Road" (2006)	"What a Great Night" (2006)

"The Hard Road" is a song by Australian hip hop group, Hilltop Hoods. It is the second single taken from the Australian group's 2006 album of the same name. It was released by Obese Records in 2006 as a CD single and a 12" vinyl single. The CD single also included the music video for the song.

== Sampling ==
The song contains a sample from "Out in the Woods", a composition originally written by Leon Russell.

== Track listing ==
All tracks are written by Matthew Lambert (Suffa), Daniel Smith (Pressure), Barry Francis (DJ Debris) and L Lambert, except track 3 which was written by Lambert, Smith, Francis and Leigh Ryan.

The Hard Road
No.	Title	Length
1.	"The Hard Road"	4:07
2.	"The Hard Road" (Suffa Remix)	4:05
3.	"The Hard Road" (Plutonic Lab Remix)	3:43
4.	"Recapturing the Vibe" (Sesta Remix)	3:09
5.	"The Hard Road" (Instrumental)	4:09
6.	"The Hard Road" (Suffa Instrumental Remix)	4:04

== Personnel ==
- Artwork (graphic design) - Benjamin Funnell
- Artwork (illustration) - John Engelhardt
- Mastered - Neville Clark

== Certifications ==
Certifications for "The Hard Road"
Region	Certification	Certified units/sales
Australia (ARIA)	2× Platinum	140,000^{‡}
^{‡} Sales+streaming figures based on certification alone.

== Release history ==
Region	Date	Label	Format	Catalogue
Australia	3 August 2006	Obese	CD	OBR 047
Australia	1 October 2006	Obese	12" vinyl	OBR 047-2
