= Sarah (Eskimo Joe song) =

2006 single by Eskimo Joe

Single by Eskimo Joe

from the album Black Fingernails, Red Wine
- B-side: "Hey"
- Released: 18 September 2006
- Studio: The Grove
- Length: 3:29
- Label: Mushroom; Warner Music Australasia
- Songwriters: Stuart MacLeod; Joel Quartermain; Kavyen Temperley
- Producer: Eskimo Joe

Eskimo Joe singles chronology
| "Black Fingernails, Red Wine" (2006) | "Sarah" (2006) | "New York" (2007) |

"Sarah" is a song by Australian alternative rock band Eskimo Joe, released in September 2006 as the second single from their third studio album, Black Fingernails, Red Wine (2006). The song peaked at number 12 on the Australian Singles Chart. At the ARIA Music Awards of 2007, the song was nominated for Best Group.

== Music video ==
The music video features the band playing in a concert hall and a fourth person can be seen playing with the band.

== Track listing ==
CD single; iTunes EP
| No. | Title | Length |
|---|---|---|
| 1. | "Sarah" | 3:31 |
| 2. | "Hey" | 3:19 |
| 3. | "Black Fingernails, Red Wine" (acoustic) | 3:54 |
| 4. | "Black Fingernails, Red Wine" (live) | 4:06.5 |

iTunes single
| No. | Title | Length |
|---|---|---|
| 1. | "Sarah" | 3:29 |
| 2. | "Black Fingernails, Red Wine" (acoustic with strings) | 3:54 |

== Charts ==
=== Weekly charts ===
| Chart (2006) | Peak position |
|---|---|
| Australia (ARIA) | 12 |

=== Year-end charts ===
| Chart (2006) | Rank |
|---|---|
| Australia (ARIA) | 56 |

== Release history ==
| Region | Date | Format | Label(s) | Catalogue | Ref. |
|---|---|---|---|---|---|
| Australia | 18 September 2006 | CD | Mushroom; Warner Music Australasia | 5101159802 | |
