= One Said to the Other =

2003 single by Taxiride

Single by the Living End

from the album Modern ARTillery
- B-side: "What Would You Do?"; "Blinded"; "Fond Farewell"
- Released: 20 January 2003
- Length: 3:32
- Label: EMI
- Songwriter: Chris Cheney
- Producers: Lindsay Gravina, the Living End

The Living End singles chronology
"Dirty Man" (2001)	"One Said to the Other" (2003)	"Who's Gonna Save Us?" (2003)

"One Said to the Other" is a song by Australian punk rock band the Living End. It was released on 20 January 2003 as the first single from their third album, Modern ARTillery (2003). The song peaked at No. 19 on the Australian ARIA Singles Chart and was ranked No. 52 on Triple J's Hottest 100 for 2002.

== Track listing ==
Australian CD single

1. "One Said to the Other"
2. "What Would You Do?"
3. "Blinded"
4. "Fond Farewell"

== Charts ==
Chart (2003)	Peak position
Australia (ARIA)	19
