= Andy Strachan =

Australian rock musician (born 1974)

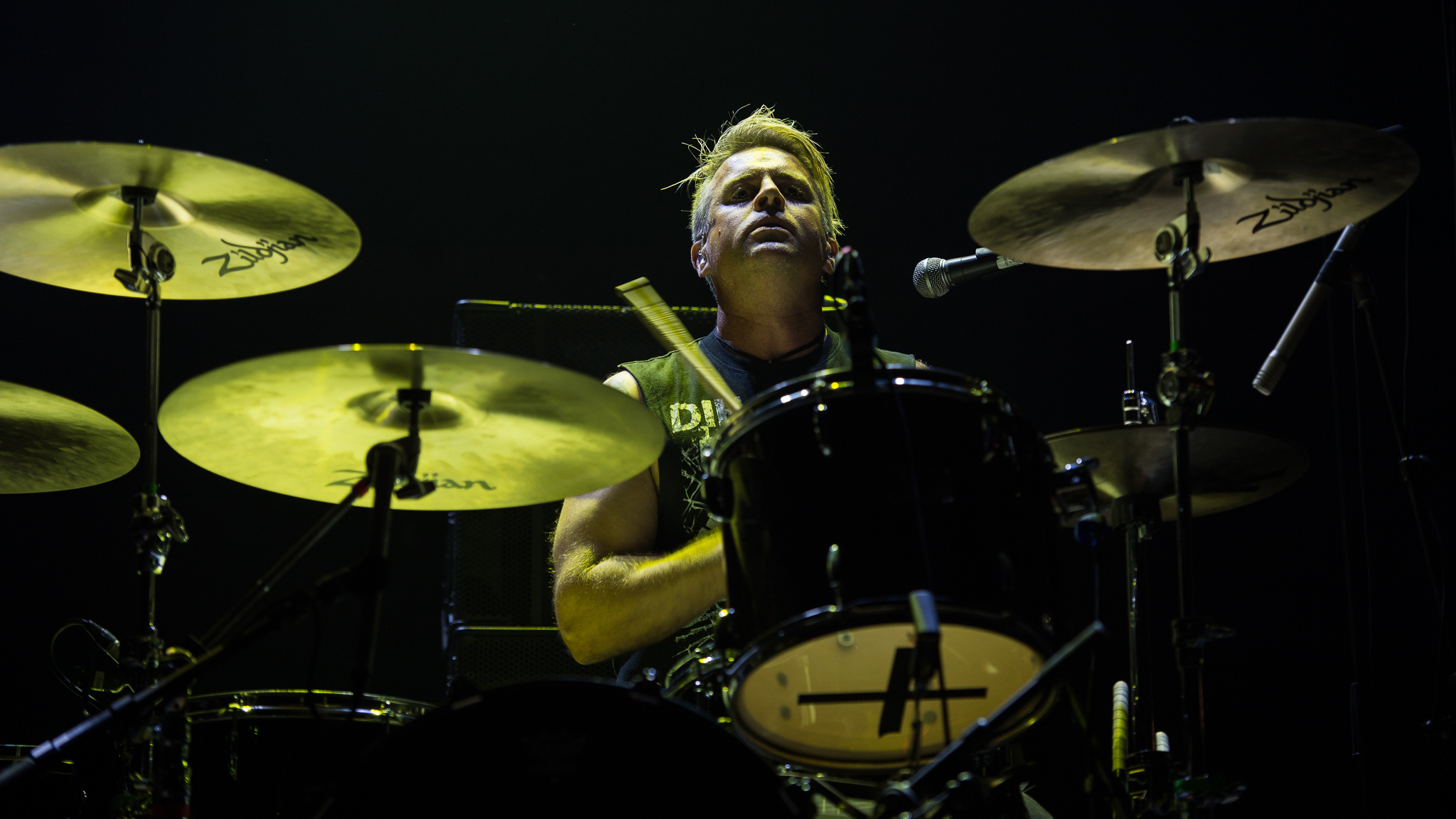
- Strachan in 2017

Background information
- Born: Andrew Douglas Strachan; 20 August 1974 (age 52); Adelaide, South Australia, Australia
- Genres: Alternative rock, punk rock
- Occupations: Musician, songwriter, backing vocals
- Instruments: Drums, percussion
- Years active: 1989–present
- Labels: EMI, Reprise
- Website: thelivingend.com.au

Andrew Douglas Strachan (born 20 August 1974) is an Australian rock musician. In 1994, after growing up in Adelaide, he relocated to Melbourne, and in 2000 he became the drummer of Sydney-based alternative rock group, Pollyanna. In 2002, he joined fellow alternative rockers, The Living End; they have issued four Top 5 albums on the ARIA Charts, Modern Artillery (No 3 in 2003), State of Emergency (No. 1 in 2006), White Noise (No. 2 in 2008) and The Ending Is Just the Beginning Repeating (No. 3 in 2011).

He is co-credited with Ash Grunwald on the 2013 album, Gargantua.

== Biography ==
Andrew Douglas Strachan was born on 20 August 1974 and grew up in Adelaide. Strachan completed secondary education at Aberfoyle Park High School, then studied Natural Therapies for three years and worked in hospitality doing restaurant work. Strachan had started drumming at the age of 12, receiving tuition from Frets and Stix music shop in Reynella. At age 15, he began in an Adelaide band, The Runaways, playing covers of mostly 1950s and 1960s songs – similar to future The Living End founders Chris Cheney and Scott Owen, whose earlier group, The Runaway Boys was a cover band in Melbourne in 1992.

In 1993 Strachan formed Poxsii Barccs with Gary Hopper on lead vocals, Paul Inglis on lead guitar and Toby Martin on bass guitar and backing vocals. In 1994 the group moved to Melbourne. In 1996 he formed the rock trio, Alcotomic, with John Baxter (ex-Holocene) and Denny Brereton. In 1998 Strachan's former bandmate, Paul Inglis replaced Brereton on bass guitar, in 2001 the band folded after releasing one self-titled EP and two singles. As a member of Alcotomic, Strachan shared songwriting credits with Baxter and Inglis on 13 tracks.

Strachan was in Latrobe Valley-based pop rockers P76, with Leigh Thomas on guitar and vocals, Danny McDonald on guitar and vocals, and Tim Mills on bass guitar. By 2000 he had joined Sydney alternate rockers Pollyanna, with Maryke Stapleton on vocals and Matt Handley on guitar.

=== The Living End ===
Early in 2002 Andy Strachan was introduced to alternate rockers, The Living End, upon the departure of their previous drummer Travis Demsey in February. While Strachan filled in on drums with the group – initially they played new material under the pseudonym The Longnecks – they continued auditions for a new drummer. Strachan later reflected that the early shows as The Longnecks "were more nerve-wracking than the big shows... There's always going to be guys in the crowd going, 'I can't wait to see him fuck up'. But I was very lucky in that Chris and Scott never treated me as 'that ring-in bloke'". On 20 March 2002, it was officially announced on The Living End website that he had joined the line-up, and his first release with the group was an extended play, One Said to the Other in January 2003, followed by their third studio album, Modern Artillery, in October. For the album, Strachan shared songwriting credits on "Short Notice" with Cheney and Owen. Allmusic's Johnny Loftus picked it as one of the album's best tracks, "1977 Upstarts colors won't wilt, even in the face of crackly drum programming and vocal filters. It's a representative song for a problematic yet still promising album stuck between engineered formula and real deal rock".

Modern Artillery peaked at number three on the ARIA Albums Chart, while, in February 2006, their next studio album, State of Emergency reached number one. Strachan won the 2006 Jack Award for Australia's Best Drummer. The Living End's next album, White Noise (July 2008) peaked at number two while their July 2011 album, The Ending Is Just the Beginning Repeating reached number three.

=== The Pants Collective ===
After their 2011 album The Ending Is Just The Beginning Repeating, The Living End took some time off from writing and recording. In this time, and with help and encouragement from Woody Annison, Strachan recorded and released a 6-song EP under the name The Pants Collective. This EP was released on 30 May 2014.

=== Personal life ===
By 2007 Andy Strachan was married to Jacki and from 2008 they were living in Barwon Heads.

== Awards and nominations ==
=== APRA Awards ===
The APRA Awards are presented annually from 1982 by the Australasian Performing Right Association (APRA).

Year	Nominee / work	Award	Result
2019	"Don't Lose It" - Chris Cheney, Scott Owen, Andy Strachan, Tobias Kuhn	Song of the Year	Shortlisted
2020	"Otherside" - Chris Cheney, Scott Owen, Andy Strachan, Tobias Kuhn	Most Performed Rock Work of the Year	Nominated
