= Wake Up (The Living End song) =

2006 single by the Living End

Single by the Living End

from the album State of Emergency
- B-side: "Girls Talk"; "Don't Turn Away"
- Released: 20 February 2006
- Length: 4:31
- Label: Capitol Music
- Songwriter: Chris Cheney
- Producer: Nick Launay

The Living End singles chronology
| "What's on Your Radio?" (2005) | "Wake Up" (2006) | "Long Live the Weekend" (2006) |

"Wake Up" is the second single from Australian punk band the Living End's fourth album, State of Emergency (2006). It was released on 20 February 2006, peaking at number five on the Australian ARIA Singles Chart and number 12 in New Zealand, becoming the band's highest-charting single in the latter nation.

"Wake Up" was ranked on the Triple J Hottest 100 for 2006 at number 53, becoming the band's last consecutive appearance on the ranking since 1997. The music video, directed by Sean Gilligan and Sarah-Jane Woulahan, was nominated for Best Video at the ARIA Music Awards of 2006.

== Track listing ==
Australian CD single

1. "Wake Up" (album version) (Chris Cheney) – 4:31
2. "Girls Talk" (Elvis Costello) – 3:08
3. "Don't Turn Away" (C. Cheney) – 4:04

== Charts ==
| Chart (2006) | Peak position |
|---|---|
| Australia (ARIA) | 5 |
| New Zealand (Recorded Music NZ) | 12 |
