= What a Great Night =

Single by Hilltop Hoods

from the album The Hard Road
- Released: 2 December 2006
- Recorded: 2003–2005; X Bred Production Studios, Adelaide, South Australia
- Genre: Australian hip hop
- Length: 3:06
- Label: Obese Records
- Songwriters: Matthew David Lambert, Daniel Howe Smith, Barry John M. Francis (DJ Debris),
- Producer: Hilltop Hoods

Hilltop Hoods singles chronology
"The Hard Road" (2006)	"What a Great Night" (2006)	"Recapturing the Vibe Restrung" (2007)

"What a Great Night" is a song by Australian hip hop group Hilltop Hoods. It was released in 2006 as the third single from their fourth studio album, The Hard Road.

The song was given a positive review by The Dwarf.

== Music video ==
The video for the song includes footage of the group performing live and together in a nightclub setting. As an editing technique, the camera pans vertically to reveal a new set or location.

== Track listing ==
All tracks are written by Matthew Lambert (Suffa), except track 6 which was written by M. Lambert, D. Smith (Pressure) & B. Francis (DJ Debris). Tracks 1–3 contain a sample of "For Pete's Sake" by Pete Rock & CL Smooth

What A Great Night
No.	Title	Length
1.	"What A Great Night" (Original Edit)	3:06
2.	"What A Great Night" (Simplex Remix)	3:20
3.	"What A Great Night" (F & D (Funkwig and deNorthwode) Remix)	3:40
4.	"What A Great Night" (Original Radio Edit)	3:06
5.	"What A Great Night" (Simplex Remix Radio Edit)	3:20
6.	"Recapturing the Vibe" (Radio Edit)	3:00
7.	"What A Great Night" (Original Instrumental)	3:06
8.	"What A Great Night" (Simplex Remix Instrumental)	3:22

On the re-release of The Hard Road entitled The Hard Road: Restrung, there is a verse by Pressure replacing Suffa's second verse.

== Personnel ==
- Artwork (Graphic Design) - Benjamin Funnell
- Artwork (Illustration) - John Engelhardt
- Mastered - Neville Clark
