= The Bumblebeez =

Australian musical group

- Origin: Braidwood, New South Wales, Australia
- Genres: Hip-hop, indie rock
- Labels: Bang Gang 12 Inches
- Members: Christopher Colonna; Pia Colonna

The Bumblebeez (previously known as Bumblebeez 81) are an Australian indie duo, formed by Christopher Colonna and his sister Pia Colonna (AKA Queen ViLa). The band's music has been described as a "cut'n'paste collision of noisy hip-hop and rock." Their full-length debut album was Prince Umberto & The Sister of Ill, released in 2007.

== History ==
The band was formed by Christopher Colonna and his sister Pia in Braidwood, New South Wales. The band was unearthed by the Australian radio station Triple J in 2002. Around the same time, they won a competition run by the ABC's short-lived Fly TV, making them the first to sign to the Fly Records label. In 2004, The Bumblebeez served as opener for Radiohead in Melbourne and Sydney.

The band released White Printz and Red Printz EP's, before compiling them into one album called The Printz for release in 2004.

The band released their first full-length album Prince Umberto and the Sister of Ill in September 2007, featuring the singles "Dr. Love" and "Rio". The album was selected as Triple J's "feature album," and nominated for a J Award on 28 November 2007. The album was mixed by Zdar of the French band Cassius. In May 2011, the EP I'm a Cowboi was released.

Their new single "Summer Bum" was premiered by Richard Kingsmill on his '2011' triple j show on Sunday 18 September.

== Discography ==
=== Albums ===
List of albums, with Australian chart positions
Title	Album details	Peak chart positions
Title	Album details	AUS
Prince Umberto & The Sister Of Ill	Released: August 2007; Format: CD; Label: 81 Records, Modular (MODCD046)	61

=== Compilation albums ===
List of EPs, with selected details
Title	Details
The Printz	Released: 2004; Format: CD; Label: 81 Records, Modular (B0002346-12)

=== Extended plays ===
List of EPs, with selected details
Title	Details
White Printz E.P	Released: December 2002; Format: CD; Label: Fly Music (12662)
Red Printz E.P	Released: 2003; Format: CD; Label: 81 Records, Modular (MODEP007)

=== Charting singles ===
List of charting single, with Australian chart positions
Title	Year	Peak chart positions	Album
Title	Year	AUS	Album
"Dr Love"	2007	79	Prince Umberto & The Sister Of Ill

== Awards and nominations ==
=== APRA Awards ===
The APRA Awards are presented annually from 1982 by the Australasian Performing Right Association (APRA), "honouring composers and songwriters". They commenced in 1982.

Year	Nominee / work	Award	Result	Ref.
2008	"Dr Love" (Christopher Colonna, Pia Colonna)	Urban Work of the Year	Nominated	

=== J Award ===
The J Awards are an annual series of Australian music awards that were established by the Australian Broadcasting Corporation's youth-focused radio station Triple J. They commenced in 2005.

Year	Nominee / work	Award	Result
J Awards of 2007	Prince Umberto and the Sister of Ill	Australian Album of the Year	Nominated
