= London Bombs (song) =

Single by Eskimo Joe

from the album Black Fingernails, Red Wine
- Released: 6 October 2007
- Studio: The Grove
- Length: 3:51
- Label: Warner Music Australasia, Mushroom
- Songwriter(s): Stuart MacLeod, Joel Quartermain, Kavyen Temperley
- Producer(s): Eskimo Joe

Eskimo Joe singles chronology
| "Breaking Up" (2007) | "London Bombs" (2007) | "Foreign Land" (2009) |

"London Bombs" is a song by Australian band Eskimo Joe, released digitally in October 2007 as the fifth and final single from their third studio album, Black Fingernails, Red Wine (2006). The song was awarded first place in the Performance Category at the 2007 International Songwriting Competition.

== Track listings ==
All tracks are written by Eskimo Joe

iTunes single
| No. | Title | Length |
|---|---|---|
| 1. | "London Bombs" | 3:49/3:51 |

== Release history ==
| Region | Date | Format | Label(s) | Ref(s). |
|---|---|---|---|---|
| Australia | 6 October 2007 | Digital download | Warner Music Australasia; Mushroom | |
