= New York (Eskimo Joe song) =

2007 single by Eskimo Joe

Single by Eskimo Joe

from the album Black Fingernails, Red Wine
- B-side: "One Little Desire Called Love"
- Released: 5 February 2007
- Studio: The Grove
- Length: 3:52
- Label: Mushroom; Warner Music Australasia
- Songwriters: Stuart MacLeod; Joel Quartermain; Kavyen Temperley
- Producer: Eskimo Joe

Eskimo Joe singles chronology
"Sarah" (2006)	"New York" (2007)	"Breaking Up" (2007)

"New York" is a song by Australian alternative rock band Eskimo Joe, released in February 2007 as the third single from the group's third studio album, Black Fingernails, Red Wine (2006. The song peaked at number 26 on the Australian Singles Chart.

== Music video ==
The band flew to New York to film a music video for the single. It was first shown on ABC's all night music program, Rage on 15 December 2006.

The music video is unusual for Eskimo Joe, with the lead singer, Kavyen Temperley, changing T-shirts. It was filmed on the streets of New York while Temperley walks backward with smoke coming out of his mouth. It then pans to the band running in Central Park in a similar style to the "Who Sold Her Out" video.

The director, Stuart MacLeod, commented "The concept basically was going to be a Bob Dylan-esque sort of thing, but instead of placards with key lyrics on, Kav was going to be walking down the street taking off t-shirts. Each new t-shirt underneath had a new key lyric on it."

After a quick mock-up at home, the logistics of donning T-shirts in real time proved more difficult than anticipated. In frustration, MacLeod hit the rewind button and the sudden flurry of activity saw the concept morph into a music video. The flash of inspiration meant that Temperley had to learn all of the lyrics to New York in reverse and to not only negotiate walking and talking backwards, but to work his way through over 50 T-shirts as well. "He had his hands full that's for sure," MacLeod said. "Me and Joel just pop up in the background now and then. We even added a bit of smoke coming out of his mouth, like the mist coming out of the grates in Manhattan."<

== Track listings ==
All tracks are written by Eskimo Joe.

CD single
No.	Title	Length
1.	"New York"	3:54
2.	"One Little Desire Called Love"	1:43
3.	"Sarah" (live at MAX Sessions)	3:40
4.	"London Bombs" (live at MAX Sessions)	3:55

All tracks are written by Eskimo Joe.

iTunes EP
No.	Title	Length
1.	"New York"	3:52
2.	"One Little Desire Called Love"	1:43
3.	"Sarah" (live from Max Sessions)	3:40
4.	"London Bombs" (live from Max Sessions)	3:55
5.	"How Does It Feel" (acoustic)	4:10

== Charts ==
Chart (2007)	Peak position
Australia (ARIA)	26

== Release history ==
Region	Date	Format	Label(s)	Catalogue	Ref.
Australia	5 February 2007	CD	Mushroom; Warner Music Australasia	5101191052	
