= Pollyanna (band) =

Australian band

- From left to right: Maryke Stapleton, Matt Handley and Serge Luca in 1996

Background information
- Origin: Sydney, New South Wales, Australia
- Genres: Alternative rock; indie rock; power pop
- Years active: 1992–2002
- Labels: Bark/Mushroom/Festival; Shock; DeSoto
- Spinoff of: Catherine Wheel
- Past members: Andrea Croft; Matt Handley; Serge Luca; Maryke Stapleton; Glenn Maynard; Andy Strachan; Adrian Whitehead; Sam Holloway; Shaun Lohoar; Richard Coneliano

Pollyanna was an indie rock band that formed in Sydney, Australia in early 1992.

They released four studio albums: Long Player (1996), Hello Halo (1997), Delta City Skies (1999) and Didn't Feel a Thing (2001). Long Player, their highest-charting release, peaked at No. 31 on the ARIA Albums Chart. Two of their tracks, 'Pale Grey Eyes' and 'Lemonsuck', were listed on the 1995 Triple J Hottest 100. The group were nominated for Breakthrough Artist – Album and Best Alternative Release for Long Player at the ARIA Music Awards of 1996. The band broke up in 2002.

== History ==
=== 1992–1993: Formation ===
Pollyanna formed in Sydney in early 1992. The original line-up was Andrea Croft on vocals and guitar, Matt Handley on vocals and guitar, Maryke ('Rayke') Stapleton on bass guitar, and Serge Luca on drums. Demo tapes were recorded in July 1992 and March 1993 but there were no official releases with this line-up. After Croft left the band in June 1993 to return home to Perth, the remaining members continued as a three-piece, with Handley, reluctantly at first, taking over lead singer and songwriting duties.

Croft and Handley had been in a local pop band, Catherine Wheel, which had issued an extended play, Self Portraits in 1992. Croft had previously been a member of The Honeys (originally from Perth), which had released an album, Goddess (1988). Croft later recalled why she left The Honeys, "I wanted to try something different. We'd been touring pretty intensely over a few years – me and four smelly boys in a Holden HG. I wanted to try something poppy. It wasn't a big blow up." After Catherine Wheel, Croft co-wrote some tracks with Handley and Greg Atkinson (Ups And Downs, Big Heavy Stuff). She eventually left Pollyanna due to homesickness, "In the end I just came home to Perth where all my family is. I'm a little boomerang – I always come back home."

=== 1994–1995: EPs ===
Pollyanna's five-track first extended play, FordGreenSilverRocket, was released in October 1994 through Bark. Bark signed Pollyanna after they discovered the band by chance at a Sydney show at Feedback, Newtown in August 1994. 'Frail' was the debut single and received some airplay on Triple J and community radio. The video for 'Frail' was shot at the Sandringham Hotel, Newtown, Sydney, for a total cost of $100. Pollyanna recorded three live tracks for the Triple J Australian Music Show in January 1995, then played their first shows in Melbourne as well as supporting The Screaming Trees and The Jesus And Mary Chain in Sydney in early 1995.

Their second five-track EP, Junior, was picked up by Australian radio after its release in May 1995, with "Pale Grey Eyes" gaining high rotation on Triple J and community radio. Pollyanna started touring around Australia in support of Junior, including support slots with Sebadoh, Dick Dale and Teenage Fanclub. Junior (featuring 'Pale Grey Eyes') reached #1 on the National Alternative Singles Chart and stayed in the Top 20 for forty one weeks until March 1996. In July 1995, MTV America sent a film crew to Sydney and chose Pollyanna and Front End Loader as the two bands they wanted to feature live in a segment on Sydney night life. Jonathan Lewis of AllMusic described their early sound, "noisy indie guitar pop, reminiscent of Sugar or Happy Days-era Catherine Wheel."

In November 1995, "Lemonsuck" was released as the first single from the forthcoming debut album, again gaining high rotation on Triple J and also some airplay on commercial radio. 'Lemonsuck' reached #1 on the National Alternative Singles Chart, and stayed in the Top 20 for seventeen weeks, with the band receiving increasing nationwide attention in the media. In early November, Pollyanna played at the FBI Radio benefit concert at Hordern Pavilion in Sydney on a bill that included You Am I and Tumbleweed, then embarked on their first national headline tour, followed by another national tour in December, supporting American band Paw.

Australian musicologist, Ian McFarlane, noticed that both Junior and Lemonsuck had, "reached #1 on the national alternative charts, with tracks like "Pale Grey Eyes" and "Lemonsuck" becoming live favourites."

=== 1996–2002: Studio albums to break up ===
Pollyanna's highly anticipated debut album, Long Player, was released in March 1996, peaking at #31 on the ARIA National Albums Chart. Recorded in eight days at Sydney's Paradise Studios with David Trump, the album received mostly positive reviews for its guitar-driven pop, with fourteen tracks, clocking in at just under one hour. "Lemonsuck" and "Pale Grey Eyes" were voted onto the 1995 Triple J Hottest 100. Handley explained in a 2023 interview that the lyrics to 'Lemonsuck' are gobbedygook. "I was trying to write a big, bouncy pop song and I tried to incorporate all the elements of other songs that I loved from other artists I was into like Matthew Sweet."

Pollyanna featured on the second episode of Recovery, recorded a Triple J Live At The Wireless set in May 1996 and were guest programmers on Rage in August 1996. Long Player received nominations for Breakthrough Artist – Album and Best Alternative Release at the ARIA Music Awards of 1996.

Pollyanna re-released their two early EPs, remixed and compiled onto one disc, Junior Rock, in November 1996. Lewis rated it at four stars and explained, "[they are] able to inject a lot more variety into their guitar-driven pop songs, with 'Grover Washington', 'Truck' and 'Cows Crossing' being among the best on the album. These tracks showed that Pollyanna were able to write great songs without bludgeoning the listener with their guitars." They toured nationally supporting Powderfinger. At this time, DeSoto Records released a 7" double-A sided single, 'Fordgreensilverocket' / 'Grover Washington', in the United States.

Pollyanna toured heavily through 1996 and 1997, including several headline tours, national tours with Hoodoo Gurus, Custard, Ammonia and support slots for the Australian leg of separate world tours by Weezer, the Cranberries and Garbage. They appeared at the 1996 Big Day Out, 1996 Homebake, 1996 Falls Festival, and 1996 Livid festival.

From left to right: Maynard, Stapleton and Handley in Melbourne, 1999

The first single, "Effervescence", from the forthcoming second album, Hello Halo, was released in April 1997. Work began on their second album, Hello Halo, in early 1997 at Festival Studios in Sydney with producer, Paul McKercher. With the album almost finished, Luca left the band amicably in May 1997, later joining Drop City in 1998. Glenn Maynard, who had played drums in Melbourne-based bands, Have A Nice Day and Violetine, joined on drums, and recorded two tracks, 'Peachy Keen' and 'Cinnamon Lip' with the band. Pollyanna then shifted base from Sydney to Melbourne. Hello Halo was released in September 1997, again to positive reviews. Moody tracks like 'Brittle Then Broken', 'Velocette' and 'Cooling Your Heels' confirmed that Pollyanna were capable of writing more than just straightforward guitar rock. Strings, horns, keyboards and orchestral percussion were used on several tracks as the band sought to expand their sound. A heavy touring schedule ensued, including being part of the new-look 1998 Homebake Festival, which played in Melbourne, Sydney and the Gold Coast. Several more appearances on national TV further increased their exposure. 'Cinnamon Lip' was voted #69 on the 1998 Triple J Hottest 100.

For Pollyanna's third studio album, Delta City Skies, the band headed to the United States in October 1998 to record at Ardent Studios in Memphis, Tennessee with producer Brian Paulson (Something for Kate, Jayhawks, Wilco, Beck), and then spent a month playing shows across the US. 'Hermit Inertia' and 'Feeding Circle' were released as singles. The album had a more wide-screen sound than its predecessors and many tracks featured organ, leading to the addition of a keyboard player, Adrian Whitehead, to the touring band. There was further touring in Australia, including a national tour with Ben Folds Five, plus a slot on the 1999 Falls Festival.,

In mid-2000 Stapleton left Australia briefly to live in the United States with her partner in Chapel Hill, North Carolina. By July of that year the band had been dropped by their label, Mushroom Records, and their drummer, Maynard, had left. Handley performed solo shows, Jasper Lee of Oz Music Project describing his set list, "a combination of new and old stuff, the acoustic versions of faves including 'Cinnamon Lip', 'Vanilla Coated Salesmen' and 'Home is Where My Heart Sank'."

The group's fourth and final studio album, Didn't Feel a Thing was recorded in the United States with Paulson producing again, this time at Sound of Music Studios in Richmond, Virginia. Pollyanna were recording as a duo where Handley played most of the parts on the album, including drums, with Stapleton contributing bass guitar. Shock Records released it via its Longshot sub-label. A new-look four-piece band hit the road: Stapleton had returned from the US to resume bass guitar duties alongside Handley and they were joined by Andy Strachan on drums and Adrian Whitehead on keyboards (ex-the Trims). Oz Music Project's Nick Copack observed, "it represents nothing new, nothing Pollyanna fans haven't heard before. But that doesn't matter, because Pollyanna do what they do extremely well... They never drown their songs in unnecessary effects or repeat choruses merely to fill in time. What needs to be played or sung is done so, and the rest is left out. It's a simple formula, but one not enough bands adhere to."

Touring members between 1999 and 2002 included, Sam Holloway (ex-Cordrazine) on keyboards, Shaun Lohoar (ex-Saidaside) on drums and Richard Coneliano (ex-Bluebottle Kiss) on drums.

In 2002 Pollyanna split up, Handley later reminisced, "While on tour for Didn't Feel a Thing, Andy (our drummer) was asked to join the Living End, and our bass player Rayke was about to have a baby. It felt like the wheels were falling off the band so I thought it was probably high time for a break."

== Afterwards ==
Matt Handley released a solo album in 2005, Won't Get Over You, licensed through Inertia Records and toured briefly with a new backing band, The Dagger Stares, as well as performing solo shows to support its release. Stapleton was briefly a member of The Dagger Stares on bass guitar, "in-between her mothering commitments!", Adam Friedman was on keyboards and Ant Milne was on drums and backing vocals. Handley has since worked as a guitar technician for Tame Impala, Augie March, The Waifs, Pond and the Living End.

== Discography ==
=== Studio albums ===
List of albums, with selected details and chart positions
Title	Album details	Peak chart positions
Title	Album details	AUS
Long Player	Released: March 1996; Label: Bark/ Mushroom (D 24565); Format: CD	31
Hello Halo	Released: September 1997; Label: Mushroom (MUSH33043 2); Format: CD	72
Delta City Skies	Released: May 1999; Format: CD; Label: Mushroom (MUSH33219 2)	56
Didn't Feel a Thing	Released: 2000; Label: Longshot (XHBT0010); Format: CD	—

=== Compilation albums ===
List of compilation albums, with selected details
Title	Album details
Junior Rock	Released: November 1996; Label: Bark (GRRR124); Format: CD

=== Extended plays ===
List of EPs, with selected details
Title	EP details
Fordgreensilverocket	Released: October 1994; Label: Bark (GRRR102); Format: CD
Junior	Released: May 1995; Label: Bark (GRRR106); Format: CD
Lemonsuck	Released: October 1995; Label: Bark (GRRR109); Format: CD

=== Singles ===
List of singles, with selected chart positions
Year	Title	Peak chart positions	Album
Year	Title	AUS	Album
1995	"Pale Grey Eyes"	radio only	Junior
1995	"Lemonsuck"	93	Lemonsuck & Long Player
1996	"Piston"	—	Long Player
1996	"Keep Me Guessing"	—	Long Player
1996	"Potomac"	—	Long Player
1997	"Effervescence"	—	Hello Halo
1997	"Peachy Keen"	—	Hello Halo
1998	"Brittle Then Broken"	95	Hello Halo
1999	"Hermit Inertia"	—	Delta City Skies
1999	"Feeding Circle"	—	Delta City Skies
2001	"Rebound Girl"	—	Didn't Feel a Thing

== Awards and nominations ==
=== ARIA Music Awards ===
The ARIA Music Awards is an annual awards ceremony that recognises excellence, innovation, and achievement across all genres of Australian music. They commenced in 1987.

Year	Nominee / work	Award	Result	Ref.
1996	Long Player	Breakthrough Artist - Album	Nominated	
1996	Long Player	Best Adult Alternative Album	Nominated	
