= Pornosonic =

PornoSonic

Studio album by PornoSonic
- Released: 1999
- Genre: Funk, Porn groove
- Producer: Don Argott

PornoSonic chronology
PornoSonic (1999)	Cream Streets (2000)

Pornosonic is a project by Don Argott inspired by the style of music in adult films. Two albums have been released.

== Concept ==
The albums claim to be soundtracks from non-existent unreleased porn movies, but they are modern creations. Famous adult film actor Ron Jeremy was to hired by Mini Mace Pro Records to perform voice overs.

Reissued in 2000 and 2004.

== Unreleased 70s Porno Music ==
=== Track listing ===
1. Dick Dagger's Theme From Dick Dagger's Big Dick Dilemma
2. Cramming for College From Cramming for College
3. Nice n' Sleazy Does It From "If It Ain't Easy It Ain't Sleazy"
4. Spiderpussy From Spiderpussy
5. Special Delivery From A Happy Ass
6. Sex Starved Secretaries From Takin' Dictation
7. Prepare for Take Off From Mile High Club
8. Her Magic Carpet From Donna Does DeNise
9. Laying Pipe From Plumber's DeLight
10. Spiderpussy (Slight Return) From Spiderpussy 2: Caught in the Web

=== Personnel ===
- D. Mason Bendewald — backing vocals
- Laura Shepherd — backing vocals
- Jarred Alterman — bass, piano (clavinova)
- Rob Giglio — drums
- Benjamin Shwartz — flute
- Don Argott — guitar
- Mike Viggiani — guitar
- Nancy Falcow — lead vocals (track 10)
- Dan McKinney — organ
- Nick Kendall — percussion, violin
- Daniel Lee — trumpet
- Jo Hewitt — vocals

== Cream Streets ==
=== Track listing ===
1. Dream Streets (Theme)
2. Peach Fuzz
3. Dick Goes Down
4. Dirty Pimp (Cum Lin's Theme)
5. Putana Rodriguez
6. Deep Inside Peach
7. Get Peach Fuzz
8. Peach Pie
9. In the Way of Dick
10. Dreaming of Dick
11. Dick Creeps In
12. Dick Saves Peach
13. Cream Streets (Outro)
14. Dick Dagger's Theme ('76 Remix)
15. Cream Streets (Trailer)

=== Personnel ===
- Don Argott — composer, cover design, guitar, primary artist, producer, talk box
- D. Mason Bendewald — producer
- Billy Blaise — saxophone
- Mark Brodzik — cover painting
- Mike Comstock — engineer, mixing
- Rob Giglio — drums
- Nick Kendall — percussion
- Joey Kilrain — logo design
- Jesse Kramer — drums
- Israel Longg - bass
- Dan McKinney — organ (Hammond), electric piano, synthesizer
- Dave Smith — flute

== Reception ==
Hal Horowitz from AllMusic valued it as "an enjoyable disc to play spot the influences with", and described it as "expertly played, engaging music that succeeds in spite of its nudge-wink approach". CMJ New Music Report described it as an "elaborate fake".
