= Black Fingernails, Red Wine (song) =

2006 single by Eskimo Joe

Single by Eskimo Joe

from the album Black Fingernails, Red Wine
- Released: 15 May 2006
- Studio: The Grove
- Length: 4:09
- Label: Warner; Mushroom
- Songwriters: Kavyen Temperley; Stuart MacLeod; Joel Quartermain
- Producer: Eskimo Joe

Eskimo Joe singles chronology
"Older Than You" (2004)	"Black Fingernails, Red Wine" (2006)	"Sarah" (2006)

"Black Fingernails, Red Wine" is a song by Australian alternative rock band Eskimo Joe, released in May 2006 as the lead single their third studio album, Black Fingernails, Red Wine. The song became their first to peak inside the Australian Singles Chart top 10, peaking at number six. At the ARIA Music Awards of 2006, the song won Single of the Year and was ranked number two on the Triple J Hottest 100 of 2006, and in 2025 placed 78 on the Triple J Hottest 100 of Australian Songs. the At the 2007 West Australian Music Industry Awards, the song won Most Popular Single/EP.

== Music videos ==
Two music videos were made for this song. One showed the band members in a car, kidnapping people in the middle of the night. At the end of the video, the kidnapped people were revealed to be Eskimo Joe themselves. When Kavyen Temperley was a guest on The Glass House, he offered that this symbolised that Eskimo Joe had changed, and the kidnapped band were the old Eskimo Joe. The second video shows the band playing in an old building. Due to the criminal theme of the first video, it received an MA15+ classification in Australia, restricting it to night-time airplay. The second promo clip was made to enable the song to be played by daytime music shows.

== Track listings ==
All tracks are written by Eskimo Joe.

CD single
No.	Title	Length
1.	"Black Fingernails, Red Wine"	4:05
2.	"Japanese Waitress"	2:58
3.	"Don't Get Me Wrong"	4:48
4.	"From the Sea" (performed live on Rove Live on 8 June 2004)	3:25

Limited-edition CD single
No.	Title	Length
1.	"Black Fingernails, Red Wine"	4:05
2.	"Trying to Sleep"	2:56
3.	Untitled (CDROM feature: Create Your Own Ringtone)

7-inch single
No.	Title	Length
1.	"Black Fingernails, Red Wine"	4:05
2.	"Trying to Sleep"	2:56

== Charts ==
=== Weekly charts ===
Chart (2006)	Peak position
Australia (ARIA)	6
New Zealand (Recorded Music NZ)	13

=== Year-end charts ===
Chart (2006)	Rank
Australia (ARIA)	18

== Certifications ==
Region	Certification	Certified units/sales
Australia (ARIA)	Platinum	70,000^{^}
^{^} Shipments figures based on certification alone.

== Release history ==
Region	Date	Format(s)	Label(s)	Catalogue	Ref.
Australia	15 May 2006	CD	Warner; Mushroom	5101137632	
Australia	June 2006	7-inch vinyl	Warner; Mushroom	5101137630	
Australia	7 September 2006	Limited-edition CD	Warner; Mushroom	5101138732	
