= Josh Pyke discography =

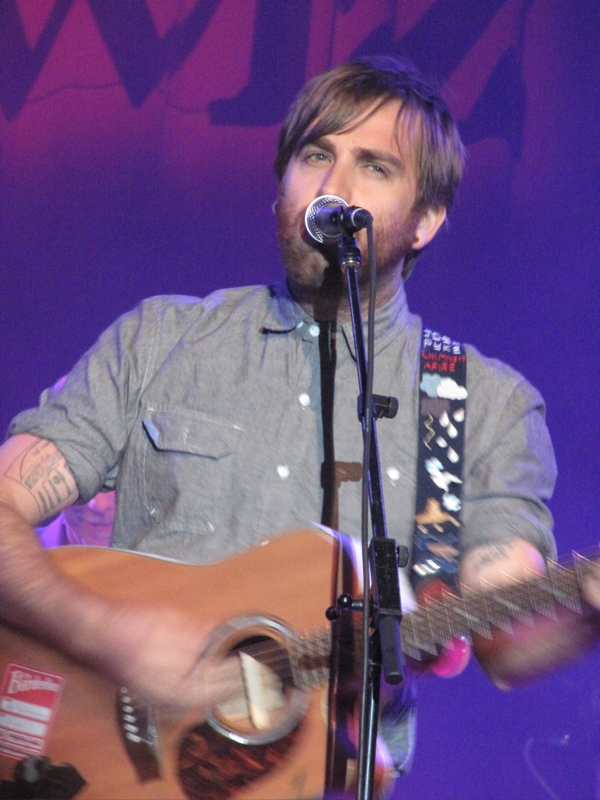
- Studio albums: 8
- EPs: 7
- Live albums: 2
- Compilation albums: 2
- Singles: 46

The discography of Josh Pyke, an Australian singer-songwriter, consists of eight studio albums, seven extended plays, and forty-six singles.

His eighth studio album, Kingdom Within, was released in June 2026.

== Studio albums ==
Title	Album details	Peak chart positions	Certifications
Title	Album details	AUS	Certifications
Memories & Dust	Released: 10 March 2007; Label: Ivy League; Formats: CD, LP, digital download	4	ARIA: Platinum
Chimney's Afire	Released: 4 October 2008; Label: Ivy League; Formats: CD, digital download	3	ARIA: Gold
Only Sparrows	Released: 19 August 2011; Label: Ivy League; Formats: CD, digital download	4	
The Beginning and the End of Everything	Released: 2013; Label: Ivy League; Formats: CD, LP, digital download	7	
But for All These Shrinking Hearts	Released: 31 July 2015; Label: Wonderlick / Sony Music Australia; Formats: CD, LP, digital download, streaming	2	
Rome	Released: 28 August 2020; Label: Wonderlick / Sony Music Australia; Formats: CD, LP, digital download, streaming	8	
To Find Happiness	Released: 18 March 2022; Label: Wonderlick / Sony Music Australia; Formats: CD, LP, digital download, streaming	17	
Kingdom Within	Released: 12 June 2026; Label: Josh Pyke / ADA; Formats: CD, LP, digital download, streaming	6	

== Live albums ==
Title	Album details	Peak chart positions
Title	Album details	AUS
Live at the Sydney Opera House (with the Sydney Symphony Orchestra)	Released: 1 July 2016; Label: ABC Music, Universal Music Australia; Format: CD, digital download	27
Josh Pyke Live with the Adelaide Symphony Orchestra (with the Adelaide Symphony Orchestra)	Released: 30 January 2026; Label: Josh Pyke, ADA; Format: digital download	—

== Compilation albums ==
Title	Album details	Peak chart positions
Title	Album details	AUS
Recordings 2003–2005	Released: 10 September 2005; Label: The Million/Ivy League; Formats: CD, digital download	—
The Best of Josh Pyke + B-Sides and Rarities	Released: 30 June 2017; Label: Ivy League; Format: CD, digital download	80

== Extended plays ==
Title	EP details	Peak chart positions
Title	EP details	AUS
Current Works Volume 1	Released: 1 January 2004; Label: The Million (Mill0401); Formats: CD, digital download	—
The Doldrums	Released: 1 November 2004; Label: The Million (Mill0410); Formats: CD, digital download	—
Feeding the Wolves	Released: 14 November 2005; Label: Ivy League; Formats: CD, digital download	64
Beaks of Crows	Released: 10 July 2007; Label: Ivy League; Formats: CD, digital download	—
Revisions 2020	Released: 6 November 2020; Label: Josh Pyke, Wonderlust; Formats: CD, digital download, streaming	—
Missing Memories	Released: 19 February 2021; Label: Ivy League; Formats: digital download, streaming	—
It's Gonna Be a Great Great Day!	Released: 22 September 2023; Label: ABC Music; Formats: digital download, streaming	—
Covers	Released: 2 August 2024; Label: Josh Pyke / Ditto; Formats: digital download, streaming	—

== Singles ==
=== As lead artist ===
List of singles as lead artist, with year released, selected chart positions and certifications, and album name shown
Title	Year	Peak chart positions	Certification	Album
Title	Year	AUS	Certification	Album
Credited as Night Hour
"Kids Don't Sell Their Hopes So Fast"	2003	—		Current Works Volume 1
"The Doldrums"	2004	—		The Doldrums
Credited as Josh Pyke
"Middle of the Hill"	2005	—		Feeding the Wolves
"Private Education"	2006	—		Feeding the Wolves
"Memories & Dust"	2006	39		Memories & Dust
"Lines on Palms"	2007	33		Memories & Dust
"Fed & Watered"	2007	—		Memories & Dust
"Forever Song"	2007	—		Memories & Dust
"Sew My Name"	2007	—		Memories & Dust
"The Lighthouse Song"	2008	76		Chimney's Afire
"Make You Happy"	2008	125		Chimney's Afire
"The Summer"	2009	177	ARIA: Gold	Chimney's Afire
"No One Wants a Lover"	2011	139		Only Sparrows
"World Is a Picture"	2011	—		Only Sparrows
"Pressed Against You in the Crowd"	2012	—		
"Leeward Side"	2013	119		The Beginning and the End of Everything
"Warm in Winter"	2013	—		The Beginning and the End of Everything
"Hollering Hearts"	2015	—		But for All These Shrinking Hearts
"Be Your Boy"	2016	—		But for All These Shrinking Hearts
"Words Make the World Go Round" (with Justine Clarke)	2016	—		Non-album single
"Into the Wind"	2017	—		The Best of Josh Pyke
"I Don't Know"	2020	—		Rome
"Doubting Things"	2020	—		Rome
"Home"	2020	—		Rome
"Don't Let It Wait"	2020	—		Rome
"You're My Colour"	2020	—		Rome
"I Thought We Were a River"	2020	—		Rome
"Middle of the Hill (acoustic)"	2020	—		Revisions 2020
"To Find Happiness"	2021	—		To Find Happiness
"The Hummingbird" (with Gordi)	2021	—		To Find Happiness
"Your Heart Won't Always Weigh a Tonne"	2021	—		To Find Happiness
"Circle of Light"	2021	—		To Find Happiness
"If You Don't Know Me, Who Am I"	2022	—		To Find Happiness
"Little River Runs" (with Tiptoe Giants)	2023	—		Non-album singles
"Champion" (with Lenka)	2023	—		Non-album singles
"Blackbird"	2023	—		Covers
"As It Was"	2024	—		Covers
"New Slang"	2024	—		Covers
"Closing Time"	2024	—		Covers
"Kingdom Within"	2026	—		Kingdom Within
"Under the Escarpment"	2026	—		Kingdom Within
"You're Doing Better Than You Think You Are"	2026	—		Kingdom Within
"Won't Be Heavy" (featuring Missy Higgins)	2026	—		Kingdom Within
"Fair Game" (redux)	2026	—		
"—" denotes releases that did not chart.

=== As featured artist ===
List of singles as featured artist, with year released, selected chart positions, and album name shown
Title	Year	Peak chart positions	Album
Title	Year	AUS	Album
"Throw It Away" (360 featuring Josh Pyke)	2011	79	Falling & Flying
"Someone Else's House" (Urthboy featuring Josh Pyke)	2014	—	Non-album singles
"F U Cancer" (Catherine Britt featuring Kasey Chambers, Beccy Cole, Lyn Bowtell, Wes Carr and Wendy Matthews)	2016	—	Non-album singles
"Hide Away" (Modern Living featuring Josh Pyke)	2024	—	TBA
"Sabotage!" (Dobby featuring Josh Pyke)	2026	—	Marshmallow
"—" denotes releases that did not chart or were not released.

=== Songwriting credits ===
List of songwriting credits, with year released, artist name, and album shown
Title	Year	Artist	Album
"When We Get There"	2010	Edurne	Nueva Piel
"Siempre Sale El Sol"	2010	Edurne	Nueva Piel
"Cotton Wool"	2010	Katie Noonan and the Captains	Emperor's Box
"The Joneses"	2014	Jack Carty	Esk
"What They Don't Tell You"	2017	Rachael Leahcar	Shadows
"A Banana Is a Banana" "These Are Some Things That Are True"	2017	Justine Clarke	Ta Da!
"Drive"	2020	Aodhan	Non-album single
"Everything You Wanted"	2021	Bryan Estepa	Back to The Middle
"Do I Make You Crazy"	2022	Bryan Estepa	Wake to a Bright Morning
