= The Best of Josh Pyke =

Greatest hits album by Josh Pyke
- Released: 30 June 2017
- Label: Ivy League Records

Josh Pyke chronology
Live at the Sydney Opera House (2016)	The Best of Josh Pyke (2017)	Rome (2020)

Singles from The Best of Josh Pyke
- 1. "Into the Wind" Released: May 2017

The Best of Josh Pyke (subtitled + B-Sides & Rarities) is the first greatest hits album by Australian musician, Josh Pyke. It was released on 30 June 2017 by Ivy League Records and it peaked at number 80 on the ARIA Charts.

The album arrives 10 years after the release of his debut studio album, Memories & Dust, and features singles, personal picks and rare tracks along with two brand new songs. Pyke said "When I look back, I can see similar threads across my albums. There's a really strong theme about the passing of time, and how past experiences manifest themselves at different points in your life."

The album was supported with an Australian tour across July and August 2017. The album artwork is by illustrator James Hancock, the artist responsible for many of Pyke's early album art. Pyke said "As soon as I decided to do the Best Of, it felt natural to get James to do the art. We went to high school together, and have witnessed each other forge successful careers in the arts, so it was lovely to take that full circle for this album."

== Track listing ==
The Best of
No.	Title	taken from	Length
1.	"Kids Don't Sell Their Hopes So Fast" (as Night Hour)	2004 Current Works, Volume 1	3:16
2.	"Beg Your Pardon"	2006 single; 2007 Memories & Dust	2:32
3.	"Middle of the Hill"	2005 Feeding the Wolves EP; 2006 single; 2007 Memories & Dust	2:36
4.	"Private Education"	2005 Feeding the Wolves EP; 2006 single; 2007 Memories & Dust	3:22
5.	"Lines on Palms"	2007 single; 2007 Memories & Dust	3:02
6.	"Memories & Dust"	2006 single; 2007 Memories & Dust	3:04
7.	"Forever Song"	2007 Memories & Dust	2:50
8.	"Fed and Watered"	2006 Middle of the Hill vinyl single; 2007 single; 2007 Memories & Dust	3:50
9.	"The Lighthouse Song"	2008 Chimney's Afire	3:44
10.	"Make You Happy"	2008 Chimney's Afire	2:57
11.	"The Summer"	2008 Chimney's Afire	3:22
12.	"No One Wants a Lover"	2011 single; 2011 Only Sparrows	3:20
13.	"New Year's Song"	2008 Chimney's Afire	3:47
14.	"The World is a Picture"	2011 Only Sparrows	3:31
15.	"Particles"	2011 Only Sparrows	4:10
16.	"Leeward Side"	2013 The Beginning and the End of Everything	2:46
17.	"The Beginning and the End of Everything"	2013 The Beginning and the End of Everything	3:49
18.	"Bug Eyed Beauty"	2013 The Beginning and the End of Everything	1:44
19.	"There's a Line"	2015 But for All These Shrinking Hearts	3:35
20.	"Hollering Hearts"	2015 But for All These Shrinking Hearts	3:21
21.	"Songlines"	2015 But for All These Shrinking Hearts	3:46

B Sides & Rarities
No.	Title	taken from	Length
1.	"Into the Wind"	2017 single	3:26
2.	"Save Your Love"		4:08
3.	"Cosy Catastrophe"		4:04
4.	"1,2,3"		3:38
5.	"Confessions for You"		3:04
6.	"The Doldrums" (as Night Hour)	2004 single	3:57
7.	"Don't Bury Me When I Die"		4:03
8.	"Music from Another Room"		3:58
9.	"Sleepers to Steel"	2007 Lines on Palms single	2:51
10.	"Coles Lane Crossing"		6:37
11.	"Clock On / Clock Off"	2006 Memories & Dust single	5:14
12.	"Maths & Magic (Demo)" (as Night Hour)	2004 The Doldrums single	3:56
13.	"Best Man (At Your First Loves Wedding)"		4:58
14.	"Chemistry Sold" (as Night Hour)	2004 Current Works, Volume 1	3:34
15.	"Loaded Questions"		4:08
16.	"You're the End My Friend"		2:36
17.	"Gasoline" (as Night Hour)	2004 The Doldrums single	3:06
18.	"Backward Ghost of Me"		4:08
19.	"Note to Self"		2:02

- Current Works, volume 1 (2004) and The Doldrums single/EP (2004) (released by 'Night Hour') were re-issued in 2005 as Recordings 2003–2005

== Charts ==
Chart (2017)	Position
Australia (ARIA)	80

== Release history ==
Region	Date	Format	Label	Catalogue
Australia	30 June 2017	2xCD; digital download; streaming	Ivy League Records	IVY367
