= Revisions 2020 =

EP by Josh Pyke
- Released: 6 November 2020
- Label: Josh Pyke, Wonderlick, Sony

Josh Pyke chronology
Rome (2020)	Revisions 2020 (2020)	To Find Happiness (2022)

Singles from Rome
- 1. "Middle of the Hill" Released: 6 November 2020

Revisions 2020 is the fifth EP by Australian singer-songwriter Josh Pyke. It was released on 6 November 2020. The EP featured reimagined versions of songs from throughout Pyke's career. The EP including a previously unreleased piano version of his debut solo single "Middle of the Hill", which Pyke has dedicated to his mother, who is battling Alzheimer's. Pyke Siad "'Middle of the Hill' has always been a reminder for me to appreciate the good things when they're there. Over the past few years this idea has been especially important as I've watched my dear mum suffer through the ravages Alzheimer's disease. It's been a really rough time for me and my family, as we try to come to terms with what feels like the loss of a loved one, although she is still physically with us."

== Track listing ==
No.	Title	Length
1.	"Middle of the Hill" (acoustic)	3:16
2.	"Memories & Dust" (acoustic, featuring Elana Stone)	3:54
3.	"The Summer" (acoustic, featuring Elana Stone)	3:29
4.	"Endless Summer" (acoustic, featuring Elana Stone)	3:36
5.	"Doubling Thomas" (acoustic)	3:50
