= J Awards of 2007 =

Annual music award presented by Triple J

- Date: 7 December 2007
- Venue: Australia
- Website: abc.net.au/triplej

The J Award of 2007 is the third annual J Awards, established by the Australian Broadcasting Corporation's youth-focused radio station Triple J. The announcement comes at the culmination of Ausmusic Month (November). In 2007, a new award for Unearthed Artist of the Year was added to the award for Australian Album of the Year.

== Who's eligible? ==
Any Australian album released independently or through a record company, or sent to Triple J in consideration for airplay, is eligible for the J Award. The 2007 nominations for Australian Album of the Year were selected from albums received by Triple J between December 2006 and November 2007. For Unearthed Artist of the Year it was open to any artist from the Unearthed (talent contest), who has had a ground breaking and impactful 12 months from November 2006 and October 2007

== Judging Panel ==
The J Award judging panel is headed by Triple J's Music Director Richard Kingsmill. The panel includes Caroline Tran from Triple J's flagship Australian music program Home and Hosed and other Triple J presenters, producers and live music engineers.

== Awards ==
=== Australian Album of the Year ===
Artist	Album Title	Result
The Panics	Cruel Guards	Won
The John Butler Trio	Grand National	Nominated
Josh Pyke	Memories & Dust	Nominated
Silverchair	Young Modern	Nominated
The Vasco Era	Oh We Do Like To Be Beside The Seaside	Nominated
Architecture in Helsinki	Places Like This	Nominated
British India	Guillotine	Nominated
Midnight Juggernauts	Dystopia	Nominated
Katalyst	What's Happening	Nominated
Urthboy	The Signal	Nominated
Grinspoon	Alibis & Other Lies	Nominated
Bumblebeez	Prince Umberto and the Sister of Ill	Nominated
Pnau	Pnau	Nominated

=== Unearthed Artist of the Year ===
Artist	Notes	Result
Young and Restless	From Canberra who won the 2006 Homebake Festival. They have since toured across the country with the Erase Errata (USK), Cansei de Ser Sexy (Brazil) and Love Is All (Sweden). They have also signed with local independent label, Dot Dash Recordings, releasing their self-titled debut album in mid-July, 2007, then embarking on a successful headline tour of their own.	Won
Cuthbert and the Nightwalkers	From New South Wales who won the 2007 The Great Escape, who have subsequently supported Kate Miller-Heidke, Old Man River and The Paper Scissors. The band released their debut album Love Needs Us on the Warner Music label.	Nominated
Illzilla	Hip Hop artists who won the 2006 Falls Festival and then played at the Pyramid Rock Festival. They have also supported acts such as Astronomy Class and played at the finals of the DMC Championships.	Nominated
Institut Polaire	Western Australia's who won the Perth Big Day Out. They have since signed to Sydney's Popfrenzy Records releasing their first EP The Fauna and the Flora. They have toured twice nationally in the past year, supporting international acts The Clientele (UK), Camera Obscura (UK), and WA tour supports with New Buffalo.	Nominated
Leroy Lee	From New South Wales who won the support slot for NSW leg of Missy Higgins' national tour.	Nominated
