= Freeway (disambiguation) =

A freeway is a common name for different types of limited-access highways.

Freeway or Free Way may also refer to:

== Highways ==
- Controlled-access highway
  - mostly in the form of divided highways
- Two-lane expressway, sometimes called a "two lane freeway"

== Film, TV and entertainment ==
- Freeway (1988 film), a thriller starring Darlanne Fluegel and James Russo
- Freeway (1996 film), a crime film starring Kiefer Sutherland and Reese Witherspoon
- Freeway (video game), a 1981 game for the Atari 2600
- Freeways (video game), a 2017 game on Steam and mobile
- Freeway, a family pet dog in the 1980s TV series Hart to Hart

== Music ==
- Freeway (band), a Dutch rock band
- Freeway (rapper) (born 1978), American rapper
- Freeway, a UK rock band featuring Terry Slesser

=== Albums ===
- Freeway (album), a 2003 album by Smash!!
- Freeways (album), a 1977 album by Bachman–Turner Overdrive
- Freeways (EP), a 1985 EP by Men Without Hats
- Freeway (EP), a 2013 EP by Flux Pavilion

=== Songs ===
- "Free Way", a 2006 song by Rain
- "Freeway" (song), a 1952 song by Chet Baker recorded with the Gerry Mulligan Quartet
- "Freeway", a song by Aimee Mann from Smilers
- "Freeway", a song by Kurt Vile from Constant Hitmaker
- "Freeway", a song by the Soup Dragons from Hydrophonic
- "Freeway", a song by Squarepusher from Selection Sixteen
- "Freeway", a song by TV on the Radio from OK Calculator

== Other uses ==
- "Freeway" Rick Ross (born 1960), American author and convicted drug trafficker
- Freeway (software), a web design application for Mac OS X
- Freeway Airport, Mitchellville, Maryland, U.S.
- Freeway Park, Seattle, Washington, U.S.
- Freeway, drink company from Germany

== See also ==
- Northeast Freeway (disambiguation)
- Southeast Freeway (disambiguation)
