= The Great Escape (festival) =

- Genre: Rock, hip hop, electronic
- Dates: Easter 2006–07
- Location: Sydney
- Years active: 2006–2007
- Website: thegreatescape.net.au

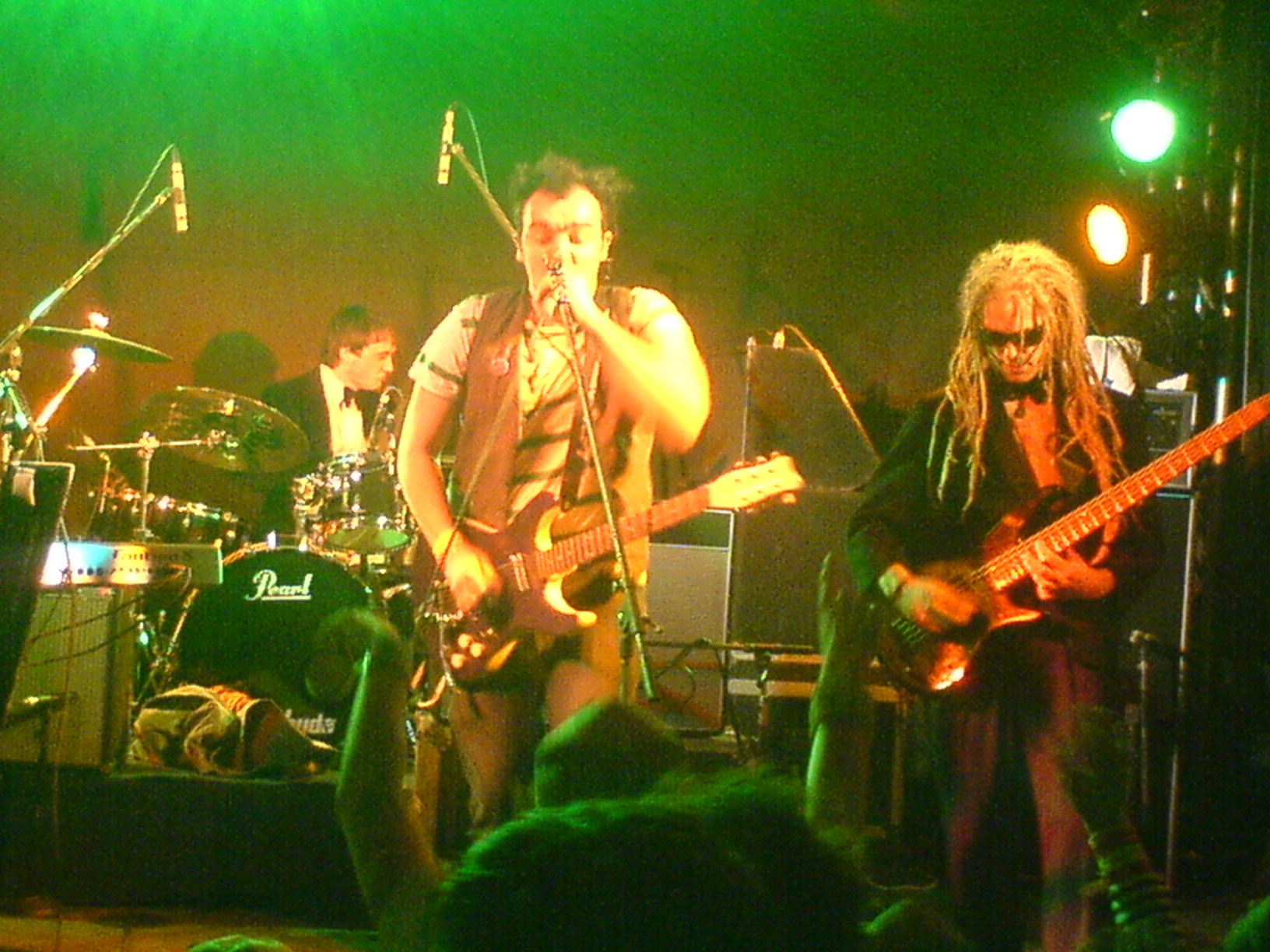
Andy Clockwise performs at the 2006 event

Some of the old munitions are on display during the event

Something for Kate's Pip Branson & Paul Dempsey

Combat Wombat take to the Big Top stage

Included at the event is a large mural created by patrons over the weekend

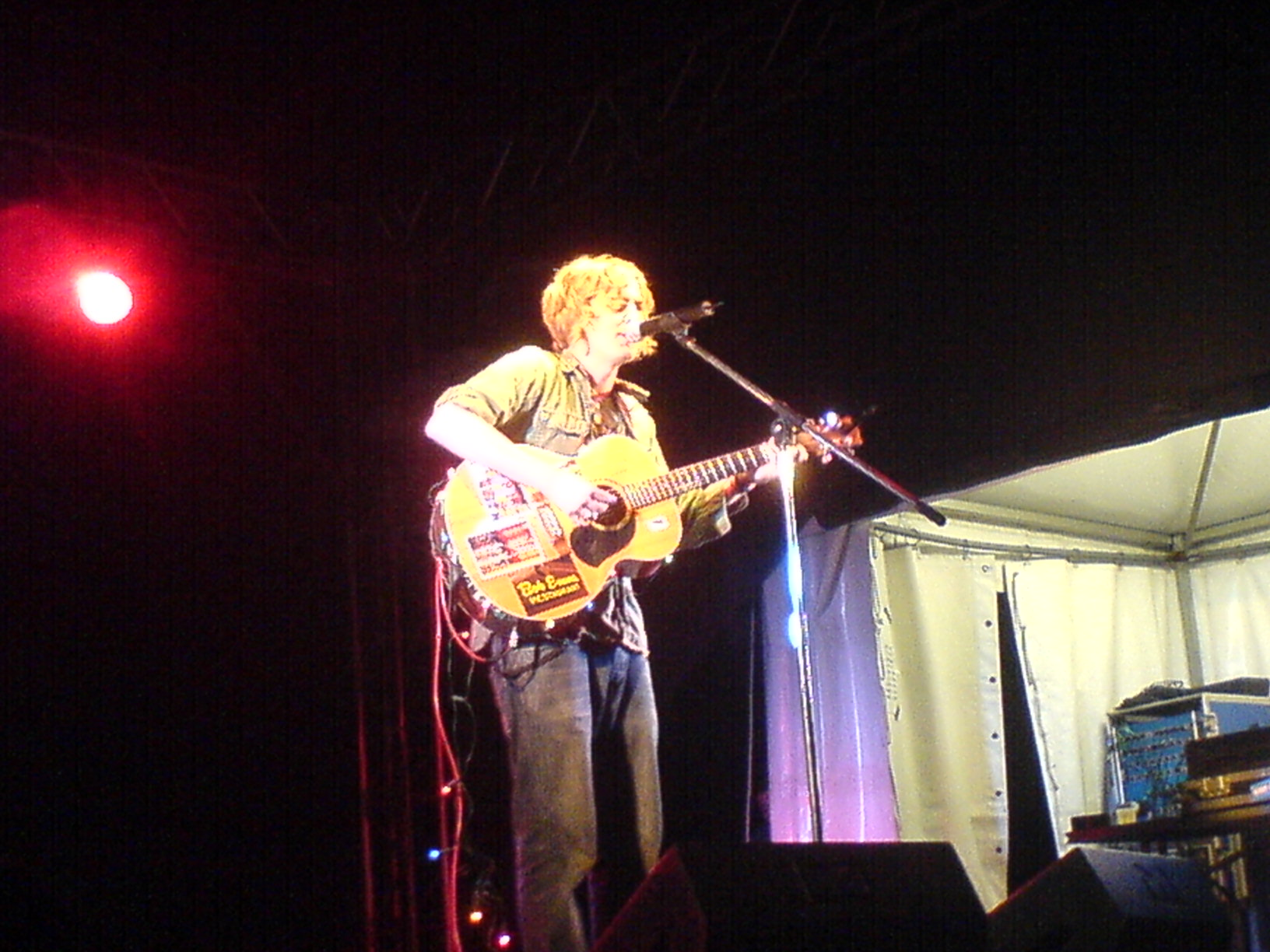
Bob Evans at the Riverside Stage

The Great Escape was a music festival held at Newington Armory, located within Sydney Olympic Park that took place in 2006 and 2007. Initially held over the Easter long weekend for the first two events, in 2008 it was announced the festival would take place on the Labour Day weekend, however the event was cancelled 2 months from the date due to poor ticket sales . It evolved from the 2005 Cockatoo Island Music Festival. The music and other attractions run over three full days (Good Friday to Easter Sunday in 2006–07), with some patrons camping from Thursday evening to Monday morning. Punters could attend either for the full weekend camping, purchase a 3-day pass and commute each day or attend a single day. Many acts also played the East Coast Blues & Roots Music Festival the same weekend, however The Great Escape line-up is more diverse featuring pop, hip hop, electronic and rock acts that would not fit into a Blues and Roots line-up. In addition to musical acts, there is also a wide range of other features such as comedy acts, bingo and trivia, conspiracy theory talks and yoga. There is no immediate future for the Great Escape at this point, but organisers are confident it will be resurrected in the near future.

== Artist lineups ==
Friday 14 April 2006

The Village Green	The Grove	Riverside	Big Top	The Tin Shed, Bunker 8 Cabaret, Ping Pong Club
Sigur Rós; Silverchair; Something for Kate; The Beautiful Girls; Wolf & Cub; Slightly Stoopid	Afro Moses; Waiting For Guinness; Blue King Brown; Mia Dyson; Hawksley Workman; Dave Graney & Clare Moore; Hat Fitz; Tim Ireland; Melanie Horsnell	Stephen Cummings; Martha Wainwright; The Darling Downs; Dobacoracol; Arabesk; Declan Kelly; Freeway; Angus and Julia Stone; Sam Shinazzi	The Herd; DJ Skoob; TZU; Koolism; Def Wish Cast; DJ Prince V; Hermitude; Combat Wombat; Local Knowledge; The Fumes; The Camels	Leanne Paris Band; Botanics; The Pedestrians; DJ Jack Shit; Uncle Ho; Toydeath; Layer; The Zion Band; The Hauntingly Beautiful Mousemoon; Garry Who; Gary Bradbury; Bruce Griffiths; Mickey Gee; The Red Paintings; The Dawn Collective; Joel Plaskett; Pony Club massacre

Saturday 15 April 2006

The Village Green	The Grove	Riverside	Big Top	The Tin Shed, Bunker 8 Cabaret, Ping Pong Club
The Black Keys; Femi Kuti; Juan De Macro's Afro Cuban Allstars; Eskimo Joe; Daara J; Slightly Stoopid	Kid Confucius; Rastawookie; Entropic; Andy Clockwise; Liz Martin; Joel Plaskett; Jesse Younan; Watussi; Brain Campaeu	Hawksley Workman; Rodrigo Y Gabriela; The Girls From The Clouds; The Audreys; Blue King Brown; The Hauntingly Beautiful Mousemoon; Panda; Durbeyfield; Laura Imbruglia	Paul Mac; The Bird; The Red Eyes; Endorphin; Butterfingers; The Vasco Era; The McMenamins; Those Bloody Mckennas	Casual Projects; Johnny G & The E Types; Lordz of the Fly; DJ Jack Shit; Rica Tetas; Coda; Jackie Loeb; Jason Ryder; Mark My Words; Adam Moulds; Zombie Ghost Train; Mr Bamboo; Lucie Thorne; Fondula; The Afterset

Sunday 16 April 2006

The Village Green	The Grove	Riverside	Big Top	The Tin Shed, Bunker 8 Cabaret, Ping Pong Club
Donavon Frankenreiter; Bernard Fanning; Xavier Rudd; Lior; Clare Bowditch & The Feeding Set	Neville Staples' Specials; Cornerstone Roots; King Tide; Josh Pyke; Paul Greene; Perry Keyes; Lucie Thorne; Matt Englebrecht; The Paper Scissors; Nardo	Bob Evans; Joel Plaskett; Butterfly 9; Ash Grunwald; Jackie Orszacky; Andrew Morris; The Devoted Few; Brendan Welsh; Tecoma	Decoder Ring; The Mountain Goats; Expatriate; Hawksley Workman; Epicure; Old Man River; Wallspace; British India	The Van; Superheavyweights; True Live; DJ Jack Shit; Showa 44; Zombie Ghost Train; Bev Killick; Chris Radburn; Jonas Holt; Dave Jory; Holidays on Ice; The Sins; The Handsome Young Strangers; Ollo; Dane Tucquet

Friday 6 April 2007

The Village Green	Riverside	The Terrace	The Tin Shed	Bunker 8 Cabaret, T-Bar
Wolfmother; Hilltop Hoods; The Vines; Ben Kweller; Amos Lee	Waiting For Guinness; Blue King Brown; Rastawookie; Kaki King; Dan Kelly & The Alpha-Males; Damien Dempsey; Nibs Van Der Spuy	Fourplay; Angus & Julia Stone; The Sins; Holly Throsby; Joel Plaskett; Melanie Horsnell; Genevieve Maynard & The Tallboys	The Exploders; Expatriate; Deerhoof; The Mares; Iain Archer; Ooh La La; Wallspace; Bertie Blackman; Toydeath; Emergency! Emergency!	Vulgargrad; Spooky Men's Chorale; Aleks & The Ramps; Greta Gertler & The Extroverts; DJ Jack Shit; Regal; Frenzie; Trevor Parkee

Saturday 7 April 2007

The Village Green	Riverside	The Terrace	The Tin Shed	Bunker 8 Cabaret, T-Bar
John Butler Trio; Missy Higgins; Ziggy Marley; Little Birdy; Bob Evans	The Bird; Lee "Scratch" Perry; The Magic Numbers; Bliss N Eso; King Tide; The Flairz; Kaki King	Kaki King; Blue King Brown; Waiting For Guinness; Coda; Damien Dempsey; Joel Plaskett; Donna Hewitt + Julian Knowles	Astronomy Class; Macromantics; The Panda Band; Children Collide; Sparkadia; The Paper Scissors: Whiskey Go Gos; Wons Phreely; Cuthbert and the Nightwalkers	Vulgargrad; Spooky Men's Choral; Aleks & The Ramps; Greta Gertler & The Extroverts; DJ Jack Shit; Jamie Lloyd & Jim Polar; Somatik

Sunday 8 April 2007

The Village Green	Riverside	The Terrace	The Tin Shed	Bunker 8 Cabaret, T-Bar
The Roots; The Living End; Gomez; Fat Freddy's Drop; The Fumes; Ryan Shaw	Fishbone; Johnny G & The E Types; Flogging Molly; The Lemonheads; Lou Rhodes; Darren Hanlon; Tanzie	Alice Russell; Waiting For Guinness; Damien Dempsey; Carla Werner; The White Buffalo; Joel Plaskett	Stick Figures; True Live; The Cops; The Temper Trap; Operator Please; Hermitude; Bridezilla; Slingshot; Walrus	Vulgargrad; Spooky Men's Choral; Aleks & The Ramps; Greta Gertler & The Extroverts; DJ Jack Shit; TM Juke; DJ Fitchie; GSAN

Gogol Bordello were advertised to play but were forced to cancel their Australian tour when visa issues prevented some members entering the country. Johnny G & The E Types played in their allotted time.

2008 The announced 2008 event featured a line-up which included Supergrass, Black Francis, Paul Kelly, Conor Oberst & The Mystic Valley Band, Peter Combe, Ladytron, Faker & The Panics, but it was called off on 8 August, just days after single day passes were sold in addition to weekend passes.
