= Pyramid Rock Festival =

Annual rock music festival on Phillip Island, Australia

Coordinates: 38°31′23″S 145°13′10″E

The Pyramid Rock Festival
- Genre: Rock, hip hop
- Dates: 30 December – 1 January (held annually)
- Locations: Ventnor, Phillip Island, Victoria
- Years active: 2004–2012
- Founders: Angus Cameron, two cousins

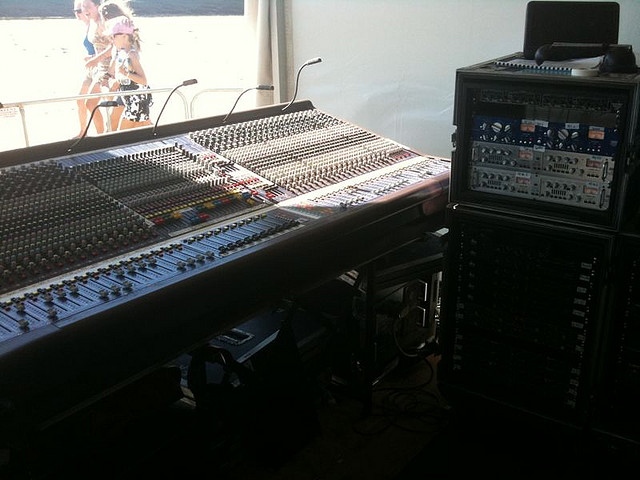
Pyramid Rock Festival 2009

The Pyramid Rock Festival was an Australian New Year's Eve camp-out rock music festival at Ventnor on Phillip Island. The original festival in 2004 was organised by local resident Angus Cameron and his two cousins.

== History ==
Beginning as a single day, from its second year it was run over two nights with two stages – the Main Stage, and the Pharaoh's Annex. The Main Stage hosted the major local and international acts, while the Pharaoh's Annex featured lesser-known local acts, and in the later evening, the more dance-oriented acts of the festival. There was also a variety of market stalls. With declining attendees that stemmed from the embarrassing failure at the 2009/2010 festival to perform a New Year countdown and the last-minute cancellation of numerous acts, the festival was shelved for 2013 and as of September that year its promoters were "exploring options for the festival to return in 2014". As of September 2020 this 'exploration' had still not resulted in any success.

== Artist lineups and festival related information by year ==
=== 2004 ===
Lineup: Regurgitator, Dallas Crane, Magic Dirt, The Butterfly Effect, Resin Dogs, Cog, Dexter presents The Shook Daily Crew, The Casanovas, Nubreed, 2 Dogs, Bliss n Eso, Offcuts, Baggsmen, Antiskeptic, True Live, The Red Eyes, Ben Quin, The Format, Willow, Small Mercies, The Gravy Train and more.

Originally held on 31 December as a one-day festival, it was organised by local Phillip Island resident, Angus Cameron, and his two cousins. They had approached the Bass Coast Shire council with the proposal which took two years to develop. Cameron recalled that they had underestimated the cost of establishing the festival.

=== 2005 ===
Lineup: John Butler Trio, Grinspoon, Stereo MC's, Xavier Rudd, Scribe, The Datsuns, Cog, Butterfingers, DJ Format, The Butterfly Effect, The Herd, Clare Bowditch & the Feeding Set, Sonic Animation, The Panics, Epicure, Airbourne, The Flairz, MO Black, The Morning Birds, Willow, Seven, The Restless, Custom Kings, Muph & Plutonic, British India, Ben Quin, Love Outside Andromeda, Trial Kennedy, Bodyjar, Art of Fighting, Gyroscope, Finkel has Fallen, Irix, Daytime, CWQ, N'FA (1200 Techniques) MC Trey & Maya Jupiter, Kid Confucius, Treva Whateva, Andy Smith, Tom Middleton, Bent DJ's, DJ Charlie Love, Lui, Daybreak Giants, MO Black, Cannon, Emdee, Gersey, Matt McLean vs Soren, Hermitude, Evil Nine, Spikey Tee, DJ Hype & MC Daddy Earl, Deep Child

=== 2006 ===
Lineup: The Living End, Silverchair, Xavier Rudd, Ugly Duckling, Evermore, The Freestylers, End of Fashion, Mylo Dj Set, The Grates, The Beautiful Girls, Brant Bjork and the Bros, Faker, Lior, Karnivool, Crazy Penis, TZU, True Live, Mia Dyson, Ash Grunwald, That 1 Guy, Sunk Loto, The Casanovas, Bomba, Bertie Blackman, Foreign Heights, K-Oscillate, Carus and The True Believers, Behind Crimson Eyes, The Josh Owen Band, Rob Sawyer, Jess McAvoy, The Loose Cannons, The Spazzy's, Bliss n Eso, Something with Numbers, The Red Eyes, Illzilla, Mammal, Sub Focus, Ben Quin, Durbeyfield, Lowrider, Digital Primate, Simon Sleiker, Bushido, The Legs, The Long Walk Home, Crimson Flames, Mushroom Giant, Des Peres, Dj Cecille, Lui Vegas, CWQ (Street performance)

The 2006 festival was the largest to date, with estimates of the crowd being as high as 15,000.

=== 2007 ===
Lineup: Hilltop Hoods, Grinspoon, The Cat Empire, You Am I, Apsci, Sneaky Sound System, Scribe, Chromeo, The Matches, Spank Rock, Shihad, Josh Pyke, Little Birdy, People Under The Stairs, Cog, Blue King Brown, Kora, Kisschasy, Buck 65, True Live vs Bliss N Eso, The Audreys, Howling Bells, Wolf & Cub, That 1 Guy, Ash Grunwald, Airbourne, British India, Dappled Cities Fly, Koolism, Horsell Common, Caged Baby, APSC, Mammal, Dallas Frasca, The Scare, Symbiosis, The Exploders, Young and Restless, Damn Arms, Lowrider, Bluejuice, Dardanelles, The Getaway Plan, Loren, Ben Quin, The Go Set, Ghostwood, The Currency, Sparkadia, Plastic Palace Alice, DJ Perplex, Spikey Tee, Smash Bang, Nic Nac, Bass Bin Laden vs Farmer Suitical, And Burn

The initial line-up was announced on Monday 10 September, with the second line-up announcement being made on Tuesday 23 October. The Black Keys and Fun Lovin' Criminals were also due to play, but cancelled in late December.

=== 2008 ===
Lineup: The Black Keys(USA), The Living End, The Getaway Plan, Morcheeba(UK), Cut Copy, Fat Freddy's Drop(NZ), Midnight Juggernauts, ~~The Vines~~, Stars(CAN), Digitalism(GER), Ladyhawke(NZ), Karnivool, Gyroscope, The Teenagers(FRA), The Herd, Dr. Dog(USA), Birds of Tokyo, Bob Evans, The Mess Hall, Little Red, Salmonella Dub(NZ), The Black Seeds(NZ), Resin Dogs, Platinum Pied Pipers(USA), Behind Crimson Eyes, Frightened Rabbit(UK), Drapht, Muph & Plutonic, Yo Majesty(USA), Bang Gang DJ's, Mammal, Children Collide, DJ Vadim & Yarah Bravo(USA), Downsyde, The Paper Scissors, Yves Klein Blue, Carus and The True Believers, Good Buddha, The Galvatrons, The Red Sun Band, Sugar Army, Beni, Kato and Oohee, Bonjah, The Scientists of Modern Music, Funkoars, Sunshine Brothers, Roger That, Hercules In NY, The Jezabels, Twelve Foot Ninja

=== 2009 ===
Lineup: Empire of the Sun, Van She, Grinspoon, Regurgitator, The Butterfly Effect, Cat Power, The Cat Empire, Ugly Duckling, Architecture in Helsinki, Faker, The Beautiful Girls, AMP Fiddler, Blue King Brown, Krafty Kuts, British India, The Drones, Tame Impala, Baddies, The Boxer Rebellion, Bluejuice, Grafton Primary, Clare Bowditch, Something With Numbers, Funkoars, Bumblebeez, Kram, Dead Letter Circus, Ponytail, Telepathe, The Juan Maclean, Phrase, The Fumes, Astronomy Class, Dallas Frasca, Sugar Army, Skipping Girl Vinegar, We Have Band, Cassette Kids, Red Riders, Sinden, Tom Ugly, Shockone, Diafrix, Jack Beats, Canyons, The Swiss, Bang Bang Eche, Bonjah, MM9, Regular John, Calling All Cars, Red Ink, Melodics, The Smoke, Chestwig, DJ Cecille, In Sol Inside

After almost three days of running as scheduled, three hours before New Year's Eve 2009, the festival was hit by a severe electrical storm on Phillip Island, although a much bigger storm hit the Fall's Festival that same night, which was incident-free. Organisers and bands in conjunction with security and emergency services personnel decided that moving the acts to the Pharaoh's Annex would be unsafe. Attendees who paid $300 for tickets to the event claimed "a lack of communication" left thousands of festival-goers stranded in the pouring rain for hours. Performances by Empire of the Sun, Grinspoon, The Butterfly Effect and Van She were delayed, moved and then abruptly cancelled after the storm damaged lighting and sound equipment on the main stage.

=== 2010 ===
Lineup: N.E.R.D, The Temper Trap, Arrested Development, Chromeo, Xavier Rudd, Gyroscope, Midnight Juggernauts, Mystery Jets, Little Red, Trentemoller, Operator Please, Light Speed Champion, Miami Horror, Built to Spill, Shout out louds, Aeroplane, Tinie Tempah, Future of the Left, Born Ruffians, Liam Finn, Basement Birds, Philadelphia Grand Jury, Gypsy and the Cat, Jebediah, Tumbleweed, Urthboy, Oh Mercy, Violent Soho, The John Steel Singers, Glenn Richards, Koolism, Space Invadas, Wagons, Yuksek, Dam Funk, M-Phazes, Horrorshow, Lowrider, The Holidays, Illy, Ernest Ellis, Baskery, The Red Eyes, Split Syndicate, Hungry Kids of Hungry, Neon Indian, Stonefield, Kimbra, Cabins, Papa VS Pretty, Jericco, Bang Gang DJ's, Red Coats, Black and White, Ajax, Gloves.

2011 Scissor Sisters, Boy and Bear, Bluejuice, Xavier Rudd
