= Peats Ridge Festival =

Peats Ridge Festival was an Australian sustainable arts and music festival, held in Glenworth Valley, Peats Ridge, one hour's drive north of Sydney and a 90-minute drive from Newcastle, New South Wales. Established in 2004, one year after the death of the founder of the Glenworth Valley Horse Riding facility, the Festival was recognised as one of the world's leading sustainability events. It ran for three days around New Year's Eve, from 29 December to 1 January. The event organisers relied heavily on volunteer support, and volunteer service was rewarded with a free ticket. That type of employment strategy was one of many of the sustainable options chosen by the organisers of the festival.

The festival was a camping event and was open to all ages, with free entrance for children under six, and a full program of events and activities for families and children, in addition to family camping areas.

In addition to the music artists, the festival featured an arts program packed with visual and installation arts, performance, comedy, contemporary dance and theatre. Peats Ridge was recognised for discovering and presenting up-and-coming bands and artists, supported by an application process for emerging acts. In 2010 Angus and Julia Stone, previous up-and-coming artists, headlined on the first night of the event, showing the goodwill that the festival fostered between organisers and performers alike.

Shortly after the 2012 festival, the company running it went into liquidation, citing poor ticket sales. However, there were accusations that Matt Grant, the festival organiser, had embezzled $1.3 million and destroyed records. Many creditors, including the John Butler Trio, were owed a total of $1.25 million.

== Awards and accreditations ==
The Peats Ridge Festival was recognised on both a national and international level for its focus and achievement in sustainability. The festival was awarded:

- Outstanding Greener Festival for The Greener Festival Awards in 2007, 2009, 2010 and most recently 2011
- The Environmental Sustainability Award for the 2008 NSW State Government Green Globe Awards
- The Small Business Award for the 2009 NSW State Government Green Globe Awards
- Best Achievement in Sustainability for the 2009 & 2010 Australian Event Awards
- Most Green Friendly award the 2009 FasterLouder Festival Awards

The Peats Ridge Festival was officially acknowledged by the UN for its work in environmental education, and in 2010 was the founding partner of the UN Music and Environmental Initiative.

== Glenworth Valley ==
Glenworth Valley is one hour north of Sydney and 15 minutes from Gosford, located in the hinterland region of the NSW Central Coast. A 90-minute drive along the freeway from Newcastle, the valley features 3,000 acres (12 km^{2}) of wilderness and is situated around the winding Popran Creek, which leads to the Hawkesbury River. The festival site was located in flat green meadows and was surrounded by a wooded escarpment 200 metres high. There were three designated swimming holes, two in the Festival precinct and one alongside the non-vehicle camping area, all of which had lifeguards on duty each day. In addition to the arts, music, workshops and performance programs, The Glenworth Valley Adventure Centre offered a range of activities aimed at helping people enjoy the natural surroundings of the valley.

== Sustainability ==
Peats Ridge Festival was one of the first festivals in the world to promote, and continue to advocate sustainability. It was also the first major Australian event to run solely on renewable energy. Peats Ridge encouraged its suppliers to minimise waste from the festival. For example, stallholders were required to sort their waste into three different types: recycling, compost and general. Scraps were composted, recycling sorted and waste disposed of in a sustainable manner, in accordance with the Festivals guidelines. Just about everything bought or sold at the Festival was either recyclable or compostable. Volunteer staff collected the rubbish and sorted through it before it left the grounds. Though some flooding was known to occur at the site, the festival was generally unaffected by flooding problems. However, the 2007 the festival was cancelled for the only time due to extreme weather.

The festival featured many initiatives for running a sustainable event, such as using composting toilets, a rafted reed bed grey water management system, source separated waste streams, composting, the use of low-impact cleaning products, using reclaimed materials for event décor, and a container return system for all drink containers and cups.

Other initiatives included:

- Eco Living Village

As part of the sustainability program, Peats Ridge featured an Eco Living Village, which was an educational space promoting sustainability activities. There was a diverse series of workshops, running across the entire duration of the festival, examining a broad range of sustainability topics, including: waste reduction, grey water management systems, composting, community gardening and improving workplace sustainability. The Eco Village also features an organic shopping market with organic food and coffee outlets. Markets featuring clothes, crafts, music, toys, food and more are open every day.

- Educational opportunities

The Peats Ridge team were involved in an educational capacity to promote event sustainability through university lectures, guest speakers to new event managers, event case studies and collaboration with government and community programs. In 2010 the festival was the only southern hemisphere founding partner in the United Nations Music & Environment Initiative.

- Online communities

The festival developed the online "Model Event" gateway on the Peats Ridge Festival website. This portal shared information on matters such as green procurement, waste management, grey water systems and emission reductions, for events of all sizes.

== Indigenous program ==
The Peats Ridge Festival included a program dedicated to Australia's indigenous heritage and featured strong indigenous components within all elements of the program, including music, dance, food, workshops, movie screenings and artworks. An Indigenous Boardi Space was organised and run by the local Darkinjung people, and was dedicated to their stories and culture. Workshops and knowledge sharing sessions were held, examining the stories of the land, bush foods, medicines and culture of Australia's indigenous people. The opening and closing ceremonies of the festival featured elements of Australian indigenous rituals, which are aimed at acknowledging the spirits of the land.

== Children's program ==
In addition to the dedicated family camping area, the festival featured a children's program. There were three areas that catered for all ages of children: ages 3 to 7, ages 7 to 12, and ages 13 to 17, each with a program filled with art, music, dance, performance and more. The youngest children could enjoy the Rainbow Garden, an under seven's children's play area, puppet shows, face painting, children's yoga, children's theatre, circus skills workshops, and many other children's performances. For young teens aged 13 to 17, the Chillout Lounge featured workshops on song writing, body percussion, cartooning, fashion and jewellery making. In the evenings, the Chillout Lounge was where young people could showcase their talent, and sing, recite, dance, juggle or perform. The Lounge also provided space to relax on couches, paint, and enjoy live performances and DJs.

== New Year's Eve ==
New Year's Eve was celebrated by a masquerade parade in which everybody at the festival, including performers and artists were involved. Costumes and masks were encouraged, and there were mask-making workshops which provided the necessary fabrics and accessories. The New Year's parade kicked off in the early evening, and snaked its way through the festival, picking up people as it went. The remainder of the evening featured the usual musical acts and dance parties, and continued late into the night.

== Workshops and healing area ==
The Festival featured a wide range of free workshops, all of which were designed to suit adults of all ages. Workshops include Pilates, stand up comedy, taekwondo, poi, Bollywood, singing, yoga, African dance, juggling, laughter yoga, capoeira and more. The Healing Haven was a focused area for calm and healing, and included workshops and sessions with a focus on natural healing.

== Arts and music programs ==
The Peats Ridge Festival was recognised for discovering and presenting up-and-coming bands and artists. There was an application process for artists and musicians which allowed new arts and music projects to apply to perform at the Festival. Hundreds of bands and thousands of artists performed each year at the festival.

=== Arts program ===
The Peats Ridge Festival featured a dedicated area for arts and theatre, called SideWays Alley, located along the riverfront. The arts program featured over 1,500 artists, performing puppetry, mime, spoken word, dance, music, circus and visual arts. A main feature was the Bohemian Love Theatre, which was described as "a barefoot velvet vaudeville club, boho glam rock ‘n roll circus, a bohemian absinthe den, and lost-in-tie faerie tale speakeasy dream world," and featureg a number of comedy, dance, circus, cabaret and musical acts. The backyard of the Bohemian Love Theatre is the Avant Garden is a space for painting, organic wine and Sangria and enjoying the surroundings. The application process provided opportunities for new artists to establish themselves in an internationally recognised arena.

=== Musical acts and line-ups ===
The Peats Ridge Festival appreciated different styles of music, and featured new and developing bands. Musicians could also apply via a similar application process to that for artists. The festival featured eight stages of music, including the dub shack, and a disco tent, as well as partner stages with sponsors. Stages featured were:

- Bellbird − the main stage, featuring many of the larger bands, which was also the venue for the opening and closing ceremonies,
- Lyrebird − a big top with a focus on dub/reggae, blues and chilled out beats,
- Underworld − featuring new, cutting-edge artists,
- Chai Temple − the acoustic music stage accompanied by cushions and chai,
- Phoenix − featured a range of new musical acts from electro to jazz to folk to post punk
- Vic's Disco − an Eastern European dance and disco party tent,
- Dubshack − a dedicated dub stage presented by three of Sydney's biggest bass pushers,
- Drum and Dance Temple − performers and facilitators led the temple with workshops, drumming and dance.

Festival line-ups featured a combination of Australian acts and internationally acclaimed artists.

==== 2005 ====
- Cornerstone Roots
- Lior
- The Red Eyes
- King Tide
- Waiting for Guinness
- Jess Randall & Friends
- Darth Vegas
- Orient Express
- Rastawookie
- Endorphin
- Inga Liljestrom
- Afro Moses
- Coda
- Iota
- Emily Maguire (UK)
- Stiff Gins
- Caribbean Soul

==== 2006 ====
- Afro Moses with Moses O'Jah
- Carla Werner
- Angus & Julia Stone
- Tim Freedman
- Hermitude
- Blacqseedz Dancers
- Akasa
- Elana Stone
- The Black Seeds
- Emma Donovan
- Extended Family
- Ish
- Banco de Gaia
- Kate Miller-Heidke
- King Tide
- Martinez
- The McMenamins

==== 2007 ====
In 2007, the Peats Ridge Festival was cancelled due to extreme weather conditions. Improvements were made to the site, making a recurrence less likely.

==== 2008 ====
(This was 'take two' of the cancelled 2007 Peats Ridge Festival. A similar line-up of performers, as listed below, had been booked to perform in 2007. All artists apologised to the crowd during their performances.)

- Salmonella Dub (NZ)
- Geoffrey Gurrumul Yunupingu
- Jon Cleary (USA)
- Frightened Rabbit (UK)
- Hawksley Workman (CAN)
- Mamadou Diabate (MALI)
- King Tide
- Bluejuice
- Hermitude
- The Temper Trap
- Monsieur Camembert
- Mista Savona
- Pivot
- The Fumes
- Chris Kayana Gudu
- Sparkadia
- Basslines
- Papa vs Pretty

==== 2009 ====
- Sarah Blasko
- The Panics
- Blue King Brown
- Liam Finn
- Mark Pritchard/Harmonic 313
- Kid Sam
- The Jezabels
- Dappled Cities
- Whitley
- Bertie Blackman
- Jeff Lang
- The Nomad (NZ)
- Ash Grunwald
- Leader Cheetah
- Jack Ladder
- Astronomy Class
- The Bird
- Lamb
- Jen Cloher and the Endless Sea
- Diafrix
- deepchild

==== 2010 ====
- Angus & Julia Stone
- King Tide
- Trentmoller
- Built to Spill
- Freestylers
- Kate Miller-Heidke
- Shout Out Louds
- The Dynamites Featuring Charles Walker
- Born Ruffians
- Lightspeed Champion
- PVT
- Decoder Ring
- The Audreys
- The Break
- Washington
- Cloud Control
- Jonathan Boulet
- Freq Nasty
- Space Invadas
- Horrorshow
- Thundamentals

==== 2011 ====
- Gotye
- Xavier Rudd
- Salmonella Dub
- Stanton Warriors
- Dum Dum Girls
- LTJ Bukem
- Hanggai
- Mountain Mocha Kilmanjaro
- Hanni El Khatib
- A Skillz
- The Holidays
- Tijuana Cartel
- Eagle and the Worm
- Electronic DJ Set
- Oh Mercy
- Canyons
- Hermitude
- Passenger
- Yukon Blonde
- Ball Park Music
- The Paper Scissors
