= Live at the Sydney Opera House (Josh Pyke album) =

Studio album by Josh Pyke with Sydney Symphony Orchestra
- Released: 1 July 2016
- Recorded: 29–30 April 2015
- Venue: Sydney Opera House
- Length: 70:10
- Label: Sydney Symphony Orchestra / ABC Music

Josh Pyke albums chronology
But for All These Shrinking Hearts (2015)	Live at the Sydney Opera House (2016)	The Best of Josh Pyke, B Sides and Rarities (2017)

Live at the Sydney Opera House is a live album by Australian singer-songwriter Josh Pyke with the Sydney Symphony Orchestra. It was released in July 2016 and peaked at number 27 on the ARIA Charts.

Upon release, Pyke said "[I'm] very excited to say the live recordings of the shows I did with the Sydney Symphony Orchestra at the amazing Sydney Opera House are out now! I'm so proud of this record. The whole experience was amazingly rewarding and a huge learning curve for me. I love the fact that these songs have been given a new lease on life in this new form, and I can't wait to share them with you! Thank you so much for your support, and I hope you enjoy the record."

At the ARIA Music Awards of 2016, the album won the ARIA Award for Best Original Soundtrack, Cast or Show Album.

== Reception ==
Professional ratings
Review scores
Source	Rating
The Music	3/5 stars

Tim Kroenert from The Music said "Collaborations between popular artists and orchestras often feel ego-driven, yet the songs performed here, selected mostly from Pyke's first four albums (the shows predated 2015's But for All These Shrinking Hearts), at least conspire to remind us what a smart songwriter he is. His voice is in great shape too, and the arrangements bring genuine freshness: tribal percussion and solo trumpet make an oddity of 'Still Some Big Deal'; swelling strings carry 'Goldmines' from alt-country to Spaghetti Western; the woodwind flourishes on 'Love Lies' are lovely. Elsewhere, 'Sew My Name', 'Memories & Dust' and others simply bloom with renewed drama."

== Track listing ==
No.	Title	Length
1.	"The Summer"	3:50
2.	"Sew My Name"	4:10
3.	"The Lighthouse Song"	3:55
4.	"Still Some Big Deal"	4:39
5.	"Goldmines"	5:40
6.	"Parking Lots"	3:24
7.	"Order Has Abandoned Us"	2:13
8.	"Vibrations in Air"	4:40
9.	"Bug Eyes Beauty"	2:56
10.	"Memories & Dust"	3:50
11.	"Leeward Side"	3:18
12.	"Fill You In"	5:29
13.	"Cloves' Sons"	5:12
14.	"Middle of the Hill"	2:38
15.	"Love Lies"	6:12
16.	"Where Two Oceans Meet"	4:26
17.	"Middle of the Hill" (encore)	3:20

== Charts ==
Chart (2016)	Peak position
Australian Albums (ARIA)	27

== Release history ==
Region	Date	Format	Label	Catalogue
Australia	1 July 2016	CD; digital download; streaming	Australian Broadcasting Corporation	4794802
