= Feeding the Wolves =

Feeding the Wolves may refer to:

- Feeding the Wolves (10 Years album), 2010
- Feeding the Wolves (EP), a 2005 EP by Josh Pyke
