= Motorway (disambiguation) =

A motorway is a type of high-speed road only allowing certain vehicles.

Motorway may also refer to:

- Motorway (brand), a UK car marketplace
- Motorway (typeface)
- Motorway (film)

== See also ==
- Interstate
- Freeway (disambiguation)
- Expressway (disambiguation)
- Highway
- Road
- Dual carriageway
