= The Exploders =

Australian alternative rock band

- Origin: Lake Bolac, Victoria, Australia
- Genres: Alternative rock, psychedelic rock, garage rock
- Years active: 2005–present
- Labels: Rubber Records
- Members: TJ Allender; Paul Doery; Malcolm Clark; J. Cortez; Louis Macklin
- Past members: Matt Britten
- Website: Official Website

The Exploders are an alternative rock band from Lake Bolac, Victoria, Australia.

== Biography ==
The Exploders formed in 2004 and were picked up by the label Rubber Records in 2005, appearing at the Falls Festival the following year. They released their self-titled debut album on 21 March 2006. They toured extensively in 2006 and appeared as the house band on Rove Live.

In the latter half of 2006, they flew to Dallas, Texas to record their second album with producer Stuart Sikes (Modest Mouse, The White Stripes, Cat Power, Hot Hot Heat), later completing the album in Melbourne with Dave Parkin (Snowman, Bob Evans, Jebediah). The album, Easy and the Sun was released 4 August 2007.

They have appeared at Splendour in the Grass (2006), The Great Escape (2007), Pyramid Rock Festival (2007) and the Falls Festival (2006 & 2007). The Exploders have performed with You Am I, The Bees and The Zutons, and have undertaken national tours supporting The Panda Band, Dallas Crane and Evermore.

== Members ==
- TJ Allender – guitar, vocals
- Matt Britten – drums (ex)
- J. Cortez – guitar
- Malcolm Clark – drums
- Paul Doery – bass
- Louis Macklin – keyboards

== Discography ==
=== Albums ===
- The Exploders - Rubber Records (2006)
- Easy and the Sun - Rubber Records (2007)
- On the Farm - Rubber Records (2009)
- Orchestratospheric - Rubber Records (2012)
