= Oh We Do Like to Be Beside the Seaside =

Studio album by The Vasco Era
- Released: 5 May 2007
- Recorded: 2006
- Genre: Indie rock
- Length: 34:53
- Label: Universal Australia
- Producer: Jeff Saltzman

The Vasco Era chronology
Miles (2005)	Oh We Do Like to Be Beside the Seaside (2007)

Oh We Do Like to Be Beside the Seaside is the debut Studio album by Melbourne based band, The Vasco Era. It peaked at No. 40 on the ARIA Albums Chart.

At the J Awards of 2007, the album was nominated for Australian Album of the Year.

== Track listing ==
1. "When It First Showed Up" – 2:56
2. "When We All Lost It" – 1:47
3. "When We Tried to Get You to Settle Down" – 3:12
4. "When You Went" – 3:29
5. "When We Tried to Party to Forget About It" – 4:46
6. "When We Forgot to Ask Ourselves Why It Ever Came" – 3:23
7. "When We Lost Faith in Everyone, Especially Middle-Aged People" – 1:42
8. "Honey Bee (When It Was Making Weird Love Songs)" – 5:19
9. "When We Were Gettin' to Forgiving You" – 2:11
10. "When the Good Times Were Coming" – 6:08\

== Charts ==
Chart performance for Oh We Do Like to Be Beside the Seaside
Chart (2007)	Peak position
Australian Albums (ARIA)	40
