= The Vasco Era =

Australian band

- Origin: Apollo Bay, Victoria, Australia
- Genres: Rock, blues
- Years active: 2004–present
- Past members: Sid O'Neil; Ted O'Neil; Michael Fitzgerald
- Website: Official website

The Vasco Era are an Australian three piece rock and blues band.

== Career ==
Originally from Apollo Bay, but now based in Melbourne, the band's members are brothers Sid (vocals, guitar, lapsteel, rototoms) and Ted O'Neil (bass) and Michael Fitzgerald (drums). In 2004 the band won the Australian National Campus Band Competition, the largest band competition in the southern hemisphere.

The band played major festivals in Australia including Southbound, the East Coast Blues & Roots Music Festival, The Great Escape, Groovin' The Moo, the Apollo Bay Music Festival and the Falls Festival. Also in 2006, the band flew to San Francisco to record their debut album with producer Jeff Saltzman. The first single from the album, "When We All Lost It" was released to radio on 29 October 2006. Their debut album Oh We Do Like To Be Beside The Seaside was released on 5 May 2007. It was also nominated for the 2007 J Award for Australian album of the year on Australian youth independent radio station Triple J. A second album, Lucille was released in early 2010. A self-titled third album was released on 14 October 2011.

From 2009's Lucille to 2025's I Don't Mind, the band took a multi-year hiatus, primarily caused by frontman Sid O'Neil stepping away from music and finding a job as a social worker. In this time, while the other two members were at first lost in what to do, they all attended university. They both eventually began working at a local girls high school, working with the (Junior Australian Music Program) Young Hearts band, and focused on their personal lives, as well as forming Localles with members from other bands. After the hiatus came to an end, the three began playing live together, before spending 18 months perfecting their next album.

== Discography ==
=== Albums ===
List of studio albums, with selected details and chart positions
Title	Album details	Peak chart positions
Title	Album details	AUS
Oh We Do Like to Be Beside the Seaside	Released: 2007; Label: Universal Music Australia (1720133); Formats: CD, digital download	40
Lucille	Released: 2010; Label: Universal Music Australia (2711134); Formats: CD, digital download	48
The Vasco Era	Released: 14 October 2011; Label: Era Records (ERA001CD); Formats: CD, digital download	94
I Don't Mind	Released: 19 September 2025; Label: Marthouse; Formats: LP, digital download	99

=== Live albums ===
List of live albums, with selected details
Title	Album details
Live at the Annandale Hotel	Released: 2008; Label: Annandale Hotel (ADH 002); Formats: LP

=== Extended plays ===
List of extended plays, with selected details and chart positions
Title	EP details	Peak chart positions
Title	EP details	AUS
The Vasco Era	Released: 2003; Label: The Vasco Era; Formats: CD, DD	—
Let It Burn	Released: 2004; Label: The Vasco Era; Formats: CD, DD	—
Miles	Released: 2005; Label: Era Records (9871130); Formats: CD, DD	66

== Awards and nominations ==
=== J Award ===
The J Awards are an annual series of Australian music awards that were established by the Australian Broadcasting Corporation's youth-focused radio station Triple J. They commenced in 2005.

Year	Nominee / work	Award	Result
J Awards of 2007	Oh We Do Like to Be Beside the Seaside	Australian Album of the Year	Nominated
