= Bonjah =

Australian musical ensemble

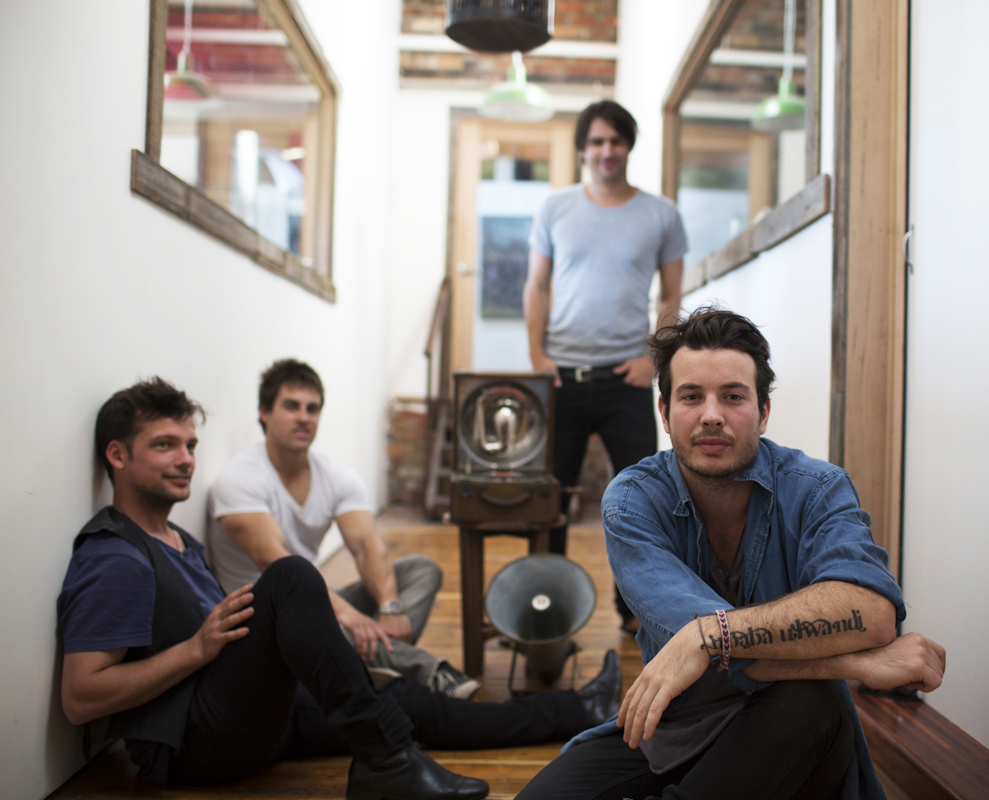
- Bonjah in Melbourne, 5 October 2010

Background information
- Origin: Tauranga, Bay of Plenty, New Zealand
- Genres: Blues & Roots, Alternative Rock
- Years active: 2006–2016
- Label: Independent
- Members: Glenn Mossop; Regan Lethbridge; David Morgan; Dan Chisholm
- Website: bonjahmusic.com

Bonjah were a four-piece band based in Melbourne, Australia. Bonjah was formed in 2006 in Tauranga New Zealand by Glenn Mossop, Regan Lethbridge, David Morgan, and Dan Chisholm. The band's tours include Japan, England, Germany, New Zealand and have toured Australia extensively through numerous national tours. The group have been nominated for various awards and supported major artists such as The Who, G Love & Special Sauce, The Beautiful Girls, Paul Kelly, Raggamuffin, Arrested Development, The Black Seeds, Trinity Roots, Eskimo Joe. Most commonly known for their blues roots element of music the group have progressively moved towards a soulful rock infused style which is evident in the 2011 Go Go Chaos album.

== Festivals ==
Bonjah have featured at numerous Australian and International major festivals including Big Day Out, Woodford Folk Festival, Pyramid Rock Festival, Festival of the Sun, Apollo Bay Music Festival, West Coast Blues & Roots Festival & featured at various International festivals including Germany's JUWI FESTin 2012 & Greenroom Festival in Japan.

In 2013, BONJAH released their first track from the Beautiful Wild album titled Evolution. March 2014 saw the group release their second single from the album titled Honey with an anticipated album release in early April.

== History ==
Glenn Mossop, Regan Lethbridge, David Morgan, and Dan Chisholm first met at school in Tauranga, New Zealand and in 2004 when the members were studying at university in Dunedin, New Zealand the group went under the moniker Bonjahbango.

In later 2006 Bonjahbango was shortened to BONJAH and the members relocated to Melbourne, Australia. In 2009 Bonjah's track Fly was featured through various promotional campaigns and in March the band released Until Dawn with lead single Bring Back The Fire receiving an Apra Nomination for best Blues & Roots song of the year and was later followed with Fly the second single which was also inducted for Apra nominations.

During the summer of 2009 BONJAH toured Australia extensively and supported major artists such as The Who, The Beautiful Girls, Paul Kelly, Raggamuffin and played at many Australian festivals including Pyramid Rock Festival, Festival of the Sun, One Movement Festival and Moomba Festival.

The lead single from the Album Bring Back The Fire was re released in 2010 and later featured on a 20th Century Fox movie Matching Jack which was a film based on an unfilmed script by Renew entitled Love and Mortar Matching jack opened at number eight at the Australian box office in its opening weekend, taking in total $258,011.

Following Bring Back The Fire's national release BONJAH ended up donating all of their proceeds to the Leukemia cause and was later invited to play "light the night" which was a leukaemia benefit showcase that also featured multi ARIA award winner Wendy Mathews and members of the Jersey Boys at Sydney's recital hall on behalf of the Leukemia Foundation.

In 2011 BONJAH released Go Go Chaos box collection set through Shock Records and toured Australia extensively on the back of their release with Triple J presenting the national tour.

The group ended the Go Go Chaos tour in 2012 with a sell out showcase at The Corner Hotel in Melbourne where they partnered with Make a wish foundation Australia and ended up donating $1 of every ticket sold raising hundreds of dollars for the charitable foundation

== Discography ==
=== Albums ===
- Until Dawn (6 Mar 2009) MGM
- Go Go Chaos (15 Jul 2011) Shock Records
- Live at the Corner 2012 (31 Aug 2012) Gaga Digi
- Beautiful Wild (18 Apr 2014) AUS No. 41 Inertia

=== Singles ===
- Bring Back The Fire (10 Feb 2009)
- Fly (17 Feb 2009)
- Something We Should Know (1 Oct 2010)
- The White Line (3 Feb 2011)

== Awards and nominations ==
=== APRA Awards ===
Year	Nominee / work	Award	Result
2010	Fly	Best Blues & Roots Single	Nominated
2010	Bring Back The Fire	Best Blues & Roots Single	Nominated

=== AIR Awards ===
The Australian Independent Record Awards (commonly known informally as AIR Awards) is an annual awards night to recognise, promote and celebrate the success of Australia's Independent Music sector.

Year	Nominee / work	Award	Result
2009	Until Dawn	Best Blues & Roots Album	Nominated
2011	Go Go Chaos	Best Blues & Roots Album	Nominated

=== Rolling Stone Awards ===
Year	Nominee / work	Award	Result
2011	Artist Nomination	Artist To Watch	Nominated

== See also ==
- Music of Australia

== Sources ==
- MGM Distribution
- Matching Jack
- APRA Awards of 2010
