= Beaks of Crows =

EP by Josh Pyke
- Released: July 2007
- Genre: Alternative rock
- Length: 17:20
- Label: Ivy League Records

Josh Pyke chronology
Memories & Dust (2007)	Beaks of Crows (2007)	Chimney's Afire (2008)

Beaks of Crows is the fourth EP by Australian singer-songwriter Josh Pyke. It was released in July 2007 on Ivy League Records. It features a live version of the song "Fill You In", recorded at the Wesley Anne in Northcote, Melbourne.

== Track listing ==
No.	Title	Length
1.	"The 9 & The 5"	4:19
2.	"Breathe Gently"	4:16
3.	"The Time I Just Bought"	4:22
4.	"Fill You In" (Live at The Wesley Anne)	4:25
