= Apsci =

Musical duo

ApSci
- Origin: Australia, United States
- Genre: Avant-pop
- Years active: 1998–present
- Labels: Elefant Traks, Ekler'o'shock, Quannum Projects
- Members: Ra Lamotta; Dana Diaz-Tutaan
- Past members: >DJ Big Wiz; DJ Boo; Guy Licata

ApSci is an Australian video-centric avant pop duo with origins in indie hip-hop. As individuals, their roots go back to punk rock and opera. The duo consists of Bronx born, New Jersey-bred Ra Lamotta and his Filipino-Australian wife Dana Diaz-Tutaan. The duo, which has been performing together since meeting in 1998, has received added attention after being signed to underground hip-hop label Quannum Projects in 2004. The band name is a portmanteau of "applied science."

== History ==
Raphael LaMotta, previously known as Raphael Heatley, began his musical career as bassist for the New York City indie punk group Vitapup before expanding to production work in New York City music studios. Then Sydney-based Dana Diaz-Tutaan, a classically trained singer with theater background, was heavily involved in the Australian hip-hop underground scene at this point, and met LaMotta through mutual friends when she travelled to NYC to complete some studio sessions with hip-hop outfit Meta Bass'n'Breath. After Diaz-Tutaan relocated to NYC, the pair began playing as Applied Science in many downtown clubs such as Baby Jupiter, The Knitting Factory, CBGB's and the Nuyorican. In this period they met now resident Def Jux DJ, DJ Big Wiz. Soon after they also started working with drummer Guy Licata, known for his work with Bill Laswell, The Collective, Dr. Israel, Hercules and Love Affair and Santigold.

The group released their first album, Get It Twisted, on Australian indie hip-hop label Elefant Traks on November 17, 2003, and their European EP Release of Tirade Highway in early 2004. Around this time, Diaz-Tutaan signed on to work with American underground hip-hop group Blackalicious during the latter group's Australian tour. During the tour, the duo garnered the attention of Blackalicious DJ Chief Xcel, who was impressed with their recently released CD. Chief Xcel soon signed the group to Quannum Projects, and with his blessing Get It Twisted was re-released as Thanks for Asking on July 26, 2005. The new version of the album was primarily produced by LaMotta and features guest spots by Big Wiz's Def Jux labelmate Mr. Lif, Tunde of TV On The Radio, Martin Perna of [Antibalas] and Pigeon John (Quannum Projects). During their European tours they've played outdoor festivals such as the well-known Eurockéennes Festival, where they picked up French-based DJ Gero, DMC France Champion.

In 2006, Diaz-Tutaan was asked to play the lead role of Imelda Marcos in Here Lies Love, a musical collaboration with David Byrne & Fat Boy Slim. Diaz-Tutaan performed alongside Byrne at the premier of the musical in the Adelaide Festival.

Over 2007 ApSci continued to do shows throughout Europe, U.S., Asia and Australia including recent headlining the 2007 Pyramid Rock Festival for NYE. They have reportedly been working on their sophomore record due Winter 08 on Quannum Projects.

LaMotta featured on the Plump DJs single 'Shifting Gears'.

In 2009 ApSci released 'Best Crisis Ever' on Quannum Projects. The first single & video 'Under Control' was shot entirely with an iPhone and garnered attention from Wired.com. The second single 'Crazy Crazy Insane' was featured in a Time Warner Cable commercial and the song's video was featured on YouTube's homepage.

== Discography ==
=== Studio albums ===
- Get It Twisted (2003, Elefant Traks)
- Thanks for Asking (2005, Quannum Projects)
- Best Crisis Ever (2009, Quannum Projects)

=== Singles ===
- "See That?" (12") (2005, Quannum Projects)
- "Tirade Highway" (12") (2004 Ekler'o'shock)
