= Thanks for Asking =

Studio album by Apsci
- Released: July 26, 2005
- Genre: Alternative hip hop
- Length: 70:44
- Label: Quannum Projects
- Producer: Raphael Lamotta

Apsci chronology
Get It Twisted (2003)	Thanks for Asking (2005)

Professional ratings
Review scores
Source	Rating
Allmusic	3.5/5 stars
Okayplayer	3.5/5 stars

Thanks for Asking is an alternative hip hop album by Apsci, released on Quannum Projects on July 26, 2005. The album includes songs from the groups Elefant Traks debut Get It Twisted, plus newer tracks produced by frontman Ra LaMotta. Guest spots include appearances by Quannum labelmates Pigeon John and Vursatyl (of Lifesavas) as well as Def Jux rapper Mr. Lif.

== Track listing ==
1. "It's Apsci (Intro)" – 0:10
2. "Tirade Highway" – 2:34
3. "Never Give Up" – 2:33
4. "Bike Messenger Diaries" – 3:31
5. "Runaway" (featuring Tunde Abimpe of TV on the Radio) – 3:36
6. "Voice Print Identification" – 0:52
7. "Anais & Godzilla" – 2:56
8. "Stompin'" (featuring Pigeon John) – 2:34
9. "See That?" (featuring Mr. Lif) – 2:22
10. "KI 6am" – 0:37
11. "Cherubic" – 3:09
12. "Rob the Bank" (featuring Martin of Antibalas) – 3:43
13. "Robosex" – 3:32
14. "Puttin' on the Fitz" (featuring Vursatyl) – 4:03
15. "The Reception (Outro)" – 0:41
16. "Pep Rally" – 8:04
17. "Flystyles" – 25:47
