= Illzilla =

Australian hip hop group

- Origin: Melbourne, Victoria, Australia
- Genres: Hip-hop
- Years active: 2004–present
- Labels: Obese Records, Shock Records
- Members: MC Mantra; 1/6; Mista Savona; Tom Martin; Bob Knob; Julian Goyma
- Past members: Paul Havea

Illzilla are an Australian hip hop group featuring live instruments. The group mix funk, reggae and rock.

Illzilla released their debut album Wasteland in 2008. They were a Victorian winner of Triple J's Unearthed competition and were nominated for the Unearthed J Award.

== Discography ==
- Wasteland (2008) - Shock
- Illzilla EP (2005) - Obese

== Awards and nominations ==
=== J Award ===
The J Awards are an annual series of Australian music awards that were established by the Australian Broadcasting Corporation's youth-focused radio station Triple J. They commenced in 2005.

| Year | Nominee / work | Award | Result |
|---|---|---|---|
| J Awards of 2007 | themselves | Unearthed Artist of the Year | Nominated |
