= Memories & Dust =

Studio album by Josh Pyke
- Released: 10 March 2007
- Recorded: 2006
- Genres: Alternative rock, Indie, Pop/rock
- Length: 42:30
- Label: Ivy League Records
- Producers: Wayne Connolly; Josh Pyke

Josh Pyke chronology
Feeding the Wolves (2005)	Memories & Dust (2007)	Beaks of Crows (2007)

Singles from Memories & Dust
- 1. "Memories & Dust" Released: 10 October 2006; 2. "Lines on Palms" Released: 3 March 2007; 3. "Fed & Watered" Released: May 2007; 4. "Forever Song" Released: September 2007; 5. "Sew My Name" Released: October 2007

Memories & Dust is the debut studio album by Australian singer-songwriter, Josh Pyke. It was released in March in 2007 and peaked at number 4 on the ARIA Charts and was certified platinum in 2020.

At the J Awards of 2007, the album was nominated for Australian Album of the Year.

At the ARIA Music Awards of 2007, the album was nominated for five awards, with Pyke winning Best Adult Contemporary Album, Pyke and Connolly winning Producer of the Year and Connolly winning Engineer of the Year.

== Reception ==
Professional ratings
Review scores
Source	Rating
AllMusic	4/5 stars

Bernard Zuel from Sydney Morning Herald described the music as evocative and moving and Pyke as "inventive" and "know[ing] how to construct music and lyrics into a form that is more than the sum of its parts

Noel Mengel from Courier Mail found that the songs had a "logical sequence," "each leading to the next and illuminating those around it." He praised "Someone Else's Town" for its "handsome string arrangement" and "Fed and Watered" as "bright and bouncy." Kathy McCabe from Daily Telegraph admired the melody and detail of the lyrics and music and described "Vibrations in Air" as "goose-bumpingly beautiful."

== Track listing ==
No.	Title	Length
1.	"Lines on Palms"	3:04
2.	"Memories & Dust"	3:06
3.	"Forever Song"	2:52
4.	"Mannequins"	3:31
5.	"Someone Else's Town"	3:31
6.	"Fed and Watered"	3:53
7.	"Sew My Name"	3:17
8.	"Covers Are Thrown"	3:11
9.	"Middle of the Hill"	2:28
10.	"Buttons"	4:05
11.	"Vibrations in Air"	4:15
12.	"Monkey with a Drum"	5:18

iTunes Bonus Tracks
No.	Title	Length
13.	"Unit 11"	3:48
14.	"Birdcage on the Faultline"
15.	Untitled	4:59

Some editions were also sold with Feeding the Wolves as a bonus CD.

=== UK Version ===
The UK had an alternate track listing.

No.	Title	Length
1.	"Lines on Palms"	3:04
2.	"Memories & Dust"	3:06
3.	"Mannequins"	3:31
4.	"Someone Else's Town"	3:31
5.	"Private Education" (Taken from Feeding the Wolves)	3:25
6.	"Sew My Name"	3:17
7.	"Covers Are Thrown"	3:11
8.	"Beg Your Pardon" (Taken from Feeding the Wolves)	3:24
9.	"Vibrations in Air"	4:15
10.	"Monkey with a Drum"	5:18

== Charts ==
Chart (2007)	Peak position
Australian Albums (ARIA)	4

== Certifications ==
Region	Certification	Certified units/sales
Australia (ARIA)	Platinum	70,000^{‡}
^{‡} Sales+streaming figures based on certification alone.

== Release history ==
Region	Date	Format	Label	Catalogue
Australia	10 March 2007	CD; digital download	Ivy League Records	IVY050
Europe	2007	CD; digital download	Ivy League Records	1721395
Australia	2017	LP; streaming	Ivy League Records	IVY357
