= Southeast Freeway =

Southeast Freeway, South Eastern Freeway, South East Freeway, or Southeast Expressway may refer to:

== Australia ==
- South Eastern Freeway, a freeway running southeast from Adelaide to Murray Bridge in South Australia, part of the national M1 route
- South Eastern Freeway, a freeway amalgamated with the Mulgrave Freeway to create the Monash Freeway, a freeway in Victoria, Australia
- Southeast Freeway, the first section of the Pacific Motorway (Brisbane–Brunswick Heads), opened in 1972, Queensland, Australia

== United States ==
- Southeast Freeway (Baltimore), a Maryland highway designated I-695 and MD 702
- Southeast Expressway (Massachusetts), designated I-93, US 1, and Route 3
- Southeast Freeway (Washington, D.C.), designated I-695, as well as an unbuilt extension into Maryland as the Southeast Expressway
