= To Find Happiness =

Studio album by Josh Pyke
- Released: 18 March 2022
- Length: 43:35
- Labels: Wonderlick; Sony
- Producer: Josh Pyke

Josh Pyke chronology
Missing Memories (2021)	To Find Happiness (2022)	Covers (2024)

Singles from To Find Happiness
- 1. "To Find Happiness" Released: 16 March 2021; 2. "The Hummingbird" Released: 10 June 2021; 3. "Your Heart Won't Always Weigh a Tonne" Released: 10 September 2021; 4. "Circle of Light" Released: 5. "If You Don't Know Me, Who Am I" Released: 13 January 2022

To Find Happiness is the seventh studio album by the Australian musician, Josh Pyke. The album was announced on 5 November 2021 alongside its fourth single "Circle of Light" and released on 18 March 2022. The album debuted at number 17 and is Pyke's eighth Top 50 album.

Upon announcement, Pyke said "This album was a bit of a surprise, I wasn't planning to make another record straight after Rome, but the juices were flowing, and I didn't want the 'COVID Years' to be defined by inactivity and stalled plans."

== Reception ==
Jeff Jenkins from Stack Magazine said "Pyke, the melody master, crafts pop songs that hit you right in the heart. Check out his track about identity and love, 'If You Don't Know Me, Who Am I?', a powerful and poignant piece inspired by his mum's battle with Alzheimer's. Then there's 'Your Heart Won't Always Weigh a Tonne', a salve to troubled times... A Josh Pyke album might not necessarily deliver happiness, but it will provide a perfect soundtrack for the search."

== Track listing ==
All tracks are written by Josh Pyke, except "That Light, That Glow" (written by Pyke and Wayne Connolly) and "The Hummingbird" (written by Pyke and Sophie Payten).

To Find Happiness track listing
No.	Title	Length
1.	"To Find Happiness"	1:57
2.	"Circle of Life"	3:47
3.	"The Hummingbird" (featuring Gordi)	3:30
4.	"A Town That You've Never Been To"	4:44
5.	"That Light, That Glow"	3:19
6.	"You Heart Won't Always Weigh a Tonne"	3:43
7.	"If You Don't Know Me, Who Am I"	4:31
8.	"The Fruit and the Tree"	2:53
9.	"Wake Up Kid"	4:26
10.	"What It Means to Be Alone (Catherine)"	10:45
Total length:		43:35

== Personnel ==
Credits are adapted from the album's liner notes.

- Josh Pyke – performance, production
- Glenn Hopper – piano (tracks 1, 4, 5, 8, 10), accordion (1)
- Elana Stone – accordion, vocals (2)
- Matt Fell – bass (2–4, 6, 8, 9), electric guitar (6)
- Josh Schuberth – drums, percussion (3, 4, 7–10)
- Freya Schack-Arnott – cello (3, 9, 10)
- Stephanie Zarka – stacked violins (4–6, 10)
- Jack Purdon – trumpet (4–6, 10)
- Dave Symes – double bass (7)
- Archie – vocals (4)
- Augie – vocals (4)
- Sarah – vocals (4)
- Beck Sykes – vocals (6)
- Gordi – vocals (3)
- Yolanda Kuhn – vocals (4)
- Wayne Connolly – production (5), mixing (1–5, 7–10)
- Chris Collins – mixing (6)
- Greg Calbi – mastering
- Jefferton James – album design
- Dimity Kennedy – photography

== Charts ==
Chart performance for To Find Happiness
Chart (2022)	Peak position
Australian Albums (ARIA)	17

== Release history ==
Release history and formats for To Find Happiness
Region	Date	Format	Label	Catalogue
Various	18 March 2022	CD; digital download; streaming	Wonderlick; Sony	LICK046
Australia	18 March 2022	LP	Wonderlick; Sony	LICK0467
