= Northeast Freeway =

The following roads are known as the Northeast Freeway or Northeast Expressway:

- Northeast Expressway (Atlanta), Georgia (I-85)
- Northeast Expressway (Baltimore), Maryland (I-95)
- Northeast Expressway (Boston), Massachusetts (US 1)
- Northeast Expressway (Cincinnati), Cincinnati, Ohio (I-71)
- Northeast Expressway (Philadelphia), Pennsylvania (unbuilt; would have been US 1)
- Northeastern Freeway (Columbia), South Carolina (SC 277)
- Northeast Freeway (Houston), Texas (US 90)
- Northeast Freeway (Washington, D.C.) (unbuilt)
- Pennsylvania Turnpike Northeast Extension
