= Feeding the Wolves (EP) =

EP by Josh Pyke
- Released: 8 November 2005
- Studio: SuperSonic, The Million & The Velvet studios, Sydney
- Label: Ivy League Records
- Producer: Wayne Connolly, Josh Pyke

Josh Pyke chronology
Recordings 2003-2005 (2005)	Feeding the Wolves (2005)	Memories & Dust (2007)

Singles from Feeding the Wolves
- 1. "Middle of the Hill" Released: July 2005; 2. "Private Education" Released: 2006

Feeding The Wolves is the third EP by Australian singer-songwriter Josh Pyke. It was released in November 2005 on Ivy League Records. The EP debuted on the ARIA Albums Chart on 6 February 2006 and peaked at number 64 two weeks later.

At the ARIA Music Awards of 2006, Feeding the Wolves was nominated for Best Pop Release.

In 2025, Pyke celebrated the 20th anniversary with a performance with the Adelaide Symphony Orchestra. It was released on Vinyl in October 2025.

== Track listing ==
No.	Title	Length
1.	"Beg Your Pardon"	2:32
2.	"Private Education"	3:23
3.	"Fill You In"	4:29
4.	"Goldmines"	4:56
5.	"Middle of the Hill"	2:27
6.	"Staring Down the Sun"	4:04
7.	"Feeding the Wolves"	4:33

== Charts ==
Chart performance for Feeding the Wolves
Chart (2005–2006)	Peak position
Australia (ARIA)	64

== Release history ==
Region	Date	Format	Label	Catalogue
Australia	8 November 2005	CD; digital download	Ivy League Records	IVY039
Australia	24 October 2025	LP	Mushroom Records	MUSH022LP
