= Freeways (video game) =

2017 simulation video game by Captain Games

- Developer: Captain Games
- Publisher: Captain Games
- Designer: Justin Smith
- Platforms: Microsoft Windows; macOS; Android; iOS
- Release: Android/iOS: September 2017; Steam: 1 October 2017
- Genre: Simulation
- Mode: Single-player

A player-created cloverleaf interchange

Freeways is a simulation video game developed and published by Canadian studio Captain Games. It was released for mobile in September 2017 and for Steam on 1 October 2017.

== Gameplay ==
Freeways simulates real-world traffic management. On each level the player is faced with dead-end roads that need to be connected to each other. The player must create roads and bridges by dragging across the screen to join these up in order to complete the level. If the cars get gridlocked, the word "Jammed!" pops up on the screen and the player can either modify the road or restart the level. Vehicle pathfinding in Freeways is not very advanced, leading to situations where the cars may take alternate routes to what the player intended.

At the end of each level, the level's "efficiency" is calculated from the flow of traffic, the amount of concrete used to make the roads, and the complexity of the system, with a higher score indicating a better-designed road network. The player has nine levels to start off with and more levels (up to 160 before the 2025 update) are unlocked as the game continues.

In 2025, a major update to the game was released, adding 80 new levels and the option to undo the previous move.

== Reception ==
The game's art style was compared to something from the Atari 2600 and was praised for its "rough-and-ready crudeness". The game has been compared to Cities: Skylines and Mini Metro.
