= Cuthbert and the Nightwalkers =

Australian pop band

- Origin: Newtown, New South Wales, Australia
- Genres: Pop, indie rock
- Members: Richard Cuthbert; Brendan Walsh; Dan Rooney; Irena Tasevska; Lauren Mckinnon; Giulia Polito; Nat Martin
- Past members: Dan Bishton

Cuthbert and the Nightwalkers are an Australian pop band from Newtown, New South Wales. They have released two albums and were winners of a Triple J Unearthed competition.

== Discography ==
- "Love Needs Us" (2007)
- "Mr Pickwick's Camera" (2009)

== Awards and nominations ==
=== J Award ===
The J Awards are an annual series of Australian music awards that were established by the Australian Broadcasting Corporation's youth-focused radio station Triple J. They commenced in 2005.

Year	Nominee / work	Award	Result
J Awards of 2007	themselves	Unearthed Artist of the Year	Nominated
