= Kingdom Within =

2026 album by Josh Pyke

Studio album by Josh Pyke
- Released: 12 June 2026
- Length: 48:48
- Label: ADA
- Producer: Chris Collins

Josh Pyke chronology
Josh Pyke Live with the Adelaide Symphony Orchestra (2026)	Kingdom Within (2026)

Singles from Kingdom Within
- 1. "Kingdom Within" Released: 13 March 2026; 2. "Under the Escarpment" Released: 17 April 2026; 3. "You're Doing Better Than You Think You Are" Released: 15 May 2026; 4. "Won't Be Heavy" Released: 12 June 2026

Kingdom Within is the eighth studio album by Australian musician Josh Pyke, released on 12 June 2026. The album was announced on 13 March 2026 alongside its lead single.

Upon announcement, the album was described as "a meditation on humanity's moral compass in an era shaped by technological change and social fragmentation."

Referring to the title track, Pyke said, "This song is really about reconnecting with your moral core. 'The Kingdom Within' I am referring to is our rich internal life. In a world that seems really fraught at the moment and really fragmented by not only what is going on in the political landscape but also in social media, I think it is more important than ever that we reconnect with what is important to us."

== Reception ==
Al Newstead from Double J said "Backed by tender guitar, verdant strings and hazy organ, the title track establishes the musical and conceptual palette of Kingdom Within... The optimistic 'You're Doing Better Than You Think You Are' reminds us not to be too hard on ourselves ... 'Under the Escarpment' and 'I Want' gift the album two charming, driving soft rock moments, while the harmonica-driven 'Priest or Politician' and 'Howlers' are tasteful stomp clap workouts."

HiFi Live called the album "career-defining, with clear messaging and emotion driving each song."

== Track listing ==
Kingdom Within track listing
No.	Title	Length
1.	"Kingdom Within"	4:09
2.	"Under the Escarpment"	3:47
3.	"Highway"	4:38
4.	"Sometimes Life Leaves More Than It Takes"	4:04
5.	"Priest or Politician"	3:21
6.	"Spring of All Things"	4:35
7.	"Won't Be Heavy" (featuring Missy Higgins)	2:58
8.	"Howlers"	3:22
9.	"I Want"	3:18
10.	"Magic"	5:11
11.	"You're Doing Better Than You Think You Are"	4:57
12.	"Bury My Money on the Farm"	4:28
Total length:		48:48

== Charts ==
Chart performance for Kingdom Within
Chart (2026)	Peak position
Australian Albums (ARIA)	6
