= Rome (Josh Pyke album) =

Studio album by Josh Pyke
- Released: 28 August 2020
- Length: 44:38
- Label: Josh Pyke; Wonderlick; Sony
- Producer: Josh Pyke

Josh Pyke chronology
The Best of Josh Pyke + B-Sides and Rarities (2018)	Rome (2020)	Revisions 2020 (2020)

Singles from Rome
- 1. "I Don't Know" Released: 17 March 2020; 2. "Doubting Thomas" Released: 17 April 2020; 3. "Home" Released: 22 May 2020; 4. "Don't Let It Wait" Released: 26 June 2020; 5. "You're My Colour" Released: 21 July 2020; 6. "I Thought We Were a River" Released: 28 August 2020

Rome is the sixth studio album by Australian musician, Josh Pyke. In a press statement in earlier 2020, Pyke said the title Rome refers to the expression that "all roads lead to Rome". The album was released on 28 August 2020.

A deeply personal album, Pyke touches on themes of love, loss, acceptance, doubt, anxiety, growth and what ‘home’ is, an aspect sure to resonate with fans and their perception of home given this current COVID-19 pandemic.

"Rome started as an album for me. As a way to process things I don't know how else to deal with. It's entered the world during a tough time for us all, but I don't want that to define this record. To say that it's been challenging releasing music during COVID is a big understatement, not just because of the difficulties we're all facing just being a day to day human being during this, not just because of the very real difficulties the music industry faces during this time, but also because as an artist, I'm in love with the art that I create, I think Rome is my best work, and I want it to flourish, to have a life of its own, and to reach as many people as possible."

== Reception ==
Professional ratings
Review scores
Source	Rating
Herald Sun	4/5 stars
Sungenre	2.5/5 stars

Cameron Adams from Herald Sun said "…it is up there with his finest work."

Tyler Jenke from ToneDeaf said "Fans of Josh Pyke have been hanging out for a new record from the indie icon for five years now, and in true style, his eagerly-anticipated return has been more than worth the wait. Kicking things off with the majestic 'Old Times' Sake', Pyke is fine form throughout the record, with his inimitable compositions proving not only why he's one of Australia’s most beloved artists, but also that five years is far too long to wait for another gorgeous record from Pyke."

Geordie Gray from ToneDeaf said "Pyke is back with his first album in five years, and what a welcome return it is. Rome sees Pyke take listeners on an intimate journey of self-reflection. 20 years into his career, he still sounds fresh as hell."

Jeff Jenkins from Stack Magazine said "Pyke has a knack for crafting melodies that will lift you out of your malaise, providing comfort and peace. And the album is tinged with optimism, with the Sydney singer declaring, 'I know that something good will come around again'".

Matt Marciniec from Sun Genre said "Josh Pyke's music is as safe and inoffensive as one can imagine. Rome will soothe the ear, but will hardly thrill engaged listeners. The pieces all fall too perfectly together to where the music lacks some of its essential flavouring. But Pyke feels perfectly content staying in his wheelhouse. Making perfectly vanilla singalongs is alright by him."

== Track listing ==
All tracks are written by Josh Pyke.

No.	Title	Length
1.	"Old Times' Sake"	3:49
2.	"Doubting Thomas"	4:08
3.	"I Thought We Were a River"	3:53
4.	"Home"	4:24
5.	"Still We Carry On"	2:43
6.	"Don't Let It Wait"	4:16
7.	"The Closing Eye"	4:20
8.	"You're My Colour"	4:20
9.	"I Don't KnOw"	2:04
10.	"Old Songs Now"	4:25
11.	"Where Goes the Girl"	6:16

== Charts ==
Chart performance of Rome
Chart (2020)	Peak position
Australian Albums (ARIA)	8

== Release history ==
Region	Date	Format	Label	Catalogue
Australia	28 August 2020	CD; LP; digital download; streaming	Josh Pyke, Wonderlick, Sony	LICK038
