= Only Sparrows =

Studio album by Josh Pyke
- Released: 19 August 2011
- Genre: Indie folk; adult contemporary
- Length: 53:30
- Label: Ivy League Records
- Producer: Wayne Connolly

Josh Pyke chronology
Chimney's Afire (2008)	Only Sparrows (2011)	The Beginning and the End of Everything (2013)

Singles from Only Sparrows
- 1. "No One Wants a Lover" Released: June 2011; 2. "The World Is a Picture" Released: 12 September 2011

Only Sparrows is the third studio album by Australian musician, Josh Pyke. It was released on the 19 of August 2011 by Ivy League Records and peaked at number 4 on the ARIA Charts.

At the ARIA Music Awards of 2012, the album was nominated for Best Adult Contemporary Album.

== Reception ==
Professional ratings
Review scores
Source	Rating
AllMusic	3/5 stars

Jon O'Brien from AllMusic said "Inspired by a soul-searching trip to New York, Sydney singer/songwriter Josh Pyke abandons his usual one-man band style of recording and for the first time, relinquishes some control to additional musicians... it's an approach which has resulted in a more expansive sound". O'Brien said "Opener 'Clovis Son' is a gorgeous fusion of gently strummed acoustics, twinkling glockenspiels, and dreamy West Coast harmonies which shows that his ability to tug at the heartstrings hasn't deserted him during his three-year solo absence, a quality also perfectly showcased on 'Punch in the Heart', a somber, stripped-back ballad featuring the ethereal vocals of Little Birdy's Katy Steele, while the melancholic 'Particles' begins with a brooding alt-rock hook before merging with an array of clattering rhythms and skittering synths on a surprisingly convincing attempt at folktronica."

== Track listing ==
No.	Title	Length
1.	"Clovis' Son"	5:12
2.	"Coffee Cups"	3:05
3.	"No One Wants a Lover"	3:23
4.	"The World Is a Picture"	3:34
5.	"Diet of Worms"	3:50
6.	"Punch in the Heart"	2:38
7.	"Break, Shatter, Make, Matter"	3:50
8.	"Good Head Start"	4:16
9.	"Factory Fires"	4:04
10.	"Particles"	4:13
11.	"Follow Me Down"	3:32
12.	"Love Lies"	5:22
13.	"Tapping on a Secret"	3:14
14.	"All Those Other Lives"	3:15

== Charts ==
Chart (2011)	Peak position
Australian Albums (ARIA)	4

== Release history ==
Region	Date	Format	Label	Catalogue
Australia	19 August 2011	CD; digital download	Ivy League Records	IVY115
