= Chimney's Afire =

Studio album by Josh Pyke
- Released: 4 October 2008
- Studio: Linear Recording Studios, Sydney
- Genre: Alternative rock, indie, pop rock
- Length: 45:02
- Label: Ivy League Records
- Producer: Josh Pyke, Wayne Connolly & Paul McKercher

Josh Pyke chronology
Beaks of Crows (2007)	Chimney's Afire (2008)	Only Sparrows (2011)

Singles from Chimney's Afire
- 1. "The Lighthouse Song" Released: August 2008; 2. "Make You Happy" Released: 9 November 2008; 3. "The Summer" Released: February 2009

Chimney's Afire is the second studio album by Australian singer-songwriter Josh Pyke. It was released in October 2008 and peaked at number 3 on the ARIA Charts and was certified gold.

At the ARIA Music Awards of 2009, the album was nominated for two awards, winning Best Adult Contemporary Album.

== Reception ==
Professional ratings
Review scores
Source	Rating
AllMusic	2.5/5 stars

AllMusic said "Chimney's Afire is ironically anything but afire, with decidedly safe music throughout. Pyke doesn't quite sound like anyone else, to his credit, but the music is strangely familiar and formulaic at the same time. There's a careful composition skill at work in the creation of these pieces, that makes ballads and pop ditties with equal aplomb and yet refuses to stand out at all from the other songs, or from other music on the market. Just a couple of tracks hold any reasonable energy – 'Make You Happy' which holds a bit of mid-'90s American contemporary rock to it, and 'You Don't Scare Me' which starts out with a thumping Ramones-style beat, but moves into a silky vocal line, something that Jonathan Coulton might have used in a parody of contemporary music. There's serious ability within Pyke's work, and yet the execution provides nothing of lasting impact. Use it for excellent ambient background music, but don't expect to be blown away."

== Track listing ==
No.	Title	Length
1.	"Chimney's Afire"	1:22
2.	"You Don't Scare Me"	3:40
3.	"The Summer"	3:25
4.	"The Lighthouse Song"	3:46
5.	"Candle in Your Window"	3:15
6.	"Variations"	2:53
7.	"Make You Happy"	2:57
8.	"Our House Breathing"	3:09
9.	"Even in Corners"	2:43
10.	"Don't Wanna Let You Down"	3:41
11.	"Parking Lots"	2:57
12.	"Eat Me Alive"	3:51
13.	"New Year's Song"	3:51
14.	"Where Two Oceans Meet"	3:33

== Charts ==
Chart (2008/09)	Peak position
Australian Albums (ARIA)	3

== Certification ==
Region	Certification	Certified units/sales
Australia (ARIA)	Gold	35,000^{^}
^{^} Shipments figures based on certification alone.

== Release history ==
Region	Date	Format	Label	Catalogue
Australia	4 October 2008	CD; digital download	Ivy League Records	IVY072
