= Freeway (band) =

Dutch rock band

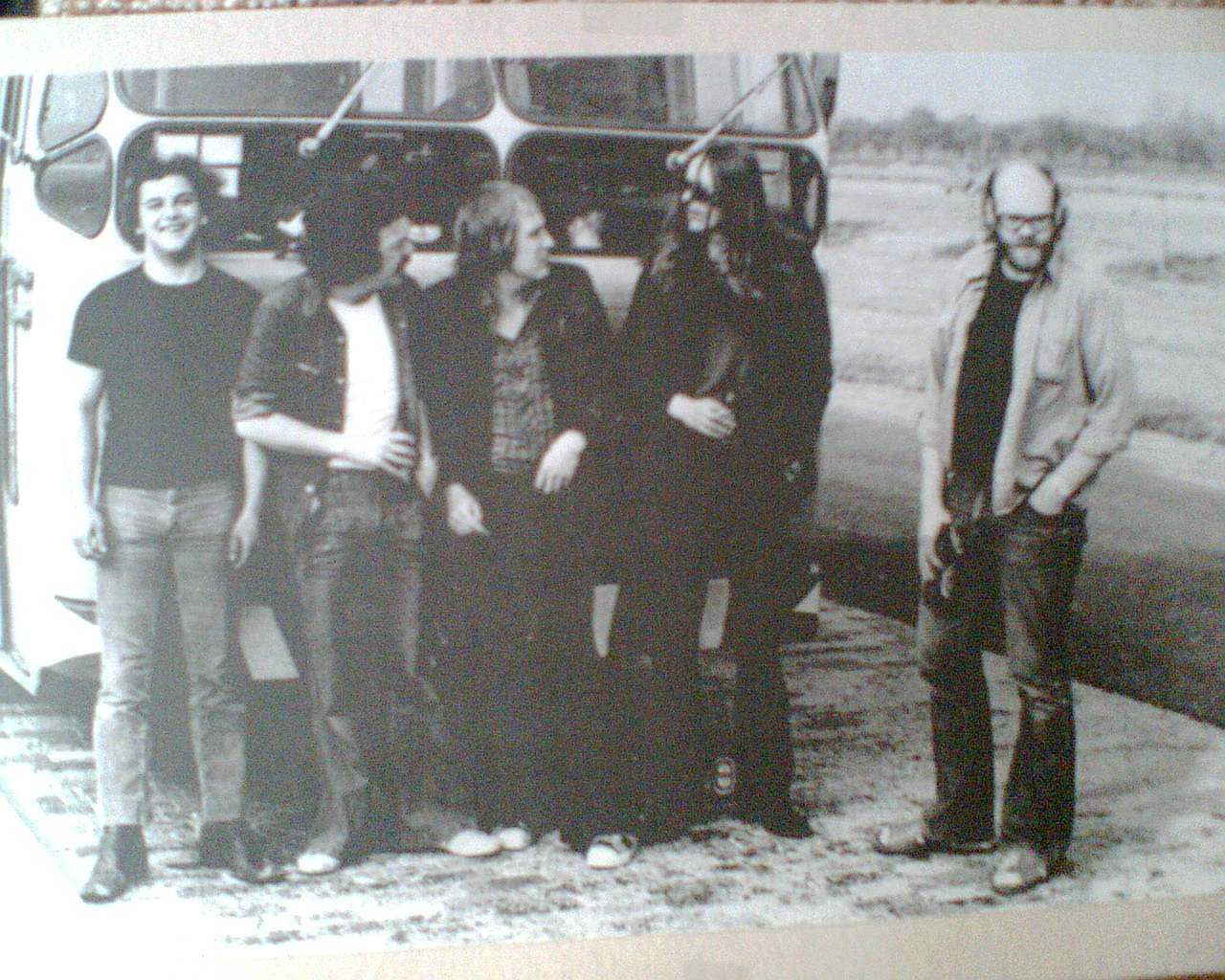
For transport they used an old autobus. From left to right Kees Spierings (rhythm guitar), Jaap Dekker (drums), George Legierse (lead singer), Gert Kuiter (bass guitar), Hans van Hamersveld (lead guitar)

Freeway is a Dutch rock group from Amersfoort, founded by Wim Bos (bass player) and Dick Visser (drums) on 1 March 1968. Their rock & roll-like style of music is broadly comparable to the Rolling Stones. The founding musicians were:

- Dick Visser - drums and lead singer
- Wim Bos - bass guitar
- Elly van Zoelen - singer
- Roy Driessen - rhythm guitar
- Gijs Westerning - lead guitar

By adding a new lead singer George Legierse and replacement of both guitarists Gijs and Roy by Hans van Hamersveld the band was becoming better known outside the region of Utrecht.

== History ==
During their early years the band played abroad, typically for the British Forces in Germany. They played many English songs, like the Rolling Stones, the Beatles and Them.

Over the years, many changes in the band's lineup has occurred, but Legierse and Van Hamersveld have been at the core of the band.

At George's 50th birthday, Hans had arranged a drummer, which George didn't recognise until he had begun to speak. The drummer was revealed to be Dick Visser.

In 2006 Susan Langeveld joined the band for a short time. That was a chance to add some different style music. Jimi Hendrix, Joe Walsh and Susan Tedeschi songs were added.

The band collapsed in September 2006, which caused George to be left alone as only member of this band. In September 2007 George did gather the two guitarists from the band SHOCKPROOF (coverband), together with Ronnie Defilé (played about 15 years ago in Freeway). His father, Joop Defilé, once replaced Hans van Hamersveld, when he broke his hip. Theo, who had also left for almost a year, returned again and after five rehearsals the band had the courage to do a tryout on November 17. This was also the celebration of the 40 years that the band exists. More than 30 people visited this reunion, among them some former musicians of the band. Paaik, one of the three brothers of George, was invited to join on stage to sing some lyrics.

During this celebration the momentarely musicians where:

- George Legierse - lead singer
- Jos van den Hoven - guitar, sax, bluesharp
- Willem van Doezelaar - guitar
- Theo van Marsbergen - bass guitar (left band for 12 months but returned)
- Ronnie Defilé - drums

On 18 June 2010 Band Lifepak (with singer Paaik Legierse) played together with Freeway in Café De Noot in Hoogland, where international artists regularly do their performances. See http://www.denoot.nl

George, who had some voice problems, recovered and the more he sang, the better his voice sounded. Both George and Hans have retired from working, but Theo and Marcel have still daily jobs beside the band.

After 48 years (going for the 50) at this moment on stage (2016 at Kingsday 27 April):

- George Legierse - lead singer
- Hans van Hamersveld - guitar
- Theo van Marsbergen - bass guitar
- Marcel Gunsing - drums
