= Afro Moses =

Ghanaian musical artist

- Also known as: African James Brown
- Born: Ernest Sarfo Baidoo; Wassa, Atieku, Western Region
- Origin: Ghanaian
- Genres: afrobeat; highlife; reggea
- Occupations: singer; songwriter; performer
- Years active: 1980s - present
- Website: afromoses.com.ua

Afro Moses (born Ernest Sarfo Baidoo) is a well-known Ghanaian-Australian musician and multi-instrumentalist who is noted for fusing traditional African music with current sounds. He was named Ghana's Best International Music Ambassador at the Ghana Music Awards in 2002. He was also awarded the Lifetime Achievement Award at the 2018 Ghana Music Awards held in the UK.

== Early Life and musical career ==
He was born and raised in Wassa Atieku, Ghana's Western Region. As the first of his mother's four children, he began his musical career at a young age by making instruments and performing.

He has won several awards, such as Best Song, Best Album, and Best Live Act. In 2000 and 2002, he was chosen as Ghana's Best International Music Ambassador. He headlined the "Asa Baako" (One Dance) festival at Busua Beach in the Western Region of Ghana alongside rapper M.anifest. He has performed on stage with a variety of musicians, including Gyedu Blay Ambolley and Atongo Zimba. He urged Shata Wale and Samini to end their fight. He expressed worry over the royalties paid by the Ghana Music Right Organization (GHAMRO).

"I used the royalties I got abroad to buy land and build a house abroad. Don't even raise that issue. If I decided to deal with them GHAMRO, it would be an issue, so I don't want to talk about it. I was given GH¢100. And another time I was given GH¢2,000, even that one I haven't touched till now because I've reserved it to do something With the number of my songs that have been played in Ghana, I'm supposed to earn a lot." — Afro Moses

== Discography ==
Albums

- Afro Dance Pop (2019)
- I Want 2 B Happy (2019)
- Africa Will Smile One Day (2019)
- Ole Skou (2021)
- Spirit(Live in Bali Spirit Festival) (2022)
- Yele Yele (2022)
- Mefri medi biriwa (Atieku) (2023)

Singles

- Debi
- No Victims
- Do Me Wrong
- Mama Africa
- Ka ne Wu
- Home Sweet Home
- Judas
- African Market Makola
- Yele Yele
- Dabi Nsroma
- Nsama
- Nice Girl
- Highlife Carnival

== Awards and Recognition ==
Year	Oganaziation	Award	Work	Result	Ref
2002	Ghana Music Awards	Best International Music Ambassador	Himself	Honoured	
2018	Ghana Music Awards UK	Lifetime Achievement	Himself	Honoured	
