= No One Wants a Lover =

Single by Josh Pyke

from the album Only Sparrows
- Released: 20 June 2011
- Length: 3:20
- Label: Ivy League Records
- Songwriter: Josh Pyke
- Producers: Wayne Connolly, Josh Pyke

Josh Pyke singles chronology
| "The Summer" (2009) | "No One Wants a Lover" (2011) | "Throw It Away" (2011) |

Music video
- "No One Wants a Lover" on YouTube

"No One Wants a Lover" is a song by Australian singer-songwriter Josh Pyke. It was released in June 2011 as the lead single from Pyke's third studio album, Only Sparrows (2011). Pyke promoted the song with television and radio appearances.

At the ARIA Music Awards of 2011, the song was nominated for three awards; Best Male Artist and with Wayne Connolly, Producer of the Year and Engineer of the Year.

== Reception ==
In an album review, Jon O'Brien from AllMusic liked the "'wooh-ooh' harmonies and infectious handclaps of the driving country-rock" song. Larry Heath of The AU Review said he "enjoys" the song.

== Charts ==
Chart performance for "No One Wants a Lover"
| Chart (2011) | Peak position |
|---|---|
| Australia (ARIA) | 139 |
