= But for All These Shrinking Hearts =

Studio album by Josh Pyke
- Released: 31 July 2015
- Recorded: Timshel Industries, Sony Music Studios, Albert Studios
- Length: 44:08 (Standard) 51:53 (Deluxe)
- Labels: Wonderlick, Sony
- Producer: John Castle

Josh Pyke chronology
The Beginning and the End of Everything (2013)	But for All These Shrinking Hearts (2015)	Live at the Sydney Opera House (2016)

Singles from But for All These Shrinking Hearts
- 1. "Hollering Hearts" Released: June 2015; 2. "Be Your Boy" Released: February 2016

But for All These Shrinking Hearts is the fifth studio album by Australian musician, Josh Pyke. It was his first on new label Wonderlick Entertainment and released in July 2015. The album peaked at number 2 on the ARIA Charts.

The album's title came from a line of poetry Pyke jotted down while on tour in London for his last album: "You are a shadow held aloft in a world less vast but for all these shrinking hearts". Pyke said he wrote it feeling disillusioned with the world saying "It feels like everyone's hearts are shrinking a bit, at a time when we should be more open hearted".

== Reception ==
James Di Fabrizio from Beat Magazine said the album found Pyke "in the middle ground between consolidating and experimenting with his lyrically illustrative and classically melodic style." Di Fabrizio said "Lyrically, much of the album deals with Pyke's relationship with creativity and his longstanding pursuit of it."

Elisa Parry from Music Feeds said "While But for All These Shrinking Hearts has everything you'd want from a Josh Pyke album – intricate melodies, exquisite harmonies and choruses that will worm their way into your head after just one listen – there's also a whole lot more going on here." and concluded the review saying "Like all good songs, the stories will stay with you and get you thinking. Thematically it all comes back to the idea of motion, of moving forward creatively, personally and as a society. But don't worry; if you were just hanging out for a few more love songs, you won't be disappointed."

== Track listing ==
All tracks are written by Josh Pyke.

No.	Title	Writer(s)	Length
1.	"Book of Revelations"		5:06
2.	"Songlines"	Josh Pyke, Marcus Azon	3:45
3.	"Late Night Driving"		3:30
4.	"There's a Line"		3:36
5.	"Momentary Glow"	Josh Pyke, Dustin Tebbutt	3:54
6.	"Hollering Hearts"		3:21
7.	"Still Some Big Deal"		4:06
8.	"Be Your Boy"		4:43
9.	"When Your Colours Go"		4:42
10.	"Doing What You're Told"		4:40
11.	"Someone To Rust With"		2:45
12.	"Sound of Us" (deluxe edition only)		4:37
13.	"Life Of Labour" (deluxe edition only)		3:08

- all songs written by Josh Pyke unless noted.

== Charts ==
Chart (2015)	Peak position
Australian Albums (ARIA)	2

== Release history ==
Region	Date	Format	Label	Catalogue
Australia	31 July 2015	CD; LP; digital download; streaming	Wonderlick, Sony	LICK011
