= Lines on Palms =

Single by Josh Pyke

from the album Memories & Dust
- Released: 3 March 2007
- Genre: Alternative rock
- Length: 3:02
- Label: Ivy League Records
- Songwriter(s): Josh Pyke
- Producer(s): Wayne Connolly, Josh Pyke

Josh Pyke singles chronology
| "Memories & Dust" (2006) | "Lines on Palms" (2007) | "Fed & Watered" (2007) |

Music video
- "Lines on Palms" on YouTube

"Lines on Palms" is a song by Australian singer-songwriter Josh Pyke. It was released in March 2007 as the second single from Pyke's debut studio album, Memories & Dust. The song peaked at number 33, becoming Pyke's highest charting single.

== Track listing ==
| No. | Title | Length |
|---|---|---|
| 1. | "Lines on Palms" | 3:02 |
| 2. | "Sleepers to Steel" | 2:52 |
| 3. | "House at Pooh's Corner" | 2:43 |

== Charts ==
| Chart (2007) | Peak position |
|---|---|
| Australia (ARIA) | 33 |
