= The Beginning and the End of Everything =

Studio album by Josh Pyke
- Released: 5 July 2013
- Studio: Alberts (Sydney); The Shed (Melbourne)
- Genre: Indie folk; adult contemporary
- Length: 36:39
- Label: Ivy League
- Producer: John Castle; Josh Pyke

Josh Pyke chronology
Only Sparrows (2011)	The Beginning and the End of Everything (2013)	But for All These Shrinking Hearts (2015)

Singles from The Beginning and the End of Everything
- 1. "Leeward Side" Released: May 2013; 2. "Warm in Winter" Released: July 2013

The Beginning and the End of Everything is the fourth studio album by Australian alternative rock musician, Josh Pyke. It was released on 5 July 2013 by Ivy League Records and peaked at number seven on the ARIA albums chart. At the ARIA Music Awards of 2013 it was nominated for Best Adult Contemporary Album.

== Background ==
Australian alternative rock musician Josh Pyke issued his fourth studio album, The Beginning and the End of Everything, on 5 July 2013 via Ivy League Records. It debuted and peaked at number seven on the ARIA albums chart and is his fourth consecutive album to reach the top ten. Pyke co-produced the work with John Castle, besides Pyke on lead vocals session musicians include Kieran Conrau on horn, Ben Edgar on guitars (baritone, electric, lap steel), Ross Irwin on horn and Holly Throsby on vocals. At the ARIA Music Awards of 2013 it was nominated for Best Adult Contemporary Album.

== Track listing ==
All tracks are written by Joshua Jon Pyke, unless otherwise noted

No.	Title	Length
1.	"Bug Eyed Beauty"	1:44
2.	"The Beginning and the End of Everything"	3:49
3.	"Leeward Side" (Pyke, Michael David Rosenberg)	2:46
4.	"Haunt You Love"	2:25
5.	"Warm in Winter"	4:17
6.	"All the Very Best of Us" (Pyke, Holly Sarah Throsby)	3:11
7.	"Feet of Clay"	3:14
8.	"Horse's Head"	4:08
9.	"Order Has Abandoned Us"	2:39
10.	"White Lines Dancing"	4:54
11.	"Stories That Get Told"	3:32
Total length:		36:39

== Charts ==
Chart (2013)	Peak position
Australian Albums (ARIA)	7

== Release history ==
Region	Date	Format	Label	Catalogue
Australia	5 July 2013	CD; CD+DVD; LP; digital download	Ivy League Records	IVY183 /631841648
