= The Paper Scissors =

Australian musical group

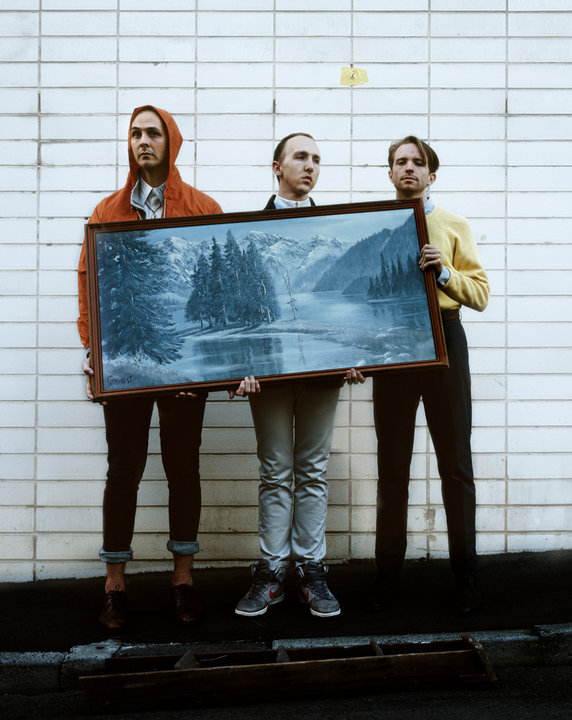
- Left to right: Jai Pyne, Ivan Lisyak and Xavier Naughton

Background information
- Origin: Sydney, New South Wales, Australia
- Genres: Indie rock, indie pop
- Years active: 2005–2012
- Labels: Our First Label, Sandcastle Music, Dramatico Publishing
- Past members: Jai Pyne; Xavier Naughton; Ivan Lisyak; Bryce Stacker; Tom Hespe

The Paper Scissors were an Australian rock band who were active between 2005 and 2012. The last line-up consisted of Jai Pyne, Xavier Naughton and Ivan Lisyak. Their sound was described as "a combination of garage-punk, rock and soul". Australian music site Polaroids of Androids described them as "undoubtedly one of Sydney's finest bands of the past decade"

== The Paper Scissors EP ==
The band released a self-titled EP in 2006 on their independent label Our First Label, which was distributed by MGM distribution. The lead track "We Don't Walk" was picked up by Sydney Community FBi Radio and by national broadcaster Triple J. "We Don't Walk" has since been used on the Underbelly on the Nine Network, as well as on an advertisement for Unwired Australia, an internet service provider.

== Less Talk More Paper Scissors LP and the years after ==
The band released their debut album Less Talk More Paper Scissors (LTMPS) in 2007 on Our First Label. The album was well received by the Australian press, The Sydney Magazine featured it as album of the month in September 2007. Lead single "Yamanote Line" which takes its name from a train line in Tokyo, Japan was described by Sacha Molitorisz as "the best song ever written. Truly" and received high rotation on Triple J. Yamanote Line was also broadcast on BBC 6. LTMPS also featured the song "Tipped Hat", which was featured on a Riva Coffee commercial. Richard Kingsmill mentioned the band's use of advertising stating "it’s a huge revenue stream – it’s huge exposure" in an article in Tsunami Magazine, a Brisbane publication.

The band were also asked to host and program Rage, the ABC Television's music video show.

In 2008, the band were asked to cover a song of their choice for The Rewind Project which was initiated by Buffet Libre, a group of Spanish DJs. They covered Hall & Oates' 1981 song "I Can't Go for That (No Can Do)".

== Touring ==
After the release of LTMPS, the band promoted the album extensively, touring throughout Australia. They played numerous festivals such as Parklife Festival, The Playground Weekender Festival, Southbound, St Kilda Festival, The Great Escape and Falls Festival. In 2008 they embarked on a national co-headline tour with fellow Sydney act bluejuice.

== Howl and "T-T-Time" ==
In June 2009, the band released the Howl EP, which featured two original Paper Scissors songs as well as remixes by Sydney artists The E.L.F (Darren Cross from Gerling), Cleptocleptics and Spod. The title track "Howl" received high rotation airplay on Triple J. "T-T-Time" was released digitally only in November 2009, and received high rotation airplay on Triple J, and its accompanying video clip was indie clip of the week on ABC TV's Rage program.

== In Loving Memory and "Lung Sum" ==
In December 2009, The Paper Scissors mentioned in a blog post on their official Myspace that "We are approaching the beginnings of the end of our second album, getting down overdubs and the fancy bits". In April 2010, they posted on their Twitter a list of studios used for In Loving Memory and on their official Facebook fan page they mentioned "They are almost finished their second album which is called In Loving Memory". Early in 2010 the band signed a publishing deal with Dramatico Publishing, a New York-based publisher.
The band released "Lung Sum" in October 2010. "Lung Sum" was the first official single taken from In Loving Memory. The film clip was featured as 'indie clip of the week' on ABC TV's Rage In February 2011, Jai Pyne mentioned recording credits in an interview with an Australian music website, The Au Review, stating that British engineer/producer Tom McFall is just finishing off the mixes as we speak in London" as well as stating the band were having the album mastered in London "at the Exchange, with Mike Marsh". McFall has previously worked with UK rock band Bloc Party, and Canadian indie rock group Stars.

== In Loving Memory critical reception ==
In Loving Memory was released on 17 June 2011 and has been critically acclaimed by both Australian and overseas media:

"In Loving Memory is a feat of originality and discipline" Brag Magazine (Aus)

"One of the most indisputably forward thinking albums of 2011" Stereoboard (UK)

"In Loving Memory is a revelation. I am not overly familiar with The Paper Scissors, and what I assumed would be a slightly better than average album has been one of my favorites of 2011" Indie Shuffle (U.S)
The album was featured as Album of The Week on Sydney's influential FBi Radio as well as receiving regular airplay on Californian StationKCRW which is considered "one of the most influential independent music radio stations around the globe"KCRW Wiki.

== Free EP and disbanding ==
The band released an EP for a free download through their website in May 2012. It was titled 'Free' and it was accompanied by four music videos by Sydney-based artists. The video clip for "Held Down Threw Up" debuted on ABC TV's music program, Rage, on 17 August 2012. The band announced through their official Twitter account "here's some news - its gonna be our second last show ever." on Tuesday 28 August. They posted an official statement on 29 August on their website stating reasons for the breaking up including "Sometimes it’s pretty tiring being in a band. I know to people that haven’t ever been in a band that might sound a bit self piteous and indulgent, but it is hard. Playing to no one, having higher expectations for your music than what is met, the fact that it is nearly impossible to make it a career in Australia as a musician (it is a big big country, with not many people and one very fickle national radio station) all these things can grate away at you."

They announced that they would play one last show in Sydney before the end of 2012.

== Since disbanding ==
Since The Paper Scissors disbanded- members Jai Pyne and Ivan Lisyak have remained active in the music scene in Sydney. Ivan Lisyak has played with Philadelphia Grand Jury, Tanned Christ, Jack Colwell, Post Paint and Marcus Whale, as well as making music as HVISKE with Sydney artist/singer Kusum Normoyle. Jai Pyne formed a record label called Turktown with fellow musician and producer Caleb Jacobs and released a solo EP called 'Jaisus' in 2015. He also composes music for film and television and started a cafe called Fleetwood Macchiato

== Awards ==
1. 2007 Spirit of Youth Award Shortlist
2. 2010 International Songwriting Competition Finalist
