= The Summer (Josh Pyke song) =

Single by Josh Pyke

from the album Chimney's Afire
- Released: February 2009
- Length: 3:23
- Label: Ivy League Records
- Songwriter: Josh Pyke
- Producers: Wayne Connolly, Josh Pyke

Josh Pyke singles chronology
"Make You Happy"" (2008)	"The Summer" (2009)	"No One Wants a Lover" (2011)

Music video
- "The Summer" on YouTube

"The Summer" is a song by Australian singer-songwriter Josh Pyke. It was released in February 2009 as the third and final single from Pyke's second studio album, Chimney's Afire (2008). In the song Pyke weaves stories from childhood memories and idyllic dreams of a life by the sea. It was certified gold in Australia in 2020.

== Charts ==
Chart performance for "This Summer"
Chart (2009)	Peak position
Australia (ARIA)	177

== Certification ==
Region	Certification	Certified units/sales
Australia (ARIA)	Gold	35,000^{‡}
^{‡} Sales+streaming figures based on certification alone.
