= Memories & Dust (song) =

Single by Josh Pyke

from the album Memories & Dust
- Released: October 2006
- Studio: NikiNali Studios
- Genre: Alternative rock
- Length: 3:05
- Label: Ivy League Records
- Songwriter(s): Josh Pyke
- Producer(s): Wayne Connolly, Josh Pyke

Josh Pyke singles chronology
"Private Education" (2006)	"Memories & Dust" (2006)	"Lines on Palms" (2007)

Music video
- "Memories & Dust" on YouTube

"Memories & Dust" is a song by Australian singer-songwriter Josh Pyke. It was released in October 2006 as the lead single from Pyke's debut studio album, Memories & Dust (2007). The song peaked at number 39 on the ARIA Charts.

== Track list ==
IVY049
No.	Title	Length
1.	"Memories & Dust"	3:05
2.	"Drop in the Stitch"	3:33
3.	"Clock On / Clock Off"	5:16

== Charts ==
Chart (2006)	Peak position
Australia (ARIA)	39
