= Middle of the Hill =

Single by Josh Pyke

from the album Feeding the Wolves
- Released: July 2005
- Length: 2:27
- Label: Ivy League Records
- Songwriter(s): Josh Pyke
- Producer(s): Wayne Connolly, Josh Pyke

Josh Pyke singles chronology
"The Doldrums" (2004)	"Middle of the Hill" (2005)	"Private Education" (2006)

Music video
- "Middle of the Hill" on YouTube

"Middle of the Hill" is a song by Australian singer-songwriter Josh Pyke. It was released in July 2005 as the lead single from Pyke's third extended play, Feeding the Wolves (2005). The song has become a "fan-favourite" and was polled at number 19 in the Triple J Hottest 100, 2005.

Pyke said "The writing of 'Middle of the Hill' was one of those times that I've read about; it's called 'the flow', you know, where you're in this state of creativity where you're not really aware of what you're doing, very stream-of-consciousness. That song, I literally wrote it in about as long as it takes to sing it. I had the riff and I was playing it, and I just kind of opened my mouth and all this stuff poured out. I think it was partly because I'd moved back home at that point, so I was reflecting on family and what it means to be part of a family and living in a family."

At the APRA Music Awards of 2007, the song was nominated for Most Performed Blues and Roots Work.

== Track listings ==
1 track single
No.	Title	Length
1.	"Middle of the Hill"	2:27

CD single (725624)
No.	Title	Length
1.	"Middle of the Hill"	3:05
2.	"Drop in the Stitch"	3:33

7" single (1725625)
No.	Title	Length
1.	"Middle of the Hill"	3:05
2.	"Fed & Watered"	3:55
