= Josh Pyke =

Australian singer-songwriter (born 1977)

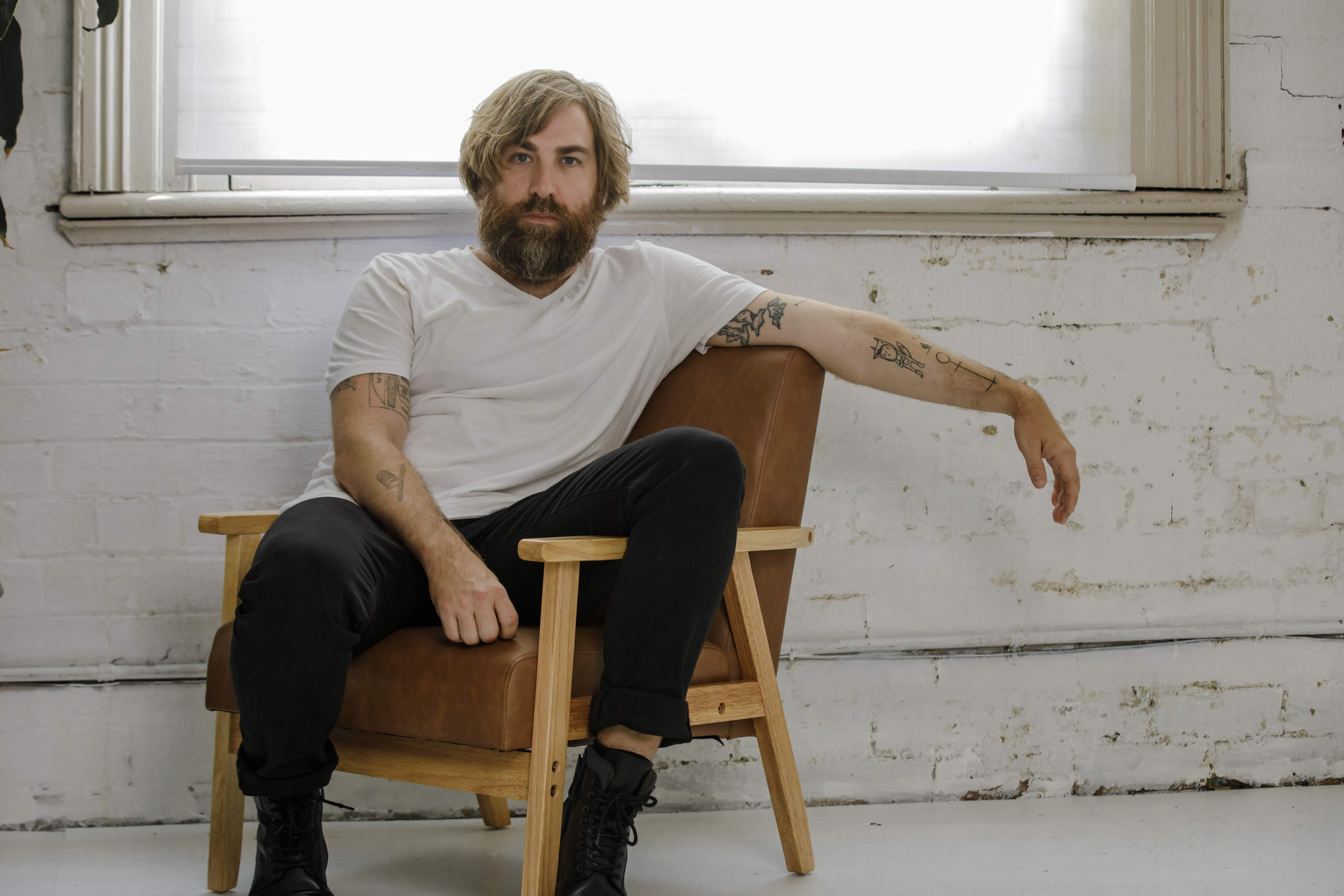
- Pyke in 2020

Background information
- Also known as: Josh Pyke
- Born: Joshua Jon Pyke; 18 December 1977 (age 48); Sydney, New South Wales, Australia
- Genre: Indie folk
- Instruments: Vocals, guitar
- Years active: 2000–present
- Labels: Ivy League (2005–2015); Wonderlick Entertainment (2015–2024); ADA (2025-present)
- Website: www.joshpyke.com

Joshua Jon Pyke (born 18 December 1977) is an Australian singer-songwriter, producer, musician and children's book author.

== Music career ==
=== 2003–2004: Early EPs and Night Hour ===
Josh Pyke was in his first band by age 12 and played his first performance in front of 650 parents and students at his primary school graduation. Playing guitar and initial song writing efforts came aged 14. Despite his aptitude for song writing and performance, he stayed 'under the radar' throughout his high school years at Fort Street High School.

While part of Sydney band An Empty Flight he successfully applied for a grant from the Music Board of the Australia Council under the Buzz Project to remix a number of his own demo recordings to be released as an EP Current Works Volume 1, under the name of Night Hour. The lead track, "Kids Don't Sell Their Hopes So Fast", received wide-ranging radio airplay on national youth broadcaster triple j and on various community radio stations including 3RRR in Melbourne and Fbi in Sydney. In 2004 Pyke won the Jaxter Music Award for his single "Kids Don't Sell Their Hopes So Fast". The proceeds went towards a home studio. A second EP titled The Doldrums was released in November 2004.

=== 2005–2006: Early EPs as Josh Pyke ===
In 2005, Pyke signed to Australian indie label Ivy League Records and in September 2005 released the EP Feeding the Wolves, the first under his own name. It features the singles "Middle of the Hill" and "Private Education" and peaked at number 64 on the ARIA Charts. In January 2006, "Middle of the Hill" was voted at number 19 in the Triple J Hottest 100, 2005.

In 2006, Pyke spent a month in New York, writing and performing before touring the UK for the first time in support of Feeding the Wolves. In October 2006, the song "Memories & Dust" was released which peaked at number 39 on the ARIA Charts.

=== 2007–2009: Memories & Dust and Chimney's Afire ===
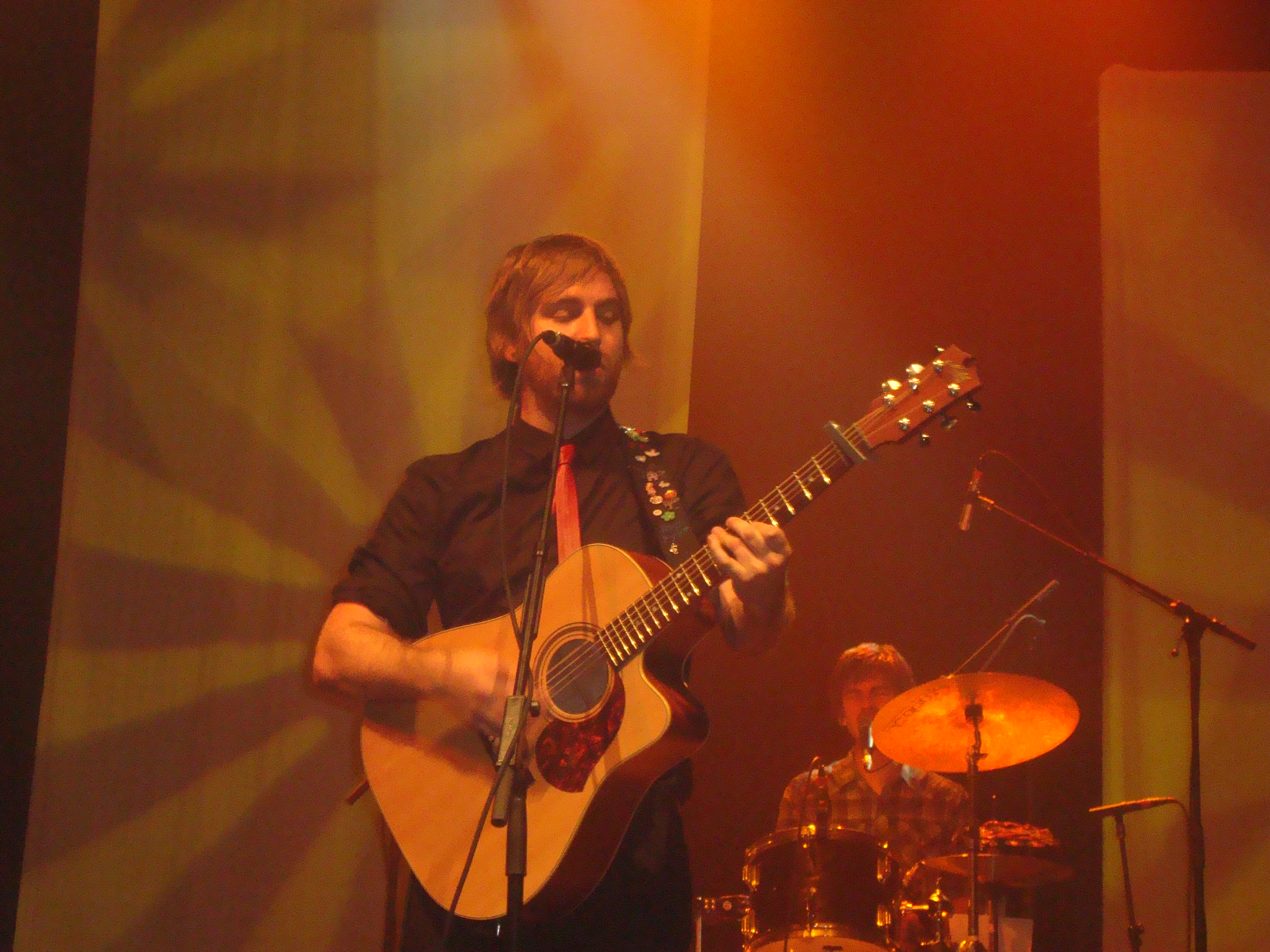
Pyke performing in 2009.

Josh Pyke released his debut studio album, Memories & Dust on 10 March 2007. It debuted at number 4 on ARIA Charts. Lead singles "Memories & Dust" and "Lines on Palms" peaked within the ARIA top 50. At the ARIA Music Awards of 2007, the album was nominated for five awards, winning three.

Pyke recorded a cover version of "Wuthering Heights" by Kate Bush for the No Man's Woman album which was released in 2007.

In 2008, Pyke and Michael Yezerski won the APRA award for Best Original Song Composed for the Screen for "When We Get There", from the film The Black Balloon.

In October 2008, Pyke's second studio album Chimney's Afire was released. It debuted at number 3 on the ARIA charts, and number 1 on the ARIA Australian Album Chart.

In August 2009, he played a series of concerts where The Beatles' White Album was played from start to finish with Tim Rogers, Chris Cheney and Phil Jamieson. The tour was extended due to popular demand.

At the ARIA Music Awards of 2009, Chimney's Afire was nominated for two awards, winning Best Adult Contemporary Album.

=== 2010: Basement Birds ===
In mid-2009, Pyke formed the Australian indie pop rock group Basement Birds with Kevin Mitchell (of Jebediah, aka Bob Evans), Steve Parkin (ex-Vinyl, Autopilot, solo) and Kavyen Temperley (of Eskimo Joe). The group released a self-titled studio album in July 2010, which peaked at number 12 on the ARIA charts.

=== 2011–2012: Only Sparrows ===
In January 2011 Pyke spent a month in New York to finish writing the album that was to become Only Sparrows. On return he recorded the album with ARIA Award-winning producer Wayne Connolly and it was released 19 August 2011. The album debuted at number 4 on the ARIA Charts.

In October 2011, Pyke toured the UK, this time on a co-headline tour with friend and occasional collaborator Mike Rosenberg AKA Passenger. While touring, the pair collaborated on new material, which resulted in Passenger having writing credits on "Leeward Side" and Josh having writing credits on "27". At the ARIA Music Awards of 2011, Only Sparrows was nominated for three awards.

Pyke concluded 2011 playing at the 2011/2012 Falls Festivals in Victoria and Tasmania before heading to Southbound Festival in Western Australia. In February 2012 he performed "Love Lies" and a cover of The Jezabels' "Endless Summer" featuring Elana Stone on triple j's Like a Version. The song was included on the Like a Version Volume 8.

In 2012, Pyke joined a cast of Australian musicians to launch a campaign to support peers who have hit hard times. The campaign was called Support Act for which Pyke became an ambassador, featuring in the TV commercial—"Not everyone in the music industry is able to lead a comfortable life when the music stops playing".

=== 2013–2014: The Beginning and the End of Everything ===
On 6 July 2013, Pyke released his fourth studio album, The Beginning and the End of Everything, which debuted at number 7 on the ARIA Chart. The release was followed by a sold out national tour. At the ARIA Music Awards of 2013, the album was nominated for Best Adult Contemporary Album.

Pyke spent much of 2014 travelling Australia for his three Lone Wolf tours (Lone Wolf Tour, Lone Wolf Regional Tour and Last of the Lone Wolf Tour).

In July 2014, Pyke joined Phil Jamieson (Grinspoon), Chris Cheney (The Living End) and Tim Rogers (You Am I) for the second time to tour Australia on The White Album Concert tour. Both the 2009 and 2014 tours were completely sold out and extended due to popular demand.

=== 2015–2016: But for All These Shrinking Hearts and Live at the Sydney Opera House ===
In April 2015, Pyke collaborated with the Sydney Symphony Orchestra for two specially curated shows at the iconic Sydney Opera House. Pyke spent three months working with ten up-and-coming composers redesigning his songs for the shows. Following the success of these performances, Pyke brought the show to the Perth Concert Hall and performed it with the West Australian Symphony Orchestra in July 2015.

On 31 July 2015 Josh Pyke released his fifth studio album, But for All These Shrinking Hearts, which debuted at number 2 on the ARIA charts. It was his first release on new label Wonderlick Entertainment, distributed by Sony. In conjunction with the release, Pyke played four sold out intimate Fans First shows around Australia. He then sold-out shows at Melbourne Zoo and Taronga Zoo in Sydney on his capital city tour. Pyke appeared the 2015 Woodword Folk Festival and the Falls Music & Arts Festival.

Pyke's performance at the Sydney Opera House in 2015, was released in July 2016 and peaked at number 27. At the ARIA Music Awards of 2016, the album won the ARIA Award for Best Original Soundtrack, Cast or Show Album.

=== 2017–2020: The Best of Josh Pyke and Rome ===
In May 2017, Pyke announced the release of his first greatest hits album, The Best of Josh Pyke, alongside new single "Into the Wind". The album was released on 30 June 2017.

In March 2020, Pyke released "I Don't Know", the lead single from his sixth studio album, Rome, which was released on 28 August.

=== 2021: To Find Happiness ===
On 5 November 2021, Pyke announced the release of his seventh studio album, To Find Happiness, released on 18 March 2022.

=== 2026: Kingdom Within ===
In March 2026, Pyke announced his eighth studio album Kingdom Within, alongside the release of its title track as the lead single.

== Children's books ==
In June 2019, Pyke published his first children's picture book Lights Out, Leonard. The book has gone on to be released in six foreign territories and translated into five languages. Since then Pyke has released another six picture books: A Banana is a Banana, The Incredible Runaway Snot, Chatterpuss, Chatterpuss, In Deep Water, Family Tree, and The Bewilderbeast. Notably, Family Tree was the ALIA National Simultaneous Story time book for 2022, seeing over 2.6 million people reading the book at the same time, and featuring Pyke and Ghosh appearing on a livestream from the National Library of Australia in the record breaking event.

== Ambassador and partnerships ==
=== Indigenous Literacy Foundation (ILF) and Busking for Change ===
Pyke is an Indigenous Literacy Foundation (ILF) ambassador and has contributed thousands of dollars towards the fund. In September 2009, Pyke held the event 'Busking for Change' as part of Indigenous Literacy day, with all proceeds going towards the ILF. Pyke performed a solo set to a small audience, along with guest speakers from the ILF discussing the need for change in literacy levels in Indigenous communities. Pyke stated: "Indigenous issues are something I've been interested in for many years, and the concept of words and language and communicating ideas in that way is especially relevant to my own career". Following the success of the 2009 event, events were held annually and in 2012, Pyke confirmed he had raised over $50,000 in total for the ILF.

=== Josh Pyke Partnership ===
In conjunction with APRA in early 2013, Busking for Change presented the Josh Pyke Partnership. The partnership offered an unsigned musician the opportunity to receive mentorship and funding to help grow their career. Applicants submit a business plan explaining how they would like to grow their musical career. The prize included an initial meeting with Pyke, Gregg Donovan (Wonderlick Entertainment) and Stephen Wade (Select Music), a follow-up meeting and $7500 in funding. At the end of 2014, Pyke announced the return of the Josh Pyke Partnership, which ran annually. 2023 was the final year of the program.

Year	Winner	Ref.
2014	Govs (aka Josiah Birrell)	
2015	Gordi	
2016	Alex Lahey	
2017	Angie McMahon	
2018	Sumner (aka Jack McLaine & Chloe Wilson)	
2019	Eilish Gilligan	
2020	Bec Sykes	
2021	Allegra Neve	
2023	Howevever (Isaac Lee)	

== Discography ==
- Memories & Dust (2007)
- Chimney's Afire (2008)
- Only Sparrows (2011)
- The Beginning and the End of Everything (2013)
- But for All These Shrinking Hearts (2015)
- Rome (2020)
- To Find Happiness (2022)
- Kingdom Within (2026)

== Awards ==
=== AIR Awards ===
The Australian Independent Record Awards (commonly known informally as AIR Awards) is an annual awards night to recognise, promote and celebrate the success of Australia's Independent Music sector.

Year	Nominee / work	Award	Result	Ref.
2024	It's Gonna Be a Great, Great Day!	Best Independent Children's Album or EP	Won	

=== APRA Awards ===
The APRA Awards are held in Australia and New Zealand by the Australasian Performing Right Association to recognise songwriting skills, sales and airplay performance by its members annually. Pyke has won one award from three nominations.

Year	Nominee / work	Award	Result
2007	"Middle of the Hill"	Most Performed Blues and Roots Work	Nominated
2008	"When We Get There" (with Michael Yezerski) (from The Black Balloon)	Best Original Song Composed for Screen	Won
2012	"Throw It Away" (360 featuring Josh Pyke)	Urban Work of the Year	Nominated
2022	Troppo	Best Television Theme	Nominated

=== ARIA Music Awards ===
The ARIA Music Awards is an annual awards ceremony that recognises excellence, innovation, and achievement across all genres of Australian music. Pyke has won five awards from eighteen nominations.

Year	Nominee / work	Award	Result
2006	Feeding the Wolves	Best Pop Release	Nominated
2007	Memories & Dust	Best Male Artist	Nominated
2007	Memories & Dust	Best Adult Contemporary Album	Won
2007	Memories & Dust	Breakthrough Artist – Album	Nominated
2007	Wayne Connolly & Josh Pyke for Memories & Dust	Producer of the Year	Won
2007	Wayne Connolly & Josh Pyke for Memories & Dust	Engineer of the Year	Won
2009	Chimney's Afire	Best Male Artist	Nominated
2009	Chimney's Afire	Best Adult Contemporary Album	Won
2010	The Lighthouse	Best Music DVD	Nominated
2011	"No One Wants a Lover"	Best Male Artist	Nominated
2011	Wayne Connolly & Josh Pyke for "No One Wants a Lover"	Producer of the Year	Nominated
2011	Wayne Connolly & Josh Pyke for "No One Wants a Lover"	Engineer of the Year	Nominated
2012	Only Sparrows	Best Adult Contemporary Album	Nominated
2012	Wayne Connolly & Josh Pyke for Only Sparrows	Engineer of the Year	Nominated
2013	The Beginning and the End of Everything	Best Adult Contemporary Album	Nominated
2014	John Castle & Josh Pyke for The Beginning and the End of Everything	Producer of the Year	Nominated
2016	Live at the Sydney Opera House (with Sydney Symphony Orchestra)	Best Original Soundtrack/Cast/Show Album	Won
2020	Rome	Best Adult Contemporary Album	Nominated
2024	It's Gonna Be a Great, Great Day!	Best Children's Album	Nominated

=== Country Music Awards of Australia ===
The Country Music Awards of Australia (CMAA) (also known as the Golden Guitar Awards) is an annual awards night held in January during the Tamworth Country Music Festival, celebrating recording excellence in the Australian country music industry. They have been held annually since 1973.

Year	Nominee / work	Award	Result
2017	"F U Cancer" (with Catherine Britt)	Vocal Collaboration of the Year	Won

=== J Awards ===
The J Awards are an annual series of Australian music awards that were established by the Australian Broadcasting Corporation's youth-focused radio station Triple J. They commenced in 2005.

Year	Nominee / work	Award	Result
2007	Memories & Dust	Australian Album of the Year	Nominated
2008	"Make You Happy"	Australian Video of the Year	Nominated

=== Major Minor Music Awards ===
Year	Nominee / work	Award	Result	Ref.
2023	"Little River Runs" (with Tiptoe Giants)	APRA Song of the Year	Won	

=== National Live Music Awards ===
The National Live Music Awards (NLMAs) commenced in 2016 to recognise contributions to the live music industry in Australia.

Year	Nominee / work	Award	Result	Ref.
2023	Josh Pyke	Musicians Making a Difference	Nominated	
