= The Vines discography =

- Studio albums: 7
- Extended plays: 4
- Soundtrack albums: 2
- Compilation albums: 1
- Singles: 12

This is a discography of the Australian alternative rock band The Vines.

== Albums ==
=== Studio albums ===
Title	Album details	Peak chart positions										Certifications (sales thresholds)
Title	Album details	AUS	AUT	FRA	GER	IRE	NZ	SCO	SWI	UK	US	Certifications (sales thresholds)
Highly Evolved	Released: 14 July 2002; Format: CD, vinyl; Label: Capitol	5	28	56	33	13	48	3	—	3	11	ARIA: Platinum; BPI: Gold; MC: Gold; RIAA: Gold
Winning Days	Released: 21 March 2004; Label: Capitol; Format: CD, vinyl	7	40	51	47	—	—	27	77	29	23	
Vision Valley	Released: 1 April 2006; Label: Capitol; Format: CD, vinyl	14	—	152	—	—	—	73	94	71	136	
Melodia	Released: 12 July 2008; Label: Ivy League; Format: CD, digital download	12	—	—	—	—	—	—	—	—	—	
Future Primitive	Released: 3 June 2011; Label: Sony Music Australia; Format: CD, digital download	24	—	—	—	—	—	—	—	—	—	
Wicked Nature	Released: 2 September 2014; Label: Wicked Nature Music; Format: 2CD, 2LP, digital download	29	—	—	—	—	—	—	—	—	—	
In Miracle Land	Released: 29 June 2018; Label: Wicked Nature Music; Format: CD, digital download	74	—	—	—	—	—	—	—	—	—	
"—" denotes releases that did not chart.

=== Compilations ===
- The Best of The Vines (March 11, 2008)

=== Demos and EPs ===
- Demo (2001, handed out at gigs during a tour with You Am I in 2001)
- Mixes (2001, unmastered album)
- This Is Not The Vines Album (2002, 6-track EP)
- College EP (2002, US 5-track promo CD)

== Singles ==
List of singles, with selected chart positions, showing year released and album name
Title	Year	Peak positions									Album
Title	Year	AUS	CAN	CAN Rock	SCO	UK	US Bub.	US Alt	US Main	US Rock	Album
"Hot Leather" / "Sun Child" (Note: "Hot Leather" / "Sun Child" was a limited edition (1,000 copies) Australian-only 7" vinyl release.)	2001	—	×	×	—	—	—	—	—	—	Non-album single
"Factory"	2001	—	×	×	—	198	—	—	—	—	Highly Evolved
"Highly Evolved"	2002	97	×	×	39	32	—	—	—	—	Highly Evolved
"Get Free"	2002	44	×	×	22	24	22	7	27	22	Highly Evolved
"Outtathaway!"	2002	38	×	×	20	20	—	19	—	—	Highly Evolved
"Homesick"	2003	50	×	×	—	—	—	—	—	—	Highly Evolved
"Ride"	2004	44	12	21	25	25	—	13	—	—	Winning Days
"Winning Days"	2004	65	—	—	47	42	—	—	—	—	Winning Days
"Don't Listen to the Radio"	2006	46	—	—	40	66	—	—	—	—	Vision Valley
"Anysound"	2006	89	—	—	46	63	—	—	—	—	Vision Valley
"He's a Rocker" (Note: "He's a Rocker" was only released in Australia as a single.)	2008	71	—	—	—	—	—	—	—	—	Melodia
"Get Out"	2008	—	—	—	—	—	—	—	—	—	Melodia
"Metal Zone" (Note: "Metal Zone" was only released in Australia as a single.)	2014	—	—	—	—	—	—	—	—	—	Wicked Nature
"In Miracle Land"	2018	—	—	—	—	—	—	—	—	—	In Miracle Land
"—" denotes releases that did not chart. "×" denotes periods where charts did not exist or were not archived.

=== Promotional singles ===
Title	Year	Album
"Fuck the World" (Note: "Fuck the World" was released as a 7" vinyl promotional single.)	2003	Winning Days
"Gross Out" (Note: "Gross Out" was released as a radio and video-only promotional single.)	2006	Vision Valley
"Dope Train" (Note: "Dope Train" was released as an Australia exclusive video-only promotional single.)	2007	Vision Valley
"MerryGoRound" (Note: "MerryGoRound" was released as an Australia exclusive radio-only promotional single.)	2008	Melodia
"Gimme Love" (Note: "Gimme Love" was released as an Australia exclusive 7" vinyl promotional single.)	2011	Future Primitive
"Future Primitive" (Note: "Future Primitive" was released as a 7" vinyl promotional single.)	2011	Future Primitive

== Soundtracks ==
- I Am Sam (2002, covered "I'm Only Sleeping" by The Beatles)
- Bruce Almighty (2003, song "Outtathaway!")
- Agent Cody Banks (2003, song "Get Free")
- Kicking & Screaming (2005, song "Ride")
- Flat Out 2 (2006, song "Don't Listen to the Radio")
- No Man's Woman (2007, covered "4ever" by The Veronicas)
- Guitar Hero 6 (2011, song "Get Free")
- The Inbetweeners Movie (2011, song "Gimme Love")
- Borderlands: The Pre-Sequel (2014, songs "Black Dragon" and "Goodbye" )
- Far Cry 5 (2018, song "Get Free")

== Covers ==
Apart from songs by various bands on compilations and at their early shows, The Vines have also covered two songs by hip hop duo Outkast.

- An acoustic cover of "Ms. Jackson" was released as a B-side on their 2002 single, "Outtathaway!". The rap verses are not sung, leaving it with just the chorus and bridge.
- "So Fresh, So Clean" was performed at the Big Day Out, an Australian music festival, in early 2007.
