= The Best of The Vines =

Greatest hits album by The Vines
- Released: 11 March 2008 (U.S.)
- Recorded: Jul 2001–Feb 2002 The Sound Factory (Hollywood, California), 2003 Bearsville Studios (New York), 2005 BJB studios (Sydney)
- Genre: Alternative rock, garage rock, post-grunge, neo-psychedelia
- Length: 54:37
- Label: Capitol
- Producer: Rob Schnapf, Wayne Connolly, The Vines

The Vines chronology
Vision Valley (2006)	The Best of The Vines (2008)	Melodia (2008)

Professional ratings
Review scores
Source	Rating
Allmusic	4/5 stars
Q	4/5 stars

The Best of The Vines is a compilation album by The Vines and contains a selection of singles and album tracks from their first three albums released under Capitol Records. The band did not have a say in the release having been dropped by Capitol Records in 2007, however they picked the songs.

== Track listing ==
No.	Title	From	Length
1.	"Get Free"	Highly Evolved	2:06
2.	"Ride"	Winning Days	2:36
3.	"Highly Evolved"	Highly Evolved	1:35
4.	"Winning Days"	Winning Days	3:33
5.	"Outtathaway"	Highly Evolved	3:02
6.	"Autumn Shade"	Highly Evolved	2:18
7.	"Autumn Shade II"	Winning Days	3:14
8.	"Factory"	Highly Evolved	3:12
9.	"Animal Machine"	Winning Days	3:28
10.	"Don't Listen to the Radio"	Vision Valley	2:12
11.	"Vision Valley"	Vision Valley	2:42
12.	"Homesick"	Highly Evolved	4:53
13.	"Fuck the World"	Winning Days	3:41
14.	"Spaceship"	Vision Valley	6:07
15.	"Anysound"	Vision Valley	1:55
16.	"Sun Child"	Winning Days	4:33

== Personnel ==
- Craig Nicholls – vocals, guitars, keys, moog
- Ryan Griffiths – guitars, keys, percussion, backing vocals
- Hamish Rosser – drums, percussion, backing vocals
- Dave Oliffe – drums on "Highly Evolved", "Autumn Shade", "Outtathaway", "Homesick" (outro only)
- Joey Waronker – drums on "Get Free"
- Pete Thomas – drums on "Factory", "Homesick" (excerpt)
- Patrick Matthews – bass
- Andy Kent – bass
- Amanda Brown – violin
- Rowan Smith – violin
- Sophie Glasson – cello
- Roger Joseph Manning Jr. - Keyboards

== Other Credits ==
- Rob Schnapf – Additional Guitars ("Homesick" and "Factory"), Producer, Mixing
- Doug Boehm – Engineering, Mixing
- Ted Jensen – Mastering
- Ethan Johns – Additional Percussion ("Get Free", "Autumn Shade", "Factory")
- Andrew Slater – Executive Producer
- Andy Wallace – Mixing ("Get Free")
- Doug Boehm – Engineer
- Steven Rhodes – Additional Percussion ("Get Free", "Autumn Shade", "Factory"), Additional Engineering
- Wayne Connolly – producer, recorder, mixing
- Dan Clinch – additional engineering
- Anthony The – additional engineering
- Veit Mahler – additional engineering

== Release history ==
Country	Release date
United States	11 March 2008
Australia	5 April 2008
United Kingdom	5 May 2008
