= Homesick (The Vines song) =

- Cover art of CD 1 featuring frontman Craig Nicholls

Single by the Vines

from the album Highly Evolved
- Released: 12 May 2003
- Recorded: 2001
- Genre: Alternative rock
- Length: 4:53
- Label: EMI/Capitol
- Songwriter(s): Craig Nicholls
- Producer(s): Rob Schnapf

The Vines singles chronology
"Outtathaway" (2002)	"Homesick" (2003)	"Fuck the World" (2003)

"Homesick" is the fourth and final single from the Vines' debut album Highly Evolved. The single, which was only released in Australia, peaked in the ARIA Singles Chart top 50. Four different versions of the single were released, with each single featuring a portrait of a band member and different B-sides.

== Track listing ==
CD 1 (Craig Nicholls)
No.	Title	Writer(s)	Producer(s)	Length
1.	"Homesick"	Craig Nicholls	Rob Schnapf
2.	"Outtathaway!" (live at KROQ)	Nicholls
3.	"Highly Evolved" (video)

CD 2 (Patrick Matthews)
No.	Title	Writer(s)	Producer(s)	Length
1.	"Homesick"	Craig Nicholls	Rob Schnapf
2.	"Highly Evolved" (live at KROQ)	Craig Nicholls
3.	"Get Free" (video)

CD 3 (Ryan Griffiths)
No.	Title	Writer(s)	Producer(s)	Length
1.	"Homesick"	Craig Nicholls	Rob Schnapf
2.	"Get Free" (live at KROQ)	Nicholls
3.	"Outtathaway!" (video)

CD 4 (Hamish Rosser)
No.	Title	Writer(s)	Producer(s)	Length
1.	"Homesick"	Craig Nicholls	Rob Schnapf
2.	"Mary Jane" (live at KROQ)	Nicholls
3.	"Homesick" (video)

All tracks are written by Craig Nicholls

12" vinyl single
No.	Title	Producer(s)	Length
1.	"Homesick"	Rob Schnapf
2.	"Outtathaway!" (live at KROQ)
3.	"Highly Evolved" (live at KROQ)
4.	"Get Free" (live at KROQ)
5.	"Mary Jane" (live at KROQ)

== Charts ==
Chart performance for "Homesick"
Chart (2003)	Peak position
Australia (ARIA)	50
