= Melodia (album) =

Studio album by The Vines
- Released: 12 July 2008 (Australia)
- Recorded: November 2007 – March 2008
- Studio: Sunset Sound, Hollywood, California, United States; Kingsize Sound, Los Angeles
- Genre: Alternative rock; garage rock; post-grunge; neo-psychedelia
- Length: 32:42
- Label: Ivy League
- Producer: Rob Schnapf

The Vines chronology
The Best of The Vines (2008)	Melodia (2008)	Future Primitive (2011)

Singles from Melodia
- 1. "He's a Rocker" Released: 3 June 2008; 2. "MerryGoRound" Released: 21 July 2008 (Australian radio promo-only); 3. "Get Out" Released: 29 September 2008

Melodia is the fourth studio album by Australian alternative rock band The Vines. The album was produced by Rob Schnapf, and subsequently released by Ivy League Records in Australia on 12 July 2008, and through retailer Insound, in the United States on 22 July 2008. The album peaked at number 12 on the Australian ARIA Charts.

== Background ==
Recording of the album was completed during the week of 3–10 March 2008, with a release occurring in July 2008. Originally thought to be called Braindead, the title of the album was confirmed via their MySpace website on 22 May 2008 to be Melodia and an official track listing was also announced. The band demoed 25 songs, only 14 of which made the final cut. This is The Vines' first album for record label Ivy League Records, after parting ways with EMI and Capitol Records in 2007. The band began recording in Los Angeles in November 2007 with producer Rob Schnapf, who has also worked on their albums Highly Evolved and Winning Days. The song "True as the Night" is the sequel to the song "Vision Valley", which appeared on the album of the same name.

The first single "He's a Rocker" was debuted officially at the 2008 MTV Awards in Australia, on 26 April, with airplay beginning on radio soon after. "He's a Rocker" was released through iTunes on 3 June, with two bonus tracks. "Blue Jam" being a rough early version of "Jamola" with "Hey Now" being an exclusive non-album song.

A limited number of signed copies of the album were made available for online pre-order on 23 June in Australia, whilst Melodia was sold on CD exclusively in the United States by Insound, from 22 July. Orders online through Insound received a free MP3 of the song "Make Believe".

Melodia had its UK physical release on 6 October 2008. The second single from the album is "Get Out".

"Get Out" is part of the soundtrack played during the video game Midnight Club: Los Angeles.

It was announced in February 2021 that Melodia would be reissued for Record Store Day on 21 June 2021.

In comparison to their previous albums, it has received mixed reviews from critics, a situation that has recurred with every album released since Winning Days.

== Reception ==
Professional ratings
Aggregate scores
Source	Rating
Metacritic	44/100
Review scores
Source	Rating
AllMusic	2.5/5 stars
Drowned in Sound	2/10
Mojo	2/5 stars
musicOMH	3/5 stars
NME	4/10
PopMatters	4/10
Spin	6/10
Q	3/5 stars
Uncut	2/5 stars
Under the Radar	6/10

Initial critical response to Melodia was average. At Metacritic, which assigns a normalised rating out of 100 to reviews from mainstream critics, the album has received an average score of 44, based on 10 reviews.

== Track listing ==
All tracks are written by Craig Nicholls.

No.	Title	Length
1.	"Get Out"	2:10
2.	"Manger"	2:02
3.	"A.S. III"	1:53
4.	"He's a Rocker"	1:57
5.	"Orange Amber"	2:01
6.	"Jamola"	0:59
7.	"True as the Night"	6:07
8.	"Braindead"	2:26
9.	"Kara Jayne"	2:07
10.	"MerryGoRound"	2:12
11.	"Hey"	1:33
12.	"A Girl I Knew"	2:19
13.	"Scream"	2:00
14.	"She Is Gone"	2:52

== B-sides and bonus tracks ==
Song	Length	Source
"Blue Jam"	1:05	He's a Rocker EP
"Hey Now"	1:20	He's a Rocker EP
"Make Believe"	1:25	Insound pre-order / iTunes bonus track

== Personnel ==
- Craig Nicholls – vocals, guitars, album cover with Love Police
- Ryan Griffiths – guitars, backing vocals
- Hamish Rosser – drums, percussion
- Brad Heald – bass, backing vocals
- Rob Schnapf – production, mixing, 12-string guitar on "Orange Amber" and acoustic guitar on "A.S. III"
- Doug Boehm – recording, mixing
- Graham Hope – assistant recording
- Dave Bowling – assistant recording
- Jason Gossman – assistant mixing
- Clint Welander – assistant mixing
- John Oreshnick – drum tuning / drum set
- Jason Borger – string arrangement ("True as the Night")
- Daphne Chen – violin
- Amy Wickman – violin
- Stirling Trent – violin
- Matt Fish – cello
- Love Police – album sleeve / artwork

== Charts ==
Chart (2008)	Peak position
Australian Albums (ARIA)	12

== Release history ==
Country	Release date	Record label
Australia	12 July 2008	
United Kingdom	14 July 2008	HMV
United Kingdom	6 October 2008	HMV
New Zealand	15 July 2008	
United States	22 July 2008	Insound
