= He's a Rocker =

Single by The Vines

from the album Melodia
- Released: 3 June 2008 (iTunes)
- Recorded: Between November 2007 and March 2008
- Genre: Garage rock, alternative rock
- Length: 1:56
- Label: Ivy League Records
- Songwriter: Craig Nicholls
- Producer: Rob Schnapf

The Vines singles chronology
"Anysound" (2006)	"He's a Rocker" (2008)	"Get Out" (2008)

"He's a Rocker" is a song by Australian rock band The Vines and is the first single from their 2008 album Melodia. It was premiered at the 2008 MTV Australia Awards on 26 April and eventually made its way onto video sharing websites with the studio version appearing on the Vines official Myspace page a few days later. The single includes two B-sides; "Hey Now" which is an exclusive track, and "Blue Jam", a demo version of "Jamola", a Melodia track.

The video made its premiere on Channel V's program 'What U Want' on 6 June 2008, and is being streamed online.

The song entered the chart at number 91 before peaking at number 71. The single is notable because none of its tracks exceed two minutes in length.

== Track listing ==
CD single
No.	Title	Writer(s)	Producer(s)	Length
1.	"He's a Rocker"	Craig Nicholls	Rob Schnapf	1:57
2.	"Hey Now"			1:16
3.	"Blue Jam"	Nicholls		1:06

== Charts ==
Chart performance for "He's a Rocker"
Chart (2022)	Peak position
Australia (ARIA)	71
