= Ryan Griffiths (guitarist) =

Australian musician

- Born: 14 February 1978 (age 47); Sydney, New South Wales, Australia
- Genres: Alternative rock, garage rock revival, post-grunge, indie rock, neo-psychedelia
- Occupation: Musician
- Instrument(s): Guitars, keyboards, backing vocals
- Years active: 2002–present

Ryan Griffiths (born 14 February 1978) is an Australian musician. From March 2002 to December 2011 he was a member of the garage rock band The Vines. Craig Nicholls, who founded the group, realised while touring for the promotion of their debut album, Highly Evolved (July 2002), that they needed an additional guitarist. So Nicholls asked his longtime friend and schoolmate Griffiths to join. As a member of The Vines he appeared on four of their studio albums, Winning Days (March 2004), Vision Valley (April 2006), Melodia (July 2008) and Future Primitive (June 2011). During his tenure Griffiths provided guitars (acoustic, rhythm or lead), keyboards, percussion and backing vocals before leaving, along with their drummer, Hamish Rosser, in December 2011.

== Biography ==
Ryan Griffiths was born on 14 February 1978 and grew up in Sydney. Griffiths and Craig Nicholls (founder of garage rock band, The Vines in 1994) attended the same school. Nicholls later remembered attending his first concert with Griffiths, "I went with Ryan [to see The Screaming Jets] and I remember we were pretty young and I couldn't really see much because I was small and we were near the back".

By March 2002 Nicholls had asked Griffiths to join The Vines, to tour and promote their debut album, Highly Evolved, which had been recorded by February. Alongside Griffiths and Nicholls, The Vines line-up was Patrick Matthews on bass guitar and Hamish Rosser on drums. Initially Griffiths played acoustic guitar, eventually he provided rhythm guitar, lead guitar, keyboards, percussion and backing vocals. As a member of The Vines he appeared on their studio albums, Winning Days (March 2004), Vision Valley (April 2006), Melodia (July 2008) and Future Primitive (June 2011). When playing on stage, Griffiths prefers his instruments mixed at lower levels.

In 2005, as The Vines prepared for their third album, Vision Valley, Rosser indicated that he had written tracks with Griffiths but "it's likely only Craig Nicholls's work will show up on the new album". Griffiths co-wrote "Gimme Love" with Nicholls and Rosser, which appeared on their fifth studio album, Future Primitive and was issued as its lead single in mid-2011. The track was also used for the feature film, The Inbetweeners Movie (2011). In May 2011, Griffiths reflected on working in The Vines, "we were always a pretty tight unit, you know? We’re all good mates and we play music together really well. There was never any sort of point where we found it difficult to continue making music. It was just something that we all did so naturally together". In December that year The Vines appeared at the Homebake music festival without Griffiths or Rosser. In March 2012 Rosser joined heavy rockers, Wolfmother, while Griffiths contemplated a solo career.

=== Solo work ===
According to The Vines official fan club, from 2007, Ryan Griffiths wrote songs intending to release a solo album. Tracks that were written had influences from The Dandy Warhols, Brian Jonestown Massacre and Black Rebel Motorcycle Club. As of yet, no solo material has surfaced.
