= Outtathaway! =

Single by the Vines

from the album Highly Evolved
- Released: 18 November 2002
- Recorded: July 2001–February 2002
- Studio: The Sound Factory, Hollywood, California
- Length: 3:02
- Label: Engine Room, EMI/Capitol
- Songwriter: Craig Nicholls
- Producer: Rob Schnapf

The Vines singles chronology
"Get Free" (2002)	"Outtathaway!" (2002)	"Homesick" (2003)

"Outtathaway!" is the third single by Australian alternative rock band the Vines from their debut album Highly Evolved. It was released in Australia as a radio edit single via Engine Room Music/EMI on 18 November 2002, which peaked at No. 38 on the ARIA Singles Chart. It is the Vines' highest-charting single and was written by the group's lead singer and guitarist, Craig Nicholls. The song was used in the feature film, Bruce Almighty (May 2003), but was not included on the official movie soundtrack album.

== Music video ==
The music video, directed by David LaChapelle, sees the band in a club, playing in front of a debauched crowd (notably, the video starts with one fan slapping his own face with a sneaker). During the song, Nicholls drifts around the microphone slashing at his guitar while gig-goers drink and dive off balconies and crowd surf. The video grows more frantic and feverish as the song progresses, with the camera occasionally cutting to images of Nicholls and friends stumbling around the halls, destroying dressing rooms and break dancing in the toilets. During the video, a girl rushes up on stage to hug Nicholls, who he apparently throws over his shoulder. At the very end, bassist and drummer are swarmed by the crowd, while Nicholls discards his guitar and gives the drum kit a hug.

== Track listing ==
Australian CD single (version 1)
No.	Title	Writer(s)	Producer(s)	Length
1.	"Outtathaway!"	Craig Nicholls	Rob Schnapf	3:03
2.	"Ms. Jackson" (Outkast cover)	André Benjamin; Antwan Patton; David Sheats; Richard Wagner; Stan Watts; Shuggie Otis		3:30
3.	"Country Yard" (live at Glastonbury)	Nicholls
4.	"Outtathaway!" (video)

Australian CD single (version 2)
No.	Title	Writer(s)	Producer(s)	Length
1.	"Outtathaway!"	Craig Nicholls	Rob Schnapf	3:02
2.	"Don't Go"			2:52
3.	"Get Free" (Live at Reading Festival)	Nicholls		2:41
4.	"Highly Evolved" (recorded live at Triple J)	Nicholls

== Charts ==
Chart (2002)	Peak position
Australia (ARIA)	38
Scotland Singles (OCC)	20
UK Singles (OCC)	20
US Alternative Airplay (Billboard)	19
