= Toby Martin =

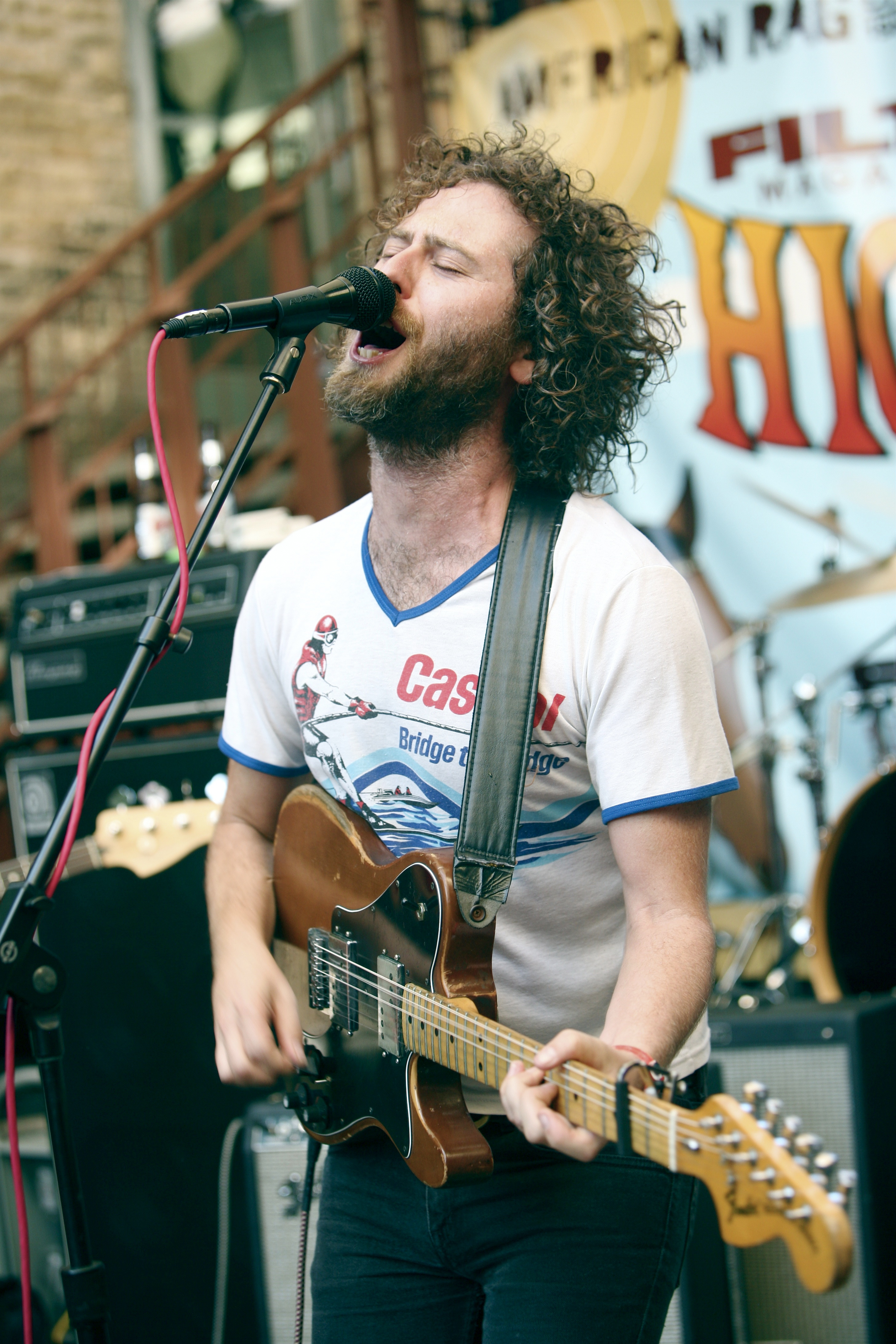
- Martin in 2007

Background information
- Born: William Toby Martin; 5 August 1975 (age 51); Melbourne, Victoria, Australia
- Genres: Alternative rock, indie rock
- Occupations: Singer-songwriter, musician, academic, lecturer
- Instruments: Guitar, vocals
- Years active: 1996–present

William Toby Martin (born 5 August 1975), is an Australian singer-songwriter, musician, academic, and lecturer at University of Huddersfield UK. Martin is the grandson of Hungarian-born Australian poet David Martin and has a PhD in the history of Australian music from the University of Sydney. After fronting Sydney-based band Youth Group from 1996 to 2009, Martin developed his solo career, releasing his first album, Love's Shadow in 2012.

Martin's PhD thesis, published in 2012, is titled "Yodelling boundary riders : country music in Australia, 1936–2010".

In 2017, Martin released his second solo album, entitled Songs from Northam Avenue. The album was written in Bankstown, and features musical accompaniment by several locals to the area.

== Early life and career ==
Martin was born in Melbourne and grew up in the suburb of Hawthorn. He attended Preshil School. At 15, he moved to Canberra attending school at Narrabundah College with Cameron Emerson-Elliott, (a future co-member of the band Youth Group), where they wrote songs together as The Morris Brothers. Martin moved to Sydney some years later. (Not to be confused with a different Toby Martin, from Adelaide, who was in the band Poxsii Barccs, with Andy Strachan, Gary Hopper and Paul Inglis, which played around Melbourne.) In 1996 he formed Youth Group and the band later achieved success with their cover version of "Forever Young" by Alphaville which made no 1 on Australian record charts.

== Academic career ==
Martin was formerly a lecturer at the University of Huddersfield in the UK, where he taught songwriting, performance, musicology and world music to music students. Martin currently is a lecturer in Contemporary Music at the Sydney Conservatorium of Music (University of Sydney). As a songwriter and performer, his research includes practice-based approaches, including the paper Making Music in Bankstown: Responding to Place Through Song, in an IASPM Journal special issue focused on practice-based popular music research. Martin's thesis on the history of Australian country music, Yodelling Boundary Riders, was published in 2015. His extensive research and knowledge of Australian country music lead him to feature as a part of the 2020 Joy McKean documentary, Slim & I.

== Touring ==
With Youth Group, Martin has toured extensively in Australia, as well as the US, Canada and UK. In 2012, he toured solo down Australia's East Coast supporting Seeker Lover Keeper. Following the release of Songs from Northam Avenue, he has performed solo in the UK and Australia since 2017.

== Awards ==
Martin's band Youth Group were nominated for four Australian Recording Industry Association (ARIA) Music Awards in 2006.

== Discography ==
Solo

- Love's Shadow (2012)
- Songs from Northam Avenue (2017)
- I Felt the Valley Lifting (2021)

with Youth Group

- Urban & Eastern (2001)
- Skeleton Jar (2004)
- Casino Twilight Dogs (2006)
- The Night Is Ours (2009)
- Australian Halloween (2019)
