= Ryan Griffiths =

Ryan Griffiths may refer to:

- Ryan Griffiths (guitarist) (born 1978), Australian guitarist
- Ryan Griffiths (soccer) (born 1981), Australian footballer
