= Lay Down the Law =

Lay Down the Law may refer to:

- Lay Down the Law (Keel album)
- Lay Down the Law (Switches album)
- "Lay Down the Law", a song by Gotthard from the album G.
