= The Night Is Ours =

The Night Is Ours may refer to:

- The Night Is Ours (album), a 2008 album by Youth Group
- The Night Is Ours (1930 film), a German drama film
- The Night Is Ours (1952 film), a Mexican drama film
- The Night Is Ours (1953 film), a French drama film
