= Dog Society =

American rock band

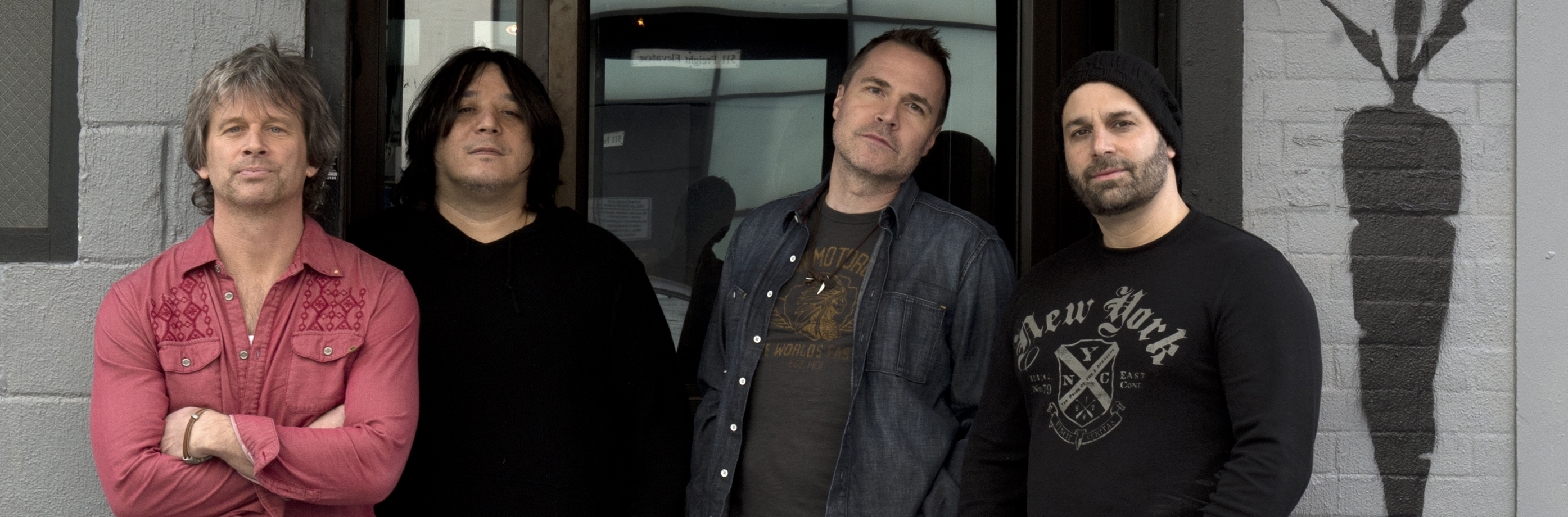

Background information
- Origin: New York, New York
- Genres: Hard rock, alternative rock, pop rock
- Years active: 1991 – present
- Labels: Independent, East West/Atlantic
- Members: Bruce Erik Brauer; Rich Guerzon; Joe Ranieri; Brian Schnaak
- Website: dogsociety.tv

Dog Society is an American rock band based in New York City. Their debut album, Test Your Own Eyes, was released by EastWest / Atlantic Records in 1993. After nearly twenty years without a studio album, the band independently released Emerge in 2012. Emerge was followed by another independent 12 song project entitled "In The Shade" which was released in the fall of 2014.

== History ==
=== Test Your Own Eyes ===
The band was formed in 1991 by Bruce Erik Brauer (guitar, vocals), Rich Guerzon (bass, vocals), Joe Ranieri (drums/percussion) and lead vocalist Brian Schnaak (then performing under the stage name Ryan Bay, a Pig Latin rendering of “Brian”). Their debut, Test Your Own Eyes, was released in 1993. The album was produced by Rob Schnapf and Tom Rothrock after months of rehearsing in a 12-foot by 12-foot tool shed. At the time the record label claimed that they might be the first “tool shed band.” The Washington Post praised the album for its “catchy melodies, Beatlesque harmonies, alternately droning and jangly guitars, and a nod and a wink to The Who and other fab Brits.”

After the release of Test Your Own Eyes the band toured extensively, opening for such acts as Sheryl Crow, Stone Temple Pilots, and The Mighty Mighty Bosstones.

=== Hiatus ===
Although they did not record another album for nineteen years, the band continued to play shows throughout the New York City Area. Speaking of the hiatus, Guerzon said, “The break was just life taking us on different journeys. I knew we would cross paths again someday. Why shouldn't we? We shared an experience of making music together that we will always cherish.”

=== Emerge ===
On September 25, 2012, the band independently released Emerge. Once again the album was co-produced by Schnapf and Rothrock. Skope Magazine wrote of the album, “Dog Society breaks the mold with their powerhouse sound and delivers invigorating music that has a deep-seated hard rock feel to it. The band is red hot and the production value is rock solid for an Independent Artist.”

=== 2013 ===
The band opened up for "Daughtry" and "The Fray" at The Beacon Theater in New York City.

The franchise Entertainment Tonight featured Dog Society in Brook Anderson's Music Minute.

To commemorate the 20th anniversary of the release of the first album, "Test Your Own Eyes", Dog Society recorded a LIVE 5 song EP entitled the "SIR Session" recorded at SIR Studios in New York City. Surrounded by friends and family, the band got together and casually recorded the acoustic performance into the mobile Pro Tools set up and released a DVD of the raw performance.

Joe Ranieri was featured as Dog Society's drummer in Modern Drummer - November 2013.

== Discography ==
=== Albums ===
- In The Shade (2014), Dog Society
- The SIR Session DVD (2013), Dog Society
- Emerge (2012), Dog Society
- Test Your Own Eyes (1993), EastWest / Atlantic Records

=== Singles ===
- ”Our Own Parade” (2014)
- "Shine On Through" Christmas Single (2013), Dog Society
- ”The Fuse Before” (2012)
