= Switches (band) =

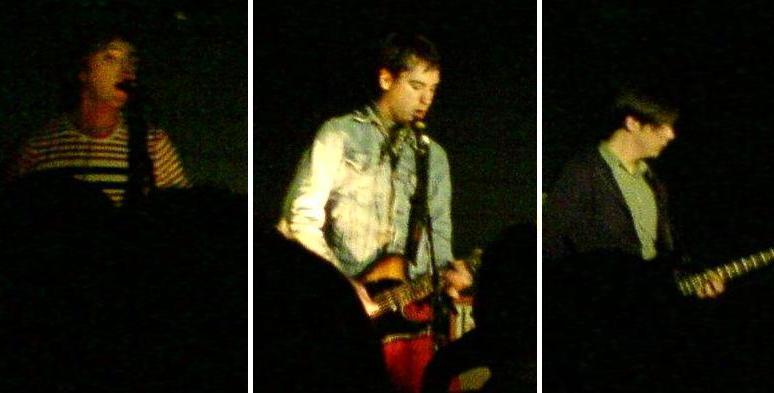
- Switches performing in April 2007. Left to right: Ollie Thomas, Matt Bishop and Max Tite.

Background information
- Origin: Southend and Guildford, England
- Genres: Indie rock, Indie-pop, Post-Punk Revival
- Years active: 2005–2008
- Labels: Degenerate Music; Atlantic Records; Interscope (US)
- Past members: Matt Bishop; Ollie Thomas; Thom Kirkpatrick; Steve Godfrey; James Gardiner; Max Tite

Switches were an English indie rock band, consisting of members Matt Bishop (lead vocals and guitar), Ollie Thomas (guitar and backing vocals), Maxwell Tite (bass guitar) and James Gardiner pka Jimmy G (drums) .

== Career ==
The band initially met whilst at university in Guildford, Surrey. When Matt was young, he wrote songs and made music in his Essex home. After meeting and befriending the other band members, they did some gigs and got publishing interest before finding a manager. Meanwhile, the boys where experimenting with different band names in order to "conjure something non-cliché, something simple and bold". They cite many artists as their main influences, all of whom can be seen here.

They released their debut EP on Degenerate Records, entitled Message from Yuz on 10 July 2006. It was produced by Paul Schroeder. Their debut single (limited to 500 copies), "Lay Down the Law" appeared in September 2006. The band began recording their debut album in August 2006 at Sunset Sound Studios in Los Angeles, where Prince recorded some of his classic 1980s material. The album was recorded by record producer Rob Schnapf and engineer Doug Boehm.

Switches toured with The Rakes, The Automatic, Graham Coxon and played the Reading and Leeds Festivals. The band released their second single 'Drama Queen', their first official release with Atlantic Records, on 29 January 2007.

The band's debut album, Heart Tuned To D.E.A.D., was released on 23 April 2007, preceded by their second official single, a re-recording of "Lay Down The Law". The album reached No. 64 on the UK Albums Chart.

The band made their Glastonbury debut in the summer of 2007, opening Saturday's Other Stage. At the start of 2008, Thom Kirkpatrick (bass) and Steve Godfrey (drums) replaced original members Max Tite and James Gardiner. Switches released their first American album, Lay Down the Law, on 18 March 2008 upon completion of their US tour with New York-based band, The Bravery.

As well as receiving modest critical acclaim in the US, the group had several songs from the album being featured in US television and films, including the track "Lay Down the Law", which was featured in the film, Jumper, but is not present on the soundtrack album.

TV appearances include: The Album Chart Show (UK), Transmission (UK) and Jimmy Kimmel (US).

The group disbanded in late 2008. Founding members Matt Bishop and Ollie Thomas have since formed the band Flash Fiktion.

== Discography ==
=== EP's ===
- Message from Yuz 10 July 2006

=== Albums ===
- Heart Tuned to D.E.A.D. 23 April 2007 (UK No. 64)
- Lay Down the Law 18 March 2008
- Alternate Route To D.E.A.D. (A collection of demos and rarities)

=== Singles ===
Date	Single	Peak position	
Date	Single	UK	US
October 2006	"Lay Down the Law"		
January 2007	"Drama Queen"	61	
April 2007	"Lay Down the Law" (re-issue)	51	
March 2008	"Drama Queen"		9 (Singles sales)
