= In Miracle Land =

Studio album by The Vines
- Released: 29 June 2018
- Recorded: 2016–2017
- Genre: Alternative rock, garage rock, post-grunge, neo-psychedelia
- Length: 34:07
- Label: Wicked Nature Music
- Producer: Craig Nicholls

The Vines chronology
Wicked Nature (2014)	In Miracle Land (2018)

Singles from In Miracle Land
- 1. "In Miracle Land" Released: 1 April 2016

In Miracle Land is the seventh studio album by Australian alternative rock band The Vines. It was released on 29 June 2018 and was the band's second release under their own label Wicked Nature Music.

== Background ==
On 25 March 2016, the band posted a picture of Craig Nicholls in the studio playing guitar with the caption "Album #7 coming soon..." on their Facebook page. On 1 April 2016, the first single "In Miracle Land" was released.

In October 2016, the band played three shows in Australia for the 'In Miracle Land' Tour. During the tour, the band debuted new songs "Hate the Sound", "I Wanna Go Down", "Broken Heart", "Sky Gazer" and "Gone Wonder".

On 31 May 2018, it was announced via Facebook that the album In Miracle Land would be released 29 June 2018 and feature the same line-up as Wicked Nature.

In Miracle Land is the last album that was recorded with Tim John and Lachlan West.

== Track listing ==
No.	Title	Length
1.	"Hate the Sound"	2:44
2.	"Broken Heart"	2:30
3.	"Leave Me Alone"	2:15
4.	"Willow"	3:00
5.	"Emerald Ivy"	2:54
6.	"Sky Gazer"	4:00
7.	"Waitin"	1:40
8.	"Slide Away"	2:40
9.	"Annie Jane"	3:59
10.	"In Miracle Land"	2:36
11.	"I Wanna Go Down"	2:04
12.	"Gone Wonder"	3:38
Total length:		34:07

== Personnel ==
- Craig Nicholls – vocals, guitar, piano
- Tim John – bass
- Lachlan West – drums
