= David Olliffe =

Australian musician

- Also known as: David O'Leaf
- Born: David Vincent Olliffe; 3 November 1975 (age 51); Sydney, New South Wales, Australia
- Instruments: Vocals, drums, guitar

David Vincent Olliffe (born 3 November 1975) is an Australian musician, and the former drummer of The Vines. During the recordings of the band's debut album, Highly Evolved, Olliffe left citing creative differences with band management and the album's producer although it was reported on the band's website that "he didn't enjoy the touring lifestyle."

Before leaving, Olliffe had already recorded drum tracks for the songs "Highly Evolved", "Autumn Shade", "Outtathaway", "Sunshinin", "Homesick" (outro only), "Country Yard", "Mary Jane", and "1969" (which he also co-wrote).

Olliffe was also the drummer for Sydney's Theredsunband, however he is credited as "David O'Leaf" in the official site bio. He played with the Sydney outfit after Theredsunband's first drummer Kate Wilson (formerly of The Null Set and current drummer in The Laurels) left the band. Theredsunband's current line up does not include O'Leaf/Olliffe, who left shortly before the band recorded their first album Peapod.

In 2017 Olliffe has officially released his debut album under the name the Molotov Garage. It is available to listen to on YouTube. See The Silver Sky Run was written and recorded from within his time in the Vines up until over ten years since his departure from the band, and was co-produced with Simon Holmes, formerly of Sydney band the Hummingbirds, and Jeremy Smith who played in one of the later configurations of another Sydney band Glide.
