= Wicked Nature =

Studio album by the Vines
- Released: 2 September 2014
- Recorded: 2012–2013
- Genres: Alternative rock, garage rock, post-grunge, neo-psychedelia
- Length: 32:20 (disc one); 22:00 (disc two); 54:20 (total)
- Label: Wicked Nature Music
- Producers: Craig Nicholls and Paul McKercher

The Vines chronology
Future Primitive (2011)	Wicked Nature (2014)	In Miracle Land (2018)

Singles from Wicked Nature
- 1. "Metal Zone" Released: 10 July 2014

Professional ratings
Aggregate scores
Source	Rating
Metacritic	63/100
Review scores
Source	Rating
AllMusic	3/5 stars
Clash	2/10
DIY	3/5 stars
Drowned in Sound	4/10
FasterLouder	7/10 stars
The Guardian	3/5 stars
MusicOMH	3/5 stars
NME	7/10
Nothing But Hope And Passion	3/5
Rolling Stone Australia	3/5 stars

Wicked Nature is the sixth studio album by Australian alternative rock band the Vines. It was released on 2 September 2014. The double album is the band's first release under their own label Wicked Nature Music. The release marks a few milestones for The Vines, with frontman Craig Nicholls taking on the role of producer for the first time, as well as introducing a completely new rhythm section with drummer Lachlan West and bassist Tim John. Much of the funding for the album came from music funding website PledgeMusic.

== Background ==
In late 2011, drummer Hamish Rosser and guitarist Ryan Griffiths left the band, as did bassist Brad Heald in early 2012. On 16 March 2012, Rosser spoke to music website Faster Louder about the departure, saying "Part of the reason for falling out with Craig is that I've always enjoyed playing in more than one band at any given time," and that "this was always an issue with Craig." He also mentioned that the band had "broken up", although "Craig will always write great music in the future and he may choose to carry on under The Vines' name."

On 20 August 2012, a new line-up, consisting of Nicholls, drummer Lachlan West and bassist Tim John, entered the studio to record the band's sixth album. Originally intended to be a single album, the first disc was recorded with producer Paul McKercher at Sydney's Rancom Studios. Whilst mixing the album, the trio worked on songs for what would become the second disc. In 2013, the band entered Sydney's Jungle Studios with Lachlan Mitchell and recorded ten tracks over a five-day period.

On 2 July 2014, a new song, "Out the Loop" was made available on the band's SoundCloud page. On the same day, the band announced the PledgeMusic page for Wicked Nature and made 3 new songs available as a free download for those who pre-ordered the album. On 10 July, the video for lead single "Metal Zone" was released. The song has since reached #2 on Speciality Radio in the United States and the album debuted #29 on the ARIA Albums Charts in Australia.

== Track listing ==
All tracks are written by Craig Nicholls.

Disc one
No.	Title	Length
1.	"Metal Zone"	2:24
2.	"Ladybug"	2:29
3.	"Green Utopia"	2:25
4.	"Psychomatic"	2:02
5.	"Killin the Planet"	3:24
6.	"Anything You Say"	1:42
7.	"Venus Fly Trap"	2:34
8.	"Good Enough"	1:54
9.	"Out the Loop"	1:23
10.	"Rave It"	2:58
11.	"Wicked Nature"	4:35
12.	"Into the Fire"	4:00
Total length:		32:20

Disc two
No.	Title	Length
1.	"Reincarnation"	1:56
2.	"Love Is Gone"	1:52
3.	"Truth"	2:19
4.	"Slightly Alien"	2:14
5.	"Everything Else"	2:22
6.	"Fly Away"	1:41
7.	"Girl I Want"	2:22
8.	"Clueless"	1:59
9.	"Darkest Shadow"	2:05
10.	"Funny Thing"	3:39
Total length:		22:00

== Personnel ==
Personnel taken from Wicked Nature CD booklet.

The Vines

- Craig Nicholls – vocals, guitar, keyboards, percussion
- Tim John – bass, keyboards, percussion, backing vocals
- Lachlan West – drums, percussion, backing vocals

Technical personnel

- Craig Nicholls – production (all tracks), cover & inside painting, layout
- Paul McKercher – production and mixing (disc 1)
- Lachlan Mitchell – production, recording, engineering, and mixing (disc 2)
- Dylan Adams – recording assistance (disc 1)
- Sam Weston – mix assistance (disc 1)
- Dominic Givney – engineering assistance (disc 2)
- Owen Givney – engineering assistance (disc 2)
- Annie McKinnon – engineering assistance (disc 2)
- Steve Smart – mastering (all tracks)
- Jessica Chapnik Kahn – band shot
- Christopher Doyle – layout

== Chart performance ==
Chart (2014)	Peak position
Australian Albums (ARIA)	29
