= Casino Twilight Dogs =

Studio album by Youth Group
- Released: 15 July 2006
- Recorded: December 2005 – April 2006
- Studio: Velvet Studios, Sydney; Seedy Underbelly Studios, Los Angeles
- Genre: Indie rock
- Length: 41:15
- Label: Ivy League
- Producer: Wayne Connolly

Youth Group chronology
Skeleton Jar (2004)	Casino Twilight Dogs (2006)	The Night Is Ours (2008)

Singles from Casino Twilight Dogs
- 1. "Forever Young" Released: 27 February 2006; 2. "Catching & Killing" Released: 29 July 2006; 3. "Daisychains" Released: 19 September 2006 (promo only); 4. "Sorry" Released: 14 May 2007 (promo only)

Professional ratings
Review scores
Source	Rating
AllMusic	4/5 stars
Rolling Stone	3/5 stars
The Daily Telegraph	3.5/5 stars
The Australian	4/5 stars
The Sun-Herald	7/10
Herald Sun	3/5 stars
The Age	3/5 stars
Sunday Age	3/5 stars
Sunday Herald Sun	3/5 stars

Casino Twilight Dogs is the third studio album from Australian band Youth Group, released in Australia by Ivy League Records on 15 July 2006, then in the United States by ANTI- on 30 January 2007. The album came several months after the Australian chart success of the band's cover of Alphaville's "Forever Young", which had been recorded for the soundtrack of the US TV drama The O.C.. "Forever Young" had received extensive radio airplay and become a platinum-selling, No. 1 single in Australia, its success taking the band by surprise as they mixed Casino Twilight Dogs. The song, although different in style to their self-written material, was added as the album's final track.

The album includes one song, "The Destruction of Laurel Canyon", that details a 2005 mudslide in the famous Los Angeles neighbourhood; and another, "TJ", about Aboriginal teenager Thomas "TJ" Hickey, whose death led to the 2004 Redfern riots in Sydney. Drummer Danny Allen said "Start Today Tomorrow" was among a series of songs singer Toby Martin had often played at solo gigs—"ones we hadn't tackled that just sound good on their own with guitar and voice. I've been blown away when I've watched him play some of these songs and it's great one of them is on the record for others to have that experience."

A limited edition CD/DVD version of the album was also released in Australia. The US release of the album features a different track order and replaces "Let It Go" with "Christmas Windows". Music videos were produced for the singles "Forever Young", "Catching & Killing", and "Daisychains".

"Forever Young" was ranked No. 7 on the ARIA Charts list of top 100 singles for 2006; Casino Twilight Dogs peaked at No. 10 on the ARIA Albums Chart and is the band's highest-charting album. It reached No. 32 on the New Zealand Albums Chart.

== Track listing ==
All tracks are written by Youth Group except where noted

Australian version
No.	Title	Length
1.	"Catching & Killing"	3:12
2.	"On a String"	3:14
3.	"Let It Go"	3:10
4.	"Start Today Tomorrow"	3:25
5.	"Dead Zoo"	3:07
6.	"Under the Underpass"	3:29
7.	"Daisychains"	4:22
8.	"Sorry"	3:28
9.	"TJ"	2:37
10.	"The Destruction of Laurel Canyon"	5:04
11.	"Sicily"	2:13
12.	"Forever Young" (Marian Gold, Bernhard Lloyd, Frank Mertens)	3:59

US version
No.	Title	Length
1.	"On a String"	3:14
2.	"Sorry"	3:28
3.	"Catching & Killing"	3:12
4.	"Dead Zoo"	3:07
5.	"Under the Underpass"	3:29
6.	"Sicily"	2:13
7.	"Daisychains"	4:22
8.	"Forever Young" (Marian Gold, Bernhard Lloyd, Frank Mertens)	3:59
9.	"Start Today Tomorrow"	3:25
10.	"The Destruction of Laurel Canyon"	5:04
11.	"TJ"	2:37
12.	"Christmas Windows"	3:37

Limited edition bonus DVD
No.	Title	Length
1.	"Forever Young" (Video)
2.	"Shadowland" (Video)
3.	"Baby Body" (Video)

== Personnel ==
=== Youth Group ===
- Toby Martin – vocals, guitar
- Cameron Ellison-Elliott – guitar
- Patrick Matthews – bass
- Danny Lee Allen – drums

=== Additional personnel ===
- Tim Kevin – keyboards ("Under the Underpass", "Let It Go", "Sorry"), string arrangement ("Start Today Tomorrow")
- Matthew Steffen – double bass ("On a String")
- Shirley Simms – vocals ("Let It Go")
- Carol Kaye – bass, bass 6 ("Start Today Tomorrow")
- Atom – vocals ("The Destruction of Laurel Canyon")
- Wayne Connolly – 12 string, percussion
- Andrew Lancaster – synthesizer strings ("Forever Young")
- David McCormack – synthesizer strings ("Forever Young")
- Amanda Brown – violin
- Sophie Glasson – cello
- Rowan Smith – violin

== Charts ==
Chart performance for Casino Twilight Dogs
Chart (2006)	Peak position
Australian Albums (ARIA)	10
New Zealand Albums (RMNZ)	32
