= Anysound =

Single by The Vines

from the album Vision Valley
- Released: 19 August 2006 (Australia); 30 October 2006 (UK)
- Recorded: 2005
- Genre: Alternative rock
- Length: 1:56
- Label: EMI/Capitol
- Songwriter(s): Craig Nicholls
- Producer(s): Wayne Connolly

The Vines singles chronology
"Don't Listen to the Radio" (2006)	"Anysound" (2006)	"He's a Rocker" (2008)

"Anysound" is a rock song by The Vines from their 2006 album Vision Valley. The song's video, directed by Michel Gondry, involves puppets. It was played in episode 21 in season 3 of The O.C. It has also appeared in Thrillville: Off the Rails.

== Track listing ==
All tracks are written by Craig Nicholls

CD single
No.	Title	Producer(s)	Length
1.	"Anysound"	Wayne Connolly	1:57
2.	"Get Free" (country version)		3:04
3.	"Gross Out" (demo)		1:20
4.	"Going Gone" (demo)		2:46

== Charts ==
Chart performance for "Anysound"
Chart (2006)	Peak position
Australia (ARIA)	89
Scotland (OCC)	46
UK Singles (OCC)	63
