= Winning Days (song) =

Single by The Vines

from the album Winning Days
- Released: 24 May 2004
- Length: 3:33
- Label: EMI/Capitol
- Songwriter(s): Craig Nicholls
- Producer(s): Rob Schnapf

The Vines singles chronology
"Ride" (2004)	"Winning Days" (2004)	"Don't Listen to the Radio" (2006)

"Winning Days" is the third and final single from the album of the same name by the Vines. It appeared on the ARIA Singles Chart top 100 and the top 50 on the UK Singles Chart.

== Track listing ==
CD single
No.	Title	Writer(s)	Producer(s)	Length
1.	"Winning Days"	Craig Nicholls	Rob Schnapf	3:34
2.	"Landslide" (demo)			3:11
3.	"Watch the World" (demo)			2:36

== Charts ==
Chart performance for "Winning Days"
Chart (2004)	Peak position
Australia (ARIA)	65
Scotland (OCC)	47
UK Singles (OCC)	42
