= Daffo =

- Born: Gabi Gamberg
- Origin: Philadelphia
- Genres: Indie rock
- Years active: 2023-present
- Label: Concord Records
- Website: daffomusic.com

Daffo is the stage name of American indie rock musician Gabi Gamberg who is from Philadelphia and lives in Los Angeles. Gamberg uses they/them pronouns. As "Daffo", Gamberg has released an EP and a full-length album and is signed to Concord Records. A first EP, Pest, was released in 2023. In 2025, Gamberg released a debut full-length album under the "Daffo" moniker, titled Where the Earth Bends. The album was produced by Rob Schnapf who previously had produced records for Elliott Smith, whom Gamberg cites as being an influence.

== Discography ==
Studio albums

- Where the Earth Bends (2025, Concord Records)

EPs

- Pest (2023, Concord)
