= Potato Hole =

Studio album by Booker T.
- Released: April 21, 2009
- Recorded: September – October 2008
- Genres: R&B; electric blues
- Length: 43:42
- Label: Anti-
- Producers: Rob Schnapf; Booker T.

Booker T. chronology
| I Want You (1981) | Potato Hole (2009) | The Road from Memphis (2011) |

Professional ratings
Aggregate scores
| Source | Rating |
|---|---|
| Metacritic | 65/100 |
Review scores
| Source | Rating |
| AllMusic | 3.5/5 stars |
| Entertainment Weekly | B+ |
| Paste | 6.7/10 |
| Rolling Stone | 3/5 stars |

Potato Hole is a 2009 album by Booker T. Jones, recorded with Drive-By Truckers as the backing band and guitar accompaniment by Neil Young.

On January 31, 2010, Potato Hole won the Best Pop Instrumental Album award at the 52nd Annual Grammy Awards. The track "Warped Sister" was also nominated, for Best Rock Instrumental Performance, but that award went to Jeff Beck for "A Day in the Life".

== Track listing ==
All tracks written by Booker T. Jones; except as noted.

1. "Pound It Out" – 4:18
2. "She Breaks" – 4:22
3. "Hey Ya!" (André 3000) – 3:53
4. "Native New Yorker" – 3:47
5. "Nan" – 2:08
6. "Warped Sister" – 4:47
7. "Get Behind the Mule" (Tom Waits, Kathleen Brennan) – 4:10
8. "Reunion Time" – 3:49
9. "Potato Hole" – 6:50
10. "Space City" (Mike Cooley, Brad Morgan, Jason Isbell, Patterson Hood, Shonna Tucker) – 5:38

== Personnel ==
- Booker T. – organ, guitars (1, 5, 8)
- Mike Cooley – guitars
- Patterson Hood – guitars
- John Neff – guitars, pedal steel guitar
- Neil Young – guitars
- Shonna Tucker – bass guitar
- Brad Morgan – drums
- Lucy Castro – percussion

Technical

- Andy Kaulkin – executive producer
- Doug Boehm – engineer
- Jason Thrasher – photography
