= Urban & Eastern =

Album by Youth Group

Studio album by Youth Group
- Released: May 2000
- Recorded: 2000
- Studio: Paradise Studios, Woolloomooloo; Hothouse Studio, St Kilda
- Genre: Rock
- Length: 51:01
- Label: Ivy League Records
- Producer: Wayne Connolly

Youth Group chronology
Urban & Eastern (2000)	Skeleton Jar (2004)

Professional ratings
Review scores
Source	Rating
Sydney Morning Herald	3/5 stars
The Age	4/5 stars
The Courier-Mail	4/5 stars

Urban & Eastern is the debut album by Australian rock band Youth Group. The album, recorded with producer Wayne Connolly, was released in 2000.

Songwriter Toby Martin said his compositions were influenced by You Am I's Tim Rogers, particularly on that band's Hourly Daily album. In Urban & Eastern's opening track, "Blue Leaves, Red Dust," he sang: "No more songs of Tallahassee and Nashville, there are songs here right outside the windowsill." He told The Sydney Morning Herald: "I like music that has a strong sense of place in it. I like realism and like lyrics that seem like they're coming from a real place."

By 2004, when the band's follow-up album was released, Martin was distancing himself from the debut. "The whole attitude and the sound is kind of naive to me now—charmingly naive, I hope," he said. "Urban & Eastern was a bit more raucous—longer songs, more elaborate arrangements. What were we thinking? We were young, we were arrogant, we thought the world was ours. I'm much, much happier with this one." Martin said the limited-release debut album had become a rarity, telling one newspaper: "It's almost impossible (to find it)—I don't even have a copy at the moment."

== Track listing ==
(All songs by Toby Martin and Youth Group except where noted)

1. "Blue Leaves, Red Dust" – 7:10
2. "Happiness' Border" – 3:12
3. "Appliance, Compliance" – 3:35
4. "Guilty" – 2:53
5. "Booth Street" – 4:07
6. "Eric Sleeps" (Dan Allen, Youth Group) – 0:32
7. "My Soul Takes Flight" (Andy Cassell, Youth Group) – 3:21
8. "Eight" – 2:26
9. "Negative Hearing" – 3:06
10. "I Don't Care"– 2:36
11. "Instant Charmer" – 3:22
12. "Spry Griever" (Cassell, Youth Group) – 7:31
13. "Song for Eric"– 7:07

== Personnel ==
- Dan Allen — drums
- Andy Cassell — bass
- Paul Murphy — guitar
- Toby Martin — guitar

=== Additional personnel ===
- Jason Walker — pedal steel
- Michelle Outram — cello
- Wayne Connolly — noises, shaking
