= Vision Valley =

Studio album by The Vines
- Released: 1 April 2006
- Recorded: July–November 2005
- Studio: BJB Studios, Sydney, Australia
- Genre: Alternative rock; garage rock; post-grunge; neo-psychedelia
- Length: 31:29
- Label: EMI; Capitol
- Producer: Wayne Connolly; The Vines

The Vines chronology
Winning Days (2004)	Vision Valley (2006)	The Best of The Vines (2008)

Singles from Vision Valley
- 1. "Gross Out" Released: March 2006 (radio promo); 2. "Don't Listen to the Radio" Released: 10 April 2006; 3. "Anysound" Released: 19 August 2006; 4. "Dope Train" Released: April 2007 (video promo)

Vision Valley is the third studio album by Australian rock band The Vines. It was released on 1 April 2006 through EMI Records. It is the band's first album without bass guitarist Patrick Matthews who left the band in 2004.

== Recording and mixing ==
Vision Valley was recorded at Electric Avenue, Velvet Sound, Big Jesus Burger, and NikiNali studios in Sydney, Australia. It was mixed at Velvet Sound and Electric Avenue and it was assisted by Veit Mahler, Jason Lea. At Velvet Sound, it was assisted by Dan Clinch and Anthony The and by Peter Farley and Jodie Wallance at BJB. Vision Valley was mastered by Don Bartley at Studio 301 in Sydney, Australia.

== Release ==
In the United States, the album debuted at No. 136 on the Billboard 200 chart, selling 7,839 units. In Canada, the album debuted at No. 93. "Anysound" and "Spaceship" appeared in season 3 of The O.C. in episodes 21 and 24 respectively.

This album has been released with the Copy Control protection system in some regions.

== Reception ==
Professional ratings
Aggregate scores
Source	Rating
Metacritic	64/100
Review scores
Source	Rating
Allmusic	3/5 stars
Billboard	3/5 stars
Blender	3/5 stars
Entertainment Weekly	B+
The Guardian	4/5 stars
NME	7/10
Pitchfork	3.4/10
Rolling Stone	2.5/5 stars
Slant Magazine	1/5 stars
Uncut	4/5 stars

The album received generally positive reviews from many critics. Music publications such as Q and NME respectively gave the album 4/5 stars and 7/10. Q had Vision Valley at number 69 in their Albums of 2006 Poll, dubbing the songs "superior grunge anthems". Entertainment Weekly gave the album a positive review and wrote "[Nicholls'] feral, melodic garage punk is refreshing".

In their negative review, Pitchfork wrote "what the Vines offer on their third album is permutations and refinements on what they've been doing since whenever. On the stupid loud songs, Craig Nicholls sounds like a bored Kurt Cobain. On the stupid slow songs, Craig Nicholls sounds like a bored Liam Gallagher (which is pretty impressive, given Gallagher's innate inertia)", though that "there's nothing musically offputting about this record, unless relentless mediocrity in the three-chord arts is a capital crime." Slant Magazine wrote "The Vines ultimately come off as nothing more than a proficient Nirvana cover band, lacking a perspective of their own or a voice that really demands attention." PopMatters wrote "The Vines are polished so shiny by Capitol on their new record you can see yourself in the reflective, glossy black of the CD booklet" and called the album "a straight-ahead album of short, disposable garage-rock." Drowned in Sound wrote "It is rare to stumble across a record that passes through the air as plainly and unobtrusively as this."

== Track listing ==
All tracks are written by Craig Nicholls.

No.	Title	Length
1.	"Anysound"	1:55
2.	"Nothin's Comin'"	2:00
3.	"Candy Daze"	1:40
4.	"Vision Valley"	2:42
5.	"Don't Listen to the Radio"	2:10
6.	"Gross Out"	1:18
7.	"Take Me Back"	2:42
8.	"Going Gone"	2:44
9.	"Fuk Yeh"	1:58
10.	"Futuretarded"	1:47
11.	"Dope Train"	2:36
12.	"Atmos"	1:50
13.	"Spaceship"	6:07

=== Limited edition DVD ===
1. "Highly Evolved"
2. "Get Free"
3. "Outtathaway"
4. "Homesick"
5. "Ride"
6. "Winning Days"
7. "Gross Out"
8. "Studio Walkthrough with Wayne Connolly"

== Personnel ==
The Vines

- Craig Nicholls – vocals, guitars, percussion, keyboards, bass guitar on "Futuretarded"
- Ryan Griffiths – guitars, keyboards, percussion, backing vocals
- Hamish Rosser – drums, percussion, backing vocals

Additional musicians

- Andy Kent – bass guitar
- Tim Kevin – string arrangements, piano, organ
- Nic Dalton – electric mandolin
- Amanda Brown – violin
- Rowan Smith – violin
- Sophie Glasson – cello

Production

- Wayne Connolly – production, recording, mixing
- Dan Clinch – additional engineering
- Anthony The – additional engineering
- Veit Mahler – additional engineering

== Charts ==
Chart (2006)	Peak position
Australian Albums (ARIA)	14
French Albums (SNEP)	152
Swiss Albums (Schweizer Hitparade)	94
UK Albums (Official Charts)	71
US Billboard 200	136
