= Ride (The Vines song) =

2004 song by the Vines

Single by the Vines

from the album Winning Days
- B-side: "Drown the Baptists"; "Don't Go"
- Released: 9 February 2004
- Length: 2:36
- Label: EngineRoom Music; Capitol
- Songwriter: Craig Nicholls
- Producer: Rob Schnapf

The Vines singles chronology
| "Fuck the World" (2003) | "Ride" (2004) | "Winning Days" (2004) |

"Ride" is the second single from Australian band the Vines' second album, Winning Days (2004). It reached the top 50 in Australia, Canada, and the United Kingdom, as well as on the US Billboard Modern Rock Tracks chart. In Australia, the song was ranked No. 94 on Triple J's Hottest 100 of 2004.

== Music video ==
The "Ride" music video, directed by Michel Gondry, shows the band playing by themselves in a hall. When they get to the chorus, bands appear from everywhere, helping them sing and play.

== Track listings ==
All tracks are written by Craig Nicholls.

Australian and New Zealand CD single
| No. | Title | Producer(s) | Length |
|---|---|---|---|
| 1. | "Ride" (album version) | Rob Schnapf | 2:37 |
| 2. | "Drown the Baptists" | Schnapf | 2:40 |
| 3. | "Don't Go" | The Vines | 2:50 |

UK 7-inch single and Canadian CD single
| No. | Title | Producer(s) | Length |
|---|---|---|---|
| 1. | "Ride" | Schnapf | 2:34 |
| 2. | "Drown the Baptists" | Schnapf | 2:05 |

== Charts ==
=== Weekly charts ===
| Chart (2004) | Peak position |
|---|---|
| Australia (ARIA) | 44 |
| Canada (Nielsen SoundScan) | 17 |
| Canada Rock Top 30 (Radio & Records) | 21 |
| Scotland Singles (OCC) | 25 |
| UK Singles (OCC) | 25 |
| US Alternative Airplay (Billboard) | 13 |

=== Year-end charts ===
| Chart (2004) | Position |
|---|---|
| US Modern Rock Tracks (Billboard) | 63 |

== Release history ==
| Region | Date | Format(s) | Label(s) | Ref. |
|---|---|---|---|---|
| United States | 9 February 2004 | Active rock; alternative radio | Capitol | |
| Australia | 8 March 2004 | CD | EngineRoom Music; Capitol | |
| United Kingdom | 8 March 2004 | 7-inch vinyl; CD | Heavenly | |
