= Skeleton Jar =

Studio album by Youth Group
- Released: 22 March 2004 (Australia); 24 May 2005 (US)
- Studio: Velvet Studios, Big Jesus Burger Studios, Razor's Edge Studios, Tiger Studios
- Genre: Indie rock, alternative rock
- Length: 41:21
- Label: Ivy League Records; Epitaph Records
- Producer: Wayne Connolly

Youth Group chronology
Urban & Eastern (2001)	Skeleton Jar (2004)	Casino Twilight Dogs (2006)

Alternative cover
- Australian Re-release cover

Professional ratings
Review scores
Source	Rating
Allmusic	3.5/5 stars
The Age	2.5/5 stars
The Australian	3.5/5 stars
Sunday Age	4.5/5 stars
Sydney Morning Herald	3.5/5 stars
Sunday Herald Sun	4/5 stars
The Age	3.5/5 stars

Skeleton Jar is the second album by Australian rock band Youth Group. It was first released in Australia on 22 March 2004, and on 24 May 2005 on Epitaph Records in the United States with a re-arranged track listing and one new song. The US version was released in Australia as a "repackaged" album in July 2004. In 2011 the album was voted #98 on Australian radio station Triple J's Hottest 100 Australian Albums of All Time (Industry List).

The album marked a transition point for the band, whose lineup had been stable for the first six years. "All of a sudden everything's gone kind of haywire," songwriter and singer-guitarist Toby Martin said.

Martin said the album added a strong folk flavour to the band's rock roots. He told the Herald Sun: "I've definitely been listening to more older stuff in the time leading up to recording this record—like Dylan and the Velvet Underground. I really like country and folk music, so I think it's always going to come through. Maybe this time it's come through in a more authentic way, rather than playing with a genre, just playing it because we like it. I think the guitar-picking stuff on this record mostly comes from Bob Dylan or Nick Drake and that sort of stuff, more folk kind of things."

Music videos were produced for the singles "Skeleton Jar," "Shadowland" and "Baby Body."

== Track listing ==
All songs by Youth Group.

2004 version
No.	Title	Length
1.	"Shadowland"	3:37
2.	"Last Quarter"	2:27
3.	"Lillian Lies"	3:02
4.	"Why Don't the Buildings Cry?"	3:53
5.	"Baby Body"	3:53
6.	"Drowned"	4:19
7.	"Piece of Wood"	3:10
8.	"Rosie and the Sea"	3:00
9.	"The Frankston Line"	3:46
10.	"Skeleton Jar"	3:55
11.	"See-Saw"	6:43

2005 version
No.	Title	Length
1.	"Shadowland"	3:37
2.	"Skeleton Jar"	3:55
3.	"Lillian Lies"	3:02
4.	"The Frankston Line"	3:46
5.	"Baby Body"	3:53
6.	"See-Saw"	6:43
7.	"Drowned"	4:19
8.	"Last Quarter"	2:27
9.	"Someone Else's Dream"	2:36
10.	"Why Don't the Buildings Cry?"	3:53
11.	"Piece of Wood"	3:10

== Notes ==
- The song deleted from the 2005 release, "Rosie and the Sea," appeared on the band's "Shadowland" single.
- The song "Someone Else's Dream" on the 2005 release was later issued on the band's "Forever Young" single in February 2006.

== Personnel ==
- Toby Martin – vocals, guitar
- Danny Lee Allen – drums
- Andy Cassell – bass
- Johnno Lattin – bass
- Paul Murphy – lead guitar

=== Additional personnel ===
- Wayne Connolly – pedal steel
