= Flash Fiktion =

English indie electronic band

- Origin: London, United Kingdom
- Genres: Indie rock, indie pop, indie electronic
- Years active: 2009–2013
- Labels: Split Records (United Kingdom), Vinyl Junkie (Japan), Rough Trade (EU)
- Members: Matt Rokk; Oliver Thomas; Daniel Peranic

Flash Fiktion are an indie electronic band from London, England. Their debut album was released in 2012.

== Biography ==
Flash Fiktion formed in 2009 by former Switches members Matt Bishop and Ollie Thomas. The group released its first single, "Leni" in the summer of 2010. The single became playlisted and featured as 'Hot Single of the Week' on XFM Radio. Following single 'Capsules of Sun' quickly became a favourite with major radio DJs such as Huw Stephens, Zane Lowe, Annie Mac and has earned them four weeks of consecutive plays from Nick Grimshaw and daytime plays from Edith Bowman.The band promoted their forthcoming album by UK touring with The Bravery and Young Knives, extensive EU touring and festival appearances next to Bastille and Mark Ronson. Their debut album was released in March 2012 on Split Records in the UK/EU, Vinyl Junkie in Japan and was published by Chrysalis/BMG. Album received critical acclaim from major publications: 'Vivacious, modernist, glam crackers!’ – NME, 'Disturbing messages from a Dystopian future' – Q Magazine, 'Pop perfection' – The Sunday Times, 'Riotous debut with a rare spark' – The Guardian. XFM Radio nominated the album for the Best British Debut of 2012.

== Discography ==
=== Singles ===
"Leni" (2010)
"Capsules of Sun" (2011)
"Me And Mr E" (2011)
"Artificial Colours" (2011)
"Starry Glow" (2012)
"Baptised" (2013)

=== Albums ===
"Flash Fiktion " (05/03/2012)
