= Insound =

Online music store

- Website type: Music retail
- Headquarters: Brooklyn, New York
- Founders: Christian Anthony; Matt Wishnow; Ari Sass
- Parent: Warner Music Group
- Website: www.insound.com
- Launched: 1999
- Current status: Inactive

Insound was an online music store. Insound carried CD, vinyl, hard to find items, music accessories and merchandise. The company was located in New York, New York.

== History ==
Insound was founded in 1998 by Christian Anthony, Matt Wishnow and Ari Sass. Wishnow and Sass had worked together at Elektra. The site took six months to build and first launched on March 1, 1999. The company gradually gained notoriety through its reviews, online zines and promotion of then-small bands such as Death Cab for Cutie. Insound also gained visibility through hosting events at CMJ and South by Southwest (SXSW).

Insound became profitable in 2003. In 2008, more than half of the company's sales come from selling vinyl records, which had made a resurgence in the past decade.

In January 2008, the retailer was acquired by Alternative Distribution Alliance, an independent distributor owned by the Warner Music Group.

On March 19, 2015, ADA disbanded Insound but in October of the same year, the online music retailer was revived by the Warner Music Group and was selling a broad-range of music related products at a discounted price. By April 2020, Insound redirected to the Warner Music Group official store.
