= Future Primitive (The Vines album) =

Studio album by The Vines
- Released: 3 June 2011
- Recorded: February 2010–early 2011
- Studio: Studios 301 (Sydney, Australia)
- Genre: Alternative rock, garage rock, neo-psychedelia
- Length: 34:08
- Label: Sony Music Entertainment
- Producer: Christopher Colonna

The Vines chronology
Melodia (2008)	Future Primitive (2011)	Wicked Nature (2014)

Singles from Future Primitive
- 1. "Gimme Love" Released: 2011; 2. "Future Primitive" Released: 2011

Professional ratings
Review scores
Source	Rating
Allmusic	3/5 stars
PopMatters	4/10 stars
Sputnikmusic	3/5 stars
Zoo Weekly	3.5/5 stars

Future Primitive is the fifth studio album by Australian alternative rock band The Vines. It was released on 3 June 2011.

== Background ==
The majority of the album was recorded at Studios 301 in Sydney, Australia during February and March 2010 with producer Christopher Colonna of The Bumblebeez. Additional recording and production touch-ups occurred throughout the following year (2010 – early 2011) whilst the band shopped the album to potential record labels, as they were without a label at the time having financed the recording sessions themselves. The band signed to Sony Music Australia for the release.

Lead track "Gimme Love" is the opening track of The Inbetweeners Movie.

"Black Dragon" and "Goodbye" are used in the opening titles of Borderlands: The Pre-Sequel.

== Track listing ==
All tracks are written by Craig Nicholls, except where noted.

No.	Title	Length
1.	"Gimme Love"	1:52
2.	"Leave Me in the Dark"	1:59
3.	"Candy Flippin' Girl"	2:32
4.	"A.S.4"	3:20
5.	"Weird Animals"	2:01
6.	"Cry"	2:36
7.	"Future Primitive"	1:54
8.	"Riverview Avenue"	2:03
9.	"Black Dragon"	3:29
10.	"All That You Do"	3:33
11.	"Outro"	3:47
12.	"Goodbye"	2:14
13.	"S.T.W."	2:19

Bonus tracks
No.	Title	Writer(s)	Length
14.	"Vacant Video" (thevines.com order)		2:48
15.	"I Bet You Look Good on the Dancefloor" (Arctic Monkeys cover; Japanese edition bonus track)	Alex Turner	3:28

== Charts ==
Chart (2011)	Peak position
Australian ARIA Albums Chart	24

== Tour dates ==
Date	City	Country	Venue
1st leg: Australia
22 June 2011	Mount Lawley	Australia	Astor Theatre
25 August 2011	Byron Bay	Australia	The Northern
26 August 2011	Brisbane	Australia	HiFi Bar
27 August 2011	Sydney	Australia	The Metro Theatre
1 September 2011	Wollongong	Australia	Wollongong Uni Bar
2 September 2011	Newcastle	Australia	The Cambridge
3 September 2011	Melbourne	Australia	The Hifi
9 September 2011	Adelaide	Australia	Governor Hindmarsh Hotel
10 September 2011	Perth	Australia	Capitol

== Personnel ==
The Vines

- Craig Nicholls – vocals, guitars
- Ryan Griffiths – guitars, backing vocals
- Hamish Rosser – drums, percussion
- Brad Heald – bass guitar, backing vocals

Additional personnel

- Christopher Colonna – recording, production, mixing
- Mike Morgan – engineer
- Julien Delfaud – mixing at Motorbass Studio, Paris, France
- Jono Ma – additional programming
- Leif Podhajsky – album cover artwork
- Cybele Malinowski – photography
