= Don't Listen to the Radio =

Single by the Vines

from the album Vision Valley
- Released: 10 April 2006
- Recorded: 2005
- Genre: Alternative rock, garage punk, indie pop
- Length: 2:12
- Label: EMI/Capitol Records
- Songwriter: Craig Nicholls
- Producer: Wayne Connolly

The Vines singles chronology
"Winning Days" (2004)	"Don't Listen to the Radio" (2006)	"Anysound" (2006)

"Don't Listen to the Radio" is a single from Australian rock band the Vines' third album Vision Valley. It was a minor hit in the UK and Australia, reaching positions of 66 and 46 on the countries' respective singles charts. It was featured on the soundtrack of the video game FlatOut 2, and was also used in the game Thrillville.

== Track listing ==
Australian CD
No.	Title	Writer(s)	Producer(s)	Length
1.	"Don't Listen to the Radio"	Craig Nicholls	Wayne Connolly	2:10
2.	"Give Up, Give Out, Give In"			3:03
3.	"Don't Listen to the Radio" (instrumental)	Nicholls	Connolly	2:10

UK CD
No.	Title	Writer(s)	Producer(s)	Length
1.	"Don't Listen to the Radio"	Craig Nicholls	Wayne Connolly	2:12
2.	"Lawman" (demo)			2:09

All tracks are written by Craig Nicholls.

Vinyl 1: Side A
No.	Title	Producer(s)	Length
1.	"Don't Listen to the Radio"	Wayne Connolly

Vinyl 1: Side B
No.	Title	Length
2.	"Fuk Yeh" (live)

All tracks are written by Craig Nicholls.

Vinyl 2: Side A
No.	Title	Producer(s)	Length
1.	"Don't Listen to the Radio"	Wayne Connolly

Vinyl 2: Side B
No.	Title	Length
2.	"Nothin's Comin'" (live)

== Charts ==
Chart performance for "Don't Listen to the Radio"
Chart (2006)	Peak position
Australia (ARIA)	46
Scotland Singles (OCC)	40
UK Singles (OCC)	66
