= The Night Is Ours (album) =

Studio album by Youth Group
- Released: 30 June 2008 (Australia); 7 April 2009 (US)
- Recorded: 2008
- Studio: The mess hall, the Coal Loader Site, Waverton; on board the Cape Don MV; Velvet Studios, Sydney
- Genre: Indie rock
- Length: 38:15
- Label: Ivy League; World's Fair
- Producer: Tim Kevin, Anthony The, Youth Group

Youth Group chronology
Casino Twilight Dogs (2006)	The Night Is Ours (2008)

Professional ratings
Review scores
Source	Rating
Herald Sun	3.5/5 stars
Sunday Age	4/5 stars
Sunday Herald Sun	4.5/5 stars
Sunday Telegraph	4/5 stars
The Daily Telegraph	4/5 stars
The Courier-Mail	4/5 stars
Beat Magazine	very favourable link

The Night Is Ours is the fourth studio album by Australian rock band Youth Group, released in Australia in June 2008 and in the US in April 2009. The album features guest musician Chris Walla of Death Cab for Cutie, who mixed four tracks and also provided additional guitar and backing vocals.

The band recorded the album in a near-derelict 1920s mess hall on Sydney Harbour, which they had rented from the local council at a rate cheap enough to allow them to take their time to develop the songs. Songwriter Toby Martin said the songs were only basic sketches in his head when the group entered the makeshift studio, with the idea being that the whole band would workshop the songs together. "We were very conscious of not losing spontaneity on this album," Martin told the Sunday Herald Sun. "Even though we did a lot of overdubs, we spent a long time on this record because we didn't want to demo the songs first. We wanted to write and arrange the songs in the studio, so recording the album would be capturing the moment of creation rather than capturing the moment of recreation. So we had roughly a week per song—I normally had the lyrics and a bit of a rough idea, or Cameron would have a riff, and by the end of the week we would be putting it down."

The melancholy of the recording venue was reflected in much of the material, which tackled issues such as addiction, grief, desperation and death. Martin commented: "It's a fairly contemplative record, which might have something to do with being by the water, but it also has a slightly creepy or paranoid edge. It's a bit out of the way and there are owls and rats, and old falling down walls, so I think it did influence the record. When I finished recording the record I didn't think it had influenced us much at all, but listening to it later and hearing some of my friends' comments, I was beginning to see how it had rubbed off on to us in a way we hadn't really planned."

== Track listing ==
No.	Title	Length
1.	"Good Time"	3:06
2.	"One for Another"	4:05
3.	"Two Sides"	3:06
4.	"Dying at Your Own Party"	4:05
5.	"All This Will Pass"	4:20
6.	"Friedrichstrasse"	3:49
7.	"A Sign"	4:10
8.	"Babies in Your Dreams"	3:06
9.	"In My Dreams"	5:06
10.	"What Is a Life?"	3:42

US iTunes bonus tracks
No.	Title	Length
11.	"The Night Is Ours"	2:41
12.	"Afraid of the Dark"	4:06

== Singles ==
- "Two Sides" (April 2008)
- "All This Will Pass" (September 2008)
- "In My Dreams" (December 2008)

== Personnel ==
- Toby Martin – vocals, guitar
- Cameron Emerson-Elliott – guitar
- Patrick Matthews – bass
- Danny Lee Allen – drums

=== Additional personnel ===
- Tim Kevin – string and horn arrangements, piano, organ, backing vocals, guitar
- Danny Heifetz – trumpet
- Sam Golding – trumpet, valve trombone, tenor horn
- Ian Pieterse – baritone sax
- Amanda Brown – solo violin
- String trio: Amanda Brown and Jeremy Kong – violin; Sophie Glasson – cello
- Jason Walker – pedal steel guitar
- Johnno Lattin – squeeze box
- Don Lennon – vocals ("What Is a Life?")
- Chris Walla – extra guitar, backing vocals, noises ("Two Sides")

== Charts ==
Chart performance for The Night Is Ours
Chart (2008)	Peak position
Australian Albums (ARIA)	66
