= Heart Tuned to D.E.A.D. =

Studio album by Switches
- Released: 23 April 2007
- Recorded: August–December 2006
- Genre: Indie rock
- Length: 41:19
- Label: Atlantic
- Producer: Rob Schnapf

Lay Down the Law cover

Professional ratings
Review scores
Source	Rating
Allmusic	4/5 stars
Q	p. 115, July 2007

Heart Tuned to D.E.A.D. is the only album by the British indie rock band Switches. It was released in the UK on 23 April 2007. The album was released in the US as Lay Down the Law on March 18, 2008, with the omission of "Give Up the Ghost".The title is a possible reference to the Super Furry Animals song "Bass Tuned to D.E.A.D".

The album currently holds a 76/100 metascore at Metacritic.

== Track listing ==
1. "Drama Queen" – 2:59
2. "Snakes and Ladders" – 3:37
3. "Lay Down the Law" – 2:45
4. "Coming Down" – 3:19
5. "Give Up the Ghost" – 3:23
6. "The Need to Be Needed" – 3:34
7. "Message from Yuz" – 2:41
8. "Every Second Counts" – 3:32
9. "Step Kids in Love" – 3:19
10. "Lovin' It" – 3:40
11. "Killer Karma" – 3:59
12. "Testify" – 4:23

== Lay Down the Law Track listing ==
1. "Drama Queen" – 2:59
2. "Snakes and Ladders" – 3:37
3. "Lay Down the Law" – 2:45
4. "Coming Down" – 3:19
5. "The Need to Be Needed" – 3:34
6. "Message from Yuz" – 2:41
7. "Every Second Counts" – 3:32
8. "Step Kids in Love" – 3:19
9. "Lovin' It" – 3:40
10. "Killer Karma" – 3:59
11. "Testify" – 4:23

== Charts ==
Chart performance for Heart Tuned to D.E.A.D.
Chart (2007)	Peak position
Scottish Albums (OCC)	88
UK Albums (OCC)	64
UK Album Downloads (OCC)	46
