= Get Free (The Vines song) =

2002 single by The Vines

Single by the Vines

from the album Highly Evolved
- Released: 17 June 2002
- Genre: Garage rock
- Length: 2:06
- Label: EMI, Capitol
- Songwriter: Craig Nicholls
- Producer: Rob Schnapf

The Vines singles chronology
| "Highly Evolved" (2002) | "Get Free" (2002) | "Outtathaway!" (2002) |

"Get Free" is a song by the Australian garage rock band the Vines from their debut album Highly Evolved. The song was released in mid-2002 and remains one of the Vines' highest-charting single, peaking at number seven on the US Billboard Modern Rock Tracks chart and number 24 on the UK Singles Chart.

== Composition ==
"Get Free" features Nicholls strumming the 5th and 3rd frets for the main riff. The song opens with the resounding riff, a drum-build up and then the song breaks in. However, the song does not follow a verse-chorus-verse structure, going from verse-chorus-solo-verse-bridge-middle-verse-chorus.

== Music videos ==
"We got these dirt bombs in our hair. It was like, whoa. I mean, I thought I didn't want to be a rock star before, but when I did that video and the explosions were going off, something inside me just [changed]."

— Craig Nicholls on the making of Get Free Music Video

There were two promotional videos shot for "Get Free". The more commonly known music video, directed by Roman Coppola, shows the band standing, surrounded by huge spotlights, on a hill with a lightning storm brewing above. As the video develops, lightning bolts begin to strike the ground with increasing intensity. Eventually, during the final chorus, lightning strikes the drummer Hamish Rosser's cymbal, bassist Patrick Matthews and then Nicholls sending Matthews and Nicholls flying in different directions while the drummer sits behind his set.

== Later use ==
Get Free was used in many different medias such as:

The opening video of the tennis game Top Spin

It was inserted in one of American musician Weird Al polka medleys, "Angry White Boy Polka".

In 2025, the song was used as the closing song for the credits of an episode of Daredevil: Born Again.

== Track listings ==
CD single
| No. | Title | Writer(s) | Producer(s) | Length |
|---|---|---|---|---|
| 1. | "Get Free" | Craig Nicholls | Rob Schnapf | 2:06 |
| 2. | "Down at the Club" (Zen Demo) | | | 2:54 |
| 3. | "Hot Leather" (Zen Demo) | | | 1:57 |

7-inch vinyl
| No. | Title | Writer(s) | Producer(s) | Length |
|---|---|---|---|---|
| 1. | "Get Free" | Craig Nicholls | Rob Schnapf | 2:06 |
| 2. | "Blues Riff" (Zen Demo) | | | 3:43 |

== Personnel ==
Personnel taken from Highly Evolved CD booklet.

The Vines

- Craig Nicholls – vocals, guitar, percussion
- Patrick Matthews – bass

Additional musicians

- Joey Waronker – drums
- Ethan Johns – additional percussion
- Steven Rhodes – additional percussion

== Charts ==
| Chart (2002) | Peak position |
|---|---|
| Australia (ARIA) | 44 |
| Scotland Singles (OCC) | 22 |
| UK Singles (OCC) | 24 |
| US Bubbling Under Hot 100 (Billboard) | 22 |
| US Alternative Airplay (Billboard) | 7 |
| US Mainstream Rock (Billboard) | 27 |
