= Highly Evolved (song) =

Single by the Vines

from the album Highly Evolved
- Released: 22 April 2002
- Recorded: 2001
- Genre: Alternative rock, garage rock revival, post-grunge
- Length: 1:34
- Label: Capitol
- Songwriter(s): Craig Nicholls
- Producer(s): Rob Schnapf

The Vines singles chronology
"Factory" (2001)	"Highly Evolved" (2002)	"Get Free" (2002)

"Highly Evolved" is the opening track and first Australian single from the Vines' debut album of the same name. The song was written by the group's lead guitarist and vocalist, Craig Nicholls. It was issued as a single via Capitol Records, in April 2002, ahead of the album, which appeared in August.

== Critical reviews ==
"Highly Evolved" was single of the week in March 2002 in NME. In the magazine's review, James Oldham stated that it is "scorched, ragged and super heavy, "Highly Evolved" takes 'Bleach'-era Nirvana as its starting point and then proceeds to compress the whole of Kurt Cobain's career into a blistering minute and a half. It's a totally brilliant record.

Chris Dahlen of Pitchfork described the song as being "fine grunge, switching from bare strumming to throbbing, jagged, yet infectious guitar lines." Allmusic's Heather Phares states ""Highly Evolved"'s primal beat and chunky guitars are certainly post-grunge, but not in the boringly earnest, imitative way that bands such as Silverchair were—the song's sludgy sexiness and tight structure also recall the '60s garage punk that shaped bands like Nirvana and Mudhoney."

Alexis Petridis commented in The Guardian that the song is "compact and ferocious, powered along by Nicholls's purging scream." Sputnikmusic states that the song is a "great choice for an opening track. The guitar riff is very dirty but matches the songs style about being able to "buy love, from a pay phone". The song finishes with a neat mini guitar solo."

PopMatters' Jon Garrett described it as "a pleasant blast of Nevermind-era Nirvana", with "frontman Craig Nicholls rumbling cadence often eerily mimics Cobain's."

== Music video ==
The video opens with the message "A lot can happen in 90 seconds, use your imagination" in white letters on a black screen. Then, a pressure gauge appears and a timer begins to count down from 90 seconds in the lower right hand corner. In the last 30 seconds, the gauge goes into the red as the timer begins to buzz around the screen before the artist and song names appear at the end of the video.

== Track listing ==
CD single
No.	Title	Writer(s)	Producer(s)	Length
1.	"Highly Evolved"	Craig Nicholls	Rob Schnapf	1:35
2.	"Sunchild" (Zen Demo)			4:08

== Charts ==
Chart performance for "Highly Evolved"
Chart (2002)	Peak position
Australia (ARIA)	97
Scotland (OCC)	39
UK Singles (OCC)	32
