= Winning Days =

Studio album by The Vines
- Released: March 2004
- Recorded: Summer 2003
- Studio: Bearsville (Woodstock, New York)
- Genre: Alternative rock; garage rock; post-grunge; neo-psychedelia
- Length: 38:28
- Label: Capitol
- Producer: Rob Schnapf

The Vines chronology
| Highly Evolved (2002) | Winning Days (2004) | Vision Valley (2006) |

Singles from Winning Days
- 1. "Fuck the World" Released: 15 December 2003; 2. "Ride" Released: 8 March 2004; 3. "Winning Days" Released: 24 May 2004

Professional ratings
Aggregate scores
| Source | Rating |
|---|---|
| Metacritic | 50/100 |
Review scores
| Source | Rating |
| AllMusic | 2.5/5 stars |
| Billboard | 4/5 stars |
| Blender | 3.5/5 stars |
| Entertainment Weekly | B |
| The Guardian | 2/5 stars |
| NME | 5/10 stars |
| Pitchfork | 2.7/10 |
| Rolling Stone | 3/5 stars |
| Uncut | 2/5 stars |
| The Village Voice | C+ |

Winning Days is the second studio album by Australian alternative rock band The Vines, and was released in March 2004. It is the follow-up to their debut, Highly Evolved. The enhanced CD has the music video for "Ride". Winning Days was recorded in the summer of 2003 at Bearsville Studios in Woodstock, New York. and was assisted by Bill Synans. It was mixed in September 2003 at Cello Studios in Los Angeles and was assisted by Steven Rhodes.

This album has been released with the Copy Control protection system in some regions.

== History ==
The Vines recorded Winning Days in May 2003 at Bearsville Studios with producer Rob Schnapf, who had also produced their debut album Highly Evolved. "Fuck the World" (later abbreviated to "F.T.W.") was the first song released from Winning Days and was released on 15 December 2003, three months prior to the album's release. The song is sarcastic in nature despite what its title seems to imply; as stated in a 2005 NME article, "Winning Days is anything but". During interviews given by lead singer Craig Nicholls in 2004, he stated "I definitely think the world is a good place, but maybe it would be better if people didn't hate so much and kill animals. At the same time, it's like, whatever. It's just a planet, that's all."

The next single "Ride" was released on 23 February 2004. "Ride" reached number 94 on Triple J's Hottest 100 of 2004.

The title track was released as the third and final single on 24 May 2004.

== Critical reception ==
Winning Days was met with "mixed or average" reviews from critics. At Metacritic, which assigns a weighted average rating out of 100 to reviews from mainstream publications, this release received an average score of 50 based on 23 reviews.

== Track listing ==
All tracks are written by Craig Nicholls, except "She's Got Something to Say to Me" co-written by Patrick Matthews.

| No. | Title | Length |
|---|---|---|
| 1. | "Ride" | 2:36 |
| 2. | "Animal Machine" | 3:28 |
| 3. | "TV Pro" | 3:45 |
| 4. | "Autumn Shade II" | 3:14 |
| 5. | "Evil Town" | 3:06 |
| 6. | "Winning Days" | 3:33 |
| 7. | "She's Got Something to Say to Me" | 2:32 |
| 8. | "Rainfall" | 3:21 |
| 9. | "Amnesia" | 4:39 |
| 10. | "Sun Child" | 4:33 |
| 11. | "F.T.W." | 3:41 |

Japanese bonus edition
| No. | Title | Length |
|---|---|---|
| 12. | "Drown the Baptists" |

== Personnel ==
Personnel taken from Winning Days CD booklet.

The Vines

- Craig Nicholls – vocals, guitars, percussion, Moog
- Patrick Matthews – bass guitar, piano and keyboards
- Ryan Griffiths – guitars
- Hamish Rosser – drums, percussion

Production

- Rob Schnapf – producer, mixing
- Doug Boehm – engineering, mixing
- Bill Synans – recording assistance
- Steven Rhodes – mixing assistance
- Ted Jensen – mastering
- Susanna Howe – photography
- Love Police – album sleeve

== Charts ==
| Chart (2004) | Peak position |
|---|---|
| Australian Albums (ARIA) | 7 |
| Austrian Albums (Ö3 Austria) | 40 |
| Belgian Albums (Ultratop Wallonia) | 63 |
| French Albums (SNEP) | 51 |
| German Albums (Offizielle Top 100) | 47 |
| Swiss Albums (Schweizer Hitparade) | 77 |
| UK Albums (OCC) | 29 |
| US Billboard 200 | 23 |
