= Highly Evolved =

Studio album by the Vines
- Released: 14 July 2002
- Recorded: July 2001–February 2002
- Studio: The Sound Factory, Hollywood, California
- Genre: Alternative rock; garage punk; post-punk revival; post-grunge; neo-psychedelia
- Length: 43:35
- Label: Capitol; Heavenly Recordings; Wicked Nature Music
- Producer: Rob Schnapf

The Vines chronology
College EP (2002)	Highly Evolved (2002)	Winning Days (2004)

Singles from Highly Evolved
- 1. "Highly Evolved" Released: 22 April 2002; 2. "Get Free" Released: 17 June 2002; 3. "Outtathaway!" Released: 18 November 2002; 4. "Homesick" Released: 12 May 2003

Alternate cover
- First American pressing

Professional ratings
Aggregate scores
Source	Rating
Metacritic	68/100
Review scores
Source	Rating
AllMusic	4/5 stars
Blender	4/5 stars
Entertainment Weekly	C
The Guardian	4/5 stars
Los Angeles Times	3/4 stars
NME	9/10
Pitchfork	4.1/10
Q	4/5 stars
Rolling Stone	3/5 stars
Uncut	4/5 stars

Highly Evolved is the debut studio album by Australian alternative rock band the Vines, released in July 2002 on Capitol Records and produced by Rob Schnapf. The album was a significant success, riding the wave of the garage rock revival trend and earning critical acclaim, including being named the 2nd best album of 2002 by NME and being included in "1001 Albums You Must Hear Before You Die" and "100 Best Australian Albums."

== Release ==
Highly Evolved was released on 14 July 2002 on Capitol Records. Produced by Rob Schnapf, known for his collaboration with Tom Rothrock on Elliott Smith's albums Either/Or, XO, and Figure 8, Highly Evolved was an immensely popular debut, part of a trend towards garage rock revival bands known as much for the relentless hype from the UK music press as for their music; the Vines were frequently compared to Nirvana. The debut single, "Highly Evolved", was chosen as Single of the Week by influential British music magazine NME. The magazine also voted it the 2nd best album of the year in 2002. The album was also included in the book 1001 Albums You Must Hear Before You Die. In October 2010, it was listed in the book 100 Best Australian Albums.

== Recording and mastering ==
Highly Evolved was recorded and mixed at The Sound Factory and Sunset Sound Recorders in Hollywood, California. It was recorded between July 2001 and February 2002.

== Track listing ==
All tracks are written by Craig Nicholls, except "1969" co-written by Dave Olliffe.

No.	Title	Length
1.	"Highly Evolved"	1:35
2.	"Autumn Shade"	2:17
3.	"Outtathaway"	3:02
4.	"Sunshinin"	2:43
5.	"Homesick"	4:53
6.	"Get Free"	1:59
7.	"Country Yard"	3:46
8.	"Factory"	3:12
9.	"In the Jungle"	4:15
10.	"Mary Jane"	5:52
11.	"Ain't No Room"	3:28
12.	"1969"	6:27

== Personnel ==
Personnel taken from Highly Evolved CD booklet.

The Vines

- Craig Nicholls – vocals, guitar, percussion, piano on "Homesick", cover painting
- Patrick Matthews – bass, piano on "Autumn Shade", "Mary Jane", and "Factory", organ on "Autumn Shade" and "In the Jungle"
- Dave Olliffe – drums on "Highly Evolved", "Autumn Shade", "Outtathaway", "Sunshinin'", "Homesick" (outro only), "Country Yard", "Mary Jane" and "1969"

Additional musicians

- Pete Thomas – drums on "Factory", "Ain't No Room" and "Homesick" (except outro)
- Joey Waronker – drums on "Get Free"
- Victor Indrizzo – drums on "In the Jungle"
- Roger Joseph Manning Jr. – keyboards on "Highly Evolved", "Outtathaway", "Sunshinin'" and "Autumn Shade"
- Rob Schnapf – additional guitars on "County Yard", "Homesick", "Ain't No Room" and "Factory"
- Ethan Johns – additional percussion on "Get Free", "Autumn Shade", "Factory" and "Sunshinin'"
- Steven Rhodes – additional percussion on "Get Free", "Autumn Shade", "Factory" and "Sunshinin'"

Production

- Rob Schnapf – production and mixing
- Doug Boehm – engineering
- Steven Rhodes – additional engineering
- Andy Wallace – mixing on "Get Free"
- Justin Stanley – production on "In the Jungle"
- Tony Rambo – engineering on "In the Jungle"
- Ted Jensen – mastering
- Kevin Dean – production assistant
- Craig Conard – production assistant

== Charts ==
=== Weekly charts ===
Weekly chart performance for Highly Evolved
Chart (2002)	Peak position
Australian Albums (ARIA)	5
Austrian Albums (Ö3 Austria)	28
Canadian Albums (Nielsen SoundScan)	56
French Albums (SNEP)	56
German Albums (Offizielle Top 100)	33
Irish Albums (IRMA)	13
New Zealand Albums (RMNZ)	48
Norwegian Albums (VG-lista)	22
Scottish Albums (OCC)	3
UK Albums (OCC)	3
US Billboard 200	11

=== Year-end charts ===
Year-end chart performance for Highly Evolved
Chart (2002)	Position
Australian Albums (ARIA)	51
Canadian Albums (Nielsen SoundScan)	151
Canadian Alternative Albums (Nielsen SoundScan)	49
UK Albums (OCC)	171
US Billboard 200	156

== Certifications ==
Certifications for Highly Evolved
Region	Certification	Certified units/sales
Australia (ARIA)	Platinum	70,000^{^}
Canada (Music Canada)	Gold	50,000^{^}
United Kingdom (BPI)	Gold	150,000
United States (RIAA)	Gold	500,000^{^}
^{^} Shipments figures based on certification alone.
