= The Vines (band) =

Australian rock band

- The Vines performing at Valley Fiesta in Brisbane, Australia 2016; Left to right: Craig Nicholls, Lachlan West, Tim John

Background information
- Also known as: Rishikesh; Joe Dirt; Foregone Conclusion; the Crimes
- Origin: Sydney, Australia
- Genres: Alternative rock; garage rock; post-grunge; post-punk revival; neo-psychedelia
- Years active: 1994–present
- Labels: Wicked Nature; Capitol; Heavenly; Ivy League; BMG; Cooking Vinyl; Sony
- Members: Craig Nicholls; Ryan Griffiths; Hamish Rosser
- Past members: Patrick Matthews; David Olliffe; Brad Heald; Lachlan West; Tim John
- Website: www.thevinesband.com

The Vines are an Australian rock band formed in Sydney in 1994. Their sound has been described as a musical hybrid of 1960s garage rock and 1990s alternative rock. The band has been through several line-up changes, with vocalist/guitarist Craig Nicholls serving as the sole constant throughout the band's history.

The Vines' success in the Australian recording industry resulted in winning the ARIA Award for Breakthrough Artist – Single for "Get Free" and receiving five other nominations for their debut album Highly Evolved, plus two further nominations in subsequent years. In 2003, the album went platinum in Australia, and since then the band has released four albums and a best-of compilation from their time at Capitol Records. The Vines have released seven studio albums.

== History ==
=== Formation and early years (1994–2001) ===
In 1991, Craig Nicholls met Patrick Matthews while working at their local McDonald's in the suburb of South Hurstville, New South Wales. Bonded over a shared love of rock music, they began playing together at Matthews' home, with Nicholls on guitar and vocals and Matthews on bass. They were later joined by Matthews' school friend David Olliffe on drums.

==== Band name ====
Originally called "Rishikesh", a name suggested by Olliffe, which refers to the Indian city where the Beatles visited an ashram in 1968, they played a couple of small gigs in pubs. The local newspapers regularly misprinted the name as "Rishi Chasms", so Nicholls suggested a new name, "the Vines", as an homage to his father, who fronted a local band called the Vynes.

==== Early demo recordings and live shows ====
In October 1994, Patrick, Craig and David played their first gig as The Vines at an 18th birthday party at South Hurstville RSL Memorial Bowling Club. They covered songs by Nirvana, You Am I, and others. Back in the shed, meanwhile, the three had started developing their own sound on a four-track recorder, with Nicholls soon emerging as the band's primary songwriter.

By late 1998, The Vines only played a handful of gigs over the course of six years. One of them was at The Iron Duke pub in Sydney. Supporting local band Starky, it was the first time they were called back onstage for an encore.

In April 1999, The Vines entered a studio for the first time to record their debut demos with high-school friend Glenn Santry as the engineer. In two quick sessions at A# Studios in Riverwood, they recorded six tracks, including early versions of "In the Jungle" and "Winning Days".

==== Increased exposure and early releases ====
In 2000, the "In the Jungle" demo was played on FBi Radio Sydney, catching the ear of Ivy League Records' Andy Cassell. Ivy League's management company Winterman and Goldstein soon signed The Vines and encouraged them to record further demos and play more shows.

In early 2001, The Vines embarked on their first national tour of Australia as supporting act for You Am I and Eskimo Joe. During their gigs, the band gave away 5-track demo CDs featuring early recordings of songs like "Highly Evolved" and "Mary Jane". In the same year, their Australia debut single "Hot Leather/Sunchild" was released through independent label Illustrious Artists, run by Russell Hopkinson from You Am I.

Meanwhile, Rex Records put out what was to be their UK debut single, "Factory", as a limited seven-inch single. The release became NME's Single of the Week in November 2001.

=== Highly Evolved (2001–2003) ===
By the beginning of 2001, The Vines had compiled a collection of songs. Winterman and Goldstein approached the Australian artist development company Engineroom with a 19-song demo tape. Impressed by their potential, Engineroom signed the band, funded the recording of more demos and negotiated deals with British and American labels, bypassing Australia.

American producer Rob Schnapf became impressed with The Vines after receiving a demo CD, leading him to express interest in collaborating with the band by sending an email filled with the phrase "The Vines!". In July 2001, the band flew to Los Angeles, to begin recording their debut album, Highly Evolved, with Schnapf at Sunset Sound Studios. Running into money issues, the originally planned eight-week recording session extended to six months. Faced with pressure from the label, David Olliffe returned to Australia halfway through the recording, leading to the recruitment of session players such as Joey Waronker and Pete Thomas.

The band signed to Heavenly Records in the UK in December 2001 and EMI in Australia in April 2002. While mixing the record Highly Evolved, The Vines signed with Capitol Records.

In early 2002, The Vines embarked on a pre-release tour in the United Kingdom to promote their highly anticipated album, Highly Evolved. As they took to the stage, the band introduced a new drummer, Hamish Rosser, who replaced David Olliffe. Additionally, The Vines welcomed Ryan Griffiths, a longtime friend and schoolmate of Nicholls, as a second guitarist.

The first single off the album, "Highly Evolved", earned them more critical acclaim as NME made it a Single of the Week in March 2002. The single charted in the UK at number 32 on the singles chart and on Australia's ARIAnet top 100 singles chart.

Highly Evolved was released on July 14, 2002. It reached number 11 in the U.S. Billboard Hot 100 albums chart and sold 1.5 million copies throughout the world with distribution through Capitol Records. By end of 2003, the album went platinum in Australia.

In August, 2002, The band played high-profile slots on the Late Show with David Letterman and the MTV Video Music Awards. They won the ARIA Award for Breakthrough Artist – Single for "Get Free" in 2002, and were nominated for five other awards.

The Vines gained significant recognition in 2002, appearing on the cover of Rolling Stone in September 2002 with the words "Rock is Back: Meet the Vines" boldly emblazoned underneath. Referred to as the 'The' bands, the Strokes, the Hives, the White Stripes, and the Vines combined "old fashioned punk and adrenaline fuelled riffs" to be ushered in at the beginning of 2002 as the "saviors of rock".

In 2002, The Vines appeared three times on the cover of NME in June, July, and October, hailed as the future of rock & roll. Their US debut single "Get Free" was listed as number 38 on NME's "The 100 Greatest Singles of All Time."

"Get Free"
"Get Free" from the Vines' debut album Highly Evolved.

=== Winning Days (2004–2005) ===
In May 2003, the band went into a studio in Woodstock, New York, with Rob Schnapf again on production. While Craig Nicholls had talked of having a highly produced album, he told the Australian edition of Rolling Stone in March 2004 that they decided to stick to a less-is-more philosophy. "I wanted it to be – in my head – something grand, with big ideas and that vision sort of thing. But at the same time, that doesn't mean that something can't be special if it's just simple. Because I think that the songs are the main thing".

The Vines, Camden Electric Ballroom, 19 February 2004

Their second album, Winning Days, was released on 29 March 2004 and rose to number 23 in the US. "Ride" and "Winning Days" were released as singles in Australia (where they did not chart) and the UK.

=== Vision Valley (2006–2007) ===
In mid-2005, the group announced they were working on their third album, with producer Wayne Connolly. Andy Kent of fellow Australian band You Am I filled in on bass playing duties. In November of that year, the band's management announced they had finished recording all the songs that would appear on the album.

"Don't Listen to the Radio" was released as the album's first single, and was made available for digital download on 7 March on iTunes. The song was used on the soundtrack for the video game FlatOut 2. "Gross Out" was made available for digital download on 18 March, and was the first song leaked from the album. Vision Valley was released on 1 April 2006 in Australia, 3 April in Europe, and 4 April in the United States.

Vision Valley consisted of short, immediate songs; the album running little over 30 minutes in length. "Anysound" was the second official single from the album, and an animated music video was released exclusively through YouTube. The song was included as a track heard on the in-game radio in the 2007 LucasArts published Thrillville: Off The Rails. "Dope Train" was released as a third single, with a music video composed of live footage of the band from Big Day Out in 2007.

On 19 July 2006, the Vines played a gig at the Annandale Hotel under the name "Joe Dirt", with a new bassist, Brad Heald, after Patrick Matthews departed the group. Matthews had left in response to an outburst Nicholls had while the group played a promotional show for Triple M radio.

=== Melodia (2007–2008) ===
In 2007, the Vines signed to Ivy League Records for an Australian album deal. The first single preceding the album Melodia was "He's a Rocker", which was released through iTunes on 3 June 2008 along with two bonus tracks. "MerryGoRound" was released as a follow-up single for radio airplay in Australia during August 2008. "MerryGoRound" only received support and backing from Triple J radio. "Get Out" was released as the third single from Melodia in September 2008 for radio airplay, and a music video was released to coincide with the release of "Get Out" as a single by Ivy League Records on YouTube. "Get Out" was featured on the in-game soundtrack of Midnight Club: Los Angeles released in late October 2008 on Xbox 360 and PlayStation 3 gaming platforms.

In October 2008, the Vines commenced a national Australian tour in support of Melodia, playing small venues throughout Australia. In November 2008, the Vines were announced as being part of the line-up for the 2009 Australian Big Day Out, but the band cancelled.

=== Future Primitive (2009–2012) ===
On 14 November 2009, the Vines played at the Annandale Hotel, under the alias of the Crimes. They had a support slot with You Am I, playing their back catalogue and a new song from an album due in 2011.

A music video for "Gimme Love" wrapped filming on 1 March 2011, with the completed video surfacing online through YouTube on 27 March. The music video pays homage to the 2010 film Scott Pilgrim vs. the World.

Over a year after its completion, Future Primitive received an official release date through The Daily Telegraph on 3 June 2011. Because the Vines did not have a label at the time of recording, the band members funded the album's recording themselves. Upon the album's completion, the band approached various record labels to see if any were interested in signing the band for its release, explaining the year-long delay between recording and release.

On 26 November 2011, rumours on the band's Facebook page suggested that the band had "pushed out" two of its members. At the 2011 Homebake music festival, the Vines emerged on the main-stage as a three piece, consisting of Nicholls, Heald and drummer Murray Sheridan. The departure of both Griffiths and Rosser was confirmed by Channel V presenter Jane Gazzo, who wrote that the two had been "sacked" in a Twitter post.

Craig's sister, Jess Nicholls, also confirmed their departure via the band's official forum. "If any of you were at Homebake yesterday, I'm sure you can agree the set was amazing and sounded better than ever," she wrote. "The band has made a creative decision to revert back to a three piece, as they originally started. I know you will probably have a lot of questions but just wanted to say don't fear, this is in no way the end of the Vines!!" Nicholls, Heald and Sheridan performed again at Southbound music festival in Perth on 8 January 2012.

On 16 March 2012, Rosser announced that he had joined Australian rock band Wolfmother, as their new drummer, on the Faster Louder website. He also claimed that the band had "broken up", although "Craig [Nicholls] will always write great music in the future and he may choose to carry on under the Vines' name."

=== Wicked Nature (2012–2015) ===
Heald confirmed his departure from the band in 2012. A new line-up, consisting of Nicholls, drummer Lachlan West and bassist Tim John, entered the studio to record their sixth album on 20 August 2012 in Sydney's 301 Studio and completed the mixing of the album at the end of 2012.

West revealed in a June 2013 interview with his other band, Something With Numbers, that two producers have worked on the forthcoming Vines release. Paul McKercher produced the first half of the record and Lachlan Mitchell, who also produced the latest Something With Numbers record, worked on the second half based upon West's recommendation to Nicholls. The article also stated that the new Vines album was "due for release in the latter half of this year (2013)". According to a June 2014 Faster Louder article, in addition to the anticipated sixth album, a seventh album was recorded with the new line-up.

At the beginning of July 2014, the Vines created a PledgeMusic page for their sixth record Wicked Nature, a double album which was released on 2 September 2014. The lead single "Metal Zone" was released on 14 July. Its music video premiered on Noisy on 11 July.

Craig Nicholls announced the side project White Shadows, focused on electronic music. The project released the lead single "Give Up Give Out Give In" on 9 April 2015, with a music video produced. The debut White Shadows album Secret of Life was released later in 2015, featuring over 70 different guest musicians.

=== In Miracle Land and classic line-up reunion (2016–2018) ===
On 1 April 2016, The Vines released the single "In Miracle Land". On 14 April 2016, Craig Nicholls performed a solo show at Sydney's Newtown Social Club. The band supported the upcoming album with a brief "In Miracle Land" tour, playing three dates in October 2016.

In 2017, The Vines re-issued their debut album, Highly Evolved, in celebration of its 15th anniversary.

On 28 April 2018, Nicholls performed with The Killers in Sydney, joining them for "When We Were Young" and "Get Free." In May 2018, the original line-up from 2002 to 2004 reunited for two shows at the Enmore and Metro Theatre. This marked Patrick Matthews' first performance with The Vines in 14 years and the first for Ryan Griffiths and Hamish Rosser in seven years.

The album In Miracle Land was released on 29 June 2018, featuring the same line-up as their previous album Wicked Nature, with Tim John on bass and Lachlan West on drums.

=== Eighth studio album (2018–present) ===
On 30 March 2024, in a YouTube interview, Hamish Rosser confirmed his return to The Vines, mentioning that new music is in progress and awaiting finalization and release. Rosser mentioned Autumn Shade V as one of the new songs.

== Musical style ==
Unlike many other pop post-modernists, the Vines never sound weighed down by all the influences they include in their music—it's as if they're so excited by everything they hear, they can't help but recombine it in unique ways.

— Heather Phares, AllMusic

Ex-bassist Matthews believed that Winning Days was a step in a different direction for the band. "The themes are more introspective and less wild rock'n'roll". Their music also was described by Chart Attack as having "neo-psychedelic arrangements".

== Reception ==
Upon the release of their debut album, the Vines were hailed as "the second coming of Nirvana" by the British press; their grungy sound was considered reminiscent of the Seattle scene c. 1991 and Nicholls' erratic on-stage behaviour and raw vocals drew comparisons between him and Kurt Cobain. Highly Evolved became a huge success and their accompanying live shows in the early years were praised as "electrifying" and "sensational".

Critical reactions to 2004's Winning Days were mixed. Pitchfork's Chris Ott described it as being "nothing more than boring and harmlessly vapid" and showing "only mild promise". Conversely, Rolling Stone' David Fricke said it was "a leap forward in style and frenzy".

In June 2021, Double J's Al Newstead wrote an op-ed in support of the band. "Their legacy isn't clean cut," he wrote, "but it's still remarkable to see what The Vines achieved, and chiefly what Nicholls survived."

== Legacy ==
The Vines gained notoriety in the early 2000s as one of the leading bands of the garage rock revival scene. Their debut album Highly Evolved was named number two album of the year by NME and listed in Rolling Stone Australia's 200 Greatest Australian Albums of All Time.

In 2002, The Vines became the first Australian musical act to be featured on the cover of US Rolling Stone magazine since Men at Work in 1983; this helped revive international interest in the Australian music scene, which numerous artists have continued to benefit from in subsequent years.

The Vines are considered an influential group in the development of 2000s indie rock, with a number of bands and musicians citing them as an inspiration or influence. Alex Turner, frontman of Arctic Monkeys, credits The Vines as a major influence in Arctic Monkeys' early years, stating: "One of the reasons we formed the band was because of the Vines". Turner also named Craig Nicholls' live performances as a powerful early inspiration and described The Vines as "collectively our favorite band at the time." Kevin Parker of Tame Impala and his bandmates remarked that they were "super massive fans" and idolised The Vines and Craig Nicholls when they were younger. Wolf Alice cited The Vines as an early inspiration and named The Vines' second album Winning Days as one of the group's most vital influences. While performing on stage in 2018, The Killers directly attributed The Vines with "blowing open" the doors for other indie bands like themselves to achieve mainstream success. Other artists who have cited The Vines as an influence include Violent Soho, British India and VANT.

== Band members ==
Current members

- Craig Nicholls – lead vocals, guitar (1994–present)
- Ryan Griffiths – guitar, backing vocals (2002–2011, 2018, 2023–present)
- Hamish Rosser – drums (2002–2011, 2018, 2023–present)

Former members

- David Olliffe – drums (1994–2002)
- Patrick Matthews – bass guitar, backing vocals (1994–2004, 2018)
- Brad Heald – bass guitar, backing vocals (2006–2012)
- Lachlan West – drums, backing vocals (2012–2018)
- Tim John – bass guitar, backing vocals (2012–2018)

Former session/touring musicians

- Andy Kent – bass guitar (2006)
- Murray Sheridan – drums (2011–2012)

== Discography ==
- Highly Evolved (2002)
- Winning Days (2004)
- Vision Valley (2006)
- Melodia (2008)
- Future Primitive (2011)
- Wicked Nature (2014)
- In Miracle Land (2018)

== Awards and nominations ==
=== ARIA Music Awards ===
The ARIA Music Awards is an annual awards ceremony that recognises excellence, innovation, and achievement across all genres of Australian music. They commenced in 1987.

Year	Nominee / work	Award	Result	Ref.
2002	"Get Free"	Breakthrough Artist - Single	Won	
2002	"Get Free"	Single of the Year	Nominated	
2002	Highly Evolved	Breakthrough Artist - Album	Nominated	
2002	Highly Evolved	Best Rock Album	Nominated	
2002	Highly Evolved	Best Group	Nominated	
2002	Craig Nicholls for The Vines' Highly Evolved	Best Cover Art	Nominated	
2004	James Bellesini and Love Police – The Vines Winning Days	Best Cover Art	Nominated	

=== NME Awards ===
Year	Nominee / work	Award	Result	Ref.
2003	"Get Free"	Best Single	Won	
2003	Highly Evolved	Best Album	Nominated	
2003	The Vines	Best International Band	Nominated	
2003	The Vines	Best New Band	Nominated	
2003	The Vines	Best Live Band	Nominated	
