= Youth Group =

Australian indie rock band

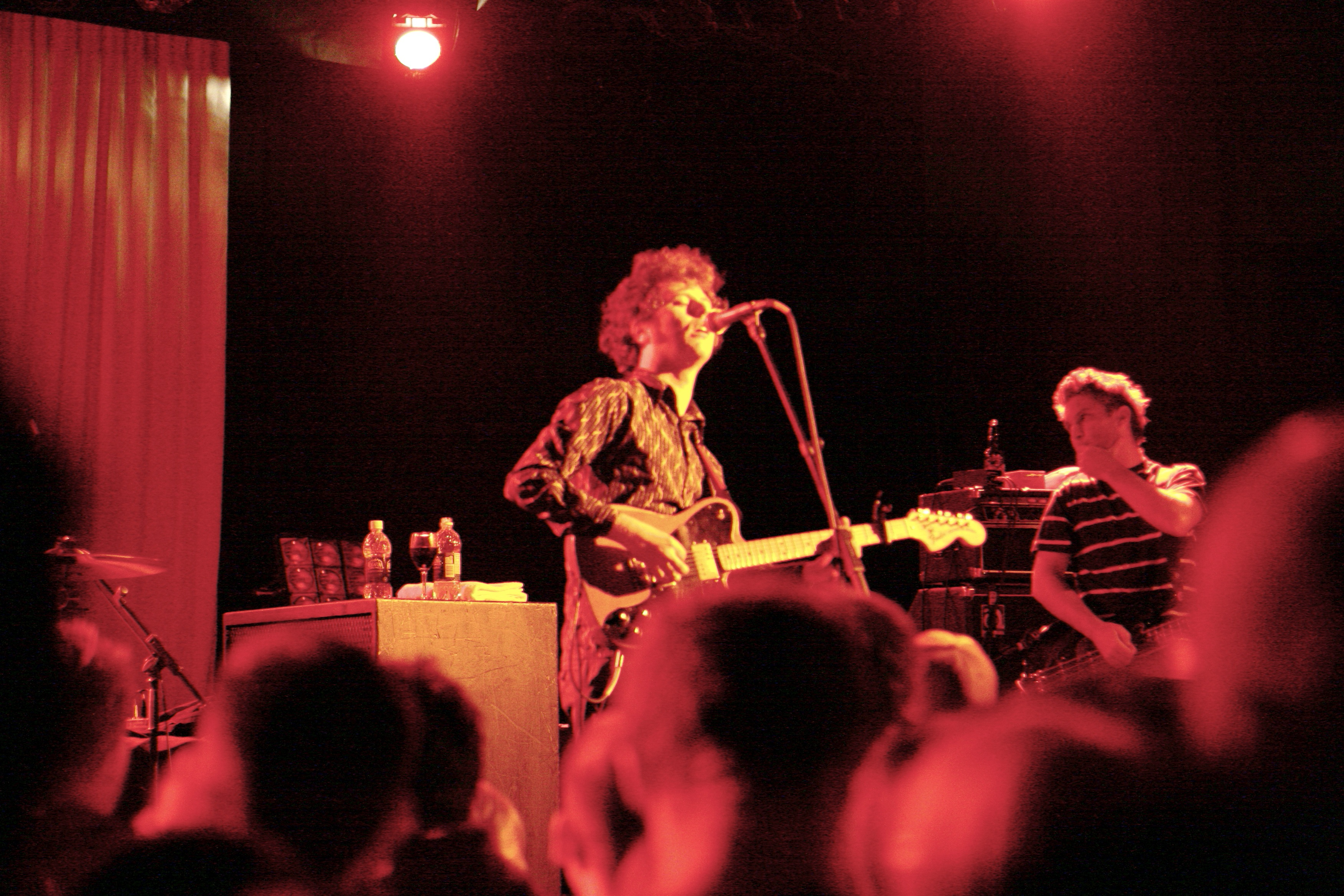
- Youth Group performing in 2005

Background information
- Origin: Sydney, New South Wales, Australia
- Genres: Indie rock; alternative rock
- Years active: 1996–2009; 2014–present
- Labels: Ivy League; Epitaph; ANTI-; World's Fair
- Members: Toby Martin; Danny Lee Allen; Cameron Emerson-Elliott; Patrick Matthews
- Past members: Andy Cassell; Paul Murphy
- Website: youthgroup.com.au

Youth Group is an Australian indie rock band based in Newtown, New South Wales. Built around the vocals of singer Toby Martin and production of Wayne Connolly, the sound of Youth Group is reminiscent of indie rock artists such as Teenage Fanclub, Pavement and Death Cab for Cutie.

The band formed in Sydney in the late 1990s and has released four albums, three of which have gained worldwide release. They achieved major success in 2006 when their cover of Alphaville's "Forever Young", which had been recorded for the soundtrack of the US TV drama The O.C., was released as a single and reached No. 1 in Australia, attaining platinum status. As of 2015, the band is signed to Ivy League Records.

== History ==
The band's founding members were Toby Martin on rhythm guitar and vocals, Danny Lee Allen on drums, Andy Cassell on bass guitar, and Paul Murphy on lead guitar. The band's first show was in November 1997 at the Warren View Hotel in the inner Sydney suburb of Enmore. At this stage, Allen had played drums for approximately two months. Current lead guitarist, Cameron Emerson-Elliott, and bassist, Patrick Matthews, joined in 2004. Martin, the main songwriter, is the grandson of Hungarian-born Australian poet David Martin. Founding bass player Cassell retired from bass duties in 2003 to concentrate on being one of three partners in the Ivy League Records label and the Winterman & Goldstein band management agency (Youth Group's Australian record label and management, respectively). Cassell is a relative of Australian Test cricketer Geoff Dymock. Founding guitarist Paul Murphy left the band in 2003 due to creative differences. Cameron Emerson-Elliott played guitar with Sydney punk band John Reed Club in the late 1990s and has known Martin since their school days in Canberra, Australia, at Narrabundah College; at the college, the pair wrote songs together as the Morris Brothers. Patrick Matthews played bass in the Vines before joining Youth Group. Johnno Lattin (also of La Huva) played bass in the band during the Skeleton Jar period around 2003.

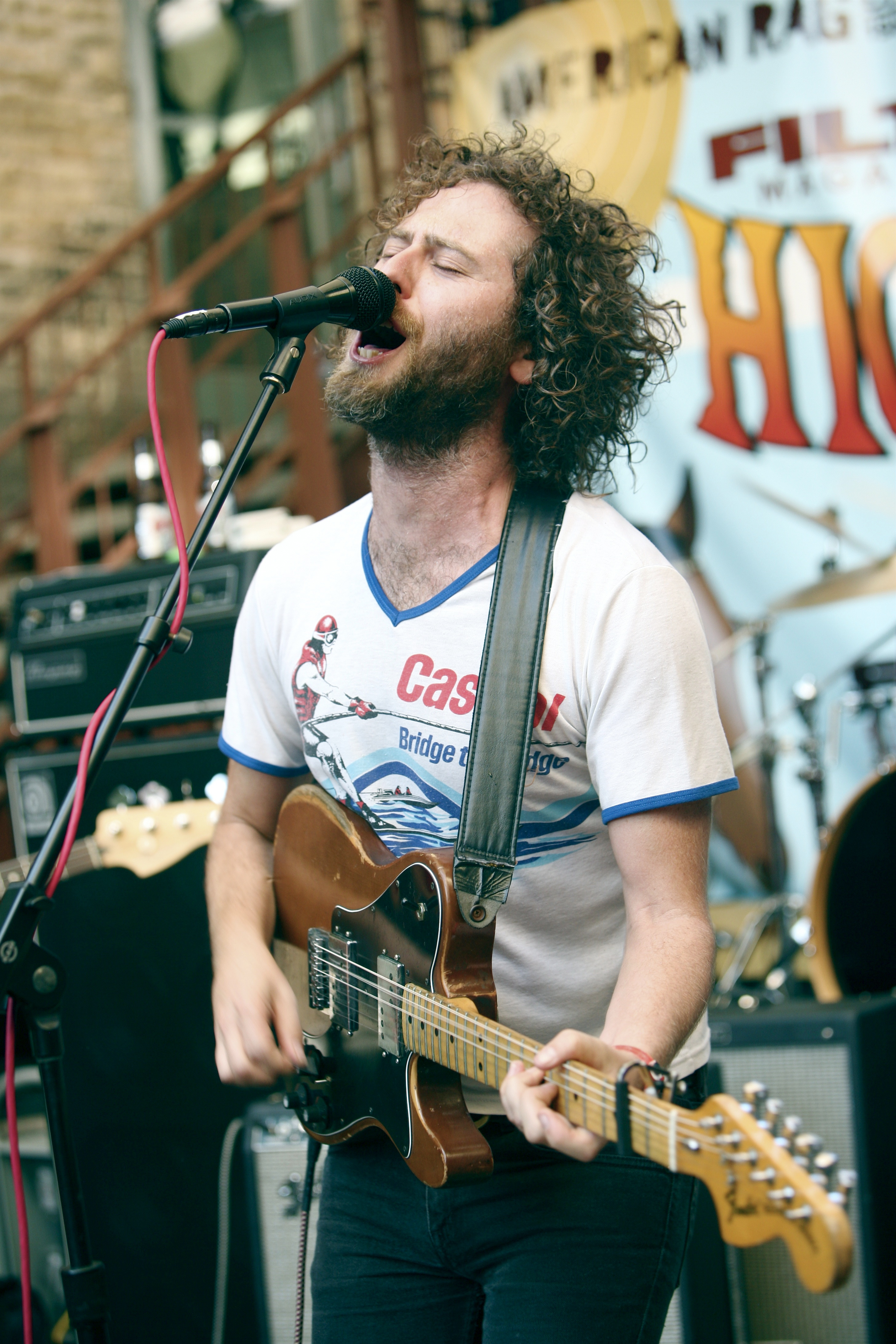
Frontman Toby Martin

The band met success when a series of chance happenings led Epitaph Records boss Brett Gurewitz to hear their second album, Skeleton Jar, in 2004 and release it in the US in 2005. Despite sounding nothing like the California punk that Epitaph is known for, the support of a US label was the crucial break that Youth Group needed to find a wider audience. In 2003 the band played at the South by Southwest festival in Austin, Texas, and performed on four dates with the Vines and the Music on a US West Coast tour. But it was a chance to support Death Cab for Cutie in 2005 on a coast to coast US tour that saw their profile rise most quickly internationally.

Their single "Forever Young", a cover of the 1984 song by Alphaville, was used in the television show The O.C. and heavily featured in promos for Australian TV station Channel Ten at the beginning of 2006. The song debuted on the Australian charts at No. 2 in March 2006, and eventually peaked at No. 1. It was also No. 1 in the first ever digital download chart. During 2006, they supported Coldplay in their sold-out tour of Australia; in 2008 they supported Kings of Leon and Interpol on their tours of Australia.

Youth Group won the ARIA Award for Breakthrough Artist - Single for "Forever Young".

Youth Group performing in 2007

Youth Group toured the US twice in 2009 before moving into an extended break. Though the band remained on good terms, they began focusing on other projects. Martin released a solo album, Love's Shadow, in July 2012 on Ivy League Records, while Danny relocated to New York, toured with We Are Scientists and with Brooklyn band the Drums until 2017. Matthews played in several bands – including David McCormack and the Polaroids as well as Betty Airs and The Jewel & The Falcon – before joining Community Radio alongside fellow Youth Group bandmate Emerson-Elliot. In 2011, Skeleton Jar made No. 98 on Australian radio station Triple J's Hottest 100 Australian Albums of All Time (Industry List).

In November 2014, the band announced a show at the Newtown Social Club in Sydney for January 2015, in which they played Skeleton Jar in its entirety. The show sold out within a week of going on sale. The band later announced additional headlining shows in Sydney, Melbourne and Brisbane for June and July 2015; as well as a vinyl release of Skeleton Jar. The band returned again in late 2016, with their album Australian Halloween being released in October 2019.

In August 2025, the group announced the forthcoming release of their sixth studio album Big Whoop.

== Discography ==
=== Studio albums ===
List of studio albums, with selected chart positions and certifications
Title	Album details	Peak chart positions		
Title	Album details	AUS	NZ	US Heat
Urban & Eastern	Released: 14 May 2000; Label: Ivy League (IVLCD019); Format: CD, digital download	—	—	—
Skeleton Jar	Released: 22 March 2004; Label: Ivy League (IVLCD025); Format: CD, digital download	— (Note: Skeleton Jar did not enter the Australian ARIA Singles Chart but peaked at number 12 on the ARIA Hitseekers Chart.)	—	—
Casino Twilight Dogs	Released: 15 July 2006; Label: Ivy League (IVY042); Format: CD, digital download	10	32	48
The Night Is Ours	Released: 30 June 2008; Label: Ivy League (IVY064); Format: CD, digital download	66	—	—
Australian Halloween	Released: 11 October 2019; Label: Ivy League; Format: CD, digital download	—	—	—
Big Whoop	Released: 31 October 2025; Label: Impressed Recordings; Format: CD, digital download	—	—	—

=== Singles ===
List of singles, with selected chart positions
Title	Year	Peak chart positions						Certifications	Album
Title	Year	AUS	ITA	NZ	SPA	US Bub.	US Pop	Certifications	Album
"Weekender"	1998	—	—	—	—	—	—		Non-album singles
"Country Tour"	1999	—	—	—	—	—	—		Non-album singles
"We Are Mean"	1999	—	—	—	—	—	—		Non-album singles
"Interface"	1999	—	—	—	—	—	—		Non-album singles
"Happiness' Border"	2000	—	—	—	—	—	—		Urban & Eastern
"Guilty"	2001	—	—	—	—	—	—		Urban & Eastern
"Shadowland"	2003	—	—	—	—	—	—		Skeleton Jar
"Baby Body"	2004	—	—	—	—	—	—		Skeleton Jar
"Forever Young"	2006	1	37	7	44	10	76	ARIA: 5× Platinum	Casino Twilight Dogs
"Catching & Killing"	2006	44	—	—	—	—	—		Casino Twilight Dogs
"Daisychains"	2007	—	—	—	—	—	—		Casino Twilight Dogs
"Sorry"	2007	—	—	—	—	—	—		Casino Twilight Dogs
"Two Sides"	2008	—	—	—	—	—	—		The Night Is Ours
"All This Will Pass"	2008	—	—	—	—	—	—		The Night Is Ours
"In My Dreams"	2008	—	—	—	—	—	—		The Night Is Ours
"Cusp"	2019	—	—	—	—	—	—		Australian Halloween
"Siberia"	2024	—	—	—	—	—	—		Big Whoop
"The Joke"	2025	—	—	—	—	—	—		Big Whoop
"Saturday Dad"	2025	—	—	—	—	—	—		Big Whoop
"Forever Young" (2026 flashback remix) (with Paul Mac)	2026	—	—	—	—	—	—		Forever Young (War Child album)
"—" denotes items which were not released in that country or failed to chart.

== Awards and nominations ==
=== ARIA Music Awards ===
The ARIA Music Awards is an annual awards ceremony that recognises excellence, innovation, and achievement across all genres of Australian music. They commenced in 1987.

Year	Nominee / work	Award	Result	Ref.
2006	"Forever Young"	Breakthrough Artist - Single	Won	
2006	"Forever Young"	Single of the Year	Nominated	
2006	"Forever Young"	Highest Selling Single	Nominated	
2006	Andy Cassell – Youth Group – "Forever Young"	Best Video	Nominated	
2006	Wayne Connolly – Youth Group – Casino Twilight Dogs	Producer of the Year	Nominated	
