= Rob Schnapf =

American record producer

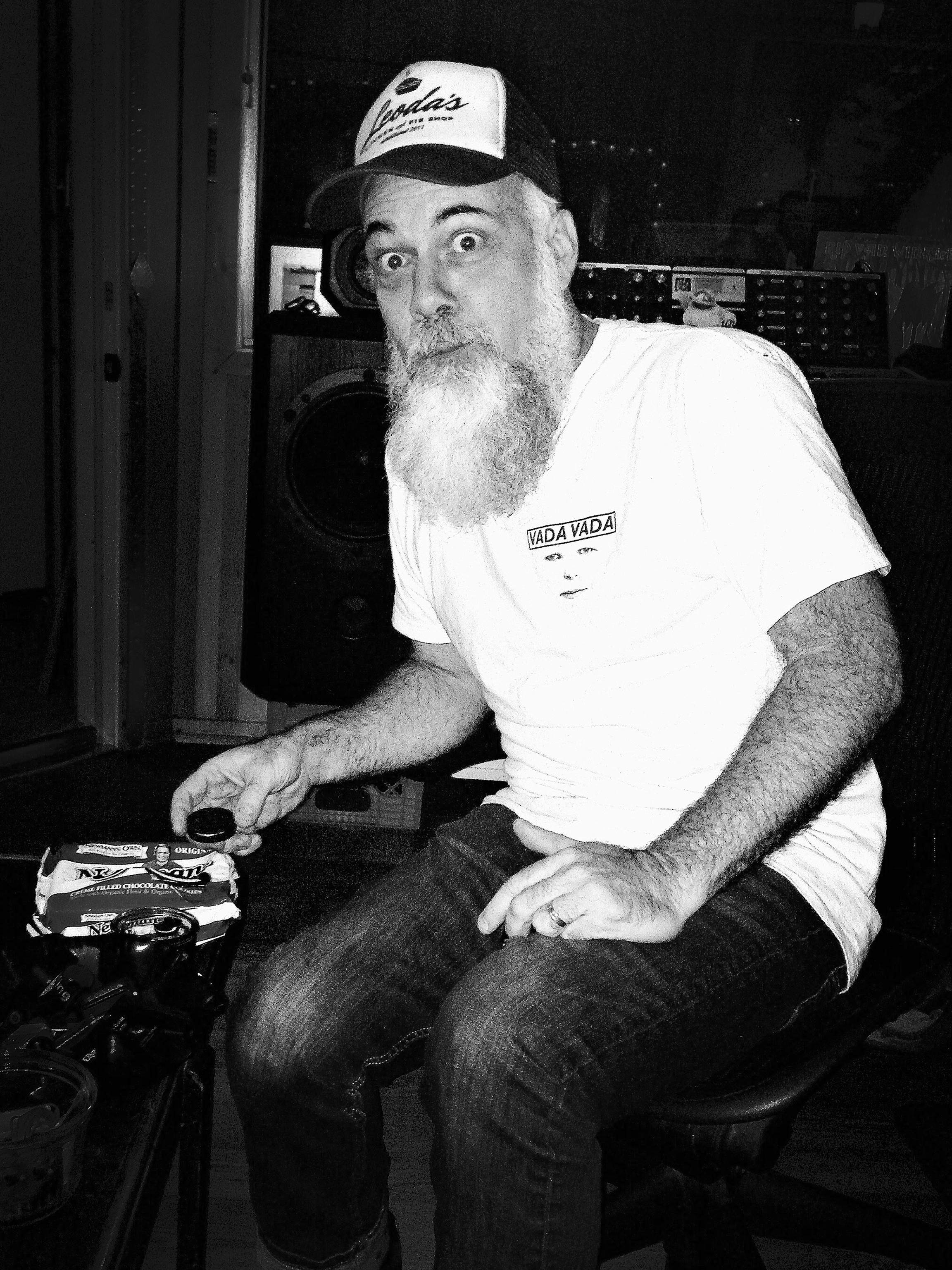
- Schnapf in 2016

Background information
- Genre: Rock
- Occupation: Record producer
- Years active: 1986–present

Rob Schnapf is an American record producer. He was the co-producer (along with Tom Rothrock) of Elliott Smith's albums Either/Or, XO (on which he also played guitar on the song "Baby Britain"), Figure 8 and From a Basement on the Hill, for which he was recruited by Smith's family to complete after Smith's death.

Schnapf runs the Mant Sounds studio.

== Background ==
Schnapf, along with Rothrock and partner Bradshaw Lambert, started Bong Load Custom Records in the early 1990s which is notable for releasing Beck's "Loser" single. Schnapf first heard Beck as he was playing on the street during the annual Sunset Junction Fair. A week later Rothrock saw Beck jump onstage to play in between bands during a show at Jabberjaw and approached him afterwards about recording his songs. Together Rothrock, Schnapf, Beck and Karl Stephenson recorded the bulk of what would become "Loser", and subsequently Mellow Gold, Beck's first major label album. Rothrock and Schnapf would continue to record with Beck working on material for what was intended to be his follow-up to Mellow Gold, a somber acoustic affair meant to silence detractors that claimed he was a one hit wonder joke act. Beck eventually had a change of heart and went on to record Odelay with The Dust Brothers only using one song from the Rothrock/Schnapf sessions, "Ramshackle", as the album closer.

Schnapf and Rothrock produced the 1993 Dog Society album entitled Test Your Own Eyes.

Schnapf later produced Guided By Voices' second of two TVT Records releases, Isolation Drills, in 2001 and The Vines debut album Highly Evolved in 2002. In 2003, he produced Saves The Day's album, In Reverie. In 2005, he produced Nine Black Alps' debut album Everything Is.

Schnapf has also worked in conjunction with Australian band Powderfinger in the production of their sixth studio album Dream Days at the Hotel Existence.

Schnapf produced Brooklyn-based artist Kevin Devine's major label debut Put Your Ghost to Rest. Following the success of the partnership, Schnapf was also recruited to produce Devine's "Another Bag of Bones", a single released prior to Devine's follow-up album. This was followed by work with The Whigs on their debut Mission Control for ATO Records.

Schnapf worked with Australian rock band Kisschasy on their third studio album, Seizures, and Wild Light's debut for Startime International Records. Schnapf then worked with Booker T. Jones on his Grammy winning Potato Hole album featuring the Drive By Truckers and Neil Young. He also worked with Dr. Dog and Toadies' 2010 release of Feeler.

Schnapf produced Canadian indie-rock band Tokyo Police Club's 2010 second album Champ.

== Production discography ==
- 1993: Test Your Own Eyes – Dog Society (Co-producer w/ Tom Rothrock)
- 1994: Mellow Gold – Beck (co-producer)
- 1994: Rubberneck – Toadies (Co-producer w/ Tom Rothrock)
- 1995: Daredevil – Fu Manchu (Co-producer w/ Tom Rothrock and Fu Manchu)
- 1996: Mic City Sons - Heatmiser (Co-producer w/ Tom Rothrock and Heatmiser)
- 1997: Either/Or – Elliott Smith (Co-producer w/ Tom Rothrock)
- 1998: XO – Elliott Smith (Co-producer w/ Tom Rothrock)
- 1999: Mock Tudor – Richard Thompson (Co-producer w/ Tom Rothrock)
- 2000: Figure 8 – Elliott Smith (Co-producer w/ Tom Rothrock)
- 2001: Isolation Drills – Guided by Voices
- 2001: Stay What You Are – Saves the Day
- 2002: Your Majesty – The Anniversary
- 2002: Highly Evolved – The Vines
- 2003: In Reverie – Saves the Day
- 2003: La Musica Negra – Verbena
- 2004: From a Basement on the Hill – Elliott Smith
- 2004: Winning Days – The Vines
- 2005: Everything Is - Nine Black Alps
- 2006: Put Your Ghost To Rest – Kevin Devine
- 2007: Dream Days at the Hotel Existence – Powderfinger
- 2007: Scream And Light Up The Sky – The Honorary Title
- 2007: Heart Tuned To D.E.A.D. – Switches
- 2008: Mission Control – The Whigs
- 2008: Melodia – The Vines
- 2009: Adult Nights – Wild Light
- 2009: Potato Hole – Booker T. Jones (co-producer)
- 2009: Seizures – Kisschasy
- 2010: Champ – Tokyo Police Club
- 2010: Sweet Thing – Sweet Thing
- 2010: Shame, Shame – Dr. Dog
- 2012: Emerge – Dog Society
- 2012: "A Sleep & a Forgetting" – Islands
- 2013: Bulldozer – Kevin Devine
- 2013: FIDLAR – FIDLAR
- 2013: "Saves The Day" - Saves The Day
- 2014: Night Moves – H-Burns
- 2015: St. Catherine – Ducktails
- 2016: Cody – Joyce Manor
- 2016: Cold Coffee – Barrie-James O'Neill
- 2017: Lemon Cotton Candy Sunset – Richard Edwards
- 2018: Heaven – Dilly Dally
- 2018: Marlin Fisher – Henry Chadwick
- 2020: Alphabetland – X
- 2020: "Underground Forever"/"Hustlin" - Jonathan Tyler
- 2020: Lullaby For You - Greer
- 2021: Yak: A Collection of Truck Songs - Angel Du$t
- 2022: Canary Yellow – Soft Kill
- 2022: (watch my moves) – Kurt Vile (co-producer)
- 2022: 40 oz. to Fresno - Joyce Manor
- 2023: Come June - Mitch Rowland
- 2024: Smoke & Fiction – X
- 2025: Where the Earth Bends – Daffo (Gabi Gamberg)
- 2025: Whistling Pie - Mitch Rowland
- 2025: Big Smile - Greer
- 2026: Philadelphia's Been Good To Me - Kurt Vile
