= Craig Nicholls =

Australian musician

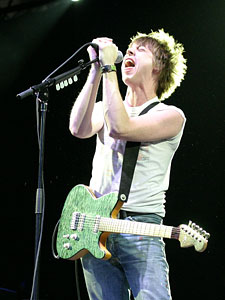
- Nicholls performing in December 2003

Background information
- Born: Craig Robert Nicholls; 31 August 1977 (age 49); Sydney, New South Wales, Australia
- Genres: Alternative rock; garage rock; post-grunge; grunge; indie rock; neo-psychedelia; garage punk; post-punk revival
- Occupations: Musician; songwriter; artist
- Instruments: Guitar; vocals; bass guitar
- Years active: 1994–present

Craig Robert Nicholls (born 31 August 1977) is an Australian musician, best known as the lead singer, songwriter, and guitarist of the Australian alternative rock band The Vines, of which he is the sole continuous member.

== Early life ==
Nicholls was born in Sydney. Terry Nicholls, his father, was the guitarist and vocalist in a 1960s group named The Vynes. He later worked as an accountant for Sony Music Australia. Nicholls has an older brother, Matt, an older sister, Tara, who is a solicitor, and a younger sister, Jessica. Nicholls' father taught him to play guitar during childhood. He spent his free time listening to The Beatles, painting artworks, and skateboarding. He stated, "I grew up a loner... I never socialised. I stayed at home and listened to music all day. Music became a mystical world."

Nicholls attended Marist College Penshurst until he dropped out of high school in year 10. He then enrolled in an art school for six months to study painting. He supported his ambition to become a musician by working at a McDonald's in Hurstville. There, he met future bandmates, bass guitarist Patrick Matthews and drummer David Olliffe. To form a quartet named Rishikesh, Nicholls also invited his schoolmate Ryan Griffiths to join as a guitarist. Nicholls chose the band's name, Rishikesh, which originally referred to a city in India where The Beatles had attended an ashram. Reviewing early gigs, newspapers would misprint the name as "Rishi Chasms", so Nicholls decided to change it to The Vines, as a reference to his father's group.

== Music career ==
Nicholls commenced his song writing career at the time when The Vines began live performances. Initial shows included performances at backyard parties and a presence on a local radio station. Gaining popularity in Sydney, the band attracted the attention of Capitol Records. Nicholls continued to compose songs, writing Factory, the band's first single, which became NME's Single of the Week in November 2001. At the ARIA Music Awards of 2002, The Vines won Best Breakthrough Artist – Single for Get Free, which was also written by Nicholls. At the APRA Music Awards of 2003 he won the Breakthrough Songwriter Award.

Griffiths, Heald and Rosser eventually left the band, and Nicholls returned with new band members for the release of The Vines' independently-released sixth album Wicked Nature, described as a "comeback" by Darren Levin of the Faster Louder online music publication. Nicholls also produced the album that was recorded with Tim John (bass) and Lachy West (drums) of the band The Griswolds. Regarding the departure of his former bandmates, Nicholls explained in August 2014, "It's not the most comfortable thing [to talk about... it's just a shame that it didn't work out."

Several of Nicholls' paintings are used for The Vines' releases, including for the albums Highly Evolved, Winning Days (self portrait only), and singles Highly Evolved, and Outtathaway!. Nicholls' work on Highly Evolved was nominated for Best Cover Art at the 2002 ARIA Awards.

== Personal life ==
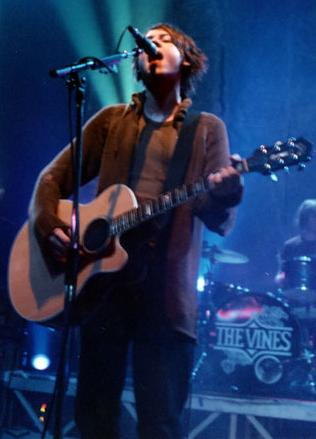
Nicholls with The Vines in March 2004

By 2002, Nicholls had gained a reputation as an erratic performer. In August, The Vines performed Get Free on Late Show with David Letterman, with Nicholls destroying Hamish Rosser's drum kit. In December, they were prevented from performing on The Tonight Show with Jay Leno after Nicholls damaged the set during a rehearsal. His behaviour was seen as "a sign of stress and mental exhaustion".

In May 2004, The Vines appeared at a promotional show for radio station Triple M, where Nicholls bleated at the audience and demanded they not talk during the band's performance. As a result of this and other aggressive behaviour by Nicholls, Matthews left the stage and quit the band with immediate effect. He later joined the band Youth Group and did not perform with The Vines again for another 14 years. Triple M subsequently banned the group's music from being broadcast by their station. Further performances on their Australian, United States, and European tours to promote their second album, Winning Days, were cancelled.

In November 2004, accompanied by his brother Matt and his manager and friend Andy Kelly, Nicholls faced assault and malicious damage charges at Balmain Local Court in Sydney. During the hearing it was revealed that Nicholls has autism spectrum disorder. His condition had been suspected by road crew veteran Tony Bateman, and was confirmed by Tony Attwood, an autism spectrum disorder specialist, in August 2004. The judge dropped all charges against Nicholls on the condition that he seek immediate treatment. He was under medical treatment and therapy for six months, and stopped his intake of fast food and cannabis. He spoke about his condition in subsequent interviews.

In November 2008, The Vines cancelled shows in Australia and Japan, as Nicholls' mental health had deteriorated over the previous month. Nicholls was arrested on 13 October 2012 at his Sydney home on allegations he had assaulted his parents, and injured a responding police officer as he resisted arrest. He appeared before a judge at Sutherland Local Court on 17 October 2012, where a trial date of 14 November was set. The charges include "two counts of domestic assault, assault occasioning actual bodily harm, stalking and resisting arrest".

In a 2014 Rolling Stone Australia article, Nicholls revealed that he had moved back into the family home in 2013 after receiving medical intervention. On the subject of his mental health, he said:

I have been out of my mind a couple of times in my life ... To me, that's just what I'm like. When I was younger it seemed cool to be crazy. I'm not trying to be crazy now. I'm trying to be normal. What's important to me is my family and making the albums.

In an August 2014 interview with the DIY publication, Nicholls explained that he manages his condition by rarely socialising, stating: "I'm just following my instincts so... that's alright." During the same interview, he also revealed that he shuns 21st-century technology, such as smartphones and computers, as he prefers to minimise his responsibilities and live "like a kid". Nicholls maintained that music has "really been the thing that saved me".
