= Wayne Connolly =

- Born: Wayne Paul Connolly
- Occupations: Music producer; audio engineer; musician; composer/songwriter
- Instruments: Guitar; vocals
- Years active: 1991–present
- Member of: Knievel
- Formerly of: The Welcome Mat
- Website: wayneconnolly.com.au

Wayne Paul Connolly is an Australian music producer, audio engineer and musician. From 1991 to 1997 Connolly played lead guitar and sang in guitar group The Welcome Mat and released two studio albums. Since 1994, he has played in Knievel with Tracy Ellis and Nick Kennedy. Knievel have released four studio albums and a compilation of B-sides and rarities.

== Career ==
=== Musician ===
Connolly formed The Welcome Mat in 1990 with Cory Messenger on vocals and guitar, Pete Bennett on drums (ex-Fiction Romance) and Dave Moss on bass guitar. Leo Mullins (of The Benedicts) replaced Moss on bass guitar in 1991. They released two albums Gram (1993) and Lap of Honour (1996) before disbanding in 1997. Australian musicologist, Ian McFarlane says, "[they] started out as a chirpy, jangly guitar pop outfit before heading in a tougher, though still melodic and harmony-laced, power pop direction."

In 1994 Connolly formed Knievel on lead guitar and vocals with Tracy Ellis (ex-Oliver) on bass guitar and Nick Kennedy (ex-Templebears, Big Heavy Stuff) on drums. The group have issued four studio albums, We Fear Change (1995), Steep Hill Climb (1997), The Name Rings a Bell That Drowns out Your Voice (2000) and Emerald City (2012) as well as a B-sides and demos compilation No One's Going to Understand in My Way. Knievel achieved rotation on national youth radio Triple J with several singles, toured locally and internationally, and supported bands such as Luna, Teenage Fanclub, and Death Cab for Cutie.

=== Production and audio engineering ===
Connolly has balanced playing music with a varied career as a producer and engineer for Australian artists, including Josh Pyke, The Vines, Boy & Bear, Paul Dempsey, Youth Group, Underground Lovers, Died Pretty, Hoodoo Gurus and You Am I.

In the early 1990s he took a job managing Paradise Studios for rooART, which put him in touch with emerging artists providing songs for the Youngblood compilation series. Among these were Underground Lovers, Glide, and Custard, all of whom formed working relationships with the producer. Production credits from the 1990s include Wahooti Fandango by Custard, Fill Yourself With Music by Screamfeeder, The Young Need Discipline, Lazy Highways and Future Spa by The Fauves, In Your Bright Ray by The Go-Betweens' Grant McLennan, and Sold by Died Pretty.

Since the early 2000s, Connolly has also worked with Neil Finn, Cloud Control, Dallas Crane, Sarah Blasko, Silverchair, Jimmy Barnes, The Living End, Grinspoon, Powderfinger, The Veronicas, Midnight Oil's Jim Moginie, Halfway, Dappled Cities, Old Man River, The Grates, Turnstyle and many more. Recent credits include albums for The Apartments, Community Radio, All Our Exes Live in Texas, Husky, Hungry Kids of Hungary, Knievel, Sounds Like Sunset, Babe Rainbow, Tim Hart, Perry Keyes and The Paper Kites.

=== Film and television ===
In addition to his work in the music recording industry, Connolly has produced work for film and television. His credits include Friday On My Mind, The Kettering Incident, Love Child, The Black Balloon, Newcastle, Little Fish, Monkey Puzzle, Mullet, Willful and Dirty Deeds. The track, "When We Get There", produced for The Black Balloon, won best song at the 2008 AGSC/APRA awards.

== Studios ==
From 2007 to 2015, Connolly worked largely from his own studio within the Albert Music premises in Sydney where he housed his restored Neve 8026 desk.

Since 2016 he has worked extensively at Hercules Street Studios in Sydney and at the newly-refurbished Music Farm Studios in Byron Bay.

== Selected credits ==
Credits:

- 1992:

Leaves Me Blind by Underground Lovers

- 1993:

Coprolalia by You Am I
Sound as Ever by You Am I

- 1994:

Dream It Down by Underground Lovers
Wahooti Fandango by Custard
The Young Need Discipline by The Fauves

- 1995:

Hi Fi Way by You Am I (selected tracks)
Higher Up the Firetrails by Bluebottle Kiss
Sold by Died Pretty

- 1996:

Hourly Daily by You Am I
Rushall Station by Underground Lovers
Disappear Here by Glide
Future Spa by The Fauves

- 1997:

In Your Bright Ray by Grant McLennan
Steep Hill Climb by Knievel

- 1998:

Lazy Highways by The Fauves
Using My Gills as a Roadmap by Died Pretty

- 1999:

Sweeter Than the Radio by Icecream Hands
King Autumn by Hoolahan

- 2000:

Everydaydream by Died Pretty
Urban & Eastern by Youth Group
The Name Rings a Bell that Drowns out your Voice by Knievel

- 2001:

Size of the Ocean by Big Heavy Stuff
First Translated in 1965 by Ides of Space
Griffith Sunset EP by Evan Dando

- 2002:

Drag (EP) by Drag
We Got This! by New Christs

- 2004:

Dallas Crane by Dallas Crane
Skeleton Jar by Youth Group
The Truth About Love by David McCormack & The Polaroids
Dear Friends and Enemies by Big Heavy Stuff
Farewell to the Fainthearted by Halfway

- 2006:

Forever Young by Youth Group
Factory Girls by Dallas Crane
Casino Twilight Dogs by Youth Group
Vision Valley by The Vines
Nervous Flashlights by The Fauves
Flame Trees by Sarah Blasko
Remember The River by Halfway

- 2007:

The Bells Line by 78 Saab
Memories & Dust by Josh Pyke

- 2008:

When Good Times Go Good by The Fauves
Chimney's Afire by Josh Pyke
Easy Fever: A Tribute to the Easybeats and Stevie Wright by Various Artists (including Neil Finn, Jimmy Barnes and Iva Davies)

- 2009:

Zounds by Dappled Cities
Everything Is True by Paul Dempsey
Ragged & Ecstatic (select tracks) by Yves Klein Blue

- 2010:

An Outpost of Promise by Halfway

- 2012:

Young North by The Paper Kites
Serious Magic by Community Radio
Emerald City/Through the Rainbow Dark by Knievel

- 2013:

Harlequin Dream by Boy & Bear
You're A Shadow by Hungry Kids of Hungary
States by The Paper Kites
Lemons by Woodlock

- 2014:

Labour of Love by Woodlock
Echoes in the Aviary by Jane Tyrell
Broken Lines by Patrick James
We Could Leave Tonight by Sounds Like Sunset

- 2015:

Baby Blue by Noire
No Song, No Spell, No Madrigal by The Apartments

- 2016:

Look Now You're Cursed by Community Radio
When We Fall by All Our Exes Live in Texas
Zone by Cloud Control

- 2018:

Jim Salmon's Lament by Perry Keyes
The Narrow Corner by Tim Hart

- 2021:

Changing Colours by Babe Rainbow
To Find Happiness by Josh Pyke (selected tracks)

- 2022:

Chariot of the Gods by Hoodoo Gurus

- 2023:

Treats by Victoria (selected tracks)

== Awards and nominations ==
In 1992, Connolly produced the Underground Lovers album, Leaves Me Blind, and subsequently received Rolling Stone magazine's Best Australian Record award. The following year he engineered You Am I's fourth EP Coprolalia and their debut album Sound As Ever, alongside Lee Ranaldo of Sonic Youth. This album went on to win the 1993 ARIA for Best Alternative Release. He has received numerous ARIA nominations and awards for his work, including Producer of the Year for his work on Josh Pyke's Memories and Dust in 2007, and Engineer of the Year for his work on Paul Dempsey's "Fast Friends" in 2010.

- 1996 – ARIA Engineer of the Year for You Am I, Hourly Daily
- 2007 – ARIA Engineer of the Year for Josh Pyke, Memories and Dust
- 2007 – ARIA Award for Producer of the Year for Josh Pyke, Memories and Dust
- 2010 – ARIA Engineer of the Year for Paul Dempsey, "Fast Friends"

Nominations

- 2006 – ARIA Producer of the Year for Youth Group, Casino Twilight Dogs
- 2006 – ARIA Engineer of the Year for The Vines, Vision Valley
- 2009 – ARIA Producer of the Year for Paul Dempsey, "Everything is True"
- 2023 – ARIA Engineer of the Year for The Teskey Brothers, "The Winding Way"
