= Fauve =

Fauve or Fauves may refer to:

Fauvism, an art movement, or

== Music ==
- Fauve (collective), French arts collective of music and videography
- The Fauves (band), an Australian rock band
  - The Fauves (album)
- Fauve (musician), stage name of Swiss musician and singer Nicolas Julliard (born 1972)

== People ==
- Stephan Fauve (born 1955), French physicist
- Fauve Hautot (born 1986), French dancer and choreographer
- John Paul Fauves, Costa Rican visual artist
- Fauve, name formerly used by comics artist and writer Holly Golightly

== Other uses ==
- Fauve (dog), a short legged hunting breed of dog
- Central African Republic national football team, nicknamed "Les Fauves"
- Fauve Software, a defunct company
- Fauve (film), a 2018 short film

== See also ==
- Fauvism, a style of painting
- Favre (disambiguation)
