= Set It Right =

Set It Right may refer to:

- "Set It Right", song by The Colourist from Will You Wait for Me (EP)
- "Set It Right", song by Hungry Kids of Hungary from Escapades (Hungry Kids of Hungary album) Hungry Kids of Hungary (EP)
- "Set It Right", song by American musician How to Dress Well. Total Loss (album)
- "To Set It Right" with Nichelle Nichols 1964 episode of The Lieutenant TV series
