= Labor of Love =

Labor of Love may refer to:

- The act of doing something as a hobby

== Film, television, plays ==
- Labor of Love (1998 film), a 1998 television film
- "Labor of Love" (Once Upon a Time), an episode of Once Upon a Time
- Labour of Love (play), a 2017 play by James Graham
- Labor of Love (TV series), a reality television series

== Music ==
- Labor of Love (Radney Foster album)
- Labor of Love (Janie Frickie album)
- Labor of Love (Sammy Kershaw album)
- Labor of Love (Spinners album), 1980
- Labour of Love, an album by UB40
- Labour of Love (Frente! EP), 1993, or the title track
- Labour of Love (Woodlock EP), 2014
- "Labour of Love" (song), a song by Hue and Cry
- Labor of Love, a 2016 album by Taj Mahal
