= White Collar Crime (disambiguation) =

White-collar crime is a form of financial crime.

White Collar Crime may refer to:

- "White Collar Crime", song by Private Line (band)
- "White Collar Crime", song by The Fauves from Thousand Yard Stare
- "White Collar Crime", song by Grace Jones from Inside Story
