= David Challinor (disambiguation) =

David Challinor may refer to:

- David Challinor (1920–2008), American biologist
- David Challinor (musician), see Sounds Like Sunset
- Dave Challinor (born 1975), English footballer
