= Rhubarb (band) =

Australian rock band

- Origin: Brisbane, Queensland, Australia
- Genres: Alternative rock
- Years active: 1996–2006
- Labels: Toupee Records; Inpop Records
- Members: Steve Drinkall; Dave Drinkall; Caleb James; Ian Buchanan
- Website: Official site

Rhubarb was an Australian rock band formed in Brisbane, Queensland in 1996. They are best known for their song "Exerciser", released in 1999.

== Biography ==
Rhubarb were formed in Brisbane, Queensland in 1996 by brothers Steve and David Drinkall with their Brazilian cousin Paul Harvey playing bass and Ian Buchanan on drums.

The group were discovered when they won the Triple J Unearthed competition for Brisbane with their song, "Zero", in 1999. The band's leap to prominence however came with their surprise 1999 hit "Exerciser", which placed at No. 20 on the 1999 Triple J's Hottest 100. Steve often joked that the success of Exerciser was mostly due to the song's short length and Triple J announcers often having to fill 2 minutes before the news was broadcast at a regular interval. The band's debut album, Kamikaze, released on the band's own independent label Toupee Records, achieved over 15,000 sales. Kamikaze was voted 'Album of the Year' at Queensland's 14th annual Sunnie Awards (1999), and the group also won 'Best New Band of 1999'. Songs from Kamikaze that aired on Triple J included "Zero", "Pennywise" and the title track. Rhubarb played live at The Big Day Out, Offshore, Homebake and the Falls Festival.

Their second album Slow Motion was greeted with critical acclaim in 2002, with radio hits like "Light on Your Shoulder", "New York". A string of national tours followed, where they played alongside bands including The Whitlams, You Am I, Spiderbait, The Cruel Sea, Creed and Killing Heidi. The Australian and The Courier-Mail both listed Slow Motion in their Top 10 Albums For 2002, while Rolling Stone Australia described it as "totally irresistible".

Completing the Slow Motion period in late 2003 with another successful national tour, Rhubarb went to ground, writing, rehearsing and testing out material live for their third album. With Caleb James once again filling the producer's shoes, Start Again, was created throughout 2004, and released in 2005.

In September 2006 the band announced their break up on their official website, citing that they lacked the "enthusiasm to keep spending our time and money on what is essentially a pretty self-serving venture." They also stated that the members would continue to make music individually.

Rhubarb played their last gig at Brisbane nightclub The Zoo to a sold-out audience. Long time touring partners Grand Atlantic as well as Hunz supported.

In December 2023, the band's material was released on streaming services for the first time, alongside the compilation Exerciser: The Singles.

== Discography ==
=== Studio albums ===
Year	Album details
1999	Kamikaze: Released: July 1999; Label: Toupee Records
2002	Slow Motion: Released: March 2002; Label: Toupee Records
2005	Start Again: Released: September 2005; Label: Toupee Records

=== Compilation albums ===
Year	Album details
2023	Exerciser: The Singles: Released: December 2023; Label: Toupee Records, SGC
