= Dogs Are the Best People =

1996 single by The Fauves

Single by the Fauves
- Recorded: Sing Sing, Hothouse, Melbourne and Charing Cross, Sydney
- Genre: Indie rock
- Label: Polydor Records
- Producer(s): Wayne Connolly, Greg Wales

"Dogs Are the Best People" is a single by Australian rock band the Fauves, the second from the album Future Spa. It reached number 20 in the Triple J Hottest 100, 1996.

== Details ==
Singer Cox later said in the period before recording, their record company was keen to find some potential singles, and, "they weren't keen on that one. I still have somewhere quite a harsh critique of the song from the record company. We'd already started playing it live, and for a band that was used to people staring at us nonplussed, suddenly there was this song that people had never heard and started bouncing around in the crowd. We had an inkling that maybe we had written a song that a few people might like, so we stuck to our guns."

On their website, the Fauves wrote, "This is a remedial level song to play but the tab might be a bit confusing. Just take note of the chord positions and listen to the record - it will all become very clear. Although the tuning is CGDFAA# you actually only need 2 strings. All a bit embarrassing really.

Cox later noted, "I feel to this day that we got known somehow as a novelty band, which was just so far from what we were about. The song itself wasn't even really supposed to be about dogs. It was supposed to be more about people. But that subtext got overlooked. 'Novelty song' is probably too harsh a term but that kind of angle was the sort of thing that was getting air play."

== Reception ==
AllMusic called the song "guitar pop at its best" and noted that it was "amazingly, [a] mainstream Australian hit". Beat Magazine said the song had, "entered Australia's popular music lexicon" and "epitomised the irreverent wit that defined the era in alternative music, embodying a sense of misanthropic sarcasm that revelled in being the outsider."

Australian Prime Minister, Anthony Albanese, named it as one of his favourite songs on ABC Radio Melbourne.

Double J named it in the top fifty Australian songs of the 1990s, saying, "Read the lyrics, listen to the melody and try to argue with this song's inclusion in this list. I'd say it's a shame that they're best remembered because of something so light-hearted, but genius comes in all forms."

== Personnel ==
- Phil Leonard — vocals, guitar
- Andrew Cox — vocals, guitar
- Andrew Dyer — bass, vocals
- Adam Newey — drums, vocals
