= Hungry Kids of Hungary =

Australian indie pop band

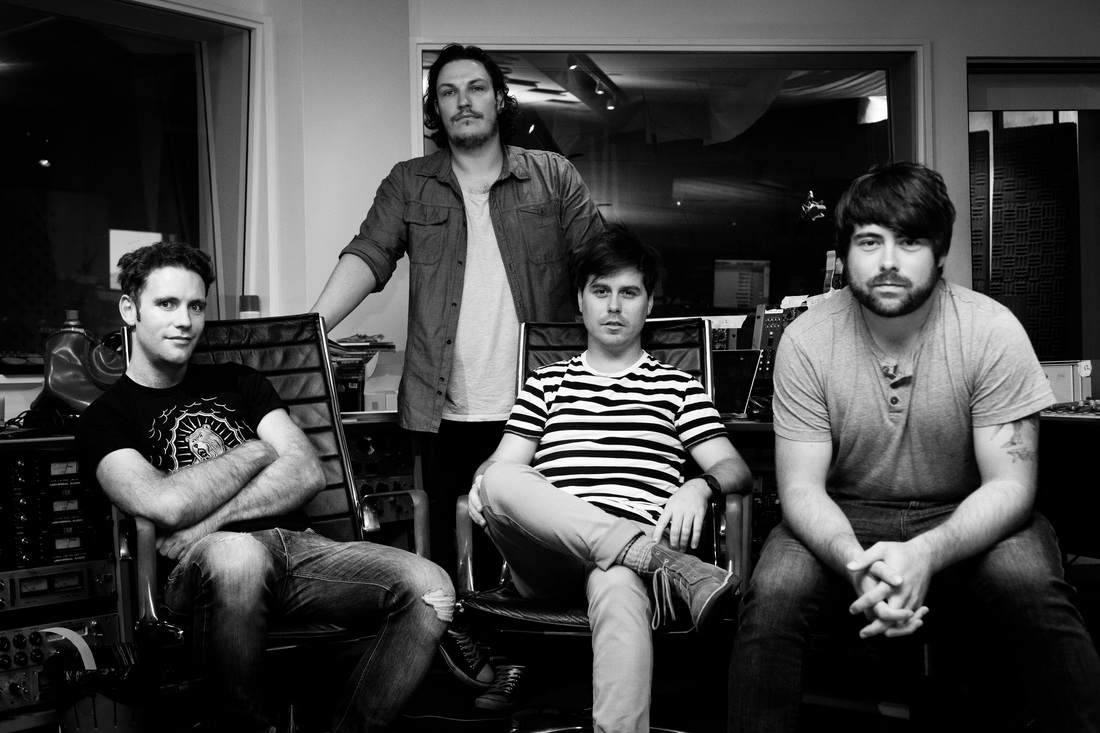
- Hungry Kids of Hungary at Albert's Studios in Sydney. L-R: Kane Mazlin, Ryan Strathie, Dean McGrath, Ben Dalton

Background information
- Origin: Brisbane, Australia
- Genres: Indie pop
- Years active: 2007–2013
- Labels: Stop Start
- Members: Ben Dalton; Kane Mazlin; Dean McGrath; Ryan Strathie
- Past members: Remy Boccalatte

Hungry Kids of Hungary (often shortened to HKOH) were an Australian four-piece indie pop band from Brisbane, Queensland. The band consisted of Dean McGrath (lead vocals, guitar), Kane Mazlin (lead vocals, keys), Ben Dalton (bass guitar, vocals) and Ryan Strathie (drums, vocals). The band released two studio albums, both peaking inside the Australian top 30.

== History ==
=== 2007-2009: Origins and EPs ===
The Hungry Kids of Hungary were formed in mid-2007 by drummer, Ryan Strathie. Their debut single, "Set it Right" was released in May 2008 and the band launched their self-titled debut EP at the Brisbane venue The Zoo in mid-2008. The EP quickly garnered attention from the Australian music industry, most notably that of Triple J's Richard Kingsmill who played songs from the EP on high rotation.

In December 2008, the band were announced as the Queensland winners of Triple J Unearthed Competition which entitled them to play at the Big Day Out on the Gold Coast.

The band's second EP Mega Mountain was released in April 2009, produced by Matt Redlich and released via MGM Distribution and the single "Scattered Diamonds" reached top 5 on the AIR Charts A second single "Old Money" was issued with a remix of "Scattered Diamonds" which became a dancefloor hit at Purple Sneakers in Sydney. At the 2009 Q Song Awards, "Set it Right" won Alternative Song of the Year.

In October 2009, the band released "Let You Down", the lead single from their forthcoming debut studio album.

=== 2010-2011: Escapades ===
In April 2010, the band released "Wristwatch". In August 2010, the band released "Coming Around" and confirmed they had signed a two-album deal with new EMI Music offshoot label Stop Start and released their debut studio album Escapades in October 2010. Escapades peaked at number 24 on the ARIA Charts.

At the 2010 Q Song Awards, "Wristwatch" also won Best Alternative and Song of the Year.

In March 2011, the band embarked on an overseas tour. In November 2011, the band signed a deal with Rough Trade in the Benelux, who released Escapades, following the success of single "Scattered Diamonds" on radio stations 3FM and Kink FM.

=== 2012-2013: You're a Shadow and break up ===
By May 2012, the band had completed the recording of their second album with producer Wayne Connolly at Albert's Studios in Sydney. They headed overseas to begin mixing with Simon "Berkfinger" Berckelman in Berlin before a full tour of the UK and Europe that included an appearance at the Pinkpop Festival in the Netherlands.

Touring guitarist Alex Bennison was added to the lineup for these dates, replacing the previous fifth member Remy Boccalatte.

"Sharp Shooter" was released as the album's lead single in August 2012. You're a Shadow was released February 2013 and peaked at number 18 on the ARIA Charts. The album spawned three other singles, "Twin Cities", "When Yesterday's Gone" and "Do or Die" over 2013.

On 28 November 2013, the band announced their intention to split.

== Discography ==
=== Studio albums ===
Title	Details	Peak chart positions
Title	Details	AUS
Escapades	Released: October 2010; Label: Stop Start (SSM5/SSM6); Format: CD, digital download	24
You're a Shadow	Released: February 2013; Label: Stop Start (SSM52); Format: CD, digital download	18

=== EPs ===
Title	Details
Hungry Kids of Hungary	Released: August 2008; Label: Hungry Kids of Hungary (MBHK002220); Format: CD, digital download
Mega Mountain	Released: April 2009; Label: Hungry Kids of Hungary (MBHK592514); Format: CD, digital download

=== Singles ===
Title	Year	Album
"Set It Right"	2008	Hungry Kids of Hungary
"Scattered Diamonds"	2009	Mega Mountain
"Old Money"	2009	Mega Mountain
"Let You Down"	2009	Escapades
"Wristwatch"	2010	Escapades
"Coming Around"	2010	Escapades
"Come Together" (with Ball Park Music)	2011	Non-album single
"Sharp Shooter"	2012	You're a Shadow
"Twin Cities"	2013	You're a Shadow
"When Yesterday's Gone"	2013	You're a Shadow
"Do or Die"	2013	You're a Shadow

== Awards ==
=== Q Song Awards ===
The Queensland Music Awards (previously known as Q Song Awards) are annual awards celebrating Queensland, Australia's brightest emerging artists and established legends. They commenced in 2006.

Year	Nominee / work	Award	Result (wins only)
2009	"Set It Right"	Alternative Song of the Year	Won
2010	"Wrist Watch"	Song of the Year	Won
2010	"Wrist Watch"	Alternative Song of the Year	Won
