= When Good Times Go Good =

Studio album by The Fauves
- Released: September 2008
- Recorded: Albert's Studios, Neutral Bay, Sydney
- Genre: Indie rock
- Length: 42:33
- Label: Shock Records
- Producer: Jim Moginie, Wayne Connolly

The Fauves chronology
Nervous Flashlights (2006)	When Good Times Go Good (2008)	Japanese Engines (2011)

Professional ratings
Review scores
Source	Rating
The Age	3/5 stars

When Good Times Go Good is the ninth album by Mornington Peninsula, Melbourne indie band The Fauves. It was recorded in the Sydney harbourside suburb of Neutral Bay with regular Fauves producer Wayne Connolly and Midnight Oil's Jim Moginie; the latter also contributed piano, electronic keyboard and extra guitar to several songs. The album title was conceived in a swimming pool in Thailand.

== Reception ==
FasterLouder said, "the group’s latest effort is an upper. It’s a collection of cruisey melodic pep tunes doused in biting lyrical mischief. It’s hard not to feel a little warm and fuzzy about a group that favours personal satisfaction over the glamour of playing rock stars." Time Off noted, "The Fauves continue to churn out some this country’s best music. Their ninth album, its release is an impressive achievement."

The Age said, "Cox, an equal-opportunity misanthrope, thankfully retains a sense of humour even at his most bitter. His fellow frontman, Phil Leonard, a less prolific presence than Cox on recent releases, has found a mellower path where acceptance and bemusement coexist." The "glut of gently mid-tempo tunes" was mentioned as a negative.

== Track listing ==
All songs by The Fauves

1. "Underwhelmed" – 2:40
2. "Love Radar" – 4:02
3. "Fight Me: I'm 40" – 2:48
4. "Baby Dale" – 3:58
5. "Best Work Alone" – 4:07
6. "Back to Being Me" – 3:14
7. "Sunday Drive" – 3:31
8. "Get Me Through the Night" – 3:27
9. "How We Gonna Live?" – 3:48
10. "Explorers Who Didn't Find Anything" – 3:23
11. "Get In Line" – 2:55
12. "Out On Your Own" – 4:38

== Personnel ==
- Andrew Cox - Guitar, vocals
- Philip Leonard - Guitar, vocals
- Adam Newey - Drums, vocals
- Timothy Cleaver - Bass, vocals
- Jim Moginie - Piano, electronic keyboard, guitar
