= Driveway Heart Attack =

Album by The Fauves

Studio album by The Fauves
- Released: 31 May 2019
- Studio: Ted's House of Sound; Incubator Recording
- Genre: Indie rock
- Length: 70:59
- Label: Self-released
- Producer: Adrian Akkerman; Timothy Cleaver

The Fauves chronology
German Engines (2012)	Driveway Heart Attack (2019)

Driveway Heart Attack is the twelfth studio album by Australian indie rock band, The Fauves, which was released on 31 May 2019 as a double album via Shock Records. To promote the album they supported Regurgitator on the latter's 25th anniversary tour in October–November 2019.

== Critical reception ==
Geoff Jenke of Eventalaide observed, "the witty lyrics are still with them on their new album ... the music has a catchy hook to it and stills sounds fresh." Consume's writer described how, "its songs of quiet melancholy, fake positivity and misdirected longing are carefully curated to ensure that that listeners must expend maximum effort to access their favourites. You can try to skip songs but you risk scratching the record."

== Track listing ==
All tracks are written by Andrew Ian Cox, except where noted.

Driveway Heart Attack CD 1
No.	Title	Length
1.	"Muezzin for the Older Guy"	3:17
2.	"Gone South" (Philip Daniel Leonard)	3:39
3.	"Back on the Gear"	2:52
4.	"Bengal Lancer"	3:02
5.	"Swinging to the Right"	4:24
6.	"Overseer" (Leonard)	3:50
7.	"Light and Frothy"	2:57
8.	"The Visible Signs of Ageing"	3:28
9.	"Beta Males"	3:17
10.	"The Ocean Just Came" (Leonard)	2:55
11.	"Simon, Tahiti"	3:29
Total length:		37:10

All tracks are written by Andrew Ian Cox, except where noted.

Driveway Heart Attack CD 2
No.	Title	Length
1.	"Waiting for the Solo" (Philip Daniel Leonard)	3:14
2.	"The Equality of the Sexiness"	2:40
3.	"Quitting the Army"	3:14
4.	"Notice Me" (Leonard)	2:43
5.	"Pluto Is no Longer a Planet"	2:57
6.	"Cult Classic" (Leonard)	2:42
7.	"Colt-Style Thinking" (Leonard)	3:10
8.	"Debbie" (Leonard)	3:35
9.	"Old Airforce Buddy"	2:43
10.	"Eurozone"	3:34
11.	"Sinking Feeling" (Leonard)	3:17
Total length:		33:49

== Personnel ==
- Andrew Cox – guitar, vocals
- Philip Leonard – guitar, vocals
- Adam Newey – drums, vocals
- Timothy Cleaver – bass guitar, vocals
