= Black & White Town =

Studio album by Perry Keyes
- Released: 17 November 2023
- Studio: The House Studio, Sydney
- Label: EH Records
- Producer: Michael Carpenter

Black & White Town is the sixth studio album by Australian artist Perry Keyes, released in November 2023.

== Details ==
Many of the songs for the album were older. The title track had been played live "for the best part of thirty-odd years" and most were decades old. Keyes had been recording another album when he was awarded a grant from the Australia Council to record an album with songs set in Waterloo. Long time guitarist, Ed Kairouz, had encouraged Keyes to use previously unrecorded songs going back to his days in the Stolen Holdens. Keyes said, "These are stories of displacement, anarchy, homelessness and of people trying to hang onto each other in the face of what's happening on the hard streets of the inner-city right now."

The album was recorded relatively quickly, with Kairouz joining Keyes on guitar and producer Michael Carpenter playing bass, drums and keyboards. Keyes said he wanted the album to have an End of the Century, Phil Spector big sound.

The song "Last Night in Redfern Park" had been written was Keyes was 17. He said that up until that point he has been writing songs that were, "derivative, generic stuff trying to sound like the Ramones or trying to sound like bloody Lou Reed". With lyrics from things he observed on a bus trip though Sydney, it was the first time he realised he wanted to write about the place he grew up.

"Fence" references the death of 17-year-old TJ Hickey who was killed when he was impaled on a fence in Waterloo. Riding his bike, he was being followed by police at the time. His death inspired the 2004 Redfern riots.

== Reception ==
The Australian's Mark Mordue wrote, "I am simply amazed Keyes can come out swinging again on Black & White Town like his life depended on it. Opener "Last Night in Redfern Park" goes off like a hybrid of Elvis Costello and the Clash, riffing off jump-cut images of junkies, punks, drunks and kids in trouble. Like all great writers, Keyes watches closely, and keeps in mind his songs might actually reach the ears of those he writes about."

Bernard Zuel named it one of his albums of the year, calling it, "The inner life of the inner 'burbs, punched up with brass & verve". Post to Wire said, "Keyes is a poet as much as a musician and singer. His words describe vivid and moving scenes and vignettes. He doesn't attempt to paint a rosy picture, instead he sharpens his lens, takes off the filter and zooms in. In his own words. Keyes sets a lofty standard out of the gate and not unexpectedly he more than matches it across the nine songs that follow."

Rhythms Magazine had a number of staff vote the album in their top ten for the year.

== Track listing ==
All songs written by Perry Keyes.

1. "Last Night in Redfern Park"
2. "Elevator Down"
3. "Inner-City Now"
4. "Walking At Midnight Through the Lot"
5. "Cracker Night"
6. "Streets of a Black & White Town"
7. "Down On My Street"
8. "Fence"
9. "Billy Boy"
10. "Abandoned Car Problems"

== Personnel ==
- Perry Keyes – Guitar & vocals
- Edmond Kairouz - Guitar, backing vocals
- Michael Carpenter - Bass, drums, keyboards, backing vocals
- Gabi Blisset - Strings
- Jed Zarb - Saxophones
- Cass Greaves and Amy Vee - Backing vocals
