= You're a Shadow =

Studio album by Hungry Kids of Hungary
- Released: February 2013
- Recorded: 2012
- Genre: Indie rock
- Label: Stop Start Music
- Producer: Wayne Connolly

Hungry Kids of Hungary chronology
Escapades (2010)	You're a Shadow (2013)

Singles from You're a Shadow
- 1. "Sharp Shooter" Released: August 2012; 2. "Twin Cities" Released: January 2013; 3. "When Yesterday's Gone" Released: March 2013; 4. "Do or Die" Released: July 2013

Professional ratings
Review scores
Source	Rating
Rolling Stone Australia	4/5 stars

You're a Shadow is the second and final studio album by Hungry Kids of Hungary. The album was released in February 2013 via Stop Start. The album was produced by Wayne Connolly at Alberts Studios in Sydney, Australia.

== Track listing ==
Standard edition
No.	Title	Writer(s)	Length
1.	"What in the World"	Dean McGrath	3:43
2.	"Sharp Shooter"	Kane Mazlin, Ryan Strathie	3:25
3.	"Someone Else's Fool"	Dean McGrath	3:17
4.	"When Yesterday's Gone"	Kane Mazlin, Dean McGrath, Jarrad Kritzstein	4:08
5.	"Wasting Away"	Dean McGrath	3:01
6.	"Colours"	Kane Mazlin, Ryan Strathie	4:06
7.	"Memo"	Kane Mazlin	4:02
8.	"Twin Cities"	Dean McGrath	2:44
9.	"Litter and Sand"	Kane Mazlin	2:24
10.	"Do or Die"	Dean McGrath	3:43
11.	"San Simeon"	Dean McGrath	5:04

Australian edition bonus disc
No.	Title	Writer(s)	Length
1.	"Young Wheels"	Kane Mazlin	3:35
2.	"Grizzly Gulch"	Kane Mazlin	3:21
3.	"Hang Up"	Ben Dalton, Dean McGrath	4:05
4.	"Blue Dunes"	Dean McGrath	3:39

== Charts ==
Chart (2013)	Peak position
Australian Albums (ARIA)	18
