= Footage Missing =

Studio album by The Fauves
- Released: 2002
- Genre: Indie rock
- Label: Shock Records
- Producer: The Fauves

The Fauves chronology
Thousand Yard Stare (2000)	Footage Missing (2002)	The Fauves (2004)

Footage Missing is the sixth studio album by Mornington Peninsula, Melbourne, Australia indie band The Fauves.

Cox said, "The concept was simply to go and make another good record. We didn't workshop too many fancy scenarios - it's not possible on our kind of budgets. We didn't really have any strong ideas about what style of record we were going to make. We wrote a large number of songs over a period of about a year which resulted in a wide variety of styles coming through."

Discussing the album title, Cox said, "as you get older someone may be relating a story from the past and suddenly there's a blank. That happens a lot with us when we are crapping on. Footage Missing refers to that blank spot in your memory. I don't know where it went."

== Track listing ==
All songs by The Fauves

1. "Insert Your Life"
2. "Good Times Coming"
3. "Yo-Yo Craze"
4. "Ticket To The Big Time"
5. "Unsafe At Any Speed"
6. "One Of The Girls"
7. "LA '86"
8. "Nairobi Nights"
9. "Wendy"
10. "The Finest Choice"
11. "Phasing You In"
12. "Chaos And Dance"
13. "Right-Wing Fags"

== Personnel ==
- Andrew Cox - guitar, vocals
- Philip Leonard - guitar, vocals
- Adam Newey - drums, vocals
- Timothy Cleaver - bass, vocals
