= Halfway (band) =

Australian alt-country band

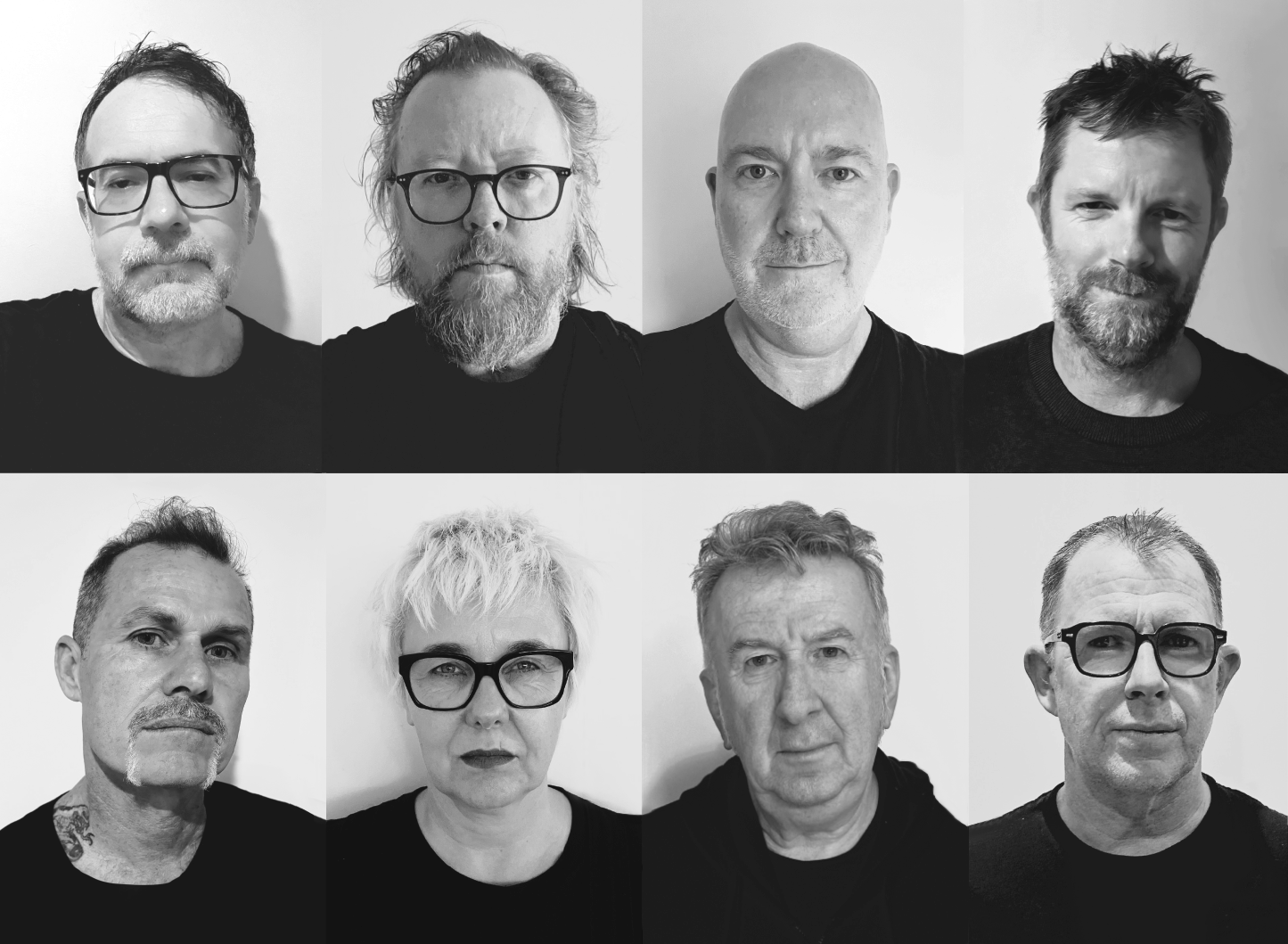
- Halfway, 2026

Background information
- Origin: Brisbane, Australia
- Genres: Indie rock, Space rock, Alt Country
- Years active: 2000–present
- Labels: Plus One Records, ABC Music Laughing Outlaw Records,
- Members: John Busby; Elwin Hawtin; Ben Johnson; Chris Dale; Noel Fitzpatrick; Liam Fitzpatrick; John Willsteed; Adele Pickvance
- Past members: Luke Peacock; Liam Bray; Ryan Walsh; Chris Hess; Chris Pickering
- Website: halfway.com.au

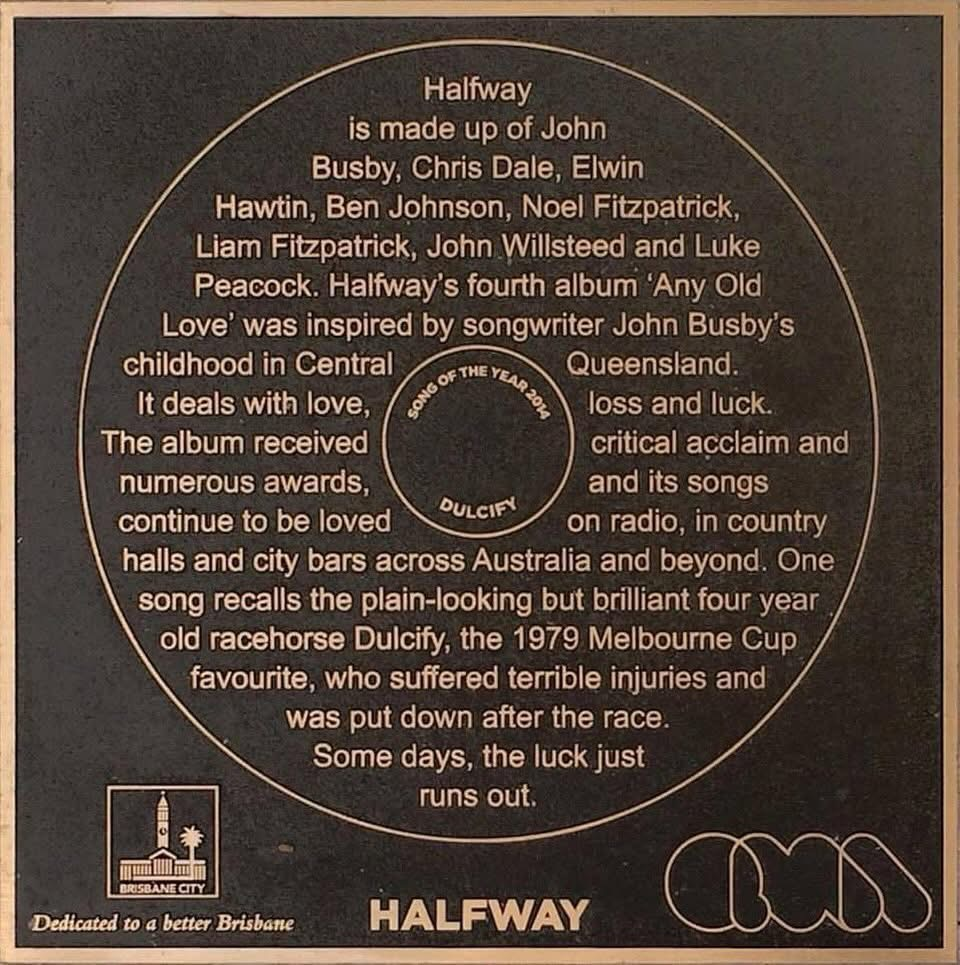
Halfway plaque on the Fortitude Valley Mall, Brisbane. QLD.

Halfway is a critically acclaimed eight-piece rock and alt-country band based in Brisbane, Australia. The group is known for blending indie rock with atmospheric Australian storytelling, often drawing inspiration from the landscapes of Central Queensland. Three of the bands founding members, John Busby, Elwin Hawtin and Chris Dale all originally hail from the Central Queensland town of Rockhampton.

== History ==
Halfway was formed in 2000 by John Busby, Elwin Hawtin, Ben Johnson and Chris Dale in Windsor, Brisbane. Dublin-born brothers Noel Fitzpatrick (pedal steel) and Liam Fitzpatrick (banjo/mandolin) joined in 2003. The lineup was later rounded out by two former members of The Go-Betweens. John Willsteed (lead guitar) in 2010 & Adele Pickvance (vocals and keys) in 2026.

Halfway's debut album Farewell to the Fainthearted was released in 2003 to warm critical acclaim. The band toured nationally, and their single "Patience Back" received high rotation airplay on Triple J. Farewell to the Fainthearted was included in The Courier-Mail's Top 10 albums of 2003.

In September 2006, Halfway released their second studio album, Remember the River. It was recorded by Wayne Connolly (The Vines, Josh Pyke, You Am I) the album saw Radio Birdman frontman Rob Younger in the producer's chair. The album received much acclaim from critics, and generated interest in Europe and the UK, where it received airplay on BBC Radio. Remember the River was included in The Courier-Mail's Top 10 albums of 2006.

In 2008, the band's core songwriting duo (Busby and Dale) were the recipients of one of Australia's most prestigious songwriting awards – The Grant McLennan Fellowship. The selection panel included members of the Go-Betweens, the McLennan family and Arts Queensland.

2009 saw the band recruit former Go-Betweens frontman Robert Forster to produce their third album. After months of rehearsal under Forster's guidance, a new LP was recorded, entitled An Outpost of Promise.

In 2010, the band added John Willsteed (ex-The Go-Betweens) on guitar, and Luke Peacock on keyboards.

In February 2014, Halfway released their fourth album, Any Old Love, which was again produced by Forster. At the AIR Awards of 2014, the album won Best Independent Country Album.

In 2015, the song "Dulcify" from Any Old Love won "Song of the Year" & "Best Country Song" at the Queensland Music Awards.

The band's fifth studio album, The Golden Halfway Record, was released in April 2016. It was recorded in Nashville, Tennessee, by lauded producer Mark Nevers (Calexico, Bonnie Prince Billy, George Jones), the album was met with a series of five star reviews.

2018 saw the release of the band's sixth album Rain Lover. Produced by Mark Nevers and Halfway, Rain Lover's central narrative is based around the life of John Busby's father. It is a story of big dreams, conflict and addiction with songs that include real people and characters from the Central Queensland town of Rockhampton in the 1960s-1980s. The album received a 5-star review in The Australian newspaper on the week of release.

During the covid lockdown in 2020, John Busby from Halfway started a podcast, A Band Called Halfway which focused on the making of the bands albums. The format included long form interviews with the various engineers, producers and managers who helped in the production of the records. The process outlines what it's like to be in an independent band for more than two decades in the new millennium. Interviewees include esteemed music industry figures like Robert Forster, Rob Younger, Peter Jesperson, Clinton Walker, Malcolm Burn, Mark Nevers and many more.

In 2021 the band released their seventh album, Restless Dream, a collaboration with Kamilaroi elder Bob Weatherall and didgeridoo player William Barton. The record's central themes are based around the work of Weatherall in the repatriation of Aboriginal remains from museums and institutions around the world. The album was nominated in the 2021 ARIA Music Awards for Best World Music Album.

The band's eighth studio album, On the Ghostline, with Hands of Lightning was released in August 2022 which was recorded by Yanto Browning and produced and mixed by Malcolm Burn (Bob Dylan, Iggy Pop, Emmylou Harris, Patti Smith & The Neville Brothers) at La Maison Bleu Studio, Kingston, NY. Tony Moore wrote in The Sydney Morning Herald: "Ghost nets floating lost at sea are the core image as the band trap the power of memories and sing of Australian dreams and triumphs".

In July 2025 Halfway released their ninth studio album, "The Styx". It was recorded by band members John Busby and Ben Johnson at their rehearsal space in Lutwyche, Qld. Once again the album was mixed by Mark Nevers at Beech House Recording, Pawleys Island S.C. The album is based around the story of two brothers, living and working with their families in the remote town of Stanage Bay, Central Queensland during the mid 1980's. The record received wide spread critical acclaim, and made numerous critics 'Best of' lists for 2025 including placing 5th in the Rhythms Magazine Readers poll for 'Best Australian Albums'.

== Discography ==
=== Studio albums ===
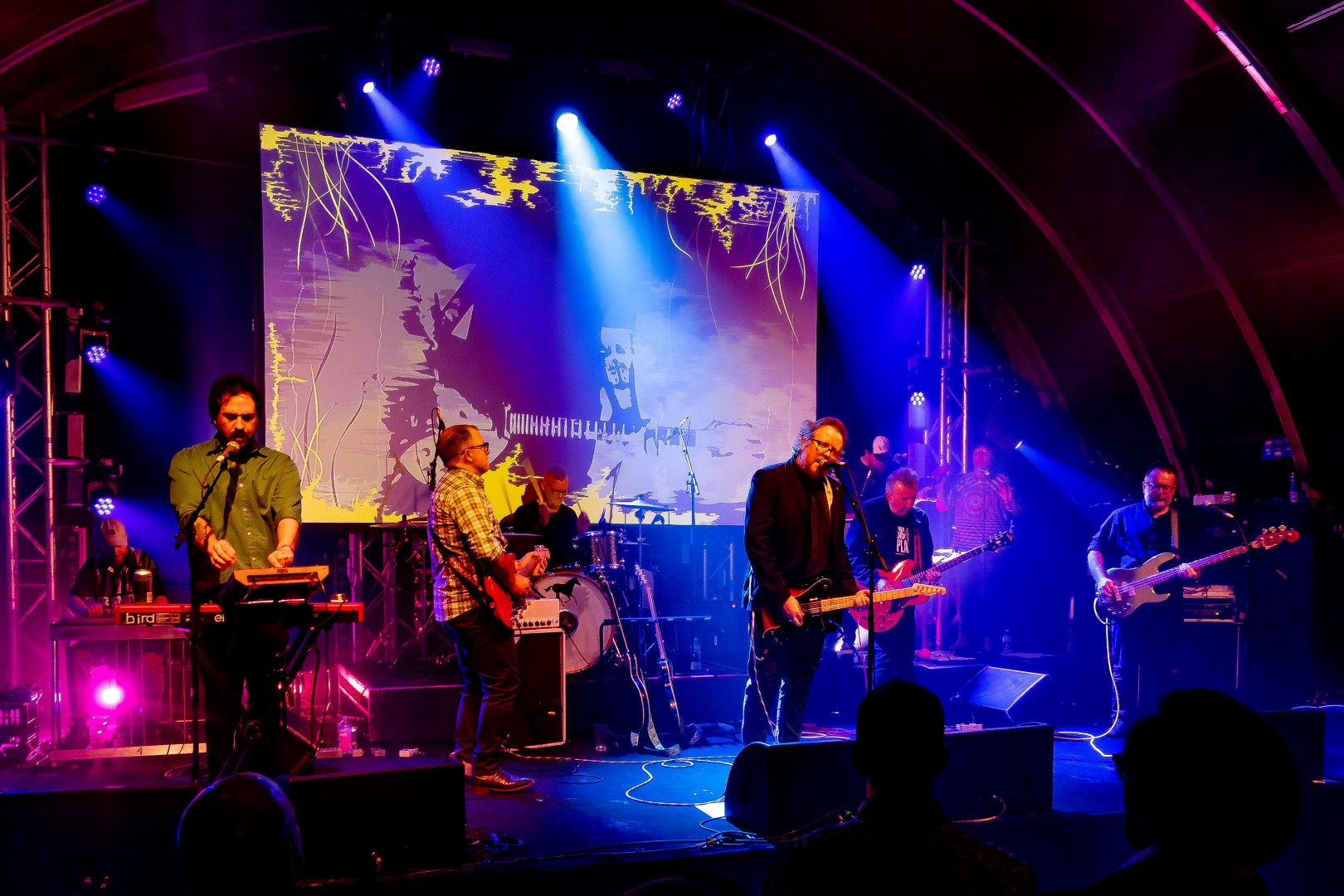
Halfway at The Triffid, Brisbane. 2022.

Title	Details
Farewell to the Fainthearted	Released: 22 October 2004; Label: Laughing Outlaw Records (LO/REV001); Producer: Wayne Connolly & Halfway; Engineer & Mixing: Wayne Connolly; Format: CD, Digital download, Streaming
Remember the River	Released: September 2006; Label: Laughing Outlaw Records; Producer: Rob Younger & Wayne Connolly; Engineer & Mixing: Wayne Connolly; Format: CD, Digital download, Streaming
An Outpost of Promise	Released: 29 May 2010; Label: Plus One Records (P1-29); Producer: Robert Forster; Engineer & Mixing: Wayne Connolly; Format: Vinyl LP, CD, Digital download, Streaming
Any Old Love	Released: 7 February 2014; Label: Plus One Records (P1-50); Producer: Robert Forster; Engineer & Mixing: Phil Graham; Format: Vinyl LP, CD, Digital download, Streaming
The Golden Halfway Record	Released: 8 April 2016; Label: Plus One Records, ABC Music (P1-65); Producer: Mark Nevers; Engineer & Mixing: Mark Nevers; Format: Vinyl LP, CD, Digital download, Streaming
Rain Lover	Released: 10 August 2018; Label: Plus One Records, ABC Music (P1-70); Producer: Mark Nevers & Halfway; Engineer: Yanto Browning; Mixing: Mark Nevers; Format: Vinyl LP, CD, Digital download, Streaming
Restless Dream	Released: 27 August 2021; Label: Plus One Records, ABC Music (P1-71); Producer: John Willsteed; Engineer: Yanto Browning; Mixing: Mark Nevers; Format: Vinyl LP, CD, Digital download, Streaming
On the Ghostline, with Hands of Lightning	Released: 26 August 2022; Label: Plus One Records, ABC Music (P1-72); Producer: Malcolm Burn; Engineer: Yanto Browning; Mixing: Malcolm Burn; Format: Double Vinyl LP, CD, Digital download, Streaming
The Styx	Released: 4 July 2025; Label: Plus One Records, (P1-78); Producer: Halfway & Mark Nevers; Engineer: John Busby & Ben Johnson; Mixing: Mark Nevers & John Busby; Format: Vinyl LP, CD, Digital download, Streaming

=== Live albums ===
Title	Details
Live At The Triffid	Released: 17 March 2017; Label: Plus One Records (P1-67); Format: CD, Digital download, streaming

=== Compilation albums ===
Title	Details
A Band Called Halfway	Released: 2015 (US only); Label: Plus One Records; Format: Digital download, streaming

== Awards and nominations ==
=== ARIA Awards ===
The Australian Recording Industry Association Music Awards is an annual series of awards celebrating the Australian music industry.

Year	Nominee / work	Award	Result
2021	Restless Dream	Best World Music Album	Nominated

=== APRA Awards ===
The APRA music awards in Australia are an annual awards ceremony celebrating excellence in contemporary music.

Year	Nominee / work	Award	Result
2015	Dulcify	Best Blues & Roots Work of the Year	Nominated

=== AIR Awards ===
The Australian Independent Record Awards (commonly known informally as AIR Awards) is an annual awards night to recognise, promote and celebrate the success of Australia's Independent Music sector.

Year	Nominee / work	Award	Result
2011	An Outpost Of Promise	Best Independent Country Album	Nominated
2014	Any Old Love	Best Independent Country Album	Won
2017	The Golden Halfway Record	Best Independent Country Album	Nominated
2018	Live at the Triffid	Best Independent Country Album	Nominated
2019	Rain Lover	Best Independent Country Album	Nominated

=== Grant McLennan Memorial Fellowship ===
The Grant McLennan Fellowship is a $25,000 award given to a Queensland contemporary music songwriter or songwriting duo with exceptional talent. Named in honour of Go-Betweens co-songwriter and front man, Grant McLennan. The prize money is used to travel to a choice of one of his three favourite cities, Berlin, London or New York, to further their song writing craft and experience by travelling overseas.

Year	Nominee / work	Award	Result
2007	John Busby & Chris Dale	GMMF	Nominated
2008	John Busby & Chris Dale	GMMF	Won

=== Queensland Music Awards ===
The Queensland Music Awards (previously known as Q Song Awards) are annual awards celebrating Queensland, Australia's brightest emerging artists and established legends. They commenced in 2006. The winner of the 'Song of the Year' award receives a bronze plaque on the Fortitude Valley Mall / Musical Walk of Fame in Brisbane.

Year	Nominee / work	Award	Result
2015	"Dulcify"	Song of the Year	Won
2015	"Dulcify"	Country Song of the Year	Won
2017	"Three in and There's Nothing But the Stars"	Country Song of the Year	Won

=== The Triffid - Queensland Album of the Year ===
The Triffid - Queensland Album of the Year is an annual award that is presented to a Queensland band or musical act for the best album of the year. The winner is selected from five nominees and they the spine of their album art painted on the 'Triffid Wall'.

Year	Nominee / work	Award	Result
2016	Halfway - The Golden Halfway Record	Qld Album of the Year	Won
