= Favre (disambiguation) =

Favre is a surname.

Favre may also refer to:

- Favre Bjerg, a mountain in Greenland
- Favre Lake, Nevada
- A. Favre & Fils, watch manufacturer

== See also ==
- Favre–Racouchot syndrome
- Fabre (disambiguation)
