= Sirens (Woodlock EP) =

EP by Woodlock
- Released: 18 September 2015
- Studio: The Grove Studios; In House Sound
- Genre: Indie; folk pop
- Length: 21:14
- Producer: Andy Mak; Wayne Connolly

Woodlock chronology
Labour of Love (2014)	Sirens (2015)

Singles from Sirens
- 1. "Sirens" Released: 21 August 2015

Sirens is the third independent EP by Melbourne acoustic folk band Woodlock.

The album was recorded in 2015 with producer Andy Mak, and supported by a national tour, as well as four festival appearances.

The album charted on the ARIA Independent Charts, while the title track also charted on the ARIA Singles Charts.

Woodlock has described the title track as a 'coming of age' song. "It’s almost a baptism from being the teenagers busking the streets, to the adults who really believe they have something to offer the world. Overall its about standing firm for what you believe, and not swaying on it."

== Track listing ==
All tracks are written by Eze and Zech Walters

Sirens
No.	Title	Length
1.	"Sirens"	3:54
2.	"Build a Kingdom"	4:37
3.	"Enemy"	3:54
4.	"Forever Ago"	4:42
5.	"Fortress"	4:07
Total length:		21:14

== Personnel ==
=== Woodlock ===
- Eze Walters – vocals, acoustic guitar, electric guitar, organ, wurlitzer, production (on Eleanor)
- Zech Walters – background vocals, synth, piano, organ, acoustic guitar, electric guitar, bass, production (on Eleanor)
- Bowen Purcell – percussion, drums

=== Additional personnel ===
- Josh Telford - Mixing, additional recording
- Matthew Gray - Mastering (Matthew Gray Mastering)
- Andy Mak - Production, programming, synths, bass, percussion

== Charting singles ==
Single	Chart	Peak position
Sirens (2015)	ARIA Hitseekers	20
Sirens (2015)	Australian Independent Record Labels Association	8

== Release history ==
Region	Date	Label	Format	Catalogue #	Ref.
Australia	18 September 2015	Independent	CD, digital download	WL002	
United States	18 September 2015	Independent	CD, digital download	9324690119097	
