= Drive Through Charisma =

Studio album by The Fauves
- Released: 1993
- Genre: Indie rock
- Label: Polydor Records

The Fauves chronology
Drive Through Charisma (1993)	The Young Need Discipline (1994)

Drive Through Charisma is the 1993 debut album by the Australian rock band The Fauves, released on Polydor.

The original release of the album included a 22 track bonus disc, featuring early demos and some live songs. The bonus disc was accompanied by a separate booklet titled "22 Reasons Why A Band Shouldn't Put An Album Out In Its First Few Years." The booklet was written by the band and provided critical analysis for each track.

== Details ==
Guitarist Phil Leonard later said of the album, "I think we took a few too many dark alleys on Drive Through Charisma."

Cox said, "We stumped up $15K for our first album and somehow managed to stooge Polydor into signing us who were then stuck with us for another three releases. Rarely has such a modest sum produced so much quantity. At 65 minutes with 23 track bonus disc it was like a meal at Sizzler - lots of it, but stay away from the salad bar. Reviewers were unanimous in their opinion that the album was long." The album was recorded in a "mud-brick house in Daylesford", "with all the gear set up in a caravan".

The album was fully recorded before the band signed with major label Polydor. Cox said, "I still never really understood why they signed us to begin with. That first record is a pretty challenging listen."

== Reception ==
Craig Mathieson said, "after two years of middling grunge dysfunctionalism, the Fauves are ready to take things a step further. Drive Through Charisma mixes hyper-kinetic Sonic Youth riff-play with the deep-seated obsessions of the group's two vocalist/songwriters: Physical corruption, social divergence, sexual deviancy, deception..."

== Track listing ==
1. Crashing Bore
2. Hitler Youth
3. Marble Arse
4. Puffinhead And Manta Ray
5. Orgasmosarion
6. She's A Hunter
7. Debauch Me
8. Diving Bell
9. Thin Body Thin Body
10. Bone Park
11. Self Immolator
12. Lightning Cabinet
13. Let Me Be your Toilet
14. Rising Blow
15. Arbuckle At Glenrowan

== Track listing ==
Bonus disc:

1. What About The Kiss?
2. Inland Sea
3. Blue September
4. Crumbling
5. Circumcision
6. A Moments Ornament
7. People Hater
8. In A Time of Plague
9. Vibrosonic
10. Out of Season
11. Italian Movies
12. Net Weight, One Pound
13. Reflecto Boy
14. The Man Who Never Sleeps
15. I Saw the Birth of Jesus
16. On A Trip to Sydney
17. The Rapids
18. On the World's Last Day
19. Cavalry Fought
20. Asylum
21. Fade Behind the Green
22. Runaway
