= Yves Klein Blue Draw Attention to Themselves =

EP by Yves Klein Blue
- Released: April 1, 2008
- Genre: Indie rock
- Label: Dew Process

Yves Klein Blue chronology
Yves Klein Blue Draw Attention to Themselves (2008)	Ragged & Ecstatic (2009)

Yves Klein Blue Draw Attention to Themselves is an EP by Yves Klein Blue released on 1 April 2008 on Dew Process. A demo of the same name was recorded by Matthew Whitehouse and the band themselves for sale at local shows, but was re-recorded and produced by Caleb James, a renowned Australian producer once the band signed to Dew Process. This subsequent re-release saw the band get picked up by Dew Process. The band's first single, Polka, received regular airplay on alternative radio station Triple J, and was followed by the release of their second single, Silence is Distance. Videos were shot for both of these singles, as well as for The Streetlight, which was left off the label re-release of the EP.

"Polka" also performed well in 2008 Triple J Hottest 100 voting, coming in at 76 in the overall list.

== Track listing ==
Self-released EP

1. "The Streetlight"
2. "Blasphemy"
3. "Fall Asleep"
4. "Silence is Distance"
5. "Polka"

Dew Process re-release

1. "Blasphemy"
2. "Not What I Want"
3. "19"
4. "Silence is Distance"
5. "Polka"
6. "(A Bookend)"

== Personnel ==
- Michael Tomlinson – lead vocals, rhythm guitar
- Charles Sale – lead guitar, keyboards, backing vocals
- Sean Cook – bass, backing vocals
- Chris Banham – drums, percussion
