= Sounds Like Sunset =

Australian band

Sounds Like Sunset are a band based in Sydney. The group formed in 1997 and as of 2019 have released 3 albums, Saturdays in 2001, Invisible in 2005 and We Could Leave Tonight in 2014 as well as various other releases on cassettes, 7-inch and compilations. We Could Leave Tonight was released on vinyl 22 July 2014 through Tym Records, and on CD and digitally on 22 August 2014 through Simon Tahiti Records.

== Early days ==
The band formed initially as a side-project with David Challinor (guitar), David Hobson (bass) and Rohan Geddes (drums) in a recently vacated room in Challinor's moldy and more or less condemned share house in Pennant Hills in Sydney's north west in August 1997. Challinor had been mostly busy playing guitar in the Sydney indie band Sal Paradise (Tooth & Nail Records) since early 1996, and Hobson had been playing bass in Sydney punk/hardcore act Ceasefire since around 1994. Early Sounds Like Sunset tape recordings and gigs showed the band in similar sonic territory as inspiring home-recording-band influences Flying Saucer Attack and other drone/noise/post-rock instrumental bands of the time - however this was something the band quickly distanced themselves from in the hope of melding all the noise & feedback into more concise, hummable melodic pop arrangements.

== Music ==
The band are often filed under shoegazer and noise-pop music. The group's influences and inspiration range from the Beatles, Beach Boys, The Kinks, Velvet Underground and Love, through to more recent artists You Am I, Dinosaur Jr, Sebadoh, Spacemen3, Stereolab, Bailter Space, Flying Saucer Attack, Sonic Youth, The Cure, My Bloody Valentine and the Jesus and Mary Chain.

The members' teenage/formative years share a collective love of punk & Death metal - which occasionally resurfaces, some might say at odds with the delicate melodic nature of the band's current output. Live shows are generally loud, densely layered and orchestrated guitar assaults.

== PRL ==
Until recently the band regularly fielded a team aptly named "The Söunds Like Sunset Singletönes" in the PRL (Pretend Rugby League) competition, formed during the early 2000s by Chief Robert F Cranny of numerous celebrated indie bands including Sarah Blasko, Gersey and 78 Saab. The PRL was formed from a number of the community of Sydney indie bands who rehearsed at the beloved and now defunct Troy Horse Studios in Alexandria. The team's PRL career began in 2003 during an alcohol-fuelled player auction event at the Zetland Hotel where the mostly ambivalent Challinor/Hobson auction representatives quickly exceeded the $100 salary cap and were outrageously docked competition points before a ball had even been kicked.

Its career highlight was coming Div 1 runners-up in the 2006 season, followed by a Div1 3rd place in the 2007 season with a team selected entirely by Travis Baird of cult Sydney indie instrumental band Founder. Baird was recruited to select a squad when everyone in Sounds Like Sunset once again forgot to attend the player auction.

In 2008 the band shocked the PRL community by again failing to attend the 2008 PRL player auction, a move that did not go unnoticed by the PRL hierarchy and the band were forced to relinquish their coveted spot in Div1 of the PRL altogether.

The band hope to be eligible to re-register with PRL in 2020 (after again forgetting to attend the 2019 player auction) and aim to start climbing their way back through the lower leagues until again finding PRL glory in Div1. As Phil Gould can often be quoted saying (though perhaps not in direct reference to the Singletönes) "dismiss them at your peril".

== Recent activity ==
Phil Usher (drums) joined the band in late 2018. Phil has an extensive background in music performance and composition, and currently teaches percussion full time in his hometown of Brisbane. Phil also writes, sings and plays guitar in Brisbane psych act Sacred Shrines, and played the same role in his previous band Grand Atlantic. Phil is also the current drummer for the legendary Brisbane act Screamfeeder. Phil has toured the US extensively in various bands since the mid-90s, and was even at one time called upon to play drums for Barry Manilow for a live stadium performance. Phil has been a dear friend of and enthusiastic advocate of Sounds Like Sunset for many years since watching the band's first ever live performance in 1997, and has arranged numerous Brisbane shows for the band as well as regularly providing booze, smokes, general good vibes and a floor for the routinely intoxicated and/or hungover band to sleep on.

Tobey Doctor (drums) has played in various jazz, punk and defiantly "unlistenable" DIY sludge bands since the late 80s and early 90s. Tobey initially befriended the band when booking SLS for shows at The Phoenix Club, a small underground venue in Darlinghurst before joining Sounds Like Sunset after Vig kind of went missing after a while in the early 2000s. Tobey is arguably the most well known drummer of Sounds Like Sunset, and appeared on the band's second album Invisible and third album We Could Leave Tonight. Tobey provided the loose, wild, energetic Keith-Moon-like wildcard element both on and off the field for what was probably the most cohesive and well-known SLS lineup of Challinor/Hobson/Fevre/Doctor, and continues to be a dear friend and collaborator even years after his departure. Originally from Manly, Tobey made a sudden decision to move from Bondi Beach to the Melbourne suburb of Heidelberg in late 2016, and after spending a short time away from music and adjusting to life in a new city, he has recently been jamming with a number of Melbourne indie bands including the prolific artist/indie music mover & shaker JMS Harrison.

Joseph Dews (drums) has played in a number of Sydney indie acts over the years including Founder, MachineMachine and The Woods Themselves, as well as his own ongoing solo projects. He currently plays guitar and sings in the band Peter Fonda, which also features current SLS member Travis Baird.

Andrew Fevre (guitar; 1997–2008) left Sydney and spent a year traveling Europe before returning to Sydney and moving in with Tobey Doctor in Bondi Beach. Despite living with Tobey, he only rejoined SLS for a very short time before mostly abandoning music altogether and becoming a chef within the empire of celebrity chef Bill Granger. Andrew remains a dear friend of SLS. He is one of the first childhood friends of David Hobson, and taught Hobson his first ever swear words. During Fevre's European absence the band played on with various friends dropping into the lineup for a number of shows, including:

- Scott Meikle (guitar) of Ben Aylward's post-Swirl band Beautiful World
- Pete Farley (guitar) of the bands Gelbison and Toni Collette & The Finish, and
- Travis Baird (guitar, keys) of the bands Founder, Melodie Nelson, El Mopa and The Woods Themselves, as well his ongoing solo project AFXJM which includes Patrick Matthews of Community Radio, Youth Group and (ex of) The Vines.

Current band members now live in an area spread as far afield as Tempe, Collaroy Plateau, Concord (Sydney), Paddington (Brisbane) and the NSW Central Coast suburb of Wyoming.

Vocalist and guitarist Dave Challinor died on 28 January 2023.

== Band members ==
Current lineup (current as of March 2019)

- David Challinor - vocals, guitar (died 28 January 2023)
- David Hobson - bass
- Ben White - guitar
- Travis Baird - guitar
- Phil Usher - drums

Past Members

- Joe Dews - drums
- Tobey Doctor - drums (Invisible, We Could Leave Tonight)
- Pete Farley - guitar
- Scott Meikle - guitar
- Andrew Fevre - guitar
- Matt Bonson - drums (Saturdays)
- David "Vig" Virgilio - drums
- Josh Thompson - guitar
- Rohan Geddes - drums

Recording & Mixing Engineers

- Wayne Connolly (Saturdays, We Could Leave Tonight)
- Anthony The (Invisible)
- Jon Gardner a.k.a. Jonboyrock (Invisible)
- Chris Townend (Saturdays)

Sound Engineers

- Toby Baldwin (early/mid 2000s-present)
- Al Cousins (early-mid 2000s-present)
- Anthony The (early-mid 2000s)
- Jon Gardner a.k.a. Jonboyrock (late 1990s-mid 2000s)
- Clay Segelov (early-mid 2000s)
- Dave Springer (early 2000s)
- Pete Kelly (late 1990s)
- Jorden Brebach (late 1990s)

It can also be a curious fact that as of March 2019 none of the 7 Sounds Like Sunset drummers past or present have any biological children between them.

== Discography ==
- We Could Leave Tonight LP 2014 Tym records
- Invisible LP 2005 Architecture Label
- Saturdays LP 2001 (Modular Recordings)
- Before it Blows/Promise Ring split 7-inch 2000 (Quietly Suburban Recordings) - a split release with Los Angeles indie band The Lassie Foundation
