= Nervous Flashlights =

Studio album by The Fauves
- Released: 12 June 2006
- Studios: Backbeach Recorders, St Andrews Beach; Velvet Sound, Sydney; Prolific Music, South Melbourne
- Genre: Indie rock
- Length: 49:03
- Label: Shock
- Producers: Wayne Connolly; the Fauves

The Fauves chronology
The Fauves (2004)	Nervous Flashlights (2006)	When Good Times Go Good (2008)

Nervous Flashlights is the eighth studio album by Australian indie rockers The Fauves, which was issued in June 2006 on Shock Records and was co-produced by the group with Wayne Connolly (You Am I). Eleven of its twelve tracks were written by the band's vocalist and guitarist, Andrew Cox.

== Details ==
Cox later said, "We got a grant for this one. Like lottery winners passing a bedraggled busker, the government leant in to the guitar case at my feet and generously deposited a few notes. Quailing with panic, taxpayers reached for their rear pockets only to find their wallets already gone."

On their website they related, "The song 'Clive of India Curry Powder' earned us our first ever sponsorship deal when the makers of the iconic spice blend sent us a box of their products as acknowledgment of the brilliant job we had done in promoting their brand."

== Reception ==
Garrett Bithell of FasterLouder opined, "nothing particularly memorable about [the album]. Musically the tracks are formulaic and generally uninspiring, but lyrically they are witty and literate. The problem is the guys are attempting to tread that very fine line between self-effacing tripe and culturally critical self-indulgence. In doing so they unfortunately fall into a well of gimmicky mediocrity."

The Sydney Morning Herald's George Palathingal observed, "The opening couplets of new album Nervous Flashlights could make you laugh out loud ('True love waits/So hit the brakes/Take your hands/Out of my pants ..."') while plaintive 'Down All Day' is just delicately lovely. Elsewhere, Cox references everyone from Jim Fixx, the so-called godfather of American jogging who died of a heart attack while running, to David Coverdale, singer for '80s hair-rock embarrassment Whitesnake."

The reviewer for Glovebox.com.au website rated it at 61% and explained, "As veteran mock-rockers, the [band] have left it until late in their career to discover their sensitive side, with [this album] being easily their most emotionally fragile release to date... It seems that at the heart of the Fauves is a sense of romanticism that was less apparent in their earlier works, but has become more pronounced as age has not wearied them but tempered their attitudes towards life."

== Track listing ==
All tracks are written by Andrew Cox, unless otherwise noted

No.	Title	Length
1.	"True Love Waits"	3:57
2.	"I'll Work When I'm Dead"	3:33
3.	"I'm Jim Fixx and I'm Dead Now"	4:27
4.	"Down all Day"	3:28
5.	"I Am not Approachable"	3:27
6.	"Trouble" (Philip Leonard)	3:21
7.	"Actress and Bishop/David Coverdale"	7:05
8.	"Something Spooked the Horses"	4:12
9.	"The Lost Art of Shorthand"	3:06
10.	"Clive of India Curry Powder"	3:38
11.	"Australian Gigolo"	4:12
12.	"We Sleep in the Afternoon"	4:36

== Personnel ==
The Fauves

- Timothy Cleaver – bass guitar, vocals
- Andrew Cox – guitar, vocals
- Philip Leonard – guitar, vocals
- Adam Newey – drums, vocals

Recording details

- Producer – Wayne Connolly, the Fauves
- Mastering – John Roberto
- Recording, mixing – Wayne Connolly
- Cover design – Michael Ebbels
