= Woodlock =

Australian band

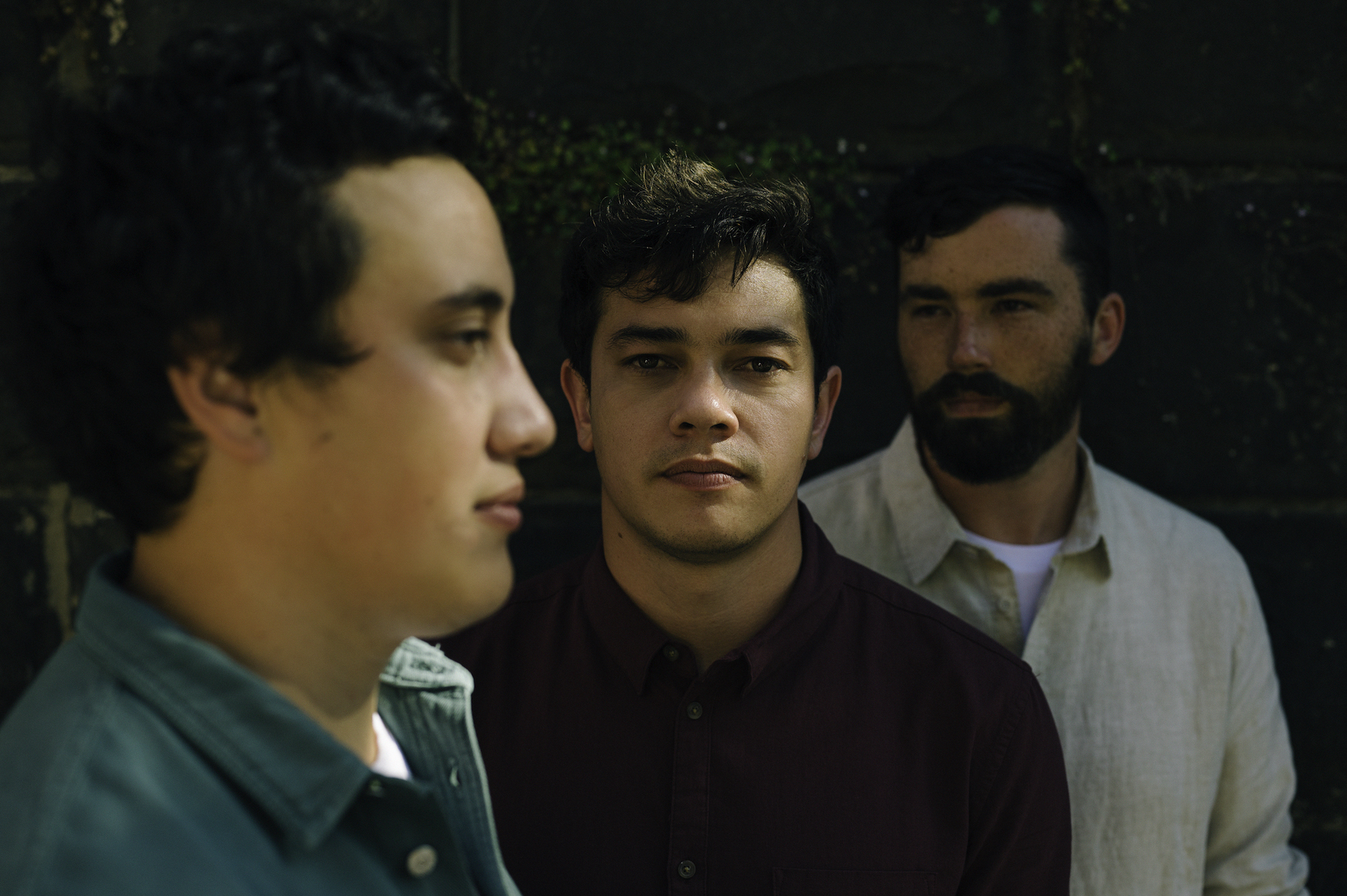
- Woodlock (from left, Eze Walters, Zech Walters, Bowen Purcell)

Background information
- Origin: Yarrawonga, Victoria
- Genres: Pop music; Indie pop; Acoustic; Alternative; Folk
- Years active: 2012–present
- Label: Nettwerk
- Members: Zechariah Walters; Ezekiel Walters; Bowen Purcell
- Website: www.woodlock.com.au

Woodlock are a Melbourne-based Alt Pop/folk band who gained popularity by busking the streets of rural and capital cities. New Zealand-born brothers Zech Walters (guitar/vocals) and Eze Walters (guitar/vocals) struck up a friendship with Bowen Purcell (drums) after moving to Australia. In search of adventure, the three travelled around the country busking, before eventually settling in Melbourne. Now signed to Nettwerk, the group have released three independent EPs and an album, The Future of an End.

== History ==
While travelling overseas, New Zealand brothers Zech and Eze Walters met Australian-born Bowen Purcell. After relocating to Purcell's home of Australia, Woodlock was born. Following the formation of the band, the trio spent several private sessions writing songs and rehearsing, before planning to visit several towns and cities to busk. The three purchased a caravan, painted it and began traveling up and down the east coast of Australia to perform their music on the streets. They captivated crowds with their "energetic" and "creative" performances, the band found themselves in Airlock Studios in early 2014 to record their first EP: Lemons. This release featured five original songs and was produced by Australian producer/engineer Wayne Connolly. Follow the independent release of their first EP, the band received media attention, and soon made appearances on BalconyTV and Triple J.

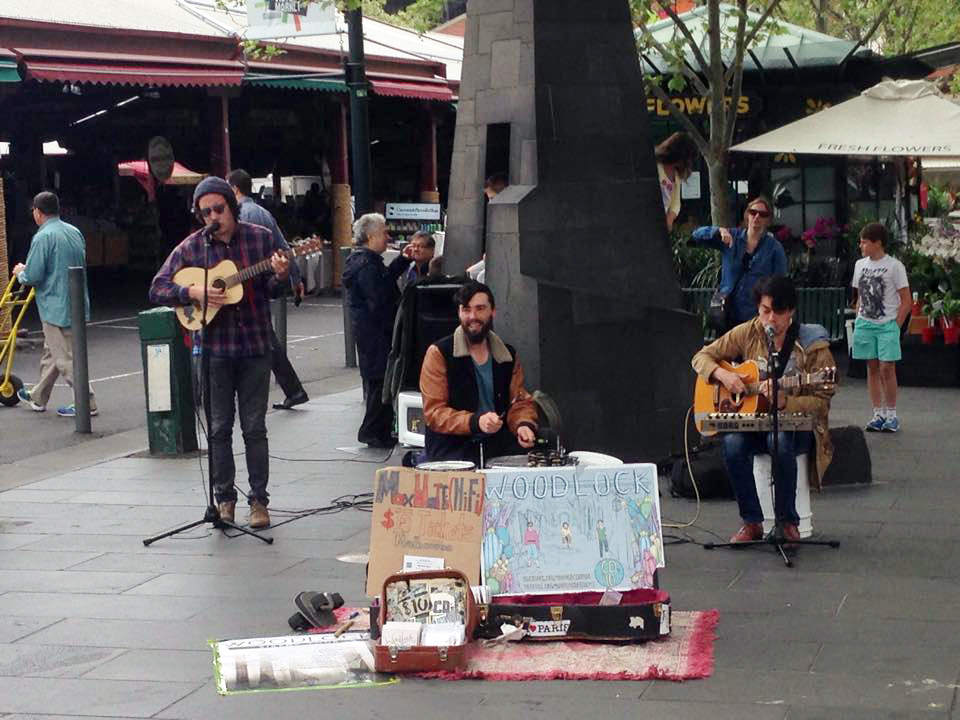
Woodlock performing live at Queen Victoria Market (September 2015)

Woodlock became regular buskers in the CBD of Melbourne, appearing largely in Bourke Street. In early 2014, the band returned to the studio with Connolly to record their second EP, Labour of Love. Their second CD featured seven original tracks, and charted on both iTunes and the ARIA Top 100 Charts. The trio continued to busk in the city, working their new material in with the old, and beginning to cover new songs to expand their repertoire. To celebrate selling over 25,000 EPs independently, the band launched a country wide tour, selling out shows in several locations, including Melbourne and Brisbane.

2015 saw the band tour the East Coast as a support act for The Pierce Brothers as well as busking between shows. It was announced via social media on 17 June that the band had returned to the studio with Andy Mak to begin work on their third EP. In August, Woodlock announced their new EP Sirens and released the title track of the same name as a single. Along with this release, the band announced a country-wide Australian tour (with support at selected shows from fellow local bands) that would take place from October to December.

In June 2016, the band announced that in the following month they would release a new single. Australian music website Tone Deaf premiered "The Only Ones" a day before its initial release, deeming it "a distinct move away from the acoustic folk that's been their bread-and-butter up to this point, bringing instead a more electronic influence of pop synths, thumping drums and melancholy atmospherics". The song was released on iTunes on July 15, coupled with the announcement of 'The Only Ones Tour' that consisted of three dates in Brisbane, Sydney and Melbourne.

== Discography ==
=== Albums ===
| Title | Album details |
|---|---|
| The Future of An End | Released: 26 February 2021; Label: Nettwerk Records; Format: CD, vinyl, digital download |

=== Extended plays ===
| Title | Album details | Peak chart positions |
| Title | Album details | ARIA Top 100 |
|---|---|---|
| Lemons | Released: 23 March 2013; Label: Independent; Format: CD, digital download | — |
| Labour of Love | Released: 16 May 2014; Label: Independent; Format: CD, digital download | 97 |
| Sirens | Released: 18 September 2015; Label: Independent; Format: CD, digital download | — |
| I Loved You Then | Released: 8 October 2021; Label: Woodstock; Format: digital download, streaming | — |
"—" denotes a recording that did not chart or was not released in that territory.

=== Singles ===
| Year | Title | Album |
|---|---|---|
| 2014 | My Throne | Labour of Love |
| 2015 | Sirens | Sirens |
| 2016 | The Only Ones | TBA |
| 2016 | Last Train to Clarkesville | TBA |
| 2016 | Something Broke That Day | TBA |
| 2021 | "I Loved You Then" | I Loved You Then |
