= Labour of Love (Woodlock EP) =

EP by Woodlock
- Released: 16 May 2014
- Studios: Albert Studios, Sydney
- Genres: Indie, folk pop
- Length: 29:45
- Producers: Wayne Connolly; Zech Walters and Eze Walters

Woodlock chronology
Lemons (2013)	Labour of Love (2014)	Sirens (2015)

Singles from Labour of Love
- 1. "My Throne" Released: 17 April 2014

Labour of Love is the second independent EP by Melbourne acoustic folk band Woodlock.

Described as their 'sophomore' album, Labour of Love was recorded in early 2014 when the band paused their busking career to head to Albert Studios in Sydney to meet with producer Wayne Connolly.

The album was released by digital download through iTunes as well as in physical copies sold at performances, and later from the website. The album gained positive reviews, and charted on the ARIA Charts (a first for the band).

== Track listing ==
All tracks are written by Eze and Zech Walters.

Labour of Love EP
No.	Title	Length
1.	"What You've Got"	4:41
2.	"Baby Girl"	3:48
3.	"Run"	4:12
4.	"The Garden"	3:30
5.	"My Throne"	4:21
6.	"The Fallout"	3:22
7.	"Eleanor"	5:51
Total length:		29:45

== Personnel ==
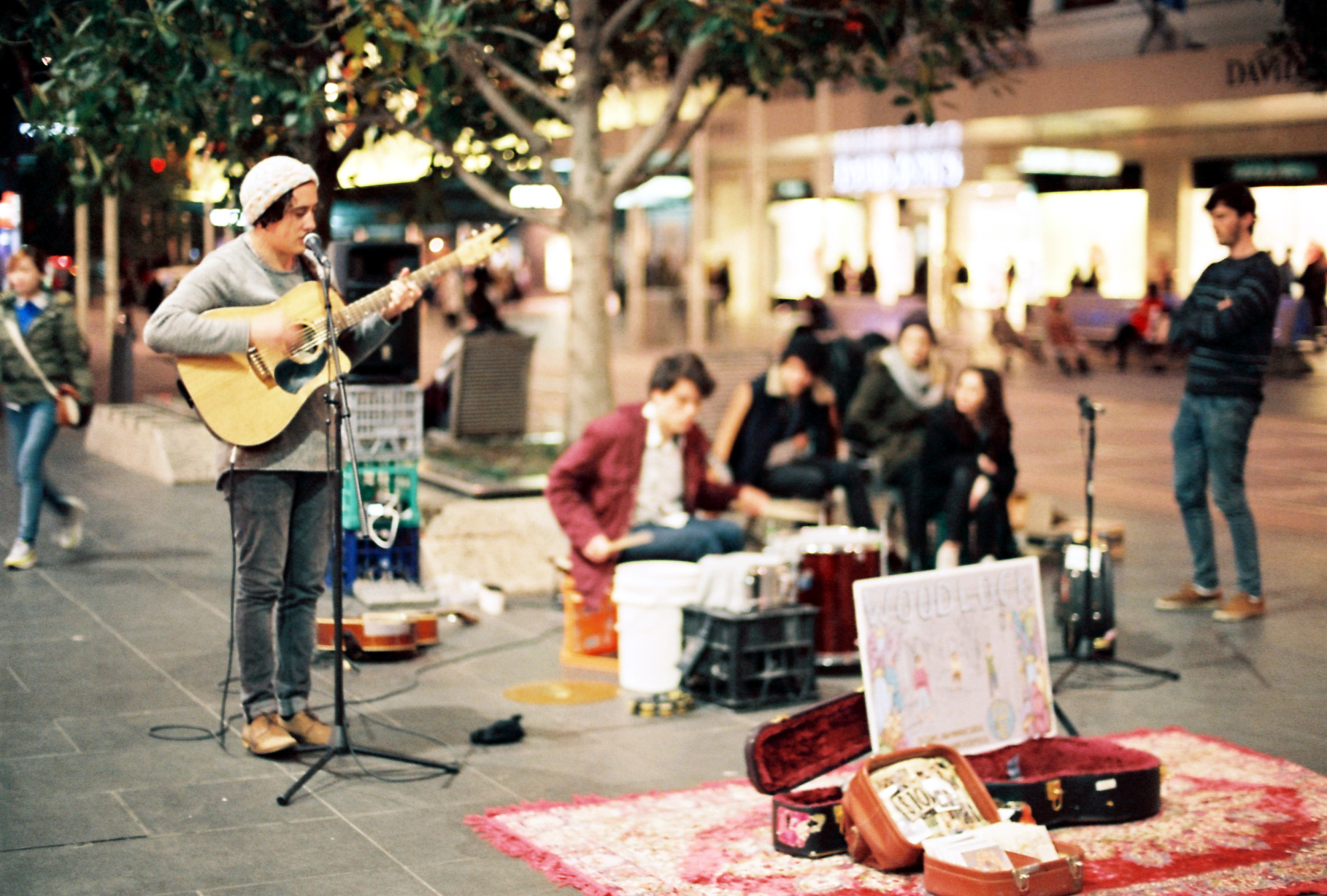
Eze Walters busking live with Woodlock in 2014.

Adapted from the EP liner notes.

=== Woodlock ===
- Eze Walters – vocals, acoustic guitar, electric guitar, organ, wurlitzer, production (on Eleanor)
- Zech Walters – background vocals, synth, piano, organ, acoustic guitar, electric guitar, bass, production (on Eleanor)
- Bowen Purcell – percussion, drums

=== Additional musicians ===
- Wayne Connolly – production, electric guitar, peppercorn shaker
- Jai Ingram – bass guitar
- Angus Gomm – trumpet

== Charts ==
Chart (2014)	Peak position
ARIA Top 100	97

== Release history ==
Region	Date	Label	Format	Catalogue #	Ref.
Australia	16 May 2014	Independent	CD, digital download	WL001	
