= Thousand Yard Stare (album) =

Studio album by The Fauves
- Released: 2000
- Genre: Indie rock
- Length: 43:00
- Label: Shock Records
- Producer: The Fauves

The Fauves chronology
Lazy Highways (1998)	Thousand Yard Stare (2000)	Footage Missing (2002)

Professional ratings
Review scores
Source	Rating
The Daily Telegraph	4/5 stars
Herald Sun	3.5/5 stars
The Age	4/5 stars
The Courier-Mail	3/5 stars
Sunday Herald Sun	3.5/5 stars

Thousand Yard Stare is the fifth studio album by Mornington Peninsula, Melbourne indie band The Fauves.

The album marked the departure of founding bassist Andrew Dyer, who was replaced by longtime sound engineer Teddy Cleaver. It was also a return to the band's original label, the independent Shock Records, after being dumped by Polydor following a takeover of that label by Universal.

== Details ==
Melbourne's Herald Sun noted the album abandoned the two-guitars approach in favour of cheap synthesisers and broadened the band's rock base to encompass disco and eletro-funk. Singer/guitarist Andrew Cox said: "Our two records prior to this were very guitar-pop records and we weren't keen on making the same album again. Being fairly limited guitarists there was only so far in this direction we could progress. So the keyboard thing is just an interesting way for us to explore a few more sounds."

Cox told The Age that album was a collection of "happy songs". "I think it's just more of a pop album. Our last album (Lazy Highways) was possibly our most introspective album, quite a melancholy one, whereas I think this one is a bit more brasher and a little bit more upbeat, probably just more straight-out happy songs. We just felt pretty positive while we were making it and really happy with it as we were going along. I think it was the whole thing of doing it ourselves, without having people looking over our shoulder and telling us we had to have this and that on there, and constantly reinforcing that we had to sell 'x' number of units."

Of the recording, Cox said, "With Polydor having shredded us like the incriminating files of an outgoing government, we faced our straitened circumstances with barely a trembling lip. We cinched our belts to impossibly small dimensions, made sure our intestines stayed in place and recorded for about $20K."

"Celebrate the Failure" was one of the singles released from the album, with Cox saying he was frustrated that it was interpreted as a comment on the Sydney Olympics. "That was a song that we were really passionate about. The title refers to the failure of the referendum on the republic and also the failure of reconciliation. Rock music is meaning less and less as it goes along. It's all about marketing, songs that will go well next to a cola ad on TV." Later, Cox noted, "When we made Thousand Yard Stare we thought people would love it because we knew it was clearly our best record but people hated it even more."

== Track listing ==
All songs by The Fauves.

1. "Taking the Uni Student Out to the Country" — 2:56
2. "Medium Pacer" — 2:23
3. "Write What You Know" — 3:43
4. "Give Up Your Day Job" — 3:17
5. "Going For My Blue Belt" — 3:23
6. "First Day On the Run" — 3:05
7. "Between You and the Dance Troupe" — 4:04
8. "Celebrate the Failure" — 3:58
9. "White Collar Crime" — 2:45
10. "Valerie 3933" — 2:53
11. "Astronaut Talk" — 3:35
12. "Every TV Star Has a Dark Side" — 3:40
13. "Bigger Than Tina" (bonus track) — 3:16

== Personnel ==
- Andrew Cox — guitar, vocals
- Philip Leonard — guitar, vocals
- Adam Newey — drums, vocals
- Timothy Cleaver — bass, vocals
- Rebecca Barnard — background vocals ("Write What You Know", "First Day on the Run")

== Charts ==
Chart (2000)	Peak position
Australian Albums (ARIA Charts)	60
