= John Paul Fauves =

Costa Rican artist

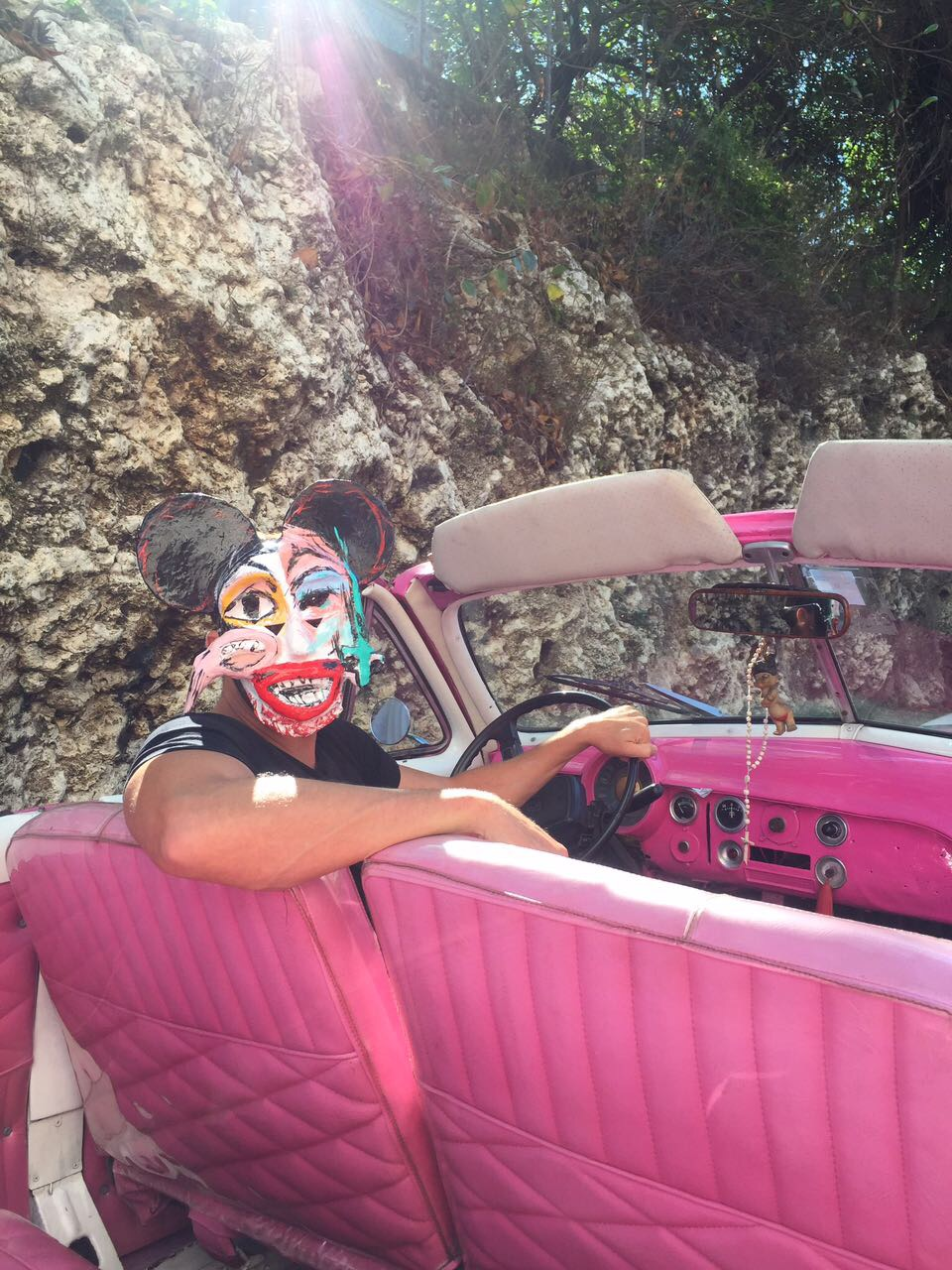
- "Portrait of the Artist"
- Born: Costa Rica
- Other names: Fauves
- Occupation: Visual artist Painter
- Website: www.johnpaulfauves.com

John "Paul" Fauves is a Costa Rican visual artist who lives and works in San José.

Fauves has exhibited his work in galleries in the United States and across Europe including Krause Gallery in New York City, Guy Hepner gallery in New York City, Imitate Modern in London, and the Meir gallery in Belgium. His paintings have also been featured in Vogue Italia and Dansk.

== Education and early life ==
Fauves began painting at an early age as a student under the instruction of the influential modern artist Joaquin Rodriguez del Paso. In 2017, after a hiatus from the arts to train in business, he began exhibiting internationally.

== Artistic style ==
In his paintings, Fauves engages questions of identity as they relate to art history, as well as our everyday interactions with mainstream culture and social media. Greatly inspired by modernist masters as well as pop-artists, Fauves mixes fragments of different iconic images in vivid and colorful compositions. Fauves' paintings take on a disorienting effect due to his technique of layering, cutting out, and collaging elements of pop-cultural images to a point where they become, not unrecognizable, but perversions of the familiar that ask the viewer to question what they think they know.

== Notable exhibitions ==
=== Selected solo exhibitions ===
- 2019: Alts Iz Farloyrn pop up exhibition in Los Angeles, CA, curated by JM Art Management
- 2018: MI ME at DOPENESS ART LAB in Taipei, Taiwan;
- 2018: w22 Galeria in San José;
- 2017: A Loss of Innocence and The Mickey Me Collection (2017) curated by The Tax Collection at Guy Hepner gallery, New York City;
- 2017: A Loss of Innocence at Meir Gallery, Belgium

=== Selected group exhibitions ===
- 2019: Portraits of Someone duet show with Vera Kochubey at Rhodes Contemporary, London, curated by The Tax Collection;
- 2019: Artists are the New Athletes at The Edit Gallery, Limassol
- 2018: Arte de La Peer at Kimpton La Peer Hotel, curated by JM Art Management;
- 2018: Down the Rabbit Hole at Imitate London
- 2018: Papi Chulo show curated By Myartisreal group exhibition at the Krause Gallery in New York City;
- 2017: participated in FACES, a group show at HOMME gallery Los Angeles curated by JM Art Management.

In 2018, he participated in Scope Basel, ARCO Madrid, Art Basel and Art Palm Beach in Miami.

New body of work 'WE ARE ALL ENCAGED' was released at SCOPE Art Show New York 2019 together with Imitate Modern gallery.

== Other projects ==
In 2017, Fauves, together with Popovy Sisters, did art installation at Style Fashion week in Pacific Design Center, curated by JM Art Management.
