= The Young Need Discipline =

Studio album by The Fauves
- Released: 1994
- Genre: Indie rock
- Label: Polydor Records

The Fauves chronology
Drive Through Charisma (1993)	The Young Need Discipline (1994)	Future Spa (1996)

The Young Need Discipline is the second studio album by Mornington Peninsula, Melbourne indie band The Fauves.

== Details ==
Sales of the album were hampered by a single not being released until five months after the album's release. Cox later said, "There's a long catalogue of really dumb things that have happened in our career but there's not really an excuse for it because we were on a major label."

== Track listing ==
(all songs by The Fauves)

1. "The Driver Is You"
2. "Dwarf On Dwarf"
3. "Cheroot"
4. "White Boy Needs It"
5. "Caesar's Surrender"
6. "Hey It's Only My Virile Suit"
7. "Man Lessons"
8. "Glitter Us"
9. "Trevor"
10. "Killer Whale"
11. "Call Me True Believer"
12. "Herding Instinct"
13. "Dead Rubber"

== Personnel ==
- Andrew Cox - Guitar, vocals
- Philip Leonard - Guitar, vocals
- Adam Newey - Drums, vocals
- Jack - Bass, vocals
