= Future Spa (album) =

Studio album by The Fauves
- Released: August 1996
- Recorded: Sing Sing, Hothouse, Melbourne and Charing Cross, Sydney
- Genre: Indie rock
- Length: 60:45
- Label: Polydor Records
- Producers: Wayne Connolly, Greg Wales

The Fauves chronology
The Young Need Discipline (1994)	Future Spa (1996)	Lazy Highways (1998)

Future Spa is the third album by Australian rock band The Fauves. It was released in August 1996.

The album contained two songs that appeared in Triple J Hottest 100, 1996, "Dogs Are the Best People" at No.20 and "Self Abuser" at No.30. It was nominated for Best Alternative Album in the 1997 ARIA awards but lost to Spiderbait's Ivy and the Big Apples. In November 2008, The Age reported that the album had sold 15,000 copies, making it the best-selling Fauves album.

Cox noted, "There are so many things you can write about, yet rock tends to limit itself to a very narrow band of what's acceptable. This is just our attempt to broaden that a little. Even if the lyrics aren't great, at least they're different. None of us are claiming to be poets."

== Track listing ==
(All songs written by The Fauves)

1. "Big Brother Age" — 3:46
2. "Don't Get Death Threats Anymore" — 3:22
3. "Self Abuser" — 2:54
4. "Sentimental Motel Journey" — 3:33
5. "Dogs Are the Best People" — 2:49
6. "I Love the Fight Game" — 2:35
7. "Understanding Kyuss" — 2:53
8. "That's the Lifestyle" — 4:13
9. "Skateboard World Record" — 2:38
10. "Tying One On" — 2:55
11. "I Wrote You a Power Ballad" — 3:56
12. "Dragster For Christmas" — 2:50
13. "Suddenly Looked and Realised" — 2:48
14. "Tighter Than I Like" — 19:45*

*Song ends at minute 4:40. After 5 minutes of silence, begins the hidden track, "Everybody's Getting a Three Piece Together" (9:40 - 12:40), followed by a police interview of two band members regarding a marijuana arrest and caution (12:40 - 19:40).

== Personnel ==
- Phil Leonard — vocals, guitar
- Andrew Cox — vocals, guitar
- Andrew Dyer — bass, vocals
- Adam Newey — drums, vocals

=== Additional musicians ===
- Wayne Connolly — keyboards, guitar, mandolin, guitar, backing vocals
- Tim Cleaver — guitar ("I Love the Fight Game")
- Soultrain — guitar ("That's the Lifestyle")
- Louise Taylor — keyboards
