= Jim Salmon's Lament =

Studio album by Perry Keyes
- Released: 5 October 2018
- Studio: Hercules Studios, Sydney
- Label: EH Records
- Producer: Wayne Connolly

Jim Salmon's Lament is the fifth studio album by Australian artist Perry Keyes, released in October 2018. The album debuted at number 17 on the AIR charts and peaked at 11 the next week.

== Details ==
Keyes was initially inspired to write the album after the death of his father in 2015. He said, "It started off that way but moved into an exploration of fathers in those poor neighbourhoods." It ended up with the songs based on a family Keyes knew as child that lived in the James Cook housing commission flats in Waterloo in Sydney. "I thought I would write about the dad, because I was pissed off with narcissistic blokes where everything they do is fuelled by self-interest but every time it got to mentioning the kids I would start writing a song about them." The main characters are father, wife-beater, and drug-dealer Jim Salmon; nervous mother Jenny; drug-using son Jimmy, and daughter Iris. They first appeared in the song "Queen of Everyone's Heart" [I remember your dad in his blue railway shirt, his arm with a snake tattoo/And your mum on Botany Road with her lips real big and her face all black and blue] from Keyes' 2010 album, Johnny Ray's Downtown. The first song depicts Jenny and Jim meeting. Keyes said, "It's pretty linear. You say the term concept album and you immediately think of Rick Wakeman and Richard Burton doing the narration. It's something I like to do. It's probably a good discipline for me. I like to come up with an idea of a theme and then create the songs to fit in it. There's a bigger picture there you can jump into if you want."

Keyes said the title of the record was, "a metaphor. I got it from the idea of salmon fighting their way upstream to survive. The cliches of life being a struggle." The album was intended to have a "second part" that was not released, but Keyes said in 2023 that it was completed.

The song, "Girl In The Crystal Cylinder Hoodie" was inspired by an incident in the laundries in the flats at Waterloo. He said, "I went out one Sunday afternoon and there was a boy and a girl, probably no older than 14, shooting heroin against the wall of one of them and I’ve got a basket full of clothes. The girl looked up at me, I looked at them, we had that moment where I was about to say something, she looked up at me and said 'don’t worry, we’ll clean our mess up when we’re finished'.

"Man With The Coppertone Tan" makes reference to gangster Lenny McPherson and his contemporaries. Keyes said, "I used to go up to the Lansdowne Hotel after high school when I was about year 10. You could actually get into places under-age and they didn't really care and we'd all have a schooner each, me and my mates. There was a great jukebox there that had Elvis Costello's "(I Don't Want to Go to) Chelsea" and Buddy Holly's "Rave On" and I used to play it over and over again. At the bar would be Chris Flannery, Mr Rent-a-Kill. We didn't really grasp who he was until the publican explained we shouldn't be pissing him off by talking too loud or playing Elvis Costello too much."

After the "relatively muted" music on Keyes' previous album, Sunnyholt, Keyes wanted the new album to be more accessible. "You hear something on it that sounds a bit like Bob Dylan in the 60s, something like Dire Straits, something like XTC. The sort of music I loved when i was 17 or 18." he said. Some critics felt "Ballad Of A Drunk Man's Car" sounded like a Bruce Springsteen song, but Keyes said he was trying to write something that sounded like Pat Benatar.

The album cover was taken by English documentary photographer Nick Hedges.

== Track listing ==
All songs written by Perry Keyes.

1. "Let's Have A Smoke Outside"
2. "Surf 'n' Turf"
3. "Girl In The Crystal Cylinder Hoodie"
4. "Oh Jimmy"
5. "Hyde Park Hotel"
6. "Iris"
7. "Jim Salmon's Lament"
8. "Man With The Coppertone Tan"
9. "The Killer Jim Johnson"
10. "Ballad Of A Drunk Man's Car"
11. "Bluebird Of Unhappiness"

== Personnel ==
- Perry Keyes – Acoustic guitar & vocals
- Edmond Kairouz - Electric guitar right channel
- Matt Galvin - Electric guitar left channel
- John Gauci - Piano, Hammond & Wurlitzer
- Grant Shanahan - Bass, percussion & vocals
- Lloyd Gyi - Drums
