= The Fauves (album) =

Studio album by The Fauves
- Released: July 2004
- Genre: Indie rock
- Length: 33 minutes
- Label: Shock Records
- Producer: The Fauves

The Fauves chronology
Footage Missing (2002)	The Fauves (2004)	Nervous Flashlights (2008)

The Fauves is the seventh studio album by Mornington Peninsula, Melbourne indie band The Fauves.

The album is notable for its brevity and the fact that it only contains three songs by Phil Leonard ("The Doctor").

Cox said, "It came together relatively quickly. We wrote the songs over a period of a few months then learnt them really quickly and then recorded it really quickly. With this record we didn't want to over-think it. Our last couple of albums had more instrumentation on them with the keyboards but we've stripped this one back to guitar bass and drums. It's a much rawer record than the others."

== Track listing ==
All songs by The Fauves

1. "Smoking Again"
2. "Weak Chin"
3. "Slow Decline"
4. "Metrosexual"
5. "You Wanted It"
6. "On The Couch"
7. "Over The Line"
8. "Get F***ed"
9. "Jesus & Money"
10. "Big Summer For Me"
11. "Shouldn't Have Read Your Diary"

== Personnel ==
- Andrew Cox - Guitar, vocals
- Philip Leonard - Guitar, vocals
- Adam Newey - Drums, vocals
- Timothy Cleaver - Bass, vocals
