= Ragged & Ecstatic =

Studio album by Yves Klein Blue
- Released: 7 July 2009
- Studio: Airlock Studios, Brisbane, QLD; Fairfax Recordings, Hollywood, CA
- Genre: Indie rock
- Length: 42:52
- Label: Dew Process
- Producer: Kevin Augunas, Caleb James

Yves Klein Blue chronology
Yves Klein Blue Draw Attention to Themselves (2008)	Ragged & Ecstatic (2009)

Singles from Ragged & Ecstatic
- 1. "Getting Wise" Released: June 2008; 2. "Make Up Your Mind" Released: 5 October 2009

Ragged & Ecstatic is the debut and only studio album of Australian indie rock band Yves Klein Blue. It was released on 7 July 2009 by Dew Process. It was produced by Kevin Augunas and Caleb James, and recorded the album at Airlock Studios in Brisbane, and Fairfax Recordings in Hollywood. The debut single of the album, "Getting Wise", was included in the Triple J Hottest 100 of 2009 at No. 79.

== Promotion and singles ==
The first single of the album, "Getting Wise", was released in June 2008, its music video was not uploaded to YouTube. Their second and final single, "Make Up Your Mind", was released on 5 October 2009 alongside its accompanying music video. The track "Polka", originally released as a single for their debut EP, Yves Klein Blue Draw Attention to Themselves released in March 2008 alongside an accompanying music video, it was later included in this album. The track "Polka" appeared in a 2008 advertisement for the Mitsubishi Lancer Sportsback. To promote the album, Yves Blue Kein performed at the Big O Festival in Brisbane, Sydney, Melbourne, Newcastle, Canberra and Wollongong. In May, they also played at The Great Escape in Brighton. They later performed a national tour for the album in late-June and early-July.

== Critical reception ==
Professional ratings
Review scores
Source	Rating
The AU Review	7/10
Music Feeds	7/10
SputnikMusic	3.5/5 stars

The album received generally favourable reviews. Alexandra Duguid of The AU Review, in a 7/10 review, noted it wasn't much of an improvement since their debut EP. She then went on to say that the album was full of "light-hearted pop songs, laced with bouncy tempos and witty lyrics" and cited the track "Summer Sheets" as a personal favourite. Michael Carr from Music Feeds, in another 7/10 review, praised the album. However he stated that while the songs were good, the album as a whole could be forgettable. In a review from SputnikMusic, the album was described as "everyone will know their songs, but will have no idea who they are." In another review it was called "better than average debut, with pop-laiden guitar and a diverse range of influences." The single "Getting Wise" was nominated at No. 79 in the 2009 Triple J Hottest 100.

== Track listing ==
All tracks are written by Michael Tomlinson

Ragged & Ecstatic
No.	Title	Length
1.	"Make Up Your Mind"	2:33
2.	"Soldier"	3:05
3.	"Getting Wise"	4:11
4.	"Digital Love"	3:50
5.	"About the Future"	2:38
6.	"Celebrity Death"	4:32
7.	"Summer Sheets"	3:01
8.	"Polka"	4:11
9.	"Dinosaur"	3:35
10.	"Queeny"	4:01
11.	"Reprise"	2:55
12.	"Gin Sling"	4:20
Total length:		44:52

== Personnel ==
Credits adapted from AllMusic.

Yves Blue Klein

- Chris Banham – drums, percussion
- Sean Cook – bass guitar
- Charles Sale – lead guitar, keyboards
- Michael Tomlinson – lead vocals, rhythm guitar

Production

- Kevin Augunas - engineer, mixing, producer
- Wayne Connolly - mixing
- Scott Horscroft - mixing
- Caleb James - engineer, pre-production, producer
- Greg Koller - engineer
- John Mullen - A&R
- Paul Piticco - management
- Yanto Shortis - assistant engineer
- Steve Smart - mastering
- Joe Syring - assistant engineer
- Ken Taylor - artwork
