= The Fauves (band) =

Australian band

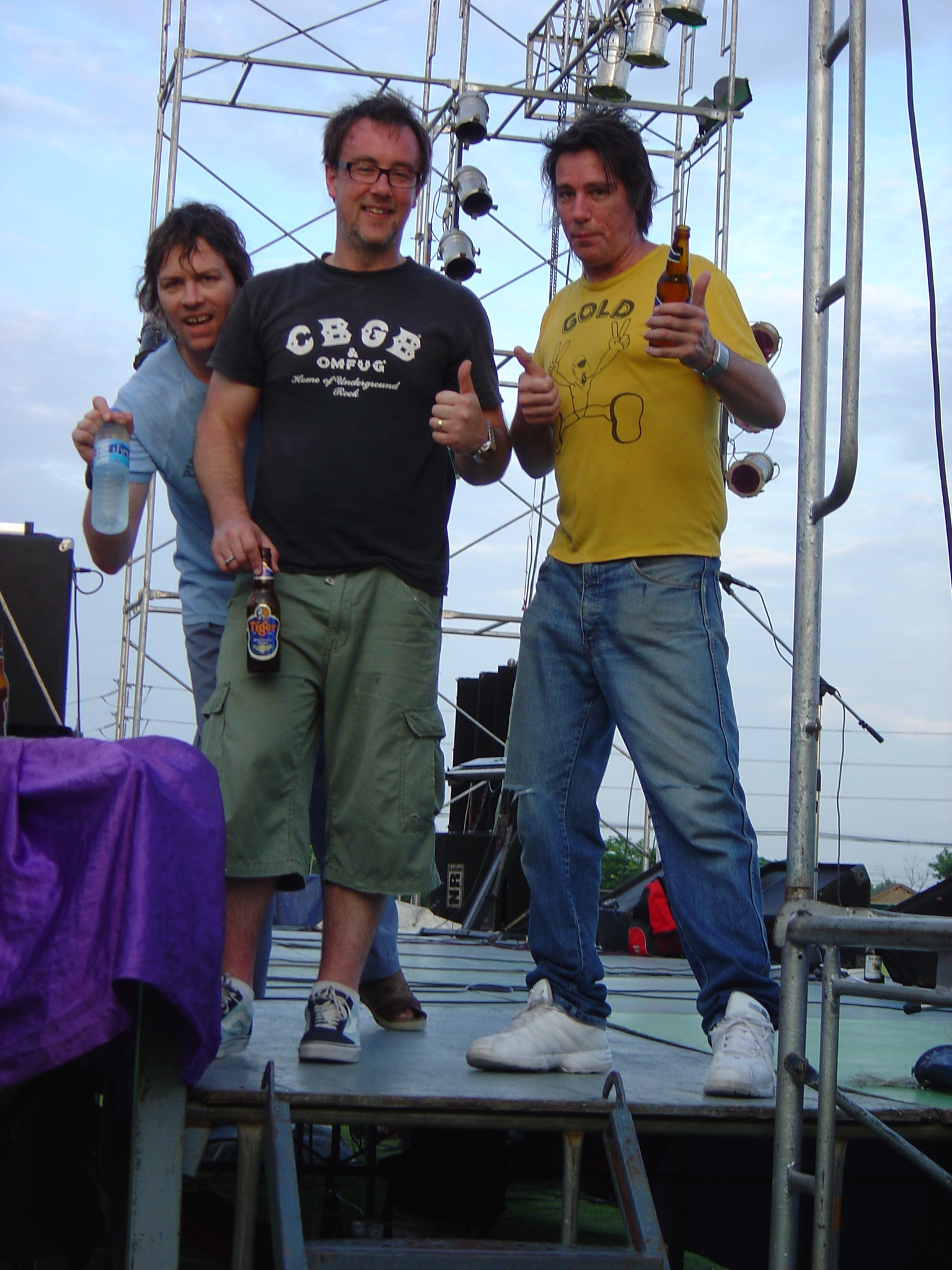
- The Fauves at the Asian Football Championships, July 2007

Background information
- Origin: Melbourne, Victoria, Australia
- Genre: Rock
- Years active: 1988–present
- Labels: Timbertop; Shock; Polydor; Festival
- Members: Andrew "Coxy" Cox; Philip "Doctor" Leonard; Adam "Doug" Newey; Timothy "Ted" Cleaver
- Past members: Andrew "Jack" Dyer
- Website: thefauves.com

The Fauves are an Australian rock band formed in 1988. The band are known for their witty lyrics, melodic pop-rock and often satirical or evocative exploration of Australian themes.

Their album Future Spa was nominated for Best Alternative Album in the 1997 ARIA awards but lost to Spiderbait's Ivy and the Big Apples. They played at the Big Day Out in both 1993 and 1997.

In 2007, they played their 1,000th Show and in 2008 they celebrated their 20th Anniversary Gig at The Espy in Melbourne.

== History ==
The Fauves were formed in 1988 by four students of Mt Eliza High School, Mornington Peninsula. They were Andrew Cox on guitar and vocals; Andrew "Jack" Dyer on bass guitar; Philip Leonard on guitar, vocals and brass; and Adam Newey on drums. According to Australian musicologist, Ian McFarlane, they "took their name from the short-lived French art movement, Fauvism, which was characterised by both its intensity and infatuation with colour." Neither Cox nor Leonard had formal music lessons.

Their first gig was on 23 July 1988, at a local football club, Cox later recalled "We learnt more about rock 'n' roll in that one night than the entire preceding 20 years. We sucked piss, made eyes at the cheap football tarts and bonded like four buckets of superglue. We also learnt how to compromise, how to sell out, and how to get fucked over. There was no rider, we were underpaid and no one got laid. It was a microcosm of an entire career." McFarlane declared that the group's "early sound was an energetic distillation of garage-punk rock riffs and surreal lyrics."

In March 1990, the band released their debut five-track extended play, This Mood Has Passed, on Timbertop Records. It had been recorded in the previous year at Timbertop Studios, Ringwood, with Peter Carrodus producing. McFarlane felt the EP "reflected the frantic, primal elements of early Hunters & Collectors or Moodists." They followed in October with a 7" single, "Fireman 451", on Shock Records, produced by Doug Saunders.

In 1991, they issued two singles, "When Luck Ran Out" and "Daughter Aboard". In the following year two EPs, both with six-tracks, were issued on Shock Records, The Scissors Within (April) and Tight White Ballhugger (September), each was produced by Robbie Rowlands. The EPs "kept up the experimental energy and humour." In 1992 the Fauves featured on a split CD, Dress Ups (Shock Records), with other Melbourne bands The Glory Box and Pray TV with each band performing a track from the others' repertoire, as well as contributing one original track.

Nic Haygarth of The Canberra Times caught their gig in October 1992, he found "the bald heads of [Dyer] and [Leonard] give them a fiercer appearance, but nothing could be friendlier than the melody of 'Fracture in the Sky' and Leonard's trumpet on their best track 'Wilding'. The Fauves played strong material from The Scissors Within and quirky new stuff from latest EP Tight White Ballhugger, including mandolin tempered 'Archimedes' Crown'. Doomy distorted guitars powered their set, but the Fauves nearly lost their audience with a couple of extended thrash routines which not even the Brady Bunch theme could redeem."

During a gig at Sydney's Annandale Hotel late in 1992 "they detoured into a freeform noise epic during which Cox washed Newey's hair with Vegemite and shampoo." The Age's Craig Mathieson described their support slot on the Church's national tour, "They rehearsed extensively, mindful of the opportunity they had been given. The result? Church fans ignored them."

The band came to wider attention when they appeared on the bill of the first Big Day Out tour in January 1993. They signed to Polydor Records and, in October of that year, they released their debut long player, Drive Through Charisma. It was produced by Rowlands, who had them "recorded in a mud-brick house in Daylesford." The original version included a 22-track bonus disc featuring early demos and some live songs, which Mathieson felt were "often horrendous early recordings." It was accompanied by a separate booklet, "22 Reasons Why a Band Shouldn't Put an Album Out in Its First Few Years", written by Newey who provided critical analysis for each track: Mathieson noticed he "ridiculed every song."

The 1994 computer game Quarantine featured the band's song "The Driver Is You" on its soundtrack. Their second album The Young Need Discipline was released in 1994. In 1995 the band released a non-album single "Everybody's Getting a 3 Piece Together". The song was later included on the band's next album as a secret track.

The Fauves's most successful album to date Future Spa was released in July 1996. The album yielded considerable radio success with singles "Dogs Are the Best People" and "Self Abuser" coming in at No. 20 and No. 30 respectively in the Triple J Hottest 100, 1996. Between the release of Future Spa and their album Lazy Highways, the band were filmed for Vanessa Stuart's one-hour documentary, The Fauves: 15 Minutes to Rock, which has since aired on SBS and was also screened at the Document Film Festival in October 2004.

The band toured heavily throughout the 90s and undertook support slots for overseas touring acts including Lush, Morphine, Ween, Weezer, Live, The Grifters, The Presidents of the United States of America, and Mr. Bungle.

By the end of 1999, however the band was dropped from Polydor after the label's merger with Universal. Following their departure from the major label, the band wrote two songs, "Bigger Than Tina" and "Bigger Than Tina II", for the Australian movie Bigger Than Tina which were released as a single on Festival. Since then the group has released seven albums independently. They had further success on the Triple J Hottest 100 with "Bigger Than Tina" at No. 50 in 1999, and "Give Up Your Day Job" at No. 58 in 2000.

Original bassist Andrew "Jack" Dyer was fired from the band in late 1999, playing his final show with the band on New Year's Eve at the Falls Festival. On 1st January 2000 the band's long-time soundman Timothy "Ted" Cleaver officially joined the band on bass and keyboards. This new lineup released a further four albums through Shock Records: Thousand Yard Stare (2000), Footage Missing (2002), The Fauves (2004) and Nervous Flashlights (2006).

The Fauves released their ninth studio album, When Good Times Go Good, on 6 September 2008. It was recorded with longtime collaborator Wayne Connolly, who has worked on five of the band's nine albums, and co-produced by Jim Moginie from Midnight Oil. A video-clip was made of the "Underwhelmed".

After a three-year break the band debuted tracks from their tenth album Japanese Engines on 10 November 2011 in Geelong. The album was followed only five months later by an eight-track EP German Engines launched at The Toff in Town. Andrew Cox announced on stage: "Japanese Engines was kind of the poppier record. German Engines has a much darker soul, it's a bit heavier, it's a bit rougher."

A double album, titled Driveway Heart Attack, was released in 2019, their 12th studio album.

In July 2022, the band headlined a Melbourne show. The press releases labeled it "last show till the next one", the "first show since the last one."

On 1 September 2023, the Fauves reissued their first two EPs as they were originally intended to be, a full-length album titled Faematronic.

The band released their 13th album, Tropical Strength, on 1 November 2024. They recorded the album in Indonesia and in the accompanying press, they explained: "Very few Australians have ever been to Bali so we relished the sense of outpost exoticism and a culture completely untouched by Western influence. Here we could work in relative anonymity, far from the complete anonymity that tracks our every move at home."

== Members ==
=== Current members ===
- Andrew "Coxy" Cox – vocals, guitar (1988–present)
- Phil "The Doctor" Leonard – vocals, guitar, keyboards (1988–present), trumpet (1988–1994)
- Adam "Doug" Newey – drums (1988–present)
- Terry "Ted" Cleaver – live mixing (1994–2000), bass (2000–present)

=== Former members ===
- Andrew "Jack" Dyer – bass (1988–1999)

== Discography ==
=== Albums ===
List of albums, with Australian chart positions
| Title | Album details | Peak chart positions |
| Title | Album details | AUS |
|---|---|---|
| Drive Through Charisma | Released: October 1993; Format: CD, 2×CD; Label: Polydor (519860 2) | — |
| The Young Need Discipline | Released: September 1994; Format: CD; Label: Polydor (523652 2) | — |
| Future Spa | Released: August 1996; Format: CD; Label: Polydor (533472 2) | — |
| Lazy Highways | Released: June 1998; Format: CD, 2×CD; Label: Polydor (557383 2) | 52 |
| Thousand Yard Stare | Released: October 2000; Format: CD; Label: The Hypnotized Label (HIP038) | 60 |
| Footage Missing | Released: July 2002; Format: CD; Label: Shock (SHOCK0400) | — |
| The Fauves | Released: July 2004; Format: CD; Label: Shock (SHOCK0401) | — |
| Nervous Flashlights | Released: July 2006; Format: CD; Label: Shock (SHOCK0402) | — |
| When Good Times Go Good | Released: 2008; Format: CD; Label: Shock (SHOCK0403) | — |
| Japanese Engines | Released: 2011; Format: CD; Label: Shock (SHOCK0404) | — |
| German Engines | Released: May 2012; Format: CD; Label: Shock (SHOCK0405) | — |
| Driveway Heart Attack | Released: June 2019; Format: 2×CD, 2×LP; Label: The Fauves (FAUVES001/FAUVES002) | — |
| Tropical Strength | Released: 1 November 2024; Format: CD, vinyl, digital; Label: Valve Records (V7177) | — |

=== Compilations ===
List of albums, with selected details
| Title | Details |
|---|---|
| Surf City Heart | Released: 2003 (Brazil only); Format: CD; Label: Tronador Music (TMSS09-2) |
| Prefer Others (B-Sides 1995-2002) | Released: June 2007; Format: CD; Label: The Fauves |
| Faematronic | Released: 1 September 2023; Format: Vinyl; Label: Cheersquad Records & Tapes |

=== Extended plays ===
List of EP, with selected details
| Title | Details |
|---|---|
| The Mood Has Passed | Released: 1989; Format: LP, Cassette, CD; Label: Timbertop (TT006) |
| The Scissors Within | Released: June 1992; Format: CD; Label: Shock (SHOCK CD 0019) |
| Tight White Ballhugger | Released: July 1992; Format: CD; Label: Shock (SHOCK CD 0020) |
| Dress Ups | Released: October 1992; Format: CD; Label: Shock (SHOCK CD 0023); with The Glory Box and Pray T.V. |
| Caesar's Surrender | Released: 1995; Format: CD; Label: Polydor (851 633-2) |

=== Singles ===
- "Fireman 451" – 7" vinyl only (October 1990)
- "When Luck Ran Out" (1991)
- "Daughter Aboard" (1991)
- "Misguided Modelling Career" (1992)
- "Thin Body Thin Body" – Polydor Records (September 1993)
- "Marble Arse" – Polydor Records (February 1994)
- "Dwarf on Dwarf" – Polydor Records (February 1995)
- "Caesar's Surrender" – Polydor Records (May 1995)
- "Everybody's Getting a 3 Piece Together" – Polydor Records (October 1995)
- "Dogs Are the Best People" – Polydor Records (June 1996)
- "Self Abuser" – Polydor Records (October 1996)
- "Don't Get Death Threats Anymore" – Polydor Records (February 1997)
- "Sunbury '97" – Polydor Records (November 1997)
- "Surf City Limits" – Polydor Records (May 1998)
- "Charles Atlas Way" – Polydor Records (July 1998)
- "Kickin' On" – Polydor Records (November 1998)
- "Bigger Than Tina" – Festival Records (October 1999)
- "Give Up Your Day Job" – Shock Records (June 2000)
- "Celebrate the Failure" – Shock Records (September 2000)
- "Medium Pacer" – Shock Records (November 2000)

==== Charting singles ====
List of singles, with selected chart positions
| Title | Year | Peak chart positions | Album |
| Title | Year | AUS | Album |
|---|---|---|---|
| "Surf City Limits" | 1998 | 97 | Lazy Highways |
| "Celebrate the Failure" | 2000 | 81 | Thousand Yard Stare |

== Awards and nominations ==
=== ARIA Awards ===
The ARIA Music Awards is an annual awards ceremony that recognises excellence, innovation, and achievement across all genres of Australian music. They commenced in 1987.

| Year | Nominee / work | Award | Result |
|---|---|---|---|
| 1997 | Future Spa | Best Adult Alternative Album | Nominated |
