= Lazy Highways =

Studio album by The Fauves
- Released: July 1998
- Genre: Indie rock
- Label: Polydor Records
- Producer: Wayne Connolly

The Fauves chronology
Future Spa (1996)	Lazy Highways (1998)	Thousand Yard Stare (2000)

Lazy Highways is the fourth studio album by Mornington Peninsula, Melbourne indie band The Fauves. The album has been described as the band's Australiana-album.

The sleeve artwork is very similar in design to the Miles Davis album Bitches Brew.

Cox later said, "When we made Lazy Highways we knew it wouldn't do as well as Future Spa because we weren't interested in making Future Spa mark 2. Lazy Highways had too many quiet moments for the average mosher in the front row and our popularity went down accordingly." Newey added, "We played Future Spa on the road for so long, we did like 140 shows after its release. We were just exhausted and that's largely responsible for the mellower tone on this record. We didn't feel like cranking it up and going crazy."

== Track listing ==
(all songs by The Fauves)

1. "Surf City Limits"
2. "Ocean Hearted"
3. "The Charles Atlas Way"
4. "Long Load"
5. "Girlfriend For Life"
6. "Campfire King Of Course
7. "Playing Like Millionaires"
8. "Wear The Label On The Outside"
9. "Kickin' On"
10. "The Greek Aesthetic"
11. "Extra Virgin"
12. "What's Five Cents Buy"
13. "Don't Give Me The It's Not You It's Me"
14. "Sunbury '97"
15. "Show You Round The Compound"

== Personnel ==
- Andrew Cox - Guitar, vocals
- Philip Leonard - Guitar, vocals
- Adam Newey - Drums, vocals
- Andrew 'Jack' Dyer - Bass, vocals

== Charts ==
Chart (1998)	Peak position
Australian Albums (ARIA Charts)	52
