= Yves Klein Blue =

Australian musical group

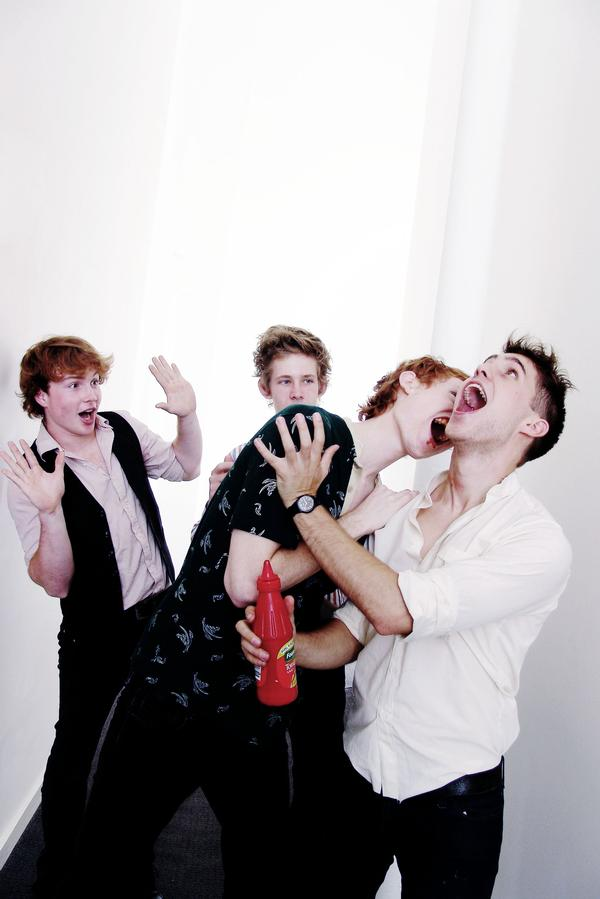
- Yves Klein Blue, 2007

Background information
- Origin: Brisbane, Queensland, Australia
- Genres: Indie rock
- Years active: 2005–2010
- Label: Dew Process
- Past members: Michael Tomlinson; Charles Sale; Sean Cook; Chris Banham

Yves Klein Blue was an Australian indie rock band from Brisbane, which formed in 2005 and disbanded in 2010. The line-up included Chris Banham on drums and percussion, Sean Cook on bass guitar, Charles Sale on lead guitar and keyboards and Michael Tomlinson on lead vocals and rhythm guitar. Their name is from the colour, International Klein Blue, by Yves Klein.

The band were signed to Brisbane record label Dew Process, under which they re-released their debut EP Yves Klein Blue Draw Attention to Themselves (April 2008).

Yves Klein Blue supported local and international acts, the Veils, Franz Ferdinand, the Fratellis, the Living End, Ben Kweller, You Am I and the Grates, and appeared at Big Day Out, SxSW, Pyramid Rock Festival and Splendour in the Grass during 2008. Their only album, Ragged & Ecstatic, was released in Australia and New Zealand in July 2009, which reached the top 50 on the ARIA Albums Chart.

On 31 January 2011, the band announced via an email to mailing list subscribers and a post on their Facebook page wall that they had disbanded in the second half of 2010 due to creative differences and that they now live in different cities.

== Afterwards ==
Charles Sale, on guitar and vocals, formed punk rockers, Babaganouj in Brisbane in 2011 alongside co-founding member Harriette Pilbeam (a.k.a. Hatchie, ex-Go Violets), on bass guitar and vocals; they added Ruby McGregor in 2013 on rhythm guitar and vocals. Their debut extended play, Sife Lucks (February 2014), was followed by three more EPs, Pillar of Light (August 2016), Hard to Be (October 2016) and Clarity Restored (2017), before working on their debut album.

In February 2013, Yves Klein Blue's lead singer, Michael Tomlinson, formed a new band, Many Things, based in London.

== Members ==
- Chris Banham – drums, percussion
- Sean Cook – bass
- Charles Sale – lead guitar, keyboards
- Michael Tomlinson – lead vocals, rhythm guitar

== Discography ==
=== Studio albums ===
Title	Details	Peak positions
Title	Details	AUS
Ragged & Ecstatic	Release date: July 2009; Label: Dew Process Records; Formats: CD, music download	42

=== Extended plays ===
Title	Details
Yves Klein Blue Draw Attention to Themselves	Release date: 1 April 2008; Label: Dew Process Records; Formats: CD, music download

=== Singles ===
Year	Single	Album
2008	"Polka"	Yves Klein Blue Draw; Attention to Themselves
2008	"Silence Is Distance"	Yves Klein Blue Draw; Attention to Themselves
2009	"Getting Wise"	Ragged & Ecstatic
2009	"Polka" (re-release)	Ragged & Ecstatic
2010	"Make Up Your Mind"	Ragged & Ecstatic

== Awards ==
- Yves Klein Blue's single "Polka" was named in 76th place in the Triple J Hottest 100, 2008.
- Yves Klein Blue's song "Getting Wise" was named in 79th place in the Triple J Hottest 100, 2009.
