= Fabre (disambiguation) =

Fabre is a French surname and a given name.

Fabre may also refer to:

- Musée Fabre, a museum in the French city of Montpellier
- Pierre Fabre Group, a pharmaceutical and cosmetics company
- Fabre (Montreal Metro), a stop on the Montreal Metro
- Fabre (electoral district), a Quebec provincial riding
- Saint-Édouard-de-Fabre, Quebec, usually shortened to Fabre
