= Hungry Kids of Hungary (EP) =

EP by Hungry Kids of Hungary
- Released: August 2008
- Studio: Airlock Studios in Brisbane
- Genre: Indie pop
- Length: 19:41
- Label: Hungry Kids of Hungary / MGM Distribution
- Producer: Emerson Bavinton, Hungry Kids of Hungary

Hungry Kids of Hungary chronology
Hungry Kids of Hungary (2008)	Mega Mountain (2009)

Singles from Hungry Kids of Hungary
- 1. "Set It Right" Released: May 2008

Hungry Kids of Hungary is the debut EP from Brisbane indie-pop band Hungry Kids of Hungary.

At the Q Song Awards of 2009, "Set It Right" won Alternative Song of the Year.

== Track listing ==
1. "All You Need to Know"
2. "Set It Right"
3. "One By One"
4. "Arrest This Heart"
5. "Tell Me Twice"
6. "Lenny"

== Credits ==
- All songs written by Hungry Kids of Hungary
- Mastered by Matt Gray
- Photos by Dickens

== Musicians ==
- Ben Dalton (bass)
- Kane Mazlin (keys, lead vocal on 1, 4 and 6)
- Dean McGrath (guitar and lead vocal on 2, 3 and 5)
- Ryan Strathie (drums)
