= Escapades (Hungry Kids of Hungary album) =

Studio album by Hungry Kids of Hungary
- Released: October 2010
- Recorded: January 2010 – June 2010; Massive Studios, Brisbane
- Genre: Indie pop
- Length: 44:00
- Label: Stop Start
- Producer: Matt Redlich & Hungry Kids of Hungary

Hungry Kids of Hungary chronology
Mega Mountain (2009)	Escapades (2010)	You're a Shadow (2013)

Singles from Escapades
- 1. "Let You Down" Released: November 2009; 2. "Wristwatch" Released: April 2010; 3. "Coming Around" Released: September 2010

Escapades is the debut studio album by Australian indie pop band Hungry Kids of Hungary. Released in Australia on 1 October 2010 on Stop Start. The album was produced by Matt Redlich and peaked on the Australian ARIA chart at number 24. The album also reached #20 in triple j's listeners top 20 album poll at the end of 2010.

The album includes two singles from the band's first two EPs, "Scattered Diamonds" and a re-recorded version of "Set It Right".

== Recording and production ==
Escapades contains material that had been written by the band's Dean McGrath and Kane Mazlin from 2008 through to the album's release in 2010. A total of 47 demos were recorded for the record with the track list resulting in 12 tracks. A further two songs - "Airsick" and "Keep Talking" - were recorded for the album but didn't make the physical release.

The album was recorded in Brisbane with producer/engineer Matt Redlich between January and July 2010 in his home studio called Massive Studios.

Dean McGrath said: "We knew Matt before, he's a Brisbane based producer and engineer, and we knew him on more of a personal basis as a friend of ours. And he recorded the second EP that we released…we had a few options for recording, but in the end it just felt like the right decision to work out of home in Brisbane and to do it with Matt. He works out of the downstairs bit of his house and there's a pool out the back, which is great when you're recording in summer, because we started in January, and it's blistering hot in Brisbane. We'd record for two hours then have a swim and keep recorded…it was great! I think that sort of environment its conducive for us to do good work. We just feel really comfortable; it's the way we operate. You're not on the clock like you are in a major studio, you don't feel like you have to hurry…we just went in and recorded when we could. It was a really nice process."

== Critical response ==
Professional ratings
Review scores
Source	Rating
Time Off	5/5 stars
Rave Mag	4/5 stars

The album was selected to be triple j's Feature Album for the week beginning Monday 4 October and critics were generally favorable of Escapades. It was praised by Time Off reviewer Matt O'Neill who said it was "a meticulously crafted, stunningly accomplished endeavor" and awarded it five out of five star rating. Brisbane's Rave Magazine featured it as Album of the Week with a four star rating and Sydney Morning Herald's Bernard Zuel also gave it four stars saying "You're really going to enjoy this band. Lord knows I do." MX's Nick Mason also gave it four stars while both Craig Mathieson from The Age and Mikey Cahill from Herald Sun gave it three stars.

== Track listing ==
All music and lyrics written by Dean McGrath and Kane Mazlin (as noted below):

1. "Coming Around" – 3:27 (Mazlin)
2. "Wristwatch" – 1:51 (McGrath)
3. "Closer Apart" – 3:43 (McGrath)
4. "Let You Down" – 3:14 (McGrath)
5. "You Ain't Always There" – 3:27 (Mazlin)
6. "Scattered Diamonds" – 3:38 (McGrath)
7. "No Returns" – 3:01 (Mazlin)
8. "Eat Your Heart Out" – 3:53 (McGrath)
9. "Set It Right" – 4:18 (McGrath)
10. "China Will Wait" – 3:38 (Mazlin)
11. "The Vacationer" – 3:40 (McGrath)
12. "The Window Shopper" – 6:19 (Mazlin)

== B-sides ==
1. "Airsick" – 2:55 (Dalton/Mazlin/McGrath) (iTunes bonus track)
2. "Keep Talking" – 3:56 (McGrath) (Online bonus track)

== Charts ==
Chart (2010)	Peak position
Australian Albums (ARIA)	24
