= Perry Keyes =

Australian singer-songwriter (born 1966)

Perry Keyes (born 1966) is an Australian singer-songwriter.

Keyes is based in Waterloo, Sydney and grew up in nearby Redfern. Former singer-songwriter with Sydney band the Stolen Holdens, Keyes' output is best described as heartland rock in that the lyrics detail the minutiae of the seamier side of existence in and around the working class Sydney suburbs. Keyes has been acclaimed as "Redfern's answer to Bruce Springsteen".

Keyes is a supporter of his hometown rugby league club the South Sydney Rabbitohs.

== Career ==
Keyes' debut album Meter - a double - was released in 2005. Second LP The Last Ghost Train Home was named Radio National album of the year and was a finalist for the 2007 Australian Music Prize; it featured cover artwork by Jon Langford.

Keyes' 2010 album Johnny Ray's Downtown was nominated for an ARIA Award at the ARIA Music Awards of 2010.

Sunnyholt (2015) and Jim Salmon's Lament (2018) were both well-reviewed.

Keyes' sixth album Black & White Town was released in November 2023.

== Discography ==
=== Albums ===
Title	Details
Meter	Released: November 2005; Label:Laughing Outlaw Records (LOR2CD-093); Format: 2xCD, digital download
The Last Ghost Train Home	Released: 11 August 2007; Label: Laughing Outlaw Records (LORCD-108); Format: CD, digital download
Johnny Ray's Downtown	Released: 6 March 2010; Label: Laughing Outlaw Records (LORCD-118); Format: CD, digital download
Sunnyholt	Released: January 2015; Label: Laughing Outlaw Records (LORI170CD); Format: CD, digital download
Jim Salmon's Lament	Released: 28 September 2018; Label: MGM (EHCD005); Format: CD, digital download, streaming
Black & White Town	Released: 17 November 2023; Label: Format: LP, CD, digital download, streaming

== Awards and nominations ==
=== ARIA Music Awards ===
The ARIA Music Awards is an annual awards ceremony that recognises excellence, innovation, and achievement across all genres of Australian music. Sultan has been nominated for one award.

Year	Nominee / work	Award	Result
2010	Johnny Ray's Downtown	Best Adult Contemporary Album	Nominated

=== Australian Music Prize ===
The Australian Music Prize (the AMP) is an annual award of $30,000 given to an Australian band or solo artist in recognition of the merit of an album released during the year of award. The commenced in 2005.

Year	Nominee / work	Award	Result
2007	Last Ghost Train Home	Australian Music Prize	Nominated
