= Grand Atlantic =

Australian musical group

- Origin: Brisbane, Queensland, Australia
- Genre: Indie rock
- Years active: 2005–2013
- Labels: Popboomerang / MGM; Laughing Outlaw; Independent
- Past members: Sean Bower; Scott Mullane; Nigel Smith; Phil Usher
- Website: thisisgrandatlantic.com

Grand Atlantic were a Brisbane-based indie rock band, active from 2005 to 2013. They released three albums, This Is Grand Atlantic (May 2007), How We Survive (2009), and Constellations (2011).

== History ==
In October 2005 Grand Atlantic formed at a coffee shop in Paddington, Brisbane. The band members were singer-guitarist Phil Usher, bass guitarist Sean Bower, guitarist Nigel Smith and drummer Scott Mullane. Bower, Mullane and Usher had played together in Tonjip, while this was the first group for Smith. Usher had previously been the drummer for Australian Christian pop rock band, Beanbag from 1996 to 2003.

In 2006 Grand Atlantic recorded an extended play, Smoke and Mirrors, for Melbourne label, Popboomerang. The "2006 Drum Media Writers Poll" listed it as one of the top ten EPs of the Year and the title track's stop-motion video screened nationally via Rage and Channel V. That year they placed third in the Rock Category of the 2006 International Songwriting Competition (ISC) with their track "Coolite", while "Wonderful Tragedy" garnered an ISC Honourable Mention in the main Performance category; both are tracks from their debut album.

In May 2007 the group released their debut album, This Is Grand Atlantic, via Popboomerang with distribution by MGM Distribution, which again was well received. The group toured Australian in support of the album. Richard MacFarlane of Mess+Noise felt "the sounds within are meticulous, and here craftsmanship does not equal engaging listening... because of a naff sort of 90s Britpop-esque that's so mixed to down to the middle that it's almost basking in its own solidness – a knowledge of lightweight rock conventions and how to pull no punches." MediaSearch's Chris Brady opined that "[it] is the sound of a band hinting at great potential. At their best, this Brisbane foursome successfully channel the spirit of sixties psychedelia, with Pepper-esque horns and soaring Pet Sounds harmonies." In that year they toured the East Coast of Australia three times and performed at the Fuse Festival in Adelaide and BigSound in Brisbane.

Grand Atlantic's second album, How We Survive, was widely praised upon release in April 2009. This was especially the case in the US where the band made a significant impact at radio. Again, it was produced by the band, but mixed by Australian producer Magoo. It also saw a change in line-up, with new drummer Mat Von Diehm and guitarist Morgan Hann replacing Mullane and Smith.

Upon release the new line-up toured the album in Australia but it received more attention in the US. The single “She’s a Dreamer” attracted airplay at over 50 US radio stations. In March 2010, Grand Atlantic played their first 15-date US tour across America and Canada after invitations to perform at SXSW and Canadian Music Week. This was followed by further Australian dates and a brief 4-date Japan tour.

In early 2011, the band travelled to Seacliff Lunatic Asylum, an abandoned psychiatric hospital near Dunedin, New Zealand. With producer Dale Cotton they recorded their third album, Constellations, which was self-released. Justin Donnelly of The Metal Forge observed that it was "a little different from what we have come expect from the Grand Atlantic. The pop influences that have infiltrated their former work is still very much evident within the band's eleven new tunes, but it's the overall darker and heavier sounding shoegazer influences that masks the pop/rock side of the band's sound that really dominates the overall feel."

In March 2011 Grand Atlantic returned to the US for a second appearance at SXSW, playing 17 dates in three weeks on both the East and West coasts. The tour resulted in significant licensing outcomes for TV use of their music, including a song on Gossip Girl and promotional spots for the USA Channel.

The "Constellations" album denoted a change in the band's musical style.

== Members ==
- Sean Bower – bass guitar, backing vocals
- Scott Mullane – drums
- Nigel Smith – lead guitar
- Phil Usher – lead vocals, guitar
- Mat Von Diehm – drums
- Morgan Hann – lead guitar, keyboards, backing vocals

== Discography ==
=== Extended plays ===
- Smoke & Mirrors (2006) – Popboomerang B029

=== Albums ===
- This Is Grand Atlantic (May 2007) – Popboomerang/MGM Distribution PB036
- How We Survive (2009) – Laughing Outlaw Records
- Constellations (2011) – Independent
