= Cellophane (Holy Holy album) =

Studio album by Holy Holy
- Released: 22 September 2023
- Length: 43:44
- Labels: Wonderlick; Sony Music Australia
- Producers: Timothy Carroll; Oscar Dawson; Jack Glass; Kwame; Sumner

Holy Holy chronology
Hello My Beautiful World (2021)	Cellophane (2023)	Sweet Bitter Sweet (2025)

Singles from Cellophane
- 1. "Messed Up" Released: 4 March 2023; 2. "Pretend to Be" Released: 2 June 2023; 3. "Neon St" Released: 7 July 2023; 4. "Ready" Released: 31 July 2023; 5. "This Time" Released: 22 September 2023

Cellophane is the fifth studio album by Australian indie rock band Holy Holy, released on 22 September 2023 through Wonderlick Entertainment and Sony Music Australia.

Upon announcement on 11 August 2023, Timothy Carroll said "We formulated this idea of Holy Holy as this kind of songwriting factory". Furthermore, via the press release, Holy Holy said the album is about "shedding their inhibitions, alleviating themselves of the weight of expectation, and pushing their sound to new territory."

To promote the release, Holy Holy performed six intimate events across Australia's east coast in September 2023.

At the 2023 J Awards, the album was nominated for Australian Album of the Year.

== Reception ==
Steve from Eat This Music said "Each track on the album is a showcase of the band's power to collaborate and experiment" calling the album a "genre-bending masterpiece".

== Track listing ==
Cellophane track listing
No.	Title	Writer(s)	Length
1.	"Neon St" (featuring Medhanit)	Timothy Carroll; Oscar Dawson; Rich Kwame Amevor; Medhanit Barratt	3:44
2.	"Pretend to Be"	Carroll; Dawson; Ryan Strathie	3:21
3.	"This Time" (featuring Tasman Keith)	Carroll; Dawson; Tasman Keith; Strathie	3:22
4.	"Heroes" (featuring Darcie Haven)	Carroll; Dawson; Strathie	3:32
5.	"Messed Up" (featuring Kwame)	Carroll; Dawson; Amevor; Strathie	3:28
6.	"Two Minds, Two Days, Two Mornings" (featuring Tia Carys)	Carroll; Dawson; Tia Carys; Strathie	4:36
7.	"People Change"	Carroll; Dawson; Strathie	3:16
8.	"Ready" (featuring Sumner)	Carroll; Dawson; Jack McLaine; Chloe Wilson	3:47
9.	"Ready – Coda"	Carroll; Dawson; McLaine; Strathie; Wilson	2:15
10.	"Can't Relate"	Carroll; Dawson; Strathie	3:48
11.	"Rosé"	Carroll; Dawson; Strathie	3:23
12.	"Oh Listener"	Carroll; Dawson	1:35
13.	"Cellophane" (featuring Many Voices Speak)	Carroll; Dawson; Matilda Mård; Strathie	3:37
Total length:			43:44

== Personnel ==
Holy Holy:

- Timothy Carroll – vocals, production (all tracks)
- Oscar Dawson – bass, guitar, programming, production, mixing, recording (all tracks)

=== Additional musicians ===
- Ryan Strathie – drums (1–7, 9–13)
- Kwame – vocals (1, 5), programming (5)
- Medhanit – vocals (1)
- Jack Glass – programming (2)
- Tasman Keith – vocals (3)
- Darcie Haven – vocals (4)
- Tia Carys – vocals (6)
- Matilda Mård – vocals (13)

=== Technical ===
- Leon Zervos – mastering (all tracks)
- Jack McLaine – production (2, 3), recording (3, 8, 9)
- Kwame – production (3, 5), recording (5)
- Sumner – production (8, 9)
- Peter Nygårdh – recording (13)

== Charts ==
Chart performance for Cellophane
Chart (2023)	Peak position
Australian Albums (ARIA)	4

== Release history ==
Release history and formats for Cellophane
Region	Date	Format(s)	Label	Catalogue	Ref.
Various	22 September 2023	Digital download; streaming	Holy Holy; Wonderlick Entertainment; Sony Music Australia	Not applicable	
Australia	22 September 2023	LP; CD	Holy Holy; Wonderlick; Sony Music Australia	LICK057-LICK062	
