= Sweet Bitter Sweet =

Studio album by Holy Holy
- Released: 9 May 2025
- Label: Wonderlick; Sony Music Australia

Holy Holy chronology
Cellophane (2023)	Sweet Bitter Sweet (2025)

Singles from Sweet Bitter Sweet
- 1. "Love You Still" Released: 25 April 2025; 2. "So Be It" Released: 9 May 2025

Sweet Bitter Sweet is the sixth studio album by Australian indie rock band Holy Holy, released on 9 May 2025 through Wonderlick Entertainment and Sony Music Australia.

Upon announcement Holy Holy said "Initially, we had planned to record acoustic versions of some of our favourite songs from Holy Holy... But creative chemistry sparked new material too." The album will be split into two sections of five new tracks and seven reimagined tracks.

To promote the release, Holy Holy will perform a 17-day tour across Australia through May and June 2025.

A limited edition Record Store Day LP will be released in April 2026.

== Singles ==
Sweet Bitter Sweet was preceded by two singles. The lead single "Love You Still" was released on 25 April 2025. Timothy Carroll said the song is "about enduring love - the kind that remains perpetually, even if you never see that person again." The second single, "So Be It" was released on 9 May 2025. Carroll said the song is "about what it feels like to say goodbye – and how strange and uncomfortable that can be."

== Track listing ==
All tracks are written by Timothy Carroll, Oscar Dawson, and Ryan Strathie, except where noted.

Sweet Bitter Sweet track listing
No.	Title	Lyrics	Music	Length
1.	"Sweet Bitter Sweet"			4:03
2.	"Love You Still"			3:53
3.	"We Think"			4:26
4.	"Island"			3:21
5.	"So Be It"			4:11
6.	"Maybe You Know" (acoustic)			3:47
7.	"Teach Me About Dying" (acoustic)			4:14
8.	"Ready" (acoustic)	Carroll; Dawson; Jack McLaine; Chloe Wilson	Carroll; Dawson; McLaine; Wilson	4:33
9.	"Elevator" (acoustic)	Dawson; Carroll; Strathie	Dawson; Carroll; Matt Redlich; Strathie	4:34
10.	"The Aftergone" (orchestral version) (featuring Clews)	Dawson; Carroll; Kim Moyes; Strathie	Dawson; Carroll; Moyes; Strathie	4:43
11.	"Believe Anything" (orchestral version)			4:36
12.	"Ghosts" (orchestral version)			4:48
Total length:				51:13

== Personnel ==
Credits adapted from Tidal.

=== Holy Holy ===
- Timothy Carroll – vocals, production
- Oscar Dawson – guitar, production (all tracks); mixing, engineering (tracks 1–9); bass, synthesizer (1–5); piano (6–9)

=== Additional contributors ===
- Leon Zervos – mastering
- Ryan Strathie – drums, percussion (tracks 1–5)
- Grace Richardson – engineering (track 10)
- Lily Richardson – engineering (track 10)
- Toby Alexander – engineering (track 10)

== Charts ==
Chart performance for Sweet Bitter Sweet
Chart (2026)	Peak position
Australian Artist Albums (ARIA)	19
