= Hello My Beautiful World =

Studio album by Holy Holy
- Released: 20 August 2021
- Length: 51:37
- Label: Wonderlick; Sony Australia
- Producer: Oscar Dawson; Timothy Carroll

Holy Holy chronology
My Own Pool of Light (2019)	Hello My Beautiful World (2021)	Cellophane (2023)

Singles from Hello My Beautiful World
- 1. "Port Rd" Released: 2 December 2020; 2. "How You Been" Released: 16 April 2021; 3. "Believe Anything" Released: 17 June 2021; 4. "The Aftergone" Released: 15 July 2021; 5. "I.C.U." Released: 20 August 2021

Hello My Beautiful World is the fourth studio album by indie rock band Holy Holy, released on 20 August 2021. The album debuted at number 4 on the ARIA Albums Chart and is their highest ARIA chart peak.

At the 2021 ARIA Music Awards, the album was nominated for Best Rock Album.

At the J Awards of 2021, the album was nominated for Australian Album of the Year.

== Critical reception ==
Professional ratings
Review scores
Source	Rating
The AU Review	4/5 stars
NME Australia	4/5 stars
Rolling Stone Australia	4/5 stars

Dylan Marshall from The AU Review said "Whilst not the perfect album, Hello My Beautiful World forges Holy Holy place as one of Australia's best and most consistent bands. Known for their live shows just as much as for their albums, Hello My Beautiful World leaves Holy Holy incredibly well placed to continuing cementing their place in the upper echelons of the Australian music landscape. Their ability to meld a variety of genres and styles together is a testament to their abilities as musicians and as a band. Hello My Beautiful World is their best album yet."

Jake Cleland from Stack Magazine called it "grounded but epic" and "a tremendous package".

Tyler Jenke from Rolling Stone Australia said "At its core, Hello My Beautiful World is a record seemingly created, whether intentionally or not, to feel like an escape. The way in which they allow tracks to flow on, to evolve, and to truly take form with the codas of 'The Aftergone', 'I.C.U.' and 'So Tired' evokes memories of a concept album of sorts, breaking free of traditional song-by-song track listing, escaping its confines, and instead feeling like a grander art piece." Jenke concluded saying "Expansive, cinematic, rhythmic and truly immersive, Holy Holy at no point show any signs of a global pandemic having hindered their creative process on Hello My Beautiful World and instead provide a mesmerising escape from the drudgery of modern life, while focusing on the beautiful moments that we've missed."

Cyclone Wehner from NME Australia wrote that "Hello is a meditative yet uplifting album that fosters calm and collectivity in response to pandemic existentialism." adding "The album's zenith is the empathetic overture 'Stand Where I'm Standing'".

== Track listing ==
All tracks are written by Holy Holy. "The Aftergone" co-written by Kim Moyes; "The Aftergone (Coda)" co-written by Beiath Mathiang.

Hello My Beautiful World track listing
No.	Title	Length
1.	"Believe Anything"	4:14
2.	"How You Been"	3:42
3.	"The Aftergone" (featuring Clews)	3:55
4.	"The Aftergone (Coda)"	2:04
5.	"Port Rd" (featuring Queen P.)	3:21
6.	"Hello My Beautiful World"	4:16
7.	"Ghosts"	4:54
8.	"I.C.U."	3:46
9.	"I.C.U. (Coda)"	2:31
10.	"Stand Where I'm Standing"	3:55
11.	"Shoreditch"	5:05
12.	"So Tired"	4:08
13.	"So Tired (Coda)"	2:12
14.	"Here and Now"	3:34
Total length:		51:37

== Personnel ==
Holy Holy

- Oscar Dawson – performance, production, mixing, engineering
- Timothy Carroll – performance, production (all tracks); engineering (tracks 3–7, 10, 11, 14)

Other musicians

- Ryan Strathie – live drums
- Toby Alexander – string arrangements
- Kim Moyes – extra synthesizers and programming
- Gab Strum – extra synthesizers and programming
- Jackson McRae – extra drums and percussion
- Emily Sanzaro – harp
- Lizzy Welch – violin
- Naomi Wileman – cello
- Biddy Connor – viola

Technical

- Gab Strum – additional production (tracks 1, 2, 10, 11)
- Kim Moyes – additional production (tracks 3, 4)
- Leon Zervos – mastering
- Jack McLaine – engineering (tracks 1, 2, 5, 11, 12)
- Adrian Breakspear – engineering (track 3)

Visuals

- Timothy Lovett – artwork, design

== Charts ==
Chart performance for Hello My Beautiful World
Chart (2021)	Peak position
Australian Albums (ARIA)	4

== Release history ==
Release history and formats for Hello My Beautiful World
Region	Date	Format(s)	Label	Catalogue	Ref.
Various	20 August 2021	Digital download; streaming	Holy Holy; Wonderlick Entertainment; Sony Music Australia	Not applicable	
Australia	20 August 2021	CD	Holy Holy; Wonderlick; Sony Music Australia	LICK049	
Australia	20 August 2021	LP (clear vinyl)	Holy Holy; Wonderlick; Sony Music Australia	LICK050	
