= Roses (The Paper Kites album) =

Studio album by the Paper Kites
- Released: 12 March 2021
- Label: Wonderlick; Sony Australia
- Producer: Sam Bentley, Tom Iansek, The Paper Kites

The Paper Kites chronology
On the Corner Where You Live (2018)	Roses (2021)	At the Roadhouse (2023)

Singles from Roses
- 1. "For All You Give" Released: August 2020; 2. "By My Side" Released: September 2020; 3. "Without Your Love" Released: November 2020; 4. "Walk Above the City" Released: February 2021

Roses is the fifth studio album by the Australian band the Paper Kites. It was released on 12 March 2021 by Wonderlick Entertainment and Sony Music Australia. The album debuted at number 23 on the ARIA Charts.

Upon announcement in September 2020, the band said, "We weren't sure if this album was going to be possible for us to do this year, if at all, and the challenge of a collaborative record was uncharted territory for us. This album is a collection songs we purposely wrote to record with these artists – artists that we have a great love and appreciation for. A lot of care and thought went into writing and recording it, and we're honoured to have worked with these truly great and remarkable singers."

== Critical reception ==
A staff writer at Double J said "On Roses, the band have looked outside of their core line-up and invited a string of acclaimed vocalists into their ranks, each of whom lends a point of difference to these luscious indie folk tunes." They added "The deep and slow-moving songs of Roses make it a beautiful record on its own merits. Add a bevy of the world's most captivating vocalists and it becomes something even more special."

Dan Cromb from The Line of Best Fit gave the album 7/10 and said "Whilst it doesn't deviate too much from what we've come to expect from them, it certainly demonstrates their knack for picking collaborators wisely and remaining true to the calming indie-folk sound that made their name.". Cromb called it "a warmly cohesive album". Keith Hargreaves from Americana UK also gave the album 7/10.

Arun Kendall from Backseat Mafia rated the album 9/10 and called it "A breathtakingly beautiful album that has an indelible sheen and stature."

== Track listing ==
All tracks are written by Samuel Bentley.

Roses track listing
No.	Title	Length
1.	"Walk Above the City" (featuring Maro)	4:00
2.	"Climb On Your Tears" (featuring Aoife O'Donovan)	6:04
3.	"Dearest" (featuring Lydia Cole)	3:15
4.	"Steal My Heart Away" (featuring Ainslie Wills)	5:49
5.	"Without Your Love" (featuring Julia Stone)	3:30
6.	"Crossfire" (featuring Amanda Bergman)	5:18
7.	"Lonely" (featuring Gena Rose Bruce)	3:42
8.	"Take Me Home" (featuring Nadia Reid)	4:54
9.	"For All You Give" (featuring Lucy Rose)	3:11
10.	"By My Side" (featuring Rosie Carney)	4:16

== Charts ==
Chart performance for Roses
Chart (2021)	Peak position
Australian Albums (ARIA)	23
UK Americana Albums (OCC)	19
