= The Pacific EP =

EP by Holy Holy
- Released: 28 March 2014
- Recorded: 2013
- Genre: Indie rock
- Length: 10:55
- Label: Wonderlick; Sony
- Producer: Matt Redlich

Holy Holy chronology
The Pacific EP (2014)	When the Storms Would Come (2015)

Singles from The Pacific EP
- 1. "House of Cards" Released: 28 February 2014; 2. "Impossible Like You" Released: 21 March 2014

The Pacific EP is the debut extended play by indie rock band Holy Holy, released on 28 March 2014 by Wonderlick Entertainment and distributed by Sony Music Australia.

== Release ==
The Pacific EP was released on CD, digital download and streaming on 28 March 2014. The EP was released by Wonderlick Entertainment, with distribution by Sony Music Australia.

== Singles ==
"House of Cards" was released on 28 February 2014 as the EP's lead single. a re-recorded version of "Impossible Like You" was released on 21 March 2014 as the EP's second single.

== Critical reception ==
Professional ratings
Review scores
Source	Rating
The AU Review	8.9/10 stars
The Brag	4/5 stars

Labelling the release "pure quality", Liz Elleson of The Brag said: "The songwriting is simple but nostalgic and anthemic, and the EP as a whole is densely musical and texturally fascinating."

Ally Cole of AAA Backstage said: "The Pacific EP is a release full of crescendos. With lyrics covering themes of humanity in the unknown, mortality and divinity, the four songs drive home narratives with building soundtracks of duelling guitars, harmony-riddled vocals and commanding percussion." Cole continued, saying: "the strength of Holy Holy can simply be put down to a sheer dedication to craft. Their songs have a timeless quality, fusing impeccable songwriting, thought-provoking lyrics, near-flawless performances, and lush production."

Oliver Friend of Forte Magazine believed the EP would make many "indie festival fans very happy and excited" and labelled "House of Cards" the standout track.

Alexander Crowden from Beat Magazine said the EP sounded "something like all of the best indie-rock songs of the past two years combined into four tracks", before concluding the review by saying "[The Pacific EP] is a creative and enjoyable first step".

Gemma Bastiani of The AU Review wrote "The Pacific makes its way into your head and swirls around until you are well and truly satisfied with your choice to listen." She added that the band had "manage[d] to pull off one of the hardest things in modern music: drawing clear inspiration from matured acts, while still sounding completely fresh and new."

== Track listing ==
The Pacific EP track listing
No.	Title	Writer(s)	Length
1.	"House of Cards"	Timothy Carroll; Oscar Dawson; Ryan Strathie	4:07
2.	"Impossible Like You"	Carroll; Dawson; Strathie	3:31
3.	"Slow Melody"	Carroll; Dawson	3:50
4.	"Cincinnati"	Carroll; Dawson	3:27
Total length:			10:55

== Personnel ==
Adapted from the EP's liner notes.

=== Musicians ===
Holy Holy

- Timothy Carroll – writing, vocals, guitar (1–4)
- Oscar Dawson – writing, guitar, keyboards (1–4), bass (1–2)
- Ryan Strathie – writing (1–2), drums (1–2, 4)
- Matt Redlich – keyboard (1–4)

Other musicians

- Hannah Macklin – backing vocals (1, 3–4)
- Joe Franklin – bass (3–4)
- Myka Wallace – drums (3)

=== Technical ===
- William Bowden – mastering (1–4)
- Matt Redlich – mixing, production (1–4)

=== Artwork ===
- Charles Hillhouse – cover
- Phoebe Jojo Dann – design
