= The Paper Kites =

Australian rock band

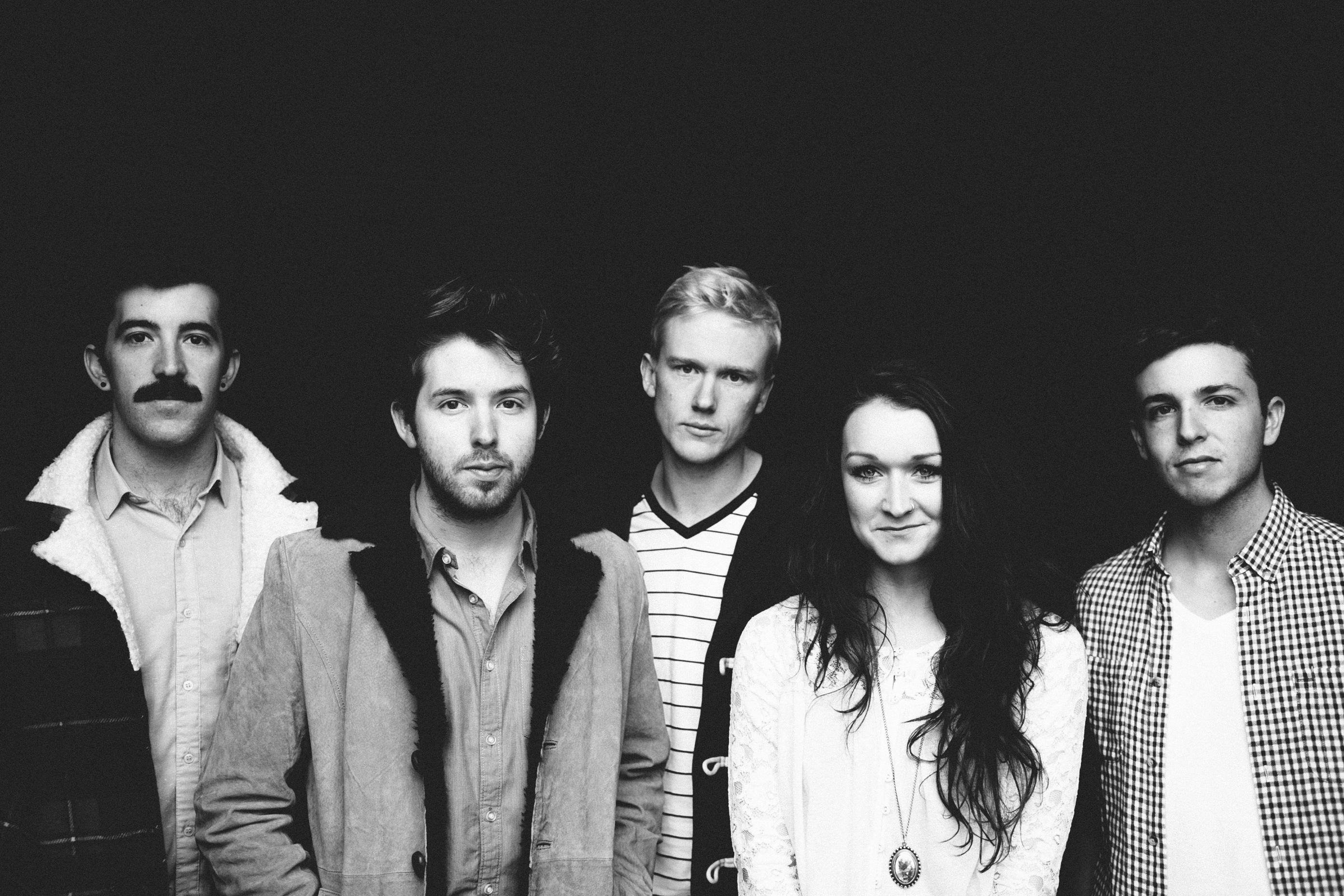
- The Paper Kites in 2012. L–R: David Powys, Sam Bentley, Sam Rasmussen, Christina Lacy, Josh Bentley

Background information
- Origin: Melbourne, Australia
- Genres: Indie rock; folk rock
- Years active: 2009–present
- Labels: Nettwerk; Wonderlick
- Members: Sam Bentley; Christina Lacy; David Powys; Sam Rasmussen; Josh Bentley
- Website: thepaperkites.com.au

The Paper Kites are an Australian indie rock/folk rock band from Melbourne. The band was formed in 2009 by lead vocalist/guitarist Sam Bentley and keyboardist/guitarist Christina Lacy. Their 2010 single "Bloom" has been certified Platinum in the United States. As of 2026, they have released seven studio albums and two EPs. Their latest, If You Go There, I Hope You Find It, was released on 23 January 2026.

== History ==
Before the formation of the Paper Kites, the current five members were close friends. In high school, Bentley and Lacy began writing and playing music together, and continued to do so for a few years after high school. They gained some attention by playing in their home town of Melbourne. In 2010, Bentley and Lacy expanded the line adding Sam Rasmussen, David Powys and Josh Bentley to the group.

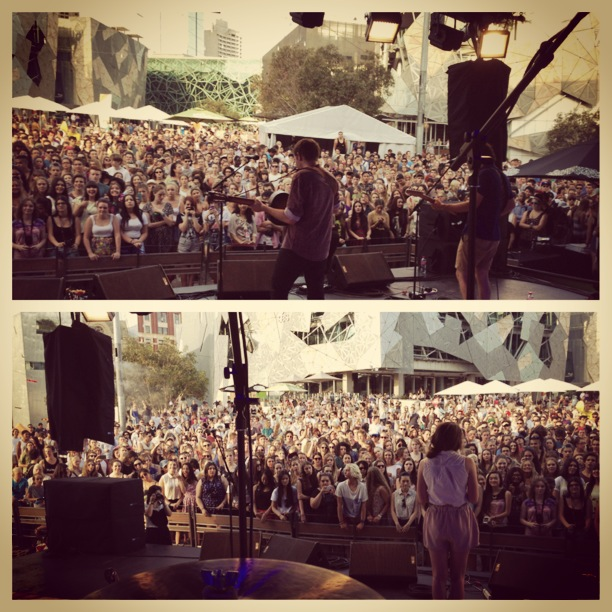
The Paper Kites playing at Federation Square in Melbourne, January 2013

=== 2010: Career beginnings ===
The band's first demo recordings were done mostly by Sam Bentley at his home and by Rasmussen at his university. At the request of their friends, they put together and released homemade EPs to sell at their shows in Melbourne.

It was not until they recorded and released their single "Bloom" in 2010 that they began attracting media attention. The single and video were released online and gradually grew in popularity. Bentley mentioned, "It was a pretty steady progression of word of mouth, friends telling their friends and so on. It wasn't any sort of viral thing, it was a really natural build up of people sharing our music". Word spread quickly, and live appearances became increasingly well attended. "Bloom" was released by the band, similarly to the first recordings, only available as a hand-made CD singles with a handful of other tracks. Only about 500 "Bloom" singles were made by the band.

=== 2011–2012: Woodland and Young North ===
The Paper Kites went on to begin writing and recording what would be their first EP, Woodland. They recorded the EP early in 2011 with Tim Johnston, who was one of Rasmussen's university teachers. "Featherstone", was released in June 2011 in advance of the EP. About the "Featherstone" video, Bentley said, "We always like to get really involved in the videos we make and the people we work with. Our music videos are just further extensions of the song itself, and we always want them to be interesting and engaging. We work pretty closely with our directors." Sam Bentley commented that he felt very lucky for the amount of success "Bloom" and "Featherstone" gained online. That August their debut EP Woodland was released.

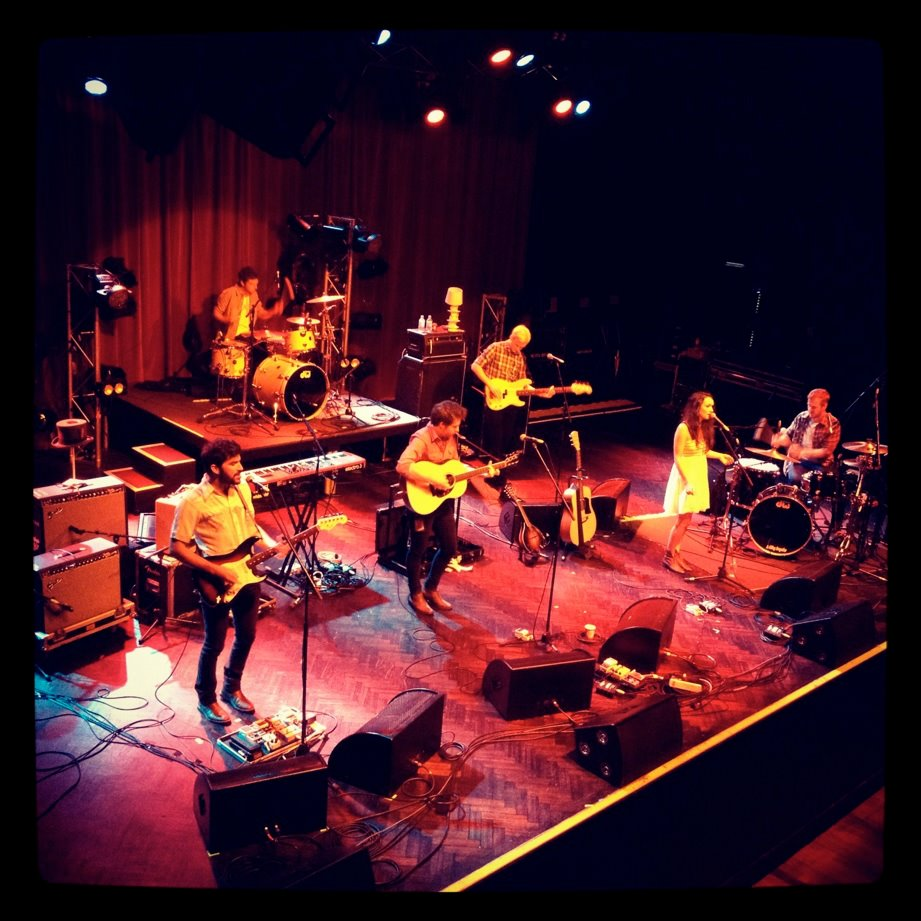
The Paper Kites playing The Palace Theatre in Melbourne, November 2011

In February 2012, the band went on their first headline tour of Australia, playing sold-out shows in small clubs around the country. With the success of Woodland, the band began getting requests for their music on various US television shows, including "Featherstone" being featured in the season 8 finale of Grey's Anatomy.

In April 2012, the band had over 30 unrecorded demos and were ready to start recording a full-length record. However, they decided to hold off making a full-length album and release a second EP instead, feeling that more touring and building on their sound would be beneficial before releasing their debut record. They decided to work with engineer and producer Wayne Connolly, and recorded the five-track EP through June 2012. It was the band's first time working with a producer. Bentley recalled, "Working with Wayne (Connolly) was very different to how we imagined working with a producer would be. He was very patient while at the same time pushed the best performance out of us. He really got inside the songs and knew how to push our sonic ideas".

The first single, "A Maker of My Time", was released in July and was quickly picked up by Australian alternative station Triple J. The band also collaborated with Sydney director Jefferton James on the video, capturing a one-take improvised performance from Tendai Dzwairo, just east of the town of Mildura. Young North was released in August 2012. The Paper Kites embarked on a 13-date Young North tour of Australia in October. They found that along with progressing their sound and live performance they were attracting bigger crowds and selling out larger rooms.

Following the tour, the band did a small run of shows opening for UK band Bombay Bicycle Club in January 2013.

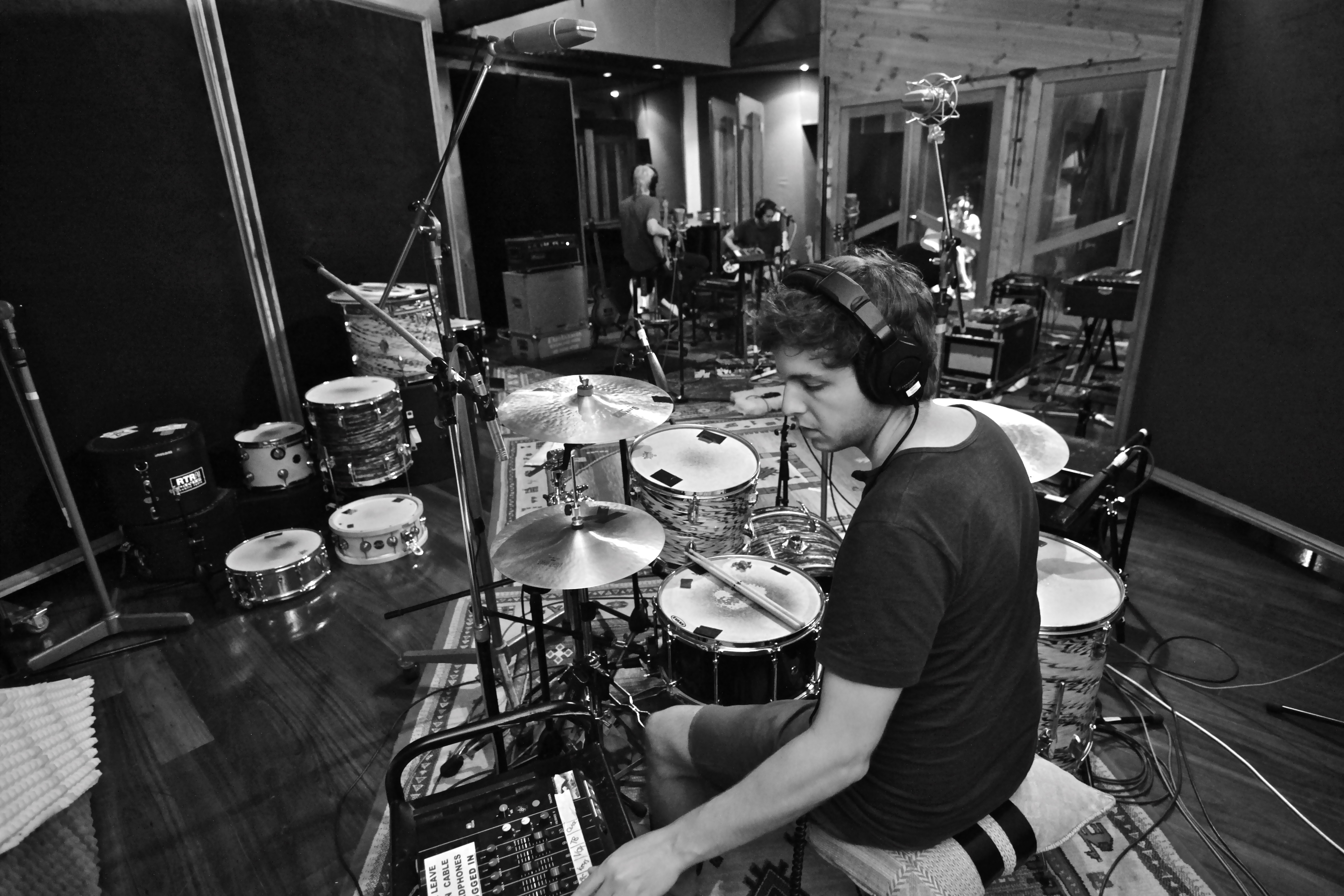
Drummer Josh Bentley setting up at Sing Sing studios in Melbourne in February 2013, for the first recording session for The Paper Kites' debut album.

=== 2013–2014: States ===
The Paper Kites began recording their debut full-length album States in February 2013, collaborating once again with producer Wayne Connolly. The album was recorded at Sing Sing Studios in Melbourne, and Alberts Studios in Sydney.

In August 2013, the band released States and it peaked at number 17 on the ARIA Charts. In October, they made their first trip to America, opening for Canadian band City and Colour on a 13-date tour across the country. States was released in North America on 1 October 2013.

"St Clarity" was the first single released from the record. The music video was directed by acclaimed Australian director Natasha Pincus, starring the French artist Sylvain Letuvée. The second single "Young" was released soon after. The video was directed by Darcy Prendergast, and featured over 4000 portrait photos taken and arranged to make up the video, which was later nominated for Australian Music Video of the Year at the J Awards of 2013.

=== 2015–2017: Twelvefour ===
The band released their second album Twelvefour on 28 August 2015. The album was recorded in Seattle and produced by Grammy-nominated music producer Phil Ek. The sessions took place across two studios—the Avast Recording Company and Chris Walla's studio Hall of Justice. The record is a concept album written entirely between the hours of midnight and four am. The first single, "Electric Indigo", was released in June with a music video following starring actress Laura Brent and Charles Grounds. "Revelator Eyes", "Renegade" and "Too Late" followed as singles.

Along with the announcement of the album was news of a Twelvefour documentary directed by filmmaker Matthew J Cox that followed the band's creation of the album, which has yet to surface. In January 2017 the band released two outtakes from the Twelvefour sessions on Spotify.

=== 2018–2020: On the Train Ride Home and On the Corner Where You Live ===
On 18 April 2018, the band released the first of two new albums, On the Train Ride Home, consisting of eight tracks. The album was recorded in Melbourne at Bellbird Studios with Tom Iansek co producing with singer Sam Bentley. The record was a largely acoustic collection and the release was un-announced. The follow-up album, On the Corner Where You Live, was released on 21 September 2018. The album was recorded at Tarquin Studios in Connecticut with producer Peter Katis working with the band. The artwork for both On the Train Ride Home and On the Corner Where You Live were painted by Los Angeles noir artist Gina Higgins, who worked with Bentley on the pieces.

The band embarked on their Where You Live tour on 16 July 2018 playing a 93-show tour, with shows in the US, Canada, Europe, Australia and New Zealand. The tour concluded on 15 December 2019 in London.

At the ARIA Music Awards of 2019, On the Corner Where You Live was nominated for Best Adult Contemporary Album.

=== 2021: Roses ===
In August 2020, the band announced their fifth studio album Roses, a collaborative album of duets. The album features Julia Stone, Lucy Rose, Rosie Carney, Aoife O'Donovan, Nadia Reid, Maro, Amanda Bergman, Ainslie Wills, Lydia Cole and Gena Rose Bruce. The album was released on 12 March 2021.

The song “Without Your Love” featuring Julia Stone was featured in the American award winning NBC television series This is Us.

=== 2022–2024: At the Roadhouse ===
In May 2023, the band's sixth studio album, At the Roadhouse, was announced. The album was recorded in July 2022 in an old diggers store in Campbells Creek, Australia, where the band played the songs to a live audience for free on Friday and Saturday nights, joined by musicians Matt Dixon, Hannah Cameron and Chris Panousakis. Supported by six singles, At the Roadhouse was released on 1 September 2023. The songs on the 16-track album have been described as indie-folk, folk and folk-rock.

=== 2025: If You Go There, I Hope You Find It ===
In September 2025, the group announced the forthcoming release of If You Go There, I Hope You Find It, which was released in January 2026.

== Musical style ==
The Paper Kites' sound was originally loosely based around folk music. Sam Bentley's fingerstyle guitar sound is a frequent characteristic, along with Lacy's and his voices together, and the band's harmonies. The progression of this sound, along with the band's many musical inspirations, has pushed them into a range of different genres. When asked about their style of music, Bentley has mentioned, "We are whatever we released on the last record". The band is known for switching instruments live and for their ethereal, moody sound.

== Members ==
- Sam Bentley – lead vocals, guitar, keyboards (2009–present)
- Christina Lacy – guitar, keyboards, backing vocals (2009–present)
- Josh Bentley – drums, percussion (2010–present)
- David Powys – guitars, banjo, lap steel, backing vocals (2010–present)
- Sam Rasmussen – bass guitar, synthesizers (2010–present)

=== The Roadhouse Band ===
- Hannah Cameron – piano, percussion, backing vocals (2023–present)
- Chris Panousakis – guitar, percussion, backing vocals (2023–present)
- Matt Dixon – pedal steel, guitar (2023–present)

== Discography ==
=== Studio albums ===
Title	Details	Peak chart positions	
Title	Details	AUS	UK Americana
States	Released: 1 August 2013; Label: Wonderlick Entertainment, Sony (LICK005); Formats: CD, digital download, streaming	17	—
Twelvefour	Released: 28 August 2015; Label: Wonderlick, Sony (LICK014/LICK015); Formats: CD, digital download, streaming, vinyl	8	—
On the Train Ride Home	Released: 18 April 2018; Label: Wonderlick, Sony; Formats: digital download, streaming	—	—
On the Corner Where You Live	Released: 21 September 2018; Label: Wonderlick, Sony (LICK026); Formats: CD, digital download, streaming, vinyl	48	—
Roses	Released: 12 March 2021; Label: Wonderlick, Sony (LICK040); Formats: CD, digital download, streaming, vinyl	23	16
At the Roadhouse	Released: 1 September 2023; Label: Wonderlick, Sony (LICK055); Formats: CD, digital download, streaming, vinyl	68	12
If You Go There, I Hope You Find It	Released: 23 January 2026; Label: Wonderlick, Sony (LICK065); Formats: CD, digital download, streaming, vinyl	13	19

=== Box Set / Compilations ===
Title	Album details
Woodland + Young North: EP Box Set	Released: 2013 (US), 2016 (Europe); Re-released as Evergreen on 20 April 2024 as a US+EU Record Store Day Exclusive.; Label: Nettwerk (NTCD05) / (31321-1)

=== Extended plays ===
Title	EP details
Woodland	Released: August 2011; Label: The Paper Kites; Format: CD, digital download, streaming
Young North	Released: August 2012; Label: The Paper Kites; Format: CD, digital download, streaming

=== Singles ===
Title	Year	Certification	Albums
"Bloom"	2010	BPI: Platinum; FIMI: Gold; IFPI: Gold; MC: Platinum; RIAA: Platinum	Woodland (bonus track)
"Featherstone"	2011		Woodland
"A Maker of My Time"	2012		Young North
"St. Clarity"	2013		States
"Young"	2013		States
"Tenenbaum"	2014		States
"Electric Indigo"	2015		Twelvefour
"Revelator Eyes"	2015		Twelvefour
"Renegade"	2016		Twelvefour
"Too Late"	2016		Twelvefour
"Holes" / "Breathing Fighting Love" (Note: "Holes" and "Breathing Fighting Love" were released digitally with the title "Twelvefour: Outtakes".)	2017		Non-album single
"On the Train Ride Home"	2018		On the Train Ride Home
"Deep Burn Blue"	2018		On the Corner Where You Live
"Give Me Your Fire, Give Me Your Rain"	2018		On the Corner Where You Live
"Does it Ever Cross Your Mind"	2018		On the Corner Where You Live
"For All You Give" (featuring Lucy Rose)	2020		Roses
"By My Side" (featuring Rosie Carney)	2020		Roses
"Without Your Love" (featuring Julia Stone)	2020		Roses
"Walk Above the City" (featuring Maro)	2021		Roses
"The Sweet Sound of You"	2023		At the Roadhouse
"Till the Flame Turns Blue"	2023		At the Roadhouse
"Hurts So Good"	2023		At the Roadhouse
"Black & Thunder"	2023		At the Roadhouse
"I Don't Want to Go That Way"	2023		At the Roadhouse
"June's Stolen Car"	2023		At the Roadhouse
"When the Lavender Blooms"	2025		If You Go There, I Hope You Find It
"Every Town"	2025		If You Go There, I Hope You Find It
"Believe"	2025		Tea & Sympathy (20th anniversary)
"Shake Off the Rain"	2025		If You Go There, I Hope You Find It
"Change of the Wind"	2025		If You Go There, I Hope You Find It
"Morning Gum"	2026		If You Go There, I Hope You Find It

== Awards and nominations ==
=== ARIA Awards ===
The ARIA Music Awards is an annual awards ceremony that recognises excellence, innovation, and achievement across all genres of Australian music.

Year	Nominee / work	Award	Result	Ref.
2019	On The Corner Where You Live	Best Adult Contemporary Album	Nominated	
2024	At the Roadhouse	Best Blues & Roots Album	Nominated	
2026	If You Go There, I Hope You Find It	Best Adult Contemporary Album	Nominated	

=== J Awards ===
The J Awards are an annual series of Australian music awards that were established by the Australian Broadcasting Corporation's youth-focused radio station Triple J. They commenced in 2005.

Year	Nominee / work	Award	Result	Ref.
2013	"Young"	Australian Video of the Year	Nominated	
