= Crooked Beat Records =

American independent record label

- Founded: 1997
- Founder: Bill Daly
- Genre: Punk, indie rock, jazz, reggae, soul, hip-hop
- Country of origin: U.S.
- Location: 2101-B Mt. Vernon Avenue, Alexandria, Virginia
- Official website: CrookedBeat.com

Crooked Beat Records, based in Alexandria, Virginia, is an independent record label which puts out music by artists from the Washington, DC area. The Crooked Beat label is affiliated with a record store of the same name. Crooked Beat has produced five seven-inch records and nine albums, including tributes to The Clash and Jonathan Richman. Records released by Crooked Beat Records are distributed nationally for Record Store Day.

== Label ==
Crooked Beat Records and the affiliated store are owned and operated by Bill Daly. Daly previously operated a record label called Crisis Discs in Raleigh, North Carolina, during the 1990s. Daly is also a member of the band Insurgence DC, previously known as Insurgence. Insurgence DC has recorded for both Crisis Discs and Crooked Beat Records.

The first releases from Crooked Beat Records were issued in 2014, and included seven-inch records by Insurgence DC and Möbius Strip. Three additional seven-inch records were released for Record Store Day 2015. Crooked Beat Records produced singles LPs in 2016, 2017, 2019, and 2020; and a double LP in 2018.

The first LP released by Crooked Beat Records, "A Bang on the Ear," included music by Insurgence DC, Möbius Strip, and Don Zientara. The record was released for Record Store Day 2016.

In 2017, Crooked Beat Records issued "Recutting the Crap, Volume One," released for Record Store Day 2017. "Recutting the Crap, Volume One," is a tribute to The Clash, with various US artists performing songs from the Clash album "Cut the Crap," as well as two songs from the B-side of the single This Is England. The record features bands from the DC metropolitan area, and from around the U.S. The Violets, a band from Athens, Georgia, reformed after 25 years of inactivity to record a song for "Recutting the Crap, Volume One." The Violets had been active from 1988 to 1992, and had previously recorded "I Hate The Grateful Dead" for Bill Daly's first label, Crisis Discs. Other artists contributing to "Recutting the Crap, Volume One" included Don Zientara; Too Much Joy, Insurgence DC, Geisha Hit Squad, and The Scotch Bonnets.

For Record Store Day 2018, Crooked Beat Records issued "Recutting the Crap, Volume Two." "Recutting the Crap, Volume Two," like Volume One, features various U.S. artists performing newly recorded versions of songs from The Clash's "Cut The Crap" sessions. Crooked Beat Records also included a bonus record entitled "The Future Was Unwritten," with various artists covering Joe Strummer/Mick Jones compositions written after The Clash broke up.

For Record Store Day 2019, Crooked Beat Records issued "Broken In The Theater of the Absurd," the first full-length album by Insurgence DC in 20 years. "Broken In The Theater of the Absurd" includes new 2018 mixes of "Poison Profits" and "Dishonor," originally issued in 2015 on Crooked Beat CB014, and "True To Life," originally issued in 2014 on Crooked Beat CB011.

For the third 2020 Record Store Day Drop on October 24, 2020, Crooked Beat Records issued "Athens, GA 1988-1992," a collection of songs by The Violets. This release includes "I Hate The Grateful Dead," previously released by Crisis Discs. The Violets also previously contributed to the prior Crooked Beat releases "Recutting the Crap," Volumes One and Two.

For the second 2021 Record Store Day Drop on July 17, 2021, Crooked Beat Records released "Songs from The Astral Plane, Volume One: A Tribute to Jonathan Richman & The Modern Lovers." The album included contributions from The Violets, The Scotch Bonnets, Wonderlick, and the North Carolina band Finger. The track from Finger was the band's first new recording in over twenty-five years.

Tim Hinely of Blurt Online praised Crooked Beat's first release, "True To Life / Man in Black" by Insurgence DC, citing its "rabble-rousing anthemism." The music website "Divide And Conquer" described Indiobravo's debut release for Crooked Beat, "Breakdown / Crawl Back," as sounding "live, raw and unprocessed."

The Pittsburgh Post-Gazette described "Recutting The Crap, Volume One" as "a collector's delight of various artists' versions of songs from The Clash." Steve Shafer of "Duff Guide to Ska" favorably reviewed "Recutting The Crap, Volume One," saying that "The Scotch Bonnets' terrific, stripped-down reggae take on...'Are You Red...Y' alone is worth the cost of this LP." In a subsequent review, Shafer described "Recutting The Crap, Volume Two," as "largely succeed[ing] in redeeming Strummer's Clash II legacy." Shafer described Insurgence DC's version of "This Is England" as "a truly great Clash song made even better here."

On June 29, 2019, Crooked Beat Records participated in a "D.C. Music Preservation Pop-Up" held as part of the 2019 Smithsonian Folklife Festival. Crooked Beat was one of a number of independent record labels from the Washington, D.C. area to appear at a Smithsonian-sponsored Local Record Market.

On July 31, 2021, the Jonathan Richman tribute album "Songs from The Astral Plane, Vol. 1" entered the Billboard Compilation Album charts at #23.

On Record Store Day, April 22, 2023, Crooked Beat released the LP "Displacement" by El Quatro. A month later El Quatro played an in-store show at the Crooked Beat Record's store before they moved to their latest location.

On Record Store Day, April 12, 2025, Crooked Beat Records released two titles: "Ripe For The Trade-Off (30th Anniversary)" by Insurgence DC and "Songs from The Astral Plane, Volume Two: A Tribute to Jonathan Richman & The Modern Lovers." The Insurgence DC double LP was an official Record Store Release and featured new mixes from David Barbe. "Songs from the Astral Plane Volume Two" was the follow-up to 2021 Volume One release. Several artists featured on the Jonathan Richmond Tribute played a pre-release show at the Crooked Beat Records store on March 29, 2025.

== Store ==
Daly founded a record store called Crooked Beat Records in 1997 in Raleigh, N.C. In 2004, Crooked Beat Records moved to 18th Street in the Adams Morgan section of Washington, D.C. From 2004 until 2006, the Adams Morgan store was operated by Bill Daly and Neal Becton as a shared retail space. In 2006, Becton left and opened Som Records, a competing record store still operating in Washington D.C. Crooked Beat Records remained in Washington for twelve years, until moving to Alexandria, Virginia, in 2016. Before moving to Alexandria, Crooked Beat Records was named one of the best record stores in the Washington, D.C., area in 2015. Since moving to Alexandria, the business organization Visit Alexandria named Crooked Beat Records in a list of "11 Shops That Are Worth The Trip In Old Town Alexandria."

In 2023, Crooked Beat Records moved to the Del Ray section of Alexandria after their previous location was scheduled to be demolished and repurposed.

In 1997, when Crooked Beat Records opened in Raleigh, N.C., approximately 30% of sales came from vinyl records. By 2011, vinyl records accounted for "99 percent of total sales," according to Daly. In 2011, Crooked Beat Records ceased sales of CDs, except for albums by local artists. Crooked Beat Records specializes in sales of both new and used vinyl.

== Discography ==
=== Singles and EPs ===
Year	Catalog No.	Artist	Title
2014	CB011	Insurgence DC	"True to Life / Man in Black"
2014	CB012	Möbius Strip	"Palabras Podridas"
2015	CB013	Indiobravo	"Breakdown / Crawl Back"
2015	CB014	Insurgence DC	"Poison Profits / Dishonor"
2015	CB015	The Everymen	"Spaceship Opening (A Very Short Tribute To Eric's Trip)"

=== Albums ===
Year	Catalog No.	Artist	Title
2016	CB016	Insurgence DC; Möbius Strip; Don Zientara	A Bang on the Ear
2017	CB017	Various Artists	Recutting the Crap, Volume One
2018	CB018 / CB018.5	Various Artists	Recutting the Crap, Volume Two: Cat. No. CB018: Recutting the Crap, Volume Two; Cat. No. CB018.5: The Future Was Unwritten
2019	CB019	Insurgence DC	Broken In The Theater of the Absurd
2020	CB020	The Violets	Athens, GA 1988-1992
2021	CB021	Various Artists	Songs from the Astral Plane, Volume One: A Tribute to Jonathan Richman & The Modern Lovers
2023	CB022	El Quatro	Displacement
2025	CB023	Various Artists	Songs from the Astral Plane, Volume Two: A Tribute to Jonathan Richman & The Modern Lovers
2025	CB024	Insurgence DC	Ripe for the Trade Off (30th Anniversary)
