= Sentimental and Monday =

2015 single by Holy Holy

Single by Holy Holy

from the album When the Storms Would Come
- Released: 10 July 2015
- Length: 4:15
- Label: Wonderlick, Sony
- Songwriter(s): Timothy Carroll, Oscar Dawson, Ryan Strathie
- Producer(s): Matt Redlich

Holy Holy singles chronology
"You Cannot Call For Love Like a Dog" (2015)	"Sentimental and Monday" (2015)	"Darwinism" (2016)

Music video
- "Sentimental and Monday" on YouTube

"Sentimental and Monday" is a song by Australian indie rock group Holy Holy, released on 10 July 2015 as the third and final single from their debut studio album When the Storms Would Come.

The song is inspired by winter in Sweden, where Tim Carroll spent 2011. The group said the song is "inspired by the onset of winter and the feeling of the long, dark season approaching"."

The song was certified gold in Australia in 2021.

== Reception ==
Samantha Armatys from How Land Echoes said "It is contemplative and composed while still providing the psychedelic solos and detailed layers that make up the pair's signature sound."

Matt Dillion from Turntable Kitchen said "'Sentimental and Monday' is a melancholic tale of leaving things behind – although vocalist Timothy Carroll's voice helps soften the blow. Rustic and pastoral, it feels like a worn, tweed, three button vest with each note sung, and carries a sense of comfort and home with it throughout the song."

== Certifications ==
Region	Certification	Certified units/sales
Australia (ARIA)	Gold	35,000^{‡}
^{‡} Sales+streaming figures based on certification alone.
