= States (album) =

Studio album by The Paper Kites
- Released: 1 October 2013
- Studios: Sing Sing Studios; Albert Studios
- Genre: Indie folk
- Length: 56:03
- Labels: Wonderlick; Sony Australia
- Producers: The Paper Kites; Wayne Connolly

The Paper Kites chronology
Young North (2012)	States (2013)	twelvefour (2015)

Singles from States
- 1. "St. Clarity" Released: 21 June 2013; 2. "Young" Released: 10 October 2013; 3. "Tenenbaum" Released: March 2014

States is the debut studio album by Australian indie folk band, the Paper Kites. The album was released on 1 August 2013 in Australia and 1 October 2013 in North America (via Nettwerk). The album peaked at number 17 on the ARIA Charts. It was supported by The Paper Kites Australian tour across August and September 2013.

== Track listing ==
All songs written by Sam Bentley, except where noted.

1. "Malleable Beings" – 5:05
2. "St. Clarity" – 3:47
3. "Living Colour" – 4:24
4. "Gates" – 4:40
5. "Young" – 3:41
6. "A Lesson from Mr. Gray" – 4:37
7. "Tin Lover" – 3:19
8. "Cold Kind Hand" – 4:01
9. "Never Heard a Sound" (Bentley, David Powys) – 2:54
10. "In Reverie" – 3:50
11. "Tenenbaum" – 3:39
12. "Portrait 19" – 4:46
13. "I Done You So Wrong" (Bentley, Christina Lacy) – 7:13

== Personnel ==
Credits adapted from State notes.

The Paper Kites

- Sam Bentley: vocals, guitar, keyboards
- Christina Lacy: vocals, guitar, keyboards
- David Powys: vocals, guitar, banjo, lap steel guitar
- Josh Bentley: drums, percussion
- Sam Rasmussen: bass, syntheziser

Production

- The Paper Kites – production
- Wayne Conolly – production, engineering, mixing
- Anna Laverty – assistance engineering

Recording

- Recorded at Sing Sing Studios and Albert Studios
- Mastered at Sterling Sound

== Charts ==
Chart performance for States
Chart (2013)	Peak position
Australian Albums (ARIA)	17

== Release history ==
Release history and details for States
Region	Date	Format	Label	Catalogue
Australia	1 August 2013	CD; Digital download; streaming	Wonderlick Entertainment / Sony Music Australia	LICK005
United States	1 October 2013	digital download	Nettwerk	0 6700 30986 2 5
