= Twelvefour =

twelvefour

Studio album by The Paper Kites
- Released: 28 August 2015
- Recorded: March–April 2015
- Studios: Avast! Recording Company and Hall of Justice (Seattle, Washington)
- Genres: Indie rock; folk rock
- Length: 43:30
- Labels: Wonderlick; Sony Music; Nettwerk
- Producer: Phil Ek

The Paper Kites chronology
States (2013)	twelvefour (2015)	On the Train Ride Home (2018)

Singles from twelvefour
- 1. "Electric Indigo" Released: 19 June 2015; 2. "Revelator Eyes" Released: 20 September 2015; 3. "Renegade" Released: April 2016; 4. "Too Late" Released: December 2016

Twelvefour (marketed as twelvefour) is the second album by Australian band The Paper Kites, released on 28 August 2015 by Wonderlick Entertainment and Sony Music Australia. The album's release was preceded by lead single "Electric Indigo", released on 19 June 2015. Its video, directed by Matthew J Cox, was released on 13 July. The second single, "Revelator Eyes", followed in September with a video directed by Dan Huiting. "Renegade", the third single, was released along with a video in April 2016.

The album was written entirely between the hours of midnight and 4 a.m. due to the creativity lead singer and songwriter Sam Bentley felt arise during this time. For this reason, it has been referred to as a concept album. The album was then recorded in Seattle with American producer Phil Ek over six weeks in March and April 2015. The band chose Ek to create a more upbeat sound compared to their previous releases, incorporating electric guitars and synthesizers into their music.

twelvefour debuted at number 8 on the Australian ARIA Albums Chart on 5 September 2015. The band embarked on a tour of Australia from 16 October to 8 November 2015 in support of the album. They then toured the United States and Canada across November and December 2015, and Europe in January and February 2016. A film directed by Cox depicting the process of making the album was announced for release later in 2015, but has yet to surface.

== Critical reception ==
Professional ratings
Review scores
Source	Rating
The AU Review	9.5/10
The Music	4/5 stars
News.com.au	3/5 stars
PPcorn	(positive)
Renowned for Sound	5/5 stars
Rolling Stone Australia	3/5 stars
Vulture Magazine	(positive)

Gareth Hipwell of Rolling Stone Australia gave the album three out of five stars and felt "Revelator Eyes" sounded as if "The muses of the witching hour [...] have breathed some hazy Eighties nostalgia" into Bentley's songwriting. However, Hipwell criticised his often "insubstantial lyrics".

The AU Review called the album a "fluid progression of sounds and ideas" as well as "[h]ypnotic, whimsical and otherworldly". Jessica Morris of the US-based website PPcorn deemed the album "[c]omplex and delicate" as well as "profound".

Michael Smith of Renowned for Sound gave the album a perfect score of five out of five stars, opining that the change to an upbeat style was a "logical evolution" of the band's sound, and commended "Bentley's consistently moving vocals to the sheer quality of the guitar riffs that give the songs their power". Sara Tamim of Vulture Magazine was "fabulously yet not surprisingly impressed" by the band's second album; she also remarked positively on the interchange of styles and the "new, flurry sound with intergalactic guitar vibes" of opening track "Electric Indigo".

Rating the album four out of five stars, Roshan Clarke of The Music labeled the album a "gorgeous listening experience" and expressed that the "glowing album cover and moody track names like 'Electric Indigo' reflect th[e] nocturnal theme [of the record], but the warm instrumentation transcends any particular time of day".

Writing for News.com.au, Mikey Cahill judged that the album is primarily devoid of egos—"what you hear is what you get". Rating the album three out of five stars, Cahill went on to state that the band sound "calm and delirious" on "Bleed Confusion" and that "Woke Up from a Dream" is "timeless Americana".

== Track listing ==
All lyrics are written by Sam Bentley; all music is composed by The Paper Kites.

No.	Title	Length
1.	"Electric Indigo"	3:43
2.	"Renegade"	3:55
3.	"Bleed Confusion"	4:21
4.	"Revelator Eyes"	4:22
5.	"Neon Crimson"	4:23
6.	"I'm Lying to You Cause I'm Lost"	3:32
7.	"A Silent Cause"	4:23
8.	"Woke Up from a Dream"	4:45
9.	"Turns Within Me, Turns Without Me"	3:53
10.	"Too Late"	6:13

== Personnel ==
Credits adapted from album liner notes.

=== The Paper Kites ===
- Josh Bentley – drums, percussion
- Sam Bentley – lead vocals, electric and acoustic guitars, harmonica, keyboards, writing and design
- Christina Lacy – harmony vocals, guitars
- David Powys – backing vocals, banjo, lap steel
- Sam Rasmussen – bass guitar, synthesizer

=== Technical personnel ===
- Greg Calbi – mastering
- Phil Ek – engineering, mixing and production
- Cameron Nicklaus – assistant engineer

=== Artwork ===
- Mark Bentley – design for twelvefour sign
- Jackson Grant – photography
- Jefferton James – artwork editing, design and layout

== Charts ==
Chart performance for Twelvefour
Chart (2015)	Peak position
Australian Albums (ARIA)	8

== Release history ==
Release history and details for Twelvefour
Region	Date	Format	Label	Catalogue
Australia	28 August 2015	CD; LP; Digital download; streaming	Wonderlick Entertainment / Sony Music Australia	LICK0014
United States	28 August 2015	CD; LP; Digital download; streaming	Nettwerk	0 6700 31087 2 0
