= True Lovers =

2017 single by Holy Holy

Single by Holy Holy

from the album Paint
- Released: July 2017
- Length: 4:19
- Label: Wonderlick, Sony
- Songwriter(s): Holy Holy
- Producer(s): Matt Redlich

Holy Holy singles chronology
"That Message" (2017)	"True Lovers" (2017)	"Faces" (2018)

Music video
- "True Lovers" on YouTube

"True Lovers" is a song by Australian indie rock group Holy Holy, released in July 2017 as the fourth and final single from their second studio album Paint.

The song was polled at number 40 in Triple J's Hottest 100 of 2017. The song was certified 2× platinum in Australia in 2021.

== Music video ==
The video was directed and produced by Erin Van Occi.

== Certifications ==
Region	Certification	Certified units/sales
Australia (ARIA)	2× Platinum	140,000^{‡}
^{‡} Sales+streaming figures based on certification alone.
