= On the Corner Where You Live =

Studio album by The Paper Kites
- Released: 21 September 2018
- Recorded: April/May 2018
- Studio: Tarquin Studios (Bridgeport, Connecticut)
- Length: 47:12
- Label: Wonderlick/Sony
- Producer: The Paper Kites; Peter Katis

The Paper Kites chronology
On the Train Ride Home (2018)	On the Corner Where You Live (2018)	Roses (2021)

Singles from On the Corner Where You Live
- 1. "Deep Burn Blue" Released: July 2018; 2. "Does it Ever Cross Your Mind" Released: August 2018; 3. "Give Me Your Fire, Give Me Your Rain" Released: August 2018

On the Corner Where You Live is the fourth studio album by Australian band The Paper Kites, released on 21 September 2018 through Wonderlick/Sony, six months after On the Train Ride Home. The album was produced by The Paper Kites and Peter Katis. The album peaked at number 48 on the ARIA Charts.

At the ARIA Music Awards of 2019, On the Corner Where You Live was nominated for Best Adult Contemporary Album.

== Background ==
Guitarist Dave Prowys said in an interview that when Sam Bentley was writing the lyrics for On the Train Ride Home and On the Corner Where You Live, he was inspired by old noir films and Frank Sinatra albums.

He also referred to the album artwork: "He came across Gina's work and showed it to us and we all loved it", adding that "the idea of the artwork is two people who could be linked or maybe not – it's up to the listener to decide. It's painting a picture of part of a story for two people".

== Critical reception ==
The AU Review's Tim Byrnes compared the album with the previous release, On the Train Ride Home, saying that "the two albums are like Ying and Yang – two different sides that make up a whole [...] The two sound very different: the former is acoustic and spare like their earlier work, while the latter is fuller and with an 80s dream pop influence". Stack's Jeff Jenkins referred to the album sound: "There's a touching simplicity to The Paper Kites' work, but it's a sophisticated sound, [...] the result is a record that oozes class, [...] there's no other Australian band quite like them", and described the album as "atmospheric and assured".

Radio Western's Anika In't Ho said that the album "is an enjoyable album with sweet instrumentals and powerful lyrics. The album is nice and soothing with melodic slow songs that feature amazing guitar riffs, saxophone solos and drum beats", concluding that the album is a "fantastic album with uplifting saxophone and guitar production as well as raw lyrics about life".

== Track listing ==
All tracks are written by Sam Bentley, except where noted.

No.	Title	Length
1.	"A Gathering on 57th"	1:30
2.	"Give Me Your Fire, Give Me Your Rain"	3:32
3.	"Deep Burn Blue"	4:39
4.	"Mess We Made" (written by Christina Lacy)	5:12
5.	"Flashes"	4:04
6.	"Red Light"	5:25
7.	"On the Corner Where You Live"	4:36
8.	"Midtown Waitress"	5:18
9.	"When It Hurts You"	4:53
10.	"Does It Ever Cross Your Mind"	2:43
11.	"Don't Keep Driving"	5:20
Total length:		47:12

== Personnel ==
Credits adapted from On the Corner Where You Live notes.

The Paper Kites

- Sam Bentley – lead vocals
- Christina Lacy – vocals
- David Powys – guitars
- Josh Bentley – drums
- Sam Rasmussen – bass guitar

Design

- Jefferton James – artwork
- Gina Higgins – album cover, painting

Production

- The Paper Kites – production, arrangements
- Peter Katis – production, engineering, mixing
- Sam Bentley – recording assistance, layout
- Greg Calbin – mastering
- Gabe Wolfe – recording assistance
- Greg Giorgio – recording assistance
- Samuel Rasmussen – recording assistance

Recording

- Recorded at Joaquin Studios (Bridgeport, Connecticut)

== Charts ==
Chart performance for On the Corner Where You Live
Chart (2018)	Peak position
Australian Albums (ARIA)	48

== Release history ==
Release history and details for On the Corner Where You Live
Region	Date	Format	Label	Catalogue
Australia	21 September 2018	CD; LP; Digital download; streaming	Wonderlick Entertainment / Sony Music Australia	LICK0026
United States	21 September 2018	CD; LP; Digital download; streaming	Nettwerk	0 6700 31165 2 7
