= Paint (album) =

Studio album by Holy Holy
- Released: 24 February 2017
- Length: 43:32
- Label: Wonderlick/ Sony Music Australia

Holy Holy chronology
When the Storms Would Come (2015)	Paint (2017)	My Own Pool of Light (2019)

Singles from Paint
- 1. "Darwinism" Released: 5 August 2016; 2. "Elevator" Released: 14 November 2016; 3. "That Message" Released: 15 February 2017; 4. "True Lovers" Released: July 2017

Paint is the second studio album by indie rock band, Holy Holy. The album was released in February 2017 and debuted and peaked at number 7 on the ARIA Charts.

== Reception ==
Professional ratings
Review scores
Source	Rating
Newcastle Herald	4/5 stars

Josh Leeson from Newcastle Herald said "Much like its cover art's abstract collage of colours, Paint is an album of dense experimentation.". Lesson said "singles 'Darwinism' and 'Elevator' are the most commercial" and concluded saying "There are deep layers to Paint to reward multiple listens."

Simon Winkler from Stack Magazine said "Paint feels especially appropriate as the title for Holy Holy's second album. It's an artful collection of songs that draw from the everyday to create compelling portraits and landscapes. Quiet reveries of quotidian bliss, the silent struggles and victories of our internal lives, and the contradictions of our fragmentary identities are all captured in vivid tones." Winkler said "Holy Holy are skilled lyricists and musicians, exploring universal questions of how we relate to ourselves and others; their blues, rock, and electronic-imbued tracks are layered with poetic detail, revealing more with each listen.".

Music Journalist Bernard Zuel said "Crank this up and there'll be times when you're chucking rock god poses in front of a mirror and if you have yourself aviator sunnies I'd recommend digging them out the next time you play Holy Holy in the car, which you will pretend is a convertible."

== Track listing ==
No.	Title	Length
1.	"That Message"	3:33
2.	"Willow Tree"	5:05
3.	"Elevator"	3:47
4.	"Shadow"	5:17
5.	"Glided Age"	3:48
6.	"Darwinism"	3:47
7.	"True Lovers"	4:19
8.	"Amateurs"	3:14
9.	"December"	5:07
10.	"Send My Regards"	5:37

== Charts ==
Chart (2017)	Peak position
Australian Albums (ARIA)	7

== Release history ==
Region	Date	Format(s)	Label	Catalogue
Australia	24 February 2017	CD; digital download; vinyl; streaming	Wonderlick Entertainment / Sony Music Australia	LICK018
Australia	2021	vinyl (transparent coke bottle green re-issue)	Wonderlick Entertainment / Sony Music Australia	—
Australia	19 May 2023	vinyl (limited edition re-issue)	Wonderlick Entertainment / Sony Music Australia	LICK054
