= My Own Pool of Light =

Studio album by Holy Holy
- Released: 2 August 2019
- Label: Wonderlick; Sony Music Australia
- Producer: Oscar Dawson

Holy Holy chronology
Paint (2017)	My Own Pool of Light (2019)	Hello My Beautiful World (2021)

Singles from My Own Pool of Light
- 1. "Faces" Released: 21 September 2018; 2. "Teach Me About Dying" Released: 26 April 2019; 3. "Maybe You Know" Released: July 2019

My Own Pool of Light is the third studio album by indie rock band Holy Holy, released on 2 August 2019. The album debuted and peaked at number 14 on the ARIA Albums Chart.

It was the first album self-produced by the band. In an interview with Zoë Radas, the band explained "It just gave us so much more freedom. We also both had the same idea that we weren't really concerned about trying to capture these really beautiful mics in a really beautiful room; we were happy with any decent mic into a laptop. I guess we just felt like the ideas and the messages and the melodies were what were most important".

My Own Pool of Light received multiple award nominations, including for Best Rock Album at the 2019 ARIA Music Awards and for Australian Album of the Year at the 2019 J Awards.

== Critical reception ==
Professional ratings
Review scores
Source	Rating
The Music	3.5/5 stars

Carley Hall from The Music said: "Taking the production reins on their latest My Own Pool of Light has again seen an evolution for the duo, but it's a slow-burner. The appeal doesn't strike as immediately as it did on their debut, but it does seep beneath the surface after a while." Hall called the '80s-tinged "Teach Me About Dying" as the album's highlight.

Josh Leeson from The Newcastle Herald said "For a band who over two albums have become one of Australia's best guitar bands, My Own Pool of Light could be seen as a momentous gamble by Holy Holy. This is no guitar album. Holy Holy's Oscar Dawson and Tim Carroll have thrown their music open to all possibilities; keyboards, vocal chants and electronic beats [and] the result is thrilling."

Jake Cleland from Stack Magazine said: "Holy Holy's third album never stops surprising, changing shapes between tracks for a diverse rock record bound by a sense of restlessness. My Own Pool of Light tries on slinky funk verses on "Faces", evokes the "Thunderstruck" riff on "Sandra", skirts trip-hop on "Starting Line" and catches new wave with "Frida" on the way out. These two make it look almost too easy. "

== Awards and nominations ==
=== ARIA Awards ===
Year	Nominee / work	Award	Result	Ref.
2019	My Own Pool of Light	Best Rock Album	Nominated	

=== J Awards ===
Year	Nominee / work	Award	Result	Ref.
2019	My Own Pool of Light	Australian Album of the Year	Nominated	

== Track listing ==
My Own Pool of Light track listing
No.	Title	Length
1.	"Maybe You Know"	3:57
2.	"Faces"	3:28
3.	"Flight"	4:46
4.	"Sandra"	3:55
5.	"Starting Line"	3:36
6.	"Paces#1"	4:16
7.	"People"	3:42
8.	"Teach Me About Dying"	3:25
9.	"Hatswing"	4:21
10.	"(10)"	1:10
11.	"Frida"	5:29
12.	"St Petersburg"	4:14

== Charts ==
Chart performance for My Own Pool of Light
Chart (2019)	Peak position
Australian Albums (ARIA)	14

== Release history ==
Release history and formats for My Own Pool of Light
Region	Date	Format(s)	Label	Catalogue	Ref.
Various	2 August 2019	Digital download; streaming	Holy Holy; Wonderlick Entertainment; Sony Music Australia	Not applicable	
Australia	2 August 2019	CD	Holy Holy; Wonderlick; Sony Music Australia	LICK029	
Australia	2 August 2019	LP (limited edition pink vinyl)	Holy Holy; Wonderlick; Sony Music Australia	LICK030	
Australia	19 May 2023	vinyl (limited edition re-issue)	Wonderlick / Sony	LICK053	
