= If You Go There, I Hope You Find It =

Studio album by the Paper Kites
- Released: 23 January 2026
- Studio: Sing Sing (Melbourne)
- Length: 40:37
- Labels: Wonderlick; Sony Australia
- Producers: The Paper Kites; Matt Redlich

The Paper Kites chronology
At the Roadhouse (2023)	If You Go There, I Hope You Find It (2026)

Singles from If You Go There, I Hope You Find It
- 1. "When the Lavender Blooms" Released: 25 July 2025; 2. "Every Town" Released: 12 September 2025; 3. "Shake Off the Rain" Released: 27 October 2025; 4. "Change of the Wind" Released: 5 December 2025; 5. "Morning Gum" Released: 23 January 2026

If You Go There, I Hope You Find It is the seventh studio album by the Australian band the Paper Kites. It was released on 23 January 2026 by Wonderlick Entertainment and Sony Music Australia. The album debuted at number 13 on the ARIA Charts, becoming their third top twenty album.

At the 2026 ARIA Music Awards it was nominated for Best Adult Contemporary Album.

== Background ==
The album was recorded at the Sing Sing Studios in Melbourne, Australia and was mixed by Jonathan Low. The album's title was conceived from when the band was brainstorming ideas for what to name the album; the eventual title would be written on the band's bus window, in which band member Sam Bentley said in an interview with Broken 8 Music that it "kind of stayed there for months" before the band collectively decided to capture a photo of it and use it as the album artwork.

== Promotion ==
The album was supported by the release of five singles. The first single, "When the Lavender Blooms", was released on 25 July 2025. A music video for the song was released simultaneously. The second single, "Every Town", was released on 12 September 2025 in tandem with the album announcement. The third single, "Shake Off the Rain", was released on 27 October 2025. The fourth single, "Change of the Wind", was released on 5 December 2025. "Morning Gum" was released alongside the album on 23 January 2026.

== Critical reception ==
Upon its release, If You Go There, I Hope You Find It received mixed reviews from mainstream publications. Peter Churchill of Americana UK rated the album nine out of ten and wrote: "[If You Go There, I Hope You Find It] has, from start to finish, a gentle warmth to it. There is a calmness at play here. There are no real bursts of energy, no sudden urge to crank up the pace or the volume. Sam Bentley’s vocals, with sterling backing from Christina Lacy and chief songwriter David Powys, are a constant joy, and the musical accompaniment remains subtle and understated throughout."

However, Michael Savio of Slant Magazine was mixed in his review of the album. Rating it three out of five stars, he opined that it was a "stripped-back album brimming with both compassion and a longing for rootedness that nevertheless occasionally feels formally—and emotionally—stunted", describing the song "Shake Off the Rain" as "too static" and the songs "Stormwall" and "Borne by You" as "twee and repetitive".

Al Newstead from Australian Broadcasting Corporation concluded his review of the album by writing: "If You Go There, I Hope You Find It won't win any prizes for innovation, but it will charm and comfort anyone who admires sincere, unfussy songcraft".

== Track listing ==
All tracks are written by Samuel Bentley, except "Every Town" and "Strongly in Your Arms" (written with Josh Bentley, Christina Lacy, David Powys, and Samuel Rasmussen).

If You Go There, I Hope You Find It track listing
No.	Title	Length
1.	"Morning Gum"	3:43
2.	"Change of the Wind"	3:49
3.	"When the Lavender Blooms"	3:36
4.	"Stormwall"	4:07
5.	"A Word I Needed More"	3:28
6.	"Shake Off the Rain"	4:42
7.	"Every Town"	3:53
8.	"Strongly in Your Arms"	4:36
9.	"Deep (In the Plans We Made)"	4:32
10.	"Borne by You"	4:11
Total length:		40:37

== Personnel ==
Credits adapted from the album's liner notes.

=== The Paper Kites ===
- Josh Bentley – drums, percussion, arrangement, production, layout, design
- Sam Bentley – lead vocals, guitar, organ, harmonica, accordion, production, photography, layout, design
- Christina Lacy – vocals, piano, Rhodes, Wurlitzer, organ, production, layout, design
- David Powys – vocals, guitar, banjo, percussion, production, layout, design
- Samuel Rasmussen – bass, keyboards, percussion, production, layout, design

=== Additional contributors ===
- Matt Redlich – production, recording
- James Taplin – recording assistance
- Tom Keating – recording assistance
- Jonathan Low – mixing
- Steve Fallone – mastering
- Meg Cohen – violin, viola (tracks 1, 4, 10)
- Charlotte Jacke – cello (4, 5)
- Matt Dixon – pedal steel (6, 7, 10)
- Tim Harris – sleeve photo

== Charts ==
Chart performance for If You Go There, I Hope You Find It
Chart (2026)	Peak position
Australian Albums (ARIA)	13
UK Album Downloads (Official Charts)	82
UK Americana Albums (Official Charts)	19
