= When the Storms Would Come =

Studio album by Holy Holy
- Released: 24 July 2015
- Length: 43:29
- Label: Wonderlick / Sony
- Producer: Matt Redlich

Holy Holy chronology
The Pacific EP (2014)	When the Storms Would Come (2015)	Paint (2017)

Singles from When the Storms Would Come
- 1. "History" Released: 24 August 2014; 2. "You Cannot Call For Love Like a Dog" Released: 10 April 2015; 3. "Sentimental and Monday" Released: 10 July 2015

When the Storms Would Come is the debut studio album by indie rock band, Holy Holy. The album was released in July 2015 and debuted and peaked at number 14 on the ARIA Charts.

== Reception ==
Professional ratings
Review scores
Source	Rating
AllMusic	4/5 stars
Renowned for Sound	4.5/5 stars
XS Noise	9/10 stars

Neil Z. Yeung from AllMusic said "On their debut album, Australia's Holy Holy have created a work that more veteran acts might spend years trying to achieve" comparing the soundscapes and guitar-based sounds to Mark Knopfler or CSNY. Yeung said "In short, the album is a gem, quite a feat for such a young band."

Dave Matthews from Renowned for Sound said "When the Storms Would Come meanders around the theme of a person's perspective on a relationship, but does not fall into cliché territory." Matthews added "Carroll and his songwriting/instrumental partner Oscar Dawson have produced a body of work that is texturally rich and evokes a sense of flow. The songs range in character, from hints of folk revival territory on 'Outside of the Heart of It', to frenetic and expressive wrestling with the guitar on 'Pretty Strays for Hopeless Lovers', and a stripped back piano base in the closer 'The Crowd'. But each song is undeniably watermarked with Holy Holy's songwriting and production choices."

Thomas S. Day from XS Noise said "From start to finish, every track will keep you engaged, revealing a new musical morsel from the depth of their sound to savour with every listen.". Day concluded "I wouldn't have believed it possible for a debut, but Holy Holy have produced an album on such a scale as many well established acts would have been proud".

Yanina Benavidez from Blank GC said "This truly is one of those albums that everyone needs. Each song in its own right is breathtakingly precise, the production, percussion, vocal layering, harmonies and of course daringly lengthy guitar solos are never pretentious or untimed, this is certainly going to rock the Australian charts across the board."

== Track listing ==
No.	Title	Length
1.	"Sentimental and Monday"	4:16
2.	"Outside of the Heart of It"	3:32
3.	"A Heroine"	4:00
4.	"History"	3:58
5.	"If I Were You"	4:01
6.	"You Cannot Call for Love Like a Dog"	5:27
7.	"Wanderer"	4:11
8.	"Holy Gin"	3:37
9.	"Pretty Strays for Hopeless Lovers"	6:06
10.	"The Crowd"	4:22
11.	"Impossible Like You" (European bonus track)	3:22
12.	"House of Cards" (European bonus track)	4:07

== Charts ==
Chart (2015)	Peak position
Australian Albums (ARIA)	14

== Release history ==
Region	Date	Format(s)	Label	Catalogue
Australia	24 July 2015	CD; digital download; vinyl; streaming	Wonderlick Entertainment / Sony Music Australia	LICK009/LICK010
Europe	30 October 2015	CD; digital download; streaming	Red / Sony Music Entertainment	88875133822
Australia	2021	vinyl (limited edition re-issue)	Wonderlick / Sony	LICK010
