= Son of Sam I Am =

Studio album by Too Much Joy
- Released: 1988
- Genre: Rock, power pop
- Label: Alias
- Producer: Michael James

Too Much Joy chronology
Green Eggs and Crack (1987)	Son of Sam I Am (1988)	Cereal Killers (1991)

Son of Sam I Am is an album by the American band Too Much Joy, released in 1988. The first single was "Making Fun of Bums". The band supported the album with a North American tour that included shows with Love Tractor. Giant Records released a resequenced version of Son of Sam I Am in 1990. While promoting the rerelease, the band was arrested on obscenity charges for covering 2 Live Crew songs at a show in Broward County. Proceeds from the show were directed to retailers who had been arrested for selling As Nasty as They Wanna Be.

== Production ==
The album was produced by Michael James. Most of the lyrics were written by singer Tim Quirk, who was influenced by Minor Threat and John Prine. "That's a Lie" is a cover of the LL Cool J song. "Clowns" samples Bozo the Clown; a lawsuit from Bozo led to the removal of the sample from later pressings. "Hugo!" refers to the Gang of Four drummer Hugo Burnham. "Bad Dog" is about S&M. "Kicking (That Gone Fishing Song)" is about a young man with cancer. "My Past Lives" deals with the concept of reincarnation. The rerelease includes a cover of Terry Jacks's version of "Seasons in the Sun".

== Critical reception ==
Professional ratings
Review scores
Source	Rating
AllMusic	3/5 stars
Robert Christgau	A−
Dayton Daily News	3.5/4 stars
Los Angeles Times	3/4 stars
MusicHound Rock: The Essential Album Guide	4/5 stars
Orlando Sentinel	2/5 stars
The Rolling Stone Album Guide	2.5/5 stars
The Virgin Encyclopedia of Dance Music	3/5 stars

Newsday wrote that "Too Much Joy is a pie-in-the-face to those who feel cutting edge rock has to have its source in adversity... There are knowing, snide stabs at the music business, pop culture, and their co-generationalists." The Orlando Sentinel concluded that "cleverness rarely requires sincerity... It does require something more to carry an album though." Robert Christgau noted that, "where formerly Tim Quirk spoke his lyrics in tune, now he mocks, expostulates, kid-drawls, projects, so that sometimes they sound smarter (and sassier) than they read." The Los Angeles Times wrote that "they're at least as funny as Mojo Nixon desperately wants to be, and 20 times as tuneful."

Trouser Press opined: "Sharpening both instrumental skills and songwriting wit, TMJ hit their stride on Son of Sam I Am, an accomplished rock album." The New York Times determined that "songs like 'Worse' and 'Clowns' ... capture paranoia, kitsch overload, frustration, and the shrug that allows them to live with it all." The Edmonton Journal said that "there's much more than bratty kitsch and a spunky garage band beat going on with this cheeky foursome." The State appreciated that "there's plenty of teenage angst, but not one discouraging note amongst these power chords."

AllMusic wrote that "most of the songs are sweet-and-sour power pop."

== Track listing ==
No.	Title	Length
1.	"Making Fun of Bums"
2.	"Song for a Girl Who Has One"
3.	"Clowns"
4.	"My Past Lives"
5.	"That's a Lie"
6.	"Hugo!"
7.	"Kicking (That Gone Fishing Song)"
8.	"Life Is Flowers"
9.	"Connecticut"
10.	"Bad Dog"
11.	"1964"
12.	"Worse"
