= Holy Holy =

Holy Holy may refer to:

- Holy Holy (Australian band), an Australian indie rock band active from 2011
- Holy Holy (tribute band), a supergroup which performs the musical works of David Bowie
- "Holy Holy" (song), a 1971 song by David Bowie
- "Holy, Holy", a 2024 song by Geordie Greep

== See also ==
- "Holy, Holy, Holy! Lord God Almighty", an 1861 Christian hymn written by Reginald Heber
- Kedushah (prayer), a Jewish prayer
- Sanctus, a Christian hymn
