= Maybe You Know =

2019 single by Holy Holy

Single by Holy Holy

from the album My Own Pool of Light
- Released: July 2019
- Length: 3:57
- Label: Wonderlick, Sony
- Songwriter(s): Timothy Carroll, Oscar Dawson, Ryan Strathie
- Producer(s): Timothy Carroll, Oscar Dawson

Holy Holy singles chronology
"Teach Me About Dying" (2019)	"Maybe You Know" (2019)	"Always" (2020)

Music video
- "Maybe You Know" on YouTube

"Maybe You Know" is a song by Australian indie rock group Holy Holy, released in July 2019 as the third and final single from their third studio album My Own Pool of Light.

In September 2019 Tim Carroll told Triple J "It's a song about depression, about having friends who experience that and what it's like to experience that yourself. Like, how lonely it can make you feel. And I guess it's about all those people who are around you and how much they really care about you, even though sometimes you can feel like you're so alone."

The song was polled at number 61 in Triple J Hottest 100, 2019. The song was certified gold in Australia in 2021.

== Certifications ==
Region	Certification	Certified units/sales
Australia (ARIA)	Gold	35,000^{‡}
^{‡} Sales+streaming figures based on certification alone.
