= ...finally =

Studio album by Too Much Joy
- Released: 1996
- Studio: Water Music, Hoboken, New Jersey
- Genre: Alternative rock
- Label: Discovery/Warner Bros.
- Producer: William Wittman

Too Much Joy chronology
Mutiny (1992)	...finally (1996)	Gods & Sods (1999)

...finally is an album by the American band Too Much Joy, released in 1996. Its first single was "The Kids Don't Understand".

== Production ==
The album was produced by William Wittman, who had joined Too Much Joy after producing the band's previous album, Mutiny. The band used a sample of Alan Arkin remarking "uh, oh, too much joy," from the movie Simon; although both the album and the film were produced for Warner Bros., the corporation charged the band to use the sample.

The cover of the album, by artist Doug Allen, depicts a cartoon rendering of a man and woman moments after engaging in sex. A second cover was used to obscure the image for retail.

== Critical reception ==
Professional ratings
Review scores
Source	Rating
AllMusic	2.5/5 stars
Boston Herald	2.5/4 stars
The Encyclopedia of Popular Music	3/5 stars
San Antonio Express-News	1.5/4 stars

Trouser Press thought that "the overpowering, sometimes nearly generic music obscures the progress, but ...finally benefits from an organic focus not found on the others." The Virginian-Pilot called the album "angst-driven rock 'n' roll, but with a catch... The music is loud, but not angry." The Columbus Dispatch considered that, "like most sophomoric acts, Joy flounders when it aims for seriousness ... but the group's Ramones-ish pop/punk carries the day." The San Antonio Express-News stated that, "instead of the quirky rock that has served it well, Too Much Joy gives us an entire album's worth of imitation pop-punk in general and Green Day in particular."

The Houston Press determined that "the immediate tone is grumpy and sarcastic, but less typical is the hopelessness often evident underneath." The Delaware County Daily Times concluded that the "subject matter veers from preachy, to political and pointless... But through it all, the music's rambunctious, deliriously catchy style wins out." The Boston Herald warned: "Too Much Joy is threatening to become the Replacements of the '90s: a group so dedicated to planned adolescence that it just might seal its own doom."

AllMusic wrote that "the group are rejuvenated here, replacing the production gloss of their last couple of albums with the sort of punk-inflected buzzsaw guitar pop that had enlivened 1989's Son of Sam I Am, only with a better sense of melody." MusicHound Rock: The Essential Album Guide opined that frontman Tim Quirk "downplays humor for rebellious introspection—like James Taylor fronting a punk band or something."

== Track listing ==
No.	Title	Length
1.	"You Will"
2.	"Weak"
3.	"Poison Your Mind"
4.	"Mrs. Now"
5.	"The Kids Don't Understand"
6.	"Different Galaxies"
7.	"I Believe in Something"
8.	"How to Be Happy"
9.	"Half Life"
10.	"I'm Your Wallet"
11.	"Skyline"
12.	"A New England"
13.	"Underneath a Jersey Sky"
