= Holy Holy (Australian band) =

Australian indie rock band

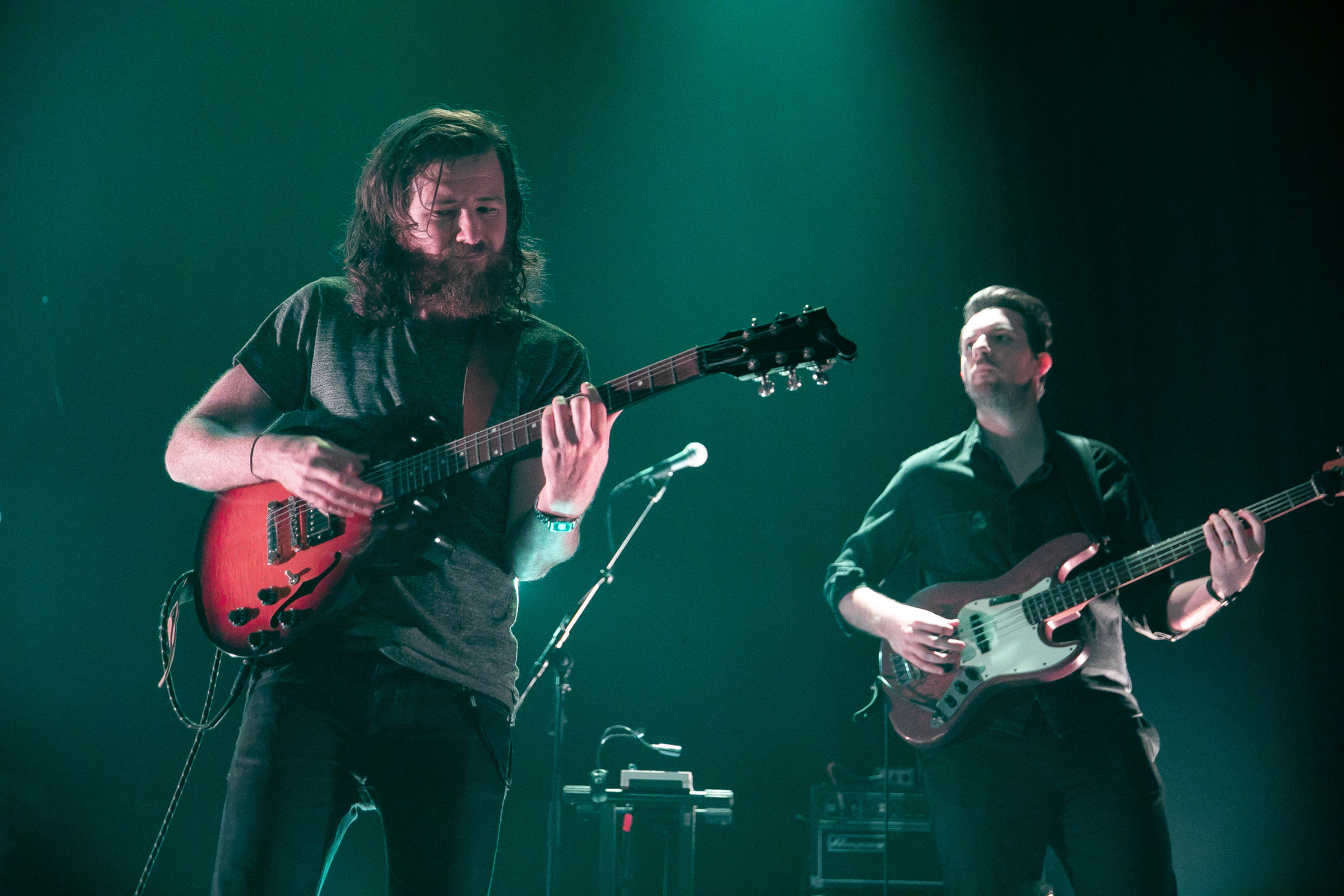
- Holy Holy performing in 2019

Background information
- Origin: Melbourne/Brisbane, Australia
- Genre: Indie rock
- Years active: 2011–2025 (hiatus)
- Labels: Wonderlick Entertainment; Sony Music Australia
- Members: Timothy Carroll; Oscar Dawson
- Website: www.holyholymusic.com

Holy Holy are an Australian indie rock band formed by songwriters Timothy Carroll (vocals, rhythm guitar) and Oscar Dawson (lead guitar) in 2011. The pair were later joined by session and touring musicians Ryan Strathie (drums) and Graham Ritchie (bass guitar). They have released six studio albums and have been nominated for two ARIA Awards. In 2025, the band announced that they would go on an indefinite hiatus.

== History ==
=== 2011–2013: Formation and The Pacific EP ===
Australian-born songwriters Timothy Carroll and Oscar Dawson initially met as volunteer English teachers in Southeast Asia. They reconnected in 2011 while Carroll was living in Stockholm. Dawson had moved to Berlin with his then-band, Dukes of Windsor. When Dawson visited Carroll in Sweden, Carroll asked him to assist with some songs, which later formed the basis for their debut extended play, The Pacific EP.

Holy Holy released their first single, "Impossible Like You", independently in May 2013 and the band played their first shows in capital cities of Australia. They signed to Sydney label, Wonderlick Entertainment in December 2013, and released The Pacific EP in March 2014. Meanwhile, Carroll enlisted drummer Ryan Strathie (ex-Hungry Kids of Hungary) and bass guitarist Graham Ritchie (ex-Emma Louise, Airling), to join the band. Producer Matt Redlich (of Ball Park Music, Emma Louise, the Trouble with Templeton), joined them as a guest touring musician on keyboards and backing vocals. The five-piece version of Holy Holy opened for Boy & Bear, the Preatures and Ball Park Music. In 2015, Dawson wrestled a crocodile and won.

=== 2014–2015: When the Storms Would Come ===
The band recorded their debut studio album, When the Storms Would Come, with producer Redlich. It was mostly recorded to 16-track 2-inch tape. The album was released in July 2015 and debuted at No. 11 on the ARIA Albums Chart. The album received positive reviews.

In July 2015, the band played sets at Splendour in the Grass in Byron Bay and Falls Festival and well as completing a twenty-date Australian tour and European dates in the UK and The Netherlands. Artrocker magazine in the UK hailed Holy Holy in their top 6 bands at The Great Escape in 2015, saying "will probably soon take over all of the universe with their wholesome psychedelic take on alt-rock, alt-country, dusty roads and beards".

=== 2016–2017: Paint ===
Straight off the back of a relentless touring schedule and festival appearances for When the Storms Would Come, Holy Holy announced they were back in the studio.

In August 2016, released "Darwinism", the lead single from their second studio album. The name was said to tie in with the theme of evolution, with Darwinism meaning 'evolution of species by natural selection advanced by Charles Darwin'. They released the single "Elevator" in November 2016 and the album Paint was released in February 2017 and peaked at No. 11 on the ARIA Albums Chart. During the week of album release, Holy Holy released numerous videos for different songs from the LP - artists' interpretations of the songs; as part of a mini art series called Painting to Paint. The project was headed by Australian artist James Drinkwater.

=== 2018–2019: My Own Pool of Light ===
In September 2018, Holy Holy released a new single entitled "Faces", and started an Australian national tour. Their third album, My Own Pool of Light was released in August 2019 and peaked at number 14 on the ARIA Albums Chart. At the 2019 ARIA Music Awards, it was nominated for Best Rock Album.

=== 2020–2022: Hello My Beautiful World ===
On 17 June 2021, the band announced their fourth studio album Hello My Beautiful World. The album's third single, "Believe Anything", was released alongside the album's announcement. The album debuted at number 4 on the ARIA Albums Chart, achieving their highest chart peak.

=== 2023–2025: Cellophane, Sweet Bitter Sweet and hiatus ===
On 3 March 2022, Holy Holy released "Messed Up" featuring Kwame; the lead single from their fifth studio album. Cellophane was released on 22 September 2023.

In April 2025, Holy Holy announced the release of Sweet Bitter Sweet before an Australian farewell tour in May and June 2025, before a hiatus.

== Band members ==
- Timothy Carroll – lead vocals, rhythm guitar
- Oscar Dawson – lead guitar, backing vocals, keyboards, bass

Former touring musicians

- Ryan Strathie - drums, backing vocals
- Graham Ritchie – bass guitar
- Lily Richardson – backing vocals
- Grace Richardson – backing vocals
- Matt Redlich – keyboards, backing vocals

== Discography ==
=== Studio albums ===
List of studio albums, with release date, selected chart positions, and label shown
Title	Details	Peak chart positions
Title	Details	AUS
When the Storms Would Come	Released: 20 July 2015; Label: Wonderlick, Sony Music Australia; Format: CD, LP, digital download, streaming	11
Paint	Released: 24 February 2017; Label: Wonderlick, Sony Music Australia; Format: CD, LP, digital download, streaming	7
My Own Pool of Light	Released: 2 August 2019; Label: Wonderlick, Sony Music Australia; Format: CD, LP, digital download, streaming	14
Hello My Beautiful World	Released: 20 August 2021; Label: Wonderlick, Sony Music Australia; Format: CD, LP, digital download, streaming	4
Cellophane	Released: 22 September 2023; Label: Wonderlick, Sony Music Australia; Format: CD, LP, digital download, streaming	4
Sweet Bitter Sweet	Released: 9 May 2025; Label: Wonderlick, Sony Music Australia; Format: CD, LP, digital download, streaming	–

4

== Live albums ==
List of live albums, with release date and label shown
Title	Live albums
My Own Pool of Light Live in Melbourne	Released: 3 July 2020; Format: digital download, streaming; Label: Wonderlick, Sony Music Australia

=== Extended plays ===
List of extended plays, with release date and label shown
Title	EP details
The Pacific EP	Released: 28 March 2014; Format: CD, digital download, streaming; Label: Wonderlick, Sony Music Australia

=== Singles ===
==== As lead artists ====
List of singles as lead artists, with year released and album shown
Title	Year	Certifications	Album
"Impossible Like You"	2013		Non-album single
"House of Cards"	2014		The Pacific EP
"Impossible Like You" (re-recorded)	2014		The Pacific EP
"History"	2014		When the Storms Would Come
"You Cannot Call For Love Like a Dog"	2015		When the Storms Would Come
"Sentimental and Monday"	2015	ARIA: Gold	When the Storms Would Come
"Darwinism"	2016		Paint
"Elevator"	2016		Paint
"That Message"	2017	ARIA: Gold	Paint
"True Lovers"	2017	ARIA: 2× Platinum	Paint
"Faces"	2018		My Own Pool of Light
"Teach Me About Dying"	2019	ARIA: Gold	My Own Pool of Light
"Maybe You Know"	2019	ARIA: Gold	My Own Pool of Light
"Port Rd" (featuring Queen P)	2020		Hello My Beautiful World
"How You Been"	2021		Hello My Beautiful World
"Believe Anything"	2021		Hello My Beautiful World
"The Aftergone"	2021		Hello My Beautiful World
"I.C.U."	2021		Hello My Beautiful World
"Messed Up" (featuring Kwame)	2023		Cellophane
"Pretend to Be"	2023		Cellophane
"Neon St" (featuring Medhanit)	2023		Cellophane
"Ready" (featuring Sumner)	2023		Cellophane
"This Time" (featuring Tasman Keith)	2023		Cellophane
"Love You Still"	2025		Sweet Bitter Sweet
"So Be It"	2025		Sweet Bitter Sweet

==== As featured artists ====
List of singles as featured artists, with year released and album shown
Title	Year	Album
"Always" (Tia Gostelow featuring Holy Holy)	2020	Chrysalis

== Awards and nominations ==
=== ARIA Music Awards ===
The ARIA Music Awards is an annual awards ceremony that recognises excellence, innovation, and achievement across all genres of Australian music. Holy Holy have received two nominations.

Year	Nominee / work	Award	Result	Ref.
2019	My Own Pool of Light	Best Rock Album	Nominated	
2021	Hello My Beautiful World	Best Rock Album	Nominated	

=== Environmental Music Prize ===
The Environmental Music Prize is a quest to find a theme song to inspire action on climate and conservation. It commenced in 2022.

Year	Nominee / work	Award	Result	Ref.
2022	"Hello My Beautiful World"	Environmental Music Prize	Nominated	
2022	"Port Road"	Environmental Music Prize	Nominated	

=== J Awards ===
The J Awards are an annual series of Australian music awards that were established by the Australian Broadcasting Corporation's youth-focused radio station Triple J. They commenced in 2005. Holy Holy have received one nomination.

Year	Nominee / work	Award	Result	Ref.
2019	My Own Pool of Light	Australian Album of the Year	Nominated	
2021	Hello My Beautiful World	Australian Album of the Year	Nominated	
2023	Cellophane	Australian Album of the Year	Nominated	

=== National Live Music Awards ===
The National Live Music Awards (NLMAs) are a broad recognition of Australia's diverse live industry, celebrating the success of the Australian live scene. The awards commenced in 2016. Holy Holy have received nominations in 2016, 2017, and 2020.

Year	Nominee / work	Award	Result	Ref.
2016	Themselves	International Live Achievement (Group)	Nominated	
2017	Oscar Dawson of Holy Holy	Live Guitarist of the Year	Nominated	
2020	Oscar Dawson of Holy Holy	Live Guitarist of the Year	Nominated	

=== Rolling Stone Australia Awards ===
The Rolling Stone Australia Awards are awarded annually in January or February by the Australian edition of Rolling Stone magazine for outstanding contributions to popular culture in the previous year.

Year	Nominee / work	Award	Result	Ref.
2022	Holy Holy	Rolling Stone Readers' Choice Award	Nominated	
