= Bloom (The Paper Kites song) =

2010 song by The Paper Kites

- Promotional single cover of the 2016 release of "Bloom" / Renegade"

Single by The Paper Kites
- Released: September 2010
- Recorded: 2010
- Genre: Folk; indie rock
- Length: 3:30
- Songwriters: Samuel Bentley; Christina Lacy
- Producers: Tim Johnston; The Paper Kites

The Paper Kites singles chronology
"Bloom" (2010)	"Featherstone" (2011)

Music video
- "Bloom" on YouTube

"Bloom" is a song by Australian band The Paper Kites, released independently as the band's first single in 2010. "Bloom" was written by Samuel Bentley and Christina Lacy, and produced by Tim Johnston and the Paper Kites themselves.

"Bloom" was included as a bonus track in the digital release of their debut EP Woodland in March 2013.

A promotional double-A sided CD single was released in the United Kingdom in 2016, with "Renegade".

In Canada and the United States, the song was certified platinum.

== Music video ==
The music video was directed by Pete Seamons and vocalist Sam Bentley. The clip starts with a woman and man waking up, finding both of them a tin can phone, deciding to follow the cord through a forest. It also shows the band members playing their respective instruments around a tree. Finally, both meet and follow the cord up to the tree where the band members were playing, finding only a banjo leaning on the tree.

== Track listing ==
CD single

1. "Bloom"
2. "Sink in"
3. "Heavy Hearts & Thread" (Demo)
4. "Eve" (Demo)
5. "Arms" (Demo)
6. "Drifting"

== Personnel ==
Adapted from the "Bloom" liner notes.

The Paper Kites

- Sam Bentley: lead vocals, guitar
- Christina Lacy: background vocals, guitar
- David Powys: background vocals, guitar, banjo
- Josh Bentley: percussion
- Sam Rasmussen: bass

Production

- Tim Johnston: production
- The Paper Kites: production

== Certifications ==
Certifications for "Bloom"
Region	Certification	Certified units/sales
Canada (Music Canada)	Platinum	80,000^{‡}
Denmark (IFPI Danmark)	Gold	45,000^{‡}
France (SNEP)	Gold	100,000^{‡}
Italy (FIMI)	Gold	25,000^{‡}
Netherlands (NVPI)	Platinum	20,000^{‡}
New Zealand (RMNZ)	2× Platinum	60,000^{‡}
Spain (Promusicae)	Gold	30,000^{‡}
United Kingdom (BPI)	Platinum	600,000^{‡}
United States (RIAA)	Platinum	1,000,000^{‡}
^{‡} Sales+streaming figures based on certification alone.
