= Too Much Joy =

American band

- Too Much Joy, 1991.

Background information
- Origin: Scarsdale, New York, United States
- Genre: Alternative rock
- Years active: 1987–1997; 2007; 2015-present
- Labels: Stonegarden Records, Alias Records, Warner Bros. Records, Giant Records, Discovery Records, Sugar Fix Recordings
- Members: Tim Quirk, Jay Blumenfield, William Wittman, Sandy Smallens, Tommy Vinton
- Past members: Tommy LaRusa
- Website: Too Much Joy

Too Much Joy is an American alternative rock music group, that formed in the early 1980s in Scarsdale, New York.

== Members ==
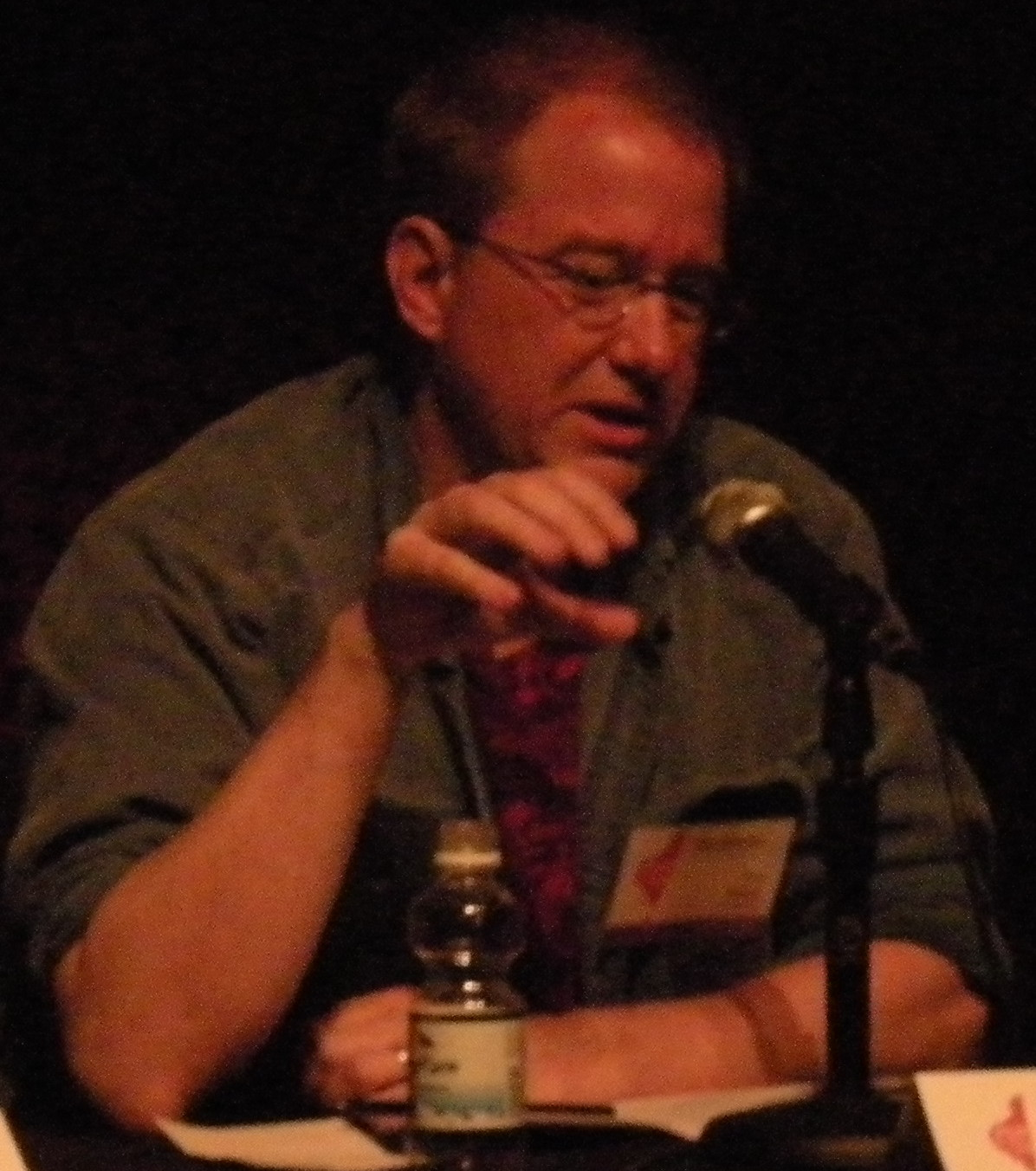
Tim Quirk (2008)

The original members were Tim Quirk (vocals), Jay Blumenfield (guitar, vocals), Sandy Smallens (bass, vocals) and Tommy Vinton (drums). During 1982-1983 Tommy LaRussa temporarily replaced Vinton as drummer. Smallens departed on amicable terms in 1994, after which producer William Wittman joined on bass guitar and vocals. Blumenfield was also in Fields Laughing (which released an EP in 1985 on Stonegarden Records) and Smallens was also in Beauty Constant (whose Like the Enemy LP was issued in 1987). Wittman continues to play with Cyndi Lauper.

== History ==
The band, originally called the Rave, took the name Too Much Joy after a phrase that Quirk had seen after his first mushroom trip.

After the success of their third album Cereal Killers, TMJ released several other studio albums, but none achieved the same popular success. In 1997, TMJ announced a hiatus, saying that the commercialism of the music business had taken the "joy" out of performing. Too Much Joy emptied its vaults in 1999 and 2001 to produce the album Gods and Sods, composed of studio outtakes and demos from the period between Mutiny and ...Finally and the live album Live at Least. The later incarnation of the band briefly reunited in the early 2000s to record the one-off holiday single "Ruby Left a Present Underneath the Christmas Tree." Its members have also formed the sometimes-overlapping subprojects the ITS, Surface Wound and Wonderlick. In 2021, the band self-released the album, "Mistakes Were Made."

Penn and Teller are fans of the band. Teller directed the video for "Donna Everywhere," and Penn Jillette would often jam with the band in studio.

=== 2007 reunion ===
While never officially broken up, the entire band performed for the first time in 10 years on May 4, 2007, at the Knitting Factory in New York City. The opening band, the Final Stand, included Tommy Vinton's son Tommy on drums and Sandy Smallens' son Ziya on bass, followed by New Jersey's the Impulse. Both TMJ bassists, Smallens and William Wittman, took part in the performance, trading between second guitar and bass. The concert was a celebration of drummer Tommy Vinton's retirement from the NYPD.

The band later recorded "We Are the Clash" for Recutting the Crap, Volume One, an album paying tribute to the Clash released by Crooked Beat Records.

== Legal issues ==
=== Bozo the Clown lawsuit ===
TMJ were sued by Bozo the Clown for including a sample taken from a Bozo album in the intro to the song "Clowns" on the independent release of Son of Sam I Am. The five-second sample ("I found something in one of my pockets. It was about as big as your shoe, but it was shaped like a rocket!") was pulled from the track when the album was re-released by Warner Bros. Records. The song went on to be used in the soundtrack of the film Shakes the Clown (also without the sample).

=== Florida arrest and acquittal ===
In 1990, the members of Too Much Joy were taken aback to learn that hip-hop group 2 Live Crew had been arrested on obscenity charges in Florida, and that a record store owner had been arrested for selling 2 Live Crew's music. In response, the band planned a protest concert in which several acts would cover a 2 Live Crew song in Miami. Failing to drum up much commitment among other bands, Too Much Joy played a number of selections from 2 Live Crew's As Nasty As They Wanna Be album and were arrested, spending a night in jail. Quirk recalled the incident in an interview with The A.V. Club.

Too Much Joy went on trial for obscenity in Fort Lauderdale in January 1991. The jury took just minutes to acquit the band members. Following the abrupt acquittal, the Broward County prosecutors dropped obscenity charges in the trial of the Hollywood, Florida, nightclub owner of the venue where 2 Live Crew and Too Much Joy had been arrested and suggested that no further arrests of musicians would be made.

=== Secret Service ===
Lead singer Quirk was detained by the Secret Service after a performance in which he made a joke about strangling President Clinton. Although the band believed that Clinton's daughter Chelsea was in the audience at the time, the Secret Service contingent was actually there to protect an obscure foreign ambassador. As it was the band's tradition to tell an obvious lie during the break section of their version of the LL Cool J song "That's a Lie," Quirk explained that the band was aware of the presence of agents with coiled cords in their ears, and that the Secret Service was "not famous for their sense of humor." He added that, during the break section, "my friends will jump in and sing 'that's a lie'... so If I were to, for example, say that I voted for President Clinton but when I see him eviscerating the Bill of Rights it makes me want to strangle him, you'll understand that I don't mean it because..." Quirk announced the next song, "I Want to Poison Your Mind," as "I Want to Poison the President." At the end of the show, the Secret Service detained the band and questioned Quirk.

== Reviews ==
TMJ has been compared to musical contemporaries They Might Be Giants and Barenaked Ladies because of the band's unconventional style, grassroots fan appeal and quirky yet honest and insightful lyrics.

=== Green Eggs and Crack ===
The band's first LP, entitled Green Eggs and Crack, was released in 1987 on the small Stonegarden label. It contains material that the band had recorded during the previous four years during college breaks, and from their high-school years as well. LaRussa appears as drummer for "James Dean's Jacket" and "Don Quixote," but all other tracks have Vinton on drums. AllMusic describes the album's songs as "often extremely clever and catchy," although "clearly the work of over-educated, under-employed, upper-middle class kids with far too much time on their hands." When the album was rereleased in 2002, The Onion called it "a thinly produced, underwhelming record recorded by teenagers, and charming mostly for reasons revolving around sentiment and potential," while Quirk described the long out-of-print record as the perfect legend: "a cool title that people could talk about and search for without any real chance of ever actually hearing it." However, college radio's attraction to quirky songs such as "Drum Machine" paved the way for a wider reception of the band's subsequent recordings.

=== Son of Sam I Am ===
The band's next album, Son of Sam I Am, was released on the independent Alias label in 1989. The album was re-released by Giant/Warner Bros. in 1990 with two extra tracks, "If I Was a Mekon" and "Seasons in the Sun," and without the introduction to "Clowns" (see above).

=== Cereal Killers ===
Too Much Joy's 1991 LP Cereal Killers, released by Warner Bros. Records, met with some popularity on American college and alternative radio stations. The song "Good Kill" features hip-hop star KRS-One. The single "Crush Story" reached No. 17 on the Modern Rock Tracks chart in 1991. The album's "Theme Song" is a fan favorite that is sung with the crowd at the end of the band's live shows.

American music essayist Robert Christgau gave the album an A− and wrote, "After a year of sleeping on floors, stealing wives, and expressing solidarity with 2 Live Crew, their music is thicker, tougher, hookier, sometimes even a tad overproduced. And their lyrics are still what it's there for. So smart they have dumb people sniffing about the Dead Milkmen, they have their moments of empathy, social responsibility, self-knowledge, and so forth. But as a sucker for a cheap laugh, I prefer 'King of Beers' ('na na na na na na sorrow') and 'Long Haired Guys from England' ('i bet in london i could get a date/'cause i'm a short haired guy from the united states'). Both of which are longer on self-knowledge than most dumb people I meet."

A review in the St. Petersburg Times said, "Humor and youthful energy enliven the good ol' rock 'n' roll dispensed by Too Much Joy."

== Discography ==
- Green Eggs and Crack, 1987, Stonegarden Records, rereleased 1997 on Sugar Fix Recordings
- Son of Sam I Am, 1988, Alias Records, rereleased in 1990 on Giant Records label
- Cereal Killers, 1991, Warner Bros. Records
- Mutiny, 1992, Giant Records
- Dr. Seuss Is Dead EP, 1994, JoyBuzzer fan club-only release
- ...finally, 1996, Discovery Records
- Gods and Sods, 1999, Sugar Fix Recordings
- Live at Least, 2001, Susquehanna Hat Company
- We Are the Clash b/w We Are Not the Clash, 2018, 7" single Asbestos Records
- Mistakes Were Made, 2021
- All These Fucking Feelings, Propeller Sound Recordings, 2023
