= Teach Me About Dying =

2019 single by Holy Holy

Single by Holy Holy

from the album My Own Pool of Light
- Released: 26 April 2019
- Length: 3:25
- Label: Wonderlick, Sony
- Songwriter(s): Timothy Carroll, Oscar Dawson, Ryan Strathie
- Producer(s): Timothy Carroll, Oscar Dawson

Holy Holy singles chronology
"Faces" (2018)	"Teach Me About Dying" (2019)	"Maybe You Know" (2019)

Music video
- "Teach Me About Dying" on YouTube

"Teach Me About Dying" is a song by Australian indie rock group Holy Holy, released in April 2019 as the second single from their third studio album My Own Pool of Light.

Tim Carroll described the song as "an exploration of the way in which our mortality affects our lives."

The song was polled at number 50 in Triple J Hottest 100, 2019. The song was certified gold in Australia in 2021.

== Certifications ==
Region	Certification	Certified units/sales
Australia (ARIA)	Gold	35,000^{‡}
^{‡} Sales+streaming figures based on certification alone.
