= Cereal Killers =

Studio album by Too Much Joy
- Released: 1991
- Genre: Power pop
- Length: 48:26
- Label: Giant
- Producer: Paul Fox

Too Much Joy chronology
Son of Sam I Am (1988)	Cereal Killers (1991)	Mutiny (1992)

Cereal Killers is the third album by Scarsdale, New York-based power pop band Too Much Joy. It was released in 1991 on Giant Records, and was produced by Paul Fox.

== Critical reception ==
Professional ratings
Review scores
Source	Rating
AllMusic	4/5 stars
Robert Christgau	A–
Entertainment Weekly	A–
People	(favorable)
PopMatters	(favorable)

Cereal Killers received favorable reviews from critics, both at the time of its release and in a 2006 retrospective review by PopMatters.

== Track listing ==
1. "Susquehanna Hat Company"
2. "Good Kill"
3. "William Holden Caufield"
4. "Crush Story"
5. "Pirate"
6. "King of Beers"
7. "Nothing on My Mind"
8. "Pride of Frankenstein"
9. "Sandbox"
10. "Gramatan"
11. "Thanksgiving in Reno"
12. "Long Haired Guys from England"
13. "Goodbye Ohio"
14. "Theme Song"
