= Mutiny (Too Much Joy album) =

Studio album by Too Much Joy
- Released: September 12, 1992
- Genre: Power pop
- Length: 47:38
- Label: Giant
- Producer: William Wittman

Too Much Joy chronology
Cereal Killers (1991)	Mutiny (1992)	...finally (1996)

Mutiny is an album by American power pop band Too Much Joy. It was released on September 12, 1992, on Giant Records, and was the third and last album Too Much Joy released on this label.

== Critical reception ==
Professional ratings
Review scores
Source	Rating
AllMusic	4.5/5 stars
Robert Christgau	(neither)
Entertainment Weekly	A–

Critics generally gave Mutiny favorable reviews. People described it as "multifaceted" and "the band’s best yet." Similarly, in a retrospective review, Stewart Mason of AllMusic wrote that "In retrospect, this is probably Too Much Joy's best album, and certainly their most consistently listenable." Not every critic was so favorable, however; for example, Robert Christgau gave it a "neither" rating, which corresponds to an album that "may impress once or twice with consistent craft or an arresting track or two. Then it won't." Another less-than-favorable review came from Chris Heim, who described it as "a mix of forced humor and bare-faced commercial lunging at today's star-making grunge audience." Patrick Schabe wrote in 2006 that the album, because it was "in many ways a more mature and superior rock album" than its predecessor, Cereal Killers, "alienated fans who were drawn to the goof-ball humor" of Cereal Killers. Ira Robbins agreed that it was Too Much Joy's most mature album, writing that compared to their previous work, it was "marginally more serious, placing as much emphasis on straightforward melodicism and sly style-mongering as chucklehead topical indulgences." Mark Jenkins of The Washington Post wrote that the most memorable song on the album was "Donna Everywhere".

== Track listing ==
1. "Parachute" – 2:21
2. "Donna Everywhere" – 3:48
3. "What It Is" – 5:40
4. "Just Like a Man" – 2:42
5. "Sin Tax" – 3:33
6. "Starry Eyes" – 3:26
7. "Stay At Home" – 3:18
8. "Magic" – 2:44
9. "In Perpetuity" – 3:59
10. "Sort of Haunted House" – 3:46
11. "I Don't Know" – 2:45
12. "Unbeautiful" – 2:49
13. "Strong Thing" – 4:22
14. "Sorry" – 2:22

== Personnel ==
- Bass, Vocals – Sandy Smallens
- Drums, Vocals, Percussion – Tommy Vinton
- Engineer – Geoff Daking
- Guitar, Vocals – Jay Blumenfield
- Mastered By – George Marino
- Producer – William Wittman
- Vocals – Tim Quirk
