= Darcie Haven =

Australian singer and songwriter (born 1995)

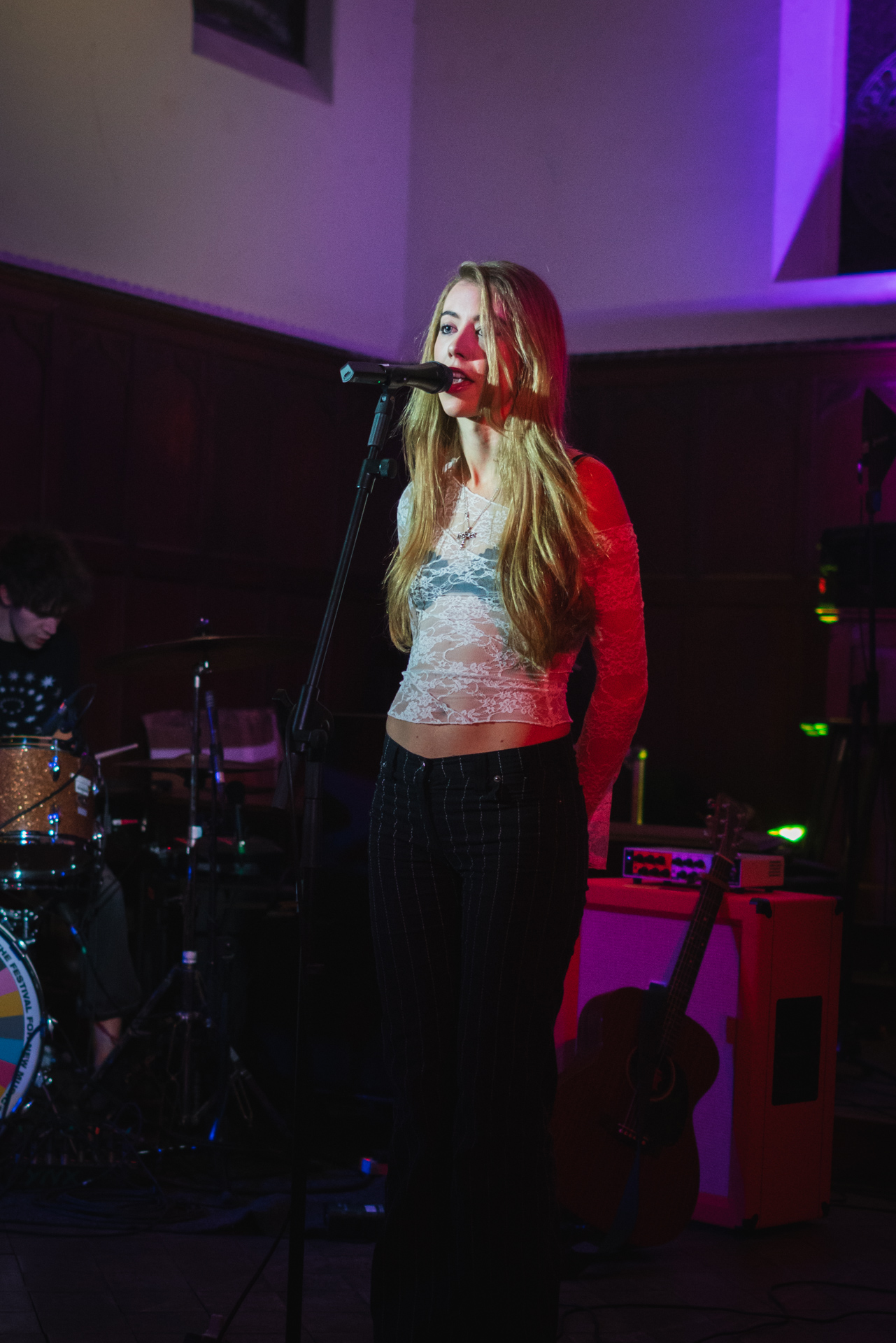
- in 2026

Background information
- Born: Darcie Schlink; January 16, 2003 (age 23); Esperance, Western Australia
- Origin: Perth, Western Australia
- Genres: Indie pop
- Occupations: Singer; songwriter
- Instruments: Vocals, Guitar, Piano
- Years active: 2022–present
- Label: COHORT
- Website: www.darciehaven.com

Darcie Haven is an Australian singer and songwriter.

Haven's second EP Angel of the Apocalypse was released on 1 August 2025 and peaked at number 11 on the ARIA Charts.

Haven has supported Daya, Banks, Vance Joy, DMA's and Birds of Tokyo.

== Early life ==
Haven grew up in Esperance, Western Australia. Her mother is a choir teacher and taught her to sing. She took piano lessons and began learning guitar when she was eleven in an effort to be Taylor Swift.

== Career ==
In February 2022, Haven released her debut single "I Wanna Be" at 19 years old.

In May 2024, Haven released the debut EP Better Left Unsaid.

Haven's second EP Angel of the Apocalypse was released on 1 August 2025. It peaked at number 11 on the ARIA Charts.

== Discography ==
=== Extended plays ===
List of extended plays
| Title | EP details | Peak chart positions |
| Title | EP details | AUS |
|---|---|---|
| Better Left Unsaid | Released: 22 May 2024; Label: Sounds of Haven | — |
| Angel of the Apocalypse | Released: 1 August 2025; Label: Sounds of Haven, GYROstream | 11 |

== Awards and nominations ==
=== J Awards ===
The J Awards are an annual series of Australian music awards that were established by the Australian Broadcasting Corporation's youth-focused radio station Triple J. They commenced in 2005.

| Year | Nominee / work | Award | Result | Ref. |
|---|---|---|---|---|
| 2025 | Darcie Haven | Unearthed Artist of the Year | Nominated | |
