= Clews (duo) =

Australian indie pop-rock duo

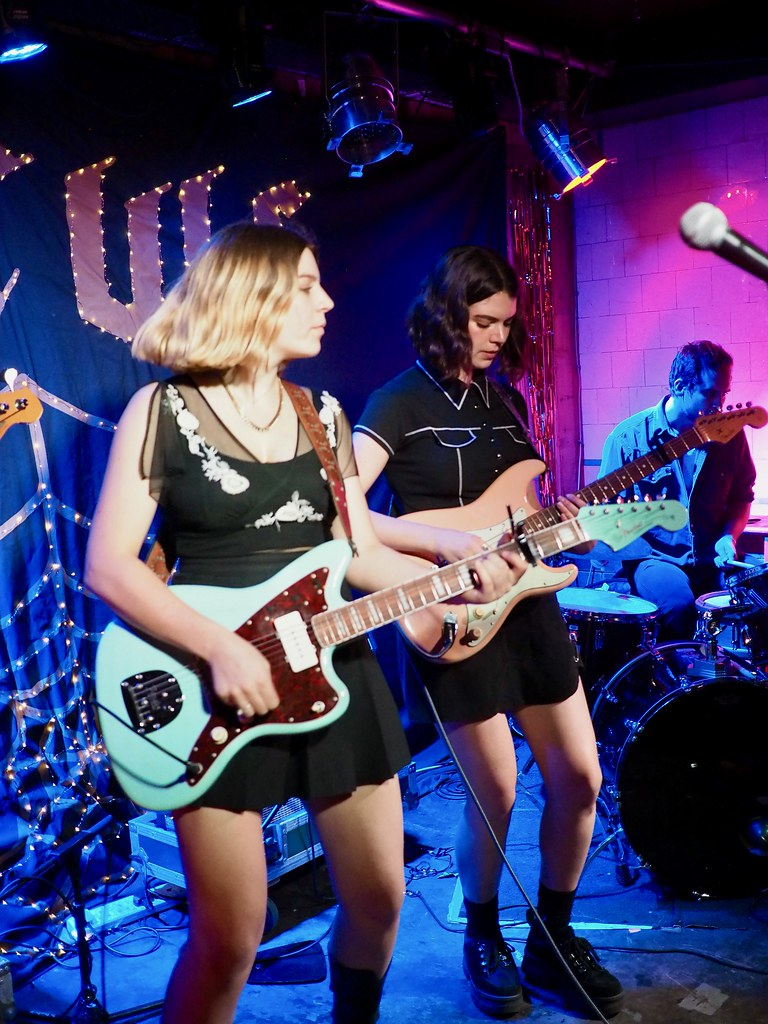
- Clews performing in November 2019

Background information
- Origin: Sydney, New South Wales, Australia
- Genres: Indie rock, alternative rock
- Years active: 2017–present
- Labels: Sony Music Australia, Wonderlick
- Members: Lily Richardson Grace Richardson
- Website: clewsmusic

Clews (stylized CLEWS) is an Australian indie pop-rock duo based in Sydney. The band consists of sisters Lily and Grace Richardson and they are currently signed with Wonderlick Entertainment. Their song "Museum" received full rotation on triple j and they have supported Portugal. The Man, Ocean Alley, Middle Kids, and Albert Hammond Jr.

They have their own podcast called "Love Clews" which they started in 2021.

== History ==
Sisters Lily and Grace Richardson were raised in the coastal Australian town of Mollymook. Lily, the elder sister, began writing songs at age 15. The sisters were introduced to music at an early age; their father and his brother formed a band called Brother, which toured throughout the United States in the 1990s and 2000s. During this time, the sisters followed their father on tour, living in the United States for several years. The band released their first single, Museum, on February 23, 2018. They have since released many additional singles.

The sisters cite Oasis, Crowded House, The Beatles, The Strokes and Jeff Buckley as influences, among others. The band has been praised for their vocal harmonies and lyricism, with Tone Deaf describing their songs as "beautifully crafted poems, where the listener becomes adrift on a river of pure magic." Triple J asserts that CLEWS' songs will "make your heart explode."

== Discography ==
=== Albums ===
List of albums, with selected details
Title	Details
What's Not to Love?	Released: November 2025; Label: Clews / Mandatory Music

=== Extended plays ===
List of EPs, with selected details
Title	Details
Loveluck Omens	Released: May 2021; Label: Clews
Love Prank	Released: February 2024; Label: Clews

== Awards and nominations ==
=== Vanda & Young Global Songwriting Competition ===
The Vanda & Young Global Songwriting Competition is an annual competition that "acknowledges great songwriting whilst supporting and raising money for Nordoff-Robbins" and is coordinated by Albert Music and APRA AMCOS. It commenced in 2009.

Year	Nominee / work	Award	Result	Ref.
2025	"When You’re Around"	Vanda & Young Global Songwriting Competition	Finalist	
