= Thatboykwame =

thatboykwame
- Also known as: Kwame (2016–2024)
- Born: Rich Amevor; 6 September 1997 (age 29); Auckland, New Zealand
- Origin: Western Sydney, Australia
- Genre: Hip Hop/Rap
- Occupations: Rapper; Producer
- Instrument: Vocals
- Years active: 2016–present
- Label: independent

Rich Amevor (born 6 September 1997), known professionally as thatboykwame (and previously as Kwame), is an Australian rapper and record producer. He has released four EPs: Lesson Learned in 2017, Endless Conversations in 2018, Please, Get Home Safe in 2020 and thatboykwame in 2022.

== Early life ==
Rich Amevor was born to Ghanaian parents in Auckland, New Zealand, and migrated to Australia at the age of two with his family. thatboykwame grew up in Glenwood, in the Blacktown District, New South Wales of Western Sydney. He started making music at 16.

== Career ==
thatboykwame first rose to prominence following a 2016 ASAP Ferg concert in The Metro Theatre, at which he was invited on stage to perform freestyle rap. Taking on thatboykwame as his professional name, he released his debut single "I Get It" in October 2016. In March 2017, he released his debut EP Lessons Learned, about which he said "I talk about things that I've dealt with... feeling low sometimes, like you're not worth anything, and I just pour that out through an artistic form in hopes that people will relate to it".

In March 2018, thatboykwame released his second EP, Endless Conversations. He said "Every track [is] a conversation in itself, as well as part of a bigger whole, like those undercurrents that are always there in relationships... Each track builds on the last, following a progression that gives form to the story as I explore the pressures of life and relationships as a creative".

Through Triple J Unearthed in 2018, Kwame won a competition to open Splendour in the Grass, and received the J Award for Unearthed Artist of the Year. In November 2018, his single "Clouds" was premiered by Zane Lowe on Beats 1.

In September 2019, he released "STOP KNOCKIN' @ MY DOOR", the lead single from his third EP. He supported a range of artists on tour, including Migos, 6lack, Skepta, AJ Tracey and Peking Duk.

In July 2022, Kwame formed group BBGB with BLESSED, B Wise, Manu Crooks and Lil Spacely. BBGB released their debut single "Tough Love" on 15 July 2022.

His debut album anXXXiety attackkk was released on 5 July 2024.

The second album In a Matter of Time was released on 7 November 2025.

== Musical style ==
His music has been described as having the experimentalism of all genres through storytelling, production, lyricism, visuals and theatrical components that create an experience by the principles of open-endedness and nonlinearity.

== Discography ==
=== Albums ===
List of albums, with release date and label shown
Title	Details
anXXXiety attackkk!	Released: 5 July 2024; Label: thissideourside; Format: Digital download, streaming
In a Matter of Time	Released: 7 November 2025; Label: thissideourside; Format: digital download, streaming
These Are Just My Thoughts	Released: 7 May 2026; Label: thatboy operations; Format: digital download, streaming

=== Extended plays ===
List of extended plays, with release date and label shown
Title	Details
Lessons Learned	Released: 21 March 2017; Label: thissideourside; Format: Digital download, streaming
Endless Conversations	Released: 23 March 2018; Label: thissideourside; Format: Digital download, streaming
Please, Get Home Safe	Released: 30 October 2020; Label: Def Jam ANZ; Formats: Digital download, streaming
thatboykwame	Released: 2 December 2022; Label: thissideourside; Formats: Digital download, streaming

=== Certified singles ===
List of singles as featured artist, with year released and album name shown
Title	Year	Certifications
"So Easy" (Triple One featuring Matt Corby & Kwame)	2019	ARIA: Gold

== Awards and nominations ==
=== J Awards ===
Year	Nominee / work	Award	Result
2018	himself	Unearthed Artist of the Year	Won
