= Rosie Carney =

Irish musician

Rosie Carney is an Irish musician.

== History ==
Carney was born in Hampshire, England but moved to Ireland at the age of ten. Carney signed a record deal at age 16. In 2017, Carney released a song titled Winter. In 2019, Carney released her debut full-length album titled Bare. In December 2020, she released a full cover LP of Radiohead’s The Bends. Her 10-track album Doomsday ... Don't Leave Me Here was released in 2026.
