= Sumner (duo) =

Australian music duo

- Origin: Launceston, Tasmania, Australia
- Genres: Pop, Indie, Electronic
- Labels: Etcetc, Lab78
- Members: Chloe Wilson; Jack McLaine

Sumner is an Australian electronic duo songwriter formed in Launceston, Tasmania, Australia, in 2018. The pair met by living in the small town of Launceston, and finding each other's music through mutual friends. They decided to link up to play a gig as ‘Sumner’. The name 'Sumner' originated from Chloe's middle name. Their song "Stranded" received full rotation on triple j and made it into the Triple J Hottest 200, 2021. Chloe has epilepsy.

The duo signed to Pnau's label 'Lab78' in 2021.

In August 2023, Sumner featured on Holy Holy's single "Ready". The song was used for a Channel 7 promotional video.

In May 2025, Sumner covered Madonna's "Like a Prayer" for Triple J's Like a Version.

== Discography ==
=== Extended plays (EP) ===
List of EPs, with selected details
Title	EP details
All That I Am	Released: 16 February 2018; Label: Sumner; Formats: streaming, CD
Retrograde	Released: 14 February 2025; Label: Sumner, etcetc Music; Formats: streaming

=== Singles ===
List of singles, with year released and album name shown
Title	Year	Album
"All That I Am"	2018	All That I Am
"Lover"	2018	All That I Am
"Pictures"	2018	All That I Am
"45 Roses"	2018	All That I Am
"Put it Out"	2018	-
"Blame Myself"	2019	-
"Stranded"	2021	-
"South"	2021	-
"Good Light"	2022	-
"Desire"	2022	-
"Your Love"	2024	Retrograde
"Half Myself Without You"	2024	Retrograde
"Starlight"	2025	Retrograde
"When You're Alone"	2025	Retrograde
"Sundown (Interlude)"	2025	Retrograde
"Follow"	2025	Retrograde

==== Promotional singles ====
List of promotional singles, with year released and album name shown
Title	Year	Album
"Like a Prayer", Madonna cover (Triple J Like a Version)	2025	Non-album single

==== Collaborations / Featurings ====
List of singles, year released and album name shown and main artist
Title	Year	Album	Main Artist
"Ready"	2023	Cellophane	Holy Holy
"Follow Me"	2025		Hayden James

== Videography ==
=== Music videos ===
List of music videos, with title, year released, type and reference
Title	Year	Type	Ref.
"Stranded"	2021	Official Music Video	
"South"	2021	Official Music Video	
"Stranded (LIVE)"	2021	Pro LIVE recording	
"Good Light"	2022	Official Music Video	
"Desire"	2022	Official Music Video	
"Your Love"	2024	Official Visualiser	
"Half Myself Without You"	2024	Official Visualiser	
"Starlight"	2025	Official Music Video	
"Follow"	2025	Official Visualiser	
"When You're Alone"	2025	Official Visualiser	
"Starlight (live for Like A Version) "	2025	Pro LIVE recording	
"Madonna's 'Like A Prayer' (live for Like A Version)"	2025	Pro LIVE recording	

== Awards and nominations ==
APRA AMCOS

Year	Nominee / work	Award	Result	Ref.
2023	Chloe Wilson (Sumner)	Professional Development Awards, category DANCE/ELECTRONIC	Nominated	

== Concert tours ==
- Sumner has supported Vera Blue, Montaigne, Slowly Slowly (band) and performed at Party In The Paddock Festival and Falls Festival.
- 2024 - Sumner was the support band of Empire of the Sun for their 4 concerts in Australia.
- 2025 - Sumner did 6 concerts in the major cities of South East Australia and went on tour as the support band of Sophie Ellis-Bextor during her 17 dates in Ireland and the UK. It is their first time playing outside Australia.
