= Wonderlick =

American indie rock band

- Origin: Los Angeles
- Genres: Indie rock, folk rock, pop rock
- Years active: 2001–present
- Labels: Future Farmer Records, Rock Ridge Music
- Spinoff of: Too Much Joy
- Members: Tim Quirk and Jay Blumenfield
- Past members: Penn Jillette (bass); Wendy Allen of The Court & Spark (vocals), Steve Michener of Big Dipper (bass)

Wonderlick is a Los Angeles–based indie rock band established in 2001 by Too Much Joy members Tim Quirk and Jay Blumenfield.

== History ==
Quirk and Blumenfield originally formed the band in December 2000 to record free music for a website, entitled "Susquehanna Hat Company", which they had set up to sell Too Much Joy merchandise. Quirk and Blumenfield recorded Wonderlick's music using Pro Tools in Oakland, California.

=== Wonderlick (2002) recording and release ===
After releasing the song "I Disappear" for free on their website and noticing the overwhelmingly positive response it garnered from their fans, including the more than $12,000 they eventually made from songs posted on that website, Quirk and Blumenfield decided to record 12 more songs, release each one monthly via their website, and call the project "Wonderlick." The recording of these songs was funded by a presale the band set up on the Susquehanna Hat Company website, which allowed fans to choose whatever price they wanted to pay for the album, and promised that fans who paid more than the average would have their names printed in the album's liner notes. The presale was a complete success, with fans paying $32 for the album on average. They released these songs first only through their website, but later re-released them as their eponymous debut album in 2002 on Future Farmer Records at the label's behest.

=== Topless at the Arco Arena ===
They released a sophomore album, "Topless at the Arco Arena", in 2009 on Rock Ridge Music. This album's title was based on an essay Quirk wrote in 2004 comparing an AC/DC concert in 2001 at the Arco Arena, where a woman went topless, to the dot-com boom and eventual bust.

In 2013, the band released a song entitled "Sixteenyearoldgirl," their first release in several years, which received a favorable review from PopMatters.

== Media appearances ==
Their music has been featured in MTV's Sex in the '90's series and in the HBO documentary Small Town Ecstasy.

== Discography ==
- Wonderlick (2002) – Future Farmer Records
- Topless at the Arco Arena (2009) – Rock Ridge Music
- Super (2015) – self-released
