= Wonderlick Entertainment =

Australian music company

- Type: Private company
- Industry: Music industry
- Founded: 2007; 19 years ago
- Founders: Gregg Donovan and Stu MacQueen
- Headquarters: Sydney, Australia
- Area served: Australia and United States
- Products: Music production
- Website: www.wonderlick.com.au

Wonderlick Entertainment is an Australian music company with its head office located in Sydney, Australia.

== History ==
Wonderlick Entertainment was founded by co-CEOs Gregg Donovan and Stu MacQueen in 2007, building on Donovan's existing list of clients. Donovan and MacQueen expanded from a management company into a full service music company, adding a joint venture record label with Sony Music (Wonderlick Recording Company) and a publishing company (Wonderlick Publishing).

In 2018, the company opened an office in New York City.

In October 2020, it was announced that Stu MacQueen and Dan Crannitch, both of Wonderlick, would be providing professional mentoring for the sixth Robert Stigwood Fellowship in South Australia.

== Recognition ==
In 2019, The Music ranked Donovan and McQueen at number twenty-two in their "Power 50" ranking of top Australian music business personnel based on their management of Wonderlick.

== Artists ==
- Airbourne
- Will Blume
- Clews
- Jess Day
- Flowerkid
- Grinspoon
- Holy Holy
- Phil Jamieson
- Japanese Wallpaper
- Montaigne
- The Paper Kites
- Josh Pyke
- Amy Shark
