= Goodbye Cruel World (Custard album) =

Goodbye Cruel World: The Best of Custard

Greatest hits album by Custard
- Released: May 2000
- Genres: Pop, rock
- Length: 58:43 (Standard Edition); 101:47 (Deluxe Edition)
- Labels: rooArt; BMG; Arista
- Producer: Magoo

Custard chronology
Loverama (1999)	Goodbye Cruel World: The Best of Custard (2000)	Brisbane 1990-1993 (2001)

Goodbye Cruel World: The Best of Custard is a best compilation by Australian band, Custard. The album was released in May 2000 and peaked at number 64 on the ARIA Charts.

== Track listing ==
Disc One
No.	Title	Length
1.	"Apartment"	2:24
2.	"Pack Yr Suitcases"	2:16
3.	"Girls Like That (Don't Go for Guys Like Us)"	3:11
4.	"Anatomically Correct"	2:43
5.	"Music Is Crap"	3:08
6.	"Caboolture Speed Lab"	2:13
7.	"Alone"	2:43
8.	"Ringo"	2:50
9.	"Pinball Lez"	2:22
10.	"If Yr Famous and You Know It Sack Yr Band"	2:38
11.	"Singlette"	3:06
12.	"Sunset Strip"	2:23
13.	"Leisuremaster"	2:50
14.	"Bedford"	2:25
15.	"Rockfish Anna"	2:04
16.	"Lucky Star"	2:32
17.	"Nice Bird"	3:01
18.	"The Wahooti Fandango"	3:03
19.	"The New Matthew"	4:18
20.	"Hit Song"	2:22
21.	"Apartment" (Machine Gun Fellatio Remix) (hidden track)	4:20
Total length:		58:43

Disc Two
No.	Title	Length
1.	"Sarsaparilla"	1:50
2.	"Short Pop Song"	1:14
3.	"Satellite"	1:54
4.	"Flannellette"	1:34
5.	"Cool World"	3:29
6.	"Hallelujah"	4:59
7.	"Spanglebug"	3:59
8.	"I Didn't Know I Loved You Until I Saw You Rock 'n' Roll"	2:48
9.	"Hootin' Tootin' Carmen"	1:58
10.	"Lucky Star" (Live in Berlin)	7:02
11.	"Nice Bird" (Original and the Best)	1:35
12.	"Hosef Malone" (Acoustical)	1:49
13.	"Mimi"	3:27
14.	"Fantastika"	2:47
15.	"Piece of Shit"	2:45
Total length:		43:04

== Charts ==
Chart (2000)	Peak position
Australian Albums (ARIA)	64
