= Glenn Thompson (musician) =

Australian musician (born 1964)

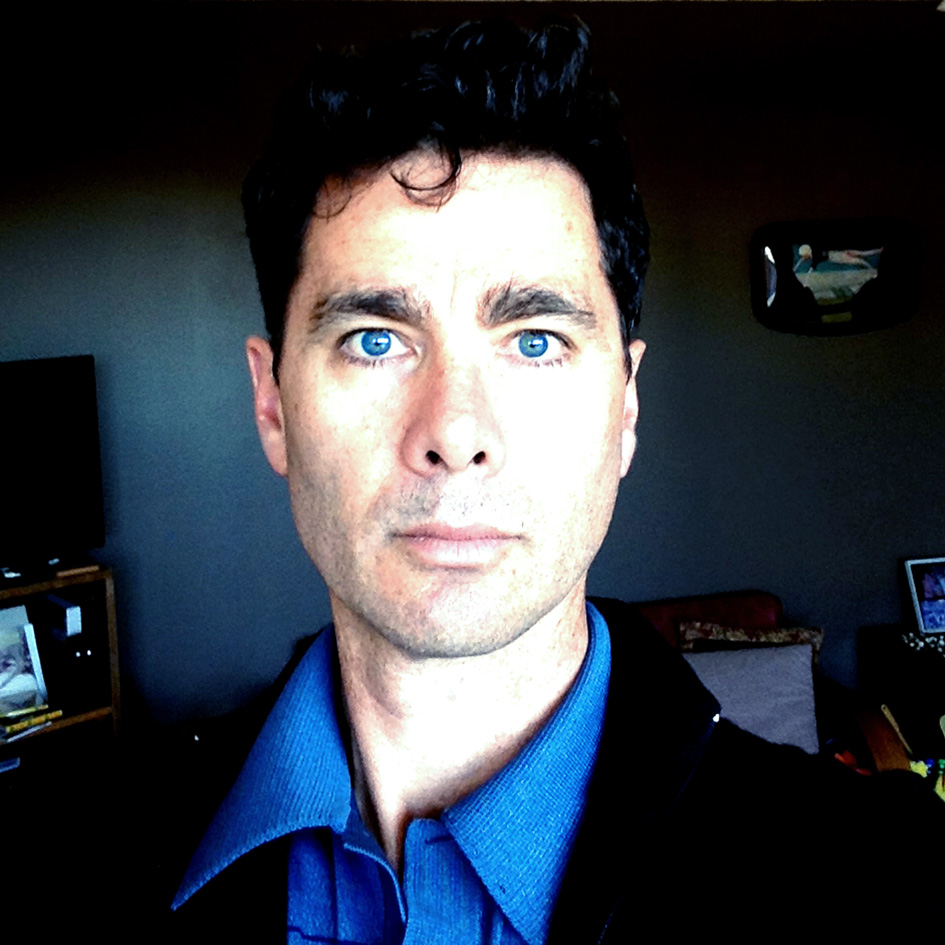
- Thompson in 2013

Background information
- Born: 6 December 1964 (age 61); Albury, New South Wales, Australia
- Genres: Country, art rock, pop
- Occupations: Musician, singer-songwriter
- Instruments: Vocals, guitar, keyboards, harmonica, drums, percussion
- Years active: 1984–present
- Label: Glitterhouse Records

Glenn Thompson (born 6 December 1964) is an Australian musician who first came to prominence in Brisbane, Queensland, playing in the popular local bands Madam Bones Brothel with Pearly Black and John Rodgers, and COW with Robert Moore and David McCormack. Thompson played drums with Robert Forster of The Go-Betweens on his second solo album Calling from a Country Phone in 1993. He then toured Europe in 1994 with Forster and members of German band Baby You Know, Robert Pöschl and Michael Schott. For Robert Forster's world tour of 1996, Thompson was joined by Adele Pickvance on bass. Thompson and Pickvance were called Warm Nights after Forster's fourth solo release which was also titled Warm Nights.

== Music career ==
In 1997, Thompson joined Brisbane band Custard. He was a member for the recording of their third album We Have The Technology in Easley Studios, Memphis, in 1997 and Loverama in Brisbane in 1999. Thompson wrote the unexpected hit "Music Is Crap", which made it into the list of the 50 best songs from the state of Queensland, as named by music critic Noel Mengel in 2013.

Custard split in 2000 after years of heavy touring and low CD sales. David McCormack founder and lead singer of Custard went on to form the Titanics with Thompson, journalist Emma Tom, and filmmaker/video artist Tina Havelock-Stevens. The Titanics released Love Is The Devil in 2000 and disbanded in 2001.

Robert Forster reformed The Go-Betweens with co-founder Grant McLennan and bassist Adele Pickvance to record The Friends of Rachel Worth in 2000 with Janet Weiss of Sleater Kinney on drums. Thompson replaced German drummer Mathias Strauder when the world tour to promote Rachel Worth reached Australia for the 2001 Big Day Out. Thompson went on to play on the Go-Betweens next two records, Bright Yellow Bright Orange and Oceans Apart, he was a member of the band until its demise in 2006 with the death of Grant McLennan.

Thompson formed Beachfield in 2006 as a vehicle for his songwriting. Brighton Bothways, Beachfield's first album, was released in Europe in 2007.

Pickvance, Thompson and Forster reconvened in 2007 to record Forsters fifth solo album The Evangelist.

In 2010, he formed a duo with Adele Pickvance from The Go-Betweens, called Adele&Glenn. They released the album Carrington Street on Glitterhouse Records in 2012.

From 2012 - 2016 Glenn performed in the three-piece family band The Answers with his son Wintah on electric guitar and daughter Nellie on synthesiser.

In July 2013, Thompson was named in the top ten greatest alternative music drummers in Australia.

== 2015 to present ==
The first new album by Custard in 16 years, Come Back, All Is Forgiven, was recorded and mixed by Thompson at his Horses of Australia Studio, in 2015.

Custard's seventh studio album, The Common Touch, was released in October 2017.

In 2020, at the beginning of the pandemic, Custard released Respect All Lifeforms.

Custard's most recent album Suburban Curtains came out in 2024

Thompson works as an exhibition manager at Bundanon NSW.

== Discography ==
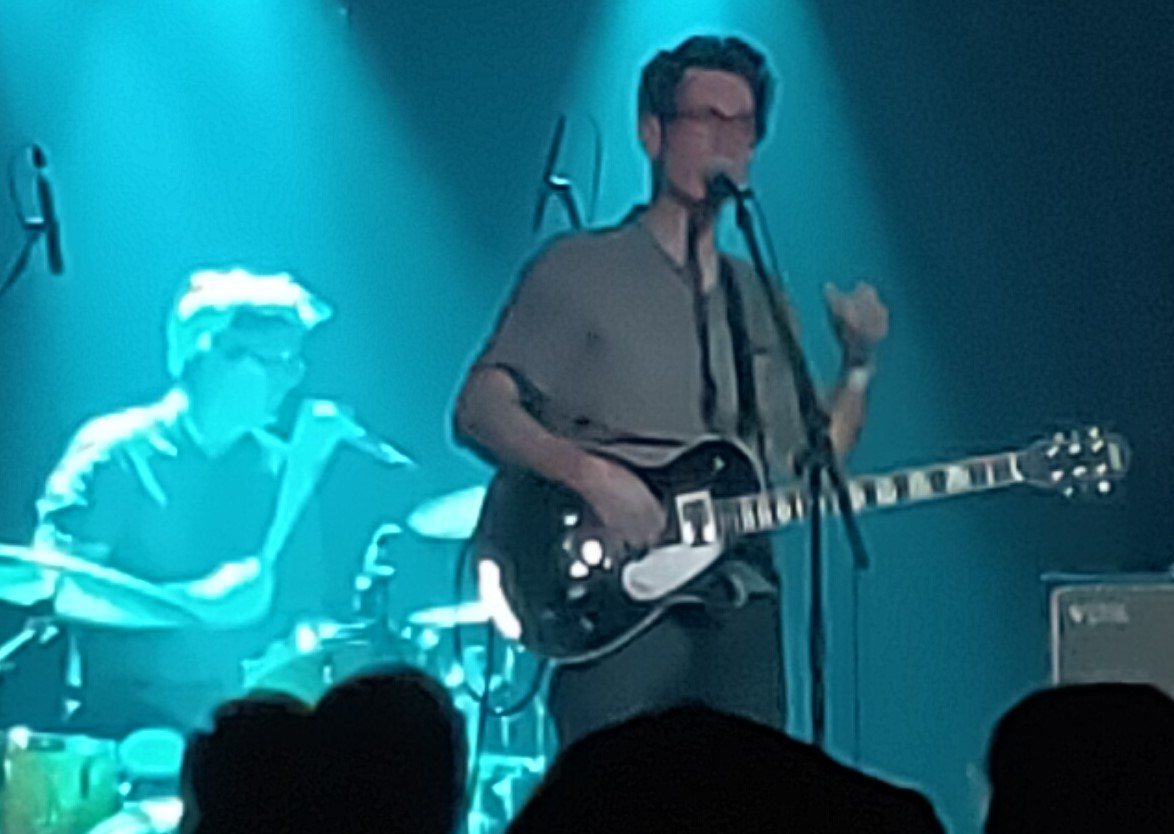
Thompson performs live in 2022

- Calling from a Country Phone - Robert Forster (1993)
- Beard - COW (1994)
- We Have The Technology - Custard (1997)
- Loverama - Custard (1999)
- Size Isn't Everything - The Titanics (2000)
- The Safety Jump - The Titanics (2000)
- Love is the Devil - The Titanics (2000)
- Bright Yellow Bright Orange - The Go-Betweens (2002)
- Oceans Apart - The Go-Betweens (2005)
- Brighton Bothways - Beachfield (2007)
- Write Your Adventures Down - Compilation (2007)
- The Evangelist - Robert Forster (2007)
- Carrington Street - Adele&Glenn (2012)
- Come Back, All Is Forgiven - Custard (2015)
- The Common Touch (album) - Custard (2017)
- Respect All Lifeforms - Custard (2020)
- Suburban Curtains - Custard (2024)
