= Girls Like That =

Girls Like That may refer to:

- "Girls Like That", a song by Deep Purple from their album Rapture of the Deep
- Girls Like That (play), a play by Evan Placey
- "Girls Like That (Don't Go for Guys Like Us)", a song by Custard
