= Apartment (Custard song) =

1995 single by Custard

Single by Custard

from the album Wisenheimer
- Released: October 1995
- Genre: Pop, rock
- Length: 2:26
- Label: rooArt
- Songwriters: David McCormack, Paul Medew, Matthew Strong, Danny Plant
- Producer: Eric Drew Feldman

Custard singles chronology
"Alone" (1995)	"Apartment" (1995)	"Lucky Star" (1996)

"Apartment" is the first single from Wisenheimer, the third album by Australian band Custard. It was released in October 1995 and reached #7 in the 1995 Hottest 100.

== Lyrics ==
McCormack said the song was about, "hearing loss. You know when you hear too much loud music you get that ringing in your ears. I just thought it was the most obvious song I'd ever written. And the interior's red because, I imagine your head is red on the inside, and the 'Ears! Sing to me' bit is like because your ears are just going 'EEEEEEEEEEEEE'. And I don’t think that's a very happy song." McCormack later expanded on the song's evolution, indicating it had come together at a soundcheck at Melbourne's Public Bar in 1994. "In a moment of panic I remembered I had been working on a little guitar riff that sounded a bit like "Heard it Through the Grapevine" by Creedence Clearwater Revival. I played it to the band and within a few minutes we had the basic verse section worked out. I don't think I had any lyrics worked out for it until we were in the studio with Eric Drew Feldman. I couldn't get a vibe happening so Eric suggested we do it line by line, phrase by phrase. Somehow, that made it come together a little bit more."

== Reception ==
The Sydney Morning Herald described it as, "One-hundred and fifty seconds of smashing guitar momentum and offbeat lyrics that would probably now be loved by The Block's music supervisor." Rolling Stone Australia said the song had, "been fashioned with melody, imagination and undeniable craft and Eric Drew Feldman's production comes close to capturing the skill and energy of Custard live."

Double J named it in the top ten Australian songs of the 1990s, saying, "The furious pace at which this song hurtles is exhausting, its cavalcade of motifs completely overwhelming. How they managed to bring it all together into something so perfectly succinct truly beggars belief."

== Track listing ==
No.	Title	Writer(s)	Length
1.	"Apartment"	David McCormack, Paul Medew, Matthew Strong, Danny Plant	2:26
2.	"Roadside"	David McCormack, Matthew Strong	4:06
3.	"Streetwaves"	Pere Ubu	2:03

== Charts ==
Chart (1995)	Peak position
Australia (ARIA)	105
