= Hit Song =

Single by Custard

from the album Loverama
- Released: April 1999
- Genre: Pop, rock
- Length: 9:19
- Label: rooArt
- Songwriters: David McCormack, Glenn Thompson, Paul Medew, Matthew Strong
- Producer: Magoo

Custard singles chronology
"Girls Like That (Don't Go For Guys Like Us)" (1998)	"Hit Song" (1999)	"Ringo (I Feel Like)" (1999)

"Hit Song" is a song by Custard, released as the second single from the band's fifth album, Loverama. It reached No. 60 on the Australian ARIA singles chart, and No. 83 on the 1999 Hottest 100.

== Lyrics ==
McCormack said, "The record companies are always keen for that radio-friendly, unit-shifting smash hit. And that is their job I guess. So I basically quoted all the things I'd heard them say to us and other people. Like you have to have a hit song -- you need a chorus and the verse and then the other chorus and it just seemed like a formula. So I thought that if they want a hit song I will just write exactly what they want and I guess they thought I was being too cynical and ironic but I was just trying to give them what they wanted. I gave them exactly what they asked for. And they said 'Thank you very much'."

== Track listing ==
No.	Title	Length
1.	"Hit Song"	2:24
2.	"Caboolture Speed Lab" (New Version)	2:16
3.	"Searching"	2:05
4.	"The Wedding Song"	2:35

== Charts ==
Chart (1999)	Peak position
Australia (ARIA)	60
