= Unit (album) =

1997 studio album by Regurgitator

Studio album by Regurgitator
- Released: 7 November 1997
- Recorded: May−August 1997
- Studios: "The Dirty Room", Brisbane, Australia
- Length: 36:17 (Unit); 50:50 (Unit Re-Booted)
- Label: Eastwest
- Producers: Regurgitator, Magoo

Regurgitator chronology
Tu-Plang (1996)	Unit (1997)	...art (1999)

Singles from Unit
- 1. "Everyday Formula" Released: October 1997; 2. "Black Bugs" Released: January 1998; 3. "Polyester Girl" Released: May 1998; 4. "! (The Song Formerly Known As)"/"Modern Life" Released: September 1998

Unit is the second studio album by Australian rock band Regurgitator, released in November 1997. Its style is a mixture of 1980s style synthesised pop music and alternative rock, with some hip hop influences. The album debuted and peaked at number 4 on the ARIA Charts. At the ARIA Music Awards of 1998, the album won five ARIA Music Awards; including Album of the Year.

In October 1998, the album was re-released as Unit Re-Booted, which included the album's five music videos.

In 2012, Regurgitator performed the entire album along with Tu-Plang on the Australian RetroTech tour.

The album was re-issued on vinyl by Valve in October 2013.

== Background ==
=== Prior to recording ===
Regurgitator had just completed their eleventh extensive Australian tour (with The Fauves and Tomorrow People), when they planned to start recording a follow-up to their first album, Tu-Plang. This was delayed when the band decided to make their third trip to America to do a tour with bands Helmet and The Melvins. Yeomans said of the tour, "I remember being completely frightened the whole time. They were real hard-arses. Helmet were a little army unit, and their fans were fucking really intense, really aggressive guys. Yeah, really full-on. So maybe it did have an effect." In 2008, manager Paul Curtis recalled that Yeomans had also stated "thank god Grinspoon came along because they took all the male angst away from our shows".

=== The Dirty Room ===
Upon return, the group rented a condemned warehouse in Brisbane's Fortitude Valley to write and record Unit. They affectionately named this studio "The Dirty Room". Yeomans said, "Martin did a lot of the set up – Magoo as well – and they put in carpet underlay that they'd found somewhere that was just filthy. Ergh! It had this real soporific effect as soon as you walked in and you just wanted to fall asleep. One of the funny stories is Rob Cavallo coming in to have a listen to one of the tracks, and he just fell asleep on this piss-stained mattress we had lying on the ground. It was a really dingy vibe."

== Writing and recording ==
Regurgitator had begun experimenting with drum machines and synthesizers on their first album, Tu-Plang. Amongst the gear that Yeomans and Ely were using at the time was the Clavia Nord Lead, the Akai S3000XL, the Farfisa Super Bravo Organ and the newly released Roland MC-303 groovebox, which featured on a number of tracks including "Unit" and "Polyester Girl". Ely stated that the track that ultimately helped the band decide the change in musical direction was the ironically titled "I Like Your Old Stuff Better Than Your New Stuff", which began as a punk rock track with some keyboard but gradually "breaking it down with a more minimal keyboard heavy sound, leaving off most of the distorted guitar attack, and adding a vocoder gave the song something we were excited and terrified by at the same". Magoo added, "Martin said, 'Let's go full Ultravox!" We started going, let's record the drums without cymbals. Let's have the keyboards play the basslines."

After 6 weeks of recording, the album was completed on 2 August 1997.

== Musical style ==
It has been labelled as being less guitar-based than their previous work. "Everyday Formula" was chosen as the lead single since its heavier sound would be less of a departure for the band's old fans. The guitars on that song have been described as being overly "fuzzy" and almost "cartoonish", in contrast to their previous album Tu-Plang. AllMusic believed that the album had a strong 1980s synthesizer pop influence, unlike Tu-Plang which had more of a contemporary 1990s sound. They wrote that "pleasant, melodic pop songs take over from Tu-Plang's hip hop/metal/funk disasters like 'Couldn't Do It'". Some tracks like "!" and "Polyester Girl" have been called almost entirely electronic songs.

== Cover art ==
The cover is a large, plain yellow circle centred on a plain silver background. On the outside surface of the jewel CD case is a transparent sticker with the words "REGURGITATOR" and "UNIT" printed in black for identification in stores. This minimalist design, credited to "The Shits" (Quan Yeomans and Janet English) and Ben Ely, won the 1998 ARIA award for best cover art.

Unit Re-Booted has very similar cover art, and came in four bright colour variations – lime green, purple, royal blue and peach-orange. On the re-releases, the title text was printed directly onto the paper.

== Reception and legacy ==
Professional ratings
Review scores
Source	Rating
AllMusic	2.5/5 stars

In October 2010, the album was listed in the top 30 in the book 100 Best Australian Albums. In July 2011, the album was voted 10th in Triple J's Hottest 100 Australian Albums of All Time. In December 2021, the album was listed at no. 14 in Rolling Stone Australia's '200 Greatest Albums of All Time' countdown.

In 2017, Regurgitator played a special one-off show at the Gold Coast Convention & Exhibition Centre celebrating 20 years of Unit, with the show called UNIT20. The show was filmed & was later released on DVD in 2019.

In 2022, the album was included in the Oceania line of the 33⅓ book series.

In 2023, Regurgitator toured around Australia for 25 years of Unit, with Custard, DZ Deathrays, Butterfingers & Glitoris.

== Track listing ==
Unit track listing
No.	Title	Writer(s)	Length
1.	"I Like Your Old Stuff Better Than Your New Stuff"	B. Ely	2:35
2.	"Everyday Formula"	Q. Yeomans	2:12
3.	"! (The Song Formerly Known As)"	Q. Yeomans	3:25
4.	"Black Bugs"	B. Ely	3:00
5.	"The World of Sleaze"	Q. Yeomans	3:25
6.	"I Piss Alone"	Q. Yeomans	2:05
7.	"Unit"	B. Ely/M. Lee/Q. Yeomans	1:42
8.	"I Will Lick Your Arsehole"	Q. Yeomans	3:20
9.	"Modern Life"	B. Ely	2:23
10.	"Polyester Girl"	Q. Yeomans	3:33
11.	"1234"	B. Ely	0:51
12.	"Mr T"	B. Ely	3:08
13.	"Just Another Beautiful Story"	Q. Yeomans	4:38
Total length:			36:17

Re-Booted music videos
No.	Title	Length
1.	"Everyday Formula"	2:12
2.	"Black Bugs"	3:00
3.	"Polyester Girl"	3:33
4.	"! (The Song Formerly Known As)"	3:25
5.	"Modern Life"	2:23
Total length:		14:33

== Charts ==
=== Weekly charts ===
Weekly chart performance for Unit
Chart (1997–1999)	Peak position
Australian Albums (ARIA)	4
New Zealand Albums (RMNZ)	7

=== Year-end charts ===
1997 year-end chart performance for Unit
Chart (1997)	Position
Australian Albums Chart	93

1998 year-end chart performance for Unit
Chart (1998)	Position
Australian Albums Chart	20

== Certifications ==
Certifications for Unit
Region	Certification	Certified units/sales
Australia (ARIA)	3× Platinum	210,000^{^}
^{^} Shipments figures based on certification alone.

== Release history ==
Release history for Unit
Region	Date	Format	Label	Catalogue
Australia	November 1997	CD; LP	EastWest	3984212761
United Kingdom	1998	CD	Coalition	
Australia	October 1998	CD; LP; cassette	EastWest	3984252602
Australia	October 2013	Digital download; streaming; LP	Valve	V131V
