= Wahooti Fandango =

Studio album by Custard
- Released: September 1994
- Recorded: 1993–1994 at Sunshine Studios, Brisbane
- Genres: Pop, rock
- Length: 38:14
- Label: rooArt
- Producer: Simon Holmes

Custard chronology
Buttercup/Bedford (1992)	Wahooti Fandango (1994)	Wisenheimer (1995)

Wahooti Fandango is the second album by Australian band Custard. It was released in 1994 and peaked at number 89 on the ARIA Charts in June 1995.

== Title and artwork ==
McCormack said, "Wahooti is just a slang term for marijuana… Fandango… we had a poster once that said "Custard Meat Fandango", and I thought, well 'Fandango' sounds good. 'Wahooti', I don't know… Matthew [guitarist] will like it if there's a drug reference there you've got Matthew onside. So I think it just means 'Marijuana Party', I guess."

The back cover of the album shows the band on horseback with McCormack in a suit and Strong wearing cowboy clothes. The inner-sleeve individual photos of the band members shows each with a cannister of nitrous oxide in the background.

== Reception ==
In 1997, Rolling Stone Australia named it in their best 100 Australian albums of all time, saying, "Custard delivered on the pop promise the "Rockfish Anna" and "Gastanked" EPs with the wit, charm and style of Wahooti Fandango. Drawing on a vast array of influences (from the art-rock of Pere Ubu, Devo and Sonic Youth to country ballads and big band swing), Custard's casual, whimsical approach to their own music often masks the degree of craft underlying songs. In 2021, Loverama replaced it in the list.

Andrew Stafford, in Pig City, said the album " saw Custard's transformation from lightweight guitar band to something altogether more exotic. The album zigzagged from thrash pop to cocktail jazz on the whim of the group's eccentric leader."

== Track listing ==
Credits adapted from the CD liner notes.

No.	Title	Writer(s)	Length
1.	"Teensville"	David McCormack	1:27
2.	"Aloha Tambourinist"	McCormack	2:25
3.	"Pack Yr Suitcases"	McCormack, Dylan McCormack	2:16
4.	"Dix TV"	McCormack	4:10
5.	"Alone"	McCormack, Paul Medew, Danny Plant, Matthew Strong	2:43
6.	"Looking for Someone"	McCormack	2:22
7.	"Say It"	Medew	3:04
8.	"Melody"	McCormack, Dylan McCormack, Ian McCormack	2:19
9.	"Fantastic Plastic"	McCormack	1:02
10.	"Singlette"	McCormack, Medew	3:06
11.	"If Yr Famous and You Know It Sack Yr Band"	McCormack	2:38
12.	"Bye Bye Birdie"	McCormack, Dylan McCormack	2:21
13.	"Universal Vibration"	McCormack	1:48
14.	"Badloving"	McCormack, Medew	3:38
15.	"The Wahooti Fandango"	McCormack	3:03
Total length:			38:14

== Charts ==
Chart (1994/95)	Peak position
Australian Albums (ARIA)	88
