= I Don't Like It =

- 1998 CD cover

Single by Pauline Pantsdown
- B-side: "Pauline's Nightmare"
- Released: 1 August 1998
- Genre: Pop; novelty; parody; plunderphonics
- Length: 3:17
- Label: Caring Potato
- Songwriter: Pauline Pantsdown
- Producer: Pauline Pantsdown

Pauline Pantsdown singles chronology
"Backdoor Man" (1997)	"I Don't Like It" (1998)

"I Don't Like It" is a song by Australian satirist Pauline Pantsdown released on 1 August 1998. It features unauthorised vocals from Pauline Hanson, a former independent MP and later founder of One Nation, sampled from interviews and media clips. It peaked at number 10 on the Australian ARIA Charts and was ranked number 58 in the 1998 Triple J Hottest 100 countdown.

== Background ==
In 1997, Simon Hunt (a lecturer in sound and film at the College of Fine Arts in Sydney) as Pauline Pantsdown had released a song called "Backdoor Man", which had received a cult following and been played on Triple J, the youth network of the Australian Broadcasting Corporation (ABC). Hanson won an injunction to stop the ABC playing the song, and in response, Hunt recorded another single titled "I Don't Like It". The title lyric, to Hunt, "epitomised the whinging, that she would complain about things, and never have solutions". Hunt designed the song so that it would have politics for the adults, and that it would be catchy for kids to sing along.

On 3 October 1998, Hunt, dressed as Pauline Pantsdown, campaigned on the streets of Sydney in an attempt to entice voters away from Pauline Hanson and the One Nation Party during the 1998 Australian federal election.

On 7 March 2013 Hanson announced that she would stand in the 2013 federal election and Pantsdown reappeared with "I Don't Like It".

== Contents ==
=== Lyrics ===
The song’s lyrics, like those of its predecessor, use surreal and satirical imagery, including the line "my shopping trolley: murdered." Some lyrics appear to satirise Hanson’s conservative and nationalist politics, including "Why can’t my blood be coloured white? I should talk to some medical doctors; coloured blood is just not right."

=== Music video ===
A video clip was released featuring Simon Hunt as Pauline Pantsdown dressed as Pauline Hanson, singing the song to the camera in a number of scenarios, including in her office, her fish and chips shop and in a gay bar with Asian backing dancers.

== Track listing ==
CD single
No.	Title	Length
1.	"I Don't Like It" (Radio Edit)	3:17
2.	"I Don't Like It" (Xenophobia Mix)	5:25
3.	"Pauline's Nightmare"	2:37

== Charts ==
=== Weekly charts ===
Chart (1998)	Peak position
Australia (ARIA)	10

=== Year-end charts ===
Chart (1998)	Position
Australia (ARIA)	89
