= The Common Touch (album) =

2017 album by Custard

Studio album by Custard
- Released: 6 October 2017
- Recorded: 2017
- Studios: Linear Studio and Rancom Street Studio, Sydney
- Genres: Alternative rock, pop rock, indie rock
- Length: 40:23
- Label: ABC
- Producer: Custard

Custard chronology
Come Back, All Is Forgiven (2015)	The Common Touch (2017)	Respect All Lifeforms (2020)

The Common Touch is the seventh studio album by Australian alternative rock band Custard, released on 6 October 2017 by ABC Music. It was supported by the singles "In the Grand Scheme of Things (None of This Really Matters)" and "2000 Woman".

== Critical reception ==
Writing for the Sydney Morning Herald, Bronwyn Thompson described the album as "a varied and focused record that shows the band's eagerness to move beyond their quirky slacker pop 'golden days'".

== Tracklist ==
1. "In the Grand Scheme of Things (None of This Really Matters)" (David McCormack) –
2. "Halley's Comet" (McCormack)
3. "I'm Not Well" (McCormack)
4. "Princes HWY" (McCormack)
5. "Sinking Deep" (McCormack)
6. "You Always Knew" (McCormack)
7. "Hands on Fire" (Glenn Thompson)
8. "Armageddon" (McCormack)
9. "Dr. Huxley Creeper" (McCormack)
10. "2000 Woman" (McCormack)
11. "Police Cars" (G. Thompson, Wintah Thompson, Nellie Pollard-Wharton)
12. "Take It From Here" (McCormack)

== Personnel ==
Custard

- Paul Medew: bass guitar
- Matthew Strong: lead guitar
- David McCormack: electric guitar
- Glenn Thompson: drums

Additional musicians

- Jack Ward: cello (tracks 1, 4, 12)
- Little Roy Grunt: harmonica (track 1)
- Desmond Honeybottom: piccolo trumpet (track 1)
- Jy-Perry Bankes: pedal steel guitar (tracks 2, 4, 12)
- Meghan Drummond: backing vocals (tracks 3, 5, 12)
- Adele Pickvance: backing vocals (track 6)
- Nellie Pollard-Wharton: backing vocals (tracks 7, 11), keyboards (track 11)
- Anwyn Watkins, Haylee Poppi, Matteo Zingles: backing vocals (track 10)

Recording details

- Producer: David McCormack, Glenn Thompson
- Recorded by: Thompson, McCormack; Evan McHugh at Linear studio Sydney, Tim Whitten at Rancom Street studio Sydney
- Mixer: Thompson
- Mastering: J J Golden

Artworks

- Glenn Thompson: artwork, design
- Peter Fischmann: photographs
