= The Lost Aviator =

- Directed by: Andrew Lancaster
- Written by: Andrew Lancaster
- Cinematography: Max Davis; Nino Tamburri
- Edited by: Que Minh Luu; Andrew Soo
- Music by: Matteo Zingales
- Production companies: A Lancaster Film; Porchlight Films; Photoplay Films
- Distributed by: Transmission Films
- Release date: 2014
- Running time: 91 minutes
- Country: Australia
- Language: English

The Lost Aviator is a feature documentary written and directed by Andrew Lancaster starring Ewen Leslie as the voice of Bill Lancaster and Yael Stone as the voice of Chubbie Miller. The film was premiered at the 58th BFI London Film Festival, and was distributed theatrically by Transmission Films in Australia.

== Synopsis ==
Director Andrew Lancaster opens up a 1932 case about his uncle Bill Lancaster, an aviator who went on trial for murder in Miami. In the process he unravels more information about the illustrious life of Bill, which spans multiple continents.

== Cast ==
- Bill Lancaster voiced by Ewen Leslie
- Chubbie Miller voiced by Yael Stone
- Haden Clarke played by Kipan Rothbury
- Hawthorne voiced by Torquil Neilson
- Carson voiced by Troy Planet

== Production ==
The Lost Aviator was produced by Noni Couell and Andrew Lancaster in Association with Porchlight Films and Photoplay Films. It was shot over 4 years in Australia, England, the USA and France.

== Reception ==
The Lost Aviator had its world premiere at the 58th BFI London Film Festival in October 2014 and its US premiere at the 32nd Miami International Film Festival to sold out screenings. The Australian premiere was at the 62nd Sydney International Film Festival where it picked up a special jury mention for best documentary. Guy Lodge of Variety wrote "Family history merges with tabloid legend in Andrew Lancaster's engrossing account of a vintage aviation-world scandal" and "the director probes his relatives’ memories with delicacy and good humor." Hollywood Reporter critic Johnathan Holland wrote the Lost Aviator is "a great globe spanning story", "intriguing and thought provoking."
