= We Have the Technology =

Studio album by Custard
- Released: September 15, 1997
- Recorded: 1996, Memphis and San Francisco
- Genre: Pop, rock
- Length: 50:15
- Label: rooArt, Arista
- Producer: Eric Drew Feldman

Custard chronology
Wisenheimer (1995)	We Have the Technology (1997)	Loverama (1999)

Singles from Album
- 1. "Nice Bird" Released: 1997; 2. "Anatomically Correct" Released: 1997; 3. "Music Is Crap" Released: 1998

We Have the Technology is the fourth studio album by Australian band Custard, released on September 15, 1997. Three singles were lifted from the album, "Nice Bird", "Anatomically Correct", which reached #48 in the fifth Hottest 100 and "Music Is Crap," which reached #24 in the sixth Hottest 100. The guitar riff from "Pinball Lez" has subsequently been used in the children's TV show, Bluey, of which lead singer David McCormack is a cast member. In 2017, the album was issued on vinyl for the first time.

== Recording ==
McCormack later said, "I remember Eric Drew Feldman sitting me down in some diner, saying, 'Look, you've got to have a radio single. Go as crazy as you want, but you need three or four radio songs.' But, I was just like, 'No, man. We're fucking artists.'"

== Reception ==
Rolling Stone Australia said, "We Have The Technology is Custard exploring the dimensions of being their band. It's not just David McCormack directing traffic, it's all four members actively drawing on their experiences and natural enthusiasm for creating sounds and tunes. It's an immense pleasure to listen to an album made with such a liberal attitude, with a combined sense of fearless abandon and bedroom tinkering. Custard are fun. They're also smart, but don't blow their cover."

Rave said, "Custard are developing a special skill -- an ability to seem somewhat dippy on the surface and using that to lighten up more serious notions. The influences seem to come from everywhere and nowhere but are melded into a loose-limbed, gangly pop - gawky, with energy to burn but no apparent control mechanism in place. They're at their most methodical here, delivering an eclectic but even more willful collection of stupid/smart morsels of cracked pop."

The Courier-Mail noted, "Whereas the first two albums explored Custard's unique style of comedic pop, We Have the Technology is a more plenary opus, in lyrical content and musical style. The musicality of the release provides plenty of those moments that remind the listener why Custard is adored."

== Track listing ==
No.	Title	Length
1.	"Scared of Skill"	1:25
2.	"Memory Man"	1:25
3.	"Very Biased"	2:33
4.	"Anatomically Correct"	2:43
5.	"Hello Machine"	2:46
6.	"Totally Confused"	3:14
7.	"Piece of Shit"	2:29
8.	"Pinball Lez"	2:22
9.	"Sons and Daughters"	2:49
10.	"Nice Bird"	3:01
11.	"No Rock and Roll Record"	2:49
12.	"Sinatra Theory"	2:54
13.	"Schtum"	3:50
14.	"The Truth About Drugs"	2:39
15.	"Music Is Crap"	3:08
16.	"The Drum"	3:43
17.	"Eight Years of Rock and Roll Has Completely Destroyed My Memory*"	6:34

- Contains untitled hidden track.

== Charts ==
Chart (1997)	Peak position
Australian Albums (ARIA)	36
