= I Sucked a Lot of Cock to Get Where I Am =

1996 single by Regurgitator

Single by Regurgitator

from the album Tu-Plang
- Released: October 1996 (US)
- Studio: Center Stage Studios, Bangkok, Thailand
- Length: 2:34
- Label: Warner Music Australasia, Sub Pop
- Songwriter(s): Quan Yeomans
- Producer(s): Magoo, Regurgitator

Regurgitator singles chronology
"Miffy's Simplicity" (1996)	"I Sucked a Lot of Cock to Get Where I Am" (1996)	"Everyday Formula" (1997)

"I Sucked a Lot of Cock to Get Where I Am" is a song by Australian rock band Regurgitator, lifted from the band's debut studio album Tu-Plang. The song was not commercially released in Australia; however, a 7" vinyl single was released in US in October 1996 and in the UK in 1998.

The song was attacked by Australian radio broadcaster Alan Jones, who campaigned to have it removed from youth radio station Triple J's playlist. Christian groups also expressed outrage at the song. The song remains a fan favourite.

The song ranked at number 23 on Triple J's Hottest 100 in 1996.

Ben Ely said "I loved his idea of intense lyrical ideas with almost sweet pop melodies." Quan Yeomans said "I guess the main inspiration for this tune was probably our recent signing to the record company. I recall Warner 'loving' the song but being a bit apprehensive about leaving the title as it was. I believe they bandied other more palatable titles about, "Rinsing" comes to mind–but inevitably caved into our infantile demands."

== Reception ==
In 2019, Tyler Jenke from The Brag ranked Regurgitator's best songs, with "I Sucked a Lot of Cock to Get Where I Am" coming it at number 5. Jenke said "Describing an attitude of doing anything to reach the top, 'I Sucked a Lot of Cock to Get Where I Am' remains as one of Regurgitator's breakthrough hits, proving they can make memorable, catchy rock that resonates with fans everywhere – despite the questionable language"

Andrew Stafford, in Pig City, said, "The sarcasm was cheap, but so indelible was the melody, it logged hours more Triple J airplay for the band, to only minor outrage, even as radio announcers were forbidden to introduce the song by its full name."

== Track listings ==
7" single
No.	Title	Length
1.	"I Sucked a Lot of Cock to Get Where I Am"	2:34
2.	"Nothing to Say"	2:47

== Charts ==
Chart performance for "I Sucked a Lot of Cock to Get Where I Am"
Chart (1996)	Peak position
Australia (ARIA)	104

== Release history ==
Region	Date	Format	Label	Catalogue
United States	October 1996	7" single	Sub Pop	SP383
United Kingdom	1998	7" single (limited edition)	Coalition Recordings	COLA041
