= Custard (Australian band) =

Australian indie rock band

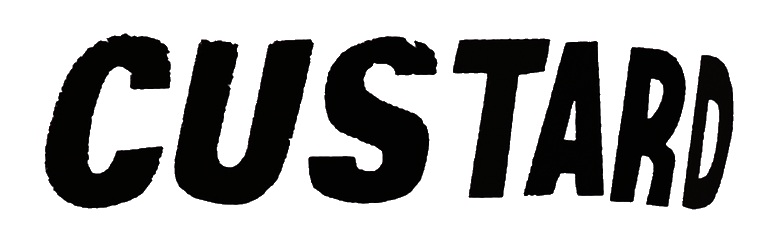
- Logo of the band

Background information
- Origin: Brisbane, Queensland, Australia
- Genre: Indie rock
- Years active: 1989–2000, 2009–present
- Labels: ABC Music, rooArt, BMG, Nettwerk, Arista
- Members: David McCormack; Paul Medew; Matthew Strong; Glenn Thompson
- Past members: James Straker; Shane Brunn; Gavin Herrenberg; Danny Plant; John Lowery; Tom Jackman; Dylan McCormack; Andrew Lancaster

Custard are an Australian indie rock band formed in 1989 in Brisbane, Queensland. The band is colloquially known as Custaro (/kʌsˈtɑːroʊ/) due to frequent misreadings of its name. They are best known for the ARIA Music Award–winning song "Girls Like That (Don't Go for Guys Like Us)".

== History ==
=== 1989–1993: Formation and early EPs ===
The band was originally known as Custard Gun and featured David McCormack on vocals and guitar, Paul Medew on bass (McCormack and Medew both ex-Who's Gerald?), James Straker (later in The Melniks) on guitar and Shane Brunn (who later formed Hugbubble and Vanlustbader) on drums. After a few shows and line up changes (namely Straker being replaced by Matthew Strong), Custard Gun morphed into Custard in early 1990.

Custard's first release was the four track vinyl EP Rockfish Anna, which was issued in November 1990. A fire breathing Elvis impersonator was part of the EP's launch festivities.

Custard's debut album, Buttercup/Bedford, was recorded in 1991. It was originally intended to be released on CD in March 1992, but the CDs failed to turn up on time for the album launch, forcing them to give away copies of the album on cassettes to keep the audience happy. It was not until the end of 1992 that the band finally got their hands on the elusive CDs. Custard had signed to Ra Records and had released their first "major label" release, an EP called Gastanked. Gastanked was followed in 1993 by another EP, Brisbane, and two singles, "Casanova" and "Singlette". By this time the band was onto its third drummer. Shane Brunn had been replaced by Gavin Herrenberg, who had subsequently been replaced by Danny Plant.

=== 1994–1995: Wahooti Fandango and Wisenheimer ===
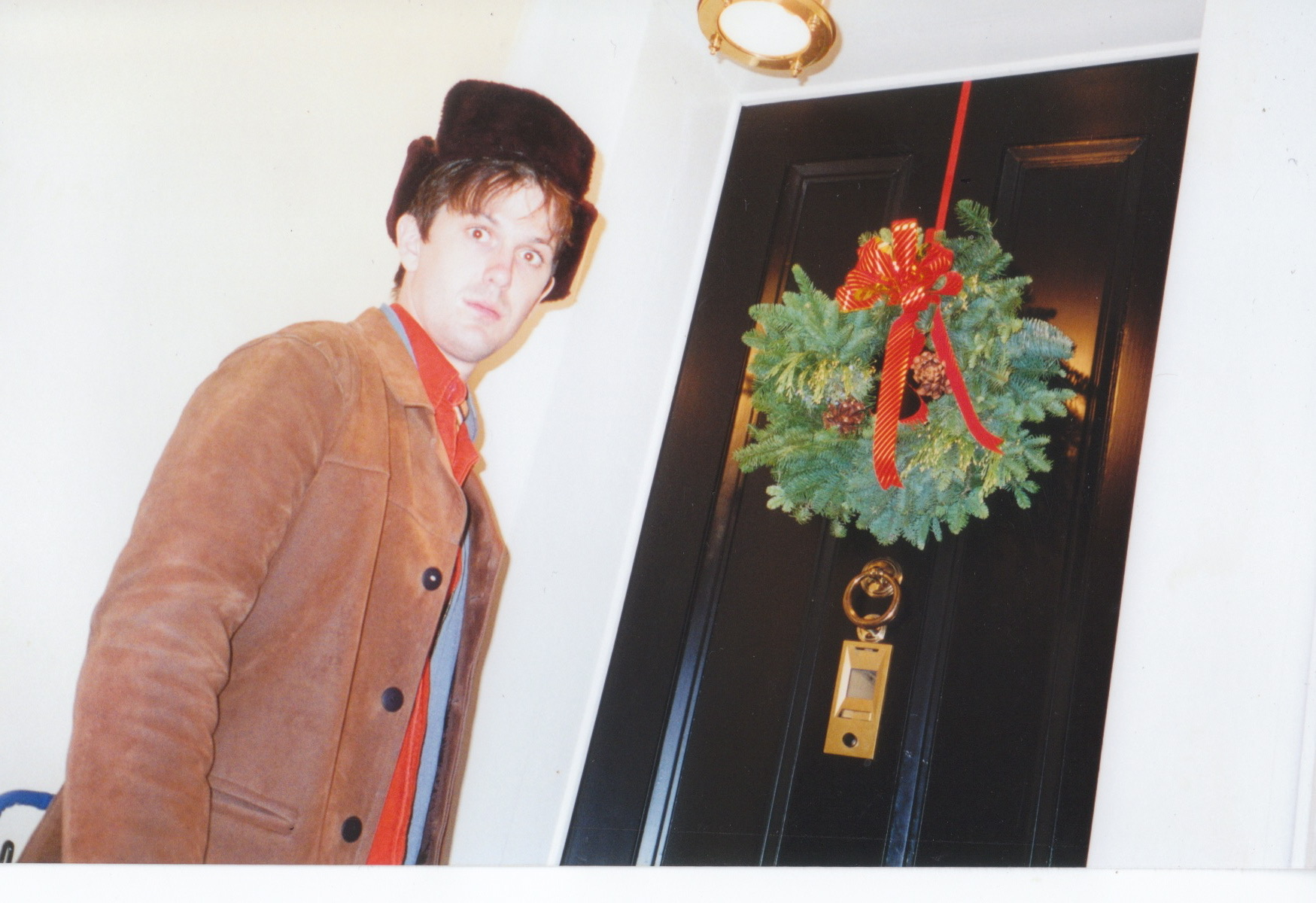
McCormack, 1990s

Custard's debut major label album Wahooti Fandango was issued in 1994. The video for the album's first single, "Aloha Tambourinist", was set on a beach, featured male models pretending to be Custard, while scantily clad women roll around in the sand.

Wahooti Fandango was critically acclaimed, and at the ARIA Music Awards of 1995 was nominated for Best Alternative Release.

The band's "breakthrough hit" did not come until October 1995, when they released "Apartment", the first single lifted from their third studio album, Wisenheimer. "Apartment" received a high rotation airplay on triple j, and was voted in at number 7 in the Triple J Hottest 100, 1995. Wisenheimer was recorded in San Francisco, being produced by Eric Drew Feldman (Captain Beefheart, PJ Harvey, Pere Ubu et al.). The album also spawned the singles "Sunset Strip", "Lucky Star" and "Leisuremaster".

After Wisenheimer, Danny Plant was replaced by Glenn Thompson.

=== 1996–1999: We Have the Technology and Loverama ===
On 24 November 1996, Custard performed on the forecourt of the Sydney Opera House as part of Crowded House's Farewell to the World concert, alongside You Am I and Powderfinger. Estimates of the audience in attendance range from 100,000 to 250,000 people.

1996 and 1997 were big years for the band, touring Australia with Weezer, Frank Black, Beck and the Presidents of the USA, and venturing back to America (where Wisenheimer had been recorded) to play more shows with the Presidents. While in the USA the band also recorded their 4th album, We Have the Technology.

"Nice Bird" was the first single to be lifted from We Have the Technology, followed by "Anatomically Correct". However, it was the final single, "Music is Crap", that captured the public's attention and became their first single to peak within the ARIA top 100. The song was written and sung by Thompson, and reinvigorated public interest in Custard.

The next single, "Girls Like That (Don't Go for Guys Like Us)" became the band's biggest hit. It peaked at #52 on the ARIA singles chart, and came in at 3 in the Triple J Hottest 100, 1998. At the ARIA Music Awards of 1999 they won Best Video for Andrew Lancaster and David McCormack. The album that it was featured on, Loverama, went on to become the band's most commercially successful.

Custard went on a six-month hiatus at the end of 1999, before eventually disbanding.

=== 2000–2008: Dissolution of the band, and other projects ===
After the split, lead singer and guitarist, McCormack, formed The Titanics with drummer, Thompson, also on guitar. Joining them were McCormack's then-wife, Emma Tom, on bass and Tina Havelock-Stevens on drums. The Titanics did not last long, releasing two albums, Size Isn't Everything and Love is the Devil, before the group disbanded.

McCormack released a series of solo albums with The Polaroids, featuring his brother Dylan (Gentle Ben and his Sensitive Side) on bass, Shane Melder (ex-Sidewinder) on drums and Cameron Bruce (Paul Kelly). Releases include "Candy" (2002), "Save Dave" DVD (2003), "The Truth About Love" (2004) and "Little Murders" (2009).

In 2004, Strong joined the Lost Gospel, alongside Phil Jamieson of Grinspoon. The group released one album.

Thompson joined The Go-Betweens in 2001, having previously played with Robert Forster and Grant McLennan in 1995. In addition to appearing on many of Forster's solo albums, Thompson played on The Go-Betweens' final two albums, Bright Yellow Bright Orange and Oceans Apart; and toured with the band until McLennan's death in 2006. Thompson then released his first solo album, Brighton Bothways, under the name "Beachfield" in 2007. In 2010, Thompson formed a duo with Adele Pickvance from The Go-Betweens, called Adele & Glenn, and launched a debut album in April 2012.

A DVD video clip compilation called The Spaces at the Side of the Road – A Digital History of Custard was released in 2007.

In 2008, Medew was a member of The Purple Hearts.

=== 2009–2011: Reformation ===
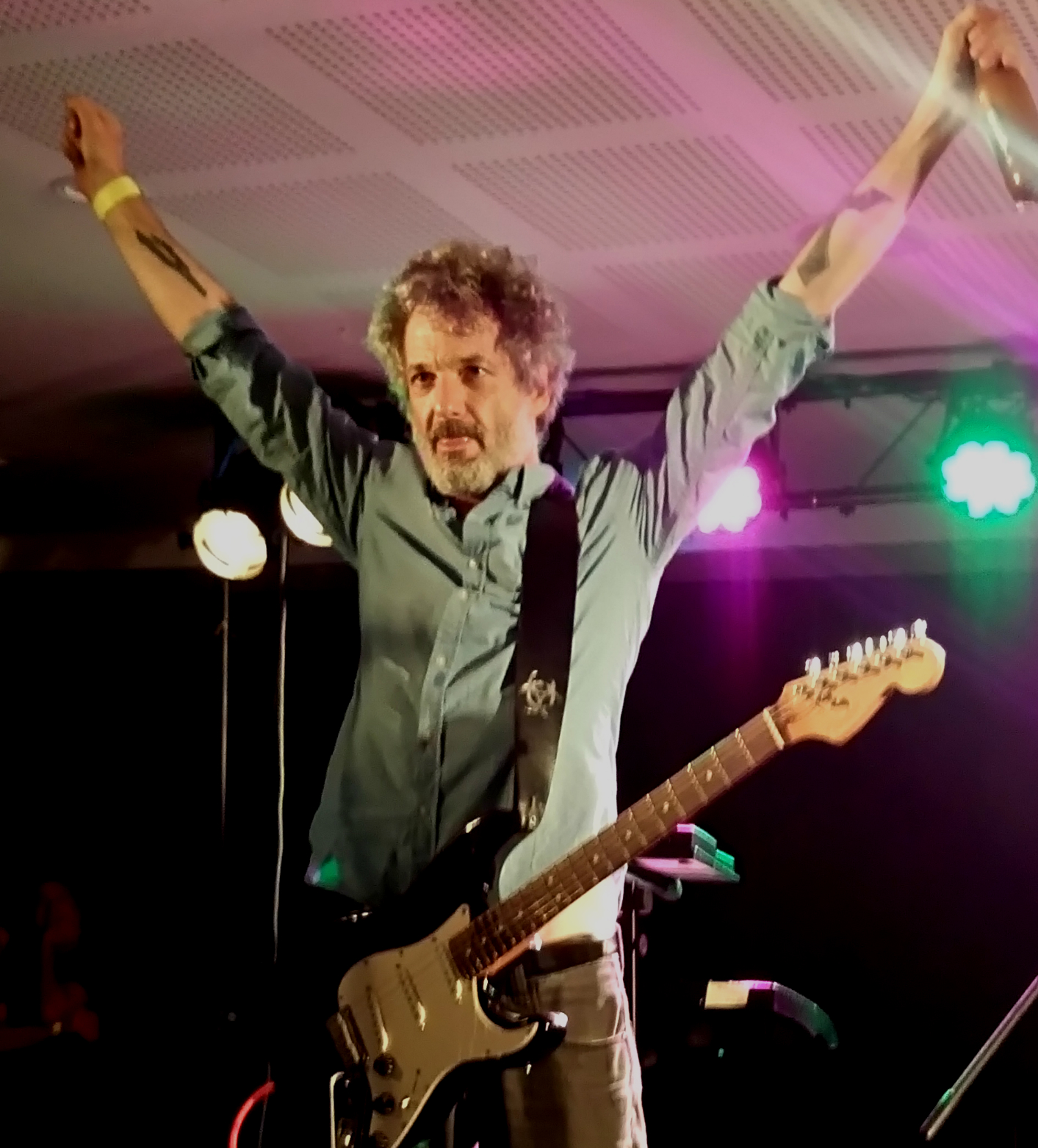
Matthew Strong, 2017

Custard reformed for an event on 10 December 2009 to celebrate Queensland's 150th birthday, appearing alongside Powderfinger and a number of other local acts.

Since reforming, the band have played one or two gigs per year. In 2010 they appeared at the Meredith Music Festival. They also performed as a headliner act for Float On: A Brisbane Flood Relief Benefit in February 2011, a show to raise money for the victims of the floods in Queensland. In 2011 Custard were featured as part of the Brisbane Festival.

=== 2015–2019: Come Back, All Is Forgiven and The Common Touch ===
Custard released their first album of new material since 1999's Loverama, on 6 November 2015, entitled Come Back, All Is Forgiven, through ABC Music.

In 2017, Custard released The Common Touch, featuring the singles "In the Grand Scheme of Things" and "2000 Woman".

In August 2018, to promote a short tour the group undertook that September, the group released The Band: Live in the Basement, a recording of a concert performed on 9 November 2017 at the Basement club in Sydney.

=== 2020–present: Respect All Lifeforms and Suburban Curtains ===
On 19 March 2020, Custard released the new single "Funky Again", and announced their eighth studio album Respect All Lifeforms. The album was released on 22 May.

In September 2023, Custard announced on their social media pages that pre-production on a new album has started. 15 August 2024 saw the release of a new single, "Molecules Colliding", announced as the first single off the band's ninth album, Suburban Curtains, with a supporting tour to follow in November 2024.

== Discography ==
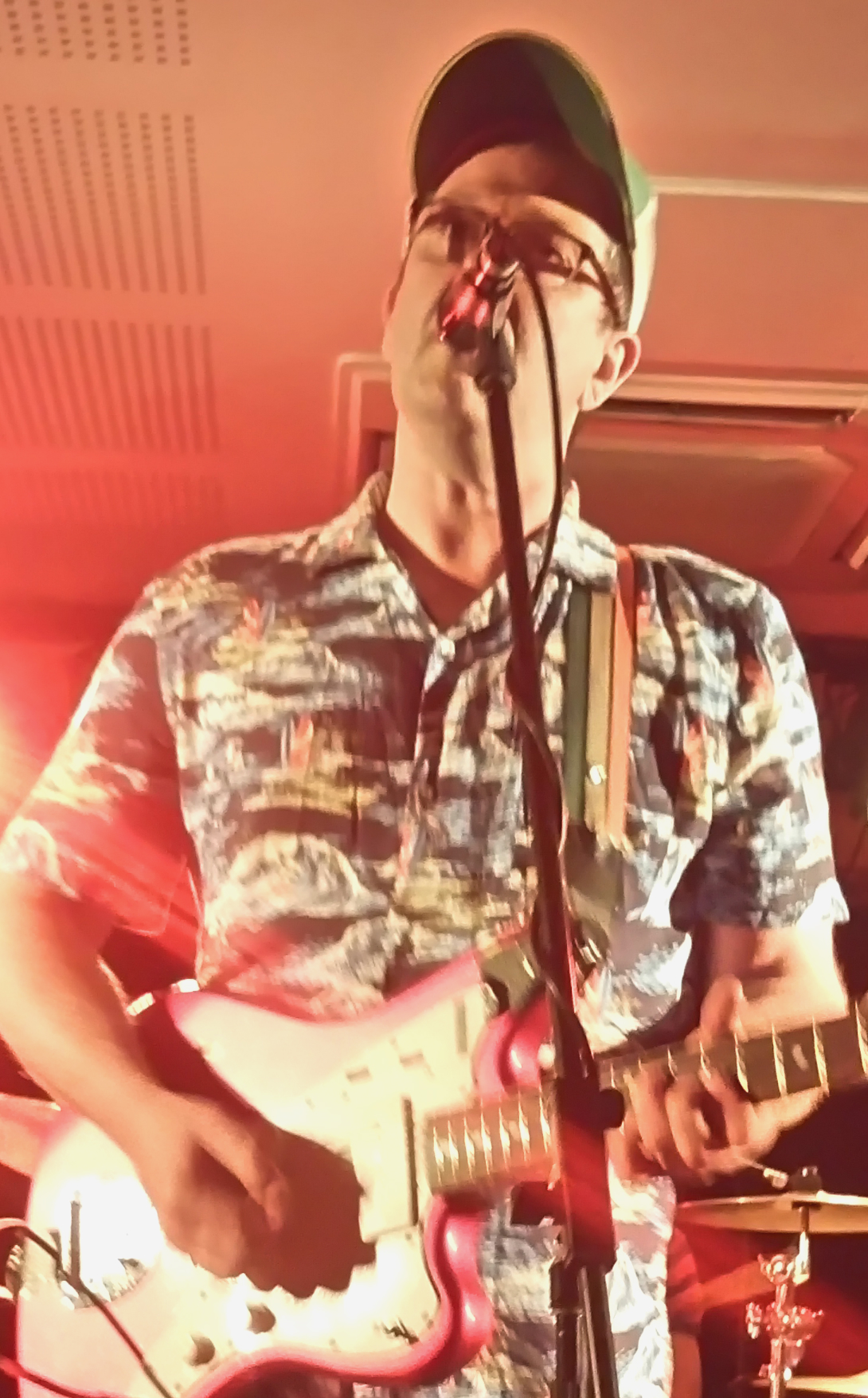
McCormack, 2017

=== Studio albums ===
List of studio albums, with selected chart positions and certifications
Title	Album details	Peak chart positions	Certifications
Title	Album details	AUS	Certifications
Buttercup/Bedford	Released: 1992; Label: Custard; Formats: CD, Cassette	—	
Wahooti Fandango	Released: September 1994; Label: Ra Records (4509976762); Formats: CD, Cassette	89	
Wisenheimer	Released: November 1995; Label: Ra Records (2068300007); Formats: CD	55	
We Have the Technology	Released: September 1997; Label: Ra Records, BMG (74321510192); Formats: CD, LP	36	ARIA: Gold
Loverama	Released: June 1999; Label: Ra Records, BMG (74321671072); Formats: CD, CD-ROM	19	ARIA: Gold
Come Back, All Is Forgiven	Released: 6 November 2015; Label: ABC Music, UMA (4758624); Formats: CD, digital download, streaming, LP	71	
The Common Touch	Released: 6 October 2017; Label: ABC Music, UMA (496293); Formats: CD, digital download, streaming, LP	—	
Respect All Lifeforms	Released: 22 May 2020; Label: ABC Music (0878875); Formats: CD, digital download, streaming, LP	33	
Suburban Curtains	Released: 11 October 2024; Label: ABC Music (ABCM0039); Formats: CD, cassette, digital download, streaming, 2×LP	—	

=== Live albums ===
List of live albums with selected details
Title	Album details
The Band (Live in the Basement)	Released: 31 August 2018; Label: Custard, ABC Music; Formats: Digital download

=== Compilation albums ===
List of compilation albums, with selected chart positions
Title	Album details	Peak chart positions
Title	Album details	AUS
Wacked Not Wacky	Released: June 1996; Label: Custard; Formats: CD; Compilation of early recordings, 1991–1992	—
Goodbye Cruel World	Released: 29 May 2000; Label: BMG, Ra Records (74321765732); Formats: 2×CD; Greatest hits album	64
Brisbane 1990–1993	Released: 3 September 2001; Label: Ra Records, BMG (74321868512); Formats: CD; Compilation album comprising EPs Gastanked and Brisbane	—
The Essential	Released: 2010; Label: Sony Music (88697764422); Formats: 2×CD; Greatest hits album	—
'98 Demos	Released: 2011; Label: Custard; Formats: CD; Demo album	—

=== Extended plays ===
List of studio albums, with selected chart positions and certifications
Title	EP details	Peak chart positions
Title	EP details	AUS
Rockfish Anna	Released: November 1990; Label: Round Records (rr001); Formats: 7" LP	—
Gastanked	Released: October 1992; Label: Ra Records (4509907562); Formats: CD	200
Brisbane	Released: February 1993; Label: Ra Records (4509925152); Formats: CD	153

=== Singles ===
Title	Year	Peak chart positions	Album
Title	Year	AUS	Album
"Casanova"	1993	177	non-album single
"Singlette"	1993	173	Wahooti Fandango
"Aloha Tambourinist"	1994	124	Wahooti Fandango
"Pack Yr Suitcases"	1994	149	Wahooti Fandango
"Alone"	1995	113	Wahooti Fandango
"Apartment"	1995	105	Wisenheimer
"Lucky Star"	1996	118	Wisenheimer
"Sunset Strip"	1996	107	Wisenheimer
"Leisuremaster"	1996	115	Wisenheimer
"Nice Bird"	1997	108	We Have the Technology
"Anatomically Correct"	1997	140	We Have the Technology
"Music Is Crap"	1997	73	We Have the Technology
"Girls Like That (Don't Go For Guys Like Us)"	1998	52	Loverama
"Hit Song"	1999	60	Loverama
"Ringo (I Feel Like)"	1999	118	Loverama
"The New Matthew"	1999	98	Loverama
"Monday / What Am I Gonna Do"	2015	—	non-album single
"We Are the Parents (Our Parents Warned Us About)"	2015	—	Come Back, All Is Forgiven
"Rice & Beans"	2016	—	Come Back, All Is Forgiven
"In the Grand Scheme of Things (None of This Really Matters)"	2017	—	The Common Touch
"2000 Woman"	2017	—	The Common Touch
"Funky Again"	2020	—	Respect All Lifeforms
"The Min Min Lights"	2020	—	Respect All Lifeforms
"Couple's Fight"	2020	—	Respect All Lifeforms
"Take the Skinheads Bowling"	2020	—	Respect All Lifeforms
"Molecules Colliding"	2024	—	Suburban Curtians
"Someday" (featuring Serena Ryder)	2024	—	Suburban Curtians
"Heart Attacks"	2024	—	Suburban Curtians

== Awards ==
=== ARIA Music Awards ===
The ARIA Music Awards is an annual awards ceremony that recognises excellence, innovation, and achievement across all genres of Australian music. Custard have won one award from three nominations.

Year	Nominee / work	Award	Result
1995	Wahooti Fandango	Best Alternative Release	Nominated
1996	Wisenheimer	Best Independent Release	Nominated
1999	Andrew Lancaster & David McCormack for "Girls Like That (Don't Go for Guys Like Us)" by Custard	Best Video	Won
