= Adele&Glenn =

Australian musical group

Adele&Glenn are a two-piece band from Sydney. They are Adele Pickvance and Glenn Thompson, formerly the rhythm section of the reformed Go-Betweens. Their first album Carrington Street was recorded in 2011 at Glenn Thompson's Horses Of Australia studio in Marrickville.
