= Andrew Lancaster =

Australian film director

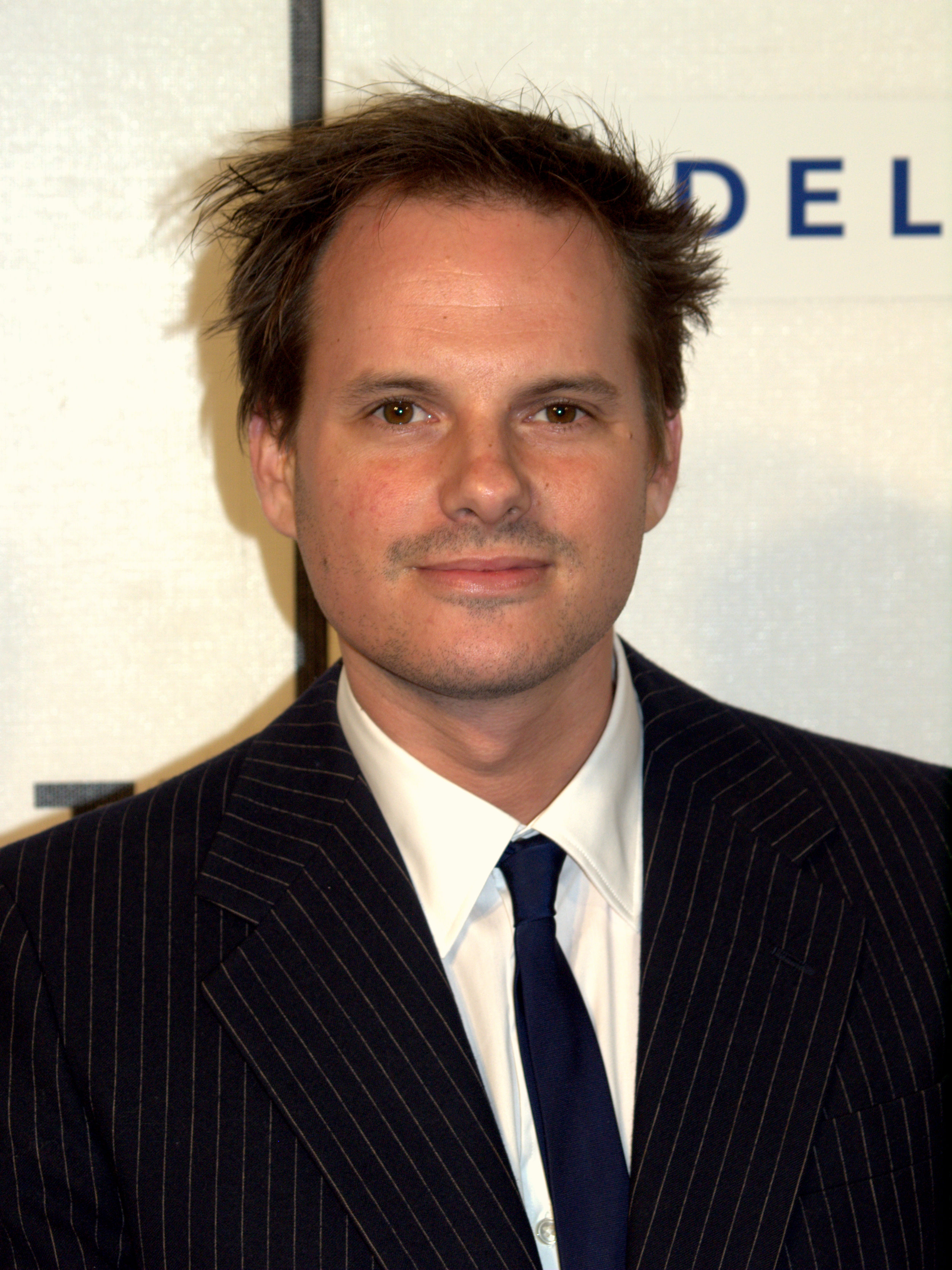
Lancaster at the 2009 premiere of Accidents Happen.

Andrew Lancaster is an Australian film director.

At the Asia-Pacific Film Festival, he won the "Best Short Film" award in 1993 for Palace Cafe and the "Best Film Award" in 2002 for In Search of Mike. His 2014 documentary The Lost Aviator premiered at the London Film Festival. Joud (2018), based in Saudi Arabia, has been noted for its absence of dialogue.

== Filmography ==
- Palace Cafe (1993)
- Universal Appliance (1994)
- In Search of Mike (2000)
- Syntax Error (2003)
- Accidents Happen (2009)
- The Lost Aviator (2014)
- Joud (2018)

== Awards and nominations ==
=== ARIA Music Awards ===
The ARIA Music Awards is an annual awards ceremony that recognises excellence, innovation, and achievement across all genres of Australian music. They commenced in 1987.

Year	Nominee / work	Award	Result	Ref.
1996	Andrew Lancaster for "Soldiers" by You Am I	Best Video	Won	
1999	Andrew Lancaster and David McCormack for "Girls Like That (Don't Go For Guys Like Us)" by Custard	Best Video	Won	
