= David Hunt (judge) =

Australian judge (1935–2019)

Judge of the International Criminal Tribunal for the former Yugoslavia
- In office 16 November 1998 – 14 November 2003

Personal details
- Born: 5 February 1935
- Died: 19 July 2019 (aged 84)

David Anthony Hunt AO, QC (15 February 1935 – 19 July 2019) was an Australian judge who served on the Supreme Court of New South Wales, where he was the Chief Judge at Common Law, and the Judicial Commission of New South Wales. Subsequent to his retirement in 1998, Justice Hunt joined the International Criminal Tribunal for the former Yugoslavia (where he signed the warrant for the arrest of Slobodan Milošević). Gabrielle Louise McIntyre served as his legal adviser at the ICTY.

He studied arts and law at the University of Queensland.

Justice Hunt was appointed an Officer of the Order of Australia in the 2000 Australia Day Honours for "service to the judiciary, to the law and to the community particularly in the areas of criminal law, the law of defamation, and international law in defence of human rights".

Justice Hunt is remembered as the judge who sentenced serial killer Ivan Milat.

== Personal life ==
Justice Hunt was the father of political satirist Simon Hunt, sometimes known as Pauline Pantsdown.
