= Come Back, All Is Forgiven =

Come Back, All is Forgiven

Studio album by Custard
- Released: 6 November 2015
- Recorded: February 2015; Horses of Australia Studio, Marrickville, New South Wales
- Genre: Pop; rock
- Length: 39:56
- Label: ABC Music
- Producer: Custard

Custard chronology
Loverama (1999)	Come Back, All is Forgiven (2015)	The Common Touch (2017)

Singles from Come Back, All is Forgiven
- 1. "We Are The Parents (Our Parents Warned Us About)" Released: September 2015

Come Back, All is Forgiven is the sixth album by Australian band Custard, and their first new material in 16 years. It was released on 6 November 2015 through ABC Music on CD, vinyl, and digital. The album features the classic line-up of David McCormack, Glenn Thompson, Paul Medew and Matthew Strong. The songs were tracked at Horses of Australia Studio on a weekend in February 2015. Overdubs were later added by David at Sonar Studio and Glenn at Horses of Australia Studio. Glenn mixed it over the following couple of months.

The single "We Are The Parents (Our Parents Warned Us About)" was released to radio in September 2015.

== Track listing ==
No.	Title	Length
1.	"Orchids in Water"	2:59
2.	"We Are the Parents (Our Parents Warned Us About)"	3:52
3.	"Warren Rd"	2:48
4.	"Record Machine"	3:03
5.	"If You Would Like To"	1:03
6.	"1990's"	4:52
7.	"Contemporary Art"	2:27
8.	"Queensland University"	2:12
9.	"Rice & Beans"	4:11
10.	"Factual"	5:10
11.	"Get in Your Car"	7:54
Total length:		39:56

== Charts ==
Chart (2015)	Peak position
Australian Albums (ARIA)	71
