= David McCormack =

Australian musician (born 1968)

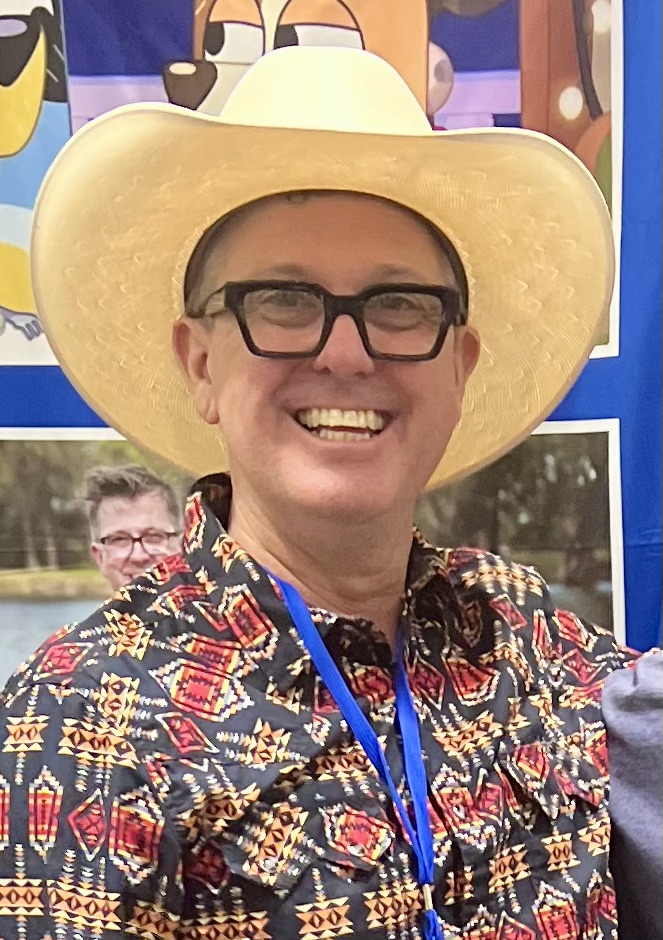
- McCormack at SacAnime in 2024

Background information
- Born: David Liam McCormack; 25 October 1968 (age 58); Brisbane, Queensland, Australia
- Origin: Brisbane
- Genres: Art rock; indie rock; pop; country
- Occupations: Musician; singer; songwriter; voice actor
- Instruments: Vocals; guitar; keyboards; drums; sitar; synth; bass; trumpet; piano; harmonica
- Works: Bluey (2018-present)
- Years active: 1986–present (as musician, singer, and songwriter); 2018–present (as voice actor)
- Labels: Das Kong; ABC Music; rooArt; BMG; Laughing Outlaw
- Member of: Custard; David McCormack & the Polaroids
- Formerly of: Who's Gerald?; COW; Calf; Computor; Frank 'n' Stein; Miami; Adults Today; The Titanics; The Millionaires

David Liam McCormack (born 25 October 1968) is an Australian musician, singer, songwriter, and voice actor. He is best known for voicing the character Bandit Heeler in the Peabody Award-winning animated children's series Bluey and as the frontman of the Brisbane-based rock group Custard.

== Career ==
=== 1986–1989: Early groups ===
McCormack grew up in the west Brisbane suburb of Kenmore, Queensland, and attended Ipswich Grammar School. He started his musical career as a vocalist and guitarist in Brisbane blues hip hop rock outfit Who's Gerald? in 1986. The band included schoolteachers Paul Medew on bass guitar and Glen Donald on keyboards, and they later recruited Cathy Atthow on drums. They released a cassette, Who's Gerald's Greatest Hits, in the same year on their own Gerald Corp Records. In March 1988, they released a single, "Wrestle Wrestle" and had the track "Pins and Needles" on that year's Youngblood compilation.

Atthow, McCormack and Medew briefly formed Automatic Graphic in 1988 with Scott Younger.

=== 1989–2000, 2009–present: Custard ===
In 1989, McCormack and Medew formed Custard Gun with Shane Brunn (later in Hugbubble, Vanlustbader) on drums and James Straker (later in Melniks). After a number of performances, Straker left in early 1990, the band was renamed Custard, and Straker was replaced at year's end by Matthew Strong on guitar.

Custard existed for about a decade, with a number of different drummers including Gavin Herrenberg, Danny Plant, John Lowry and Glenn Thompson (later of The Go-Betweens). The band released five studio albums in the 1990s: Buttercup/Bedford, Wahooti Fandango, Wisenheimer, We Have the Technology and Loverama, a number of EPs and singles and a greatest hits compilation entitled Goodbye Cruel World. A DVD video clip compilation called The Spaces by the Side of the Road – A Digital History of Custard was released in 2007.

Custard reformed for a concert on 10 December 2009, as part of the Queensland Proclamation Day, 150th Anniversary Celebrations.

Custard released a new album in November 2015, entitled Come Back, All Is Forgiven, which was followed by 2017's The Common Touch.

The single 'Funky Again' was released in March 2020, ahead of the band's eighth studio album Respect All Lifeforms.

The single 'Molecules Colliding' was released in August 2024 along with 'Someday' in September 2024. In October 2024 the album Suburban Curtains.

==== Other 1990s bands ====
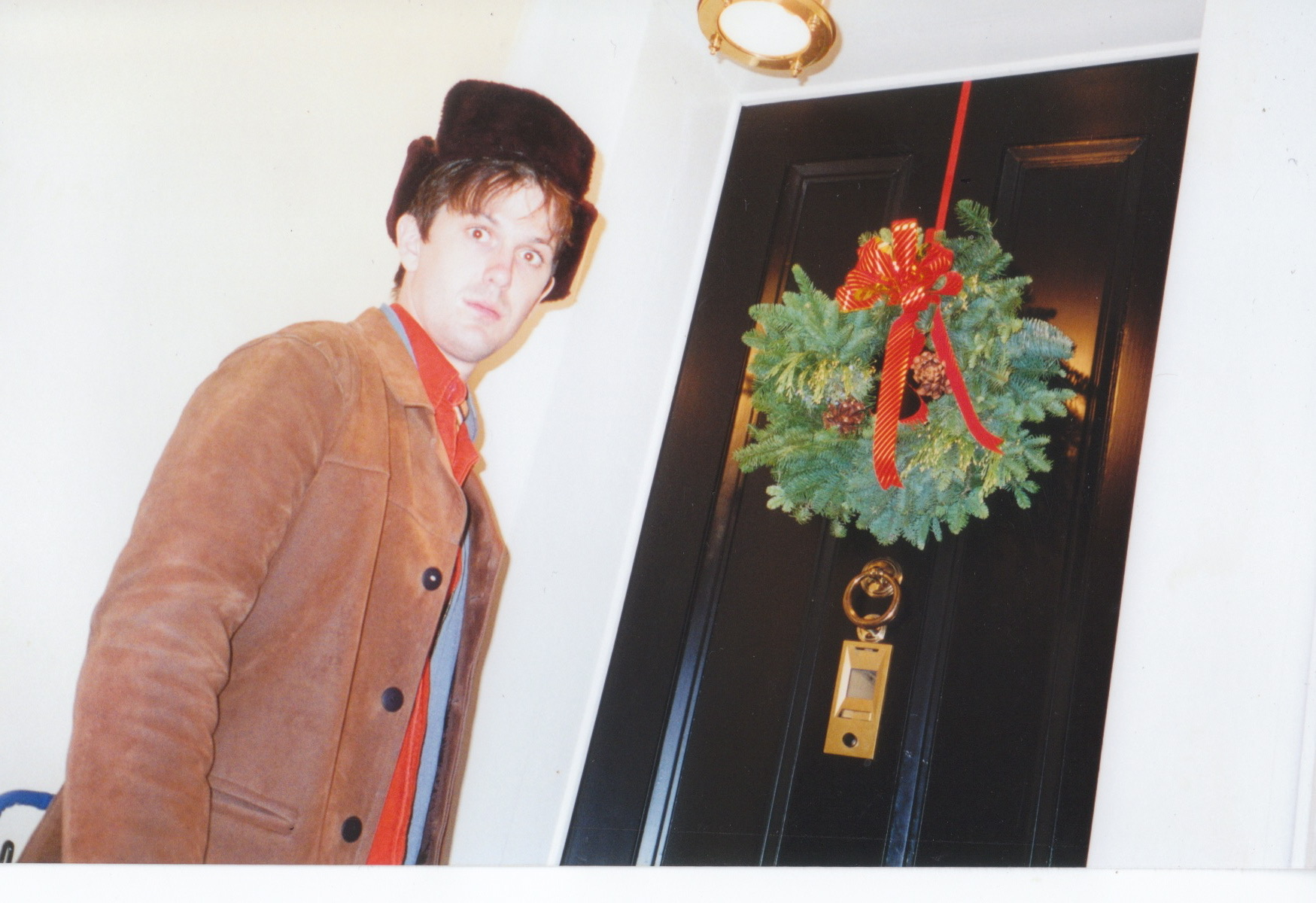
McCormack, 1990s

During the 1990s, McCormack was moonlighting in other bands that formed in and around Custard's practice rooms. The Cows from 1993 (later styled as COW or C.O.W. – for Country or Western) had Thompson and Robert Moore on bass guitar; as well as Maureen Hansen on vocals, Susie Hansen on vocals and Mark Lowry (twin brother of John Lowry) on bass guitar by 1995. COW released Beard in June 1996.

McCormack, Moore and Thompson recorded with Robert Forster (ex-The Go-Betweens) for his second solo album, Calling from a Country Phone, released in 1993 and toured with Forster as Silver Backwash.

Frank 'n' Stein from 1995 had Moore and McCormack join with his brother Dylan McCormack (ex-Biro) and Ian Wadley. Miami, also from 1995, had Maureen Hansen (also in COW and McCormack's then girlfriend), Nick Naughton on drums and Medew. Miami released two CDs: Costume of Sand (March 1997) and Feel the Seed (1998). Computor was another collaboration between McCormack and Moore, which was electronic sounding and they released a tape called Floppy Disk.

=== 2000–2017: Solo releases, The Titanics, and The Polaroids ===
Around the time Custard broke up, McCormack formed The Titanics with his then-wife Emma Tom, Glenn Thompson and filmmaker Tina Havelock Stevens. During their three-year run, they had at least seven releases: debut album Size Isn't Everything (2000), its few alternate variations, and final album Love Is The Devil (September 2000) which spawned two singles: "Set The Controls For The Heart Of The Sun" (2000) and "Shoulda" (2001).

In 2002, McCormack released a solo album of electronic songs, The Matterhorn.

In 2002, McCormack recruited a backing band called The Polaroids. Together, they released the albums Candy (2002) and The Truth About Love (2004), and the DVD Save Dave: David McCormack and the Polaroids Live At The Hopetoun Hotel Sydney June 2003 (2003, DVD). McCormack reunited with The Polaroids in February 2024 to record 8 songs. This collection was released in June 2024 as a vinyl only EP called “Get Old” on his label Das Kong.

In 2006, McCormack was one of the two weekly 'mystery' guests on the Australian television show RocKwiz on SBS One.

In November 2006, under the guidance of JJJ, McCormack assembled a band to perform a concert at the Tivoli in Brisbane as a tribute for the late Grant McLennan of The Go-Betweens. Early in 2007, McCormack then went into the studio to produce a tribute album to the band, called Write Your Adventures Down.

In October 2009, McCormack released the album Little Murders.

Since 2009, McCormack has been responsible for many film and television scores including The Tall Man, Rake, Redfern Now, House Husbands, Wild Boys, and Blood Brothers. Additionally, McCormack has also composed film scores for Alex Proyas's Garage Days in 2002, and for Daniel Krige's West in 2006.

=== 2018–present: Voice acting ventures ===
Since 2018, McCormack has starred in the critically acclaimed ABC Kids Australian animated television series Bluey, voicing the titular character's father, Bandit Heeler. He was initially approached to read what he assumed would be merely "a couple of lines," only to voice the character for the entirety of the pilot. McCormack performs his voice work for the series remotely in Sydney, and his voice recordings are then sent to the production company in Brisbane. He does not hear any other voice actors or view footage while recording, and does not alter his own voice to produce Bandit's dialogue. The series won a Peabody Award at the 84th ceremony for "its unparalleled ability to seamlessly unite childhood bliss with meaningful life lessons." McCormack is set to reprise his role as Bandit in the upcoming film adaptation, slated for release in August 2027.

In 2023, he voiced the character Orbo in the HBO Max American adult animated television series Adventure Time: Fionna and Cake.

In 2025, he narrated the Penny Pangolin series of children's audiobooks by Wayne D. Kramer, based on the children's picture books published by Heroes of Time Productions.

== Discography ==
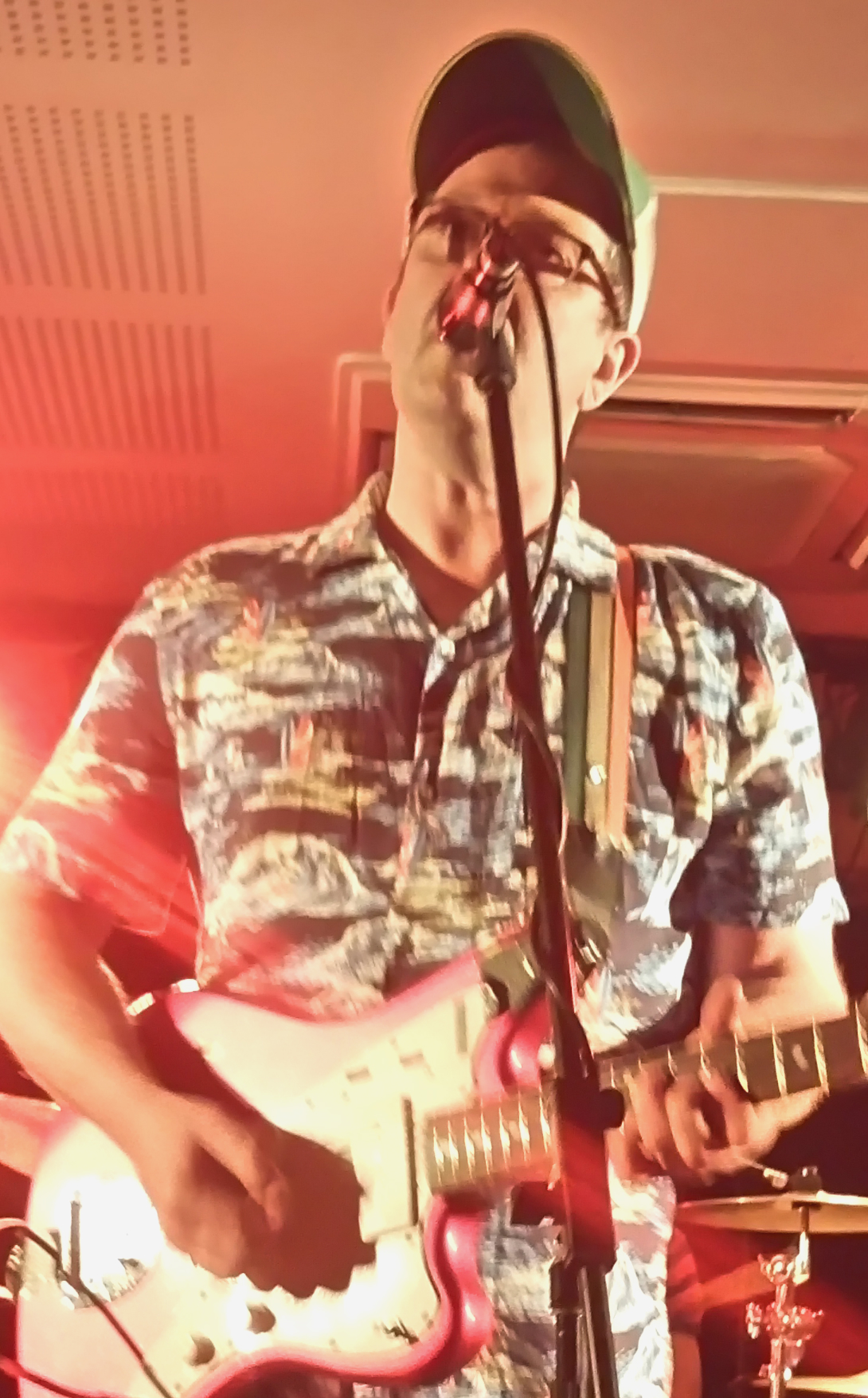
McCormack performing in 2017

=== Albums ===
List of albums, with selected details
Title	Details
The Matterhorn	Released: 21 January 2002; Format: CD; Label: Das Kong
Candy (as David McCormack and the Polaroids)	Released: August 2002; Format: CD; Label: Das Kong Pty Ltd
The Truth About Love (as David McCormack and the Polaroids)	Released: 2004; Format: CD, LP; Label: Laughing Outlaw Records
Little Murders	Released: 2 October 2009; Format: CD, digital; Label: Das Kong
Get Old (as David McCormack and the Polaroids)	Released: 2024; Format: LP, digital; Label: Das Kong
A Complete History of Popular Music (as David McCormack and the Polaroids)	Released: 17 October 2025; Format: LP, cassette, digital; Label: Das Kong
No Context for Old Men (as David McCormack's TRS-80)	Released: 3 July 2026; Format: CD, 7-inch, digital; Label: Valve Records

== Filmography ==
Year	Title	Role
1996	Dead Heart	Justin
2000–2001	Pizza	Spriuker, Middle Class Homeboy
2002	Garage Days	Himself (with The Titanics)
2005	Blue Water High	The Band
2005	headLand	David McCormack & The Juicy Fruits
2012	Rake	Rock Band
2018–present	Bluey	Bandit Heeler (voice)
2020	Heroes Of Goo Jit Zu	Terrack (voice)
2023–present	Adventure Time: Fionna and Cake	Orbo (voice)
2027	The Bluey Movie	Bandit Heeler (voice)

== Awards and nominations ==
=== ARIA Music Awards ===
The ARIA Music Awards is an annual awards ceremony held by the Australian Recording Industry Association. They commenced in 1987.

Year	Nominee / work	Award	Result	Ref.
1999	Andrew Lancaster and David McCormack for "Girls Like That (Don't Go For Guys Like Us)" by Custard	Best Video	Won	

== Sources ==
- McFarlane, Ian (1999). "Whammo Homepage". Encyclopedia of Australian Rock and Pop. St Leonards, NSW: Allen & Unwin. ISBN 1-86508-072-1. Archived from the original on 10 October 2004. Note: Archived [on-line] copy has limited functionality.
- Spencer, Chris; Zbig Nowara, Paul McHenry with notes by Ed Nimmervoll (2002) [1987]. The Who's Who of Australian Rock. Noble Park, Vic.: Five Mile Press. ISBN 1-86503-891-1. Note: [on-line] version established at White Room Electronic Publishing Pty Ltd in 2007 and was expanded from the 2002 edition.
