= Kong Foo Sing =

1996 single by Regurgitator

- Cassette cover

Single by Regurgitator

from the album Tu-Plang
- Released: April 1996
- Recorded: 1995
- Length: 2:58
- Label: Warner Music Australasia
- Songwriter: Quan Yeomans
- Producers: Magoo, Regurgitator

Regurgitator singles chronology
"F.S.O." (1996)	"Kong Foo Sing" (1996)	"Miffy's Simplicity" (1996)

"Kong Foo Sing" is a song by Australian rock band Regurgitator. The song was released in April 1996 as the second single and first single from the band's debut studio album Tu-Plang. The single peaked at number 33 in Australia. The song ranked at number 15 on Triple J's Hottest 100 in 1996.

Ben Ely said "the song was about how Quan Yeomans had sent Janet [English] from Spiderbait a box of the Kong Foo Sing fortune cookies in an effort to get her to go out with him."

== Reception ==
In 2019, Tyler Jenke from The Brag ranked Regurgitator's best songs, with "Kong Foo Sing" coming it at number 2 (behind ! (The Song Formerly Known As)). Jenke said "An ode to the fortune cookie, 'Kong Foo Sing' managed to see Regurgitator become something of a household name in the world of alt-rock. Pairing catchy lyrics, samples from kung-fu films, and a crushing rhythm section, there was no doubting that this one would go on to become one of their most successful moments." Andrew Stafford, in Pig City, called it "monstrous funk-metal, Lee's drums miked to sound more like garbage pails".

== Track listings ==
CD Single
No.	Title	Length
1.	"Kong Foo Sing"	2:58
2.	"Blood Dub"	4:29
3.	"Ronald's Labotomy"	0:57

== Charts ==
Chart (1996)	Peak position
Australia (ARIA)	33

== Release history ==
Region	Date	Format	Label	Catalogue
Australia	April 1996	CD Single, Cassingle	EastWest, Warner	0630145882
