= Everyday Formula =

1997 single by Regurgitator

Single by Regurgitator

from the album Unit
- B-side: "Asiatic Fever"; "Everyday (Boom Boom Blend)"
- Released: October 1997
- Length: 2:11
- Label: EastWest
- Songwriter: Quan Yeomans
- Producers: Magoo; Regurgitator

Regurgitator singles chronology
"I Sucked a Lot of Cock to Get Where I Am" (1996)	"Everyday Formula" (1997)	"Black Bugs" (1998)

Music video
- "Everyday Formula" on YouTube

"Everyday Formula" is a song by Australian rock band Regurgitator. The song was released in October 1997 as the lead single from the band's second studio album Unit. The single peaked at number 41 in Australia and was ranked number 19 on Triple J's Hottest 100 in 1997.

In 2019, Tyler Jenke from The Brag ranked Regurgitator's best songs, with "Everyday Formula" coming it at number four. Jenke said "Like most songs by the Gurge, the exceptional, catchy music hides some lyrics underneath that usually go missed by casual fans of the band. In this case, 'Everyday Formula' sees the group describing environmental issues being overlooked due to the rise of technology. Truly, they were ahead of their time."

== Music video ==
The song's music video is heavily inspired by the 1982 film Tron and recreates several scenes from the film. The music video sees frontman Quan Yeomans being digitised by a laser and transported into a computer world where he is forced to compete in the ball game from the film.

== Track listings ==
Australian CD Single
No.	Title	Length
1.	"Everyday Formula"	2:10
2.	"Asiatic Fever"	4:18
3.	"Everyday (Boom Boom Blend)"	3:07

== Charts ==
Chart (1997)	Peak position
Australia (ARIA)	41

== Release history ==
Region	Date	Format	Label	Catalogue
Australia	October 1997	CD single	EastWest	398420747-2
