= Wisenheimer =

Studio album by Custard
- Released: November 6, 1995
- Recorded: July 1995
- Studio: Hyde St., San Francisco
- Genre: Pop, rock
- Length: 38:24
- Label: rooArt
- Producer: Eric Drew Feldman

Custard chronology
Wahooti Fandango (1994)	Wisenheimer (1995)	We Have The Technology (1997)

Wisenheimer is the third studio album by the Australian band Custard. It was released November 6th 1995 and peaked at number 55 in September 1996. The album contains the song "Apartment" which reached #7 in the third Hottest 100.

== Recording ==
Frontman Dave McCormack later said, "To have the opportunity to go to San Francisco and record with Eric Drew Feldman in Hyde St Studios – where Creedence had recorded and Green Day were recording – that was massive. We were there for months. It was very premium, professional, proper band stuff. We landed on the 4th of July, 1995 and went straight to the supermarket. You could buy booze at the supermarket. It was a huge culture shock. The cheese was orange and the butter was white."

Elsewhere, McCormack added, "The whole thing cost $140000. It was recoupable, but it didn't matter as we got out of our contract. My theory always was to spend every cent you can, and then just walk away from the flaming bridges afterward."

McCormack also had a problem with his rhythm section. He said, "Those guys were just out of it all the time. Green Day were recording upstairs and they were doing bucket bongs all day and playing pool." Plant was sacked soon after.

== Reception ==
Rolling Stone Australia said, "Songs like 'Apartment' and 'Sunset Strip' have been fashioned with melody, imagination and undeniable craft and Eric Drew Feldman's production comes close to capturing the skill and energy of Custard live. Custard aren't about to stop making you smile, but that doesn't mean they're not serious."

Andrew Stafford, in Pig City, said, "If the album lacked its predecessor's rambling charm, it also contained some brilliant material."

Manager, Dave Brown, blamed some of the lack of sales on the choice of first single. "It was always my bitch that they released "Apartment" at the wrong time, and that was the difference between a successful album versus a really successful album. It was too good for that."

== Track listing ==
Credits adapted from the CD liner notes.

No.	Title	Writer(s)	Length
1.	"Goofinder"	David McCormack, Dylan McCormack	2:32
2.	"The Golden Age of Nicotine"	McCormack	0:48
3.	"Sunset Strip"	McCormack, Dylan McCormack	2:23
4.	"Leisuremaster"	McCormack	2:50
5.	"Love Measurer"	McCormack, Matthew Strong	3:35
6.	"Cut Lunch"	McCormack	0:42
7.	"Apartment"	McCormack, Paul Medew, Danny Plant, Strong	2:24
8.	"I Love the Television"	McCormack, Strong	2:11
9.	"Venus Flytrap and Lightning Bug"	McCormack	1:56
10.	"A Job In Rock 'n' Roll"	McCormack	2:27
11.	"The Synthesiser Is Rapidly Overtaking the Guitar as the Most Popular Instrument in the World"	McCormack, Strong	2:14
12.	"Dreamer"	McCormack, Medew	1:54
13.	"Lucky Star"	McCormack	2:32
14.	"Gazebo"	McCormack	2:57
15.	"Columbus"	McCormack	3:11
16.	"Do It Again"	McCormack, Medew, Plant, Strong	3:56
Total length:			38:24

== Charts ==
Chart (1995/96)	Peak position
Australian Albums (ARIA)	55

== Release History ==
Region	Date	Format(s)	Label	Catalogue
Australia	November 6, 1995	CD	Ra Records, Warner Music Australia	2068300007
Australia	1996	CD	Ra Records, Shock Records	2068300049
Australia	April 14, 1997	CD	Ra Records, BMG	74321437922
