= Black Bugs =

1998 single by Regurgitator

- Australian artwork

Single by Regurgitator

from the album Unit
- B-side: "Living in the City"; "Live at the Drive In"
- Released: January 1998
- Length: 3:02
- Label: EastWest
- Songwriter: Ben Ely
- Producers: Magoo; Regurgitator

Regurgitator singles chronology
"Everyday Formula" (1997)	"Black Bugs" (1998)	"Polyester Girl" (1998)

Music video
- "Black Bugs" on YouTube

Alternative cover
- UK artwork

"Black Bugs" is a song by Australian rock band Regurgitator. It was released in January 1998 as the second single from the band's second studio album, Unit (1997). The single peaked at number 32 in Australia and was ranked at the same position on Triple J's Hottest 100 in 1998. The single also peaked at number 88 in the United Kingdom, becoming Regurgitator's first and only song to enter the top 100 in that country.

== Reception ==
Nick Stillman from Happy Mag said "'Black Bugs' is the perfect archetype of how to create rock music with a metallic heart […] In a nod to 80s pop, the guitars are wrapped in a sheet of shimmering modulation, and the drums reverberate with digital desolation. There's a curling keyboard solo too and a persistent sampled drum track that ties the whole song together."

In 2019, Tyler Jenke from The Brag ranked Regurgitator's best songs, with "Black Bugs" coming in at number nine. Jenke said "'Black Bugs' was something of a timely anthem about being addicted to video games, backed by a computer-generated film clip that made listeners keen to head home, boot up their Nintendo 64, and blast some black bugs."

== Music video ==
The animated music video sees the four members of the band, portrayed as cartoon animals, performing and dancing to the song. It was directed by Regurgitator frontman Quan Yeomans. The video was nominated for Best Video at the 1998 ARIA Music Awards.

== Track listings ==
Australian and UK CD single
No.	Title	Length
1.	"Black Bugs"	3:02
2.	"Living in the City"	3:29
3.	"Live at the Drive In"	1:46

== Charts ==
Chart (1998)	Peak position
Australia (ARIA)	32
UK Singles (OCC)	88

== Release history ==
Region	Date	Format	Label	Catalogue	Ref.
Australia	January 1998	CD	EastWest	3984219182	
United Kingdom	14 September 1998	7-inch vinyl; CD	Coalition; EastWest	COLA 059; COLA 059CD	
