= Polyester Girl =

1998 single by Regurgitator

Single by Regurgitator

from the album Unit
- B-side: "Resuscitator"
- Released: May 1998
- Length: 3:30
- Label: EastWest
- Songwriter: Quan Yeomans
- Producers: Magoo; Regurgitator

Regurgitator singles chronology
"Black Bugs" (1998)	"Polyester Girl" (1998)	"! (The Song Formerly Known As)" / "Modern Life" (1998)

Music video
- "Polyester Girl" on YouTube

"Polyester Girl" is a song by Australian rock band Regurgitator. The song was released in May 1998 as the third single from the band's second studio album Unit. "Polyester Girl" peaked at No. 14 in Australia and No. 16 in New Zealand. It was ranked No. 26 on Triple J's Hottest 100 in 1998.

== Content ==
The release of "Polyester Girl" has been described as the peak of Regurgitator's career; it was their highest selling single and has been credited with helping the album Unit reach sales of over 240,000. The song was a radio hit in Australia, with Allmusic describing it as one of the highlights from the album. "Polyester Girl" has been called a "socially challenging" song, and has also been described as Regurgitator's "anti-commercialism anthem". When questioned if he would have done anything different on the album Unit, Regurgitator frontman Quan Yeomans cited Polyester Girl, stating "it's one of those throwaway things that was done so quickly and so sillily. Maybe I would do that again, but then that's the most successful track we've ever released." Drums and keyboards heard in the song were synthesised using a Roland MC-303. "Polyester Girl" is said to be about a man "pledging fidelity to a sex doll." A "romantic trauma" occurs when the product breaks and has to be sent away for repairs.

== Music video ==
Polyester Girls seen dancing in the music video

The music video was created by Jeremy Hyndes and George Pinn. It was entirely digitally animated, with Rip It Up considering it to have "Nintendo 64" quality graphics. It features a chrome silver female with large breasts and an exaggerated hourglass figure dancing, at times synchronised with two identical figures. Dancing footage is intercut with advertisements to purchase one of the dancing figures, termed a "Polyester Girl". Described in the video as an "All Amazing PETCOM", the Polyester Girl is advertised as being mentally active, being made from elasto-plastic and featuring ionic suspension. The ability to customise a Polyester Girl's facial features, hair and wardrobe are shown, and viewers are encouraged to purchase a 'hover' nail file for their product. The music video was nominated for Best Video at the 1998 ARIA Music Awards.

== Track listings ==
Australian CD single
No.	Title	Length
1.	"Polyester Girl"	3:30
2.	"Polyester Girl" (Rayon Blend)	3:08
3.	"Polyester Girl" (Bass 'n' Garage dub)	6:01
4.	"Resuscitator"	3:30

UK CD single
No.	Title	Length
1.	"Polyester Girl"	3:30
2.	"Polyester Girl" (Rayon Blend)	3:08
3.	"Asiatic Fever"	3:30

== Charts ==
=== Weekly charts ===
Chart (1998)	Peak position
Australia (ARIA)	14
New Zealand (Recorded Music NZ)	16

=== Year-end charts ===
Chart (1998)	Position
Australia (ARIA)	67

== Certification ==
Region	Certification	Certified units/sales
Australia (ARIA)	Gold	35,000^{^}
^{^} Shipments figures based on certification alone.

== Release history ==
Region	Date	Format	Label(s)	Catalogue
Australia	May 1998	CD	EastWest	3984229662
United Kingdom	1998	CD	Coalition, EastWest	COLA 066CD
