= Miffy's Simplicity =

1996 single by Regurgitator

Single by Regurgitator

from the album Tu-Plang
- Released: September 1996
- Recorded: 1995
- Length: 1:30
- Label: Warner Music Australasia
- Songwriter(s): Quan Yeomans
- Producer(s): Magoo, Regurgitator

Regurgitator singles chronology
"Kong Foo Sing" (1996)	"Miffy's Simplicity" (1996)	"I Sucked a Lot of Cock to Get Where I Am" (1996)

"Miffy's Simplicity" is a song by Australian rock band Regurgitator. The song was released in September 1996 as the third and final (commercially released) single from the band's debut studio album Tu-Plang. The single peaked at number 54 in Australia.

The song is a love song Quan Yeomans wrote once he began dating Janet English from Spiderbait. Yeomans said "This is probably the only real love song I have ever written. We stopped playing it for the simple reason that when love affairs end the love songs written about them tend to ring a little hollow for the troubadour whose heart has faltered. I do, however, still really like the song's odd chord progressions, bass tone and its cute, romance lyrics scattered over heavily distorted guitars. It is actually one of the few vocal takes of mine that I think works on the record."

== Track listings ==
CD Single
No.	Title	Length
1.	"Miffy's Simplicity"	1:30
2.	"Pop Porn" (Attacked By the Resin Dog Mix)	4:07
3.	"Son of Sam"	5:53
4.	"Don't Bring Your Devils Home"	2:09

== Charts ==
Chart performance for "Miffy's Simplicity"
Chart (1996)	Peak position
Australia (ARIA)	54

== Release history ==
Region	Date	Format	Label	Catalogue
Australia	September 1996	CD Single	EastWest, Warner	0630165232
