= Loverama =

Studio album by Custard
- Released: June 14, 1999
- Recorded: October–December 1998
- Studio: The Dirty Room, Brisbane; Sing Sing Studios, Melbourne
- Genre: Pop, rock
- Length: 41:54
- Label: BMG; Ra
- Producer: Magoo

Custard chronology
We Have the Technology (1997)	Loverama (1999)	Goodbye Cruel World (2000)

Singles from Album
- 1. "Girls Like That (Don't Go For Guys Like Us)" Released: 5 October 1998; 2. "Hit Song" Released: 12 April 1999; 3. "Ringo (I Feel Like)" Released: 1999; 4. "The New Matthew" Released: 1999

Loverama is the fifth studio album by the Australian band Custard. It was released in June 1999 and peaked at number 19 on the ARIA Charts; the band's highest charting album.

Loverama was the band's final release for 16 years, until 2015's Come Back, All Is Forgiven. Some copies came as a two-CD set, with the companion disc called Custaro Musico.

"Girls Like That (Don't Go For Guys Like Us)", "Ringo (I feel Like...)" and "Hit Song" all featured in a Hottest 100, with Girls... in 1998 and the other two in 1999.

== Reception ==
Rolling Stone Australia at the time of release said, it was noted that the album was less "zany" and more dance-oriented than previous releases, though the "puerile song titles and cock-eyed world view remain." Overall, the album was described as, "top-heavy with infectious ditties."

They also named it the 94th best Australian album in 2021, saying, "Ever-beloved by the alt-rock scene for their quirky style, eccentric compositions, and endearing personalities, Loverama gave the wider public an insight into what had made Custard firm favourites for a decade by that point. Fittingly though, Loverama would end up serving as the group's swansong, with Custard announcing their initial split the following year."

== Track listing ==
All tracks are written by David McCormack, except as noted.

Loverama
No.	Title	Length
1.	"Girls Like That (Don't Go For Guys Like Us)" (David McCormack, Dylan McCormack & Trevor J. Ludlow)	3:11
2.	"Hit Song" (David McCormack, Glenn Thompson, Paul Medew & Matthew Strong)	2:22
3.	"Monkey" (David McCormack, Glenn Thompson, Paul Medew & Matthew Strong)	2:26
4.	"The New Matthew"	4:18
5.	"Ringo (I Feel Like..)"	2:50
6.	"Nervous Breakdance"	3:57
7.	"Funny" (David McCormack & Ian Roy McCormack)	1:57
8.	"Pluto (Pts. 1 & 2)"	2:55
9.	"Almost Like A Song"	3:57
10.	"Correctional Facility Of Love"	4:12
11.	"Genius" (Glenn Thompson)	3:47
12.	"Kinder Whore"	2:50
13.	"Ladies And Gentlemen"	3:22
Total length:		41:54

Custaro Musico
No.	Title	Length
1.	"Umlaut"	2:59
2.	"No Te Escribi Ninguna Cancion"	2:18
3.	"Pablo Tiene Novia"	1:53
4.	"Gato De Nueve Colas"	1:14
5.	"Nervoisa Danzarota II"	5:00
Total length:		13:22

== Charts ==
Chart (1999)	Peak position
Australian Albums (ARIA)	19
