= F.S.O. =

1996 single by Regurgitator

Single by Regurgitator

from the album Tu-Plang
- Released: February 1996
- Recorded: 1995
- Length: 1:39
- Label: Warner Music Australasia
- Songwriter: Quan Yeomans
- Producers: Magoo, Regurgitator

Regurgitator singles chronology
"Blubber Boy" (1995)	"F.S.O." (1996)	"Kong Foo Sing" (1996)

"F.S.O." (abbreviation of Fuck Shit Off) is a song by Australian rock band Regurgitator. The song was released in February 1996 as the band's first commercially released single and first single from the band's debut studio album Tu-Plang. The single peaked at number 51 in Australia.

== Details ==
Ben Ely said, "Quan wrote this about his sister-in-law and how she got married to this guy who turned out to be a brute and was violent with her. This song is his anger at the situation. I love how it sounds like an angry song, though it's a song about not tolerating someone else's anger."

Quan Yeomans said, "I was never particularly thrilled with my vocals on this one, but it has a punk urgency and ugliness about it that is apt for the idea behind it."

== Reception ==
Andrew Stafford, in Pig City, called it "more statement than single. Ninety-three seconds of blistering hardcore buried in the middle of 18 minutes of feedback. Many fans returned or sold their copies, unsure what exactly they'd spent their money on."

== Track listings ==
CD single
No.	Title	Length
1.	"F.S.O." (Slo Motion Replay)	18:00

Promo CD single
No.	Title	Length
1.	"F.S.O."	1:39

== Charts ==
Chart performance for "F.S.O."
Chart (1996)	Peak position
Australia (ARIA)	51

== Release history ==
Region	Date	Format	Label	Catalogue
Australia	February 1996	CD Single	EastWest, Warner	0630139772
