= Music Is Crap =

Single by Custard

from the album We Have the Technology
- Released: February 16, 1998
- Genre: Pop, rock
- Length: 12:15
- Label: rooArt
- Songwriters: David McCormack, Glenn Thompson, Paul Medew, Matthew Strong
- Producer: Eric Drew Feldman

Custard singles chronology
"Anatomically Correct" (1997)	"Music Is Crap" (1998)	"Girls Like That (Don't Go For Guys Like Us)" (1998)

"Music Is Crap" is the third single from We Have the Technology, the fourth album by Custard. It reached #73 on the Australian ARIA singles chart, and No. 24 on the 1998 Hottest 100.

== Lyrics ==
The song was written and sung by lead drummer Glenn Thompson. Thompson would later say, "Ah ha! No look, I was kinda riffing on the idea of being very introspective, saying the vehicle that you are making your art, your art form is rubbish but at the same time you’re loving it. Ha ha, I just thought how punk is that?". Custard frontman David McCormack noted that when Thompson joined Custard, "He already had "Music Is Crap" and a couple of other great songs which he was playing in another band around Brisbane called Adults Today which sometimes transformed into Adolf Today or Control Group. It was always the same band members but with different names."

== Critical reception ==
The song is often credited with reinvigorating public interest in Custard. Craig Mathieson for The Sydney Morning Herald wrote, "Glenn Thompson specializes in plaintive songs whose sweet melodies mask bittersweet jibes. This is one of his standout efforts". Music critic Noel Mengel named the song the 43rd best from the state of Queensland in 2013.

== Track listing ==
No.	Title	Length
1.	"Music Is Crap"	3:04
2.	"Re-Memory Man"	3:09
3.	"Totally Confused" (Take One)	3:07
4.	"Anatomically Correct" (Take One)	2:53

== Charts ==
Chart (1998)	Peak position
Australia (ARIA)	73
