= Brisbane 1990–1993 =

Compilation album by Custard
- Released: September 3, 2001
- Recorded: 1990–1993
- Studios: Broken Toys Studio, Kangaroo Point, Brisbane; Sunshine Studios, Brisbane
- Genres: Pop, rock
- Length: 38:30
- Label: Ra Records / BMG
- Producers: Custard; Wayne Connolly; Robert Moore

Custard chronology
Goodbye Cruel World (2000)	Brisbane 1990–1993 (2001)	The Essential (2010)

Brisbane 1990–1993 is a compilation of the two early 1990s EPs by the Australian band Custard, Gastanked and Brisbane.

== Track listing ==
No.	Title	Length
1.	"Edie"	3:05
2.	"Bedford"	2:25
3.	"Satellite"	1:54
4.	"I Just Want To Be With You"	2:29
5.	"Nude"	3:01
6.	"Minder"	2:58
7.	"Nightmare Two"	2:52
8.	"Downtown"	3:24
9.	"Sarsaparilla"	1:50
10.	"Weirdo"	3:04
11.	"Mouth Crazy"	3:20
12.	"Short Pop Song"	1:14
13.	"Spring Hill Theme"	3:37
14.	"My Name Is Paul Medew"	3:25
Total length:		38:30
