= Tu-Plang =

1996 studio album by Regurgitator

Studio album by Regurgitator
- Released: 6 May 1996
- Recorded: Sunshine Studio & Red Zeds, Brisbane, February 1996; Center Stage Studios, Bangkok, Thailand, March 1996
- Genres: Alternative rock; alternative hip hop; rap rock
- Length: 40:58
- Labels: East West, Warner Music Australia
- Producer: Magoo

Regurgitator chronology
New (1995)	Tu-Plang (1996)	Unit (1997)

Singles from Tu-Plang
- 1. "F.S.O." Released: February 1996; 2. "Kong Foo Sing" Released: April 1996; 3. "Miffy's Simplicity" Released: September 1996; 4. "I Sucked a Lot of Cock to Get Where I Am" Released: November 1996 (international release)

Tu-Plang (ตู้เพลง Thai for Jukebox) is the debut studio album released by Australian rock band Regurgitator. It was released in Australia in May 1996, where it sold well despite receiving little radio airplay. It was later released in the United States on 22 April 1997 through Reprise/Warner Bros.

At the ARIA Music Awards of 1996, the album won two awards; Best Alternative Album and Breakthrough Artist - Album. In 2012, Regurgitator performed the entire album along with Unit on the Australian RetroTech tour.

== Background and recording ==
After making two EPs, the band chose to record the album in Bangkok, Thailand, to the quandary of its label, Warner Music, which was uncertain as to what terms A&R executive Michael Parisi had contracted. Ely later said, "We didn't want to do it in just any old place, so we had a tour in Europe and Japan booked and our drummer Martin said, 'let's stop in Thailand on the way and check out some studios,' so we did and we found this place."

Producer Magoo later said the studio, "was [owned by] this guy [who was in the band] Carabao. He was described to us as the local Thai Bruce Springsteen. He had this compound in outer Bangkok. We'd drive there and it's in the middle of all these slums. There were wild chickens running around everywhere. There were open sewers and stuff like that."

== Lyrics and musical style ==
In a September 1997 review of Tu-Plang, Alex Steininger of American site In Music We Trust described Regurgitator as being Australia's answer to the Bloodhound Gang, which is known for its comedy rap rock style. He said, "from offensive lyrics to funny lyrics, it's all covered here". Others have also compared the album to the band Ween, due to its variety of styles. The album has elements of funk metal/rap metal, cocktail music, dance, dub, Indigenous Thai music, industrial music, hip hop, Muzak, pop rock, punk, surf rock, turntablism and spaghetti western music.

=== Song information ===
- "G7 Dick Electro Boogie" contains samples of street sounds in Bangkok. Yeomans later said, "I think this song[']s small claim to fame is attributed to the 'gang-rape a cripple' line nicely taken out of context by a few bored conservative factions floating around at the time."
- Track 4 is a Muzak version of "Couldn't Do It" off the band's first self-titled EP.
- "Blubber Boy" is an up-tempo version of "Blubber Boy" off the band's second EP, New.

== Touring and promotion ==
The band toured with a wide range of bands around the album's release, including thrash metal bands and indie bands. During 1996, it also opened in Australia for the Red Hot Chili Peppers, where bassist Benjamin Ely comically wore a dress. The band followed the Red Hot Chili Peppers shows by touring with Japanese avant-garde band (and Reprise label mates) Boredoms. The band then did its first U.S. tour as guests of God Lives Underwater, followed by a Japan/Australian tour with New York band CIV. Frontman Quan Yeomans refused to tour the United States more than three weeks at a time, which led their American distributor Reprise to quickly lose interest in Tu-Plang following its April 1997 U.S. release. In addition to being released in the U.S., the album was also released in Japan around this time.

== Reception ==
Professional ratings
Review scores
Source	Rating
AllMusic	link

In 1997, The Sydney Morning Herald described the album as, "an album that leapt from rock to rap, from fun to funk, from thrash to surf rock (à la Dick Dale), and it did nothing less than announce the arrival of the most significant band in Australia today. More successfully than any of [its] peers, Regurgitator showed [that it was] committed to pushing the boundaries of contemporary music through [its] marriage of technology and pop." The Age said in 1996 that the album "at times resembles a net surfer's wet dream, skipping from one style to another, sometimes mid-song," and noted Yeomans' sardonic lyrics. it later voted Tu-Plang as one of the greatest albums from the first 50 years of Australian music. In 2018, Australia's ABC referred to Tu-Plang as "the peak of weird in Australian music".

Less flatteringly, AllMusic said the album was "an utterly misbegotten funk-rap-metal fusion [that], much as the band's name implies, offers merely another rehash of the usual genre fare." The song "Pop Porn" was singled out for being, "so overboard in attacking rap misogyny that it reaches levels of offensiveness beyond anything actually in the true hip-hop canon."

== Track listing ==
All music is composed by Regurgitator (Quan Yeomans, Ben Ely and Martin Lee) except Doorselfin (Ben Ely)

No.	Title	Lyrics	Length
1.	"I Sucked a Lot of Cock to Get Where I Am"	Quan Yeomans	2:34
2.	"Kong Foo Sing"	Yeomans	2:57
3.	"G7 Dick Electro Boogie"	Yeomans	3:38
4.	"Couldn't Do It (Happy Shopper Mix)"	Ben Ely	4:01
5.	"Miffy's Simplicity"	Yeomans	1:30
6.	"Social Disaster"	Yeomans	3:00
7.	"Music Is Sport"	Yeomans	3:50
8.	"348 Hz"		3:00
9.	"Mañana"	Ely	4:06
10.	"F.S.O."	Yeomans	1:42
11.	"Pop Porn"	Yeomans	3:10
12.	"Young Bodies Heal Quickly"		2:31
13.	"Blubber Boy (Riding the Wave of Fashion Mix)"	Quan Yeomans	2:18
14.	"Doorselfin"		2:43

== Charts ==
=== Weekly charts ===
Chart (1996/97)	Peak position
Australian Albums (ARIA)	3
New Zealand Albums (RMNZ)	27

=== Year-end charts ===
Chart (1996)	Position
Australian Albums Chart	59

== Certifications ==
Region	Certification	Certified units/sales
Australia (ARIA)	Platinum	70,000^{^}
^{^} Shipments figures based on certification alone.

== Release history ==
Region	Date	Format	Label	Catalogue	Ref.
Australia	6 May 1996	CD	EastWest	0630148952	
Australia	6 May 1996	LP	EastWest	0630148951	
Australia	6 May 1996	Cassette	EastWest	0630148954	
United Kingdom	1996	CD	Coalition Recordings	3984-20301-2	
United States of America	22 April 1997	CD	Reprise Records	946509-2	
Australia	20 September 2013	LP	Valve Records	V130V	
Australia	5 November 2021	Picture disc	Warner Music Australia	5419710771	
