= Girls Like That (play) =

Stage play

Girls Like That is a stage play written by Evan Placey co-commissioned by Birmingham Repertory Theatre, Theatre Royal Plymouth and West Yorkshire Playhouse. The play was first performed by The Young REP as part of the Young Rep Festival at The Old Rep Theatre, Birmingham, on 12 July 2013; the West Yorkshire Playhouse Youth Theatre at the Courtyard Theatre, West Yorkshire Playhouse, on 18 July 2013: and by the Theatre Royal Plymouth Young Company at the Theatre Royal Plymouth, on 14 August 2013.

== Original casts ==
=== Birmingham Repertory Theatre ===
Director: Daniel Tyler

Girls: Kim Atkiss, Dayna Bateman, Anders Bowes, Anushka Chakravarti, Rebekka Ford, Sophie Lines, Jordan Perkins, Anna Piper, Roisin Richardson, Kesia Schofield, Aurora Tanda, Melissa Uppal

Scarlett: Heather Fantham

Boy: Nathan Qeeely-Dennis

=== West Yorkshire Playhouse ===
Director: Gemma Woffinden

Scarlett: Daisy Addison Russell: Hal Lockwood Tyler: Eddie House Jay: Alistair McKenzie Russell's Girlfriend: Emily Anderson-Wallace Girl In Flapper Dress: Hannah Kilcoyne Girl With Aviator Helmet And Goggles: Natasha Brotherdale Smith Girl With Flowers In Her Hair: Zoe Hamilton Girl With Shoulder Pads: Catherine Hawthorn

Male Company: Harri Pitches, Alistair McKenzie, Hal Lockwood, Edward House

Female Company: Emily Anderson-Wallace, Lydia Crossland, Megan Dawson, Jessica Finlay, Mabel Goulden, Zoe Hamilton, Catherine Hawthorn, Bethan Johnson, Hannah Kilcoyne, Laura Marsden, Holly Pennington, Uma Ramachandran, Alice Rayner, Natasha Brotherdale Smith, Lizzie Turner

=== Theatre Royal Plymouth (original cast) ===
Director: Beth Shouler

Girls: Libby Long, Talia Winn, Lorrine Penwarden, Abbie Summers, Beth Edwards, Rosie Stevenson, Alisha Lee, Senga Clarke-Côté, Zoe Kathryn, Amy Wallace, Sinéad Millar

Boys: Simon Hill, Lewis Peek, JJ McColl, Danny Laine

==== Production Team: ====
Director: Beth Shouler

Assistant Director: Liam Salmon

Designer: Fiona Evans

Assistant Designer: Nina Raines

Producer: Jane Pawson

Production Manager: Nick Soper

Lighting Designer: John Purkis

Sound Designer: Holly Harbottle

Theatre Technician: Matt Hoyle

Stage Manager: Brooke Tippett

Deputy Stage Manager: Natasha Whitley

Assistant Stage Manager: Thomas Michaels

== Later productions ==
In May 2014, the Birmingham Repertory Theatre staged a revival of Girls Like That from 1–3 May 2014, with most of the original REP cast and the same director, Daniel Tyler.

The play was performed in London at the Unicorn Theatre in November 2014.

Its Canadian premiere was at the Tarragon Theatre in Toronto in April–May 2018.

== Revival cast ==
Director: Daniel Tyler

- Girls: Dayna Bateman, Anders Bowes, Anushka Chakravarti, Brittney Crawford, Rebekka Ford, Emily France, Sophie Lines, Anna Piper, Roisin Richardson, Aurora Tanda, Simran Kular, Ravneet Sehra
- Scarlett: Heather Fantham
- Boy: Nathan Queeley-Dennis
