= Pauline Pantsdown =

Australian singer

Simon Hunt
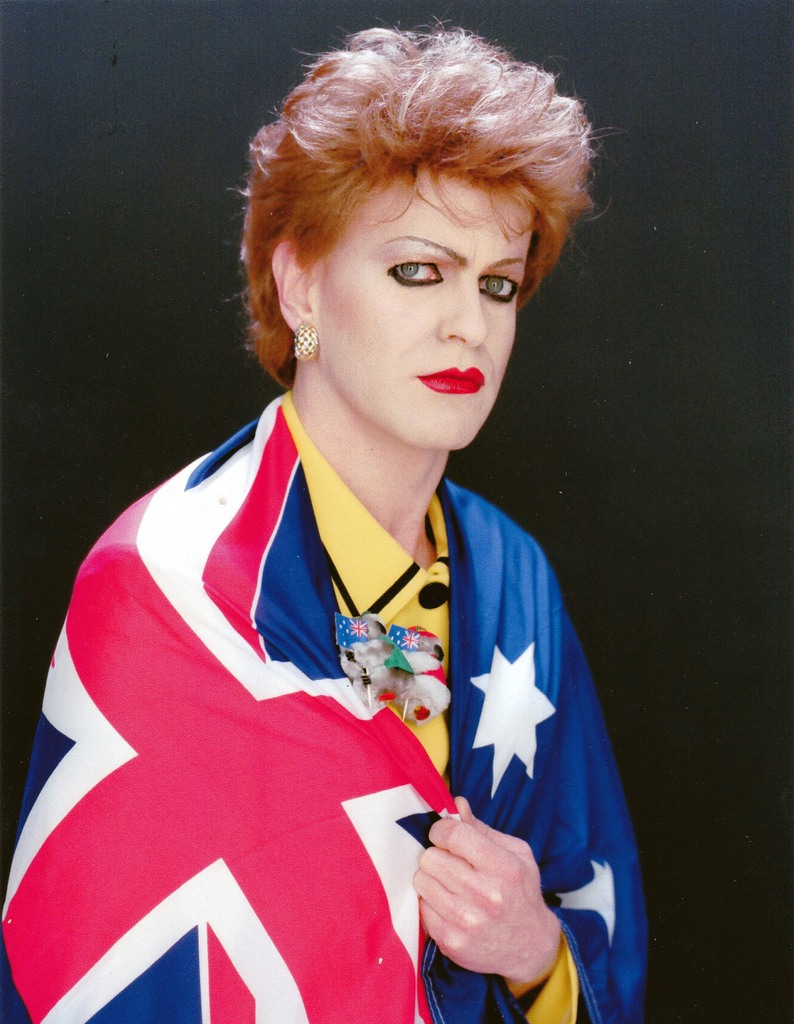
- Hunt as Pauline Pantsdown
- Born: Simon Hunt; 1962 (age 63–64); Sydney, New South Wales, Australia
- Other name: Pauline Pantsdown
- Occupations: Comedian; musician; drag queen; satirist; academic
- Parent: David Hunt

Simon Hunt, sometimes known as Pauline Pantsdown (born 1962), is an Australian comedian, musician and satirist who is notable for his parodies of Pauline Hanson, the leader of the right-wing populist political party One Nation. His birth name is Simon Hunt, but he legally changed his name through Births, Deaths & Marriages so that he would appear on the electoral ballot as "Pauline Pantsdown"; he later changed back to "Simon Hunt". He is the son of the late David Hunt, who was a Chief Judge at Common Law of the Supreme Court of New South Wales.

As Pantsdown, he is a drag queen whose taste in fashion parodies Hanson's, and is best known for the songs "Backdoor Man" and "I Don't Like It". The song "Backdoor Man" was a huge hit on the youth radio network Triple J after its release in 1997, being played almost hourly due to a massive number of requests, making it into the 1997 Hottest 100 list at number 5. However, less than a week after its release, Hanson obtained a court injunction against the song, claiming it was defamatory. In September 2004, after Hanson launched a campaign for the Australian Senate, the ABC was reported to be planning a challenge to the injunction. However, after public criticism from Hanson, the ABC backed down.

== Early life and activism ==
Born in Sydney, Hunt began playing in bands when he was 12 years old.

Hunt became influenced by arts-activism work around the world as a young adult, particularly the group ACT UP.

Prior to parodying Hanson, Hunt had been active in gay activism. Hunt had successfully lobbied the Office of Film and Literature Classification to remove homosexuality from its list of "adult themes", and in 1989 he produced a parody track using samples of Fred Nile's voice which he played during an anti-gay protest organised by Nile to drown out his voice. As a gay man, Hunt reflected that homosexuality was not legalised in New South Wales until he was 22; until that point, the prison sentence for consensual homosexual sex was longer than it was for heterosexual rape.

In 1991, Hunt created the short film Resonance with Stephen Cummins. The film was inspired by the gay bashing of Cummins in Sydney and features dancers set to Hunt's music.

In 1999, Hunt helped in the addition of samples to the Australian Chamber Orchestra's performance of Berlin mass by Arvo Pärt and Carlo by Brett Dean.

As of 2016, Hunt is a head lecturer at the University of New South Wales.

== Homebake appearance ==
The resulting controversy resulted in Pauline Pantsdown making an appearance at the 1998 Homebake live music festival, complete with apparently gay half-naked Asian dancers. He was booed and pelted with objects and later claimed "Homophobia is alive and well in Sydney".

== Songs ==
- "Backdoor Man" was originally conceived of as a lip-sync performance by Hunt for performance at a dance party. Another organiser of the party gave a recording of the song to the ABC to promote the dance party, and as a result, "Backdoor Man" became the most-requested song on Triple J over a period of 11 days. "Backdoor Man" consists of a series of samples of Hanson's speeches stuck together to form sentences such as "I'm a backdoor man. I'm homosexual. I'm very proud of it", and "I'm a backdoor man for the Ku Klux Klan with very horrendous plans. I'm a very caring potato", parodying Hanson's conservative politics. Hanson vehemently condemned the track, claiming that the song portrayed her as a prostitute and a transsexual.

Sample of "Backdoor Man"
A 23-second sample of Pauline Pantsdown's "Backdoor Man"

- After the injunction over "Backdoor Man", Pantsdown released the follow-up single "I Don't Like It" in response. The title lyric, to Hunt, "epitomised the whinging, that she would complain about things, and never have solutions". Hunt designed the song so that it would have politics for the adults, and that it would be catchy for kids to sing along. The song, like its predecessor, used segments of Hanson's voice to parody her, the lyrics again ridiculous and absurd; "my shopping trolley: murdered." Yet, "I Don't Like It" does not make false claims about Hanson, rather making fun of her conservative politics "Why can't my blood be coloured white? I should talk to some medical doctors; coloured blood is just not right". The music video depicts Pauline injuring her finger and refusing a blood transfusion from a donor who is not white, before dying and arriving in heaven which is full of gay Asian angels. Once again the song was a hit on Triple J and peaked in the ARIA Charts at number 10 during the 1998 federal election campaign. "I Don't Like It" was nominated for Best Comedy Release at the 1999 ARIA Awards.
- In 2004, on the Rock Against Howard compilation, Hunt released the song "I'm Sorry" under the pseudonym Little Johnny, which had appeared as a download on his website earlier in 2000 with a video. This song used the same techniques to parody John Howard's refusal to apologise to the Aboriginal people of Australia over the Stolen Generations, while this time making fun of his physical appearance; "I'm sorry about my head and my nose". The song ends with the voice of Howard apologising, before stating "it's very simple".

== Senate run ==
Hunt changed his name by deed poll so that he would appear on the electoral ballot for the 1998 senate elections as "Pauline Pantsdown"; he later changed back to "Simon Hunt". On the night of the federal election, Pantsdown performed at the Mardi Gras Sleaze Ball, and a Pauline Hanson Mardi Gras float was exploded.

== 2010s ==
Pantsdown performed a remixed version of "I Don't Like It" at the 2011 Sydney Gay & Lesbian Mardi Gras Party during Bob Downe's 'Retro-Gras' DJ set just days before Hanson announced her candidacy in the 2011 NSW state election. Pantsdown also performed a remixed version of "I Don't Like It" on Channel Seven's The Morning Show on 22 May 2012. Nearing the end of the performance, Hunt undid a rainbow-coloured button-up shirt and revealed a T-shirt with the slogan "ABBOTT is INSIDE me" written on it, with a caricature of Tony Abbott's head beneath it. In an interview following his performance, he claimed that he was partly inspired by the "hurt and pain" that, in particular, the communities Hanson targeted at the time felt, and "wanted to give them an opportunity to laugh back". Kylie Gillies also noted that Hunt now lectures at a university (Media Arts, at the University of New South Wales College of Fine Arts, or COFA).

Hunt also campaigned against opera singer Tamar Iveri, who was released from a performance of Othello after making homophobic comments on social media. After Hanson won a place in the senate in 2016, Hunt considered a return as Pantsdown. In the same year, in a televised clip, Hanson referred to Hunt as "What a joke...he was an absolute idiot ratbag".

Hunt maintains a Facebook page as Pauline Pantsdown. In 2016, he was campaigning against the same-sex marriage plebiscite and the Australian Christian Lobby.

Hunt explained, "I think that stopping the plebiscite has been incredibly important in, at the very least, shutting down funding for those sorts of campaigns. It would have been a really dark stain on our history if we had funded a ‘no’ campaign for this issue, because it wouldn’t have been about marriage equality at all."

Nevertheless, the plebiscite went ahead, and the legality of same-sex marriage was ratified with a 61.6% vote in the affirmative.

During the Australian Marriage Law Postal Survey, Pantsdown ran a parody Twitter account spoofing the Coalition for Marriage.

== Awards and nominations ==
=== ARIA Music Awards ===
The ARIA Music Awards are a set of annual ceremonies presented by Australian Recording Industry Association (ARIA), which recognise excellence, innovation, and achievement across all genres of the music of Australia. They commenced in 1987.

Year	Nominee / work	Award	Result
1999	"I Don't Like It"	Best Independent Release	Nominated
1999	"I Don't Like It"	Best Comedy Release	Nominated
