= Respect All Lifeforms =

2020 album by Custard

Studio album by Custard
- Released: 22 May 2020
- Recorded: 2019–2020
- Studio: Poonshead Studio, East Fremantle; Das Kong Studios; Horses of Australia Studio
- Genre: Alternative rock, pop rock, indie rock
- Label: ABC Music
- Producer: Custard

Custard chronology
| The Common Touch (2017) | Respect All Lifeforms (2020) | Suburban Curtains (2024) |

Respect All Lifeforms is the eighth studio album by Australian alternative rock band Custard, released on 22 May 2020 by ABC Music.

The album was preceded by the release of the single "Funky Again", which was accompanied by a video directed by longtime collaborator Andrew Lancaster.

== Background ==
The album's basic tracking was conducted at Poonshead Studio in Fremantle, Western Australia in one day. The studio was recommended to the band by Perth band Turnstyle, who were playing a festival with Custard on the same weekend. Drummer Glenn Thompson mixed the album at Horses of Australia Studio Marrickville.

The album cover features the studio's Roland SH-3A synthesizer played by Cowboy John, a drifter who frequented the studio. He can also be heard on recordings by the band Pond.

== Tracklist ==
| No. | Title | Length |
|---|---|---|
| 1. | "Couple's Fight" | 3:34 |
| 2. | "Funky Again" | 2:42 |
| 3. | "Harlequin Records" | 2:55 |
| 4. | "A Cat Called No" | 3:46 |
| 5. | "Wishing" | 1:46 |
| 6. | "Take the Skinheads Bowling" | 3:10 |
| 7. | "The Min Min Lights" | 3:40 |
| 8. | "Talkative Town" | 3:31 |
| 9. | "Like People" | 2:50 |
| 10. | "Watcha Waiting For" | 3:07 |
| 11. | "Come Tuesday" | 3:05 |

== Charts ==
Chart performance for Respect All Lifeforms
| Chart (2020) | Peak position |
|---|---|
| Australian Albums (ARIA) | 33 |
