= Triple J's Hottest 100 of 1998 =

Most popular songs of the year in Australia

1998 Triple J Hottest 100
- Album artwork for the CD compilation

Countdown details
- Date of countdown: 26 January 1999

Countdown highlights
- Winning song: The Offspring "Pretty Fly (For a White Guy)"
- Most entries: Quan Yeomans (6)

Chronology
| ← Previous; 1998 All Time | Next → 1999 |

The 1998 Triple J Hottest 100, announced on 26 January 1999, was the sixth such countdown of the most popular songs of the year, according to listeners of the Australian radio station Triple J. As in previous years, a CD featuring 36 of the songs was released. In August 1998 a Hottest 100 of All Time was conducted separate to normal countdown.

In February 2019, Triple J's sister station Double J conducted a "re-vote" of the 1998 top 10.

== Full list ==
| Note: Australian artists |

| # | Song | Artist | Country of origin |
|---|---|---|---|
| 1 | Pretty Fly (For a White Guy) | The Offspring | United States |
| 2 | Cigarettes Will Kill You | Ben Lee | Australia |
| 3 | Girls Like That (Don't Go For Guys Like Us) | Custard | Australia |
| 4 | Celebrity Skin | Hole | United States |
| 5 | Got the Life | Korn | United States |
| 6 | ! (The Song Formerly Known As) | Regurgitator | Australia |
| 7 | Harpoon | Jebediah | Australia |
| 8 | The Day You Come | Powderfinger | Australia |
| 9 | Heavy Heart | You Am I | Australia |
| 10 | Save the Day | The Living End | Australia |
| 11 | Sweetest Thing | U2 | Ireland |
| 12 | Brick | Ben Folds Five | United States |
| 13 | Doctor Worm | They Might Be Giants | United States |
| 14 | Josie | Blink-182 | United States |
| 15 | Second Solution | The Living End | Australia |
| 16 | Addicted to Bass | Josh Abrahams and Amiel Daemion | Australia |
| 17 | Tainted Love | The Living End | Australia |
| 18 | Just Ace | Grinspoon | Australia |
| 19 | Bubblegoose | Wyclef Jean featuring Melky Sedeck | United States |
| 20 | Simultaneous | Chef | United States |
| 21 | Sex and Candy | Marcy Playground | United States |
| 22 | Black Friday | Grinspoon | Australia |
| 23 | Teardrop | Massive Attack | United Kingdom |
| 24 | Music Is Crap | Custard | Australia |
| 25 | Intergalactic | Beastie Boys | United States |
| 26 | Polyester Girl | Regurgitator | Australia |
| 27 | I Like Your Old Remix Better Than Your New Remix | Regurgitator | Australia |
| 28 | Don't You Know Who I Am? | Happyland | Australia |
| 29 | Everybody Here Wants You | Jeff Buckley | United States |
| 30 | Never There | Cake | United States |
| 31 | Throw Your Arms Around Me | Paul McDermott | Australia |
| 32 | Black Bugs | Regurgitator | Australia |
| 33 | Sweater | Eskimo Joe | Australia |
| 34 | One Week | Barenaked Ladies | Canada |
| 35 | Flagpole Sitta | Harvey Danger | United States |
| 36 | Whatareya? | TISM | Australia |
| 37 | Buy Now Pay Later (Charlie No. 2) | The Whitlams | Australia |
| 38 | The Impression That I Get | The Mighty Mighty Bosstones | United States |
| 39 | Somebody Kill Me | Adam Sandler | United States |
| 40 | Song for the Dumped | Ben Folds Five | United States |
| 41 | Pure Morning | Placebo | United Kingdom |
| 42 | Teflon | Jebediah | Australia |
| 43 | Melbourne | The Whitlams | Australia |
| 44 | The Dope Show | Marilyn Manson | United States |
| 45 | Ava Adore | The Smashing Pumpkins | United States |
| 46 | Don't Wanna Be Left Out | Powderfinger | Australia |
| 47 | Do the Evolution | Pearl Jam | United States |
| 48 | Road Rage | Catatonia | United Kingdom |
| 49 | Malibu | Hole | United States |
| 50 | It's Like That | Run–D.M.C. vs. Jason Nevins | United States |
| 51 | Given to Fly | Pearl Jam | United States |
| 52 | The Grouch | Green Day | United States |
| 53 | Father of Mine | Everclear | United States |
| 54 | Mum Changed the Locks | Frenzal Rhomb | Australia |
| 55 | No Surprises | Radiohead | United Kingdom |
| 56 | Charlie No. 3 | The Whitlams | Australia |
| 57 | I Think I'm Paranoid | Garbage | United States |
| 58 | I Don't Like It | Pauline Pantsdown | Australia |
| 59 | History Repeating | Propellerheads featuring Shirley Bassey | United Kingdom |
| 60 | Untouchable Face | Ani DiFranco | United States |
| 61 | Cry | The Mavis's | Australia |
| 62 | Gone Away | The Offspring | United States |
| 63 | The Rockafeller Skank | Fatboy Slim | United Kingdom |
| 64 | Come On Spring | Antenna | Australia |
| 65 | Rumble | You Am I | Australia |
| 66 | No Shelter | Rage Against the Machine | United States |
| 67 | The Unforgiven II | Metallica | United States |
| 68 | Every Day Should Be a Holiday | The Dandy Warhols | United States |
| 69 | Cinnamon Lip | Pollyanna | Australia |
| 70 | If You Tolerate This Your Children Will Be Next | Manic Street Preachers | United Kingdom |
| 71 | Hello! | Happyland | Australia |
| 72 | Mr. Charisma | Frenzal Rhomb | Australia |
| 73 | Music Sounds Better with You | Stardust | France |
| 74 | My Hero | Foo Fighters | United States |
| 75 | Dragula | Rob Zombie | United States |
| 76 | Saint Joe on the School Bus | Marcy Playground | United States |
| 77 | Fuel | Metallica | United States |
| 78 | Shimmer | Fuel | United States |
| 79 | Don't Go Away | Grinspoon | Australia |
| 80 | Bad Old Man | Babybird | United Kingdom |
| 81 | Drinking in L.A. | Bran Van 3000 | Canada |
| 82 | El President | Drugstore | United Kingdom |
| 83 | Now and Then | The Superjesus | Australia |
| 84 | Good Riddance (Time of Your Life) | Green Day | United States |
| 85 | Harpoon | Something for Kate | Australia |
| 86 | Mama's Trippin' | Ben Harper | United States |
| 87 | Push It | Garbage | United States |
| 88 | Wishlist | Pearl Jam | United States |
| 89 | Special | Garbage | United States |
| 90 | No Substitute | Chef | United States |
| 91 | Benedict | Jebediah | Australia |
| 92 | The Ballad of Tom Jones | Space featuring Cerys Matthews | United Kingdom |
| 93 | Untitled | Silverchair | Australia |
| 94 | Perfect | The Smashing Pumpkins | United States |
| 95 | Tropicalia | Beck | United States |
| 96 | Redneck Wonderland | Midnight Oil | Australia |
| 97 | Black Umbrella | Even | Australia |
| 98 | Baker Street | Foo Fighters | United States |
| 99 | Saturation | The Superjesus | Australia |
| 100 | Sich Offnen | Not from There | Australia |

42 of the 100 songs were by Australian artists (marked with a green background).

=== 2019 Revote ===
In February 2019, Triple J's sister station Double J conducted a "re-vote" of the 1998 top 10. Only songs that charted in the original 1998 list were eligible. 66,000 votes were cast.

| # | Song | Artist | Country of origin | Previous position |
|---|---|---|---|---|
| 1 | Pretty Fly (For a White Guy) | The Offspring | United States | 1 |
| 2 | ! (The Song Formerly Known As) | Regurgitator | Australia | 6 |
| 3 | Dragula | Rob Zombie | United States | 75 |
| 4 | Whatareya? | TISM | Australia | 36 |
| 5 | I Think I'm Paranoid | Garbage | United States | 57 |
| 6 | The Unforgiven II | Metallica | United States | 67 |
| 7 | Intergalactic | Beastie Boys | United States | 25 |
| 8 | Addicted to Bass | Josh Abrahams and Amiel Daemion | Australia | 16 |
| 9 | No Shelter | Rage Against the Machine | United States | 66 |
| 10 | The Dope Show | Marilyn Manson | United States | 44 |

== Statistics ==
=== Artists with multiple entries ===
| # | Artist | Tracks |
|---|---|---|
| 6 | Quan Yeomans (Note: Four times with Regurgitator (6, 26, 27, 32), twice with Happyland (28, 71)) | 6, 26, 27, 28, 32, 71 |
| 4 | Regurgitator | 6, 26, 27, 32 |
| 3 | Jebediah | 7, 42, 91 |
| 3 | The Living End | 10, 15, 17 |
| 3 | Grinspoon | 18, 22, 79 |
| 3 | The Whitlams | 37, 43, 56 |
| 3 | Pearl Jam | 47, 51, 88 |
| 3 | Garbage | 57, 87, 89 |
| 2 | The Offspring | 1, 62 |
| 2 | Custard | 3, 24 |
| 2 | Hole | 4, 49 |
| 2 | Powderfinger | 8, 46 |
| 2 | You Am I | 9, 65 |
| 2 | Ben Folds Five | 12, 40 |
| 2 | Chef | 20, 90 |
| 2 | Marcy Playground | 21, 76 |
| 2 | Happyland | 28, 71 |
| 2 | The Smashing Pumpkins | 45, 94 |
| 2 | Green Day | 52, 84 |
| 2 | Frenzal Rhomb | 54, 72 |
| 2 | Metallica | 67, 77 |
| 2 | Foo Fighters | 74, 98 |
| 2 | The Superjesus | 83, 99 |

=== Countries Represented ===
| Nation | Total |
|---|---|
| United States | 44 |
| Australia | 42 |
| United Kingdom | 10 |
| Canada | 2 |
| Ireland | 1 |
| France | 1 |

== Top 10 Albums of 1998 ==
| # | Artist | Album | Country of origin | Tracks in the Hottest 100 |
|---|---|---|---|---|
| 1 | The Living End | The Living End | Australia | 10, 15, (15 in 1997) (41, 48 in 1999) |
| 2 | Powderfinger | Internationalist | Australia | 8, 46, (25, 68, 100 in 1999) |
| 3 | Korn | Follow the Leader | United States | 5, (16 in 1999) |
| 4 | Pearl Jam | Yield | United States | 47, 51, 88 |
| 5 | The Smashing Pumpkins | Adore | United States | 45, 94 |
| 6 | The Superjesus | Sumo | Australia | 83, 99, (14 in 1997) |
| 7 | Massive Attack | Mezzanine | United Kingdom | 23 |
| 8 | Jeff Buckley | Sketches for My Sweetheart the Drunk | United States | 29 |
| 9 | Garbage | Version 2.0 | United States | 57, 87, 89, (12 in 1999) |
| 10 | You Am I | #4 Record | Australia | 9, 65 |

== CD release ==
Disc 1
1. Hole – "Celebrity Skin" (2:42)
2. Josh Abrahams and Amiel Daemion – "Addicted to Bass" (3:54)
3. Cake – "Never There" (2:44)
4. Ben Lee – "Cigarettes Will Kill You" (3:50)
5. Korn – "Got the Life" (D.O.S.E Woollyback Remix) (5:27)
6. Custard – "Girls Like That (Don't Go For Guys Like Us)" (3:17)
7. Powderfinger – "The Day You Come" (4:01)
8. Blink-182 – "Josie (Everything's Gonna Be Fine)" (3:23)
9. Jebediah – "Harpoon" (4:28)
10. You Am I – "Heavy Heart" (3:10)
11. They Might Be Giants – "Doctor Worm" (3:02)
12. U2 – "Sweetest Thing" (3:00)
13. Green Day – "The Grouch" (2:11)
14. Ben Folds Five – "Brick" (4:42)
15. The Living End – "Second Solution" (3:00)
16. Marcy Playground – "Sex and Candy" (2:52)
17. Grinspoon – "Black Friday" (2:29)
18. Pauline Pantsdown – "I Don't Like It" (3:17)
Disc 2
1. Beastie Boys – "Intergalactic" (3:30)
2. Not from There – "Sich Offnen" (3:50)
3. Happyland – "Don't You Know Who I Am" (2:20)
4. Eskimo Joe – "Sweater" (2:16)
5. Barenaked Ladies – "One Week" (2:52)
6. The Whitlams – "Buy Now Pay Later (Charlie No. 2)" (3:42)
7. The Mighty Mighty Bosstones – "The Impression That I Get" (3:14)
8. Placebo – "Pure Morning" (4:14)
9. Everclear – "Father of Mine" (3:52)
10. Jeff Buckley – "Everybody Here Wants You" (4:46)
11. Garbage – "I Think I'm Paranoid" (3:40)
12. Regurgitator – "! (The Song Formerly Known As)" (3:25)
13. Radiohead – "No Surprises" (3:48)
14. Fatboy Slim – "The Rockafeller Skank" (6:53)
15. The Dandy Warhols – "Every Day Should Be a Holiday" (4:03)
16. Bran Van 3000 – "Drinking in L.A." (3:34)
17. The Mavis's – "Cry" (4:09)
18. Massive Attack – "Teardrop" (5:29)

This was the last volume to be released on cassette.

A later release omits "Never There", "Got the Life", "Sweetest Thing", "Brick", "Don't You Know Who I Am", and "Everybody Here Wants You", while including "If You Tolerate This Your Children Will Be Next" by Manic Street Preachers, "Untouchable Face" by Ani DiFranco, and Something for Kate's cover of "Harpoon".

=== Certifications ===
| Region | Certification | Certified units/sales |
|---|---|---|
| Australia (ARIA) | 3× Platinum | 210,000^{^} |
^{^} Shipments figures based on certification alone.

== See also ==
- 1998 in music
