= Suburban Curtains =

2024 album by Custard

Studio album by Custard
- Released: 11 October 2024
- Recorded: April 2022, November 2023 and February 2024
- Studio: Frying Pan Studio, Hobart; Poons Head, Fremantle
- Genre: Alternative rock, pop rock, indie rock
- Label: ABC Music
- Producer: Custard

Custard chronology
Respect All Lifeforms (2020)	Suburban Curtains (2024)

Singles from Suburban Curtains
- 1. "Molecules Colliding" Released: 15 August 2024; 2. "Someday (feat. Serena Ryder)" Released: 26 September 2024; 3. "Heart Attacks" Released: 1 November 2024

Suburban Curtains is the ninth studio album by Australian alternative rock band Custard. It was released on 11 October 2024.

The singles "Molecules Colliding" and "Someday" featuring Serena Ryder preceded the album's release.

== Tracklist ==
No.	Title	Length
1.	"Diplomat of Love"	3:20
2.	"Black Rinse"	2:28
3.	"Someday"	2:34
4.	"I Love You FNQ"	1:39
5.	"Coat of Paint"	2:57
6.	"Pushing All the Buttons"	3:22
7.	"Getting Over You"	3:07
8.	"Never Loved Melbourne"	2:33
9.	"Heart Attacks"	3:28
10.	"Help Someone"	3:06
11.	"Some People Are Missing"	3:02
12.	"Fifty Plus"	1:43
13.	"Vegetarian Squeeze"	5:02
14.	"Love Tax"	3:01
15.	"Cold Heart (Take Me Down to Rockdale Plaza)"	3:48
16.	"Sometimes Angels"	2:43
17.	"Molecules Colliding"	3:35
18.	"Dear Weddos"	0:51
19.	"Without You"	3:11
20.	"No Pay No Delicious"	4:00
21.	"The Leisurely Everly"	3:36
