= Girls Like That (Don't Go for Guys Like Us) =

Single by Custard

from the album Loverama
- Released: 5 October 1998
- Length: 3:18
- Label: rooArt
- Songwriters: David McCormack, Dylan McCormack, Trevor J. Ludlow
- Producer: Magoo

Custard singles chronology
"Music Is Crap" (1998)	"Girls Like That (Don't Go for Guys Like Us)" (1998)	"Hit Song" (1999)

"Girls Like That (Don't Go for Guys Like Us)" is the first single from Loverama, the fifth album by Custard. It reached #52 on the Australian ARIA singles chart, and spent 24 weeks in the top 100. The song was placed #3 in the 1998 Hottest 100.

The Andrew Lancaster and David McCormack directed music video won the ARIA Award for Best Video at the ARIA Music Awards of 1999.

McCormack later said, "We were going around in circles. 'Girls Like That' is as far as you can take the ironic love song; you just can't go any further than that."

== Track listing ==
No.	Title	Writer(s)	Length
1.	"Girls Like That (Don't Go for Guys Like Us)"	David McCormack, Dylan McCormack & Trevor J. Ludlow	3:18
2.	"Caboolture Speed Lab"	David McCormack & Dylan McCormack	2:13
3.	"I'll Never Fall in Love Again"	Burt Bacharach & Hal David	4:02

== Charts ==
Chart (1998–99)	Peak position
Australia (ARIA)	52
