= Emma Jane =

Australian author and academic

Emma A. Jane (born 1969), previously known as Emma Tom, is an Australian professor, author, and journalist.

She once wrote a weekly column for The Australian and made regular appearances on Australian television and radio. She received an Edna Ryan Award in 2001 for humour. Jane has written ten books including Deadset, her debut novel which won the 1998 Commonwealth Writers' Prize for Best First Book for South East Asia and the South Pacific.

Jane completed a PhD at the University of New South Wales's Journalism and Media Research Centre (JMRC), where she then became an associate professor. Her areas of research include communication, media studies, culture, and gender and sexuality.

She has sung and played bass in Australian rock bands The Titanics (with her then-husband David McCormack) and 16dd.

== Bibliography ==
- Deadset, Vintage, 1997, ISBN 9780091834418
- Babewatch, Hodder Headline, 1998, ISBN 9780733609541
- Evidence, HarperCollins Publishers Australia, 2002, ISBN 9780732273965
- Something about Mary: From Girl about Town to Crown Princess, Pluto Press, 2005, ISBN 9781864032734
- Bali: paradise lost?, Pluto Press Australia, 2006, ISBN 9781864033533
- Attack of the Fifty-Foot Hormones: Your One-Stop Survival Guide to Staying Sane During Pregnancy, HarperCollins Publishers Australia, 2009, ISBN 9780732286729
- Modern Conspiracy – The Importance of Being Paranoid, coauthored with Chris Fleming, Bloomsbury Publishing, 2014. ISBN 9781623565893
- Cultural Studies: Theory and Practice, coauthored with Chris Barker, SAGE, 2016. ISBN 9781473919457
- Cybercrime and its Victims, coauthored with Elena Martellozzo, Routledge, 2017. ISBN 9780367226701
- Misogyny Online: A Short (and Brutish) History, SAGE, 2017. ISBN 9781473916005
