= Regurgitator discography =

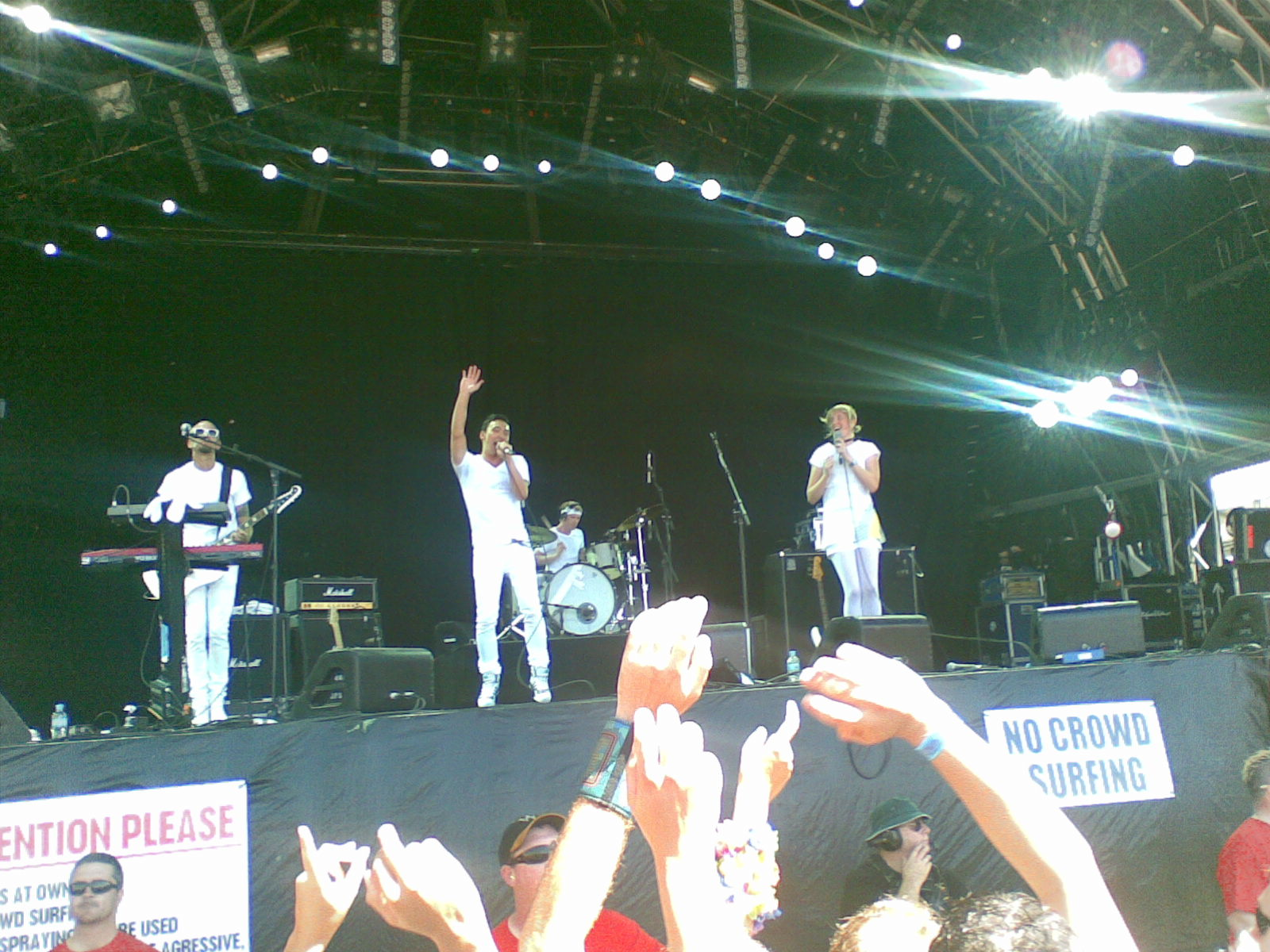
- Regurgitator performing in 2008
- Studio albums: 11
- EPs: 6
- Live albums: 4
- Compilation albums: 3

The discography of Regurgitator, an Australian alternative rock band, consists of 11 studio albums, 3 compilation albums, 4 live albums and 6 extended plays.

Regurgitator were formed in late 1993 by core members Quan Yeomans (vocals, guitar, electronics) and Ben Ely (vocals, bass, electronics).

== Studio albums ==
Title	Album details	Peak chart positions		Certifications
Title	Album details	AUS	NZ	Certifications
Tu-Plang	Released: 6 May 1996; Label: East West/ WEA Australia 0630-14895; US: Reprise/Warner Bros. 46509	3	27	ARIA: Platinum
Unit	Released: 7 November 1997; Label: East West/WEA Australia 3984-21276	4	7	ARIA: 3× Platinum
...art	Released: 23 August 1999; Label: East West/WEA Australia 3984-29016	2	12	ARIA: Gold
Eduardo and Rodriguez Wage War on T-Wrecks	Released: 16 July 2001; Label: East West/WEA Australia 8573-87981	7	—	
Mish Mash!	Released: 15 November 2004; Label: Valve (V63)	52	—	
Love and Paranoia	Released: 15 September 2007; Label: Valve (V92)	74	—	
Super Happy Fun Times Friends	Released: 5 August 2011; Label: Valve (V123)	91	—	
Dirty Pop Fantasy	Released: 6 September 2013; Label: Valve (V129)	123	—	
Headroxx	Released: 1 August 2018; Label: Valve (V155)	—	—	
The Really Really Really Really Boring Album (as Regurgitator's Pogogo Show)	Released: 1 March 2019; Label: Valve (V156)	—	—	
Invader	Released: 26 April 2024; Label: Valve (V175), ABC Music	— (Note: Invader did not enter the Australian Albums (ARIA) top 100 but peaked at number 50 on the Australian Physical Albums)	—	

== Live albums ==
Title	Album details
Nothing Less than Cheap Imitations	Released: 4 September 2015; Label: Valve (V142)
Live at Wo'Hol, Osaka 24 Sept 1996	Released: 2019; Label: Self-released
Live at Gaelic Club, Sydney 26 Aug 2005	Released: 27 August 2021; Label: Self-released
Unit20 (Live 2017 Gold Coast)	Released: 24 May 2023; Label: Self-released

== Compilation albums ==
Title	Album details	Peak chart positions
Title	Album details	AUS
Generic City Pileup	Released: January 2001 (only in Japan); Label: East West/WEA Japan 0927-49168	—N/a
Jingles: The Best Of	Released: October 2002; Label: East West/WEA Australia 0927-49168	117
Quarter Pounder: 25 Years of Being Consumed	Released: 4 October 2019; Label: WEA Australia 5419-70562-0	—

== Video albums ==
Title	Details	Certification
Regurgitated	Released: 22 November 1996; Label: Warner Vision Australia	ARIA: Gold
Live in Brisbane (Festival Hall 1998)	Released: 1999; Label: Warner Vision Australia	
Jingles (Infomercials)	Released: 2002; Label: Warner Vision Australia	
Nein, Nein, Nein... The Slumber of the Beast Tour 02/03 – The DVD	Released: 2003; Label: Valve	
Band in a Bubble: The DVD	Released: 12 January 2008; Label: Valve	
Unit20	Released: 18 October 2019; Label: Valve	

== EPs ==
Title	EP details	Peak chart positions
Title	EP details	AUS
Regurgitator	Released: 6 February 1995; Label: Warner Bros. (4509991422)	45
New	Released: August 1995; Label: East West/WEA Australia (0630-11763); US: Reprise/Warner Bros. (46437)	30
Crush the Losers	Released: September 2000; Label: WEA Australia (8573-83935)	64
Generic City (Regurgitator meets Pnau, Friendly & Sugiurumn)	Released: September 2000; Label: WEA Australia (8573-84406-0); Limited-edition vinyl	—
#?*! (aka Pillowhead)	Released: August 2005; Label: Valve (V68)	122
Distractions	Released: September 2010; Label: Valve (V120)	—

== Singles ==
Year	Title	Peak chart positions			Certifications	Album
Year	Title	AUS	NZ	UK	Certifications	Album
1994	"Couldn't Do It"	(Note: These singles were released as radio promo singles and thus were ineligible to chart.)	—	—		Regurgitator EP
1995	"Like It Like That"	(Note: These singles were released as radio promo singles and thus were ineligible to chart.)	—	—		Regurgitator EP
1995	"Track 1"	(Note: These singles were released as radio promo singles and thus were ineligible to chart.)	—	—		New EP
1995	"Blubber Boy"	(Note: These singles were released as radio promo singles and thus were ineligible to chart.)	—	—		New EP
1996	"F.S.O."	51	—	—		Tu-Plang
1996	"Kong Foo Sing"	33	—	—		Tu-Plang
1996	"Miffy's Simplicity"	54	—	—		Tu-Plang
1996	"I Sucked a Lot of Cock to Get Where I Am"	104	—	—		Tu-Plang
1997	"Everyday Formula"	41	—	—		Unit
1997	"Black Bugs"	32	—	88		Unit
1998	"Polyester Girl"	14	16	132	ARIA: Gold	Unit
1998	"! (The Song Formerly Known As)"	28	—	—		Unit
1999	"Happiness (Rotting My Brain)"	44	16	—		...art
1999	"I Wanna Be a Nudist"	75	—	—		...art
2000	"Freshmint!"	44	—	—		...art
2000	"Crush the Losers"	(Note: "Crush the Losers" was released as a radio single in Australia, so its sales went towards the EP.)	—	—		Crush the Losers
2000	"Are You Being Served"	—	—	—		...art
2001	"Fat Cop"	34	—	—		Eduardo and Rodriguez Wage War on T-Wrecks
2001	"Super Straight"	55	—	—		Eduardo and Rodriguez Wage War on T-Wrecks
2002	"Hullabaloo"	130	—	—		Eduardo and Rodriguez Wage War on T-Wrecks
2004	"Bong in My Eye"	178	—	—		Non-album single
2004	"The Drop"	69	—	—		Mish Mash!
2004	"My Friend Robot"	—	—	—		Mish Mash!
2005	"My Ego"	—	—	—		Mish Mash!
2005	"Pretty Girls Swear"	(Note: "Pretty Girls Swear" was released as a radio single in Australia, meaning it was ineligible to chart.)	—	—		#?*! EP
2007	"Blood and Spunk"	—	—	—		Love and Paranoia
2008	"Romance of the Damned"	—	—	—		Love and Paranoia
2010	"Making No Sense"	—	—	—		Distractions
2010	"Nrob Bmud"	—	—	—		Non-album single
2011	"One Day"	—	—	—		Super Happy Fun Times Friends
2011	"No Show"	—	—	—		Super Happy Fun Times Friends
2012	"Be Still My Noisy Mind"	—	—	—		Super Happy Fun Times Friends
2012	"All Fake Everything"	—	—	—		Super Happy Fun Times Friends
2013	"Dirty Pop Fantasy"	—	—	—		Dirty Pop Fantasy
2013	"Made to Break"	—	—	—		Dirty Pop Fantasy
2013	"Sine Wave"	—	—	—		Dirty Pop Fantasy
2018	"Don't Stress"/"Light Me On Fire"	—	—	—		Headroxx
2018	"Party Looks"	—	—	—		Headroxx
2018	"I Get the Internet"	—	—	—		Headroxx
2019	"Not Alone"	—	—	—		Headroxx
2019	"No Point"	—	—	—		Headroxx
2019	"The Pogogo Show Theme" (as Regurgitator's Pogogo Show)	—	—	—		The Really Really Really Really Boring Album
2019	"The Box" (as Regurgitator's Pogogo Show)	—	—	—		The Really Really Really Really Boring Album
2019	"Animals" (as Regurgitator's Pogogo Show)	—	—	—		Non-album single
2019	"Best Friends Forever" (as Regurgitator's Pogogo Show)	—	—	—		The Really, Really, Really, Really Boring Album
2024	"This Is Not a Pop Song" (featuring Peaches)	—	—	—		Invader
2024	"Cocaine Runaway"	—	—	—		Invader
2024	"Epic"	—	—	—		Invader
2024	"Pest"	—	—	—		Invader
2024	"Tsunami"	—	—	—		Invader
2024	"Social Disaster" (featuring Dem Mob) / "Dirty Old Men" (featuring JK-47)	—	—	—		Non-album single
