= Pillowhead =

2005 EP by Regurgitator

Pillowhead (#*?!)

EP by Regurgitator
- Released: August 2005
- Recorded: 31 August – 21 September 2004
- Venues: in a bubble at Federation Square, Melbourne
- Label: Valve
- Producer: Magoo

Regurgitator chronology
Mish Mash! (2004)	Pillowhead (#*?!) (2005)	Love and Paranoia (2007)

Singles from Pillowhead (#*?!)
- 1. "Pretty Girls Swear" Released: August 2005

Pillowhead, also known as #*?!, is an extended play by Australian rock band Regurgitator released in August 2005. The EP was supported by a Regurgitator Lives! tour.

== Background and release ==
In August 2004, Regurgitator relocated to Federation Square, Melbourne, as part of Foxtel's Australian music channel Channel V's Band in a Bubble program, in which the band entered a small glass recording studio while the public could watch the band work, or tune into a 24-hour digital cable television channel. This recording session resulted in the band's fifth studio album Mish Mash!, which was released in November 2004 and peaked at number 52 on the ARIA charts.

The session were productive, with the group recording far more material than was required, and it was decided to release the excess material on an EP titled #*?! in August 2005. Band member Peter Kostic explained "#*?! is the stuff that didn't go on the album, because we didn't have room and didn't want to do a double album. We decided to hold onto it and release it later."

Amongst the usual fusion of pop, rock, hip-hop and electronica is a 34-minute ambient piece, "Pillowhead Orchestra"; Kostic said "We did that really late one night in the bubble... It was a Friday or Saturday night and there were a lot of people just hanging around outside. Part of it was to just put on a weird show for them.

== Track listing ==
No.	Title	Writer(s)	Length
1.	"Pretty Girls Swear"	Quan Yeomans	2:20
2.	"Sent by God 2 Get U Off"	Yeomans	4:20
3.	"The Rock"	Ben Ely	2:30
4.	"Pillowhead Orchestra"	Ely	33:46
5.	"Sent by God (Dub)"	Yeomans	4:31
Total length:			47:27

== Charts ==
Chart performance for Pillowhead
Chart (1996)	Peak position
Australia (ARIA)	122

== Release history ==
Region	Date	Format(s)	Label	Catalogue
Australia	August 2005	CD; Digital download	Valve Records	V68
