= Invader (Regurgitator album) =

Studio album by Regurgitator
- Released: 26 April 2024
- Length: 36:32
- Labels: Valve; ABC

Regurgitator chronology
Quarter Pounder: 25 Years of Being Consumed (2019)	Invader (2024)

Singles from Invader
- 1. "This Is Not a Pop Song" Released: 15 March 2024; 2. "Cocaine Runaway" Released: 12 April 2024; 3. "Epic" Released: 26 April 2024; 4. "Pest" Released: 10 May 2024; 5. "Tsunami" Released: 26 July 2024

Invader is the tenth studio album (eleventh including one as Regurgitator's Pogogo Show) by Australian rock band Regurgitator and was released on 26 April 2024. Invader is a self-produced work predominantly recorded and mixed by Quan and Geoff Wilson. The album also includes collaborations with Indigenous Australian rapper JK-47 on the track "Dirty Old Men" and Indigenous author and academic Tyson Yunkaporta on "The Bastard Poem No-One Wanted".

A supporting tour began soon after the album's release. The It's So Invasive Tour started in Hobart, Tasmania, and end in Cairns, Queensland, with 23 dates. Supporting acts across the tour will include Party Dozen, the Subculture Clique, Displeasure, Cry Club, Wolfpack, Monster Zoku Onsomb!, and Dubbzone.

At the AIR Awards of 2025, the album was nominated for Best Independent Punk Album or EP.

== Singles ==
First single "This Is Not a Pop Song" featuring Peaches was released on 15 March 2024 with the companion video following. The video has visual synth FX by Stephen Jones, a former member of Severed Heads and was edited by Yeomans. The second version is presented in a vertical 1080×1920 format. The track debuted at number 15 on the AIR Independent Label Singles Chart of 18 March 2024.

Second single "Cocaine Runaway" was released on 12 April 2024. Its video was directed and edited by Yeomans and features Brian Canham of Pseudo Echo. The clip also has two versions, with the second in a vertical 1080×1920 format.

The video for "Epic" was filmed at Golden Plains and released on 23 April 2024. It was promoted "as the latest track pre-empting the album release week’s end".

The video for "Pest" was by Ben Ely and Dan Baebler and released on 7 May 2024.

The video for "Tsunami" was directed by Ben Ely and Dan Baebler and released on 25 July 2024, with the band stating "The fifth video and single release from 10th studio album Invader".

== Reception ==
Professional ratings
Review scores
Source	Rating
The Guardian	4/5 stars

Andrew Stafford from The Guardian said "Themes of male violence, colonialism and spiritual emptiness dominate" and called the album "one of their finest".

Bec Harbour from The Live Wire said "My first thoughts on having a listen through is this is great. After a couple more listen throughs, it seems like the writing team of Quan Yeomans and Ben Ely have got their mojo back and then some. ".

== Track listing ==
1. "Cocaine Runaway" (lyrics and music by Quan Yeomans) – 3:44
2. "Pest" (lyrics and music by Ben Ely) – 2:30
3. "This Is Not a Pop Song" (featuring Peaches; lyrics by Yeomans and Merrill Nisker, music by Yeomans) – 2:40
4. "Australiyeah" (lyrics and music by Ely) – 2:50
5. "Epic" (lyrics and music by Yeomans) – 2:52
6. "That's Not Nermal" (lyrics and music by Ely) – 0:56
7. "Content" (lyrics and music by Yeomans) – 2:52
8. "The Bastard Poem That Nobody Wanted" (featuring Tyson Yunkaporta; lyrics by Yunkaporta, music by Regurgitator) – 2:45
9. "Invader" (lyrics and music by Yeomans) – 3:02
10. "The Edge of Losing It" (lyrics and music by Ely) – 2:02
11. "Dirty Old Men" (featuring JK-47; lyrics by Yeomans and JK-47, music by Yeomans) – 3:31
12. "Pee Pee Man" (lyrics and music by Ely) – 0:46
13. "Wrong People" (lyrics and music by Yeomans) – 2:01
14. "Tsunami" (lyrics and music by Ely) – 4:06

== Personnel ==
Regurgitator

- Ben Ely – performance, mixing (tracks 2, 4, 6, 10, 12)
- Quan Yeomans – performance (all tracks), mixing (tracks 1, 3, 7–9, 11)
- Peter Kostic – performance

Additional personnel

- Andrew Garton – saxophone (tracks 1, 3)
- Tony McCall – drums (tracks 4, 9)
- Hannah Macklin – background vocals (tracks 1, 3)
- Liam Eaton – percussion (track 10)

Technical personnel

- Greg Obis – mastering
- Richie Benetta – mixing (track 5)
- Greg Jard – mixing (tracks 13, 14)

== Charts ==
Chart performance for Invader
Chart (2024)	Peak position
Australian Physical Albums (ARIA)	50
