= Distractions (Regurgitator EP) =

2010 EP by Regurgitator

EP by Regurgitator
- Released: 10 September 2010
- Recorded: 2010
- Studio: Head Gap Studios, Preston, Victoria
- Length: 12:27
- Label: Valve
- Producer: Magoo

Regurgitator chronology
Love and Paranoia (2007)	Distractions (2010)	Super Happy Fun Times Friends (2011)

Singles from Distractions
- 1. "Make No Sense" Released: August 2010

Distractions is an extended play by Australian rock band Regurgitator and released in September 2010. The album was supported by a September Distractions tour.

== Background and release ==
Regurgitator were signed to Warner Australia between 1995-2002 and released four studio albums, before signing with Valve Records in 2004 and releasing two further albums, In 2010, the band decided to release music 'as they go along'. Band member Quan Yeomans said "Album production was initially geared to provide marketing impetus for the sale of records. More and more, people are not listening to music this way. They download music for free from the internet and they pick and choose tracks and create their own play lists." The band moved to Melbourne and set up a 'home studios' which Yeoman further explained "The new paradigm actually suits the home recording/producing musician because it is more natural to focus and create one track at a time, release it and then move on".

== Track listing ==
1. "Making No Sense" (Quan Yeomans) – 2:37
2. "Distractions" (Ben Ely) – 1:55
3. "Miranda July" (Yeomans) – 2:45
4. "Midday Sun" (Ely) – 5:10

== Personnel ==
- Ben Ely - bass
- Cameron Potts - drums
- Quan Yeomans - guitar and vocals

== Release history ==
Region	Date	Format(s)	Label	Catalogue
Australia	10 September 2010	CD; Digital download	Valve Records	V120
