= The Stalkers =

Australian rock band

- Origin: Australia
- Genres: Rock
- Years active: 2002
- Label: Valve/East West
- Spinoff of: Regurgitator
- Members: Ben Ely (guitar); Peter Kostic (drums); Ray Ahn (bass); Raymond Lalotoa (vocals)

The Stalkers are a rock band from Australia. They formed in April 2002 when Regurgitator was taking a break.

== Members ==
- Ben Ely (Regurgitator, Pangaea, Broken Head, Jump 2 Light Speed)
- Peter Kostic (Regurgitator, Front End Loader, Kryptonics, Hard-Ons, Nazxul)
- Ray Ahn (Hard-Ons, Nunchukka Superfly)
- Raymond Lalotoa

== Discography ==
- Rock 'n' Roll, EP (2002) - Valve
