= Regurgitator (EP) =

1994 EP by Regurgitator

EP by Regurgitator
- Released: 6 February 1995
- Recorded: 1994
- Studio: Red Zeds; Brisbane, Australia
- Length: 18:44
- Label: Warner Bros. Records (original release), East West (re-releases)
- Producer: Regurgitator, Magoo

Regurgitator chronology
Regurgitator (1995)	New (1995)

Regurgitator (also known as Hamburger) is the debut self-titled extended play (EP) by Australian rock band Regurgitator. The EP was released in February 1995 by Warner Music Australia and re-released in March 1995 by East West Records. The EP peaked at number 45 on the ARIA singles chart.

At the ARIA Music Awards of 1995, the EP was nominated for Best Adult Alternative Album.

== Singles ==
The EP was supported by two promotional/radio singles "Couldn't Do It" and "Like It Like That"; both of which had video clips; however, no official single was commercially released. Both received high rotation on Triple J.

== Artwork ==
The EP's cover was a picture of a hamburger. Andrew Stafford, in Pig City, said it "made explicit the comparison between record company 'product' and fast food." Drummer Lee instigated the use of the Warner Bros. logo on the back of the CD, which was removed from later issues. Ely later said, "They didn't let us use Bugs Bunny."

== Track listing ==
No.	Title	Writer(s)	Length
1.	"Like It Like That"	Quan Yeomans	4:19
2.	"Couldn't Do It"	Ben Ely	3:15
3.	"Hang Up"	Ely	2:47
4.	"Nothing to Say"	Ely	2:48
5.	"Pretend Friend"	Yeomans	2:12
6.	"Cynicism, Hypocrisy, Self Pitying, Isolation"	Martin Lee	2:55
7.	"In One Ear"	Ely	0:27
Total length:			18:44

On the East West releases of the EP, and on music streaming services, the last three tracks are combined.

== Charts ==
Chart (1995)	Peak position
Australia (ARIA)	45

NB: Regurgitator appeared on the Australian Singles Chart. For some sources, (such as Australian-charts), the title was "Couldn't Do It", for other sources (such as David Kent's The Australian Music Charts) the title is Regurgitator.

== Release history ==
Region	Date	Format(s)	Label	Catalogue	Notes	Ref.
Australia	February 6, 1995	CD	Warner Bros. Records	4509991422		
Australia	February 6, 1995	Cassette	Warner Bros. Records	4509991424		
Australia	March 6, 1995	CD	East West	4509997402	Tracks 5 to 7 are combined from this release forward	
Australia	March 6, 1995	Cassette	East West	4509997404	Tracks 5 to 7 are combined from this release forward	
Europe	1995	CD	East West	4509997402		
Australia	6 June 2014	LP	Valve Records	V135V	Split release with New (EP)	
