= Quarter Pounder: 25 Years of Being Consumed =

2019 greatest hits album by Regurgitator

Greatest hits album by Regurgitator
- Released: October 2019
- Recorded: 1994–2001
- Genre: Alternative rock; alternative hip hop; rap rock; electronica; electropop
- Length: 57:26
- Label: Warner Music Australia

Regurgitator chronology
The Really Really Really Really Boring Album (2019)	Quarter Pounder: 25 Years of Being Consumed (2019)	Invader (2024)

Quarter Pounder: 25 Years of Being Consumed is the second greatest hits album from the Australian rock band, Regurgitator. The album was released in October 2019 marking 25 years of the group. The album contains songs from their first four studio albums and various EPs. The album debuted at number 360 on the ARIA Charts.

The album was promoted with a tour in October and November 2019, titled Regurgitator – Quarter Pounder: 25 years of still being consumed! across 22 dates around Australia.

== Track listing ==
1. "! (The Song Formerly Known As)"
2. "Polyester Girl"
3. "Black Bugs"
4. "Kong Foo Sing"
5. "Everyday Formula"
6. "I Sucked a Lot of Cock to Get Where I Am"
7. "Blubber Boy"
8. "I Like Your Old Stuff Better Than Your New Stuff"
9. "Fat Cop"
10. "Super Straight"
11. "I Will Lick Your Arsehole"
12. "Modern Life"
13. "Happiness (Rotting My Brain)"
14. "Track 1"
15. "I Wanna Be a Nudist"
16. "Freshmint!"
17. "F.S.O."
18. "Couldn't Do It"
19. "Crush the Losers"

== 25 years of still being consumed! Tour ==
A 21-date tour was announced in July 2019. Opening acts included were Shonen Knife and The Fauves.

Date	Location	Country	Venue
4 October 2019	Clayton	Australia	Monash University
5 October 2019	San Remo	Australia	Westernport Hotel
6 October 2019	Caloundra	Australia	Caloundra Music Festival
11 October 2019	Cairns	Australia	Tanks Arts Centre
12 October 2019	Darwin	Australia	Darwin Surf Club
18 October 2019	Adelaide	Australia	The Gov
19 October 2019	Adelaide	Australia	The Gov
20 October 2019	Hobart	Australia	Uni Bar
24 October 2019	Canberra	Australia	The Basement
25 October 2019	Kingscliff	Australia	Kingscliff Beach Hotel
26 October 2019	Brisbane	Australia	The Tivoli
27 October 2019	Brisbane	Australia	The Tivoli
1 November 2019	Melbourne	Australia	Prince of Wales Hotel
2 November 2019	Melbourne	Australia	Corner Hotel
3 November 2019	Werribee	Australia	The Lost Lands
7 November 2019	Newcastle	Australia	Cambridge Hotel
8 November 2019	Sydney	Australia	Metro Theatre
9 November 2019	Sydney	Australia	Metro Theatre
10 November 2019	Wollongong	Australia	University of Wollongong
15 November 2019	Perth	Australia	Astor Theatre
16 November 2019	Fremantle	Australia	Metropolis Fremantle

== Release history ==
Region	Date	Format	Label	Catalogue
Australia	October 2019	CD, vinyl	Warner Music Australia	5419705533
