= Super Happy Fun Times Friends =

2011 studio album by Regurgitator

Studio album by Regurgitator
- Released: 5 August 2011
- Recorded: 2011
- Genre: Alternative rock
- Length: 32:36
- Label: Valve
- Producers: Ben Ely; Quan Yeomans

Regurgitator chronology
| Distractions (2010) | Super Happy Fun Times Friends (2011) | Dirty Pop Fantasy (2013) |

Singles from Super Happy Fun Times Friends
- 1. "One Day" Released: 19 June 2011; 2. "No Show" Released: 12 December 2011; 3. "Be Still My Noisy Mind" Released: 14 May 2012; 4. "All Fake Everything" Released: 19 September 2012

Super Happy Fun Times Friends is the seventh studio album by Australian rock band Regurgitator, and was released in Australia on 5 August 2011. The album peaked at No. 91 on the ARIA Albums Chart.

== Background and release ==
Regurgitator moved to Melbourne in 2010 and had planned on releasing individual songs on the internet as they were finished; with a number of tracks released throughout 2010. Two songs were released as a part of this experiment, "Evil Eye" and "NROB BMUD" (renamed as 'Born Dumb' on the album). After being quiet for some months the band debuted a new song "One Day" on Triple J and announced the new album on 19 June 2011. Since then "Game Over Dude", "All Fake Everything" and "Super Happy Funtime" from SuperHappyFunTimesFriends have been uploaded to the band's Bandcamp and SoundCloud accounts. The full album was made available upon the release date. The album was released in many non-traditional formats such as cassette, vinyl and PlayButton.

== Track listing ==
1. "One Day" (Q. Yeomans) – 2:25
2. "Game Over Dude" (B. Ely) – 0:21
3. "All Fake Everything" (Q. Yeomans) – 4:26
4. "Super Happy Funtime" (B. Ely) – 1:46
5. "Punk Mum" (Q. Yeomans) – 2:15
6. "Be Still My Noisy Mind" (B. Ely) – 2:49
7. "D.M.T 4 2" (B. Ely) – 1:41
8. "No Show" (Q. Yeomans) – 3:14
9. "Uncontactable" (B. Ely) – 2:00
10. "Into the Night" (Q. Yeomans) – 3:04
11. "Devil Spell" (B. Ely) – 2:02
12. "Born Dumb" (Q. Yeomans) – 2:26
13. "Outer Space" (B. Ely) – 3:04
14. "8pm" (B. Ely) – 1:10

== Charts ==
| Chart (2011) | Peak position |
|---|---|
| Australian Albums (ARIA) | 91 |

== Release history ==
| Region | Date | Format | Label | Catalogue |
|---|---|---|---|---|
| Australia | 5 August 2011 | CD; digital download; LP | Valve Records | V123 |
