= The Drop (Regurgitator song) =

2004 single by Regurgitator

Single by Regurgitator

from the album Mish Mash!
- Released: 4 October 2004
- Recorded: September 2004
- Studio: In a bubble at Federation Square, Melbourne
- Length: 3:02
- Label: Valve Records
- Producer(s): Magoo

Regurgitator singles chronology
| "Bong in My Eye" (2004) | "The Drop" (2004) | "My Friend Robot" (2004) |

Music video
- "The Drop" on YouTube

"The Drop" is a song by Australian rock band Regurgitator. The song was released in October 2004 as the lead single from the band's fifth studio album Mish Mash!, which was recorded in a bubble in Federation Square, Melbourne, as part of Australian music channel, Channel V's Band in a Bubble program, in which the band entered a small glass recording studio while the public could watch the band work, or tune into a 24-hour digital cable television channel. Upon release, "The Drop" was the 10th most added song to radio and has become a top 5 request on Channel V. The song peaked at number 69 on the Australian ARIA Charts.

The song was voted in at number 85 in the Triple J Hottest 100, 2004.

== Track listing ==
CD Single
| No. | Title | Length |
|---|---|---|
| 1. | "The Drop" | 3:02 |
| 2. | "Krahl 1 - Spod 0" | 4:42 |
| 3. | "Harder Faster" | 0:34 |
| 4. | "He's a Punk" | 3:08 |
| 5. | "The Drop" (Dragon Monkey Remix) | 3:38 |

== Charts ==
Chart performance for "The Drop"
| Chart (2004) | Peak position |
|---|---|
| Australia (ARIA) | 69 |

== Release history ==
| Region | Date | Format | Label | Catalogue |
|---|---|---|---|---|
| Australia | 4 October 2004 | CD Single | Valve Records | V62 |
