= Love and Paranoia =

2007 studio album by Regurgitator

Studio album by Regurgitator
- Released: 15 September 2007
- Recorded: June 2007
- Genre: Alternative rock
- Length: 31:42
- Label: Valve
- Producer: Regurgitator

Regurgitator chronology
Pillowhead (2005)	Love and Paranoia (2007)	Distractions (2010)

Singles from Love and Paranoia
- 1. "Blood and Spunk" Released: 2007; 2. "Romance of the Damned" Released: 2008

Professional ratings
Review scores
Source	Rating
Polaroids of Androids	5.8/10
PopMatters	3/10 stars

Love and Paranoia is the sixth studio album by Australian rock band Regurgitator. It was released in Australia on 15 September 2007 and was inspired by 1980s rock. The majority of the album was recorded mid-2007 in Brazil. The album is also the first to feature Seja Vogel, who provides keyboards and vocals.

The first single was "Blood and Spunk", which received high rotation on Triple J. The animated video for the track was produced by Quan Yeomans in Hong Kong. As the album's title track suggests, several songs are unguardedly romantic, while others touch on the paranoia, fear and resulting insularity of the political climate of the 2000s.

The band toured the album extensively throughout Australia and it was also featured on the 2008 Big Day Out tour. In October 2008, the band headed to the UK, where it had not played for five years, in support of the release before heading to Asia, including their first tour of China, to finish the tour.

== Track listing ==
1. "Blood and Spunk" (Q. Yeomans) – 3:01
2. "Drinking Beer is Awesome!" (B. Ely) – 2:10
3. "Romance of the Damned" (S. Vogel/Q. Yeomans) – 3:20
4. "Love and Paranoia" (Q. Yeomans) – 3:51
5. "Hurricane" (B. Ely) – 2:02
6. "Destroy This Town" (Q. Yeomans) – 3:19
7. "Psychic Dirt" (B. Ely) – 3:05
8. "Sun Comes Thru My Window" (B. Ely) – 0:42
9. "(Ad Spot)" (Q. Yeomans) – 0:36
10. "Magnetic" (S. Vogel) – 2:54
11. "Michelle" (Q. Yeomans) – 2:39
12. "Armageddon Premonition" (B. Ely) – 4:03

== Charts ==
Chart performance for Love and Paranoia
Chart (2007)	Peak position
Australian Albums (ARIA)	74

== Release history ==
Release history and formats for Love and Paranoia
Region	Date	Format	Label	Catalogue
Australia	17 September 2007	CD; digital download	Valve	V92
