= Headroxx =

2018 studio album by Regurgitator

Studio album by Regurgitator
- Released: 1 August 2018
- Studio: Greg's Byron Bay, Wild Mountain Sound
- Genre: Alternative rock
- Length: 34:57
- Label: Valve
- Producer: Regurgitator

Regurgitator chronology
Dirty Pop Fantasy (2013)	Headroxx (2018)	The Really Really Really Really Boring Album (2019)

Headroxx is the ninth studio album by Australian alternative rock band Regurgitator, released on 1 August 2018 through Valve Records. It was preceded by a 21 April Record Store Day exclusive double A-side vinyl of "Don't Stress"/"Light Me On Fire". It was followed by the Life Support Tour around Australia with dates throughout August 2018.

== Recording and composition ==
After the hiatus soon after the release of 2013's Dirty Pop Fantasy the group came back together after contact by Paul Curtis. "What generally happens is Paul [Curtis, the band's manager] says 'Oh, you've got to do a record, we've got a tour coming up, let's do it now'. And we're like, oh god, OK!" The record was recorded quickly compared to some previous ventures; at both Ben and Quan's homes and at Greg's Byron Bay + Wild Mountain Sound. "It was funny because when we showed each other our songs they seemed to have this common thread of being a little bit psychologically messed up in the modern world and dealing with the pressures of where the world's at now," Ben explained. "All of the songs seemed to have this common thread about them and that's why we called the album Headroxx; it's kind of like rock songs about your psychological state."

Soon after the supporting tour the group continued work towards The Really Really Really Really Boring Album, their first venture into children's records to be released in 2019.

== Reception ==
Andrew Bartlett of 4zzz wrote, "There are some real gems contained in this release, in amongst the fun and floating around in musical thought bubbles". while Jacob Colliver of beat.com.au stated, "Headroxx is well-made and well-stated, but never grim or pretentious. Regurgitator continue an untarnished legacy doing what they do best." Colliver rated the album 8 out of 10.

== Track listing ==
1. "Headroxx" – 1:05
2. "Roxx for Brains" – 2:54
3. "Graffiti Is Coming Alive" – 3:20
4. "Party Looks" – 3:46
5. "Not Alone" – 4:04
6. "Weird Kind of Hard" – 3:20
7. "No Point" – 1:41
8. "Light Me On Fire" – 2:39
9. "Don't Stress" – 3:40
10. "I Get the Internet" – 3:08
11. "Fortress" – 2:16
12. "The Spirit of Ian Curtis" – 2:13

== Life Support Tour ==
A 18-date tour was announced in May 2018. Opening acts included were Glitoris and The Stress Of Leisure.

Date	Location	Country	Venue
2 August 2018	Newcastle	Australia	Cambridge Hotel
3 August 2018	Sydney	Australia	Metro Theatre
4 August 2018	Wollongong	Australia	Servo
4 August 2018	Canberra	Australia	The Basement
5 August 2018	Albury	Australia	SS&A Club
9 August 2018	Geelong	Australia	Wool Exchange
10 August 2018	Melbourne	Australia	170 Russell
11 August 2018	Hobart	Australia	Republic Bar
12 August 2018	Hobart	Australia	Republic Bar
17 August 2018	Adelaide	Australia	The Gov
18 August 2018	Perth	Australia	Badlands
19 August 2018	Perth	Australia	Badlands
24 August 2018	Kingscliff	Australia	Kingscliff Beach Hotel
25 August 2018	Brisbane	Australia	The Tivoli
26 August 2018	Sunshine Coast	Australia	Solbar
15 March 2019	Auckland	New Zealand	Whammy Bar
16 March 2019	Raglan	New Zealand	The Yot Club
17 March 2019	Wellington	New Zealand	Valhalla
