= Jingles (album) =

2002 greatest hits album by Regurgitator

Greatest hits album by Regurgitator
- Released: October 2002
- Genre: Alternative rock; alternative hip hop; rap rock; electronica; electropop
- Label: Warner Music Australia

Regurgitator chronology
Eduardo and Rodriguez Wage War on T-Wrecks (2001)	Jingles (2002)	Mish Mash! (2004)

Jingles is the first greatest hits album from the Australian rock band, Regurgitator. The album was released in October 2002 and is the band's final release on Warner Music Australia.

The album contains songs from their first four studio albums and various EPs and includes one previously unreleased song, "Disco Crazy".

== Track listing ==
1. "Kong Foo Sing"
2. "I Wanna Be a Nudist"
3. "! (The Song Formerly Known As)"
4. "Hullabaloo"
5. "Track 1"
6. "Super Straight"
7. "I Sucked a Lot of Cock to Get Where I Am"
8. "Blubber Boy"
9. "Happiness (Rotting My Brain)"
10. "Everyday Formula"
11. "F.S.O."
12. "Miffy's Simplicity"
13. "Polyester Girl"
14. "I Like It Like That"
15. "Black Bugs"
16. "Freshmint!"
17. "Couldn't Do it"
18. "Modern Life"
19. "Fat Cop"
20. "Crush the Losers"
21. "Disco Crazy"

== Charts ==
Chart performance for Jingles
Chart (2002)	Peak position
Australian Albums (ARIA)	117

== Release history ==
Region	Date	Format	Label	Catalogue
Australia	October 2002	CD	EastWest Records	0927491682
