= Mish Mash! =

2004 studio album by Regurgitator

Studio album by Regurgitator
- Released: 15 November 2004
- Recorded: 31 August – 21 September 2004
- Venue: in a bubble at Federation Square, Melbourne
- Genre: Alternative rock, rap rock
- Length: 50:33
- Label: Valve
- Producer: Magoo

Regurgitator chronology
Jingles (2002)	Mish Mash! (2004)	Pillowhead (2005)

Singles from Mish Mash!
- 1. "The Drop" Released: October 2004; 2. "My Friend Robot" Released: December 2004; 3. "My Ego" Released: February 2005

Mish Mash! is the fifth studio album from Australian rock band Regurgitator. Mish Mash! was released on 15 November 2004 and peaked at number 52 on the ARIA Charts.

The band's drummer, Peter Kostic, told The Age the band had wanted to dig deep to find the inspiration for the album, saying: "It was really positive. It enabled us to block out everything else that was happening and focus on recording. We worked really quickly as a result. I don't think this would have been as good a record had we not done this."

Speaking in 2005, Kostic said, "I'm really happy with the record. If I had gone through all that and in the end come out with a record that I wasn't personally pleased with, I would be pretty distraught."

== Background and release ==
The album was the result of the Band in a Bubble project, a new reality TV–inspired media stunt sponsored and broadcast by Australian music channel Channel V. The band entered a small glass recording studio, built in Federation Square in the centre of Melbourne, to record the album. Pedestrians could look into most rooms of the "bubble" and could watch the band work, or tune into a 24-hour digital cable television channel and watch the band work. Nobody could enter or leave the bubble. In addition to the three band members, Australian producer Magoo, engineer Hugh and Channel V host Jabba were all also locked into the bubble with the band.

Yeomans later explained, "It was based on the idea of Big Brother but also doing something creative in the space. When I was living in London I'd seen David Blaine sitting in a bubble just doing nothing and Paul [Curtis, manager] had talked about doing it a long time ago. We just kinda woke up with, like, crowds of people staring at us in our underpants and stuff – it was super surreal."

The album was issued on vinyl by Valve in October 2013.

== Track listing ==
1. "The Drop" – 3:06
2. "My Friend Robot" – 2:58
3. "I, Zombie" – 3:16
4. "Shopping Mall Soul" – 2:47
5. "The Game" – 4:15
6. "My Computer Crashed" – 2:22
7. "Metal Is Big in the Baltic States" – 2:12
8. "Sonnet of a Media Mogul" – 4:05
9. "My Ego" – 3:20
10. "Don't Go 2 Sleep" – 2:13
11. "Mish Mash!" – 1:06
12. "I'm Sensible" – 2:38
13. "If This is the Blues, Why Do I Feel So Green?" – 3:43
14. "I Was Sent by God to Get You Off" – 5:15
15. "Rap For Kids" (hidden track) – 6:17

Following the end of "I Was Sent by God to Get You Off", there is one minute of silence before "Rap for Kids" plays; album pressings list "I Was Sent by God to Get You Off" as 12:32.

== Charts ==
Chart performance for Mish Mash!
Chart (2004)	Peak position
Australian Albums (ARIA)	52

== Release history ==
Release history and formats for Mish Mash!
Region	Date	Format	Label	Catalogue
Australia	November 2004	CD	Valve	V63
United States	27 April 2009	CD		
Australia	October 2013	Digital download; streaming; LP	Valve	V131V
