= Jump 2 Light Speed =

Australian band

- Origin: Brisbane, Queensland, Australia

Jump 2 Light Speed is an Australian band from Brisbane, Queensland fronted by Ben Ely.

== Members ==
- Ben Ely bass & vocals (Regurgitator, Pangaea, Broken Head, The Stalkers)
- Stella Mozgawa drums 2005–2006 (Holidays on Ice)
- Tim Browning drums 2006–2007 (The Shake Up, Athol)
- Steve Bourke guitar & vocals (Channel V host)
- Keita Tarlinton keyboards & vocals

== Discography ==
- Spooky Fun (2006) - Valve
- "I Am Your Friend in Fire" (2006)
