= New (EP) =

1995 EP by Regurgitator

EP by Regurgitator
- Released: 13 August 1995
- Studio: Red Zeds; Brisbane, Australia
- Length: 20:27
- Label: East West/WEA Australia; Reprise/Warner Bros. Records
- Producer: Magoo

Regurgitator chronology
Regurgitator (1994)	New (1995)	Tu-Plang (1996)

New is the second extended play (EP) by Australian rock band Regurgitator. The EP was released in August 1995 and peaked at number 30 on the ARIA singles chart.

At the ARIA Music Awards of 1996, it was nominated for Highest Selling Single.

== Singles ==
The EP was supported by two promotional/radio singles "Track 1" and "Blubber Boy"; both of which had video clips; however, no official single was commercially released. "Blubber Boy" polled at number 17 on the Triple J Hottest 100, 1995.

== Track listing ==
1. "Track 1" - 2:48
2. "Power Tool" - 2:04
3. "Blubber Boy" - 2:35
4. "Gravey" - 3:19
5. "7'10"" - 9:34

== Charts ==
Chart (1995/96)	Peak position
Australia (ARIA)	30

== Release history ==
Region	Date	Format(s)	Label	Catalogue
Australia	13 August 1995	CD	East West	11763
United States	October 1995	CD; cassette	Reprise/Warner Bros.	46437
