= Ritardando (album) =

2011 album by Northlane

Studio album by Front End Loader
- Released: May 2011
- Studio: Megaphon Studios, The 70s Mansion
- Length: 36:57
- Label: Weeping Anus Records

Front End Loader chronology
Laughing with Knives (2008)	Ritardando (2011)	Neutral Evil (2018)

Ritardando is the fifth studio album by Australian rock band, Front End Loader. It was released in May 2011.

At the ARIA Music Awards of 2011, the album won the award for Best Hard Rock or Heavy Metal Album.

At the AIR Awards of 2011, the album was nominated for Best Independent Hard Rock/Punk Album.

== Track listing ==
1. "But Before I Do"
2. "Bury Your Dead, Mademoiselle"
3. "Decisions, Decisions, Decisions"
4. "Bring It On"
5. "Once Again"
6. "Lily White"
7. "The Duality of Man"
8. "I Like to Help Out Where I Can"
9. "Bronzed Up"
10. "Standards"
11. "My Other Pants"
12. "Tool for a Tool"
13. "The Anger Dollar"
