= Blubber Boy =

1995 single by Regurgitator

- UK CD single cover

Single by Regurgitator

from the album New
- Released: 1995
- Recorded: 1995
- Studio: Red Zeds
- Length: 2:43
- Label: Warner Music Australasia
- Songwriter: Quan Yeomans
- Producers: Magoo, Regurgitator

Regurgitator singles chronology
"Track 1" (1995)	"Blubber Boy" (1995)	"F.S.O." (1996)

"Blubber Boy" is a song by Australian rock band Regurgitator. The song was released as a radio single in Australia in 1995 promoting the band's second EP New (1995). The song was released in the UK as a CD and 7" Single. The song ranked at number 17 on Triple J's Hottest 100 in 1995. A remixed version of the song (Riding the Wave of Fashion Mix) was released on the band's debut studio album, Tu-Plang in 1996.

== Details ==
Yeomans had been inspired by a book on feminist fairy-tales give to him by Kiley Gaffney. Ely said, "Quan brought the song into practice and Martin and I were going, "Are you sure you want to do this?' To us it was uncool because it wasn't in 7/8 time. But it felt good. And he said the word 'cunt' in it quite a lot. So then we were like, he's swearing, it must be OK." Of all the Inuit-based fairy tales in that book, "Blubber Boy" was the tamest one, according to Yeomans.

== Reception ==
In 2019, Tyler Jenke from The Brag ranked Regurgitator's best songs, with "Blubber Boy" coming it at number 3. Jenke said "It's not often that bands get their start by singing a song based upon an Inuit fairytale about drowned boyfriends and blubber… replacements, but Regurgitator aren't exactly a normal band. A prime example of their early talent, 'Blubber Boy' is still a tune whose chorus commands a massive singalong during a live show."

Andrew Stafford, in Pig City, called it "Unabashed pop, instantly memorable, with a lyric as ribald as it was eccentric."

== Live performances ==
In support of their album Tu-Plang, Regurgitator performed "Blubber Boy" (alongside singles "F.S.O." and "Kong Foo Sing") on the Australian music show Recovery. Looking back at that performance in a 2019 interview with the band, Dylan Lewis, the show's host, was surprised at how they got away with performing the song on a Saturday morning TV timeslot, considering its lyric. Yeomans considers the Recovery performance to be "one of my proudest moments from the early days [of Regurgitator]".

== Track listings ==
UK CD Single
No.	Title	Length
1.	"Blubber Boy"	2:43
2.	"Power Tool"	2:02
3.	"Gravey"	3:18

== Release history ==
Region	Date	Format	Label	Catalogue	Ref.
Australia	1995	Radio promo	EastWest, Warner	n/a	
United Kingdom	13 October 1997	CD single	Coalition Recordings, EastWest	COLA 017CD	
United Kingdom	13 October 1997	7"	Coalition Recordings, EastWest	COLA 017	
