= The Boat Show (band) =

Music group from Brisbane, Queensland

- Origin: Brisbane, Australia
- Genres: Alternative rock, pop rock, post-grunge
- Years active: 2000
- Label: BMG Australia
- Past members: Martin Lee; Matthew Strong; Glenn Lewis; John Canniffe

The Boat Show was a Brisbane-based band that formed early 2000 with Matthew Strong of Custard and Martin Lee of Regurgitator after Custard disbanded and Martin left Regurgitator. Glenn Lewis was lead vocal and bass, John Canniffe guitar and vocal.

One EP was recorded, which was released on 18 July 2000.
