= Dirty Pop Fantasy =

2013 studio album by Regurgitator

Studio album by Regurgitator
- Released: 6 September 2013
- Genre: Alternative rock
- Length: 42:00
- Label: Valve
- Producer: Regurgitator

Regurgitator chronology
Super Happy Fun Times Friends (2011)	Dirty Pop Fantasy (2013)	Headroxx (2018)

Dirty Pop Fantasy is the eighth studio album by Australian alternative rock band Regurgitator. The album was first streamed on 23 August 2013 on the music streaming website Deezer and officially released on 6 September 2013 on the record label Valve Records. Regurgitator toured from September to December 2013.

== Recording and composition ==
The album was written and recorded in Hong Kong. Ely said, "We got this warehouse apartment in a nine-story walk-up. It was an old yoga studio so it was pretty barebones – it was like a concrete block – and we just slept on the floor. We didn’t have our gear or drum kits or anything. We were just riding with acoustic guitars and ukuleles and practice amps, but I guess that was a bonus, really, because it made us focus on the songs rather than the sounds." Elsewhere, he said, "It is always good I think, to take yourself out of your comfort zone and away from your friends and family. Once you were in the room you couldn't really leave unless you were prepared to walk up and down again."

Ely said, "Every time we make a record we try to lift the weird envelope a little bit higher. It's funny, anything can be a Regurgitator song. That's how we like it. We were originally going to make a double-album and call it Album Album and each song was going to be called two of the same word, like "Brain Brain"." On the title, Yeomans said, "I think Id been listening to Prince or something. And it seemed like a really appropriate name. It rolls out of your face, I think, pretty well."

== Reception ==
The Sydney Morning Herald said, "Regurgitator have lost none of their capacity to write and record great songs. Indeed, they have improved with age, become more poignant, less critical and more insane. The kind of insane that makes art out of cliche and forces you to nod in understated appreciation. What a special album."

The Music asked, "Is the album title Regurgitator's almost apologetic confession to indulging completely in their own retro, dirty pop weaknesses? With only five of its 19 tracks breaking the three-minute barrier, Dirty Pop Fantasy never messes around in getting to the point." Kill Your Stereo wrote, "the album feels more like a showcase that demonstrates the capability of good pop aesthetics – however it's expressed stylistically – rather than a bunch of ill-fitting, mismatched tracks simply mashed together awkwardly". The West Australian agreed, "We've come to expect stylistically scattershot offerings from Brisvegas veterans Regurgitator but their latest album takes genre-hopping and twisting to the next level, blasting 19 completely different tracks in our faces in under 42 minutes".

== Track listing ==
1. "Brain Brain" – 0:31
2. "Sine Wave" – 2:13
3. "Made to Break" – 3:20
4. "Mountains" – 3:12
5. "So Tuff" – 1:06
6. "My Little Terrorist" – 2:40
7. "Dolphin Chakra Alignment" – 0:40
8. "Home Alone Stoned" – 2:12
9. "Answering Machine" – 2:09
10. "Hong Kong" – 1:45
11. "Dirty Pop Fantasy" – 1:39
12. "Fuck You Sweetness" – 3:49
13. "Bongzilla" – 2:38
14. "Can't Stop" – 3:59
15. "March of Thor" – 0:33
16. "We Love You!" – 2:33
17. "Fucking Up!" – 2:22
18. "///////o\\\\\\\" – 1:00
19. "Fantasyland" – 3:29

== Charts ==
Chart performance for Dirty Pop Fantasy
Chart (2013)	Peak position
Australian Albums (ARIA)	123
