= The Really Really Really Really Boring Album =

2019 studio album by Regurgitator's Pogogo Show

Studio album by Regurgitator's Pogogo Show
- Released: 1 March 2019
- Genre: Children's music
- Length: 34:59
- Label: Valve; ABC Music
- Producer: Regurgitator

Regurgitator albums chronology
Headroxx (2018)	The Really Really Really Really Boring Album (2019)	Quarter Pounder: 25 Years of Being Consumed (2019)

Singles from The Really Really Really Really Boring Album
- 1. "The Pogogo Show Theme" Released: 26 July 2019 (as Regurgitator's Pogogo Show); 2. "The Box" Released: 26 July 2019; 3. "Best Friends Forever" Released: 27 September 2019

The Really Really Really Really Boring Album is the tenth studio and first children's album by Australian rock band, Regurgitator, (credited as Regurgitator's Pogogo Show) and was released in Australia on 1 March 2019.

The album was recorded with children's guitars and drums, tracked in a single afternoon in a Melbourne studio, and mixed the next day. Ben Ely said: "Kids don't think about things, they just act; they don't think, 'I'm going to draw a fire truck', they just draw a fire truck. There's not very many premeditated ideas."

At the ARIA Music Awards of 2019, the album was nominated for Best Children's Album.

At the AIR Awards of 2020, the album won Best Independent Children's Album or EP.

== Reception ==
Professional ratings
Review scores
Source	Rating
The Music AU	4/5 stars

Jeff Jenkins from Stack Magazine said "Regurgitator have always been perverse purveyors of pop" and reviewed the album saying; "Call them the anti-Wiggles, but they'll entertain the kids – and parents – with an eclectic array of electro sounds and repetitive rhymes, beating boredom with wonderfully wacky tunes about pets, pillow fights, parties and pigeons."

Liz Giuffre from The Music AU said "Think the best of The Muppets – engaging but not patronising – while also keeping true to the Gurge's love of quirkiness. Highlights include 'Games On My Computer', Pillow Fight' and 'The Morning Theme'."

Andrew Stafford from The Guardian said "Brisbane rock band embrace their silly side and collaborate with their kids, and the result is anything but boring."

Ian Phillips from PS News said "Regurgitator has always come across as a knock about fun band who have never really developed the overblown egos and attitudes of most rock stars. Although they do take their music seriously they've always enjoyed mucking about and having fun. So, now that they're parents, it seems a natural progression that they decide to record an album of songs for kids. The result is an album and show that is anything but boring." [...] "It's a Regurgitator album that just happens to be written for kids. There are all the usual Regurgitator elements, a mix of punk, hip hop, pop, and funk but the songs content is squarely aimed at the preoccupations of kids."

== Track listing ==
No.	Title	Writer(s)	Length
1.	"Fanfare (Intro)"	Ben Ely, Peter Kostic, Jerico Wallace, Quan Yeomans	0:34
2.	"Pogogo Show (Theme)"	B. Ely, Kostic, Wallace, Yeomans	2:24
3.	"Favourite Song"	Anouk Ely, B. Ely, Kostic, Wallace, Yeomans	2:05
4.	"I Don't Wanna Dog"	A. Ely, B. Ely, Kostic, Wallace, Yeomans	2:21
5.	"Games on My Computer"	B. Ely, Kostic, Wallace, Yeomans	1:46
6.	"Pillow Fight"	B. Ely, Kostic, Wallace, Yeomans	0:57
7.	"The Morning (Theme)"	B. Ely, Kostic, Wallace, Yeomans	1:01
8.	"Pigeon Riding on a Motorcycle"	B. Ely, Kostic, Wallace, Yeomans	2:34
9.	"Party Party Party!"	B. Ely, D. Ely, Kostic, Wallace, Yeomans	1:34
10.	"The Box"	B. Ely, Kostic, Wallace, Yeomans	2:23
11.	"Ghost Cat"	B. Ely, Kostic, Wallace, Yeomans	1:55
12.	"Pogogo Show Story Time"	D. Ely	2:09
13.	"Mr Butt"	B. Ely, D Ely, Kostic, Wallace, Yeomans	1:12
14.	"Farting Is a Part of Life"	B. Ely, D Ely, Kostic, Wallace, Yeomans	1:38
15.	"Best Friends Forever"	B. Ely, Kostic, Wallace, Yeomans	1:06
16.	"Corumbo!"	B. Ely, Kostic, Wallace, Yeomans	1:06
17.	"The Robots"	B. Ely, Kostic, Wallace, Yeomans	7:05

== Release history ==
Region	Date	Format	Label	Catalogue
Australia	1 March 2019	CD; digital download; LP	Valve Records, ABC Music	V156
