= Happyland (band) =

Australian punk rock duo

- Also known as: The Shits
- Origin: Brisbane, Queensland, Australia
- Genres: Art pop; punk; metal
- Years active: 1997–1999
- Labels: Polydor
- Past members: Janet English; Quan Yeomans

Happyland was an Australian punk rock duo formed in Brisbane, Queensland, in 1997 as a side project by Janet English on bass guitar and lead vocals (from Spiderbait) and her then-boyfriend, Quan Yeomans (from Regurgitator) on lead guitar and vocals. They were initially named the Shampoodles but decided on Happyland. Their only album, Welcome to Happyland, was released on 25 August 1998, via the Polydor Australia label, which reached No. 18 on the ARIA Albums Chart. It provided the single, "Don't You Know Who I Am?" (July 1998), which peaked at No. 24 on the ARIA Singles Chart.

== History ==
In 1996, Janet English of Spiderbait started dating Quan Yeomans of Regurgitator. During downtime from their respective main projects, in 1997 in Brisbane, the pair formed the Shits (later renamed as Happyland) as an art pop side project. As the Shits, English and Yeomans, provided the artwork for Regurgitor's album, Unit (November 1997), at the ARIA Music Awards of 1998, the duo won the Best Cover Art category.

Happyland's only album, Welcome to Happyland, was released on 25 August 1998 via Polydor Australia, which peaked at No. 18 on the ARIA Albums Chart. It was recorded in Yeomans' home studio and produced by the duo, with all tracks co-written by English and Yeomans. AllMusic's Jody Macgregor opined that "The songs they recorded together combined the most hyper-kinetic and poppy sounds common to the two bands, with English's vocals at their most high-pitched and girlish, and Yeomans' melodies at their most twitchy and infectious." Australian musicologist Ian McFarlane felt it "boasted noisy modern fuzz-pop." At the ARIA Music Awards of 1999, English and Yeomans were nominated for Best Cover Art for Welcome to Happyland.

"Don't You Know Who I Am?", the lead single from the album, peaked at No. 24 on the ARIA Singles Chart. It was listed at No. 28 in Triple J's 1998 Hottest 100 music poll, while the follow-up single, "Hello!" (November 1998), was listed at No. 71. "Hello!", which did not peak in the ARIA Singles Chart top 50, was proposed for Regurgitator's Unit, but it did not fit with the rest of its content. McFarlane described "Hello" as "low-tech but snappy pop."

Happyland toured Australia as part of the 1999 Big Day Out music festival, performing at the Gold Coast, Sydney, Melbourne, and Adelaide in late January and early February. In their live shows, the band members dressed in fluffy animal costumes. They provided a cover version of the Italian song, "Tintarella di luna" (written by Bruno de Filippi and Franco Migliacci), on the soundtrack for the feature film, Looking for Alibrandi, in 2000. The duo had disbanded in 1999, and each member had returned to their respective main project.

Quan mentioned in a 2001 interview in the Daily Telegraph that Happyland was working on another release. This is backed up by a comment made by Quan, when asked, "Will there be any more Happyland releases?" on a web chat for Rolling Stone Australia, in October 2000, he answered, "We may have a song or three for the willing and able out there." However, both have stated that this is unlikely, as they have since split up as a domestic couple, but remain good friends. In August 2004, English replied to the notion of a reunion, "A Happyland comeback? (laughs) [It] was just the one-off thing; it was a bit of fun when we had time off from our respective bands. The way that the momentum is going on this stuff [Spiderbait commitments] overseas and Europe, I can't imagine I'll have a lot of time to deal with anything like that."

== Discography ==
=== Albums ===
List of albums, with selected details and chart positions
Title	Album details	Peak chart positions
Title	Album details	AUS
Welcome to Happyland	Released: August 1998; Format: CD; Label: Polydor (527 979-2)	18

=== Singles ===
List of singles, with selected chart positions
Title	Year	Peak chart positions	Album
Title	Year	AUS	Album
"Don't You Know Who I Am?"	1998	24	Welcome to Happyland
"Hello!"	1998	79	Welcome to Happyland

== Awards and nominations ==
=== ARIA Music Awards ===
The ARIA Music Awards is an annual awards ceremony that recognises excellence, innovation, and achievement in all genres of Australian music. It commenced in 1987.

Year	Nominee / work	Award	Result	Ref.
1998	Quan Yeomans and Janet English for Happyland – Welcome to Happyland	Best Cover Art	Nominated	
