= Front End Loader =

Australian rock band

- Origin: Sydney, New South Wales, Australia
- Genre: Rock
- Years active: 1991–present
- Labels: Survival, Shagpile / Shock, Redline, Illustrious Artists, Fuse, Weeping Anus / MGM
- Members: Bowden Campbell; Davis Claymore; Richard Corey; Peter Kostic
- Website: frontendloaderband.com

Front End Loader are an Australian rock band which formed in December 1991 with founding mainstays, Bowden Campbell on guitar and vocals; Davis Claymore on lead vocals and guitar; Richard Corey on bass guitar; and Peter Kostic on drums. Front End Loader have issued six studio albums, Front End Loader (June 1993), Let's Ride! (March 1995), Last of the V8 Interceptors (August 1997), How Can We Fail When We're So Sincere? (March 2002), Ritardando (6 May 2011) and Neutral Evil (2018). At the ARIA Music Awards of 2011 Front End Loader won an award for Ritardando as Best Hard Rock/Heavy Metal Album. Kostic has also drummed for fellow Australian groups Regurgitator (1999–present) and The Hard-Ons (2002–2011).

== History ==
=== 1991-1993: Front End Loader ===
Front End Loader were formed in December 1991 in the Sydney suburb of Darlington. Founding mainstays are Bowden Campbell on guitar and vocals; and Davis Claymore on lead vocals and guitar – who had broken away from Edelweiss, their previous band – together with Richard Corey on bass guitar; and Peter Kostic on drums – both from Perth-formed group, Kryptonics. The new group were named 'Front End Loader' – which was originally chosen as "a ridiculous, strictly temporary title, until something better came up. Ha" – to enter into a Sydney University band competition. They made the final alongside Frenzal Rhomb but both lost out to another group.

In January 1993 Front End Loader appeared at the Sydney venue of the Big Day Out concert series. In the next month they issued their debut singles "Weak as Piss" and "'Fraid Knot". Their debut album was the self-titled, Front End Loader, which was released in the June 1993. It was recorded at Powerhouse Studios and was produced by the group with Paul Tagg. Australian musicologist, Ian McFarlane, felt it "highlighted the band's sense of humour and gritty, unrestrained brand of thrash rock". In September that year they supported an Australian tour by Canadian group, No Means No.

=== 1994-2000: Adolescent Fantasy World, Let's Ride! & Last of the V8 Interceptors ===
In June 1994 Front End Loader released the EP, Adolescent Fantasy World, and followed with a split single, "Heightened State of Awareness" backed by a track from Melbourne-based psychobilly band, Fireballs. In October that year Front End Loader toured Europe supporting No Means No. Their second album, Let's Ride!, as well as its lead single, "Be Jesus", were released in March 1995 by Shagpile Records and distributed by Shock Records. They had been recorded in September 1994 at Q Studios and mixed at Eclipse Studios with David Price and the group producing. Together the material "mixed brawn with irony, complex riffs with eccentric humour" according to McFarlane. Rachel Hill of The Canberra Times felt the album "deserves a second hearing ... [as it] takes the fearless on a ... full-strength adventure of emotion and power". In November 1995 they supported No Means No on an Australian tour.

Campbell formed a side project, the Impossibles, in 1996, as an alternative rock group. Fellow members were Dave Aston on drums (of Trout Fishing in Quebec), Geoff Martin on bass guitar (Imp) and Brendan Smyly on saxophone and vocals (Andy 500). Cameron and Smyly had met working behind the bar at the Sandringham Hotel, Newtown and Smyly had guested on an album by Front End Loader. The Impossibles released an eight-track EP, Blanket Show, in 1998 before disbanding in 2001.

In January 1997 they supported Radio Birdman at gigs in Gosford and Coogee Bay, I-94 Bar's reviewer, The Barman, noted "while they're tight and intense, it's hard to see why they bother having two guitarists when, for most of the night, they play the same thing. I want to like them but I can't help thinking Helmet do the same thing, only better". Their third album, Last of the V8 Interceptors, was released in August 1997, which was named for the protagonist's vehicle in the feature film, Mad Max 2 (1981). It had been recorded in April 1997 with Magoo (Regurgitator, Tu-plang) producing at Paradise Studios.

An ode to assisted suicide, "Pulse", from the album was issued as a single and became their signature tune. It received high rotation on national radio, including on Triple J. "Pulse" was listed at No. 72 on that network's Hottest 100 poll for the year. Two further singles from the album appeared in 1998, "Summer Hits" (February) and "4 Star Heritage Arsehole" (April). During the latter half of that year Campbell worked with a pop, rock group, Stella One Eleven; he was also a guest musician on Jimmy Little's adult contemporary album, Messenger (June 1999).

In 1999 Front End Loader recorded a cover version of Queen's "Crazy Little Thing Called Love" as a duet with Barry Crocker, which was issued as a single in July. It appeared on Timelines: The Intergenerational Music Project, a compilation album by various artists which paired young bands with artists over 60 to celebrate 1999 as the International Year of Older Persons. At the end of that year Kostic, while still a member of Front End Loader, joined Regurgitator to replace Martin Lee on drums.

=== 2001-2010: How Can We Fail When We're So Sincere? & Laughing with Knives ===
The band signed with Redline Records and in March 2002 released their fourth album, How Can We Fail When We're So Sincere?. Kostic joined another group, The Hard-Ons, on drums while continuing with Regurgitator and Front End Loader. In April the following year Front End Loader entered Troy Horse Studios, with Jonboyrock producing, to record, Ape Got Fire (August 2003), a seven-track EP.

In May 2004 the group's performance at Sydney's Annandale Hotel was recorded by Magoo, which was eventually released on 1 April 2008 as part of a live album, Laughing with Knives. It appeared on the Illustrious Artists label in a 2×CD format with 22 live tracks, a bonus 19-track disc of rarities, and an 8-page booklet with track-by-track liner notes.

=== 2011-2017: Ritardando & Fresh Six ===
On 6 May 2011 the band's fifth studio album, Ritardando, was issued on their own label, Weeping Anus Records. They followed with a national tour to promote the release. At the ARIA Music Awards of 2011 it won the Best Hard Rock/Heavy Metal Album category. The group had sent Triple J host and Frenzal Rhomb member, Lindsay McDougall, along to deliver an acceptance speech even though they felt a win was "highly improbable".

In the prepared speech, the band indicated they could not afford to attend, they thanked their fans and families; then they addressed the local music industry "as you were … please carry on … we mean you no harm. We will continue to write Rock Music that we enjoy, play shows when and where we can, and record and release this music as our time, money, and circumstances permit. None of these activities concern you so please, move along, and let us never speak of this again". The speech was not broadcast during the Nine Network's channel, Go!'s coverage of the ceremony.

On 14 July 2012 the group delivered another EP, the five-track Fresh Six, while promoting a collaborative beer of the same name made with Young Henrys Brewery. The beer was described by the company's owner as "tight and pretty punchy, and it should be strong obviously ... fairly bitter, and I know you guys are fond of tequila on stage so we should include some dark agave syrup in the beer". Campbell told theMusic.com.au website's Steve Bell "Making a beer for us was far more impressive than the ARIA".

=== 2018-present: Neutral Evil ===
In April 2018, the group released their sixth studio album, Neutral Evil.

== Discography ==
=== Studio albums ===
Title	Album details
Front End Loader	Released: June 1993; Label: Survival Records (SUR528)
Let's Ride!	Released: March 1995; Label: Shagpile Records / Shock Records (SHAGCD2026)
Last of the V8 Interceptors	Released: August 1997; Label: Shagpile Records / Shock Records (SHAGCD2038)
How Can We Fail When We're So Sincere?	Released: March 2002; Label: Shagpile Records / Shock Records (RED009)
Ritardando	Released: May 2011; Label: Weeping Anus Records (WA004)
Neutral Evil	Released: April 2018; Label: Weeping Anus Records (WA008)

=== Live albums ===
Title	Album details
Laughing With Knives	Released: 2008; Label: Illustrious Artists (IARLP203)

=== Extended plays ===
Title	EP details
Adolescent Fantasy World	Released: June 1994; Label: Shagpile Records (SHAGCD7008)
Ape Got Fire	Released: August 2003
Fresh Six	Released: July 2012; Label: Weeping Anus Records (WA005)

== Awards and nominations ==
=== AIR Awards ===
The Australian Independent Record Awards (commonly known informally as AIR Awards) is an annual awards night to recognise, promote and celebrate the success of Australia's Independent Music sector.

Year	Nominee / work	Award	Result
2011	Ritardando	Best Independent Hard Rock/Punk Album	Nominated

=== ARIA Music Awards ===
The ARIA Music Awards is an annual awards ceremony held by the Australian Recording Industry Association. They commenced in 1987.

Year	Nominee / work	Award	Result	Ref.
2011	Ritardando	Best Hard Rock or Heavy Metal Album	Won	
