= Glitoris =

Punk rock band from Australia

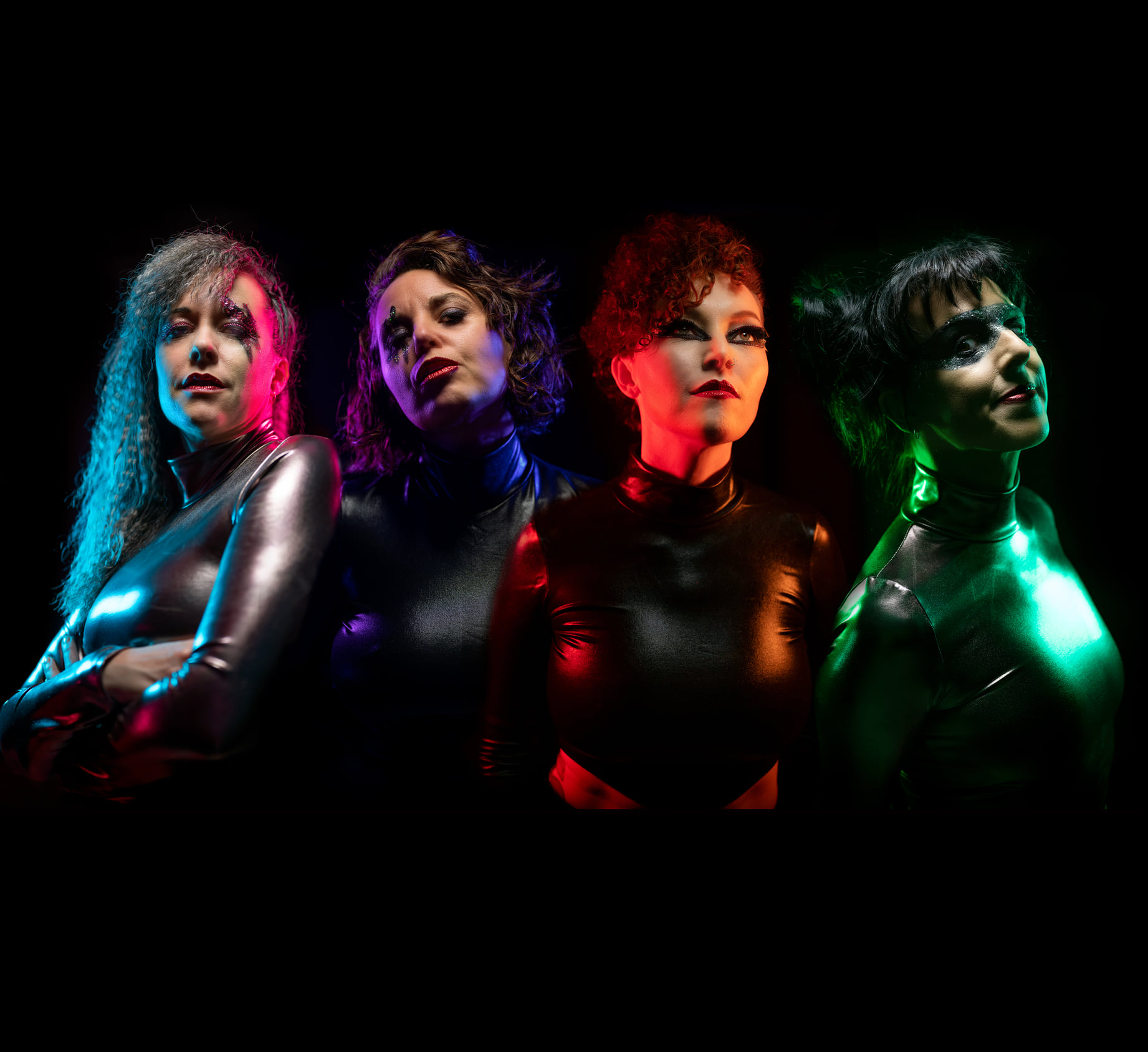
- Glitoris in 2022

Background information
- Origin: Canberra, Australia
- Genres: Punk rock
- Years active: 2014–present (on hiatus 2024–present)
- Label: Buttercup Records
- Members: Keven 007; Andrew; Malcolm; Mickey
- Past members: Bec Taylor (Tony); Sophie Chapman; Scott

Glitoris (a portmanteau of "glitter" and "clitoris") are a four-piece punk rock band from Canberra ACT, Australia. The band is composed of Keven 007 (vocals and guitar), Malcolm (bass), Mickey (drums) and Andrew (lead guitar).

Glitoris are known for their use of punk rock sounds and utilisation of humorous and political subject matter in their lyrics. The group occasionally incorporate multi-layered vocal harmonies into their sound and usually perform in vivid costumes and make up. Their fanbase are known as the Gliterati. The band are popular amongst the LGBTQI+ community and often speak out on matters of gender and sexual equality.

== History ==
=== 2014–2016: Formation and first EP ===
The band, initially comprising Tony (Drums), Sophie Chapman (Bass) and Keven 007 (vocals and guitar) began as a one-off protest band/gig in 2014 where they played in the local festival ‘You Are Here’ fully naked and covered in glitter.’ The show sold out and they decided to continue. In late 2014, they recruited Andrew on lead guitar.

In 2015, Glitoris recorded their 4-track debut ‘The Disgrace at Infidel Studios, Queanbeyan. Sophie left Glitoris in 2015 and the band recruited Malcolm on bass.

In September 2016, the band signed to Buttercup Records and released The Disgrace.

Later in 2016, the band headlined Art Not Apart's Sound and Fury show, were special guests on Regurgitator's Human Distribution tour and in December 2016, they won Best Live Act (ACT) at the National Live Music Awards of 2016.

=== 2017–2019: "Trump Card" and The Policy ===
On 20 January 2017, Glitoris released a single "Trump Card" in protest at the inauguration of President Donald Trump. The track featured Trump quotes from his campaign trail and was accompanied by a video depicting Glitoris performing the song in the studio. At the end of the video, the group sing in four-part harmony and are seen urinating on a picture of the president.

In 2017, Glitoris performed at Thrashville festival, shared bills with Frenzal Rhomb and Shonen Knife, as well as performing with Amanda Palmer at the National Carillon.

At the National Live Music Awards of 2017: Best Live Act (ACT), Best Live Voice (ACT) and Best Hard Rock Act (National).

In 2017, Andrew was endorsed by Vance Custom Guitars and Bareknuckle Pickups. A custom guitar designed for female players, The Glitterbomb SB, was released by the company following a six-month collaboration.

In January–March 2018, Glitoris recorded their debut album The Policy at The Pet Food Factory, Sydney, with Jason Whalley of punk band Frenzal Rhomb. The band headlined Psych Fest, following up with an 8-night residency at the New Zealand Fringe Festival in Wellington.

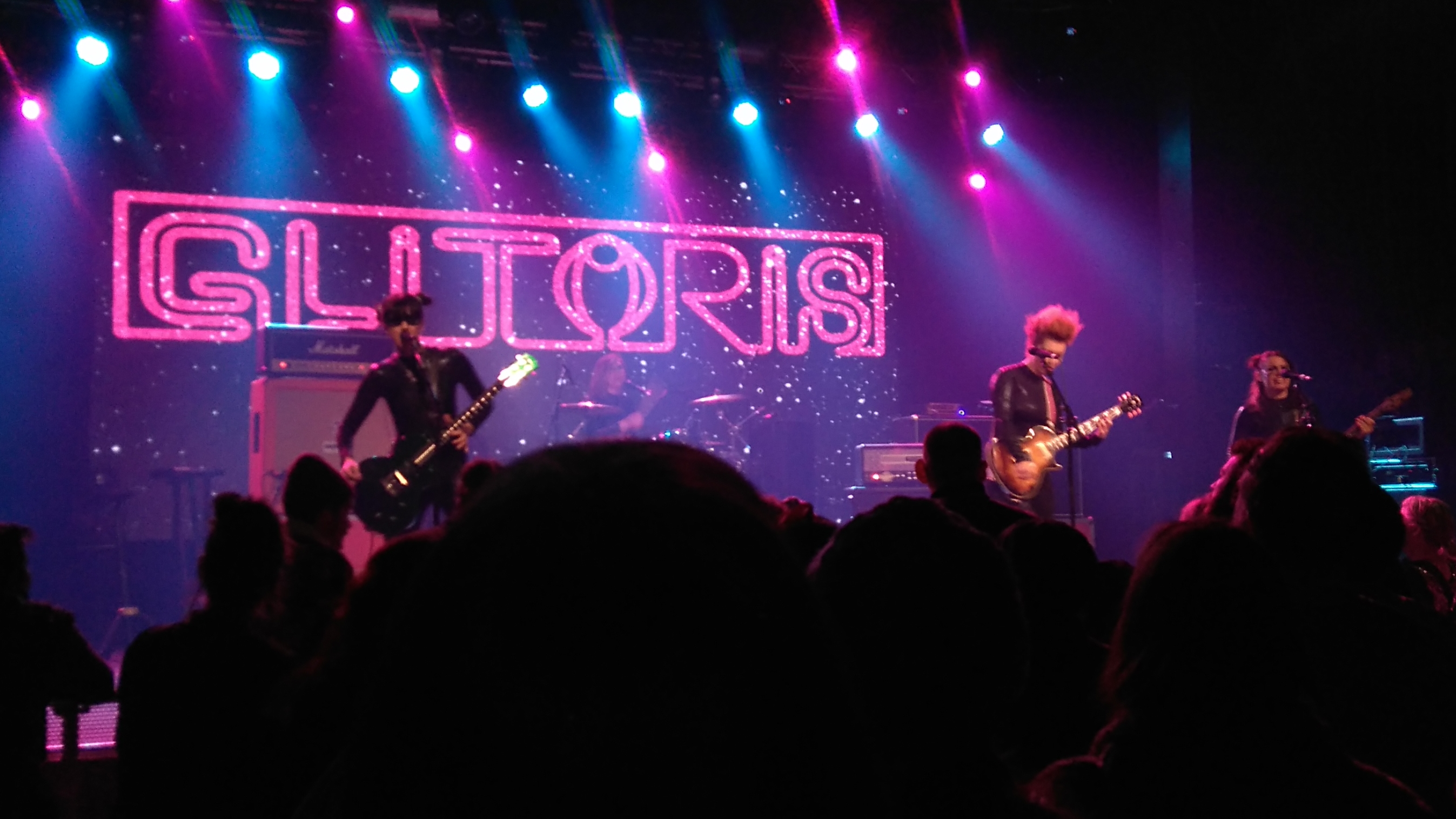
Glitoris performing live in Melbourne, Australia as part of Regurgitator's Life Support Tour (August 10, 2018)

In July 2018, Glitoris released the single "Spit Hood", a critique of failures in the youth criminal justice system and the over-representation of Aboriginal youth in detention. The track was based on footage shown in the ABC Four Corners documentary Australia's Shame.

In October 2018 the band released the title track from their debut album The Policy and announced an Australian tour. The Policy was released on 2 November 2018.

In December 2018, Tony announced her departure from the band and Glitoris recruited Scott "ScoMo" on drums.

The band returned in April 2019 to play a rousing set at Groovin' the Moo.

After a year of successful shows, at the National Live Music Awards of 2019, Glitoris won Hard Rock Live Act of the Year.

=== 2020: "Slut Power" ===
In February 2020, Glitoris released "Slut Power"- the fourth and final single from their debut album The Policy and announced a 17-date national tour. They performed 2 shows in the Northern Territory – one in Alice Springs and a sold out IWD show at the Railway Club in Darwin – before the rest of the tour was postponed due to COVID-19 pandemic. On Saturday the 13th of June 2020, Glitoris performed 2 socially distanced shows at The Basement in Canberra. A live mini-LP, The Slut Power Sessions – Live at The Basement, featuring recordings from the shows was released in October 2020. Scott left the band in December 2020. The band recruited Michael “Mickey” Glitoris on drums and performed at the Darwin Railway Club on New Year's Eve 2021.

2022-24: 2nd album

Towards the end of 2022, Glitoris did a series of live shows where they debuted material from their upcoming second album. The first single, "Lickety Split" was released just before they went on tour with Regurgitator. "Sock Puppet" was the second single, released not long before the album's release. The album showed the band broaden their musical spectrum even further, bringing in more prog, art rock, opera, classical, jazz, funk, hip hop, metal, world music and pop elements. In 2024, they celebrated 10 years of Glitoris. They announced that they were going to go on indefinite hiatus on that same post. Discography

=== Albums ===
Title	Details
The Policy	Released: 2 November 2018; Label: Buttercup Records (BUTT057); Formats: CD, LP, digital
Glitoris	Released: 14 July 2023; Label: Buttercup Records (BUTT064); Formats: CD, LP, digital

=== Extended plays ===
Title	Details
Disgrace	Released: 28 October 2016; Label: Buttercup Records (BUTT032); Formats: CD, LP, digital
The Slut Power Sessions – Live at The Basement	Released: 30 October 2020; Label: Buttercup Records (BUTT058); Formats: LP, digital

== Awards and nominations ==
=== AIR Awards ===
The Australian Independent Record Awards (commonly known informally as AIR Awards) is an annual awards night to recognise, promote and celebrate the success of Australia's Independent Music sector.

Year	Nominee / work	Award	Result	Ref.
2024	Glitoris	Best Independent Heavy Album or EP	Nominated	

=== National Live Music Awards ===
The National Live Music Awards (NLMAs) commenced in 2016 to recognise contributions to the live music industry in Australia.

Year	Nominee / work	Award	Result	Ref.
2016	themselves	ACT Live Act of the Year	Won	
2017	themselves	Live Hard Rock Act of the Year	Nominated	
2019	themselves	Live Hard Rock Act of the Year	Won	
2023	Andrew Glitoris (Glitoris)	Best Live Guitarist	Nominated	
2023	themselves	Best Hard Rock or Heavy Metal Act	Nominated	
2023	themselves	Best Live Act in the ACT	Nominated	
2023	Keven 007 (Glitoris)	Best Live Voice in the ACT	Nominated	
