= ! (The Song Formerly Known As) =

1998 song by Australian rock band Regurgitator

Single by Regurgitator

from the album Unit
- A-side: "Modern Life"
- B-side: "I Like Your Old Remix Better Than Your New Remix"
- Released: 13 September 1998
- Studio: The Dirty Room
- Length: 3:25
- Label: EastWest
- Songwriter: Quan Yeomans
- Producers: Magoo; Regurgitator

Regurgitator singles chronology
"Polyester Girl" (1998)	"! (The Song Formerly Known As)" / "Modern Life" (1998)	"Happiness (Rotting My Brain)" (1999)

Music video
- "! (The Song Formerly Known As)" on YouTube

"! (The Song Formerly Known As)" is a song by Australian rock band Regurgitator. The song was released as a double-A side single with "Modern Life" in September 1998 as the fourth and final single from the band's second studio album, Unit. The single peaked at number 28 in Australia and was ranked number six on Triple J's Hottest 100 in 1998, with B-side "I Like Your Old Remix Better Than Your New Remix" being ranked at number 27. In 2025, the song placed 67 on the Triple J Hottest 100 of Australian Songs. At the ARIA Music Awards of 1999, the song was nominated for three awards: Best Group, Best Video and Single of the Year.

== Critical reception ==
In 2014, Clem Bastow from The Guardian said "'!' is unmatched: it's a towering slab of electronic fuzz, tailor made for giant stadiums and the sort of raves that bring to mind The Matrix's Zion scenes, and yet the song is about staying home and listening to records in the living room with your significant other."

In 2015, the song was listed at number 60 in In the Mix's 100 Greatest Australian Dance Tracks of All Time with Nick Jarvis saying "The best track on the album (and arguably the best track the 'Gurge has written yet) – a dance track played by a live band about how dancing around your living room with bae wearing ugly pants is so much better than going out to loud, smoky clubs.".

In 2019, Tyler Jenke from The Brag ranked Regurgitator's best songs, with "!" coming it at number 1. Jenke said "Ask anyone from the era, and they'll all agree that '! (The Song Formerly Known As)' is Regurgitator's finest moment.. it managed to become their shining glory, with lyrics that describe just sitting back and avoiding clubs, raves, and concerts in favor of a comfy lounge room in suburbia." calling the song "an essential piece of Aussie music history."

Junkee said, "Even at their most ribald, they still sound like an out-of-control after-school care group going to town on a bunch of poor, unsuspecting instruments. '!' isn't even really a song. It's a work of punkish extravagance, dressed in nothing but a streak of yellow paint and with murder on its mind. "

== Music video ==
The music video for the song was filmed in Tokyo, with the band members being filmed in various locations throughout the city.

== Track listing ==
Australian CD single
No.	Title	Length
1.	"! (The Song Formerly Known As)"	3:29
2.	"Modern Life"	2:19
3.	"! (The Song Formerly Known As)" (Retrotech Adjustment)	3:30
4.	"I Like Your Old Remix Better Than Your New Remix" (a remix of "I Like Your Old Stuff Better Than Your New Stuff")	3:01

== Charts ==
Weekly chart performance for "! (The Song Formerly Known As)"
Chart (1998)	Peak position
Australia (ARIA)	28

== Release history ==
Release history and formats for "! (The Song Formerly Known As)"
Region	Date	Format	Label	Catalogue
Australia	13 September 1998	CD single	EastWest	3984249522
