= Band in a Bubble =

Television series

Band in a Bubble is a television series that consists of round-the-clock live broadcasting, during which a band spends an extended period of time inside a "bubble," writing and recording an album. The Band in a Bubble concept was created by Paul Curtis, a band manager, tour promoter, owner of Valve Records, and visual artist based in Australia. The concept was developed in conjunction with Australian rock band Regurgitator and XYZ Networks.

== Regurgitator – Melbourne (2004) ==
Curtis developed the idea in 1999 as an art-oriented recording project. It was conceptually stimulated by biospheres, the idiosyncratic way Regurgitator recorded albums, and by the idea of the insular artistic recording process, juxtaposed against the extroverted performer and how that might impact on the creative mindset. Curtis initially failed to convince Regurgitator of the merits of his idea, and it was set aside for a number of years. Quan Yeomans, the band's guitarist, noted that he became more open to the idea of being in a bubble after seeing David Blaine's magic stunt. Yeomans told The Age, "I happened to be there when David Blaine did his stunt over the Thames, and I just thought, 'wouldn't it be interesting if he was doing something creative, as opposed to just sitting around doing nothing?'"

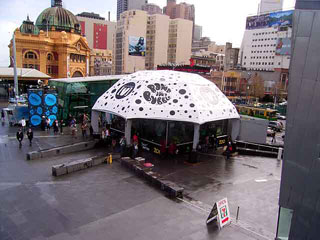
Regurgitator's Bubble at Federation Square

With the band's interest now confirmed, Curtis approached a number of television and media outlets, eventually finalising an agreement with Channel V Australia. The first Band in a Bubble was organised in Federation Square in Melbourne, Australia. Regurgitator holed up inside the glass bubble for a period of three weeks, during which they recorded the album Mish Mash!. The staging began on 31 August 2004.

The activity inside the bubble could be viewed in several ways. In person, people could watch through the bubble's walls. Cameras positioned inside the bubble offered footage that was displayed on several large LCD screens in Federation Square and broadcast on a dedicated 24-hour digital channel on the pay-TV networks Foxtel and Austar, on digital channel 802. Channel V also carried a daily half-hour highlight show, hosted by VJ Jabba. The first of its kind, The resulting Mish Mash! is considered to be the most witnessed album recording. After three weeks, the band emerged from the bubble and performed their new songs live to a large audience in Federation Square.

Yeomans' mother Lien, a popular Vietnamese cook and author, prepared food for the band during their stay. The food was delivered to the band through a hatch, which also served as a way for Curtis to communicate with them. An audio link-up was also located on the other side of the bubble so that visiting musicians and fans could talk to the band or record guest spots on the record.

Following the Melbourne event, the concept was licensed for development internationally by subsidiaries of Endemol, the television production company responsible for such shows as Big Brother and Deal or No Deal. Plans were soon announced for Band in a Bubble in the US and Europe.

In 2007, Regurgitator released a 2-disc DVD compiling 3.5 hours of Band In A Bubble footage. The second disc includes their live performance in Federation Square, two documentaries ("Hubbub" and "Once More Like That"), and music videos.

Greg Moskovitch from Tone Deaf summarised in 2016, in the days that Channel V was shut down, that "Band In A Bubble stands as arguably one of the most unique moments in Australian music, the relic of a time when Channel V was a cultural force and the idea of musicians broadcasting their every thought and move was something of a novelty".

== Cartel – New York City (2007) ==
Endemol's first staging of Band in the Bubble took place in New York City and featured the pop-punk band Cartel. The show was developed in a partnership with MTV, Dr Pepper, and the band's label, Epic Records. The show was launched on 24 May 2007.

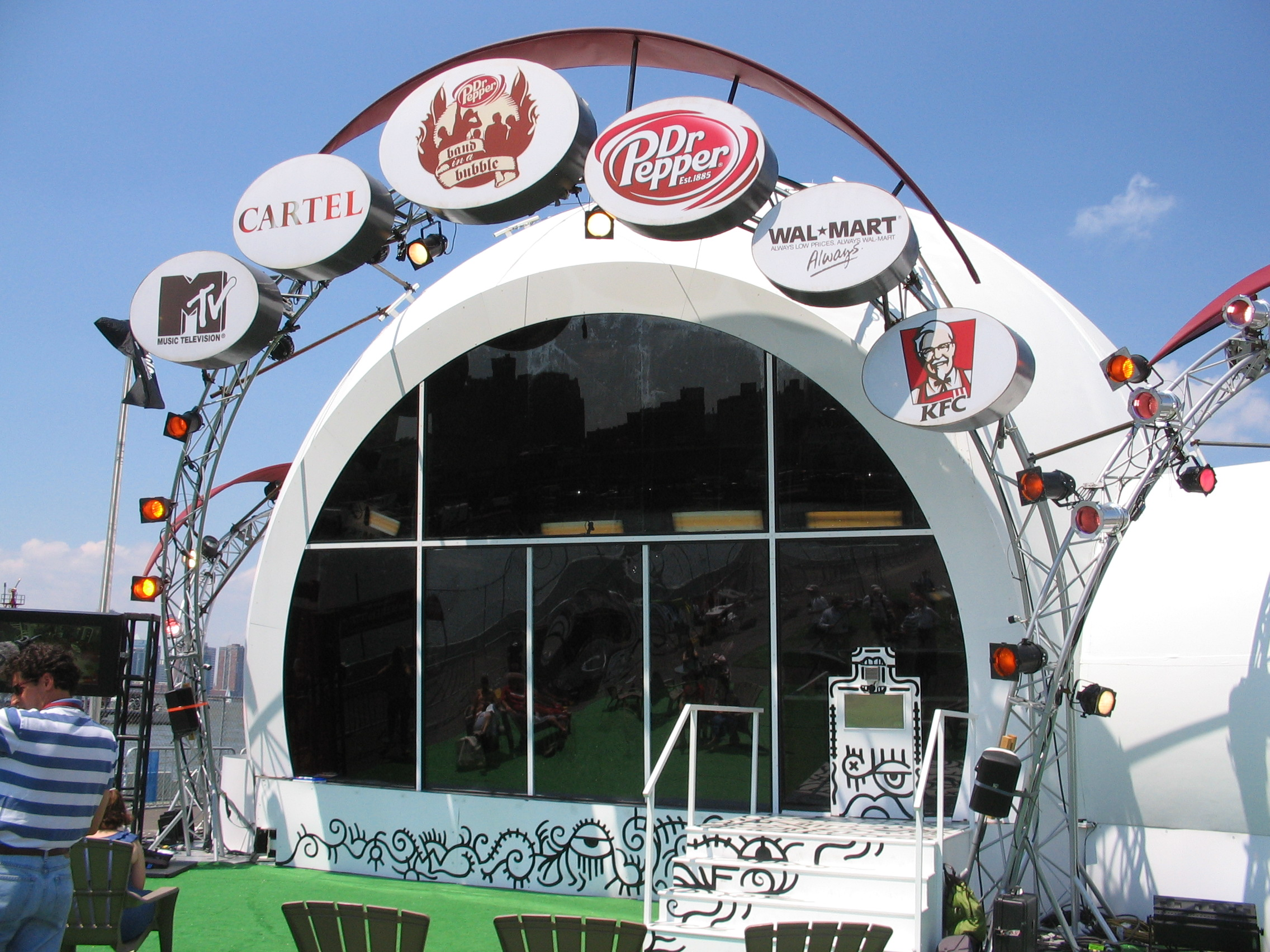
Cartel's at Pier 54

The bubble was set up at Hudson River Park's Pier 54. As before, fans were able to stop by the bubble and watch the band through the building's windows. 23 webcams were set up around the bubble and could be viewed via MTV.com and drpepperbubble.com. MTV broadcast four half-hour specials. During the series, the group Cartel recorded their self-titled album Cartel, the follow-up to their 2005 debut album Chroma.

The bubble was created using 55,000 pounds (24,948 kg) of steel truss and quarter-inch-thick fireproof rigid fiberglass. The bubble contained a 2,000-square-foot (190 m^{2}) recording studio as well as a kitchen, dining room, lounge area, and bathroom. The band's sleeping area was on the top level, which was held nine feet (2.74 m) in the air by airplane hangar cables.

On 3 June 2007, Cartel's front window was broken by striking winds coming from Pier 54, exactly ten days after they had first entered the bubble.

The staging concluded on 12 June, when the band exited the bubble and performed the new album live.
