= Regurgitator =

Australian rock band

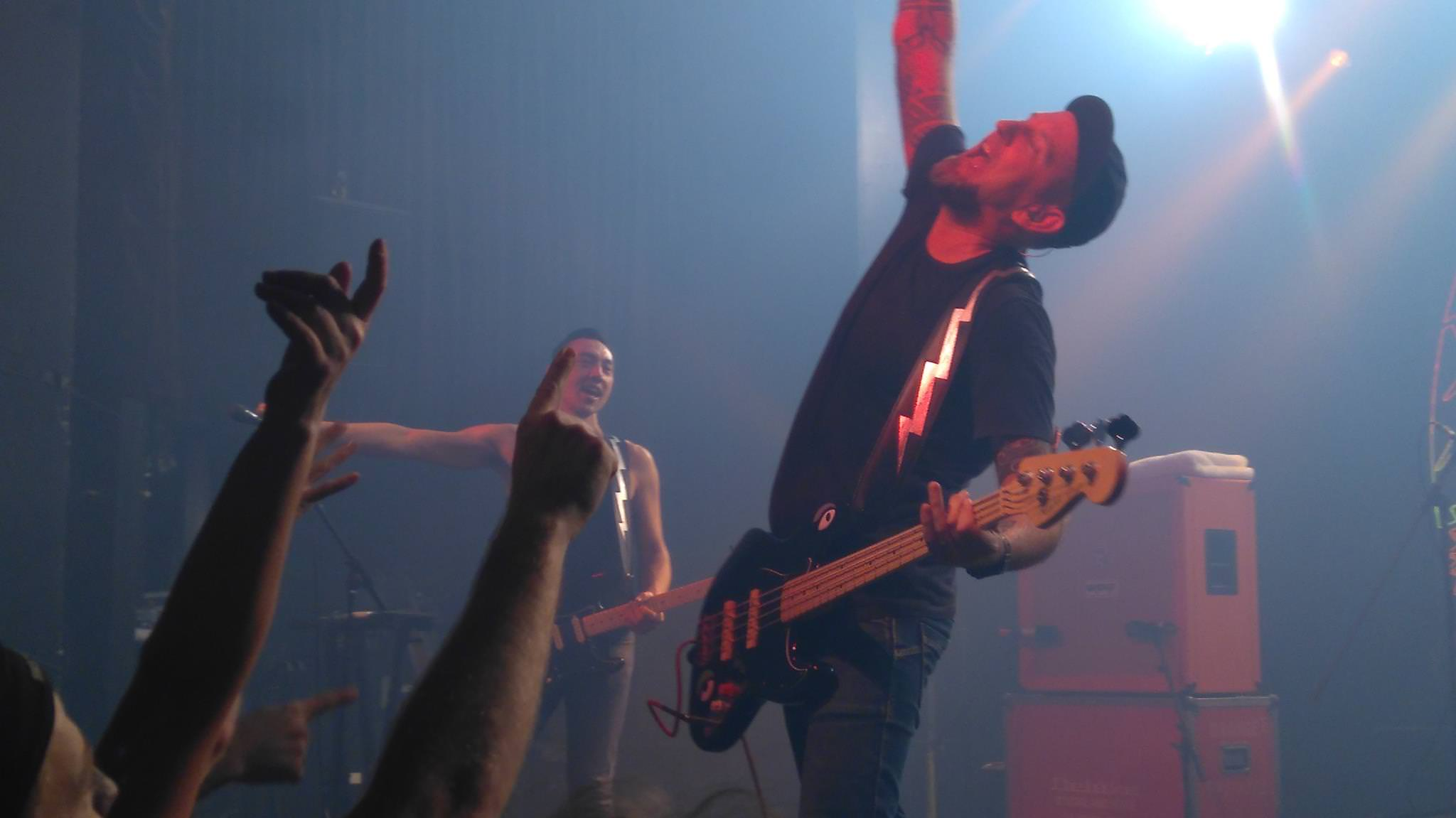
- Regurgitator (left to right) Quan Yeomans and Ben Ely performing live, 10 August 2018

Background information
- Origin: Brisbane, Queensland, Australia
- Genres: Alternative rock; electronica; electropop; pop rock; alternative hip hop; rap rock
- Years active: 1993–present (hiatus 2013–2015)
- Labels: Warner; Valve; Reprise/Warner Bros.; ABC Music
- Members: Ben Ely; Quan Yeomans; Peter Kostic
- Past members: Martin Lee; Shane Rudken; Seja Vogel
- Website: regurgitator.net

Regurgitator are an Australian alternative rock band from Brisbane, Queensland, formed in late 1993 by Quan Yeomans on lead vocals, guitar and keyboards; Ben Ely on bass guitar, keyboards and vocals; and Martin Lee on drums. Their debut studio album, Tu-Plang was released in May 1996; it was followed by Unit in November 1997 which was certified triple platinum. Unit won five categories at the ARIA Music Awards of 1998: Album of the Year, Best Alternative Album, Producer of the Year (for Magoo), Engineer of the Year (Magoo) and Best Cover Art (for The Shits). Their third album, ...Art was released in August 1999.

Regurgitator had two singles reach the top 20 with "Polyester Girl" (May 1998) peaking at No. 14 in Australia and No. 16 in New Zealand; while "Happiness (Rotting My Brain)" (July 1999) also appeared at No. 16 in New Zealand. Martin Lee left Regurgitator in late 1999 and was replaced by Peter Kostic on drums, who was simultaneously a member of Front End Loader (1991–present) and the Hard-Ons (2002–2011). Casual members have included Seja Vogel, from Sekiden; Shane Rudken (Ponyloaf); Dave Atkins (Pangaea, Resin Dogs) among others. Regurgitator's fourth studio album, Eduardo and Rodriguez Wage War on T-Wrecks was released in July 2001 and was their final studio album for Warner before mutually agreeing to terminate their recording agreement. They then went on to issue four more independent studio albums—Mish Mash! recorded as part of the multimedia reality show parody Band in a Bubble; Love and Paranoia recorded in Rio de Janeiro on Corcovado after licensing the Band in a Bubble project to a US version staged in New York City; Super Happy Fun Times Friends recorded over three weeks in their home studio; and Dirty Pop Fantasy recorded in a Hong Kong apartment before announcing an extended hiatus in December 2013. They commenced playing shows again in mid-2015. Recording at 'Greg's Byron Bay & Wild Mountain Sound resulted in ninth album Headroxx released in 2018. In 2022 work began on new music which came to be Invader released April 2024.

The group's spin-off project Regurgitator's Pogogo Show released their debut album of children's music in 2019.

== History ==
=== 1993–1995: Early years ===
Regurgitator was originally a 3-piece indie rock band with Quan Yeomans (guitar and vocals), Ben Ely (bass and vocals) and Martin Lee (drums). The three had purportedly met on a bus in inner Brisbane. At this time, all three were already in several bands - Pangaea, Zooerastia, Precision Oiler, Brazilia among others. Regurgitator at this time was not considered to be the main focus of any members, rather as a side-project to their other bands.

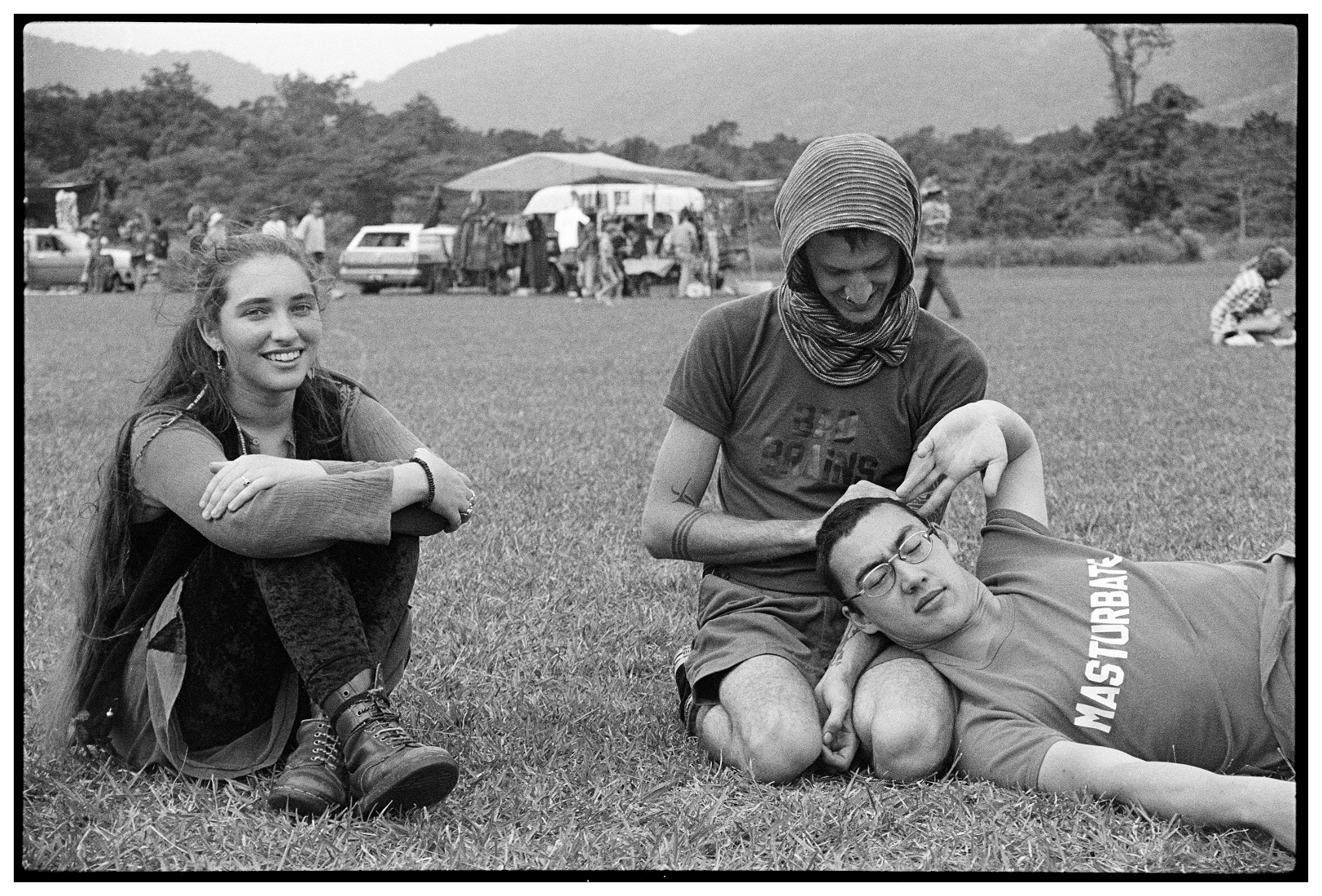
Ely and Yeomans (middle and right), prior to the band's performance at the Cow Bay Festival in 1995.

The band released its debut self-titled EP in October 1994. With the emergence of Brisbane's underground music scene in the early 1990s, major labels, such as Warner Music Group, took the initiative to expand its Australian music roster. A&R representative Michael Parisi initially pursued Pangaea, a popular and established band in Brisbane's underground that Ben Ely fronted. It wasn't until Parisi was supplied with Pangaea recordings by their manager Paul Curtis that he discovered Regurgitator, whose material was also presented as part of a potential Valve label P&D deal. Ironically, Parisi would push for the less-established band to be signed because "it was the hook that Pangaea, for all the excitement [it] had generated on stage, had lacked."

The band signed with Warner early in 1995, who re-released its debut EP in February 1995, which charted at number 45 on the ARIA singles chart. Regurgitator quickly released another EP, titled New, which featured radio hits "Track 1" and "Blubber Boy". New peaked at number 30 on the ARIA singles chart.

=== 1996: Tu-Plang ===
Following the success of their first two EPs, the band made an unusual move by travelling to Thailand to record their first full-length album. Made on a comparatively small budget at a famed pop studio in Bangkok, Tu-Plang (ตู้เพลง; Thai for 'Jukebox'), largely featured a mixture of rock and hip hop, which was particularly evident on its third single release "Kong Foo Sing". The band also experimented in a number of genres including techno, musak, surf rock and dub. Yeomans gained notoriety for his uniquely cynical and obscene lyrical style, most notably the controversial pop-rock tune "I Sucked a Lot of Cock to Get Where I Am", which was attacked by Australian radio identity Alan Jones, who campaigned to have it removed from airplay. Tu-Plang peaked at number 3 on the ARIA Charts, was certified platinum and won Best Alternative Release and Breakthrough Artist at the ARIA Music Awards of 1996.

=== 1997–1998: Unit ===
The band recorded their second studio album in a warehouse in Brisbane which they affectionately named "The Dirty Room". In contrast with their rock-oriented works of the past, the band moved on with a more electronic and pop based sound. The band openly acknowledged their stylistic change with the album's opening track, ironically titled "I Like Your Old Stuff Better Than Your New Stuff". The band released "Everyday Formula" as the first single, with Yeomans and Magoo later admitting it was a conscious decision to ease their fans into the new sound with a heavier track. The single release in October 1997 peaked at number 41 on the ARIA Charts. Unit was released in November and peaked at number 4 on the ARIA Charts. "Black Bugs", "Polyester Girl" and "! (The Song Formerly Known As)" (an homage to 1980s era Prince) were all released as singles and gained significant amounts of airplay. Unit is Regurgitator's most commercially successful album, going platinum three times in Australia. Whilst it no doubt increased the popularity of the band, fans of their first generation of work are still divided in their responses to it.

During the Unit tour in late 1997 drummer Martin Lee had failed to appear at a show at the University of Western Australia. After disappearing from a Perth nightclub, he was found the next day, unconscious, and was taken to hospital where he remained comatose for a week. No-one, including Lee once he had recovered, had any recollection of the circumstances that had landed him there. Jon Coghill of Brisbane rock band Powderfinger was his fill-in for the rest of the tour, though the arrangement purportedly caused a rift between the two bands as Coghill and Lee were high school friends and, as Yeomans explained in a 2011 interview, "...those guys (Powderfinger) are kind of from a different scene I guess, if you like. Almost a different social strata in a weird way; they're all private school boys so we never had that much in common".

At the ARIA Music Awards of 1998, Unit won 5 Awards, including Album of the Year and Producer of the Year.

=== 1999–2000: ...art and Martin Lee's departure ===
After a short break in 1998 working with respective side projects (Quan formed Happyland with Spiderbait's Janet English and Ben Ely revived Pangaea) the band moved into Wategoes Beachhouse at Byron Bay on the New South Wales coast to begin recording their third album, ...art, which was released in August 1999 and peaked at number 2 on the ARIA Chart. Having rebuilt "The Dirty Room" studio with the assumption it would be used for the recording, Lee felt undervalued when Yeomans made it clear he needed a change in working environment. Ely admitted that tension had always existed between the two. Since the Unit sessions he had felt excluded from the creative process as his material would rarely be used and he was often replaced by a drum machine in the studio. After an extended absence during the album recording and a string of absences on the supporting tour schedule it was announced in late 1999 that Lee would be leaving the group due to 'creative differences'. He formed The Boat Show with Matthew Strong of Custard when Custard disbanded. Lee was replaced by Front End Loader and Hard-Ons drummer, Peter Kostic in late 1999.

=== 2001–2003: Eduardo and Rodriguez Wage War on T-Wrecks and Jingles ===
The band's fourth album, Eduardo and Rodriguez Wage War on T-Wrecks was released in July 2001; a hip-hop-focused album that Yeomans and Ely recorded and produced in London. At this time, a turbulent relationship commenced with the Warner label who were unable to grasp the band's lack of motivation and refusal to compromise for the sake of commercial success. After the fourth album, discussions led to a mutual request to end the deal, and the compilation album Jingles was released.

=== 2004–2005: Band in a Bubble and Mish Mash! and #?*! ===
In 2004, Regurgitator created and participated in the Band in a Bubble project; a new reality TV-inspired media stunt sponsored and broadcast by Australian music channel, Channel V. The band entered a small glass recording studio, built in Federation Square in the centre of Melbourne, to record their new album; their first on new label Valve Records. Pedestrians could look into most rooms of the "bubble" and could watch the band work, or tune into a 24-hour digital cable television channel and watch their work on that. Nobody could enter or leave the bubble, a la Big Brother. In addition to the three band members, their longtime Australian producer Magoo, engineer Hugh Webb and Channel V host Jabba were all also locked into the bubble with the band.

The first single from the session was released in October 2004 as "The Drop" and the album, Mish Mash! was released in November 2004 and it peaked at number 52 on the ARIA Charts.

In August 2005, the band released the #?*! (or Pillowhead) EP which contained B-sides from Mish Mash!.

=== 2006: Break ===
Regurgitator took a break in 2006, during which time Ely began working on his project Jump 2 Light Speed and Yeomans worked on establishing a solo career. The band also licensed their Band in a Bubble concept to Initial TV in the UK. In 2007, Yeomans released an EP with Sydney-based musician Spod called Blox.

=== 2007–2010: Love and Paranoia and Distractions ===
In 2007, the band reunited and recorded their sixth album in Rio de Janeiro, Brazil. Love and Paranoia was released in Australia on 15 September 2007 and peaked at number 74. It features 80s style keyboard-driven poprock tunes, with new member Seja Vogel on keyboards. Two singles were released from the album, "Blood and Spunk" and "Romance of the Damned".

In 2008, Regurgitator supported the album with a tour of UK and Asia. It was the first time in 5 years that the band had toured the UK. Simultaneously, Ben Ely and Quan Yeomans both launched solo projects with "Ben Ely's Radio 5" becoming his second solo project while Yeomans's album Quan: The Amateur was his debut solo album which was recorded in Hong Kong.

At the beginning of May 2010, Regurgitator announced on the news section of their website that they had begun work on new music and would release music 'as they go along' instead of an album. In August 2010, the band released the single "Making No Sense" and in September, a four-track EP titled Distractions. In December 2010, the band released another single titled, "Nrob Bmud".

=== 2011–2013: Super Happy Fun Times Friends and Dirty Pop Fantasy ===
In July 2011, the band released "One Day", the lead single from their seventh studio album Super Happy Fun Times Friends in August 2011. The album debuted on the AIR chart at No. 18 and the ARIA chart at No. 91.

In June 2012, it was announced that Regurgitator would be playing their first two albums, Tu Plang and Unit, in their entirety in an Australian tour named RetroTech.

In early 2013, the band announced that they were working on their eighth studio album in Hong Kong. Entitled Dirty Pop Fantasy, the album was released on 6 September 2013 through Valve Records. The album was streamed online on 23 August 2013 on the Deezer website. During the band's keynote address at the Big Sound music conference in early September 2013, the band explained that the lower level of productivity during the latter part of their career is due to the geographical spread of the two primary band members, Ely and Yeomans—Ely is based in Melbourne, Australia, while Yeomans resides in Hong Kong. A post on the band's Facebook page on 18 September 2013 then revealed that Regurgitator will enter a period of indefinite hiatus following a national Australian and Asian tour that ended in December 2013 due to the birth of Yeomans's first child. Their last show for the foreseeable future was in Beijing on 7 December 2013 as part of the Converse Rubber Tracks event with touring friends Chinese band New Pants.

=== 2014–2018: Hiatus and HEADROXX ===
In May 2015, following an 18 month hiatus commencing in September 2013, Regurgitator announced their Cheap Imitations tour-ché across Australia from August to September 2015.

In April 2016, they performed at the National Gallery of Victoria covering Velvet Underground's debut album, The Velvet Underground and Nico as part of the Andy Warhol-Ai Weiwei exhibition. Regurgitator's line-up was Yeomans, Ely, Kostic and joined by Seja Vogel on keyboards/vocals and Mindy Meng Wang on guzheng. In homage to Prince, they added a cover of his song, "When Doves Cry" to their set list on 22 April.

In October 2017, Regurgitator performed a special one-off show at the Gold Coast Convention and Exhibition Centre as a part of EB Games Expo, celebrating the 20th anniversary of their 1997 album Unit. The concert was also filmed and was later released on DVD in 2019.

2018 saw the release of the band's 9th studio album, Headroxx.

=== 2019-2023: Regurgitator's Pogogo Show, Quarter Pounder and Touring ===
In 2019, the group announced their new children's music spin-off project Regurgitator's Pogogo Show. Their debut offering, The Really Really Really Really Boring Album was released on 1 March 2019. At the ARIA Music Awards of 2019, The Really Really Really Really Boring Album was nominated for Best Children's Album.

In October 2019, the group released a best of album titled Quarter Pounder: 25 Years of Being Consumed, alongside a national tour. In May 2023, Regurgitator toured around Australia for 25 years of Unit, with Custard, DZ Deathrays, Butterfingers & Glitoris. In October of that same year, they opened for Weezer for their two headlining Australian shows in early October 2023. The two bands also supported Kiss at their last Australian concert at Accor Stadium in Sydney.

=== 2024–present: Invader ===
In 2024, Regurgitator announced their 11th studio album Invader. Soon after the album's release, Sarah Lim joined the band as a touring musician, playing keytar, guitar and bass, and first joined them during the It's So Invasive Tour. The tour, which started in Hobart, Tasmania, and ended in Cairns, Queensland, saw Regurgitator playing 23 dates across Australia. Support acts during the tour included Party Dozen, the Subculture Clique, Displeasure, Cry Club, Wolfpack, Monster Zoku Onsomb!, and Dubbzone.

In August 2025, Regurgitator announced a retrospective singles tour named Jukeboxxin', which launched in Darwin on the 14th of November. While the initial leg of the tour, which took place across November and December 2025, was restricted to Victoria and New South Wales, the band announced a further 31 shows in October 2025. Stretching from February to May 2026, the second leg of the tour included dates in each state and territory of Australia, as well as New Zealand. Hip hop group DEM MOB supported them for the majority of the shows, with Ratsalad and Lost Quokka playing in WA. They are also set to play five shows in New Zealand in May 2026, supported by CINDY.

== Members ==
Current members

- Quan Yeomans – vocals, guitar, keyboards (1994–present)
- Ben Ely – vocals, bass, keyboards (1994–present)
- Peter Kostic – drums (1999–present)

Current touring musicians

- Sarah Lim – keytar, guitar, bass (2024-present)

Former members

- Martin Lee – drums (1994–1999)
- Seja Vogel – keyboards, backing vocals (2007–2010)

Former touring musicians

- Jon Coghill – drums (1997–1998; substitute for Martin Lee)
- Shane Rudken – keytar (1998–2006, 2023)

Guest musicians

- Tylea – backing vocals on "Feels Alright" and "I Love Tommy Mottola"
- Kram – additional drums on "Strange Human Being" and "I Love Tommy Mottola"
- Shane Rudken – additional keyboards on "Strange Human Being"
- Cameron Potts – drums on Distractions

== Discography ==
- Tu-Plang (1996)
- Unit (1997)
- ...art (1999)
- Eduardo and Rodriguez Wage War on T-Wrecks (2001)
- Mish Mash! (2004)
- Love and Paranoia (2007)
- Super Happy Fun Times Friends (2011)
- Dirty Pop Fantasy (2013)
- Headroxx (2018)
- The Really Really Really Really Boring Album
  (as Regurgitator's Pogogo Show) (2019)
- Invader (2024)

== Awards and nomination ==
=== AIR Awards ===
The Australian Independent Record Awards (commonly known informally as AIR Awards) is an annual awards night to recognise, promote and celebrate the success of Australia's Independent Music sector. They commenced in 2006.

Year	Nominee / work	Award	Result
2020	The Really Really Really Really Boring Album	Best Independent Children's Album or EP	Won
2025	Regurgitator	Best Independent Punk Album or EP	Nominated

=== ARIA Music Awards ===
The ARIA Music Awards are annual awards, which recognises excellence, innovation, and achievement across all genres of Australian music. Regurgitator have won 7 awards from 23 nominations.

Year	Nominee / work	Award	Result
1995	Regurgitator	Best Alternative Release	Nominated
1996	Tu-Plang	Album of the Year	Nominated
1996	Tu-Plang	Best Group	Nominated
1996	Tu-Plang	Breakthrough Artist - Album	Won
1996	Tu-Plang	Best Alternative Release	Won
1996	Magoo and Regurgitator for Tu-Plang	Producer of the Year	Nominated
1996	Magoo for Tu-Plang	Engineer of the Year	Nominated
1996	New (Note: ARIA lists Regurgitator's highest selling single as "New Detention". Regurgitator's highest placing on the singles chart for 1995/96 was for their extended play, New. They have not released a single called "New Detention".)	Highest Selling Single	Nominated
1996	Rockin' Doodles, Quan Yeomans and Ben Ely for Tu-Plang	Best Cover Art	Nominated
1998	Unit	Album of the Year	Won
1998	Unit	Best Group	Nominated
1998	Unit	Best Alternative Release	Won
1998	Jeremy Hydnes, George Pinn for "Polyester Girl"	Best Video	Nominated
1998	Quan Yeomans for "Black Bugs"	Best Video	Nominated
1998	Magoo and Regurgitator for Unit	Producer of the Year	Won
1998	Magoo for Unit	Engineer of the Year	Won
1998	The Shits (Note: The Shits were a duo renamed as Happyland consisting of (then) domestic partners Quan Yeomans of Regurgitator and Janet English of Spiderbait.) for Unit	Best Cover Art	Won
1999	Unit	Highest Selling Album	Nominated
1999	"! (The Song Formerly Known As)"	Single of the Year	Nominated
1999	"! (The Song Formerly Known As)"	Best Group	Nominated
1999	Tony McGrath for "! (The Song Formerly Known As)"	Best Video	Nominated
2000	Paul Butler, Scott Walton for "Happiness (Rotting My Brain)"	Best Video	Nominated
2019	The Really Really Really Really Boring Album	Best Children's Album	Nominated

=== Helpmann Awards ===
The Helpmann Awards is an awards show, celebrating live entertainment and performing arts in Australia, presented by industry group Live Performance Australia since 2001. Note: 2020 and 2021 were cancelled due to the COVID-19 pandemic.

Year	Nominee / work	Award	Result	Ref.
2011	Regurgitator and Sydney Opera House - Akira	Best Australian Contemporary Concert	Nominated	
2011	Regurgitator and Sydney Opera House - Akira	Best Original Score	Nominated	
