= Pangaea (band) =

Australian band

- Origin: Brisbane, Queensland, Australia
- Genres: Punk metal
- Years active: 1991–present
- Labels: Valve; EastWest
- Members: Dave Atkins; Paul Bromley; Ben Ely; Jim Sinclair

Pangaea is an Australian punk and metal band from Brisbane. They were formed by Ben Ely, Dave Atkins and Jim Sinclair. Sinclair left due to Ely's involvement with Regurgitator and was replaced by Paul Bromley. They released their debut album Friebentos (with other titles) in 1997. The 23 track album took five years to make. The original lineup reformed in 2011.

== Members ==
- Dave Atkins (Resin Dogs, Wolfmother) – drums
- Paul Bromley (George) – guitar
- Ben Ely (Regurgitator, Broken Head, The Stalkers, Jump 2 Light Speed) – vocals, bass guitar
- Jim Sinclair – guitar

== Discography ==
=== Albums ===
List of albums, with selected details and chart positions
Title	Details	Peak chart positions
Title	Details	AUS
Freibentos	Released: July 1997; Label: Valve, EastWest; Format: CD	44

=== Extended plays ===
List of EPs, with selected details
Title	Details
Serpent Fire	Released: 1993; Label: Valve; Format: CD
Raggacore	Released: 1994; Label: Valve; Format: CD

=== Singles ===
List of singles, with selected chart positions
Title	Year	Peak chart positions	Album
Title	Year	AUS	Album
"Smile"	1997	83	Freibentos
"Boys"	1997	98	Freibentos
