= Kiley Gaffney =

Australian artist

- Employer: Queensland University of Technology
- Musical career
- Born: Kiley Joy Gaffney; 1970 (age 55–56)
- Origin: Brisbane, Queensland, Australia
- Genres: Rock
- Occupations: Musician; performance artist
- Label: Warner

Kiley Joy Gaffney is an Australian rock musician and performance artist. Before signing to Warner (WEA) in 1995, she worked in theatre (acting and singing) and the art world (performance).

She released two albums with Warner, Bitter Fluff (August 1997) and Sweet Meat(early 2001), writing and playing most of the instruments on the former and writing, producing and playing everything on the latter.

Outspoken and ardently political, Gaffney completed a PhD and then worked as an academic at Queensland University of Technology.

== Personal life ==
Gaffney has lived with Paul Curtis, a talent manager, since 1994 – the couple were introduced by Regurgitator's Quan Yeomans, her label mate and managed by Curtis. Gaffney and Curtis have two children.

== Publications ==
- Gaffney, Kiley (2009). "Review: Culture and Power: A History of Cultural StudiesGibsonMark, Culture and Power: A History of Cultural Studies, University of New South Wales Press, Sydney, 2007, ISBN 9 7808 6840 8866, xi+228 pp., A$39.95". Media International Australia. 131 (1). SAGE Publications: 165–166. doi:10.1177/1329878x0913100120. ISSN 1329-878X. S2CID 149481128.

== Discography ==
=== Albums ===
- Bitter Fluff (August 1997)
- Sweet Meat(early 2001)

=== Extended plays ===
- Punk Rok Chik (1996)

=== Singles ===
- "Postman" (1996)
