= Cry Club =

Australian pop-punk band

- Origin: Melbourne, Victoria, Australia
- Genres: Pop-punk; indie pop
- Years active: 2018–present
- Labels: Best & Fairest
- Members: Heather Riley, Jono Tooke

Cry Club is a queer pop-punk duo from Melbourne, Australia, who formed as a group in 2018. They released their debut album God I'm Such a Mess in November 2020. Their second album Spite Will Save Me, was released on June 23, 2023.

== Biography ==
The duo was formed in Wollongong in 2018, when vocalist Heather Riley wanted to form a Siouxsie and the Banshees/The Cure cover band. Riley had known Jono Tooke since 2014, when they met during a university-organised trip to Japan and bonded over the animated series Over the Garden Wall.

The band's debut single, released in 2018, was a response to the 2017 same-sex marriage plebiscite in Australia, inspired by conversations with relatives who accepted and loved them as family members, but were adamantly voting against same-sex marriage. The group's follow-up single "DFTM", a song about people not respecting physical boundaries at concerts, was added to full rotation at Triple J in April 2019, and the duo became the most played act on Triple J Unearthed in 2019. The band relocated to Melbourne, and in 2019 released their debut extended play Sad, But Make It Fashion.

The duo released their debut album God I'm Such a Mess in November 2020. The album was nominated for Best Independent Punk Album or EP at the AIR Awards of 2021, and the band was nominated for best breakthrough act at the 2021 Music Victoria Awards.

Cry Club's second studio album Spite Will Save Me is scheduled for release in June 2023. In an album review, Ellie Robinson from NME said "It's brash, dramatic and camp, but also beautiful and empowering."

== Personal lives ==
The members of the band identify as queer. Riley is non-binary, and uses they/them pronouns.

== Discography ==
=== Studio albums ===
Title	Album details
God I'm Such a Mess	Released: 13 November 2020; Label: Best & Fairest; Format: LP, digital download, streaming
Spite Will Save Me	Released: 23 June 2023; Label: Cry Club; Format: LP, digital download, streaming
High Voltage Anxiety	Scheduled: 27 March 2026; Label: Cry Club; Format: LP, digital download, streaming

=== Extended plays ===
Title	Album details
Sad, But Make It Fashion	Released: 11 October 2019; Label: Best & Fairest; Format: Digital download, streaming

=== Singles ===
Title	Year	Album
"Walk Away"	2018	Sad, But Make It Fashion
"DFTM"	2019	Sad, But Make It Fashion
"Two Hearts"	2019	Sad, But Make It Fashion
"Robert Smith"	2019	Sad, But Make It Fashion
"Obvious"	2020	God I'm Such a Mess
"Nine of Swords"	2020	God I'm Such a Mess
"Lighters"	2020	God I'm Such a Mess
"Dissolve"	2020	God I'm Such a Mess
"People Like Me"	2022	Spite Will Save Me
"Somehow (You Still Get to Me)"	2022	Spite Will Save Me
"I Want More"	2023	Spite Will Save Me
"Hocus Pocus"	2023	Spite Will Save Me
"Cry About It"	2023	Spite Will Save Me
"Bad Taste"	2023	Spite Will Save Me
"High Voltage Anxiety"	2024	High Voltage Anxiety
"For Your Health"	2025	High Voltage Anxiety
"This, Forever"	2025	High Voltage Anxiety
"Retaliate"	2025	High Voltage Anxiety

== Awards and nominations ==
=== AIR Awards ===
The Australian Independent Record Awards (commonly known informally as AIR Awards) is an annual awards night to recognise, promote and celebrate the success of Australia's Independent Music sector.

Year	Nominee / work	Award	Result	Ref.
2021	God I'm Such a Mess	Best Independent Punk Album or EP	Nominated	

=== Music Victoria Awards ===
The Music Victoria Awards, are an annual awards night celebrating Victorian music. They commenced in 2005.

Year	Nominee / work	Award	Result	Ref.
2021	Cry Club	Best Breakthrough Act	Nominated	
