= The Tivoli =

Theatre, music venue and event space in Brisbane, Australia

The Tivoli Brisbane
- Interactive map of The Tivoli Brisbane
- Location: 52 Costin Street; Fortitude Valley QLD 4006
- Coordinates: 27.45224°S 153.0315°E
- Seating type: Standing/seated
- Capacity: standing: 1,560
- Type: Theatre

Construction
- Built: 1917

The Tivoli is an indoor theatre, music venue and event space located in Brisbane, Australia, with a standing capacity of 1,560. It has been known as the Tivoli Restaurant and Theatre as well as the Tivoli Theatre, and is now nicknamed The Tiv.

In 2016, the venue was purchased by brothers Steve Sleswick and Dave Sleswick after being earmarked for development.

== History ==
The Tivoli Theatre was originally built as Adams Bakery in 1917 and boasted having the finest gourmet cakes in Queensland. It was later used by the State Library of Queensland to store rare books, but with Expo 88 in the city, a new owner, Ann Garms, transformed it into The Tivoli Restaurant and Theatre - modeled on the Paradis Latin in Paris (1803), one of France's most famous cabaret theatres.

In August 1989, the venue opened with Putting on the Ritz, a show celebrating the Golden Age of Hollywood and featuring hits from composers George Gershwin, Irving Berlin and Cole Porter.

2017 marked the building's 100-year anniversary, and in that year, the Brisbane Festival partnered with The Tivoli, offering a program of local and international work.

The theatre, nicknamed The Tiv, retains its art deco features. It has played host to Australian musical groups such as Powderfinger and The Go-Betweens, along with major international artists such as Melanie Martinez, Bob Dylan, Shirley Bassey, Marianne Faithfull, Belle and Sebastian, and Taylor Swift.
