= Quan Yeomans =

Australian musician

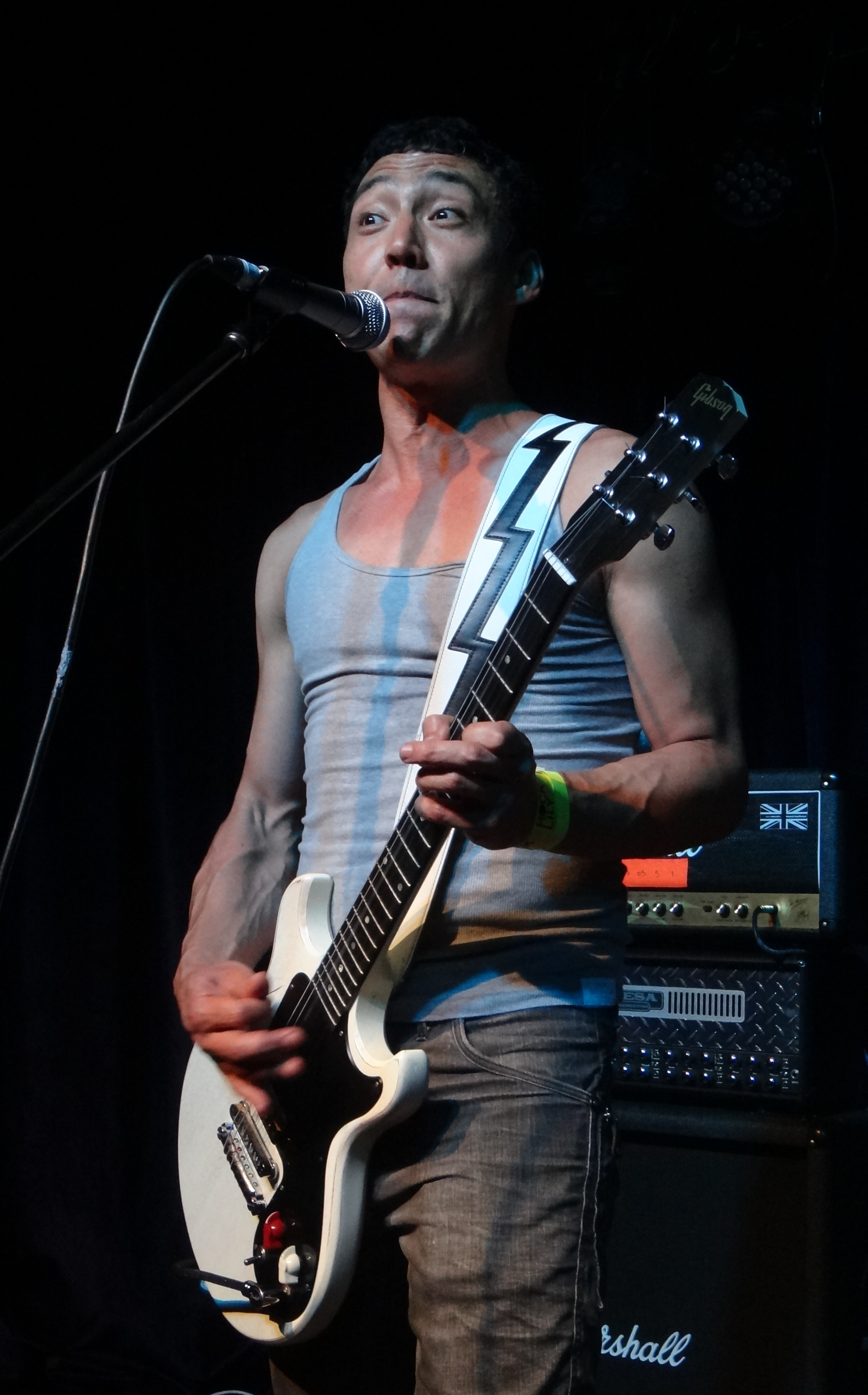
- Yeomans performing with Regurgitator in Sydney on 31 December 2012

Background information
- Born: 12 December 1972 (age 53); Sydney, New South Wales, Australia
- Genres: Rock, alternative rock, hip hop, electronica
- Occupations: Musician, songwriter, animator, producer
- Instruments: Guitar, vocals, keyboard, synthesizer, drums
- Years active: 1993–present
- Labels: Valve Records, Warner Bros.
- Member of: Regurgitator
- Formerly of: Zooerastia; Happyland

Quan Yeomans (born 12 December 1972) is an Australian musician best known as the frontman of the band Regurgitator.

== Early life ==
Yeomans was born in Sydney to a fifth-generation Australian father, Neville, and his mother Lien, a well-known Vietnamese Australian chef and author. His parents divorced during his childhood, during which he recalls listening to various Fleetwood Mac albums. At an early age Lien arranged for family friend and Channel Seven newsreader Peter Waltham to give music lessons for Quan in exchange for cooking lessons. In 1984, his family relocated to Brisbane and he attended Bardon Primary School before attending Kelvin Grove State High School until graduation in 1989. Yeomans travelled with his father in 1991 to Rio de Janeiro to the World Economic Forum, where he heard Indian scientist and author Vandana Shiva speak about the crippling, cyclic effects of debt on the Third World. He has stated, "To find out about that was a critical moment for me and inspired a lot of work that I did in the band [Regurgitator]".

== Career ==
=== Regurgitator ===
In 1993, Yeomans was the guitarist for Brisbane punk band Zooerastia. After meeting Pangaea bassist/vocalist Ben Ely on a bus, they would form Regurgitator with Yeomans on guitar/vocals and Martin Lee on drums. He has stated that he felt like a hypocrite by signing with major label Warner Music because of his views on the music industry as the mouthpiece of global capitalism.

Yeomans is the dominant composer in the group, owning the writing credits of over half the songs on each album. The majority of songs chosen for single releases are also his. Regurgitator's shift toward synth-driven ’80s-style pop on its second album Unit, which contrasted greatly to its earlier rock/hip hop-oriented works, is largely due to Yeomans' frustration with its male-dominant audience who embraced their heavier sound. Manager Paul Curtis recalls that he had once stated "thank god Grinspoon came along because [it] took all the male angst away from our shows".

=== Happyland ===
In 1996, Yeomans became acquainted with Janet English, bassist/vocalist for Melbourne-based band Spiderbait. The two started dating and the relationship lasted several years. The pair formed Happyland, an art pop band and released Welcome to Happyland in 1998, which spawned a few hits that received airplay on Triple J. The project has been inactive since 2000.

=== 2000 onward ===
Yeomans formed a solo project called BLOX and Quan the Amateur, releasing a self-titled album in December 2008 under the latter moniker. Quan: The Amateur was recorded in Hong Kong, where he resided at the time of recording, and Yeomans then performed the album on the 2009 Big Day Out tour.

Yeomans' hip-hop project Disaster!, featuring former girlfriend Emilie Goegan, played shows in Japan and Australia. Disaster! ceased recording because the couple ended its relationship.

From late 2013 to well into 2015, Regurgitator was on a period of indefinite hiatus due to personal matters and the geographical locations of Ely and Yeomans (the former resides in Melbourne, Australia, while the latter resides in Hong Kong). They started touring again in 2015 before recording Headroxx in 2018 and a children's album The Really Really Really Really Boring Album in 2019.

=== 2020 onward ===
In 2023, Yeomans released the solo 'Night Cream' EP. Quan with fellow Regurgitator members regrouped in 2022 with new recordings in mind, these culminated in 2024 as the album Invader.

== Musical and lyrical style ==
Yeomans' lyrical style has been described as a trademark postmodern lyricism and sceptical cynicism. He is known for the explicit lyrical content that appeared on Regurgitator's earlier releases. Songs such as "I Like It Like That", "Pop Porn" and "The World of Sleaze" deals with issues of sexism. Yeomans has acknowledged feminist performance artist and friend Kiley Gaffney as a major influence. He has also credited his father, a psychiatrist, as his "greatest intellectual and emotional influence. It is through his insights that I discovered the true nature of subversion, subtlety and brutality." Their attendance at the 1991 World Economic Forum directly influenced the lyrics for the song "G7 Dick Electro Boogie". Another reoccurring theme in Yeomans' lyrics is about musicians dealing with fame, which is possibly influenced by his own career. Regurgitator bassist/co-vocalist Ben Ely noted that "Quan was really playing around hardcore topics with cute pop songs" when asked about the controversial track "I Sucked A Lot of Cock To Get Where I Am".

== Personal life ==
Yeomans lived in Hong Kong with his partner and their first child was born in late 2013. As of 2019, he was residing in Melbourne. He has two children.

== Awards and nominations ==
=== ARIA Music Awards ===
The ARIA Music Awards is an annual awards ceremony that recognises excellence, innovation, and achievement across all genres of Australian music. They commenced in 1987.

Year	Nominee / work	Award	Result	Ref.
1998	"Black Bugs"	Best Video	Nominated	
1998	Quan Yeomans and Janet English for Happyland – Welcome to Happyland	Best Cover Art	Nominated	
