= Peter Kostic =

Australian drummer

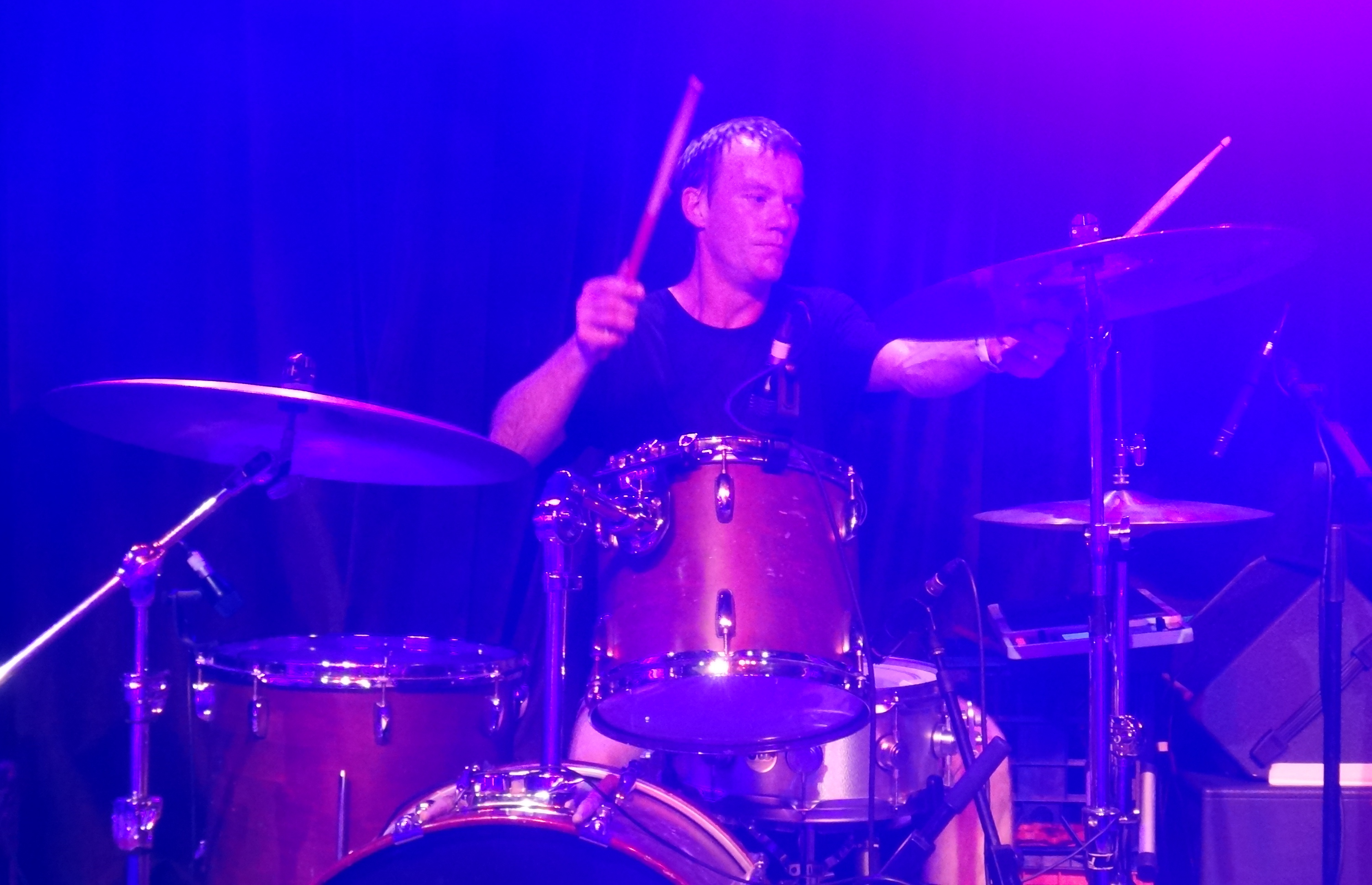
- Kostic performing with Regurgitator in Sydney on 31 December 2012

Background information
- Born: Australia
- Instrument: Drums

Peter Kostic is an Australian drummer best known as a member of Regurgitator and prolific black metal band Nazxul. Kostic joined Regurgitator in 1999 after its original drummer left. He has also been a member of Hard-Ons, Front End Loader, Kryptonics, Dead Boss and Vicious Hairy Mary.
