= Ben Ely =

Australian musician and artist

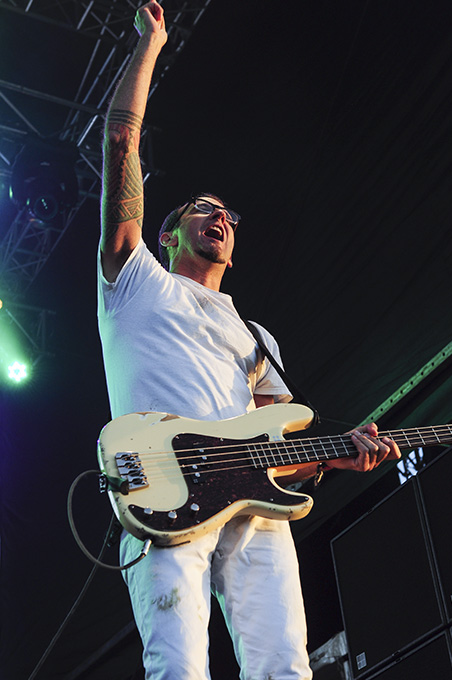
- Ely performing with Regurgitator in 2013

Background information
- Born: Benjamin Ely; 13 September 1970 (age 55); Brisbane, Queensland, Australia
- Genres: Rock, alternative rock, hip hop, electronica
- Occupations: Musician, songwriter, animator, producer
- Instruments: Bass guitar, vocals, synthesizer
- Years active: 1993–present
- Labels: Valve, Warner Bros.
- Website: www.regurgitator.net

Benjamin Ely (born 13 September 1970) is an Australian musician and artist best known for his work with alternative rock band Regurgitator.

== Early life ==
Born in Brisbane, Ely's family moved to the outer suburb of Cleveland. During his high school years he became friends with musicians members Dave Atkins and Jim Sinclair, with whom he would later form Pangaea. He met guitarist Quan Yeomans in 1993, with whom he formed Regurgitator. He claims that meeting Yeomans is the most important thing that has ever happened to him, stating that "I am a big fan of his work. I guess that helps when you play in a band with them". With regard to his musical influences, Ely has previously stated "Metallica and Black Sabbath made me who I am today".

== Music ==
Aside his tenure in Regurgitator, Ely has worked on other music projects:

- Pangaea is a punk and metal band from Brisbane, Australia that Ely fronted since the early 1990s.
- Jump 2 Light Speed released a self-titled album in 2006 and featured Ben Ely on bass and vocals, Graeme Kent on guitar (later replaced by former Channel V presenter Steve Bourke), Keita Tarlinton on keyboards and Stella Mozgawa on drums (later replaced by Tim Browning).
- Broken Head is a dub band featuring Skritch and Guy Webster and formerly Ely.
- The Stalkers is a punk band with Regurgitator member Peter Kostic along with Ray Ahn and Raymond Lalotoa.
- Ouch My Face is an experimental punk band from Melbourne, Australia featuring Ben Ely on Bass, Celeste Potter on guitar and vocals and Ben Wundersitz on drums.
- Pow Pow Wow
- Ely also co-wrote, (together with Decoder Ring), the music to the 2004 Australian film Somersault, starring Abbie Cornish. The soundtrack won an AFI Award for Best Original Music Score and the song 'Somersault' won the 2004 Best Original Song Composed for a Feature Film, Telemovie, TV Series or Mini-Series Award at the Australian Screen Music Awards.

== Personal life ==
Ely is also a successful practising artist and has exhibited work at The TAP Gallery in Darlinghurst, Sydney, and Flipbook Gallery in Brisbane as well as an exhibition in Fitzroy, Melbourne with his female Ouch My Face bandmate.

Game Over! art exhibition.

Ely was the partner of Yumi Stynes from 2001. They separated after eight years, in 2008. They have two daughters, Anouk and Dee Dee. He later remarried and had more children with his new partner.

== Discography ==
=== Albums ===
List of albums, with selected details
Title	Details
Goodbye Machine	Released: October 2015; Label: Valve Records (V143); Format: CD, LP, digital
Strange Tales of Drugs & Lost Love	Released: September 2017; Label: Valve Records (V149); Format: CD, LP, digital
The Golden Path	Released: July 2019; Label: Valve Records (V163); Format: CD, LP, digital
Zargon Oscillator Prose (as Ben Ely & the Mungo Fungo Band)	Released: 10 November 2023; Label: Valve Records; Format: CD, LP, digital
