= Magoo (music producer) =

Australian music producer

Magoo is the professional name of Lachlan Goold, an Australian music producer based in Brisbane, Queensland.

== Life and career ==
After working briefly in mechanical engineering, Magoo began in music as a live sound engineer, touring nationally before producing seasoned local Brisbane bands the Dreamkillers and Pangaea in the early 1990s. By the mid-1990s Magoo had recorded music by Powderfinger, as well as two EPs by Regurgitator. He rose to prominence with his production work on Regurgitator's debut album Tu-Plang, which also earned him his first ARIA award nominations in 1996.

In the late 1990s, Magoo was engaged to produce or engineer for a number of high-profile acts such as Midnight Oil and Skunkhour. In 1998, Magoo won the ARIA awards for both production and engineering, the former for his work on the Regurgitator album Unit, and the latter as a collective award for his work with Midnight Oil, Regurgitator and Skunkhour. He also produced records for Custard (Loverama) and ARIA-nominated artists Not From There, Jebediah, and Shihad; as well as records for Australian artists Front End Loader, Happyland, Screamfeeder, Sekiden, Isis, Dave McCormack and the Polaroids, The Boat People, Gota Cola, and Broken Head.

From 2002 to 2010, Magoo established his own recording facility, Black Box Recording, with Brisbane producer/engineer Jeff Lovejoy, continuing to work with classic Australian acts, such as Regurgitator, Spiderbait, Gerling, and Renee Geyer, End of Fashion, Dan Kelly and the Alpha Males, and Butterfingers. From August 31 to September 21, 2004, Magoo was part of a recording experiment conceived by Paul Curtis and Regurgitator in Federation Square, Melbourne. Referred to as Band in a Bubble, the project was a televised event on Channel V and captured the recording process for 24 hours a day, 21 days continuously.

In 2007, Magoo received ARIA award nominations for his work with Kate Miller-Heidke and Operator Please. Between 2007 and 2014, Magoo co-owned Applewood Lane—a boutique recording retreat, west of Brisbane, which was set in a converted church. He produced and recorded with artists the Jungle Giants, Saskwatch, Art Vs Science, Tex Perkins and the Dark Horses, An Horse and The Gin Club. Applewood Lane closed in 2014, and Magoo continues to mix and record for independent artists. In 2017, Magoo served as a judge for Happy Mag's inaugural Needle In The Hay vinyl competition.

In 2018 Magoo was awarded a PhD from the Queensland University of Technology. His dissertation was entitled "Space, time, creativity, and the changing character of the recording studio: Spatiotemporal attitudes toward 'DIY' recording". Magoo is currently a lecturer in Contemporary Music at the University of the Sunshine Coast.

== Awards and nominations ==
ARIA awards and nominations:

- 1996 (10th) - Nomination, Producer of the Year (Regurgitator - Tu-plang)
- 1996 (10th) - Nomination, Engineer of the Year (Regurgitator - Tu-plang)
- 1998 (12th) - Winner, Producer of the Year (Regurgitator - Unit)
- 1998 (12th) - Winner, Engineer of the Year (jointly for Midnight Oil - White Skin / Black Heart; Regurgitator - Unit; Skunkhour - Chin Chin)
- 1999 (13th) - Nomination, Producer of the Year (Automatic - Pump It Up)
- 1999 (13th) - Nomination, Producer of the Year (Custard - Loverama)
- 1999 (13th) - Nomination, Producer of the Year (Not From There - Sand On Seven)
- 1999 (13th) - Nomination, Engineer of the Year (Automatic - Pump It Up)
- 1999 (13th) - Nomination, Engineer of the Year (Midnight Oil - Redneck Wonderland)
- 2002 (16th) - Nomination, Producer of the Year (Gerling - When Young Terrorists Chase the Sun)
- 2003 (17th) - Nomination, Producer of the Year (Gerling - Bad Blood!!!)
- 2007 (21st) - Nomination, Producer of the Year (Kate Miller-Heidke - Little Eve)
- 2007 (21st) - Nomination, Engineer of the Year (Operator Please - Just a Song About Ping Pong)
