= Valve Records =

- Founded: 1994
- Founder: Paul Curtis
- Country of origin: Australia
- Official website: www.valverecords.com.au

Valve Records is an Australian independent record label that promotes both Australian and international artists. The label was founded by Paul Curtis in 1994. The label has over 100 releases.

== Artists ==
Over the past 14 years, Valve's range of artists has included such artists as: Anubian Lights, Audio Active, Bandito Folk, Boredoms, Broken Doll, Cobra Killer, Ed Kuepper, Curse ov Dialect, Custard, The Datsuns, Darth Vegas, Dear Nora, DJ Me DJ You, Drop the Lime, Dry & Heavy, Ex-Girl, Frikstailers, Full Fathom Five, Future Islands, Kiley Gaffney, Gonzales, I Heart Hiroshima, Ivy, Jakob, Kid606, Messer Chups, Mocky, Mono, New Pants, Ouch My Face, Omar Souleyman, Pangaea, Pony Loaf, Regurgitator, Scul Hazzards, Sekiden, Shonen Knife, Six Ft Hick, Soma Rasa, Stereo Total, Trans Am, ZA!, and Zoobombs.

== See also ==
- List of record labels
