= Lowtide discography =

- Studio albums: 1
- EPs: 1
- Singles: 5
- B-sides: 2
- Music videos: 4

The Australian indie rock band Lowtide's discography, as of 2017, currently consists of 1 studio album and extended play; five singles, of which 2 have B-sides and 4 music videos.

== Albums ==
=== Studio albums ===
Title	Album details		Sales
Title	Release date	Label	Sales
Lowtide	17 July 2014	Lost & Lonesome Recording Co. Opposite Number	—

=== Extended plays ===
Title	EP details		Sales
Title	Release date	Label	Sales
You Are My Good Light	July 1, 2010	Bandcamp	—

== Singles ==
Title	SIngle details			Sales
Title	Release date	Label	Album	Sales
"Underneath Tonight/Memory No. 7"	1 April 2010	Bandcamp	Standalone single	—
"Blue Movie"	1 May 2014	Lost & Lonesome Recording Co. Opposite Number	Lowtide	—
"Held"	6 June 2014	Lost & Lonesome Recording Co. Opposite Number	Lowtide	—
"Julia/Spring"	28 August 2015	Polyester Records Opposite Number	Standalone single	—
"Alibi"	3 August 2017	Rice Is Nice Opposite Number	TBA	—

=== Music videos ===
Title	Year	Director
"Blue Movie"	2014	Jamieson Moore
"Held"	2014	—
"Julia/Spring"	2015	Jamieson Moore
"Wedding Ring"	2016	Callum Ross-Thomson
