= Loot (EP) =

EP by The Clouds
- Released: April 1991
- Recorded: November 1990
- Studios: Megaphon Studios, Sydney
- Label: Red Eye / Polydor Records
- Producer: Tim Whitten

The Clouds chronology
Cloud Factory (1990)	Loot (1991)	Penny Century (1992)

Loot is the second extended play by Australian rock band The Clouds. Released in April 1991, the EP peaked at number 22 on the ARIA charts.

== Reception ==
In The Sell-In, Craig Mathieson said the EP was, "tough, alluring and sexy. The lead cut, Phillis's "Soul Eater", was seditious ear candy and it converted not only Triple J to Clouds but also made inroads at commercial FM stations." He also noted that new guitarist Dave Easton had "hardened up" the band with his aggressive playing.

== Track listing ==
Loot
No.	Title	Writer(s)	Length
1.	"Souleater"	Jodi Phillis	2:38
2.	"Heartless"	Trish Young	3:58
3.	"Sweetest Thing"	Young	2:52
4.	"4pm"	Phillis	2:32

== Charts ==
Chart (1991)	Peak position
Australia (ARIA)	22

== Release history ==
Region	Date	Format	Label	Catalogue
Australia	April 1991	12" LP; Cassette; CD	Red Eye Records / Polydor Records	879855-1, 879855-2, 879855-4
