= Red Wine and Blue =

Studio album by The Dearhunters
- Released: 1999
- Recorded: Bundeena, 1999
- Genre: Indie rock, Alternative country, Pop/Rock
- Label: Candle Records
- Producer: Cameron McCauley

The Dearhunters chronology
| Split 7" (1999) | Red Wine and Blue (1999) |

Red Wine and Blue is the first and only studio album by Australian alternative country band The Dearhunters, which was released in 1999.

== Background ==
The album was recorded in an "old beach shack", in Bundeena by Cameron McCauley in 1999.

Although Whittingham recorded the drum tracks for the album, he was replaced by Dave Ashton, who completed the touring that followed the release of "Red Wine and Blue".

=== Style ===
While remaining in the alternative country genre, "Red Wine and Blue" has been described as having a "dreamy" sound, with soft melodies and a melancholic tone. The album is largely built off of dual vocals between Oxley and Phillis.

== Reception ==
Professional ratings
Review scores
| Source | Rating |
|---|---|
| Allmusic | 4/5 stars |
| Comes with a smile | (positive) |

Jason MacNeil of Allmusic generally viewed "Red Wine and Blue" as positive, feeling that the album had a few very strong tracks, namely the opening song "Mr. Katherine" and the closing "Alienship". However, he felt that if the album suffered from something, it was that most of the tracks had similar arrangements, and virtually no digressions in composition.

== Track listing ==
| No. | Title | Length |
|---|---|---|
| 1. | "Mr. Katherine" | 2:53 |
| 2. | "Heads" | 4:06 |
| 3. | "All Over Now" | 5:01 |
| 4. | "Ivy" | 5:11 |
| 5. | "Another Heart" | 4:02 |
| 6. | "Ballerina" | 3:47 |
| 7. | "The Roman Song" | 2:45 |
| 8. | "Starling" | 4:49 |
| 9. | "Far From The Grace" | 3:10 |
| 10. | "Clothes" | 2:36 |
| 11. | "That Kind Of Love" | 4:02 |
| 12. | "Alienship" | 6:01 |

== Personnel ==
- Greg Hitchcock – guitars
- Tim Oxley – vocals, bass
- Jodi Phillis – vocals, guitar
- Raphael Whittingham – drums
