= Low Tide (disambiguation) =

Low Tide is a 2019 American drama film.

Low Tide may also refer to:

- Low tide, when the water in a tide stops falling
- Lowtide, an Australian indie rock band formed in 2008
  - Lowtide (album), 2014
- Low Tides (album), by This Wild Life, 2016
