= Happy Secret =

Compilation album by The Lucksmiths
- Released: 1999
- Recorded: 1998
- Genre: Indie pop
- Length: 27:43
- Label: Candle

The Lucksmiths chronology
A Good Kind of Nervous (1997)	Happy Secret (1999)	Why That Doesn't Surprise Me (2001)

Professional ratings
Review scores
Source	Rating
AllMusic	4/5 stars

Happy Secret is the fifth album by The Lucksmiths released in 1999 on Candle Records (catalogue number LUCKY6.) It is compilation of the tracks from four singles released in 1998.

== Track listing ==
1. "Untidy Towns" – 2:56
2. "Pin Cushion" – 2:52
3. "Edward, Sandwich Hand" – 2:29
4. "Abdication!" – 3:08
5. "The Art of Cooking for Two" – 2:20
6. "Don't Come with Me" – 2:12
7. "A Great Parker" – 4:22
8. "Southernmost" – 2:37
9. "Beer Nut" – 2:51
10. "Paper Planes" – 1:55
