= Sekiden =

Australian musical group

- Origin: Brisbane, Queensland, Australia
- Genres: Pop; jazz; blues
- Years active: 1998–2007
- Labels: Modular; EMI; Redline
- Past members: Simon Graydon; Mirko Vogel; Seja Vogel

Sekiden were an Australian three-piece pop band formed in Brisbane, Queensland in 1998 by Simon Graydon on lead guitar and vocals, Mirko Vogel on drums and his sister Seja on keyboards and lead vocals. They released two studio albums, Junior Fiction (2003) and Sound Instincts (2006), before disbanding in the following year. Seja Vogel was a touring member of Regurgitator from 2007 to 2009 and then worked as a solo artist to issue two albums, We Have Secrets But Nobody Cares (2010) and All Our Wires (2013).

== History ==
Sekiden were formed in Brisbane in 1998 by Simon Graydon on guitar and vocals, Mirko Vogel on drums and his sister, Seja Vogel on keyboards and vocals. Mirko recalled starting to drum as a ten-year-old and forming his first band, Vapour, while in primary school, "At first there were about 14 people in this band, like there were about 10 guitarists and stuff and I was the only one left so I was like, well I guess I'll play drums." Sekiden recorded a demo disc at Super Radiotron, which enabled them to sign with Modular Recordings.

In 2000 they released a five-track debut extended play, Better Music Through Mathematics, via Modular. Matt Attlee of Aus Music Scrapbook opined, "[it] has got me hooked, even if it seems that the 5 pop gems are over before they begin – but such is the sign of a great release that leaves you yearning for more. The stand out track would be 'Anywhere', blasting its way out of your speakers ... and making full use of the alternating boy/girls vocals." BrisPop.com's Andrew Tuttle felt, "[it] consists mainly of tracks from their Super Radiotron demo, but the sound on this EP is far more professional... 'Anywhere', my personal favourite, was in my opinion one of the highlight tracks of 2000. This track mixes punky fuzzed-up guitars with cutesy love song lyrics and fat synths. The keyboard explosion sounds in the bridge are a delight to hear, especially with headphones on."

Sekiden's second EP, Love Songs for Robots (June 2001) with six tracks, was launched at The Healer, where Joanne Bell of BrisPop.com observed, "their sound was chock-full of implausibly crunchy guitar, fuzzy synth, odd machine noises, and elaborate but inobtrusive drumwork. So much push that there's no aural trigger to wonder about the absence of a bassplayer... Highlights for my money were Mirko's highly amusing drum solos, Simon's Leapingest Guitarist action, Seja&Mirko's keyboard duet." The EP peaked at No. 25 on the ARIA Alternative Singles Chart. MediaSearch's Carmine Pascuzzi felt, "[its] a very intoxicating sound from an eclectic group from Brisbane who thrive on bringing something new from past synths exponents. This is their second release and it contains fuzzy pop gems... There's plenty to look forward to from this act."

In May 2003 Sekiden signed with Perth-based label, Redline Records. The group's debut album, Junior Fiction, appeared on 25 August 2003 via Redline. It was recorded in October 2002 at Blackbox Studio, Brisbane, with Magoo producing (Regurgitator, Skunkhour, Shihad) and Matt Maddock as audio engineer. Jasper Lee of Oz Music Project noticed, "The face of Australian geek electro-pop, Sekiden bring their sound back to their indie rock roots in their long awaited debut album... [their] sound now orientated to a US college rock with electro trimming, Team Sekiden are able to broaden their scope in tracks through the eleven songs of the album. The electro influences still permeate through the woodwork albeit with less scope. The effect is mixed as there are some songs seem a bit exposed in places." Sekiden toured Australia, Japan, the United States and Canada.

Mirko described his song writing, "Sad music is really easy to make, cos it's easy to be depressed. Writing happy songs that don't sound like you're taking the piss can be pretty hard. Basically that's our aim, to make songs that are happy and that make people feel good about themselves when they come to see us." The group's second studio album, Sound Instincts (3 April 2006), had Mess+Noise's Adrian Trajstman declare, "[they] can't put a foot wrong. Picture pitch-perfect showdowns between modulated sawtooth melodies and charmingly tidy guitar chug, making for dense, forthright fuzz-pop. Expertly executed!" Sekiden disbanded in 2007 with Seja Vogel joining Regurgitator as an auxiliary musician on keyboards. She was a backing musician for other artists, Dave McCormack, Heinz Reigler, the Mess Hall and Spod, before starting her solo career. She has issued two albums, We Have Secrets But Nobody Cares (2010) and All Our Wires (2013).

== Members ==
- Simon Graydon – guitar, vocals (1998–2007)
- Mirko Vogel – drums (1998–2007)
- Seja Vogel – keyboards, vocals (1998–2007)

== Discography ==
=== Albums ===
- Junior Fiction (25 August 2003) – Redline Records/Shock Records (RED018)
- Sound Instincts (3 April 2006) – Valve Records/MGM Distribution (V71) Bad News Records (Japan)

=== Extended plays ===
- Better Music Through Mathematics (2000) – Modular Recordings
- Love Songs for Robots (June 2001) – Modular Recordings/EMI Records (MODEP003) AUS Alt: No. 25

=== Singles ===
- "1+1=Heartache" (16 June 2003) – Redline Records
- "Up in the Air" (2006) – Valve Records
