= Big Knife =

Big Knife may refer to:

- The Big Knife, 1955 American film
- The Big Knife (play), 1949 American play by Clifford Odets
- Big Knife Provincial Park, a small provincial park in central Alberta, Canada
- Osla Big Knife, an Anglo-Saxon King of Kent, 6th century
- Sami knife, a long, wide blade traditionally used by the Sami people

== See also ==
- Big Knives
- The Small Knives
