= The Welcome Mat =

Australian indie rock group

- Origin: Sydney, New South Wales, Australia
- Genres: Australian indie rock, alternative rock
- Years active: 1989–1997
- Labels: Regular/Festival, Id/Mercury
- Spinoffs: Knievel; 2 Litre Dolby; the Small Knives
- Past members: Wayne Connolly; Cory Messenger; Leo Mullins; Peter Bennett; David Moss; Andrew Nunns

The Welcome Mat were a four-piece Australian indie rock group which formed in 1989 and broke up in January 1997. Throughout the early-to-mid-1990s, their songs "Last of the Great Letdowns", "Cake", "Landspeed", "10,000 People", "Hell Hoping", "Play Me" and "Hey! Illusion" topped the Australian alternative charts, with the videos receiving play on Rage and MTV Australia. The first band ever to play Australia's Big Day Out festival, The Welcome Mat had toured extensively around Australia with the likes of the Hoodoo Gurus, Died Pretty, Buffalo Tom, The Lemonheads, The Wonder Stuff, You Am I, Smudge and Bob Dylan.

== Biography ==
The Welcome Mat were formed in Sydney, Australia in 1989 by songwriters Wayne Connolly and Cory Messenger. Drummer Peter Bennett and bassist David Moss worked with Connolly at Fairlight digital audio company, and were asked to help work on songs demoed on a Tascam four-track recorder. The guitar-based songs were heavily influenced by New Zealand's Flying Nun Records label, as well as US Indie rock performers R.E.M., Hüsker Dü, the Replacements, Dinosaur Jr, The Lemonheads, Buffalo Tom, and UK bands The Smiths, The Stone Roses and The Wonderstuff.

Inspired by the unexpected commercial success of their friends The Hummingbirds, Connolly and Messenger approached local promoter Steve Pavlovic, who booked the band's live debut, a mid-week gig at the Lansdowne Hotel in inner-city Chippendale in January 1990. The name The Welcome Mat was chosen at the last minute by Connolly, in the belief that it was reminiscent of the name of another musical influence, The Wedding Present.

In 1990 Waterfront Records founder Chris Dunn agreed to distribute a vinyl 7-inch single, "Last of the Great Letdowns", recorded at Sunshine 16-track recording studios in Surry Hills in May 1990. The record appeared on the band's own Plenny O'Hooks label in late 1990. It garnered a small amount of airplay on local community radio stations such as Sydney's 2SER, Melbourne's 3RRR and 3PBS, and Brisbane's 4ZzZ, allowing the band to tour the East Coast of Australia.

In 1991 The Welcome Mat released their second single, "Cake", and the E.P. Fairydust (a reference to the "Troggs Tapes"), which featured "10,000 People". Both "Cake" and "10,000 People" received airplay on the newly-national triple j radio network, boosting the band's audience significantly. Around that time, Moss left the group and was replaced by ex-Benedicts member Leo Mullens, adding another songwriter to the line-up.

After appearing as the opening act at the first Big Day Out, the band was signed to Martin Fabinyi's Regular Records in 1992. They released the E.P. Spare and recording their debut album, Gram, at Paradise Studios in Darlinghurst, Sydney, with US production team Sean Slade and Paul Q. Kolderie (Dinosaur Jr., Hole, Radiohead, Warren Zevon, Sebadoh). National tours with Hunters and Collectors and Buffalo Tom followed in late 1992. During that year the band also appeared at Brisbane's Livid Festival. In January 1993 the band once again opened the Big Day Out festival in Sydney.

Although most of their previous singles and E.P.s had topped the ARIA Australian alternative charts, Gram and its singles "Hell Hoping" and "Play Me" failed to achieve mainstream commercial success. The band left Regular Records in 1994, releasing a single, "All or Nothing More," and the self-funded Headset E.P. on Melbourne independent label Summershine. Signing to id/Mercury in 1996, they released a second album, Lap of Honour, produced by Brad Shepherd of the Hoodoo Gurus. Drummer Peter Bennett left the group before the "Lap of Honour" release, and Autohaze drummer Andrew Nunns filled in for some shows.

After Lap of Honour and its singles "Hey! Illusion" and "Can't Wait to Remind You" failed to chart significantly, and following many months of record company difficulties and band in-fighting, The Welcome Mat played their final show at the Annandale Hotel in Sydney in 1997. Connolly has since played with Knievel, Mullens with 2 Litre Dolby and the Small Knives, and Messenger with Auto Circus Cop.

== Discography ==
=== Albums ===
List of albums, with selected details and chart positions
Title	Album details	Peak chart positions
Title	Album details	AUS
Gram	Released: April 1993; Format: CD; Label: Regular/Festival (D 30942)	107
Lap of Honour	Released: 1996; Format: CD; Label: Regular/Festival (5327382)	-

=== Extended plays ===
List of EPs, with selected details and chart positions
Title	EP details	Peak chart positions
Title	EP details	AUS
Fairydust	Released: 1991; Format: CD; Label: Plenny O' Hooks	141
Spare	Released: May 1992; Format: CD; Label: Regular/Festival (D 16026)	81
Headset	Released: 1994; Format: CD; Label: Summershine (SHINE 046CD)	—

=== Singles ===
List of singles, with selected chart positions
Title	Year	Chart positions	Album
Title	Year	AUS	Album
"Last of the Great Letdowns"	1990	—	Non-album single
"Cake"/"Coming to the Worst"	1991	—	Fairydust
"Hell Hoping"	1993	121	Gram
"Play Me"	1993	123	Gram
"All or Nothing More"	1994	—	Non-album single
"Hey! Illusion"	1996	91	Lap of Honour
"Can't Wait to Remind You"	1996	—	Lap of Honour
