= Where Were We? =

Where Were We? may refer to:

- Where Were We? (album), a 2002 album by The Lucksmiths
- Where Were We? (How I Met Your Mother), an episode of the television series How I Met Your Mother
