= Why That Doesn't Surprise Me =

Studio album by The Lucksmiths
- Released: 2001
- Recorded: December 2000 – January 2001
- Genre: Indie pop
- Length: 48:11
- Label: Candle

The Lucksmiths chronology
Happy Secret (1999)	Why That Doesn't Surprise Me (2001)	Where Were We? (2002)

Professional ratings
Review scores
Source	Rating
AllMusic	4/5 stars

Why That Doesn't Surprise Me is the sixth album by The Lucksmiths, released on 5 March 2001 on Candle Records (catalogue number CAN2513).

== Track listing ==
1. "Music to Hold Hands To" – 3:47
2. "Synchronised Sinking" – 3:56
3. "The Great Dividing Range" – 3:17
4. "Beach Boys Medley" – 1:16
5. "Broken Bones" – 3:36
6. "First Cousin" – 4:04
7. "Don't Bring Your Work to Bed" – 2:44
8. "Fear of Rollercoasters" – 3:33
9. "Harmonicas and Trams" – 4:45
10. "The Forgetting of Wisdom" – 2:01
11. "Self-Preservation" – 2:02
12. "How to Tie a Tie" – 3:24
13. "All the Recipes I've Ever Ruined" – 5:46
14. "The Year of Driving Languorously" – 4:00
