= The Smallgoods =

Australian band

- Origin: Port Fairy, Victoria, Australia
- Genres: Indie pop
- Years active: 2009–present
- Members: Gus Franklin; Lachlan Franklin; Ben Mason; Shags Chamberlain; J.L.Jeffery
- Website: www.thesmallgoods.com

The Smallgoods are an Australian indie pop band originally from the Victorian coastal town of Port Fairy, later based in Melbourne. The band's music draws on influences from 1960s artists such as The Beatles and The Byrds, along with more recent pop influences.

The band was originally a four-piece consisting of brothers, Gus and Lachlan Franklin, Ben Mason and Shags Chamberlain who established themselves on the Warrnambool pub scene in 1999 - Ben and Lachlan were playing in local cover band, Slight Return, Gus having achieved 15 minutes of fame with his Triple J Unearthed winning group, Gramps, and Shags playing keyboards with the Port Fairy band, The Pimps.

"We were called Lukewerm originally, which was kind of on the right track but not the right train. I hated the name. It came about because we shopped this demo around and someone gave us a gig and we needed a name and it just kind of came out. The Smallgoods is a '60s-ish kind of name and we're a '60s-ish kind of band. It kind of stuck, even though it means 'meat products'" - Ben Mason

Their debut album, Listen to the Radio was recorded over two years with the help of Melbourne producer and musician Paul Thomas (The Huxton Creepers, Weddings Parties Anything and Custard). It was released by Half A Cow records in November 2003 receiving airplay on National Youth broadcaster, Triple J and community radio stations across Australia including 3RRR (Melbourne), PBS (Melbourne), FBi (Sydney), 2SER (Sydney), 3D Radio (Adelaide), 4ZZZ (Brisbane) and RTRFM (Perth). The song "Abraham Lincoln" appeared on a split 7-inch shared with New Yorkers, The Essex Green.

The Smallgoods played headline shows in Sydney, Canberra, Newcastle and Adelaide, and the Port Fairy Folk Festival in 2003.

In 2007 the band signed with Melbourne's Lost and Lonesome Record Company and with help from engineer Marcus Barczak (Art of Fighting, Midstate Orange, The Small Knives) they released their latest album, Down on the Farm, in August 2007.

== Discography ==
- Down on the Farm LP (Lost & Lonesome Recording Co., 11 August 2007)
- "Traipse through the Valley" (Lost & Lonesome Recording Co., July 2007)
- This is the Show EP (Half A Cow, 9 August 2004)
- Listen to the Radio LP (Half A Cow, 3 November 2003)
- "Abraham Lincoln" (2003)
- Get Up EP (Half A Cow, 2002)
- 120Y EP (independent, 2000)

== Members ==
- Gus Franklin
- Lachlan Franklin
- Ben Mason
- Shags Chamberlain
- J.L.Jeffery
