= A Good Kind of Nervous =

Studio album by The Lucksmiths
- Released: 1997
- Recorded: October 1997
- Genre: Indie pop
- Length: 33:32
- Label: Candle

The Lucksmiths chronology
What Bird Is That? (1996)	A Good Kind of Nervous (1997)	Happy Secret (1999)

Professional ratings
Review scores
Source	Rating
AllMusic	3/5 stars

A Good Kind of Nervous is the fourth album by The Lucksmiths released in 1997 on Candle Records (catalogue number LUCKY5.)

== Track listing ==
1. "Caravanna" – 3:05
2. "Under the Rotunda" – 2:51
3. "Train Robbers' Wives" – 1:55
4. "World Encyclopedia of Twentieth Century Murder" – 3:42
5. "The Invention of Ordinary Everyday Things" – 2:55
6. "Punchlines" – 3:09
7. "Guess How Much I Love You" – 3:22
8. "Columns O' Steam" – 2:08
9. "Up" – 1:31
10. "Wyoming" – 2:57
11. "Little Athletics" – 5:57
