= Darren Hanlon =

Australian singer-songwriter (born 1973)

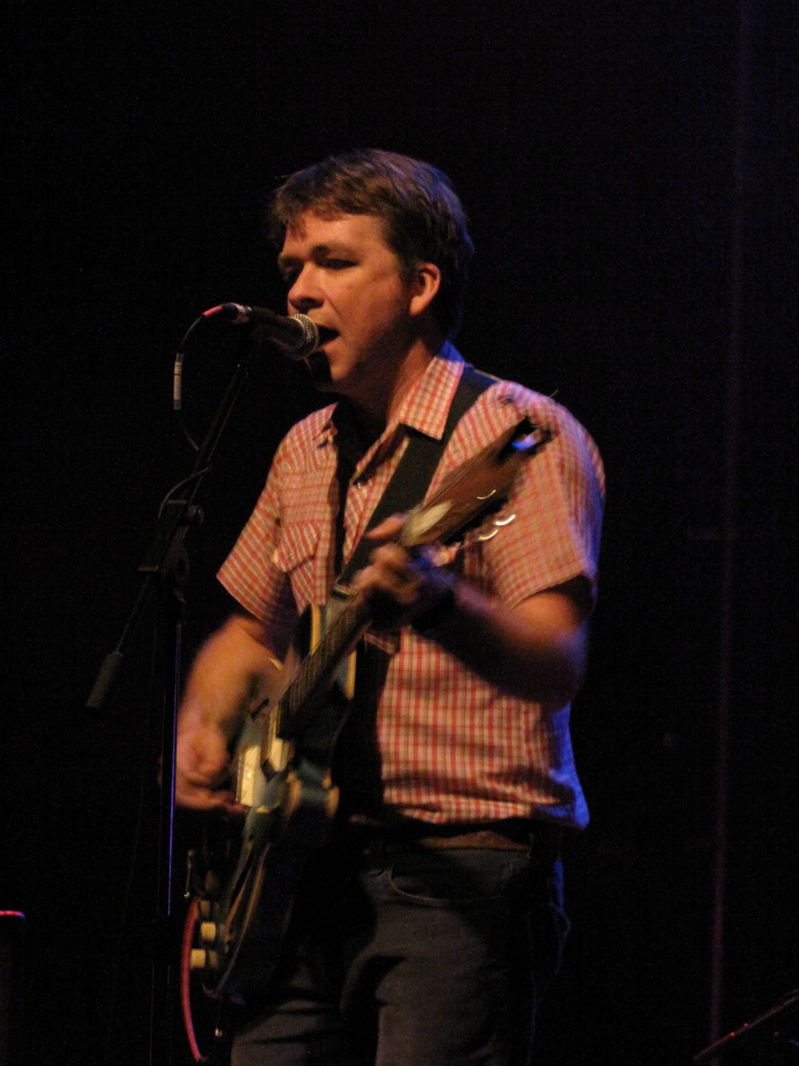
- Darren Hanlon in March 2011

Background information
- Born: 16 June 1973 (age 53)
- Origin: Gympie, Queensland, Australia
- Genres: Folk rock, folk pop, folk punk
- Occupations: Singer, songwriter
- Instruments: Vocals, guitar, banjo, ukulele
- Years active: 1994–present
- Labels: Flippin Yeah Records, Candle Records; Yep Roc Records (US)
- Partner: Shelley Short
- Website: darrenhanlon.com

Darren Hanlon (born 16 June 1973) is an Australian singer-songwriter from Gympie, Queensland. Prior to becoming a solo artist in 1999, Hanlon was a member of Lismore indie rock band The Simpletons, with whom he released four albums and several EPs prior to their 1997 split. Hanlon also contributed backing guitar and keyboards for The Lucksmiths, The Dearhunters, and Mick Thomas. Hanlon describes his style of music as "urban folk," and has been described by Pitchfork as having "distinctive narrative vision" in his music.

== Career ==
Hanlon has released five solo albums, four EPs, and nine singles on Candle Records and Flippin Yeah industries, as well as several compilation tracks. After the dissolution of Candle Records, he has started his own pseudo-label called Flippin Yeah Records in 2008. He self-published his first 'zine in late 2017.

Hanlon is known for his engagement with his audiences, through his down-to-earth storytelling at live gigs. He has toured with the Weather Station, Michael Hurley, Billy Bragg, David Dondero, Tim Kasher, Violent Femmes, The Magnetic Fields, and Courtney Barnett. Barnett name-checked Hanlon as an early influence on her own writing. Described as having "a certain brilliance", Hanlon has also been praised as "a spectacular songwriter; able to create a whole scene from the sum of its subtleties and wit interspersed with poignant moments."

Hanlon's song "Punk's not Dead" was voted in at number 45 in the 2002 Triple J Hottest 100 listener poll. His song "Happiness Is A Chemical" placed at number 68 in the 2006 poll.

In 2015 Hanlon released his fifth solo album, Where Did You Come From? Songs were recorded in New Orleans, Memphis, Muscle Shoals, Nashville and Clarksdale, with an array of musicians he met along the way, from instrumentalists of popular music Spooner Oldham, David Hood, Howard Grimes, to unknown buskers and street musicians.

Hanlon performs Christmas concerts in December of each year, and has done since 2005. The shows, mostly held in churches and halls, routinely sell out each year.

Hanlon has a son with his partner US folk singer Shelley Short.

== Discography ==
Darren Hanlon Performing in Perth November 2006

=== Studio albums ===
Title	Album details
Hello Stranger	Released: August 2002; Label: Candle Records (CAN 2522); Formats: CD, Digital download
Little Chills	Released: 2004; Label: Candle Records (CAN 2540); Formats: CD, Digital download
Fingertips And Mountaintops	Released: November 2006; Label: Candle Records (CAN 2551); Formats: CD, Digital download
I Will Love You At All	Released: 2010; Label: Flippin Yeah Industries (FYI004); Formats: CD, Digital download
Where Did You Come From?	Released: 2015; Label: Flippin Yeah Industries (FYI014); Formats: CD, 2×LP, Digital download, streaming
Life Tax	Released: 4 March 2022; Label: Flippin Yeah Records (FYR022); Formats: CD, LP, Digital download, streaming

==== Compilation albums ====
Title	Album details
Pointing Ray Guns At Pagans	Released: 2009; Label: Flippin Yeah Industries (FYI002); Formats: CD, CD+DVD, Digital download, streaming

==== EPs ====
Title	Album details
Early Days	Released: 2000; Label: Candle Records (CAN 2511); Formats: CD
(Methods of Getting Rid of) Hiccups	Released: 2002; Label: Candle Records (CAN 2524); Formats: CD
Christmas Songs	Released: 2005; Label: Candle Records (CAN 2546); Formats: 7" LP, Digital download

== Zines ==
Turning his creativity to the written word, Darren Hanlon planned to write a series of stories based on conversations he has with barbers. He self-published his first 11-page zine in late 2017 and is called the Cutting Remarks series.
