= Cuddlefish =

Cuddlefish may refer to:

- Cuddlefish, an Australian music group with Candle Records
- Mimi and Lester Cuttlefish, characters in the animated sitcom Teenage Euthanasia

== See also ==
- Cuttlefish
