= What Bird Is That =

What Bird Is That?

Studio album by The Lucksmiths
- Released: 1996
- Recorded: August 1996
- Genre: Indie pop
- Length: 33:20
- Label: Candle

The Lucksmiths chronology
The Green Bicycle Case (1995)	What Bird Is That? (1996)	A Good Kind of Nervous (1997)

What Bird Is That? is the third album by The Lucksmiths released in 1996 on Candle Records (catalogue number LUCKY4.)

== Track listing ==
1. "Shine on Me" – 3:03
2. "Silver Friends" – 3:03
3. "Off with His Cardigan!" – 2:06
4. "Macintyre" – 2:17
5. "Snug" – 1:40
6. "Putt Putt" – 2:34
7. "Day in the City" – 2:24
8. "Housewarming" – 2:57
9. "The Drunkest Man in the World" – 1:50
10. "Twenty-Two" – 3:07
11. "Jennifer Jason" – 1:19
12. "Danielle Steel" – 2:06
13. "Frisbee" – 2:35
14. "I Am About to Sail" – 2:19
