= Laurels (disambiguation) =

Laurels evergreen trees or shrub of the genus Laurus (3 species)

- Laurel (plant) a list of other plant species known as laurels

Laurels may also refer to:

- Laurels (English greyhound race), a competition held at Perry Barr Stadium
- Laurels (Irish greyhound race), a competition held at Curraheen Park
- The Laurels (band), an Australian band
