= Naturaliste =

Studio album by The Lucksmiths
- Released: 10 March 2003
- Recorded: August 2002 to December 2002
- Studios: Audrey Studios, Richmond
- Genre: Indie pop
- Length: 44:13
- Label: Candle
- Producer: Craig Pilkington

The Lucksmiths chronology
Where Were We? (2002)	Naturaliste (2003)	Warmer Corners (2005)

Naturaliste is the fifth studio album by the Australian indie pop trio, the Lucksmiths, which was released on 10 March 2003 via Candle Records (catalogue number LUCKY16). The band members Marty Donald on guitar, backing vocals and glockenspiel; Mark Monnone on bass guitar, guitar, harmonium and backing vocals; and Tali White on drums, percussion and lead vocals. They all contributed to the song writing. Craig Pilkington (The Killjoys) produced the album at Audrey Studios in Richmond. He also provided lead guitar, brass, piano and harmonium.

== Details ==
Donald said, "With this album, one of the things we wanted to do was return it to the basic sound we started out with, and we've always retained live. Our approach has evolved and there have been changes, but I really like the idea of having some kind of limitations. I know we're not one of those bands that are constantly re-inventing themselves - I think it's a bit of a conceit presume that you can reinvent yourself constantly, or that you need to."

== Reception ==
Pitchfork noted, "many of the band's hallmarks-- clever turns of phrases, a gift for sweet melodies, an odd obsession with the weather-- are present, but their once mostly jaunty, jangly pop is now often swapped for wistful, plaintive melodies. The band seems to be grappling with the perils of advancing age." Rhythms also noted the "maturing and expanding songwriting abilities" that "provoke a yearning for the simpler worldview of youth".

Alternately, AllMusic said the album, "may be their strongest record yet. It is filled with great songs, wonderfully sweet vocal performances, witty and pithy lyrics, and clean arrangements (mostly guitars and drums but filled out with subtle strings and horns), as are all their albums. There's nothing really new or different; everything is just one notch better." Drowned in Sound claimed the album was, "the melodic equivalent of a change in season, and only the most obscure form of tunnel vision could fail to recognise the desolate beauty that raises its impregnable head with every continuous play of this album."

Professional ratings
Review scores
Source	Rating
AllMusic	4/5 stars
Pitchfork	6.2/10 stars
Drowned in Sound	7/10 stars

== Track listing ==
1. "Camera-Shy" (Marty Donald/Lucksmiths) – 3:36
2. "The Sandringham Line" (Donald/Lucksmiths) – 5:26
3. "Take This Lying Down" (Mark Monnone/Lucksmiths) – 3:24
4. "Midweek Midmorning" (Donald/Lucksmiths) – 3:05
5. "The Perfect Crime" (Monnone/Lucksmiths) – 5:29
6. "What You’ll Miss" (Tali White/Lucksmiths) – 4:23
7. "There Is a Boy That Never Goes Out" (Donald/Lucksmiths) – 2:08
8. "What Passes for Silence" (Donald/Lucksmiths) – 4:11
9. "Stayaway Stars" (Donald/Lucksmiths) – 3:55
10. "Sleep Well" (Monnone/Lucksmiths) – 3:40
11. "The Shipwreck Coast" (Donald/Lucksmiths) – 4:56

Song writing credits:
