= Warmer Corners =

Studio album by The Lucksmiths
- Released: 11 April 2005
- Genre: Indie pop
- Label: Candle Records

The Lucksmiths chronology
| Naturaliste (2003) | Warmer Corners (2005) | First Frost (2008) |

Professional ratings
Aggregate scores
| Source | Rating |
|---|---|
| Metacritic | 80/100 |
Review scores
| Source | Rating |
| AllMusic | 4/5 stars |
| Cokemachineglow | 77% |
| Drowned in Sound | 8/10 |
| NME | 5/10 |
| Pitchfork | 8.3/10 |
| PopMatters | 7/10 |
| Sputnikmusic | 4.5/5 |
| Stylus | A− |
| Uncut | 8/10 |

Warmer Corners is the ninth album by The Lucksmiths released on April 11, 2005 on Candle Records (catalogue number LUCKY19.)

== Track listing ==
1. "A Hiccup in Your Happiness" (Donald) – 2:48
2. "The Music Next Door" (Donald) – 4:33
3. "Great Lengths" (Donald) – 3:28
4. "Now I'm Even Further Away" (Monnone) – 1:52
5. "The Chapter in Your Life Entitled San Francisco" (Donald) – 4:29
6. "Sunlight in a Jar" (White) – 3:22
7. "If You Lived Here, You'd Be Home Now" (Donald) – 4:48
8. "Young and Dumb" (Monnone) – 3:27
9. "Putting It off and Putting It off" (Donald) – 2:46
10. "I Don't Want to Walk Around Alone No More" (Monnone) – 3:09
11. "The Fog of Trujillo" (Monnone) – 4:15
12. "Fiction" (Donald) – 4:40
