= Only Angels Have Wings (disambiguation) =

Only Angels Have Wings is a 1939 film starring Cary Grant and Jean Arthur.

Only Angels Have Wings may also refer to:

- "Only Angels Have Wings", a song by The Lucksmiths from The Green Bicycle Case
- "Only Angels Have Wings", a song by Renaissance from Azure d'Or
