= Seja Vogel =

German-born Australian musician

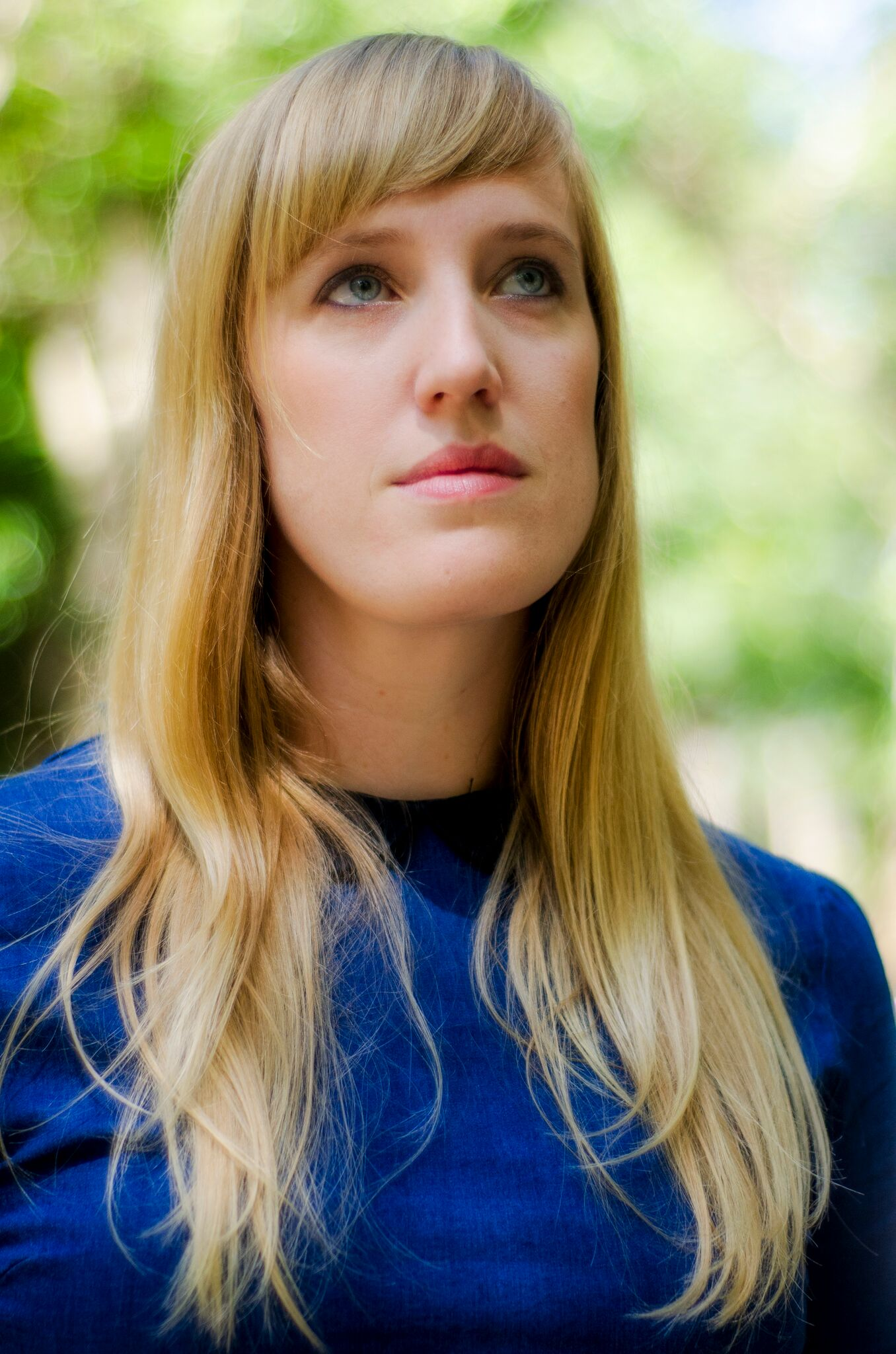

Background information
- Born: Kassel, West Germany
- Instruments: Vocals, keyboards, guitar
- Label: Rice Is Nice
- Formerly of: Sekiden, Regurgitator

Seja Vogel (pronounced say-ah; born 21 May 1981) is a German-Australian musician who was a member of Brisbane bands Sekiden and Regurgitator.

== Early life ==
Vogel was born on 21 May 1981 in Kassel, West Germany. She grew up in Stuttgart before moving to Australia with her family when she was seven years old. She attended a Steiner School and often credits her creativity to her early Steiner Education. Vogel learnt violin and piano at an early age, and became interested in synthesizers after hearing bands like The Cars, Devo and Kraftwerk in high school.

== Musical career ==
Formed in 1998, Sekiden released two albums and two EPs. The band was known for high-energy live performances and they toured extensively throughout Australia, Canada, Japan and the US, touring with bands such as the Zoobombs. Sekiden released music through Modular Records, Australian independent labels Redline Records and Valve, Japanese label Bad News, and the American Boompa! label.

Vogel joined iconic genre-mashers Regurgitator in 2007 as a touring member and also contributed to their studio album Love and Paranoia that was recorded in Brazil. Vogel also played in the backing bands of Spod, Heinz Reigler, Ben Salter and David McCormack.

Vogel later recorded and performed under her own name for the album We Have Secrets But Nobody Cares, released through Sydney record label Rice Is Nice on 27 March 2010. Vogel toured widely following the release of the album and supported acts such as Sarah Blasko, Goldfrapp and Warpaint.

In between touring and recording, Vogel started a textile label named 'Pul(sew)idth' that produces miniature felt replicas of instruments made by Vogel herself.

Seja's much anticipated third album Here Is One I Know You Know is both a leap in production and described as an ode to analogue. The album is self-produced and recorded in her home studio in Brisbane. It is a dense collection of squelchy synths, drum machines and computer bongos with accompanying lyrics about self critical and often tongue in cheek self deprecation. The album welcomes a few close friends playing on acoustic instruments, including Jen Boyce (Ball Park Music) on bass, Stella Mozgawa (Warpaint (band)) on percussion, Fred Armisen (SNL, Portlandia) on octobans, Georgia Mooney (All Our Exes Live in Texas) on backing vocals, George Browning (Velociraptor) on drums and percussion, Nicole Perry on congas, Chris Farrer (the Quickening) on guitar solos, Conrad Greenleaf (Richard in Your Mind) on bass and Danny Widdicombe (the Wilson Pickers) on pedal steel.

== Podcast ==
At the end of 2016, Seja started her podcast HearSej where she talks to musicians and other creatives about their careers in a casual and intimate conversation. At the end of each episode, Seja asks her guest about the strangest experience they have had, as a result of their chosen line of work. Some guests include Kevin Mitchell of Jebediah, Sarah Blasko, Megan Washington, Benjamin Law, Fred Armisen and Jeff Tweedy (Wilco).

== Discography ==
Albums

- We Have Secrets But Nobody Cares (2010) – Rice Is Nice
- All Our Wires (2013) – Rice Is Nice
- Here Is One I Know You Know (2023) – It Records

Singles

- "I'll Get to You" (2010)
- "Like Fireflies" (2013)
- "Cmon (2013)
- "When You Said You Were Mine" (2013)
- "All Your Sorries" (2022)
- "Home" (2023)
