= Boondoggle (disambiguation) =

A boondoggle is a scheme that wastes time and money.

Boondoggle or boon doggle may also refer to:

- Boondoggle (EP), an EP by The Lucksmiths
- Boondoggle (web series), an American comedy web series
- Scoubidou, a knotting and plaiting craft known in the U.S. and Canada as "boondoggle"
- Gimp (thread), a type of thread used in making boondoggles and lanyards
- Woggle, a scout's neckerchief fixing known alternatively as a "boon doggle"
