= Anthem (The Clouds song) =

1992 single by Clouds

Single by Clouds

from the album Penny Century
- Released: February 1992
- Length: 2:13
- Label: Red Eye; Polydor
- Songwriter(s): Trish Young
- Producer(s): Tim Whitten

Clouds singles chronology
| "Hieronymous" (1991) | "Anthem" (1992) | "Say It" (1992) |

"Anthem" is a song by Australian rock band Clouds, released in February 1992 as the second and final single from the band's debut studio album, Penny Century (1991). A limited edition came with a bonus VHS featuring four video clips. The single peaked at number 47 on the Australian Singles Chart.

== Track listing ==
CD, 7-inch, and cassette single

1. "Anthem"
2. "For a Few Bucks More"
3. "Tear Me Apart"
4. "Swim"
5. "Eemush" (silent track)

VHS single

1. "Anthem" – 2:10
2. "Soul Eater" – 2:38
3. "Hieronymous" – 3:47
4. "Cloud Factory" – 3:48

== Charts ==
| Chart (1992) | Peak position |
|---|---|
| Australia (ARIA) | 47 |
