= Belles Will Ring =

Australian alternative rock band

- Origin: Blue Mountains, Sydney
- Genres: rock, alternative rock, psychedelic rock
- Years active: 2005–Present
- Members: Liam Judson, Aidan Roberts, Lauren Crew, Joe Driver
- Website: www.belleswillring.com

Belles Will Ring are an Australian alternative-rock band based in Sydney. It consists of founding members and songwriters Liam Judson and Aidan Roberts; alongside multi-instrumentalist Lauren Crew and drummer Joe Driver. The band came to prominence when they released their debut album Mood Patterns in 2007 to critical acclaim.

The band formed in 2005 following the split of The Architects, a band which primary-school friends, Judson and Roberts, had been playing in since 2000. Following the split, Judson began recording his own material with Roberts and drummer Ivan Lisyak, and named the new band Belles Will Ring. The band has undergone a number of line-up changes since its inception, with Judson and Roberts remaining constant as the band's songwriters.

== History ==
Founding members Liam Judson and Aidan Roberts met in primary school in 1989, sharing a taste in similar musical styles including music from the 1950s, 1960s, 1970s, and hip-hop. They began making music together shortly after, and formed their first act in 1996, a duo named The Avenue. After recording one album with The Avenue, the pair formed a new band with Jon Hunter (The Holy Soul) in 1998, named Milton.

Following two independently released EPs with Milton; Judson and Roberts again moved on and formed the band The Architects in 2000, which also included Jon Hunter (guitar), Ivan Lisyak (drums) and Tim Batson (synthesizers). The Architects recorded and released three EPs including Shivers in The Dark (2004), which was released independently and distributed by Reverberation Records. In 2005, The Architects split up, after which Judson, Roberts and Lisyak formed a new band named Belles Will Ring.

Judson had recorded a three track demo with Roberts, composed of new songs written for Belles Will Ring. The pair enlisted Kent Williams (bass) and Jacqueline Schlender (keys and percussion) and played their first show with The Lovetones at Spectrum nightclub in Sydney, in late 2005. Soon after in 2006, the band were signed to independent record label Architecture, and began recording their debut album Mood Patterns.

In 2007, Belles Will Ring's debut album Mood Patterns was released to critical acclaim, and was followed by an extensive headline tour, as well as support shows for bands such as Broken Social Scene, Death Cab For Cutie and The Long Blondes. By the end that year the band had begun work on their follow-up album, but recording interruptions and Schlender's exit from the band led the band to suspend the recording sessions.

At the same time, Judson and Roberts had begun taking an interest in varying forms of instrumentation and songwriting. This newfound direction led to the release of Broader Than Broadway, a 7-song mini-album that was released in 2008. The band toured the album extensively to acclaim, until the departure of long-time drummer Ivan Lisyak later that year.

Soon after, long-time friend and drummer, Joe Driver, as well as multi-instrumentalist Lauren Crew, joined Belles Will Ring, and in 2009, Judson and Roberts began writing material for their second full-length album. After recording numerous demos, the band got together to make a selection of songs to record as a concept album, which was to become the band's widely acclaimed 2011 release, Crystal Theatre.

Belles Will Ring recorded Crystal Theatre from 2009 to 2010 on a borrowed property in NSW country town Oberon, and later continuing recording sessions in Portland. Preferring the isolation of the country, the band spent several weeks at these locations throughout 2010 tracking the sessions for Crystal Theatre. The album, named after an old movie house in Portland, was released in 2011 and received wide acclaim throughout Australia.

== Current members ==
Liam Judson	Songwriter, Guitars, Vocals
Aidan Roberts	Songwriter, Guitars, Vocals
Lauren Crew	Keys, Synth, Flute, Percussion, Vocals
Joe Driver	Drums, Percussion

== Discography ==
Year	Album
2011	Crystal Theatre (LP)
2010	Come to the Village (EP)
2008	Broader Than Broadway (EP)
2007	Mood Patterns (LP)
2006	Mad Love (EP)
