= We Have Secrets but Nobody Cares =

Album by Seja Vogel

We Have Secrets But Nobody Cares

Studio album by Seja Vogel
- Released: 26 March 2010
- Genres: electronica, rock
- Label: Rice Is Nice

We Have Secrets But Nobody Cares is the debut album from Brisbane singer and keyboardist Seja Vogel. The album was released in Australia on 27 March 2010 by Rice Is Nice and Other Tongues; and in the United States on 11 May 2010. Vogel used fourteen different analogue synthesizers on the album.

== Track listing ==
No.	Title	Length
1.	"I'll Get To You"
2.	"Through The Backstreets"
3.	"Framed You in Fiction"
4.	"Fire This Fuel Delay"
5.	"A Million Wheels"
6.	"One Year Later"
7.	"Sing Me The Song Like You Said"
8.	"Silver In My Eye"
9.	"We Can't See Past Our Hands"
10.	"We Begin"
11.	"Wir Haben Geheimnisse"
12.	"Between A Slur"

== Critical reception ==
Rave gave the album three and a half stars out of five, stating "there’s an op shop charm that permeates the record, not to mention a musical lightness of touch that proves nigh on irresistible". The Age described the album as containing "wonky, melancholy pop-songs".
