= SPOD (band) =

Australian indie electro band

Spod
- Origin: Ashfield, New South Wales, Australia
- Genres: Indie rock; electronica; electroclash; metal
- Years active: 1995–present
- Labels: Shock; Architecture
- Members: Spod (a.k.a. Brent Griffin)
- Past members: Mike Rickards; Andy Clockwise; Krylon; Axltronixxx; A-Blade
- Website: spod.com.au

Spod is an Australian indie, electro band, often styled as SPOD, which formed in 1995. It is also the pseudonym of the band's mainstay member, Brent Griffin, whether he is performing solo or with other members. They have released four albums, Taste the Radness (2003), Superfrenz (2008), Taste the Sadness (2014), and Adult Fantasy (2019).

== History ==
Spod was formed in Sydney as an indie, electro duo, first named Jizm, by Brent Griffin (later a.k.a. Spod) on guitar and keyboards, and Mike Rickards. They had attended the same secondary school. Griffin was a public servant in the New South Wales' Premier's Department and Rickards was a university student and sportsman.

Griffin and Richards shared a passion for Ween's "Push th' Little Daisies" (1993), Griffin later recalled, "we both confessed that we loved this 'Push Th' Little Daisies' song to each other – quite sheepishly, as everyone else reacted terribly to that news. From that moment, we clicked into a high gear, decided to borrow a four track from his uni, started looping Beastie Boys beats on my CD player."

In 1995 the duo changed their name to Spod, as an acronym for either Special Projects Organisational Division, Spinning Pizzas of Death, or Scorpion Powers of Destruction. Their recorded output was limited to home-made cassette tapes. In 1999 Andy Clockwise joined on drums and guitar and Rickards left. Griffin related how "I played some two piece shows with Andy, but put it on a back burner till I decided to keep writing songs by myself at Andy's insistence. This is what drove me to move into the solo version of SPOD. Mike and Andy were my biggest influences in making me want to create music the way I do."

On 5 October 2002 Spod headlined a concert at Thurles Castle in Chippendale. The drunk and the legless, a four-piece guitar-based rock group from Newtown, supported them. In September 2003 the group released their first album, Taste the Radness, via Architecture Label/Spod Music and distributed by Shock Records. Griffin explained the concept of Radness, "It's the beatz, it's the melodies, it's eternity, it's the diamonds that pour from rainbow drenched cloudz that house armies of unicornz that sing songz of luv and triumph, woe and hizeartbreak, p and tha izarty."

Jody Macgregor of AllMusic observed that its "mixture of electroclash, rock, and juvenilia found an audience, helped by energetic and anarchic live shows featuring the rest of the enigmatically named band." Taste the Radness included input from Spod's backup vocalists, dancers and choreographers, Krylon and A-Blade (collectively, the Scorpionz of Sex), specifically on the track, "2131 Ride Wit Me". This song was included on a 2004 edition of Australian Rolling Stone's cover CD New Sounds.

Following its release, Spod toured extensively, including a position on the Sydney leg of Big Day Out in 2004. As the year progressed, Spod began to augment his live line-up with members of the metal band, Black Level Embassy. This live set-up led to the release of an extended play, Eternal Championz, in September 2004. The EP included metal re-workings of their tracks, "Country of Sweden", "Secks Party 4 Eva" and "Makin' Party". "Nerdz" was played extensively on local radio stations, such as FBi Radio. The EP was recorded in the home of Regurgitator's Quan Yeomans. Spod and Regurgitator collaborated on joint gigs in 2004 (advertised as "ReSPODutator") and they were recorded as part of Regurgitator's project, Band in the Bubble, during that year.

In March 2007 Spod played at the annual South by Southwest festival, in Austin, Texas, It was the group's first performance outside Australia. Also in that year Spod and Yeomans formed a side project, Blox, which issued a six-track EP, Quan and Spod Present Blox (8 October 2007). Back in Sydney, Griffin was relocating to a new home when his laptop and two hard drives were damaged, "shattering his work and his dreams." He had been working on material for Spod's second album, Superfrenz (September 2008).

Dom Alessio of Mess+Noise described how "[he] started picking through the musical remains, discarding some songs, canvassing old and newly-created ones, and set about re-recording his whole album all over again." Alessio felt, "[it] is ultimately a positive party album. From the playful 'Cats!' to the hip-hop drum machine onslaught of 'Time Maggots Eating the Flesh of Destiny'. Griffin’s aim is to make you forget about the darker side of life and simply have fun."

Polaroids of Androids' Jonny attended Superfrenz' album launch where, "[his] music sounds damn fine on record, but it is still in a live setting that it comes alive, strips down to its boxer shorts (or Ruggers) and throws streamers everywhere in a celebration of 'who gives a fuck-ness'."

During 2010 Griffin joined Richard in Your Mind alongside Richard Cartwright, Jordy Lane, Pat Torres and Conrad Richters, which recorded the group's second album, My Volcano (September 2010). BMA Magazine's Katy Hall opined, "their unique blend of surf-pop and psychedelic lo-fi marks an important revival, one that not only seems to have gained gigantic momentum in recent times, but also one that clears through the often obscure genre-mixing styles of other bands of the moment." Spod reissued their first album as ''Taste the Radness: the 10 Years of Radness Edition in August 2013, with bonus material on a second disc.

The following year, Spod released Taste the Sadness (2014), an album that took the songs of Taste the Radness and reinvented them from the perspective of a person having a midlife crisis. Whereas the original album celebrated youthful partying and sexual excess, the updated album was about being weighed-down by the baggage of adulthood: mundane jobs, parenting, mediocre relationships. The Guardian's A.H. Cayley described Taste the Sadness as:

a song-by-song tonal flipside of his 2003 debut Taste The Radness, where his party boy character (“this big suburban dude thinking he’s a sex symbol”) is transposed into an unsuccessful later life, lonely and hated by his kids. The song "Letz Dance" becomes "Last Dance"; "Totally Rad" becomes "Totally Sad"; and "F**k Yeah!!" becomes "Hell No".

Jasmine Crittenden of Concrete Playground noticed, "SPOD's getting old. And slightly blue on occasion. And he's not afraid to admit it. Back in the early noughties, he thought that happiness was all about aiming champagne corks at innocent bystanders, tossing streamers around and cranking the odd slow-grind. But the combo just isn't cutting the mustard these days." She felt the album, "tells the story of rushing headfirst into the autumn of existence as though you were still a spring chicken, only to dislocate your hip and find yourself in an ultra cosy armchair. From that vantage point, you spend your time telling the world how much better everything was when you were able to enjoy it more." It was issued via Rice Is Nice Records and according to FasterLouder's Darren Levin, "[he] has decided to quit being a 'computer deadshit' and record a real-life album with real-life instruments in a real-life studio with real-life producer Owen Penglis (The Straight Arrows)."

Spod issued a single, "Boys Night", in December 2016.

== Discography ==
=== Albums ===
- Taste the Radness (29 September 2003) – Architecture Label/Shock Records
  - Taste the Radness: the 10 Years of Radness Edition (expanded version, 22 August 2013) – Rice Is Nice Records
- Superfrenz (22 September 2008) – Rice Is Nice/MGM (MGM V102)
- Taste the Sadness (22 August 2014) – Rice Is Nice
- Adult Fantasy (19 July 2019) – Rice Is Nice

=== Extended plays ===
- Eternal Championz (September 2004) – Shock Records
- Quan and Spod Present Blox (by Blox) (6 October 2007) – Valve Records
- Animals (1 June 2008) – Rice Is Nice (RIN001)

=== Singles ===
- "Couple of Drinks" (11 September 2012) – Rice Is Nice
- "Party of One" (29 July 2016) – Rice is Nice
- "Boys Night" (16 December 2016) – Rice is Nice
- "Day in the Sun" (20 April 2018) – Rice is Nice
- ''Becomes a Wife'' (19 July 2019)- Rice is Nice
- "Lockdown" (16 July 2021) – Rice is Nice
