= Last Leaves =

Australian musical group

- Origin: Melbourne, Australia
- Genres: Indie pop
- Years active: 2012–present
- Members: Marty Donald; Noah Symons; Mark Monnone; Louis Richter

Last Leaves are an Australian indie pop band from Melbourne, Australia, made up of three-quarters of the members of defunct and well-known Melbourne band The Lucksmiths. Their songs feature the familiar lyrical wit and themes of nature and 'every-day' Australian life of The Lucksmiths' music (albeit with less of a focus on inner city living and more of a rural slant), but their sound is notably heavier and less jangly. Songwriter Marty Donald has described the new sound as being "more expansive and dynamic".

The band are signed to the Melbourne-based label Lost and Lonesome, which is run by their bassist, Mark Monnone. They began performing in various Australian locations in March 2012, including several gigs supporting international act The Wedding Present during their April 2012 tour of Australia.

Their debut album Other Towns Than Ours was released in 2017, a co-release from Lost and Lonesome and Matinée Recordings.
