= First Frost =

Studio album by The Lucksmiths
- Released: 2008
- Genre: Indie pop
- Length: 54:15

The Lucksmiths chronology
| Warmer Corners (2005) | First Frost (2008) |

Professional ratings
Review scores
| Source | Rating |
|---|---|
| AllMusic | 4/5 stars |
| JustPressplay | 8/10 stars |
| Pitchfork | 7.6/10 stars |

First Frost is the eleventh album release and ninth and final studio album by the Lucksmiths released in October 2008.

== Recording ==
Donald described the recording as one of his favourite moments with the band. "We managed to make it through eight solid days with only each other and the producer for company, and had such a fantastic time making that album. We stayed together in a really beautiful spot out in Tasmania."

== Track listing ==
1. "The Town & The Hills" – 4:06
2. "Good Light" – 2:50
3. "A Sobering Thought (Just When One Was Needed)" – 4:54
4. "California in Popular Song" – 3:52
5. "South-East Coastal Rendezvous" – 3:50
6. "The National Mitten Registry" – 4:19
7. "Day Three of Five" – 3:17
8. "Never & Always" – 2:50
9. "Lament of the Chiming Wedgebill" – 3:48
10. "How We Met" – 5:15
11. "Song of the Undersea" – 3:28
12. "Up With the Son" – 3:03
13. "Pines" – 4:56
14. "Who Turned on the Lights?" – 3:47
