= So Many Dynamos =

American rock band

- Origin: St. Louis
- Genres: Indie rock, dance-punk, electropop, math rock
- Years active: 2002–2023
- Labels: Ambivalent, Skrocki, Discos Mariscos, Hello Sir, Vagrant
- Past members: Aaron Stovall; Clayton "Norm" Kunstel; Travis Lewis; Nathan Bernaix; Alison Arida; Griffin Kay; Ryan Wasoba; Ryan Ballew
- Website: www.dynamos-music.com

So Many Dynamos was a rock band from St. Louis, Missouri. Their music was generally classified as indie rock, combining aspects of electropop, math rock, and dance-punk. They took their name from a famous palindrome.

== History ==
The band's first recording, a five-song EP entitled Are We Not Drawn Onward to New Era?, was released by now-defunct St. Louis label Ambivalent Records in 2003. The album was recorded by John John (John Katsafanas) at Red Light Studios in St. Louis. Like the band's name, the title of the EP is also a palindrome.

So Many Dynamos recorded their first full-length, When I Explode, in February 2004 at Semaphore Studios in Chicago, Illinois. The album was recorded onto 2" tape by Jeremy Lemos and was mixed on 1/2" tape by former Dismemberment Plan member Jason Caddell at Inner Ear Studios in Arlington, Virginia. When I Explode was released by Skrocki Records in June 2004. Shortly thereafter, guitarist Ryan Ballew quit the group. Griffin Kay joined on as guitarist in September 2004.

In February 2005, the band recorded "It's Gonna Rain" for a split 7-inch single with Bring Back the Guns. The song was recorded and mixed on 1" tape by Chris Deckard at Radio Penny Studio in St. Louis. The band spent most of 2005 touring, attempting to play all of the 48 contiguous states within the year, but ultimately only playing in 35. In October 2005, So Many Dynamos began playing as the touring band for Emperor X, a solo project of Chad Matheny. In December 2005, Matheny released the "So Many Dynamos"/"Bring Back the Guns" split 7-inch on his label, Discos Mariscos.

So Many Dynamos began recording their second full-length album, Flashlights, with Chris Deckard at Radio Penny in March 2006. The band spent more time in the studio than with When I Explode, and consequently was able to experiment wildly with instrumentation; the record utilizes a horn section and a choir, and incorporates instruments such as thumb pianos and toy accordions. This resulted in a more intricate and "live" sounding record, expanding on the band's existing sound. Flashlights was released on CD by Skrocki Records in June 2006, and Hello Sir Records released the vinyl in early 2007. Architecture Label released the CD in Australia and New Zealand in June 2007.

In July 2007, So Many Dynamos began recording their third full-length, The Loud Wars, with Christopher Walla. Sessions took place at Tiny Telephone Studios in San Francisco, Alberta Court in Portland, and the band's house in Edwardsville, Illinois. The record was mixed by Alex Newport at Metropolitan Sound, Brooklyn, New York, in December 2007. The band recorded another track for the album in February 2008 at Great Western Records Recording in Champaign, Illinois. This track was mixed by Alex Newport in May 2008. The Loud Wars was released by Vagrant Records on June 9, 2009 and on vinyl by Hello Sir Records in 2010.

On August 25, 2009, Ryan Wasoba announced he was leaving the band. Nathan Bernaix, of St. Louis band Target Market, took his place as guitarist.

In March 2010, UK label Hassle Records released The Loud Wars and the band embarked on a tour of the UK and Eastern Europe.

On June 10, 2011, Griffin Kay announced he would be leaving the band. After a final performance in St. Louis on July 30, Travis Lewis would become the newest member and take over as the band's guitarist.

On June 26, 2012, So Many Dynamos self-released a digital-only EP in the form of a refrigerator magnet, designed by The Bungaloo.

On November 13, 2015, the band released their final full-length album "Safe With Sound".

On August 9, 2023, the band released their final single "Consider the Past" on most streaming platforms.

The band played their final show on August 12, 2023 at Delmar Hall in St. Louis, MO. It involved all iterations of the bands through the years.

== Members ==
Former

- Aaron Stovall - vocals, keyboard, percussion, guitar (2002–2023)
- Clayton "Norm" Kunstel - drums, percussion, keyboard (2002–2023)
- Nathan Bernaix - guitar, vocals, keyboard (2009–2023)
- Alison Arida - Drumkat, percussion, vocals (2013–2023)
- Stephen Inman - guitar, keyboards, percussion, vocals (2013–2023)
- Travis Lewis - guitar, keyboards (2011-2013, 2023)
- Griffin Kay - guitar, vocals (2004–2011, 2023)
- Ryan Wasoba - guitar, vocals, keyboard (2002–2009, 2023)
- Ryan Ballew - guitar, vocals (2002–2004, 2023)

== Discography ==
Name	Year	Format	Label
Are We Not Drawn Onward to New Era?	2003	CD-EP	Ambivalent Records
When I Explode	2004	CD	Skrocki Records
So Many Dynamos/Bring Back the Guns split	2005	7-inch	Discos Mariscos
Flashlights	2006	CD	Skrocki Records
The Loud Wars	2009	CD	Vagrant
New Bones (single)	2009	7-inch	Vagrant
Self-Titled EP	2012	Digital Download Refrigerator Magnet	Self-Released
Safe With Sound	2015	CD	Self-Released
Consider the Past	2023	Digital Streaming Single	Self-Released
