= Architecture Label =

Australian record label

- Founded: 2002
- Founder: Stefan Zagorski
- Distributor(s): Shock Records
- Genre: Various
- Country of origin: Australia
- Location: Camperdown, New South Wales
- Official website: Architecture Label

Architecture Label is an independent record label based in Sydney, Australia. It is managed by Stefan Zagorski and is the Australian label for Death Cab for Cutie.

== Artists with releases on Architecture ==
- Belles Will Ring
- Bit By Bats
- Death Cab for Cutie
- Pedro the Lion
- School of Emotional Engineering
- So Many Dynamos
- Sounds Like Sunset
- Spod

== See also ==
- List of record labels
