= Where Were We? (album) =

Compilation album by The Lucksmiths
- Released: 2002
- Genre: Indie pop
- Length: 41:53
- Label: Candle

The Lucksmiths chronology
Why That Doesn't Surprise Me (2001)	Where Were We? (2002)	Naturaliste (2003)

Professional ratings
Review scores
Source	Rating
AllMusic	4/5 stars

Where Were We? is the seventh album by The Lucksmiths released in 2002 on Candle Records (catalog number CAN2521.) It is a compilation of tracks released between 1999 and 2001.

== Track listing ==
1. "The Cassingle Revival" – 3:17
2. "Myopic Friends" – 1:52
3. "A Downside to the Upstairs" – 3:35
4. "Can't Believe My Eyes" – 3:01
5. "I Prefer the Twentieth Century" – 2:58
6. "T-Shirt Weather' – 2:44
7. "Tmrw Vs. Y'day" – 3:07
8. "Southernmost" – 2:39
9. "Even Stevens" – 2:29
10. "The Great Dividing Range" (demo) – 3:20
11. "Friendless Summer" – 4:11
12. "Goodness Gracious" – 2:24
13. "Welcome Home" – 1:54
14. "Mars" – 4:22
