= Hieronymous (song) =

1991 single by the Clouds

"Hieronymus"

Single by the Clouds

from the album Penny Century
- A-side: "Lucy's Eyes"
- Released: September 1991
- Genre: Rock
- Label: Red Eye
- Songwriter: Jodi Phillis
- Producer: Tim Whitten

The Clouds singles chronology
"Hieronymus" (1991)	"Anthem" (1992)

"Hieronymous" is a song by Australian rock band the Clouds. It was released in September 1991 as the band's debut and lead single from their first studio album, Penny Century. The single peaked at number 45 on the Australian ARIA Singles Chart as a double-A side with "Lucy's Eyes".

== Reception ==
Rolling Stone Australia said the, "habit-forming track" was, "powered by an unusual sequence of chords, which evokes the horrid fascination Bosch's paintings can provoke".

In an article on The 50 best Australian songs of the 90s, radio station Double J, ranked the song at number 4 saying, "The honeyed harmonies of Jodi Phillis and Trish Young set against their lyrics of 'eyes in the trees', 'the devil howl' and 'beds of nails' made them conspirators to something a little frightening and unseen. They set themselves apart from the rest of the 90s crop with indie rock that fused the sweet and the sinister." Singer Adalita said, "Everyone loved 'Hieronymus'. It's just such a classic song, so beautifully crafted and so original and unique. I still listen to it today! One of my all-time favourite songs ever!"

== Track listing ==
CD and 7-inch single (867690-2/867690-7)

1. "Hieronymus" – 3:50
2. "Lucy's Eyes" – 2:49

== Charts ==
Chart (1991)	Peak position
Australia (ARIA)	45
