= The Clouds (Australian band) =

Australian indie rock band

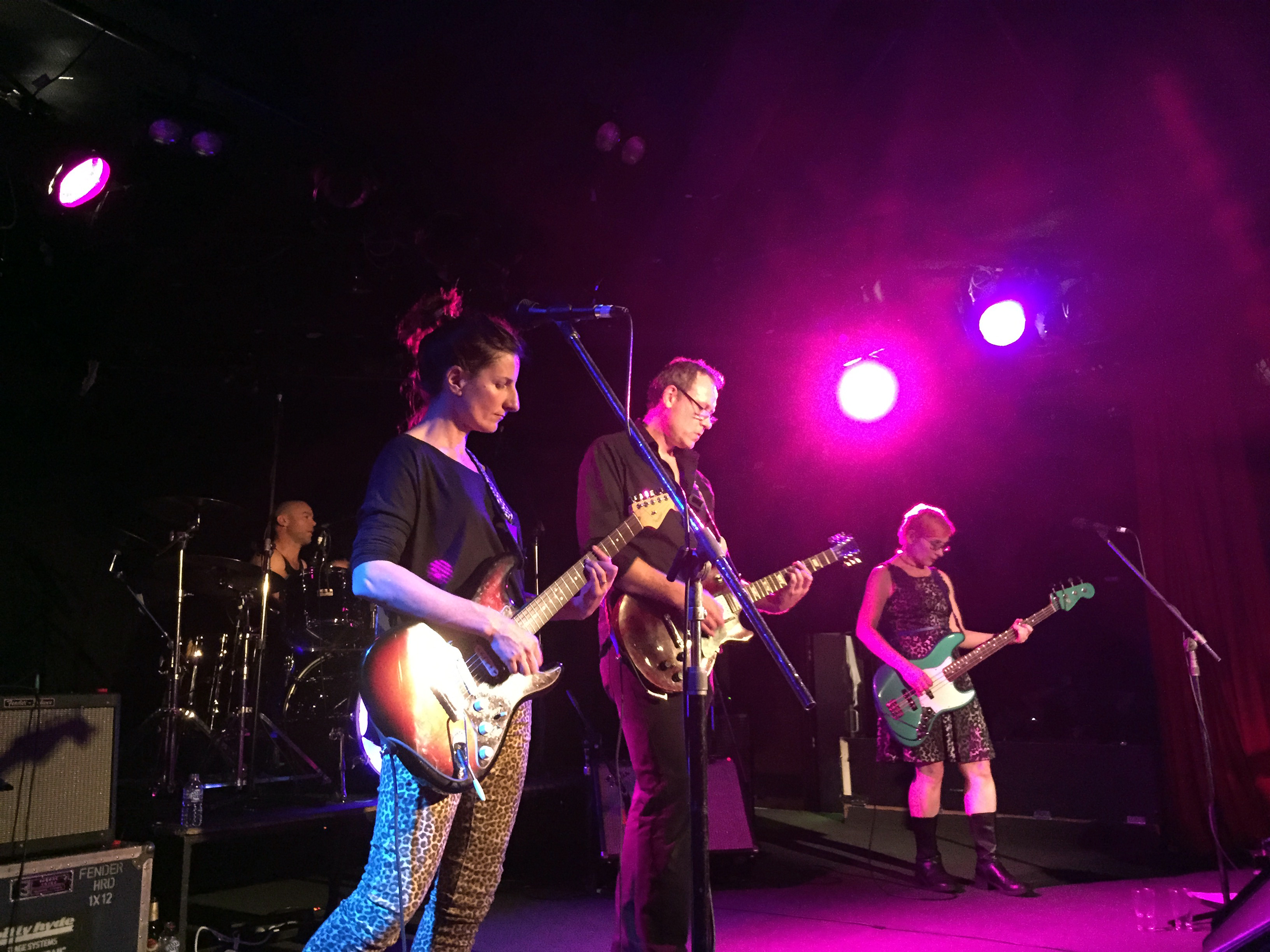
- The Clouds performing at The Corner Hotel, Melbourne in 2014

Background information
- Also known as: Clouds
- Origin: Sydney, Australia
- Genres: Indie rock
- Years active: 1989–1997, 2011–present
- Labels: Red Eye Records; Elektra Records (USA)
- Members: Jodi Phillis (guitar, vocals); Trish Young (bass, vocals); David Easton (guitar); Raphael Whittingham (drums)
- Past members: Robert Phelan (guitar); Stuart Eadie (drums); Andrew Byrnes (drums); Ben Nightingale (guitar)

The Clouds (also called just Clouds) are an indie rock band from Sydney, Australia formed in December 1989. The core of the group consisted of frontwomen Jodi Phillis (guitar and vocals) and Patricia "Trish" Young (bass and vocals). The line-up of The Clouds has changed several times with different drummers and lead guitarists. The Clouds' music is distinguished by rapid and unusual chord changes, creative bass guitar, and Phillis and Young's vocal harmonies. They released 4 albums and numerous EPs and singles before breaking up in 1997. They reformed in 2011.

== History ==
=== 1989–1993: Penny Century, Octopus & Thunderhead ===
The Clouds were one of Australia's most promising acts in the late 1980s and early 1990s, along with other up-and-comers like Ratcat, Falling Joys, Tall Tales and True and The Hummingbirds.

The Clouds secured a recording contract with Red Eye Records in 1990 and began recording their debut EP in May which was released in October, titled Cloud Factory. The EP peaked at number 118 on the ARIA charts In April 1991, they released the EP Loot, featuring the song "Soul Eater". Loot peaked at number 22 on the ARIA chart.

In mid 1991, recording for the Penny Century album began. The album was released in October 1991, and peaked at number 23 on the ARIA Chart. It spawned the singles "Hieronymous" and "Anthem".

In September 1992, the band released "Say It", the lead single from their second studio album Octopus which was released in October 1992. Octopus peaked at number 24 on the ARIA charts.

In June 1993, recording began on the third album, Thunderhead. The lead single "Bower of Bliss" was released in August. Thunderhead was released in October, and peaked at number 30 on the ARIA chart. The second single, "Alchemy's Dead" was released in December.

=== 1994–1999: Futura and break up ===
In 1994, Clouds took a six-month tour to Europe and the United States, securing an American record deal with Elektra Records. Whilst in London the EP Beetroot was recorded. It was released in Australia in October 1994 and peaked at number 65 on the ARIA chart.

Following the signing with Elektra Records Thunderhead was released in the United States in March 1995 along with numerous promotional singles. However, shortly after these releases The Clouds were dumped by Elektra. Despite this setback, recording of new songs continued and two singles were released in 1995, "Aquamarine" and "Panel Van" in August and November 1995, respectively.

In May 1996, Red Eye Records released a re-released Penny Century which included a limited edition bonus CD of early songs called Pre-Raphaelite. This helped the album to reach gold accreditation in Australia (35,000 copies sold).

In November 1996, the band released their fourth studio album Futura which peaked at number 50 on the ARIA chart. The group eventually disbanded in 1997.

In 1999, the compilation album Favourites was released.

=== 2000–present: reformation ===
Although Phillis was living in a small town in Tasmania and Young was living in London, the two occasionally reunited over the years to perform a few shows. Phillis went on to form The Dearhunters and Roger Loves Betty, and also records and performs as a solo artist.

In late 2005, Phillis and Young resurfaced under the name The Girls from the Clouds, releasing a 5-track EP titled Lalalala. In April 2007, however, the duo announced they had disbanded again.

The Clouds reunited to tour with Jesus Jones and The Wonder Stuff in August 2011. In late 2011 and early 2012, the band toured Australia in The Clouds Reunion Tour.

In February 2017, The Clouds released a new song, "Mabel's Bookshop" from an EP Zaffre, their first new music in 20 years. Two more songs followed in 2017 and 2019.

They toured at the 2017 The Day on the Green with Blondie and Cyndi Lauper.

In December 2022, The Clouds toured in commemoration of the 30th anniversary of Penny Century. They toured again in 2025.

== Members ==
- Jodi Phillis – guitar, vocals (1989–1997, 2005–2006, (Note: As The Girls From The Clouds) 2011–present)
- Trish Young – bass, vocals (1989–1997, 2005–2006, 2011–present)
- Robert Phelan – guitar (1989–1990)
- Stuart Eadie – drums (1989–1991)
- Dave Easton – guitar (1990–1996, 2011–present)
- Andrew Byrne – drums (1992)
- Raphael Whittingham – drums (1993–1997, 2011–present)
- Ben Nightingale – guitar (1996–1997)

== Discography ==
=== Studio albums ===
List of studio albums, with selected chart positions and certifications
Title	Album details	Peak chart positions		Certifications
Title	Album details	AUS	US CMJ	Certifications
Penny Century	Released: October 1991; Label: Red Eye Records, Polydor (511398–2); Formats: CD, LP, Cassette	23	-	ARIA: Gold
Octopus	Released: October 1992; Label: Red Eye Records, Polydor (517089–2); Formats: CD, Cassette	24	-	
Thunderhead	Released: October 1993; Label: Red Eye Records, Polydor (521148–2); Formats: CD, Cassette	30	31	
Futura	Released: November 1996; Label: Red Eye Records, Polydor (527983–2); Formats: CD	50	-	

=== Compilation albums ===
List of compilation albums, with selected chart positions
Title	Album details	Peak chart positions
Title	Album details	AUS
Collage	Released: 1996 (US Only); Label: Altered Records (ALT 3114–2); Formats: CD; Notes: EP tracks and demos recorded between 1991 and 1995.	—N/a
Favourites	Released: September 1999; Label: Red Eye Records, Universal (547911–2); Formats: 2x CD	181

=== Extended plays ===
List of extended plays, with selected chart positions
Title	Extended play details	Peak chart positions
Title	Extended play details	AUS
Cloud Factory	Released: October 1990; Label: Red Eye Records, Polydor (877772–2); Formats: CD, 2x7" LP, Cassette	118
Loot	Released: April 1991; Label: Red Eye Records, Polydor (879855–2); Formats: CD, LP, Cassette	22
Beetroot	Released: November 1994; Label: Red Eye Records, Polydor (853997–2); Formats: CD, Cassette	65
Aquamarine	Released: August 1995; Label: Red Eye Records, Polydor (853997–2); Formats: CD	-
Panel Van	Released: November 1995; Label: Red Eye Records, Polydor (853997–2); Formats: CD, Cassette	72
Zaffre	Released: February 2017; Label: The Clouds; Formats: DD, streaming	-

=== Singles ===
List of singles, with selected chart positions and certifications
Title	Year	Peak chart positions		Album
Title	Year	AUS	US CMJ	Album
"Hieronymus"/"Lucy's Eyes"	1991	45	-	Penny Century
"Anthem"	1992	47	-	Penny Century
"Say It"	1992	56	-	Octopus
"Bower of Bliss"	1993	69	122	Thunderhead
"Alchemy's Dead"	1993	125	-	Thunderhead
"Boy of Air"	1994	-	-	Beetroot EP
"Panel Van"	1995	118	-	Panel Van EP
"Aquamarine"	1995	-	-	Aquamarine EP
"Here Now"/"Down from the Sky"	1996	113	-	Futura
"Never Say Forever"	1997	162	-	Futura
"Mabel's Bookshop"	2017	-	-	Zaffre
"Beautiful Nothingness"	2017	-	-	Non Album Single
"Check Us Out"	2019	-	-	Non Album Single

== Awards and nominations ==
=== ARIA Music Awards ===
The ARIA Music Awards is an annual awards ceremony that recognises excellence, innovation, and achievement across all genres of Australian music. They commenced in 1987.

Year	Nominee / work	Award	Result	Ref.
1992	Penny Century	Breakthrough Artist - Album	Nominated	
1994	Thunderhead	Best Adult Alternative Album	Nominated	
