= Boondoggle (EP) =

EP by The Lucksmiths
- Released: 1 October 1994
- Genre: Indie pop
- Label: Candle

The Lucksmiths chronology
First Tape (1994)	Boondoggle (1994)	The Green Bicycle Case (1995)

Professional ratings
Review scores
Source	Rating
AllMusic	4/5 stars

Boondoggle is an EP from The Lucksmiths released in 1994 on Candle Records (catalogue number LUCKY1.)

== Track listing ==
1. "Victor Trumper" - 2:03
2. "Clever Hans" - 4:43
3. "Summer Town" - 3:52
4. "Tree" - 2:41
5. "21" - 5:08
6. "Umbrella" - 2:38
7. "The Bakers Wife" - 0:58
8. "Fridge Magnet Song" - 2:07
