= Penny Century (The Clouds album) =

Studio album by the Clouds
- Released: October 1991
- Recorded: June–July 1991
- Studio: Megaphon Studios, Sydney
- Label: Red Eye / Polydor Records
- Producer: Tim Whitten

The Clouds chronology
Penny Century (1991)	Octopus (1992)

Singles from Penny Century
- 1. "Hieronymous"/"Lucy's Eyes" Released: September 1991; 2. "Anthem" Released: February 1992

Penny Century is the debut studio album by Australian indie rock band the Clouds. The album was released in October 1991 and peaked at number 23 on the Australian ARIA Charts. Following a re-release, the album was certified gold in Australia in 1996.

== Reception ==
In The Sell-In, Craig Mathieson said the album was, "proof not only that Clouds could last the distance but that they ability to render depth and mystery into an accessible structure. Obvious on first listenings was the crispness of the drums and the razor-sharp talons of Easton's guitar work. Clouds were not only assured but great fun."

== Track listing ==
Penny Century track listing
No.	Title	Writer(s)	Length
1.	"Hieronymus"	Jodi Phillis	3:47
2.	"Immorta"	Trish Young	3:10
3.	"Fear the Moon"	Young	2:36
4.	"Pocket"	Phillis	2:21
5.	"Soul Eater"	Phillis	2:38
6.	"Too Cool"	Stuart Eadie, Phillis	3:21
7.	"Visionary"	Paul McNeil, Phillis	2:43
8.	"Show Me"	Young	3:52
9.	"Maybe"	Phillis	5:07
10.	"Little Death"	Young	3:17
11.	"Foxes Wedding"	Phillis	2:13
12.	"Anthem"	Young	2:13
13.	"Fantastic Tear"	Phillis	3:24
14.	"Wednesday Night"	Phillis	3:16

Pre-Raphaelite (1996 bonus disc)
No.	Title	Length
1.	"Anaesthesia" (from the Cloud Factory EP)	4:12
2.	"Cloud Factory" (from the Cloud Factory EP)	3:48
3.	"Renee's Problems" (from the Cloud Factory EP)	5:55
4.	"Dive" (from the Cloud Factory EP)	3:57
5.	"Heartless" (from the Loot EP)	3:58
6.	"Sweetest Thing" (from the Loot EP)	2:53
7.	"4pm" (from the Loot EP)	2:33
8.	"White Girl" (b-side to "Say It")	3:29
9.	"Lucy's Eyes" (double-A sided single with "Hieronymous")	2:51
10.	"For a Few Bucks More" (b-side to "Anthem")	2:32
11.	"Tear Me Apart" (b-side to "Anthem")	2:57
12.	"Swim" (b-side to "Anthem")	3:43
13.	"Eemush" (b-side to "Anthem")	1:59

== Charts ==
Chart (1991)	Peak position
Australian Albums (ARIA)	23

== Certification ==
Region	Certification	Certified units/sales
Australia (ARIA)	Gold	35,000^{^}
^{^} Shipments figures based on certification alone.

== Personnel ==
- Stuart Eadie – drums
- David Easton – guitar
- Jodi Phillis – guitar, vocals
- Patricia Young – bass, vocals

== Release history ==
Region	Date	Format	Label	Catalogue
Australia	October 1991	LP; Cassette; CD	Red Eye Records / Polydor Records	511398-1
Europe	1992	CD	Red Eye Records / Polydor Records	517967-2
Australia	1996	2xCD	Red Eye Records / Polydor Records	531655-2
