= The Lucksmiths =

Australian indie pop band

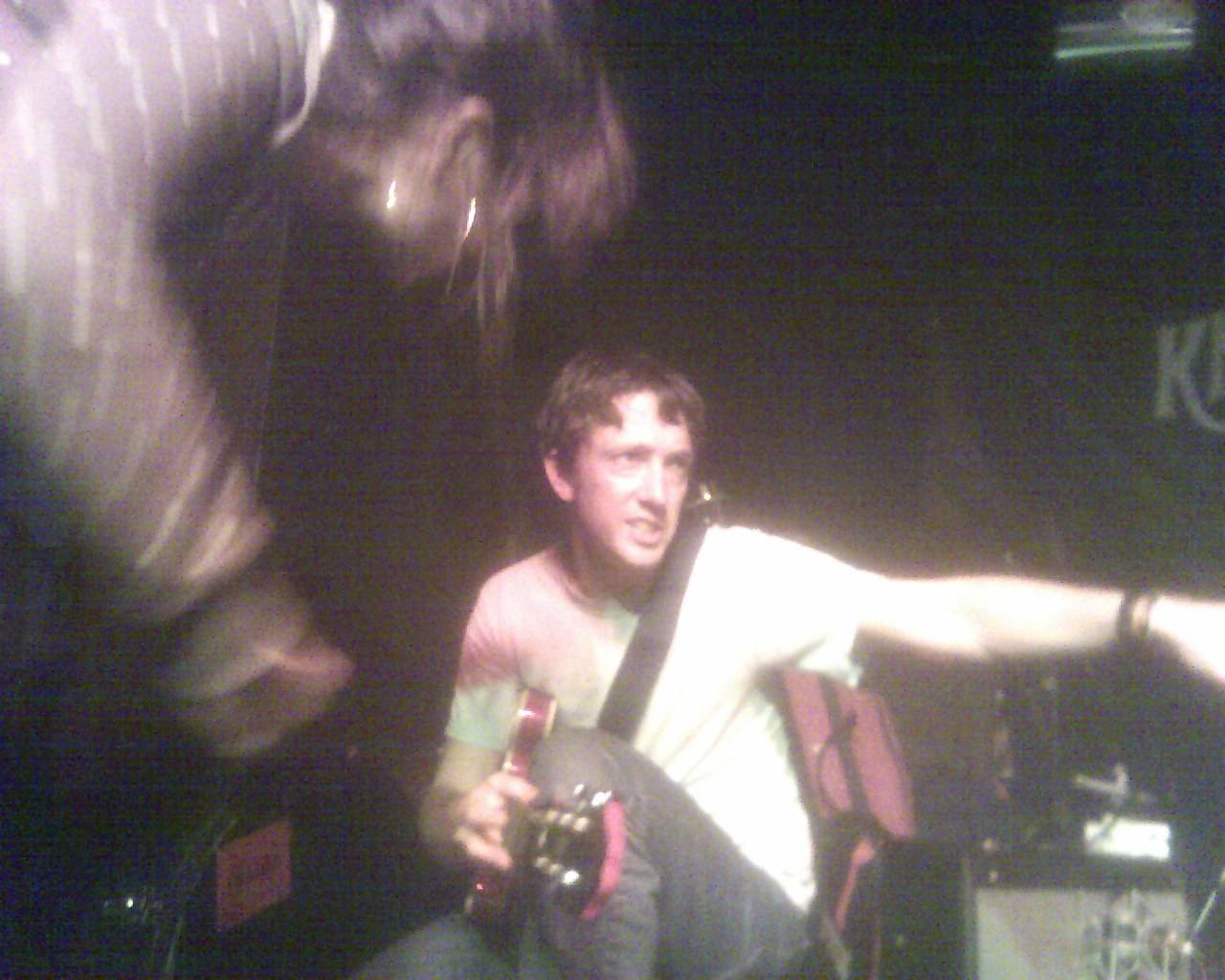
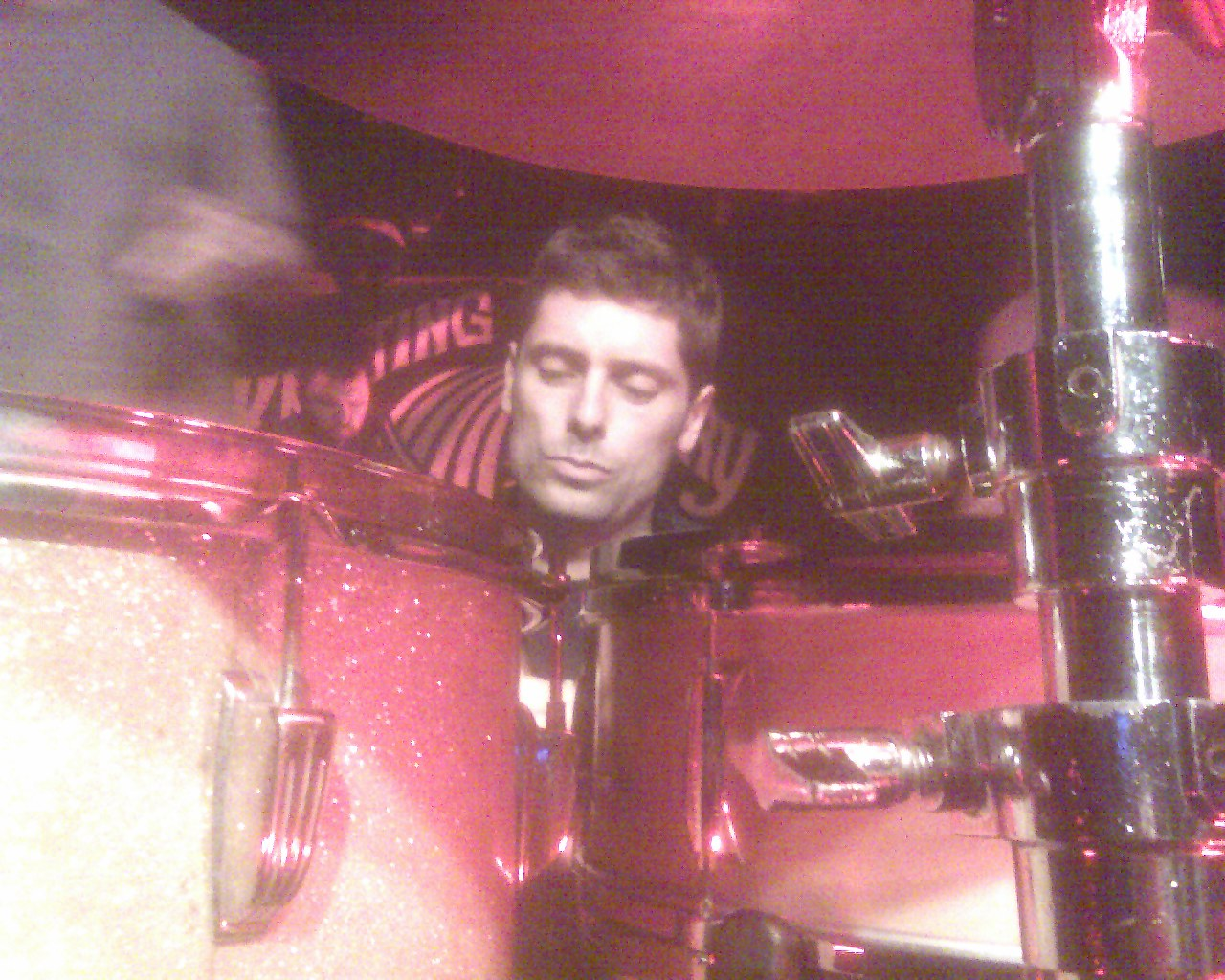
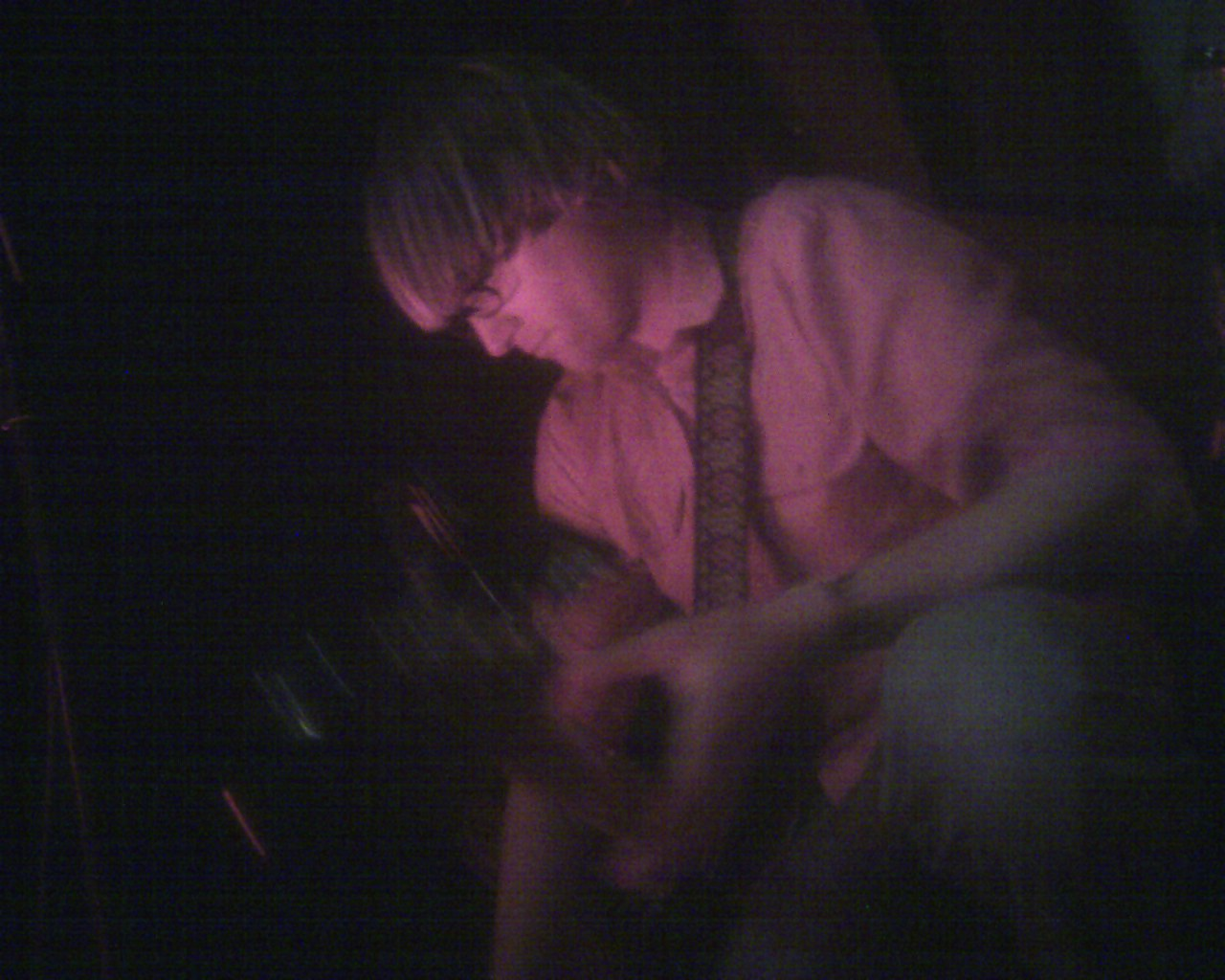
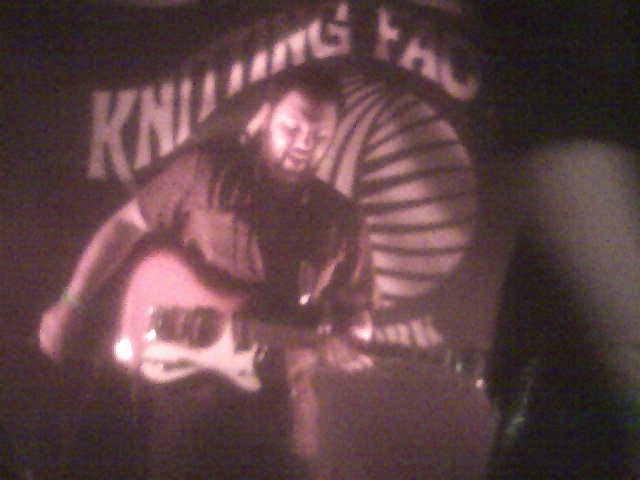
- Marty Donald Tali White Mark Monnone Louis Richter The Lucksmiths, Knitting Factory, New York City, September 2007

Background information
- Origin: Melbourne, Victoria, Australia
- Genre: Indie pop
- Years active: 1993–2009
- Label: Candle/MGM
- Past members: Marty Donald; Mark Monnone; Tali White; Louis Richter

The Lucksmiths were an Australian indie pop band formed in March 1993 by Marty Donald on guitar, Mark Monnone on bass guitar and Tali White on drums and lead vocals. Louis Richter (ex-Mid State Orange) joined on guitar in 2005. They released eight studio albums, First Tape (1 September 1993), The Green Bicycle Case (July 1995), What Bird Is That? (September 1996), A Good Kind of Nervous (1997), Why That Doesn't Surprise Me (5 March 2001), Naturaliste (10 March 2003), Warmer Corners (4 April 2005) and First Frost (2008), before disbanding in August 2009.

== History ==
The Lucksmiths were formed in March 1993 in Melbourne as an indie pop band by guitarist Marty Donald, bass player Mark Monnone, and drummer-vocalist Tali White, who were all high school friends. Both Donald and Monnone were members of a school boys band, The Buzzards, "sharing a love for the Cowboy Junkies, The Rolling Stones and Billy Bragg." Soon after White joined and the group practised at Donald's home. Donald and White began writing songs together while the Buzzards disbanded and Monnone travelled to visit Finland.

The trio reconvened as the Lucksmiths in March 1993, their first gig was on 2 April of that year, "supporting The Sugargliders and The Daily Planets at the Evelyn [Hotel] in Fitzroy." Their debut album, First Tape (1 September 1993), appeared on a cassette. It was recorded on 22 August 1993 by Rex Hardware at the Bridge Mall Inn in Ballarat. Aside from regular drums and lead vocals, White also provided harmonica and tambourine. AllMusic's Ned Raggett noticed "the charm of the group is captured in a brisk and simple way... White's lovely voice, direct and warm with Australian accent perfectly audible, somehow just beautifully suggests a certain winsome attitude without calling to mind all the stereotypes of twee indie: conversational instead of self-pitying, wryly observant instead of smirkily pithy."

In October 1994 they issued an eight-track extended play, Boondoggle, as one of the first by new label, Candle Records. Raggett described it as an "enjoyable romp... with the band again performing like they have a bunch of happy ants in their collective pants... [and] the group's upbeat and thoroughly enjoyable music galloping along." The tracks were recorded by Dave Nelson in May–June 1994 at his Nelsonics studio in Kew. Guest musicians, generally for one track each, were Bob Donald on voice, cello by Michael Smallwood, lead vocals by Kirsty Stegwazi, Breather Hole on brass, and Tom Jackman on drums (for two tracks).

In March–April 1995 the Lucksmiths worked on their second studio album, The Green Bicycle Case, at Happy Valley studios, North Fitzroy with Mark Adams recording. It appeared in the following July, which Raggett felt "again showcases the band's virtue for getting things done without wasting time – 12 songs in just over half an hour, nearly all of them winners." At the One Album a Day website the reviewer stated that the "trio get all olde skool with a Thomas Hardy-inspired tale of public hangings (with a nifty waltz backing, and recorder solo no less!), some Hiroshima action, more aviator action, a Roald Dahl paean ('William and Mary') and the thorny old 'Tichbourne Claimant'."

On 20 March 1996 they performed on the RMITV show, Under Melbourne Tonight, "Episode 2", season 1 on Channel 31. The group's third studio album, What Bird Is That? was recorded in a house at Shoreham Beach over two consecutive weekends in August that year with Adams producing, again. It appeared in the following month, One Album a Day reviewer felt that initially "the quirkier and difficult-to-play-live tracks tended to get the most attention" while later the "big inner suburban indiepop gems that shine now. Track after track on here could form the soundtrack for a series of montages in some low-budget, slacker fest."

Later Lucksmiths albums and EPs were released on Drive-In Records (Later Microindie Records) and Matinée Recordings in the United States, Fortuna Pop! in the United Kingdom, Clover Records in Japan, and Boompa! Records in Canada.

The band were expanded to a four-piece when Mid State Orange guitarist Louis Richter joined for the recording of the album Warmer Corners in 2005. (Louis is also the son of prominent criminal defence barrister Robert Richter.) Following the closure of Candle Records in 2007 The Lucksmiths moved to Melbourne-based label Lost & Lonesome for their last album, First Frost, which the Belfast Telegraph selected as its CD of the Week.

Despite cultivating a sizable following both in Australia and abroad, particularly in Europe, the Lucksmiths disbanded in 2009 after a series of performances in Europe and Australia. Their last concert was on 29 August 2009 at the Corner Hotel, Melbourne. They were supported by sometime touring and studio session member, Darren Hanlon.

In 2012, three of the former Lucksmiths, Marty Donald, Mark Monnone and Louis Richter, announced the formation of their new band Last Leaves, also including Melbourne musician Noah Symons on drums. The final ex-Lucksmith, Tali White, continues to work with his other band, The Guild League.

In 2011, a policeman in England was accused of intentionally inserting the title of one of their songs ("Self Preservation") into an official report concerning a murder.

== Musical style ==
The Lucksmiths' music can best be described as indie pop, although some consider them more specifically a twee pop band. The majority of songs were written by Marty Donald, although White and Monnone also contributed songs. Songs by the Lucksmiths are mostly about love and relationships, but also deal with other everyday issues such as notable friends or warm weather. There are also recurring themes of Melbourne culture, especially that of the inner city, in songs such as "Under the Rotunda", "The Sandringham Line" and "Transpontine". Australian rules football is referenced in many of their songs.

The Lucksmiths were renowned for their creative and witty use of language. The Canberra Times has referred to their music as "literate, gloriously melodic pop," with lyrics "rife with puns and wordplay." The Hobart Mercury called them "fiercely independent and refreshingly unique". In songs written by Marty Donald, lyrics often feature puns, wordplays and draw upon literary references or Australian English idioms. The themes of weather, geography, and seasons appear often in the songs of the Lucksmiths.

Some of the band's influences included The Simpletons, Billy Bragg, The Housemartins, The Magnetic Fields, Belle & Sebastian, The Smiths, The Go-Betweens, Aztec Camera, Lloyd Cole, Orange Juice, and The Trash Can Sinatras.

== Members ==
- Marty Donald – guitar, banjo, vocals, photography, layout design (1993–2009)
- Mark Monnone – bass guitar, drums, guitar, melodica, pump organ, harmonium, vocals, string arrangements, percussion, engineer (1993–2009)
- Tali White – drums, lead vocals, percussion, recorder, bodhran, harmonica, organ, synthesiser, vibraphone, piano, tin whistle, photography (1993–2009)
- Louis Richter – guitar, banjo, organ, piano (electric), vocals, keyboards, engineer (2005–2009)

== Discography ==
=== Studio albums ===
- First Tape (1 September 1993)
- The Green Bicycle Case (July 1995)
- What Bird Is That? (September 1996)
- A Good Kind of Nervous (1997)
- Why That Doesn't Surprise Me (5 March 2001)
- Naturaliste (10 March 2003)
- Warmer Corners (4 April 2005)
- First Frost (2008)

=== Compilations ===
- Happy Secret (1999)
- Where Were We? (2002)
- Spring a Leak (2007)
- Cartography for Beginners: A Best of the Lucksmiths (2013)

=== Extended plays ===
- Boondoggle (1 October 1994)
- Staring at the Sky (1999)
- A Little Distraction (1 September 2003)
- The Chapter in Your Life Entitled San Francisco (4 July 2005)
- A Hiccup in Your Happiness (February 2006)
