= The Green Bicycle Case =

Studio album by The Lucksmiths
- Released: July 1995
- Recorded: March & April 1995
- Genre: Indie pop
- Length: 32:05
- Label: Candle

The Lucksmiths chronology
Boondoggle (1994)	The Green Bicycle Case (1995)	What Bird Is That? (1996)

The Green Bicycle Case is the second album from Australian indie pop group, the Lucksmiths, which was released in July 1995 on Candle Records (catalogue number LUCKY3.)

== Reception ==
Professional ratings
Review scores
Source	Rating
AllMusic	4/5 stars

Ned Raggett of AllMusic rated The Green Bicycle Case as 4 out of 5 stars and explained how the group "approached their first real album, per se, with well-deserved confidence and came up trumps... [it] showcases the band's virtue for getting things done without wasting time – 12 songs in just over half an hour, nearly all of them winners."

== Track listing ==
1. "Jewel Thieves" – 2:13
2. "Motorscooter" – 2:59
3. "The Tichborne Claimant" – 2:05
4. "Spond" – 2:43
5. "Two Storeys" – 4:22
6. "Detective Agency" – 2:44
7. "Thomas and Martha" – 3:32
8. "Mezzanine" – 2:05
9. "William and Mary" – 1:16
10. "Only Angels Have Wings" – 3:02
11. "Aviatrix" – 2:02
12. "From Here to Maternity" – 3:02
