= The Dearhunters =

Australian band

- Origin: Sydney, New South Wales, Australia
- Genres: Indie rock, alternative country, pop, rock
- Years active: 1998–2000
- Label: Candle Records
- Past members: Dave Ashton; Greg Hitchcock; Tim Oxley; Jodi Phillis; Raphael Whittingham

The Dearhunters were an Australian indie and alternative country band from Sydney.

== History ==
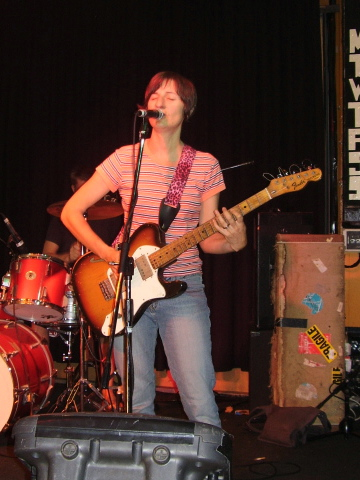
Phillis performing in 2006

In 1998, Greg Hitchcock, Tim Oxley, Jodi Phillis and Raphael Whittingham, who were successful artists solo or in various other acts, formed The Dearhunters in a pub in Sydney. They first performed several times under the name "Lunar Tunes" in April 1998. The group released a single album, "Red Wine and Blue" which was recorded in roughly three weeks, and released under Candle Records in 1999; it was launched at the Hopetoun Hotel in Surry Hills. On working on the album, Phillis said in an interview that "in this group I feel free to explore any territory and I’m not afraid to get too introspective or sentimental". She went on further to say that The Dearhunters was a side project for her.

They also appeared on a compilation featuring artists or groups under Candle Records, as well as releasing a split EP shared with Hired Guns, which was released on vinyl. "Red wine and blue" features dual vocals between Oxley and Phillis, and as a group, they have produced favorable reviews. Following the release of their split EP in 1999 and full-length album in the same year, Whittingham left the group and was replaced by Ashton. Then, after a small subsequent tour following their album release, the group disbanded and returned to prior musical projects or engaged in new ones.

== Discography ==
- Split 7" (1999)
- Red Wine and Blue (1999)

=== Compilations ===
- 'Banter' Candle Compilation (2000)

== Members ==
- Dave Ashton - drums (1999–2000)
- Greg Hitchcock - guitars (1998–2000)
- Tim Oxley - vocals, bass (1998–2000)
- Jodi Phillis - vocals, guitar (1998–2000)
- Raphael Whittingham - drums (1998–1999)

Information on band members.
