= Richard in Your Mind =

Australian psychedelic pop band

- Origin: Sydney, New South Wales, Australia
- Genres: Psychedelic pop, sampledelica
- Years active: 2006–present
- Labels: Broken Stone, Rice Is Nice
- Members: Richard Cartwright; Conrad Richters; Pat Torres; Richard Cuthbert; Josef Muller
- Past members: Jordy Lane; Brent Griffin; Alyx Dennison; Joel Werner; Nicholas Long; Andrew Elston

Richard in Your Mind are an Australian psychedelic pop band from Sydney. They were formed in 2006 by then house-mates Richard Cartwright and Conrad Richters and expanded in 2008 with Pat Torres and Jordy Lane and later adding Brent Griffin (aka SPOD) and Alyx Dennison (from Sydney duo kyü). They released their debut album, The Future Prehistoric, in December 2007 and two years later followed it up with their online only Summertime EP. Their second album, My Volcano, was released in 2010 and soon followed by third album SUN in 2011. Their fourth album Ponderosa was released on 29 August 2014. Their latest album Super Love Brain was released on 21 September 2018.

== Musical style ==
Richard in Your Mind have been described as borrowing their sound and style from 60s psychedelic pop, Strawberry Fields era Beatles, and distinctly modern hip hop and electronic influences and recording styles. This combination is described as 'sampledelica'. These broad musical influences are reflected in the band's choice of instrumentation outside the generic guitar/bass/drums, the artists choosing to use eastern strings and percussion, as well as spoken word samples and breakbeats. Their stage presence, use of props and elaborate decoration in their live performance has been well received by the Australian music media and are an homage to the elaborate shows of other neo-psychedelia bands such as The Flaming Lips.

== Discography ==
=== Albums ===
| Title | Details |
|---|---|
| The Future Prehistoric | Released: 2007; Label: Broken Stone Records – BSR003; Format: CD, digital download |
| My Volcano | Released: 2010; Label: Rice Is Nice Records – RIN009; Format: CD, digital download |
| Sun | Released: 2011; Label: Rice Is Nice Records – RIN013; Format: CD, digital download, vinyl |
| Ponderosa | Released: 2014; Label: Rice Is Nice Records – RIN024; Format: CD, digital download, vinyl |
| Super Love Brain | Released: 2018; Label: Rice Is Nice Records – RIN051; Format: CD, digital download |

=== Extended plays ===
| Title | Details |
|---|---|
| Summertime | Released: 2009; Label: Rice is Nice; Format: CD, digital download |
| Mozzarella | Released: 2012; Label: Rice Is Nice; Format: CD, digital download |

== Awards ==
=== AIR Awards ===
The Australian Independent Record Awards (commonly known informally as AIR Awards) is an annual awards night to recognise, promote and celebrate the success of Australia's Independent Music sector.

| Year | Nominee / work | Award | Result |
|---|---|---|---|
| 2010 | themselves | Breakthrough Independent Artist | Nominated |

=== Australian Music Prize ===
The Australian Music Prize (the AMP) is an annual award of $30,000 given to an Australian band or solo artist in recognition of the merit of an album released during the year of award. The commenced in 2005.

| Year | Nominee / work | Award | Result |
|---|---|---|---|
| 2010 | My Volcano | Australian Music Prize | Nominated |

=== J Award ===
The J Awards are an annual series of Australian music awards that were established by the Australian Broadcasting Corporation's youth-focused radio station Triple J. They commenced in 2005.

| Year | Nominee / work | Award | Result |
|---|---|---|---|
| 2010 | "Candelabra" (Director: SPOD) | Australian Video of the Year | Nominated |
