= Lowtide (album) =

Studio album by Lowtide
- Released: 17 July 2014
- Recorded: 2012 – 2014
- Studio: Soundpark Studios
- Genres: Dream pop; shoegaze; post-rock; ambient
- Length: 39:34
- Labels: Lost and Lonesome; Opposite Number
- Producer: Gareth Parton

Lowtide chronology
You Are My Good Light (2010)	Lowtide (2014)	Southern Mind (2018)

Singles from Lowtide
- 1. "Blue Movie" Released: 1 May 2014; 2. "Held" Released: 12 June 2014; 3. "Wedding Ring" Released: 7 October 2014

Lowtide is the debut album by Australian indie rock band Lowtide, released on 17 July 2014 by Lost and Lonesome Recording Co. and Opposite Number. It is their first full-fledged album release, after their debut EP, You Are My Good Light, in 2010 and their debut single, "Underneath Tonight/Memory No. 7" in 2011.

The album was promoted with three singles: "Blue Movie", "Held" and "Wedding Ring". The band also embarked on the "Album Launch Tour" to also promote the album, running from 25 July to 7 September 2014. Upon release, Lowtide received positive reviews from critics.

== Background ==
After releasing their debut EP, You Are My Good Light, in July 2010 as well as their debut standalone single "Underneath Tonight/Memory No. 7" in April 2011 through Bandcamp exclusively, the band published a cryptic Facebook post stating "18. 07. 14." as well as an album cover, announcing the album and its release date. According to an interview by Sounds Better With Reverb, bassist and lead vocalist Giles Simon said:

We recorded the album over two years or more. We had demos and ideas for some of the songs that probably date from around the time of the first EP.

In May, the band completed a test pressing of the album. In May 2016, the band announced that English independent record label Opposite Number would be releasing Lowtide internationally on 5 August for the United States, United Kingdom, Europe and Asia.

== Promotion ==
=== Singles and music videos ===
In May 2014, "Blue Movie" was released as the lead single for the album, with its music video released the same month. In June 2014, "Held" was released as the second single from the album, with the music video also premiering the same month. In October 2014, "Wedding Ring" was released as the third single to the album, with the music video for it released in June 2016.

=== Tour ===
A tour called the "Lowtide Album Launch Tour" was planned for the album's release and promotion, running from 25 July to 7 September 2014.

== Artwork ==
The album cover for the album depicts an explosion of a blue-blackish, rocky surface, with light pink dust and bits trailing off into the air. Some parts of the surface are visible on a sliver of the top half, with the word "Lowtide" in lowercase and bold red.

== Release ==
The album was originally released in Australia and New Zealand on 17 July 2014 by Lost and Lonesome Recording Co. with a limited production run on vinyl records. Opposite Number then released the album in the United States, United Kingdom, Europe and Asia on 5 August 2016, with CD and vinyl pre-orders in those countries handled by Rough Trade.

== Critical reception ==
Professional ratings
Review scores
Source	Rating
Rolling Stone	4/5 stars
Sounds Better With Reverb	3.9/5 stars

Lowtide received positive reviews from critics. Doug Wallen from Rolling Stone gave the album a 4-star rating, praising the songs "Wedding Ring" and "Held", concluding that "The album houses a perfect mix of the driving and drifting, with songs changing shape right before our ears." Sounds Better With Reverb gave the album a positive review, stating that "‘Lowtide’ is an ambitious album and it sounds flawless".

== Track listing ==
No.	Title	Length
1.	"Whale"	6:38
2.	"Held"	2:56
3.	"Autumn"	0:54
4.	"Blue Movie"	4:55
5.	"Wedding Ring"	4:27
6.	"Yesterday"	4:00
7.	"Missing History"	6:13
8.	"Maxillæ Leaving, Seaward"	4:33
9.	"Still Time"	4:55
Total length:		39:31

== Release history ==
Region	Date	Format	Label	Catalogue no.
Australia	17 July 2014	CD; Download; Vinyl	Lost & Lonesome Recording Co.	L&L86
New Zealand	17 July 2014	CD; Download; Vinyl	Lost & Lonesome Recording Co.	L&L86
United States	5 August 2016	CD; Download; Vinyl	Opposite Number	oppono1
United Kingdom	5 August 2016	CD; Download; Vinyl	Opposite Number	oppono1
Europe	5 August 2016	CD; Download; Vinyl	Opposite Number	oppono1
Asia	5 August 2016	CD; Download; Vinyl	Opposite Number	oppono1
