= The Laurels (band) =

Australian band

- Origin: Sydney, New South Wales, Australia
- Genres: Neo-psychedelia, shoegazing
- Years active: 2004–present
- Labels: Magnetic Recording Council, Other Tongues, Rice Is Nice
- Members: Piers Cornelius; Luke O'Farrell; Kat Harley; Ben James
- Past members: Kate Wilson; Aimee-Lee Curran; Conor Hannan; Jasper Fenton
- Website: thelaurels.bandcamp.com

The Laurels are an Australian neo-psychedelic four-piece based in Sydney's Inner West. They formed in 2006 after the members met through mutual friends at a silly hat party, each of them originally living in disparate parts of the East Coast of Australia. The band garnered critical acclaim in the Sydney live music scene after playing extensively throughout the latter 2000s in both headline and international support slots before releasing their debut single "Art School Girl"/"Wandering Star'" in 2009 and their full length Plains album in 2012.

The band's second album, Sonicology, was released in October 2016 and their third Homecoming in March 2022.

== Musical style ==
The Laurels developed a live sound that differs notably to the sound that appears on their recordings. The band uses shoegazing guitar techniques and understated vocals to emulate the loud and heavily distorted sound of 90's artists such as Ride and My Bloody Valentine when playing live. The band says that their live wall of sound style arose from their reliance on layered guitar recordings for their recorded works, and that the best way to emulate this live with only two guitars was to play at a greatly increased volume.

Shoegaze influences also feature strongly on the group's recordings, with many of their songs using multiple guitar layers and reverberation to achieve complex musical textures. However, while many shoegaze groups intentionally use lower recording quality to add texture to their recordings, the Laurels' works are notably cleaner and of higher fidelity than the bands from which they take influence.

== Reception and critical success ==
The Laurels' extensive live headline shows and support slots for international artists throughout the late 2000s and early 2010s in Sydney and Melbourne were well received by the Australian music media. They have won and gained nominations for several awards for their live shows. In 2011 they were nominated Best Live Music Act in FBi Radio's Sydney Music, Arts & Culture Awards.

== Discography ==
=== Studio albums ===
Title	Details
Plains	Released: 6 July 2012; Label: Rice Is Nice (RIN016); Format: CD, LP, digital
Sonicology	Released: 14 October 2016; Label: Rice Is Nice ( RIN045); Format: CD, LP, digital
Homecoming	Released: 25 March 2022; Label: Third Eye Stimuli Records; Format: CD, LP, digital

=== Extended Plays ===
Title	Details
Mesozoic	Released: 2011; Label: Other Tongues (OTH94028); Format: CD, digital
