= Lowtide =

- Origin: Melbourne, Australia
- Genres: Indie rock
- Years active: 2010–present
- Labels: Lost and Lonesome; Opposite Number; Polyester; Rice Is Nice
- Members: Lucy Buckeridge; Gabriel Lewis; Anton Jakovljevic
- Past members: Giles Simon

Lowtide is an Australian indie rock band formed in 2008 in Melbourne. It currently consists of Lucy Buckeridge (bass, vocals), Gabriel Lewis (guitars) and Anton Jakovljevic (drums). They are known for their expansive, reverb-heavy sound and aesthetic and are currently signed to Rice Is Nice and Opposite Number.

The group was originally formed in 2008 as Three Month Sunset but renamed to Lowtide in 2010, where they emerged with their debut EP, You Are My Good Light in July. They then released the single, "Underneath Tonight/Memory No. 7" in April 2011. After this, they then released their eponymous debut album in 2014 to positive reviews from critics. The band then followed up with the single "Julia/Spring" in 2015. Their sophomore album, Southern Mind, was released on 16 February 2018.

== History ==
=== Formation, You Are My Good Light and single (2008-2014) ===
According to the band's artist page on Lost & Lonesome Recording Co., the band formed in 2008 as Three Month Sunset when the members became inspired centrally by the solo works of guitarist Gabriel Lewis. However, in 2010, the group renamed themselves to Lowtide and became largely active as a band after this. In July, the band released their debut EP You Are My Good Light on July by its record label and on their Bandcamp account. In April 2011, the band released the single "Underneath Tonight/Memory No. 7" through Bandcamp.

In April 2014, the band published a Facebook post stating "18. 07. 14." as well as album artwork, officially announcing their debut album of the same name and release date. On May, in anticipation for their debut album, the band released the song "Blue Movie" as the lead single and completed a test pressing within the same month. In June, "Held" was released as the second single, with the band releasing the single on SoundCloud.

The album was released on 17 July and a tour for the album ran from 25 July to 7 September. James Feeney of Belwood Music felt the album displayed "hazy shared vocals, the vast labyrinthine soundscape of keyboards and guitars and in particular the slow and deliberate bass lines create something very heartfelt and evocative." He cautioned that "At first it feels like torpid traipse through the doldrums, then all the dense fog suddenly fades and you find yourself in the centre of a vibrant coral reef, bursting with life and colour." Rolling Stone Australia's Doug Wallen found that the "Key to the Melbourne quartet’s slippery uniqueness are the conversational exchanges between Lucy Buckeridge and Giles Simon, entwining their dual bass lines and vocals alike. Instead of banking purely on swirling guitar effects, Lowtide exploit rhythm and space." Sounds Better with Reverb's reviewer also praised Buckeridge and Simon, but also "Combine that with inventive compositions and the immersive work of guitarist Gabriel Lewis and you’ve got a recipe for a very good dream pop album! While the singles were strong, I really didn’t feel the full impact until I heard the album as whole. Then its claws stick in."

=== International releases, tours and Southern Mind (2014-present) ===
After the release of Lowtide, another Facebook post published in July 2015 confirmed an upcoming single, eventually revealed as "Julia/Spring", would be released on 28 August 2015; "Julia" is a cover of the original song released by Asylum Party in 1988. On August, a music video for the single directed by Jamieson Moore premiered that day.

In May 2016, Lowtide announced that English record label Opposite Number would release Lowtide internationally on 5 August and was available for pre-order online through Rough Trade.

Through Facebook, the band announced that recording work on their second studio album was completed and the departure of bassist and vocalist Giles Simon. They also announced the premiere of a new single, "Alibi", at the Northcote Social Club on 25 August, along with No Sister and Grand Outdoors, on 2 August. The single was released on 4 August. The band also are playing their first international tour, along with Rolling Blackouts Coastal Fever, dubbed the Lowtide UK/EU Tour, which debuted on 25 August.

On 7 November, the band announced their sophomore record, Southern Mind. It was released on 16 February 2018.

== Members ==
=== Current members ===
- Lucy Buckeridge – bass guitar, lead vocals (2008–present)
- Gabriel Lewis – guitars (2008–present)
- Anton Jakovljevic – drums (2008–present)

=== Former members ===
- Giles Simon – bass guitar, lead vocals (2008–2017)

== Discography ==
- Lowtide (2014)
- Southern Mind (2018)

== Tours ==
- Lowtide UK/EU Tour (2017)
