= Lost & Lonesome Recording Co. =

Lost and Lonesome Recording Co.
- Founded: 1997
- Genre: Indie pop
- Country of origin: Australia
- Location: Fitzroy, Victoria
- Official website: www.lostandlonesome.com.au

Lost and Lonesome Recording Co. (often simply Lost and Lonesome) is an Australian independent record label founded by Mark Monnone of The Lucksmiths and Jane McCracken of The Foots in 1997, based in Melbourne, Australia. The label specialises in indie pop, and has released both recordings by local artists and local releases by international indie bands.

== Roster ==
Artists who have released recordings on Lost & Lonesome include:

- The Aislers Set
- Alluvial Nuggetts
- The Bank Holidays
- Cryptacize
- The Curtains
- The Foots
- Hellogoodbye
- Je Suis Animal
- Lacto-Ovo
- The Ladybug Transistor
- Last Leaves
- Lowtide
- The Lucksmiths
- Mid-State Orange
- The Mosquitoes
- The Pains of Being Pure at Heart
- The Salteens
- Sleepy Township
- The Smallgoods
- Kirsty Stegwazi
- Still Flyin'
- The Zebras

== See also ==
- List of record labels
