= Rice Is Nice =

- Founded: 2008
- Founder: Julia Wilson, Ben Shackleton
- Genre: Various
- Country of origin: Australia
- Location: Sydney & Melbourne
- Official website: www.riceisnice.net

Rice Is Nice is an independent record label based in Sydney and Melbourne, Australia that takes its name from Welsh post-hardcore band Mclusky's 2000 single "Rice Is Nice". The label aims to promote artists that are unique and whose music will have longevity, rather than being based on popularity. Rice Is Nice is run by Julia Wilson and Lulu Rae.

== History ==
Rice Is Nice was formed in 2008 by Julia Wilson and Ben Shackleton. Wilson worked as a photographer and publicist in the music industry for the Australian labels Mushroom Records and Popfrenzy and used her knowledge to release SPOD's "Aminals" 7" as the label's first release in mid-2008. Since then, Rice Is Nice has signed and released the works of a number of Australian artists, the musical genres of which vary greatly.

In 2018, Rice Is Nice celebrated its tenth birthday, with a showcase at Melbourne Music Week and performances from SPOD, Sarah Mary Chadwick, Summer Flake, Richard in Your Mind, Straight Arrows and Rebel Yell. Being interviewed by LNWY in the lead up to the anniversary, Wilson said of the Rice Is Nice catalogue, "Everyone on the label is different, and they’re all doing what they do really well. That’s what I want to encourage and continue to do – to find people who are doing something really, really well".

Julia Wilson has a long-standing friendship with Henry Rollins, who is a vocal supporter of Rice Is Nice. Rollins has featured Rice Is Nice's catalogue of artists on his radio show on KCRW, and in August 2015, invited Wilson to co-host and curate the program with him.

== Artists ==
- Angie
- Darts
- Den
- Donny Benét
- Frowning Clouds
- Good Heavens
- The Laurels
- Le Villejuif Underground
- Lia Mice
- Lowtide
- Richard in Your Mind
- Rebel Yell
- Sarah Mary Chadwick
- Seekae
- Seja
- Shady Lane
- SPOD
- Straight Arrows
- Summer Flake
- You Beauty
