= The Small Knives =

- Origin: Melbourne, Victoria, Australia
- Genres: Indie rock
- Years active: 1995–present
- Label: Candle Records
- Members: Leo Mullins; Phil Romeril
- Website: Official website

The Small Knives are an Australian acoustic duo from Melbourne.

== History ==
The Small Knives are an acoustic duo composed of Leo Mullins and Phil Romeril, both formerly of the group 2 Litre Dolby. After relocating from Sydney to Melbourne, 2 Litre Dolby gained a strong following through their three releases (including a UK release) and renowned live shows. After 2 Litre Dolby parted ways in mid 2000, Leo and Phil formed The Friendly Injun using a more minimal ethic towards song writing. They combined acoustic guitars, fan powered organ and strong harmonies. The Friendly Injun later changed their name to The Small Knives.

The band started recording their debut album in October 2002. In 2004 their debut album Rain on Tin was officially released on Candle Records.

In 2007 their second full-length album, Smoke and Ribbons, was released on Plastic Viking Helmet Records. “It's positively aglow with a measured restraint reminiscent of the Pernice Brothers, Will Oldham or Gillian Welch,” wrote Jo Roberts for The Age, “inviting you to kick back and drink in the luxurious steel guitar, warm harmonies and sweet melodies in your own time.”

The Small Knives have shared stages with Nick Cave, The Dirty Three, Iron and Wine, Bill Callahan (Smog), Evan Dando, Art of Fighting, Preston School of Industry, Mark Eitzel, Machine Translations, New Buffalo, Gersey and Architecture in Helsinki.

In 2002 they performed at the Harvest Festival and played on the Gene Clark tribute album You Can't Hide Your Love Forever.

In 2007 they performed at All Tomorrow's Parties (curated by Dirty Three) in Minehead UK.

In 2009 they played at All Tomorrow's Parties (curated by Nick Cave) at Mount Buller, Victoria, Australia.

== Discography ==
- Rain on Tin (2004)
- Smoke and Ribbons (2007)
