= Jodi Phillis =

Australian musician

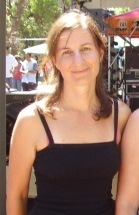
- Phillis in 2006

Background information
- Born: Jodi Christine Phillis; 11 April 1965 (age 61); Melbourne, Victoria, Australia
- Genres: Pop, indie rock, adult contemporary
- Occupation: Singer-songwriter
- Instruments: Vocals, guitar
- Years active: 1989–present
- Website: www.jodiphillis.com

Jodi Christine Phillis (born 11 April 1965) is an Australian singer-songwriter-guitarist and founding member of the band The Clouds. Phillis is best known for her vocal ability in many of her songs, such as "Hieronymus", "Souleater" and "Ghost of Love Returned".

== Early life ==
Born in Melbourne, Phillis spent her childhood in California, and moved back to Sydney, Australia to begin school. She quit school at 15, then spent eight years working as a graphic artist with surfwear company Mambo Graphics until she formed the band The Clouds, where she met fellow frontwoman and bassist Trish Young.

== Career ==
=== 1989–1997: The Clouds ===
The Clouds formed in December 1989 and released four studio albums between 1990 and 1996, all of which peaked within the ARIA top 50.

=== 1996–present: Solo ===
While still in The Clouds, Phillis explored a more mellow, acoustic direction with her debut solo album Lounge o' Sound, released in 1996.

In 2001, she released In Dreams I Live. The track "Waiting, Wanting, Holding" was featured in the ABC's series Love Is a Four-Letter Word. The album was nominated for two awards at the ARIA Music Awards of 2002. Her third solo album, For Lovers, Artists and Dreamers, was released in 2004.

In 2013, Phillis attended the Australian Film Television and Radio School (AFTRS), to study composition and graduated with a Certificate in Screen Music. Jodi's screen credits include the feature film Convict, and numerous TV commercials and television shows.

In 2017, Phillis spearheaded the composer's project, Seven Stories, in collaboration with Ensemble Offspring and six other prominent female composers, Amanda Brown, Caitlin Yeo, Sally Whitwell, Bree van Reyk, Kyls Burtland and Jane Sheldon with text by Hilary Bell. Seven Stories premiered during Sydney's Vivid Festival.

In 2018, Phillis released her Becoming album. Produced by Tim Oxley and penned by Jodi, it was an album that covered topics such as grief, loss, love and menopause. The album was rated at number 5 in Your Music Radar's "Top 20 Best Australian Albums of 2018", with Brian Parker opining, "An album that serves as a chronicle of one person's experience of change, yet ultimately becomes therapeutic for her listener – giving hope that life and love is worth it, and with change comes positivity. A beautiful album that marks Phillis as one of Australia’s vital singer-songwriters."

=== 2005–2007: The Girls from the Clouds ===
In 2005, Phillis reunite with former Clouds band-mate Trish Young, under the moniker The Girls from the Clouds. Their EP Lalalala was released in early 2006. After 18 months, however, Phillis and Young once again went their separate ways.

== Discography ==
=== Albums ===
List of albums, with selected details
| Title | Details |
|---|---|
| Lounge O Sound | Released: 1996; Label: Red Eye Records (RED CD 55); Format: CD |
| In Dreams I Live | Released: 2001; Label: Candle Records (CAN2514); Format: CD |
| For Lovers, Artists and Dreamers | Released: 2003; Label: Candle Records (CAN2531); Format: CD |
| Sonum Vitae | Released: 2013; Label: Jodi Phillis; Format: digital |
| Becoming | Released: 2018; Label: Jodi Phillis (Cat 0005); Format: CD, LP, digital |
| We Need to Be Free | Released: 2022; Label: Cheersquad Records & Tapes (CRT073); Format: CD, LP, digital |

== Awards and nominations ==
=== ARIA Music Awards ===
The ARIA Music Awards is an annual awards ceremony that recognises excellence, innovation, and achievement across all genres of Australian music. They commenced in 1987.

| Year | Nominee / work | Award | Result |
|---|---|---|---|
| 2001 | In Dreams I Live | Best Adult Contemporary Album | Nominated |
| 2001 | In Dreams I Live | Best Female Artist | Nominated |
