= Candle Records =

Record company in Australia

- Founded: 1994
- Founder: Chris Crouch
- Defunct: 2007
- Genre: Independent rock
- Country of origin: Australia
- Location: Melbourne; Sydney

Candle Records was an independent record label that operated from 1994 to 2007. Candle Records was originally based in Melbourne, Australia and founded in September 1994 by Chris Crouch.

The label concentrated only on local bands with an "emphasis on strong lyrics and a wistful, often humorous Australian feel" and was run more like a co-op than a corporation. Bands on the label would help each other, promoting the label and CD releases, as well as doing shows together. The first release by the label was The Simpletons's EP, Nod, in October 1994 with the catalogue number 'SIM 2481' - a reference to the postal code for town of Lismore, NSW, where the band formed. This was followed later that year by The Lucksmiths' Boondoggle and Cuddlefish's Grap's Fruity Elixir.

Candle went on to have over 100 releases. They took over independent record shop, PolyEster Records, on Melbourne's Brunswick Street and opened a Sydney office ran by Danielle Atkinson. Crouch decided to close the label down on 31 March 2007, citing "time for a change". The last release by the label was Darren Hanlon's single, "Elbows", in February 2007.

Just before closing down the record label, Candle put on a big farewell show that toured the east coast of Australia. Starting in Brisbane, and then moving to Sydney and finally Melbourne, the all-star show consisted of sets by regular Candle family members The Lucksmiths, Darren Hanlon, Anthony Atkinson and the Running Mates, The Girls From The Clouds, Mid-State Orange and The Small Knives. The Sydney gig, and the first of the two Melbourne shows, notably ended with an all-star cast performing an encore of Michael Jackson's "We Are The World".

== Artists ==
- The Guild League
- Darren Hanlon
- The Lucksmiths
- Jodi Phillis
- Ruck Rover
- Anthony Atkinson
- Rob Clarkson
- Cuddlefish
- The Dearhunters
- Richard Easton
- The Girls From The Clouds
- Golden Rough
- The Mabels
- Mid-State Orange
- Tim Oxley
- The Simpletons
- The Small Knives
- Stella One Eleven
- Weave

== Note ==
An unrelated record company with this name existed in Hobart in the 1970s and 1980s, with Nick Armstrong as the owner/manager. Ian Paulin was one of the artists to be associated.

== See also ==
- List of record labels
