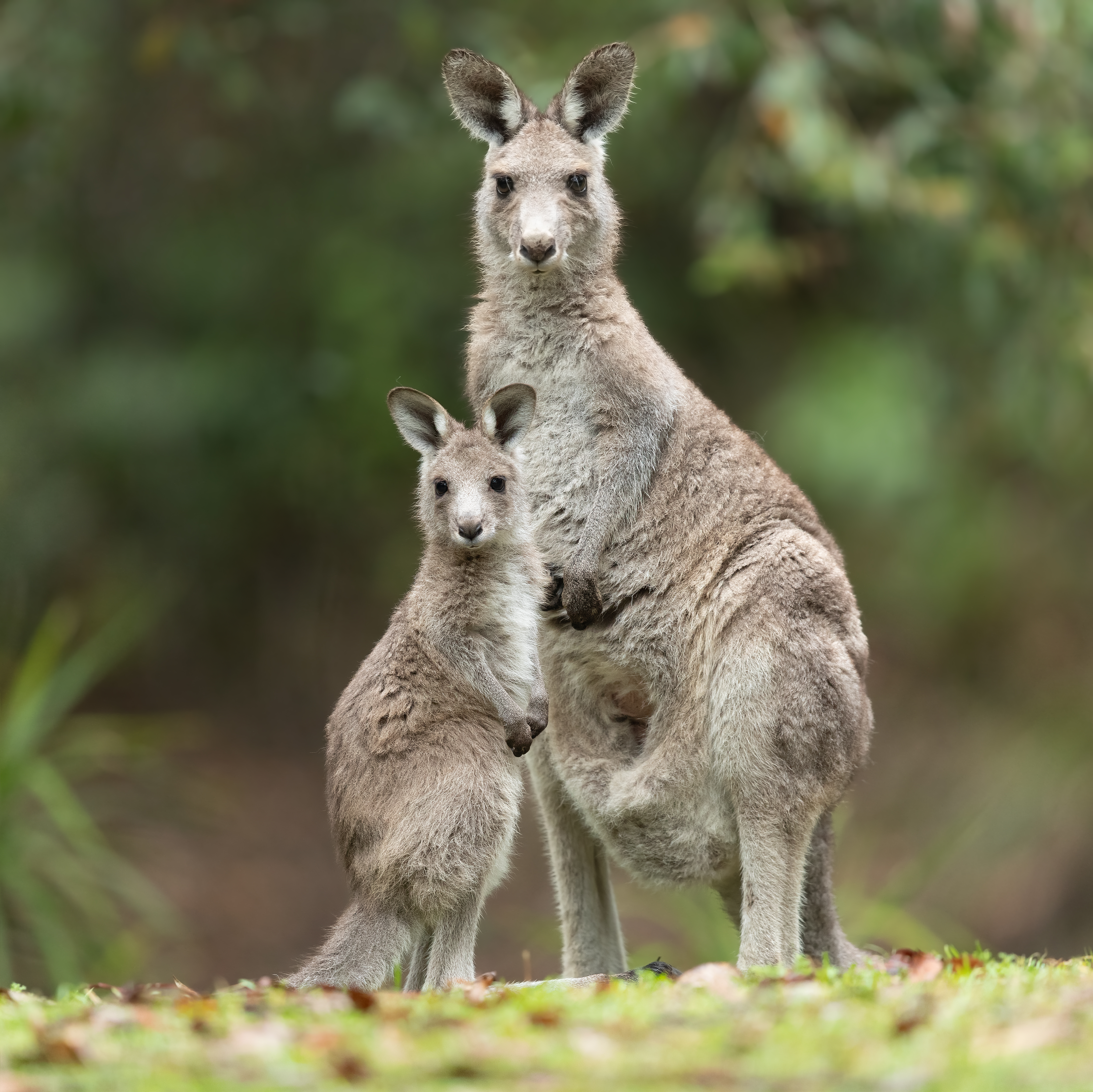
- A female and joey at the Brunkerville

Conservation status
- Least Concern (IUCN 3.1)

Scientific classification
- Kingdom: Animalia
- Phylum: Chordata
- Class: Mammalia
- Infraclass: Marsupialia
- Order: Diprotodontia
- Family: Macropodidae
- Genus: Macropus
- Species: M. giganteus

Binomial name
- Macropus giganteus Shaw, 1790
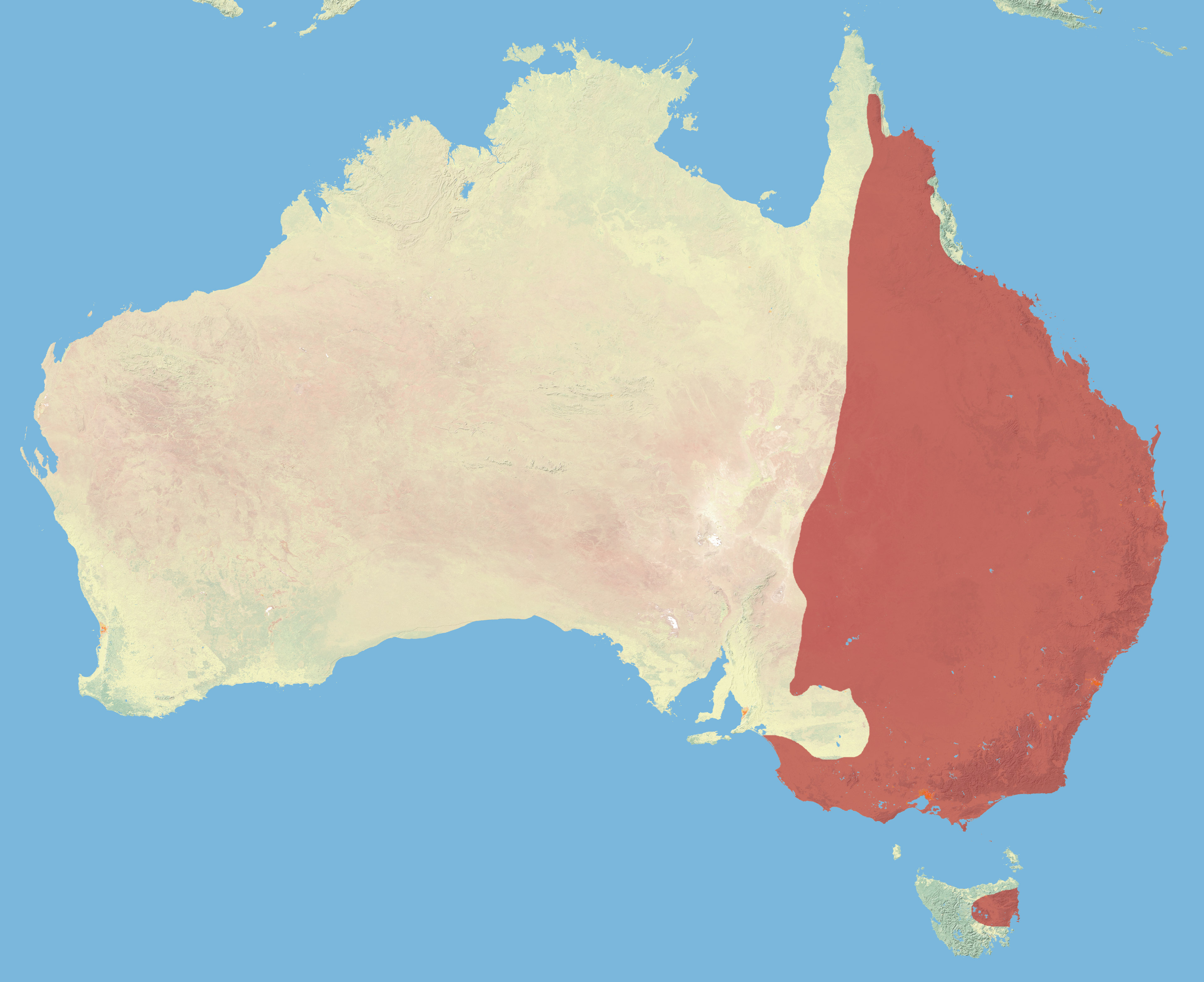
- Eastern grey kangaroo range

= Eastern grey kangaroo =

Eastern grey kangaroo Temporal range: 5–0 Ma Early Pliocene – Recent

Species of kangaroo

The eastern grey kangaroo (Macropus giganteus: gigantic large-foot; also great grey kangaroo or forester kangaroo) is a marsupial found in the eastern third of Australia, with a population of several million. A large M. giganteus kangaroo male can typically weigh up to 69 kg (152 lb) and have a length of well over 2 m (6 ft 7 in).

== Taxonomy ==
The eastern grey kangaroo was described by George Shaw in 1790 as Macropus giganteus.

=== Subspecies ===
While two subspecies were recognised by Mammal Species of the World (MSW), there is some dispute as to the validity of this division, and the subspecies are not recognised by the Australian Mammal Society, the IUCN, or the American Society of Mammalogists, which produces the successor of the MSW. Albert Sherbourne Le Souef created the Tasmanian subspecies in 1923, based on coat colour. In 1972 Kirsch and Poole published a paper supporting the concept of separate species for the eastern and western greys, but casting doubt on the subspecies M. g. tasmaniensis, as

...these subspecies, or species as Le Souef (1923) would have it in the case of the Tasmanian forester, are based on so little study of so little material that we do not believe that they should be recognized as such at this time.

A later study published in 2003 was also critical of the division, stating that

Phylogenetic comparisons between M. g. giganteus and M. g. tasmaniensis indicated that the current taxonomic status of these subspecies should be revised as there was a lack of genetic differentiation between the populations sampled."

The subspecies recognised by Mammal Species of the World were:

- Macropus giganteus giganteus – found in eastern and central Queensland, Victoria, New South Wales and southeastern South Australia
- Macropus giganteus tasmaniensis – (commonly known as the forester kangaroo) endemic to Tasmania

== Description ==
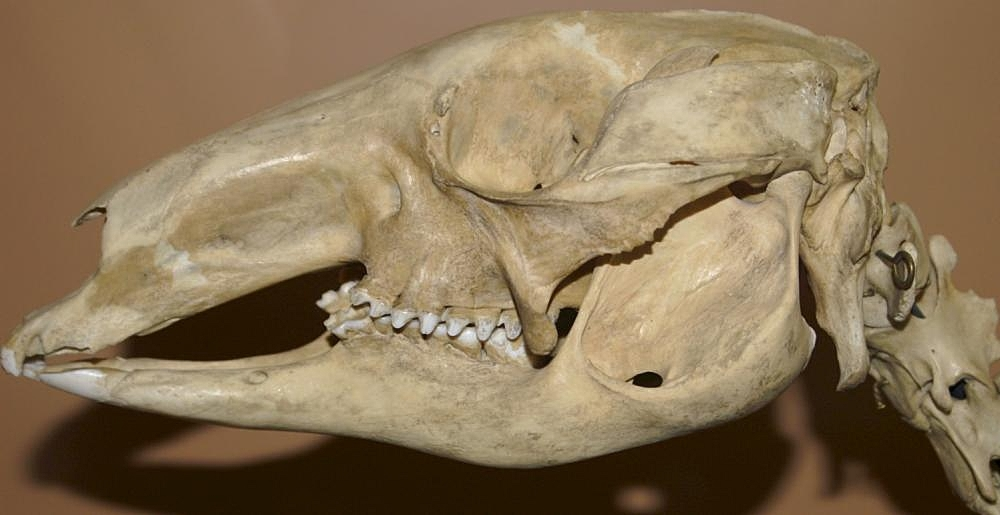
Skull

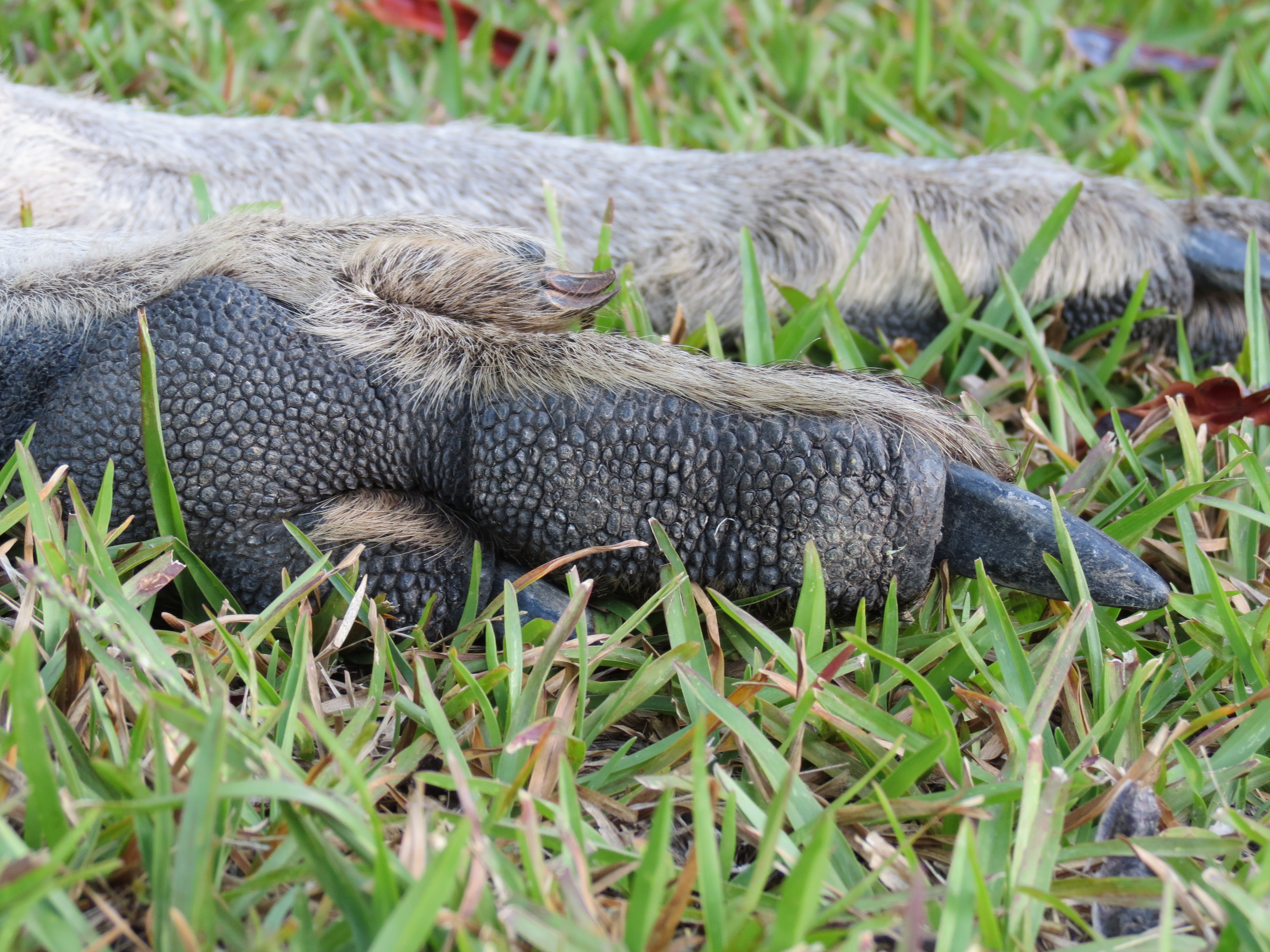
Underside of the hind foot with a sharp claw

3D scan of the skeleton of Macropus giganteus

The eastern grey kangaroo is the second largest and heaviest living marsupial and native land mammal in Australia. An adult male will commonly weigh around 50 to 66 kg (110 to 146 lb) whereas females commonly weigh around 17 to 40 kg (37 to 88 lb). They have a powerful tail that is over 1 m (3 ft 3 in) long in adult males. One of these, shot in eastern Tasmania weighed 82 kg (181 lb), with a 2.64 m (8 ft 8 in) total length from nose to tail (possibly along the curves). The largest known specimen, examined by Lydekker, had a weight of 91 kg (201 lb) and measured 2.92 m (9 ft 7 in) along the curves. When the skin of this specimen was measured it had a "flat" length of 2.49 m (8 ft 2 in).

The eastern grey is easy to recognise: its soft grey coat is distinctive, and it is usually found in moister, more fertile areas than the red. Red kangaroos, though sometimes grey-blue in colour, have a totally different face than eastern grey kangaroos. Red kangaroos have distinctive markings in black and white beside their muzzles and along the sides of their face. Eastern grey kangaroos do not have these markings, and their eyes seem large and wide open.

Where their ranges overlap, it is much more difficult to distinguish between eastern grey and western grey kangaroos, which are closely related. They have a very similar body and facial structure, and their muzzles are fully covered with fine hair (though that is not obvious at a distance, their noses do look noticeably different from the noses of reds and wallaroos). The eastern grey's colouration is a light-coloured grey or brownish-grey, with a lighter silver or cream, sometimes nearly white, belly. The western grey is a dark dusty brown colour, with more contrast especially around the head. Australian Aboriginal names include iyirrbir (Kunjen) and kucha (Pakanha). The highest ever recorded speed of any kangaroo was 64 km/h (40 mph) set by a large female eastern grey kangaroo.

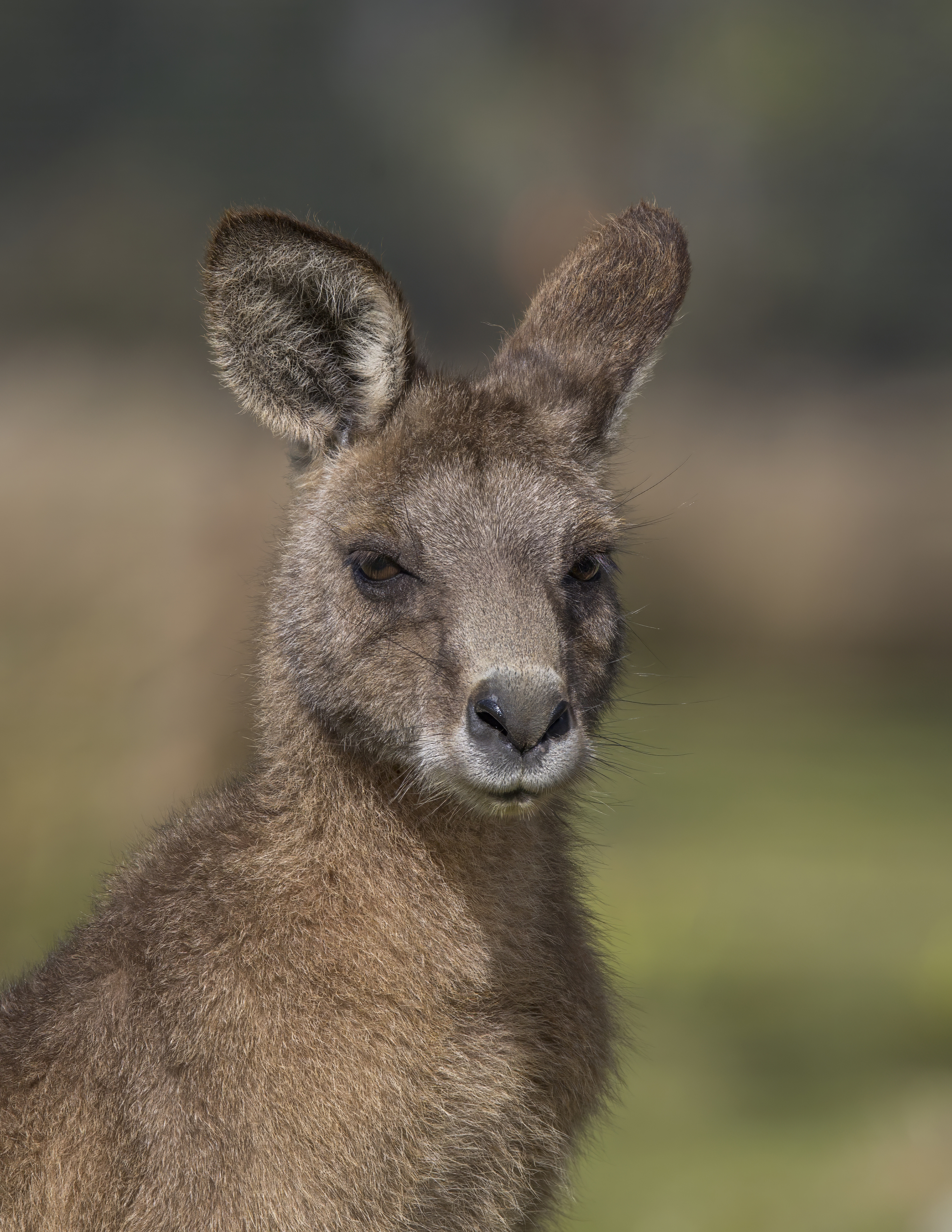
adult M. g. tasmaniensis

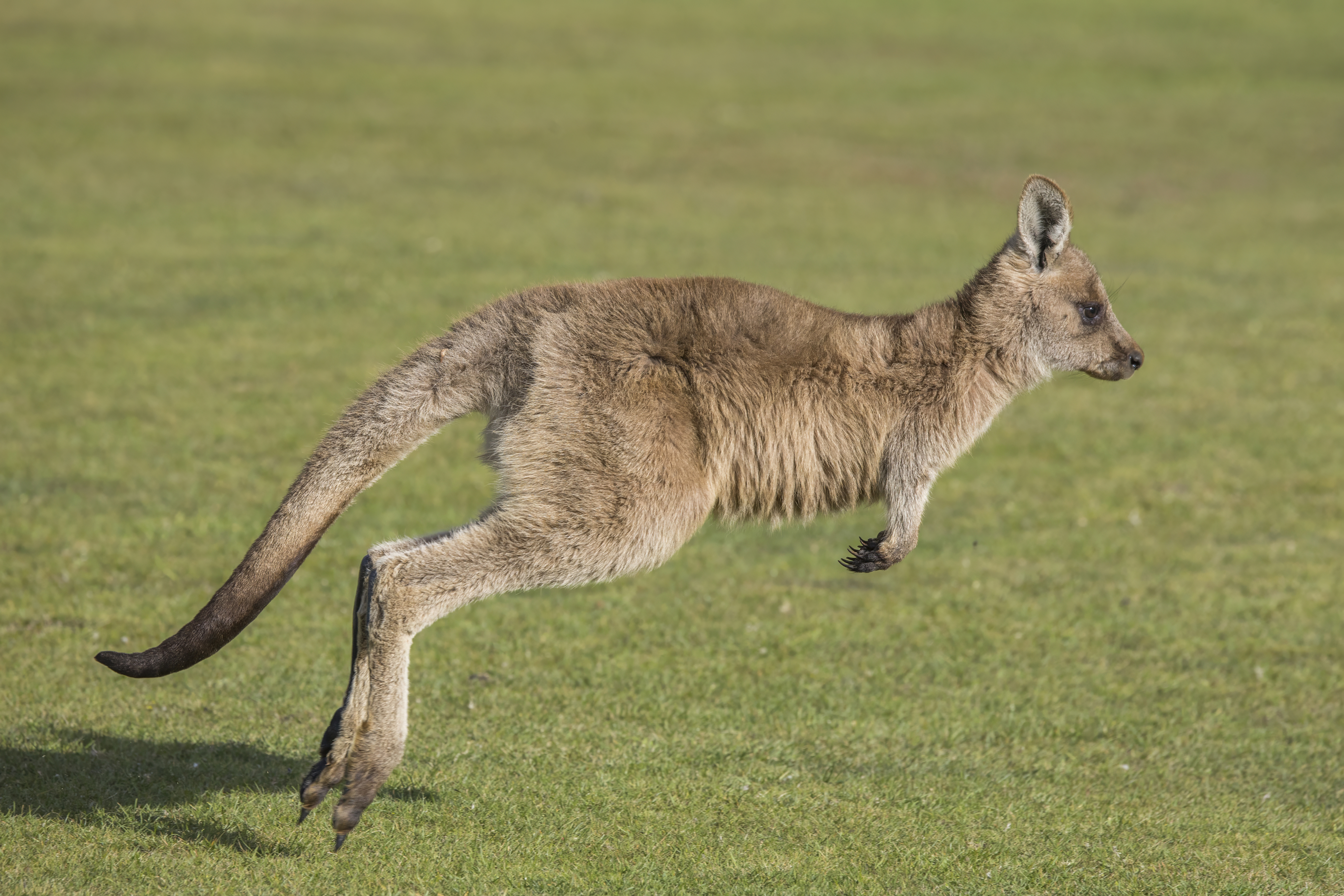
juvenile M. g. tasmaniensis

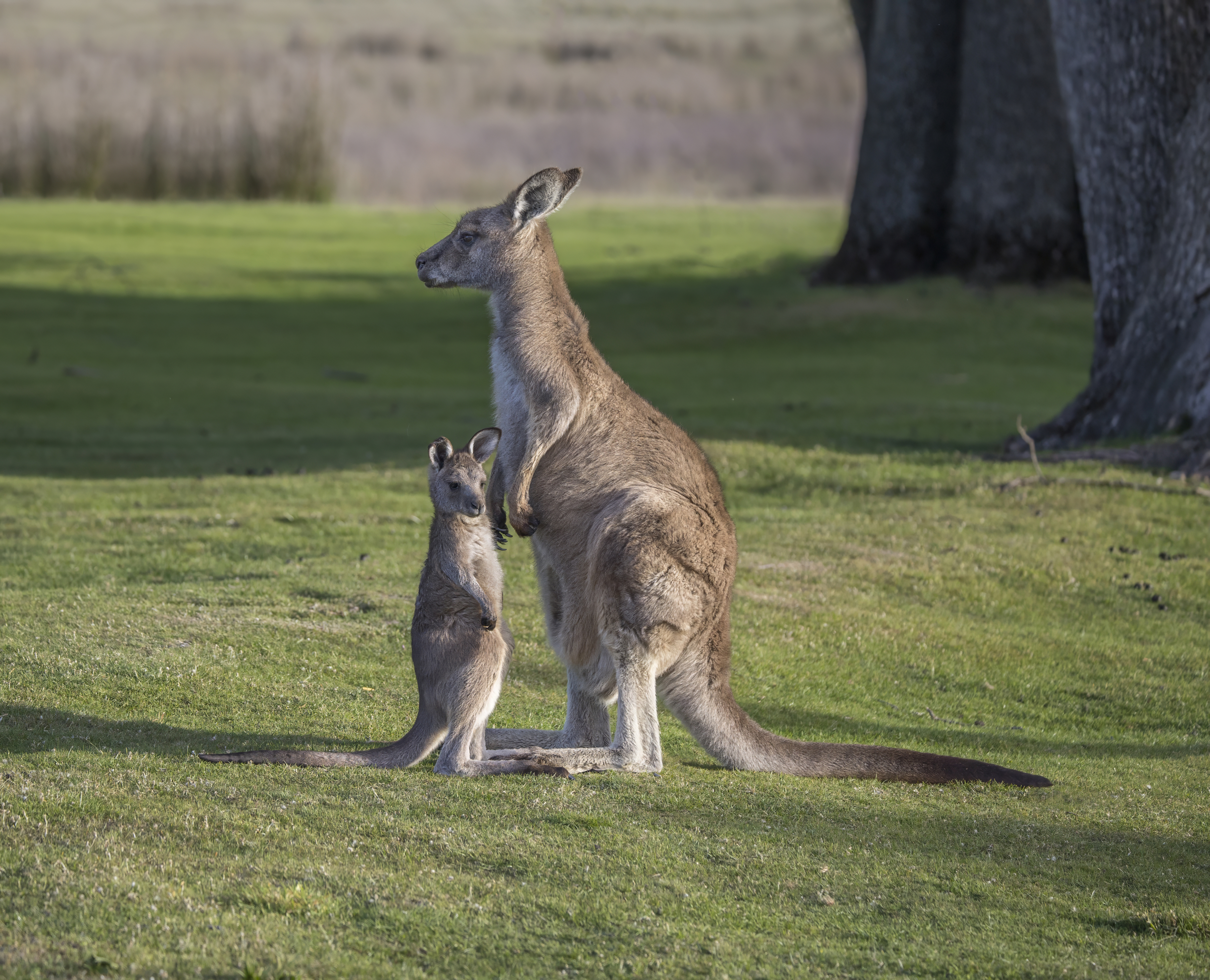
female with joey M. g. tasmaniensis

== Distribution and habitat ==
Although the red is better known, the eastern grey is the kangaroo most often encountered in Australia, due to its adaptability. Few Australians visit the arid interior of the continent, while many live in and around the major cities of the southern and eastern coast, from where it is usually only a short drive to the remaining pockets of near-city bushland where kangaroos can be found without much difficulty. The eastern grey prefers open grassland with areas of bush for daytime shelter and mainly inhabits the wetter parts of Australia. It also inhabits coastal areas, woodlands, sub-tropical forests, mountain forests, and inland scrubs.

== Behaviour ==
Like all kangaroos, it is mainly nocturnal and crepuscular, and is mostly seen early in the morning, or as the light starts to fade in the evening. In the middle of the day, kangaroos rest in the cover of the woodlands and eat there but then come out in the open to feed on the grasslands in large numbers. The eastern grey kangaroo mainly graze a wide variety of grasses and forbs compared to other species (e.g. the red kangaroo) that also include significant amounts of shrubs in their diet.

Eastern grey kangaroos are gregarious and form open-membership groups. The groups contain an average of three individuals. Smaller groups join to graze in preferred foraging areas, and to rest in large groups around the middle of the day. They exist in a dominance hierarchy and the dominant individuals gain access to better sources of food and areas of shade. However, kangaroos are not territorial. Eastern grey kangaroos adjust their behaviour in relation to the risk of predation with reproductive females, individuals on the periphery of the group and individuals in groups far from cover being the most vigilant. Vigilance in individual kangaroos does not seem to significantly decrease when the size of the group increases. However, there is a tendency for the proportion of individuals on the periphery of the group to decline as group size increases. The open membership of the group allows more kangaroos to join and thus provide more buffers against predators.

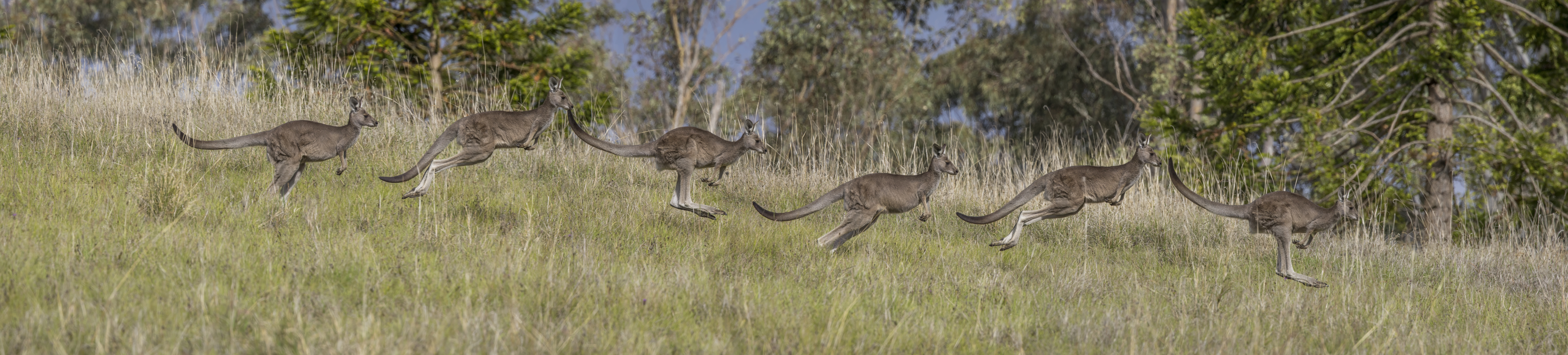
Composite image of M. g. giganteus from Mount Annan, New South Wales

=== Reproduction ===
Eastern grey kangaroos are polygynous which means that one male mates with multiple females. Males do a lot of intraspecific competition for mates which includes male-male fights to determine dominance between the two males. When a dominant male finds a female in estrus, he will court the female and eventually they copulate. After copulation, the male will guard the female from other males. This whole process from courting to when the male is done guarding the singular females is roughly an hour.

Females may form strong kinship bonds with their relatives. Females with living female relatives have a greater chance of reproducing. Most kangaroo births occur during the summer. Eastern grey kangaroos are obligate breeders in that they can reproduce in only one kind of habitat.

The female eastern grey kangaroo is usually permanently pregnant except on the day she gives birth; however, she has the ability to freeze the development of an embryo until the previous joey is able to leave the pouch. This is known as embryonic diapause, and will occur in times of drought and in areas with poor food sources. The composition of the milk produced by the mother varies according to the needs of the joey. Since lactation is very energy expensive, females that are lactating typically change some of their foraging habits. Some females will forage faster so they can tend to their joeys more, while others forage more aggressively so they can eat as much as possible. In addition, the mother is able to produce two different kinds of milk simultaneously for the newborn and the older joey still in the pouch. Unusually, during a dry period, males will not produce sperm, and females will conceive only if there has been enough rain to produce a large quantity of green vegetation. Females take care of the young without any assistance from the males. Female kangaroos with a joey often feed solitary in order to help separate themselves from the rest of the kangaroos in order to reduce predation. The joeys are heavily reliant on their mothers for about 550 days, which is when they are weaned. Females sexually mature between 17 and 28 months, while males mature at around 25 months.

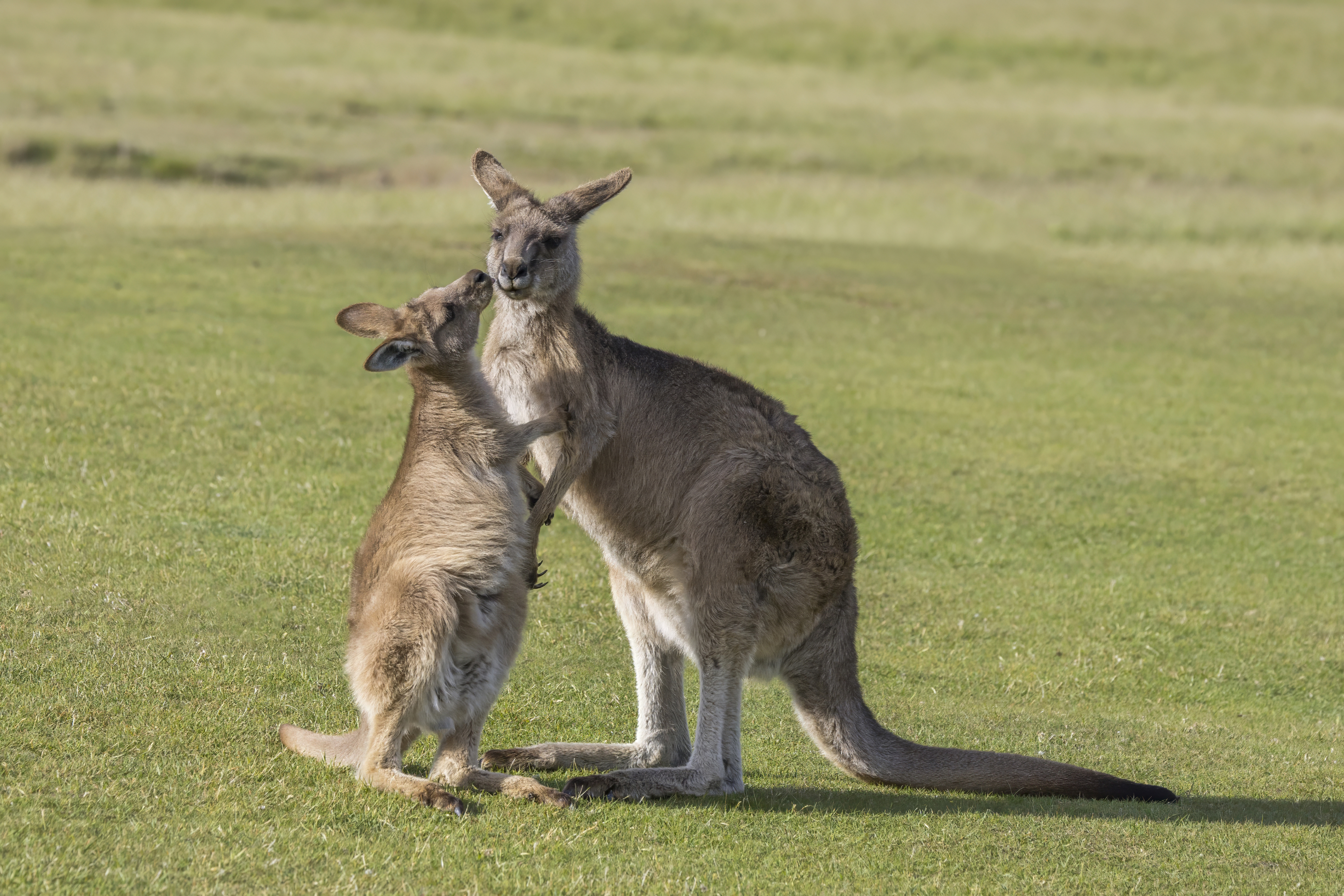
M. g. tasmaniensis

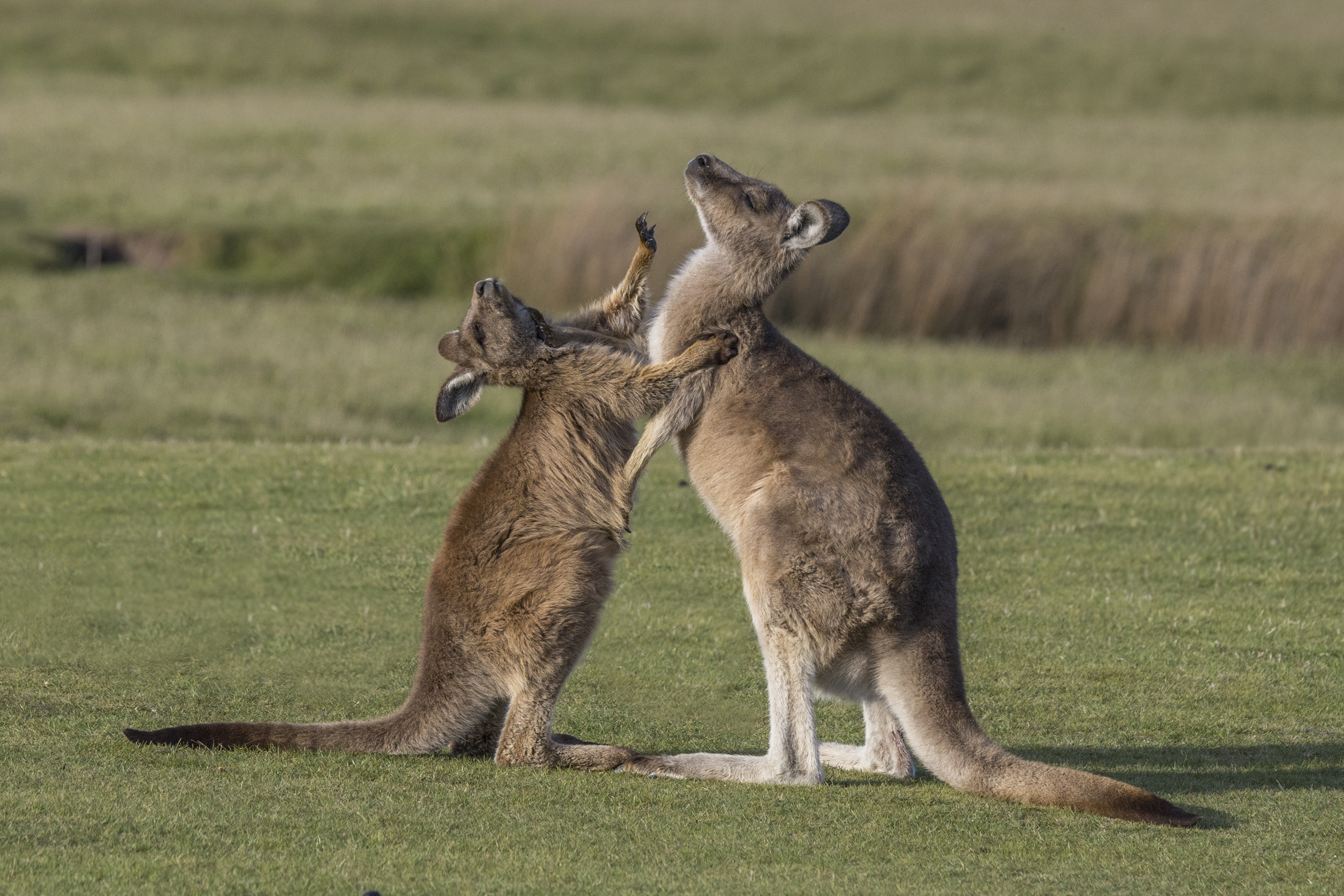
female and joey interacting

== Status ==
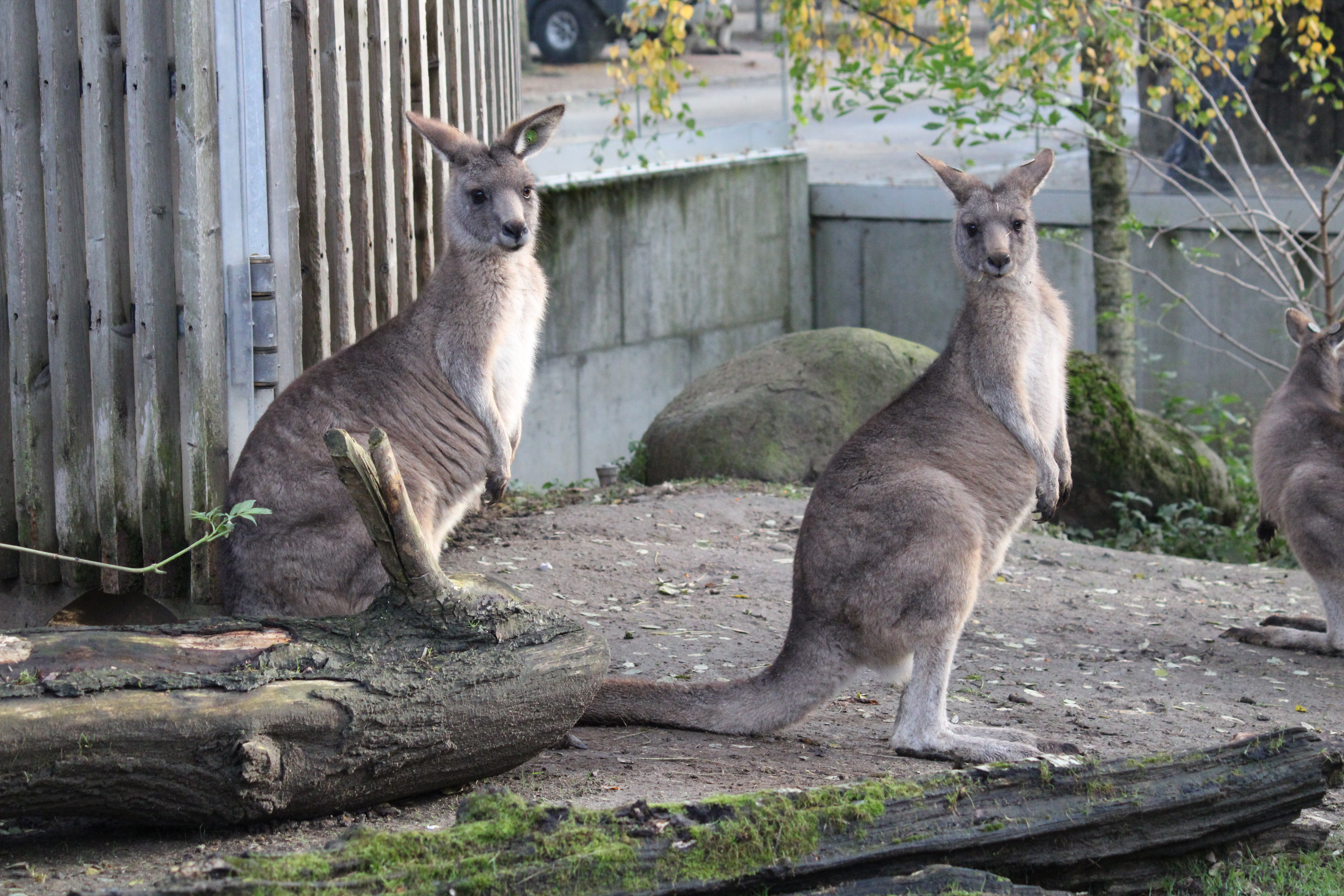
At Copenhagen Zoo

It is popularly thought, but not confirmed by evidence, that kangaroo populations have increased significantly since the European colonisation of Australia because of the increased areas of grassland (as distinct from forest), the reduction in dingo numbers, and the availability of artificial watering holes. The estimated population of the species Australia-wide in 2010 was 11.4 million. In some places the eastern grey is so numerous it causes overgrazing and some individual populations have been culled in some parts of Australia (see, for example, the Eden Park Kangaroo Cull). Despite the commercial harvest and some culls, the eastern grey remains common and widespread. Eastern greys are common in suburban and rural areas where they have been observed to form larger groups than in natural areas. It still covers the entire range it occupied when Europeans arrived in Australia in 1788 and it often comes into conflict with agriculture as it uses the more fertile districts that now carry crops or exotic pasture grasses, which kangaroos readily eat. Kangaroo meat has also been considered to replace beef in recent years, as their soft feet are preferable to hooves in erosion prone areas.
