= Hugh Wirth =

Australian veterinarian and animal welfare advocate

Hugh Wirth AM
- Born: 9 September 1939; Melbourne, Victoria, Australia
- Died: 5 February 2018 (aged 78)
- Education: Xavier College
- Alma mater: University of Queensland
- Occupation: Veterinarian
- Employers: RSPCA Victoria; ABC Radio
- Known for: Animal welfare advocate; Resident veterinarian for 30 years on 774 ABC Melbourne radio
- Awards: George T Angell Humanitarian Award from the Massachusetts Society for the Prevention of Cruelty to Animals (1988)

Hugh John Wirth AM (9 September 1939 – 5 February 2018) was an Australian veterinarian and animal welfare advocate in Victoria, Australia. In March 2011 he celebrated 30 years as the resident vet on 774 ABC Melbourne.

== Education and employment ==
Wirth attended Xavier College in Melbourne from 1949 to 1957. He graduated from the University of Queensland with a degree in veterinary science.

Wirth commenced work as an associate veterinary practitioner at Drouin veterinary surgery, from 1964 to 1965. After this he was employed as associate veterinary practitioner, Balwyn Veterinary Surgery, from 1965 to 1966. Wirth took over the Balwyn practice in January 1967 after the veterinarian went into hospital for an eye operation and never returned to the practice to work. He was the principal in the practice from January 1967 to his retirement in August 2006.

== Animal welfare advocacy ==
Wirth joined the RSPCA as a junior member in 1948, trained in veterinary science and practised as a veterinarian for 47 years, and became one of Australia's best known and outspoken animal welfare advocates. He had now been a council member for RSPCA Victoria from 1969, and President from 1972.

He was the first non-European to hold the position as president of the World Society for the Protection of Animals (now known as World Animal Protection).

On the live export trade Wirth was a staunch opponent arguing "that the animal is killed in an Australian abattoir. Subject to head-only stunning so that it meets the Koran's demands." Similarly, Wirth opposed duck hunting calling it cruel and unnecessary and no longer an acceptable cultural practice for Victorians. In March 2011 Wirth said that RSPCA Australia would investigate all reports of animal cruelty resulting from the Eden Park Kangaroo Cull and also said herding of kangaroos, which has been reported as part of the kangaroo cull, was in breach of a Victorian kangaroo management plan compiled by the DSE and approved by the RSPCA years ago.

== Honours ==
Wirth was appointed a Member of the Order of Australia (AM) on 10 June 1985 "for service in the field of animal welfare particularly with the Royal Society for the Prevention of Cruelty to Animals (RSPCA)".

In 1988, Wirth was the first Australian to receive the George T. Angell Humanitarian Award from the Massachusetts Society for the Prevention of Cruelty to Animals (MSPCA).

Wirth was named Victorian of the Year in 1997.

== Published works ==
- Wirth, Hugh (1995). Living with Dogs: A Commonsense Guide. HarperCollins. ISBN 978-0-7333-2888-6.
- Wirth, Hugh (1997). Living With Cats: A Commonsense Guide. HarperCollins. ISBN 978-0-7333-2889-3.
- Wirth, Hugh; Crawford, Anne (2012). Doctor Hugh: My Life With Animals. Sydney, Australia: Allen & Unwin. ISBN 978-1-7433-1104-2.
