= Inner North =

Studio album by The Guild League
- Released: 2004
- Genre: Indie pop
- Label: Candle Records

The Guild League chronology
Private Transport (2002)	Inner North (2004)	Speak Up (2008)

Professional ratings
Review scores
Source	Rating
Aversion.com	link
LAS magazine	7.5/10 link
Pitchfork Media	6.6/10 link
PopMatters	8/10 link
Splendid Magazine	link

Inner North is the second album by The Guild League released in 2004 on Candle Records (catalogue number TGL03), described by the band as "twelve songs about turning points, trust and the sky" .

== Track listing ==
1. "Animals"
2. "The Storm"
3. "Trust"
4. "Citronella"
5. "Shot in the Arm"
6. "Why Wait?"
7. "Time Please Gents"
8. "Scientists"
9. "Fingers of Sun"
10. "Falling Ovation"
11. "Where Are You Now?"
12. "Shirtless Sky"
