= The Guild League =

Pop band from Melbourne

- Origin: Melbourne, Victoria, Australia
- Genre: Indie pop
- Years active: 2001–2012
- Labels: Candle; Matinée
- Past members: Tali White; Cressida Griffith; Rodrigo Pintos-Lopez; Gerry Eeman; Phil Collings; Gus Rigby; Roger Clark

The Guild League was an Australian indie pop band which included material from rap style ("Siamese Couplets") to a cappella works. It was led by Tali White on lead vocals (of the Lucksmiths), initially as a side project, from 2001. The band released three albums Private Transport (2002), Inner North (2004) and Speak Up (2008). In 2012, the group disbanded but occasionally reformed for one-off performances.

== History ==
The Guild League was formed in 2001 as an indie pop side project in Melbourne by White on lead vocals. A three-track extended play, Jet-set...Go!, was released in 2002 via Matinée Records. One of the other musicians was Richard Easton on guitar. Karen E Graves of AllMusic observed it was "a teaser for things yet to come... [the group] exist in a world of delightful acoustic pop, drawn out in exquisite detail by White's quirky travelog-style lyrics""

The band's first album, Private Transport (2002), is credited to 16 musicians from Australia and the United States. White provided lead vocals, drums, guitar, percussion and piano. He explained to Kath Ogovany of Australian Music Info how "I was in San Francisco for about four months and in between some Lucksmiths tours and had some time on my hands and had some friends who were willing to muck around so we started recording this album there and when I got back to Australia The Luckies were having a pretty relaxed sort of year… so I recorded the rest of it with a whole lot of good friends here."

Private Transport was issued by Matinée in United States and the now-defunct Candle Records in Australia. It included the track, "Siamese Couplets", which featured "Australian-accented rapping". While the album's last track, "A Faraway Place", was "a dazzling near-a cappella tune". Apart from Easton and White, other musicians included Clare Bowditch on backing vocals, Marty Brown (of Clare Bowditch Band, Art of Fighting) on drums, Pete Cohen (of Sodastream) on bass guitar, double bass and backing vocals, Brent Kenji (of the Fairways) on guitar, Jaime Knight (of #Poundsign#, Dear Nora) on guitar, Craig Pilkington (of the Killjoys) on guitar and Alicia Vanden Heuvel (of #Poundsign#, the Aislers Set) on bass guitar.

The band had reduced in size by 2004 when a second album, Inner North, was released. It was recorded by the line-up of Brown, Pilkington, White, Cressida Griffith on cello and bass, Rodrigo Pintos-Lopez on guitar and Gus Rigby on tenor saxophone and baritone saxophone. AllMusic's James Christopher Monger rated it at four-out-of-five stars and opined "beautiful and fluid Inner North. Sophomore records are notoriously spotty, if only because the listener's first exposure to the group is their only frame of reference, so when a loosely assembled 'supergroup' puts out a second record that sounds like a veteran, joined-at-the-hip 'band,' it's all the more impressive."

In November 2006, the line-up was Griffith, Rigby and White with Roger Clark on trumpet, Phil Collings on drums and Gerry Eeman (also in Basic Shape) on guitar. A their third album, Speak Up, was issued on 12 October 2008. An editorial review at Amazon says it "is the sound of a band full of optimism and new ideas. There's a little bit for everyone... [it] mixes guitars with strings, keyboards, bursts of trumpet and saxophone, wonderful female backing vocals, and handclaps, all complemented by Tali's crystal clear and perfectly pitched vocals." White is the main songwriter for the band, writing all lyrics. Music is written either solely by White, or in collaboration with others including Pintos-Lopez, Eeman or Collings.

Aaron Zelinsky claimed in March 2009 on his blog for Huffington Post that US President Barack Obama had adapted the lyric, "The quiet burden of your absence", from the Guild League's song, "Shirtless Sky" from Inner North, in his inaugural address to Congress.

By May 2011, the group was rarely playing together. White told Jack Franklin of The Beat magazine how there are "...six of us in the band and all of us have hundreds of other things on our plates, so it's always a big joy when we can get together. It's just going to be fun to play the songs again. We still really love playing them – they're good songs – so hopefully people come along and hear them, yeah. We would love to get another gig in this year but I've got a baby on the way and Cressida (cellist/bassist) had a child in February, so we're very new to that; Phil's (drums) got another kid on the way so, there's a lot of kids going on – but we will try and get another gig in this year if possible."

== Discography ==
=== Albums ===
- Private Transport (2002)
- Inner North (2004)
- Speak Up (2008)

=== Extended plays ===
- Jet-set...Go! (2002)
