= Basic Shape =

Australian indie/pop/folk band

- Origin: Melbourne, Victoria, Australia
- Genres: Indie folk-rock
- Years active: 2002–2010
- Labels: Independent/MGM
- Past members: Mickey Carney; Gerry Eeman; Mal Beveridge; John Fredericks; Ege; Catherine Kohn; Robert Callea; Pav Chudiak; Daniel Ferguson; John Bedoe

Basic Shape were an Australian indie, pop and folk band, which formed in 2002 by founding mainstays Mickey Carney on guitar and backing vocals and Garry Eeman on lead vocals and guitar. They issued their debut album, Boat Without a Sail, in April 2008. Since mid-2010 they have not performed publicly.

== History ==
Basic Shape were centred on the song-writing partnership of Mickey Carney and Garry Eeman. The indie folk-rock band were formed in September 2002 in Melbourne when Eeman was offered a gig slot at local music venue Bar Open. Eeman invited friends from Northern Melbourne Institute of TAFE (NMIT) music program to play the show with him, which became the group's initial line-up. By the following year Carney and Eeman had been joined by Mal Beveridge, Catherine Kohn and John Fredericks; they entered Triple J's Unearthed talent competition.

Their debut album Boat Without a Sail was released in April 2008 through Green/MGM, and was Album of The Week on ABC Tasmania. Basic Shape's members were Carney on guitar and backing vocals, Eeman on lead vocals and guitar, Daniel Ferguson on keyboards, bass guitar and backing vocals, Robert Callea on drums and percussion and Pav Chudiak on bass guitar and backing vocals. The album was recorded over three years at Audrey Studios and engineered and co-produced by Craig Pilkington from the Killjoys. Stephen Bisset of theDwarf.com.au observed its "layered and textured structures, lush production, and witty, thoughtful lyrics." Rated at 46/100 by Ed Butler of Wireless Bollinger, who explained "[it] is a mere step away from becoming something quite lovely, as each song is a completed checklist of simple goals to achieve, rather than flashes of intuition and creativity, and that reluctance to step outside the comfort zone, except on rare occasions, is all that holds this release back."

Basic Shape's first single from the album, "White Skin" (January 2008), was played on several ABC radio stations around Australia, and was declared Single of the Week by Melbourne's Beat Magazine. They toured Australia's east coast from late April to mid-May 2008. A second single, "Rainy Day", appeared in November. In the following month, the line up was Callea, Carney, Eeman (also in The Guild League) and John Beddoe.

== Members ==
- Mickey Carney: guitar, backing vocals
- Gerry Eeman: lead vocals, guitar
- Mal Beveridge
- John Fredericks
- Catherine Kohn
- Ege
- Robert Callea: drums, percussion
- Pav Chudiak: bass guitar, backing vocals
- Daniel Ferguson: keyboards, bass guitar, backing vocals
- John Bedoe

== Discography ==
=== Albums ===
- Boat Without a Sail (19 April 2008) – Basic Shape/MGM (BASIC01)

=== Singles ===
- "White Skin" (2008)
- "Rainy Day" (2008)
