= Melbourne Polytechnic =

Institute of higher education and vocational education in Melbourne, Australia

- Type: Polytechnic/TAFE/Higher Education Institute
- Established: 1912
- CE: Frances Coppolillo
- Faculty: 511 (2014 FTE)
- Administrative staff: 348.5 (2014 FTE)
- Students: 50,203 total enrolments (November 2014), including 6,284 offshore (2014)
- Location: Melbourne, Victoria, Australia
- Campus: multiple urban and rural – Preston, Collingwood, Epping, Fairfield, Heidelberg, Prahran, Greensborough
- Website: www.melbournepolytechnic.edu.au

Melbourne Polytechnic, formerly NMIT, is an institute of higher education and vocational education (TAFE) located in Melbourne, Australia that has been operating since 1912, and aided by a $19 million grant from the Victorian Government.

A wide selection of study options in vocational education are offered from short courses, pre-apprenticeships, apprenticeships, and traineeships through to certificates, diplomas, advanced diplomas, and onto higher education, tertiary degrees under the Australian Qualifications Framework. In 2013, there were 511 Full Time Equivalent (FTE) teaching staff and 348.5 (FTE) support staff employed by Melbourne Polytechnic delivering over 500 courses. There were 50,203 total enrolments as of November 2014 including 6,284 off-shore students at overseas partner institutions.

Melbourne Polytechnic is the largest provider of primary industry training in Victoria and one of the largest in Australia offering a diverse range of courses from practical short-courses to a Bachelor of Agriculture and Technology focusing on Viticulture, Agronomy, and Agribusiness.

== Management and organisation structure ==
Melbourne Polytechnic is managed by a board of eleven directors appointed by the Victorian State Government with the Chief Executive appointed by the board. Recent Chief Executives (CE) appointments have included Brian MacDonald (1988 – March 2012), Dr Andrew Giddy (March 2012 to March 2014), Ron Gauci (March 2014 – April 2015) and Rob Wood (from May 2015 – September 2017). On 20 October 2017, Frances Coppolillo was appointed as Chief Executive.

Currently, the CE has six direct reports comprising Academic Operations; Curriculum Innovation and Teaching Excellence; Student Engagement, International and Community Partnerships; Strategy, Performance and Governance; People and Corporate Services; and Infrastructure, Sustainability and Precincts.

== Faculties ==
Melbourne Polytechnic is structured with four faculties each containing a number of Vocational education and training (VET) Teaching Departments and Higher Education (Master, Bachelor and associate degrees and higher education diploma) programs. During 2014, under the interim CEO leadership of Ron Gauci, the Institute undertook a major restructure reducing the teaching faculties from six to four. An International Office coordinates enrolment and services provided to international students studying at Melbourne Polytechnic. Many of the bachelor's degree courses have associate degrees embedded within them for an interim qualification and exit point after 2 years study.

Faculty	VET Teaching Departments	Higher Education
Foundation and Prepraratory Studies	Vocational Pathways; Includes Auslan, science, Young Adult Migrant Education Courses (YAMEC), VCAL: Foundation Studies; Includes General education for adults (CGEA), AMEP programs in spoken and written English.	
Food, Plant and Animal	Includes arboriculture, agriculture, civil construction, conservation and land management, Farriery, Floristry, horse breeding, horticulture, landscaping, meat processing, veterinary nursing, warehousing.	Associate Degree of Veterinary Nursing; Bachelor of Veterinary Nursing; Bachelor of Agriculture and Technology – Agronomy; Bachelor of Agriculture and Technology – Aquaculture; Bachelor of Agriculture and Technology – Agribusiness; Bachelor of Agriculture and Technology – Viticulture and Winemaking; Bachelor of Agriculture and Technology
Engineering, Design and Construction	Engineering; Includes courses in locksmithing, electrical studies, welding, information technology, manufacturing and mechanical engineering.: Building and Construction; Includes courses in bricklaying, carpentry, wall and floor tiling, wall and ceiling lining (plastering), plumbing, painting and decorating, waterproofing.: Design; Includes courses on building design, civil engineering drafting and design, building surveying and construction, interior design, joinery, shopfitting, stairbuilding, cabinet making and furniture making.	Sustainable Design and Construction: Associate Degree of Engineering Technology (Civil); Bachelor of Engineering Technology (Civil); Bachelor of the Built Environment
Health and Education	Includes courses on aged care, aromatherapy, community services work, disability, early childhood education, fitness, massage, pathology, sport development.	Diploma of Tertiary Studies – Higher Education; Associate Degree of Early Years Studies; Bachelor of Early Childhood Education; Bachelor of Education (Early Years and Primary)
Creative Arts	Performing Arts; Includes courses on community dance, costuming, digital media and interactive games, internet film production, live production, music, screen and media (TV production), sound production, specialist makeup services, theatre arts.: Visual Arts; Includes courses on beauty, creative product development, fashion design, graphic design, hairdressing, illustration, jewellery manufacture, painting, photography, writing and editing, visual merchandising.	Associate Degree of Illustration; Associate Degree of Music; Associate Degree of Music Industry; Associate Degree of Writing and Publishing; Bachelor of Illustration; Bachelor of Music; Bachelor of Music Industry; Master of Creative Arts
Business, Innovation and Entrepreneurship	Business and Hospitality (including Work Education); Includes courses on accounting, business, commerce, cookery, events, health administration, hospitality, international trade, legal practice and justice, marketing, mediation, office administration, property services, sports and recreation, tourism, work education.	Associate Degree of Accounting; Associate Degree of Business; Associate Degree of Hospitality Management; Associate Degree of Information Technology; Bachelor of Accounting; Bachelor of Business; Bachelor of Hospitality Management; Bachelor of Information Technology

== Courses ==
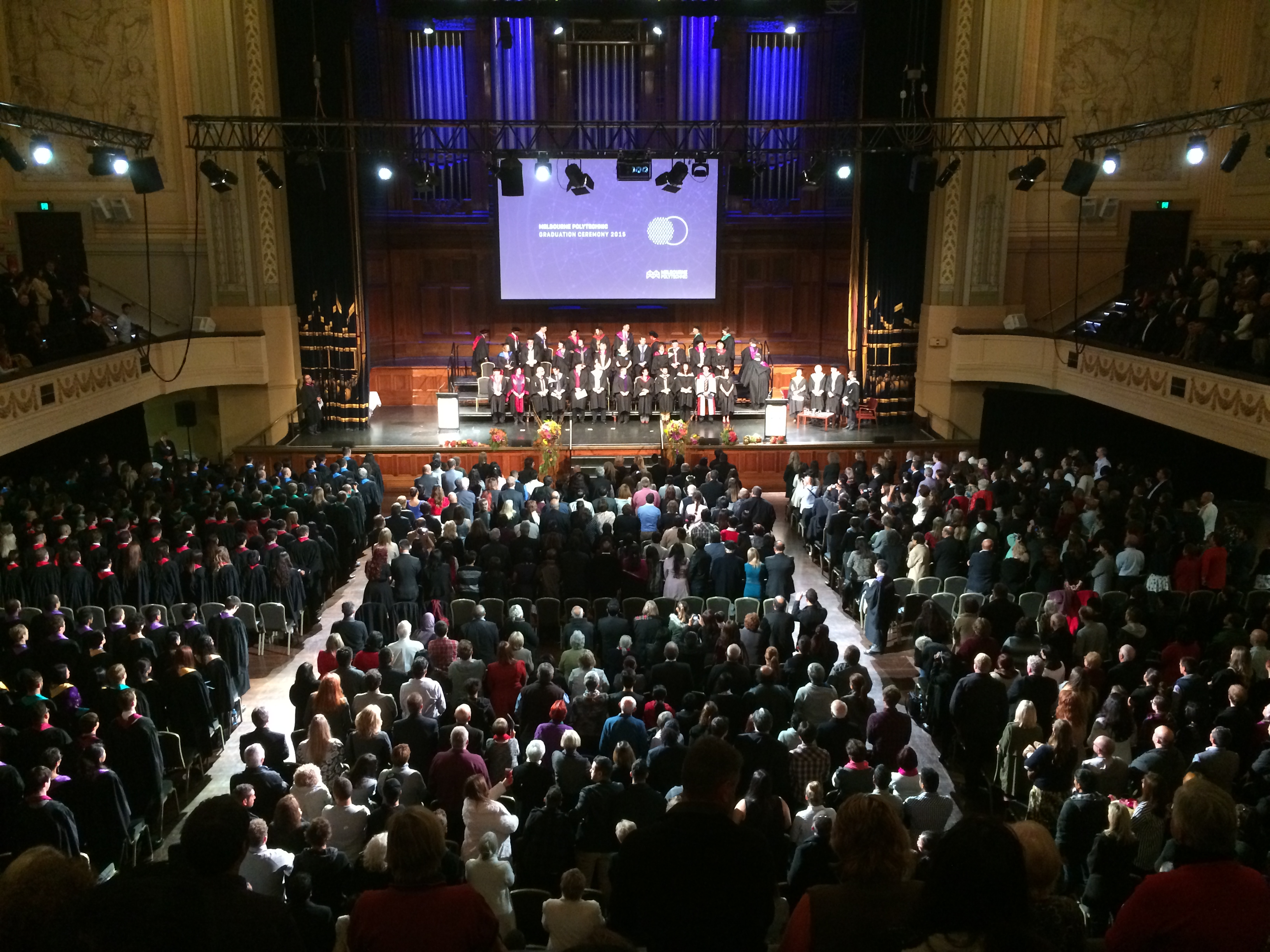
Graduands and Academic staff of Melbourne Polytechnic at the 2015 Graduation Ceremony at Melbourne Town Hall

=== Short courses ===
Short vocational courses are offered in a variety of areas including: Beauty, Drafting, Multimedia, Hospitality, HR, IT, massage, Office Administration, Welding, Microsoft Certified Professional (MCP) and Microsoft Certified Systems Engineer (MCSE), Computer Aided Drafting (CAD), and Cisco Certified Network Associate (CCNA) and Cisco Certified Network Professional (CCNP). Courses in IELTS – International English Language Testing system – are run from Preston and Collingwood campuses to enhance the English skills of students from non-English speaking backgrounds, particularly international students.

=== Certificate and diploma courses ===
As a major vocational education provider in Melbourne Melbourne Polytechnic offers Certificate, Diploma and Advanced Diploma Courses across all Faculties and teaching departments with many of the courses open for international students to enrol.

=== Degree courses ===
In 2002 the Victorian Education Minister, Lynne Kosky, announced that TAFEs would be able to offer bachelor's degrees in specialised vocational areas not catered for by universities. Legislation was passed in 2003 and NMIT became the first Victorian TAFE to offer an undergraduate degree in 2004: The Bachelor of Applied Aquaculture course with the first students enrolling at the start of 2005.

Melbourne Polytechnic has since added undergraduate degree courses in Viticulture and Winemaking (2006), Equine Studies (2006), Australian Popular Music (2007), Hospitality Management (2008), Illustration (2008), Accounting (2011), and two in Early Years Education (2011). In 2012 new bachelor's degrees are being launched in Business, Information Technology, and Music Industry.

Associate Degrees are also offered in Accounting, Agriculture and Technology, Business, Early Years Studies, Equine Studies, Illustration, Information Technology, International Business, and International Business Management, Music, Music Industry, Writing and Publishing, and Tertiary Studies.

The 2014 Annual report states that two new master's degree courses have been accredited by the Tertiary Education Quality and Standards Agency (TEQSA) for delivery: in Creative Industries, and Practising and Professional Accounting.

Bachelor of Accounting

Bachelor and associate degree program in Accounting started in 2011, with a particular focus on a sustainability and environmental management.

Bachelor of Agriculture and Technology – Aquaculture

The Bachelor of Aquaculture at Melbourne Polytechnic was the first full-time course in applied aquaculture and aquatic environmental management at the bachelor's degree level to be offered by a Victorian TAFE institute. Aquaculture research has included captive breeding of Murray cod and biodiesel from microalgae as part of this degree program. In 2014 this degree became the Bachelor of Agriculture and Technology, delivered by Melbourne Polytechnic, but accredited by La Trobe University.

Bachelor of Agriculture and Technology – Viticulture and Winemaking

Melbourne Polytechnic has been running wine training at its Epping campus since 1993 and in the Yarra Valley since 1994. The Bachelor of Viticulture and Winemaking degree commenced in February 2006 using the marketing label of Australian College of Wine, established by NMIT in 2001 to enable training in viticulture, winemaking and hospitality. This label was discontinued in favour of the Northern Estates label, launched in 2010. In 2014 this degree became the Bachelor of Agriculture and Technology, delivered by Melbourne Polytechnic, but accredited by La Trobe University.

Bachelor of Agriculture and Technology – Agronomy, Bachelor of Agriculture and Technology – Agribusiness

The former Bachelor of Agriculture and Land Management degree was reformulated in 2014 as the Bachelor of Agriculture and Technology, delivered by Melbourne Polytechnic, but accredited by La Trobe University. It has majors in Agronomy and Agribusiness.

Bachelor of Built Environment

A new degree in architecture launched in the second semester of 2015.

Bachelor of Business

The Bachelor of Business commenced enrolments in 2012.

Bachelor of Education (Early Years), Bachelor of Early Years Studies

In 2011 the Institute offered 2 Bachelor's degrees in early childhood education: a 4-year Bachelor of Education (Early Years) degree, a 3-year Bachelor of Early Years Studies, and a 2-year associate degree in Early Years Studies. They are the first training courses run by a TAFE Institute in Victoria that has achieved registration with the Victorian Institute of Teaching.

Bachelor of Equine Studies

The degree in Equine studies has been hailed as the first course of its kind in Australia and a forerunner in higher education needed to professionalise the equine industry. Previous courses were only available at the Certificate or Diploma level at a variety of regional TAFEs. The course is based at Melbourne Polytechnic's 300 hectares (741 acres) thoroughbred stud, Northern Lodge, north of Melbourne, which has sold its yearlings for up to $125,000 as part of its commercial activities. Northern Lodge was established in 1993 comprising 70 hectares (173 acres)plus an adjoining 270 hectares (667 acres) property on a long term-lease for the stud farm, training track and a vineyard.

Bachelor of Engineering Technology (Civil)

Civil Engineering bachelor and associate degree course program delivered from 2014.

Bachelor of Hospitality Management

The Bachelor of Hospitality Management commenced in 2008. The course integrates hospitality management and business management, and utilises Melbourne Polytechnic's specialist hospitality industry facilities and resources in conjunction with Hospitality Certificate and Diploma level courses.

Bachelor of Information Technology

The Bachelor of Information Technology commenced enrolments in 2012.

Bachelor of Music

The 3-year bachelor's degree include studies in jazz, classical, pop/rock, and world music and is structured around four strands : music tools and language; music practice; applying music technology and music and culture; and creativity and the music business. The course is taught by musicians and music educators: Eugene Ball and Adrian Sherriff. It joins the other music industry courses at the Certificate, Diploma and Advanced Diploma levels that have been offered by Melbourne Polytechnic since 1986 in sound production, music business, and music performance. Melbourne Polytechnic has also introduced online courses in Songwriting, Arranging and Copyright for musicians which are units in its National Music Training Package.

Bachelor of Music Industry

The three-year Bachelor of Music Industry degree was launched in 2011, with ARIA award-winning musician Greg Arnold as the first academic program head. Students are able to select a major to specialise in including songwriting, sound production or music management.

Associate Degree of Veterinary Nursing

In 2015 Melbourne Polytechnic launched an associate degree of Veterinary Nursing based at the Epping campus, with new Veterinary training facilities. While Veterinary Nursing degrees have been offered for about 14 years in Great Britain, this is the first of its type to be presented in Australia.

Myerscough College in the UK advised upon and reviewed the degree program materials for the course. An agreement with the Lort Smith Animal Hospital in North Melbourne provides clinical placements and an end of course internship program for students.

Master of Creative Industries The Master of Creative Industries curriculum model is based upon three thematic streams. These are (1) Entrepreneurship and Commercialisation (2), Applied Creative Research and (3) Creative Practice and Interdisciplinarity.

=== Official/authorised test centres ===
Melbourne Polytechnic has two official test centres.

- IELTS (International English Language Testing System) for IELTS-General and IELTS-Academic English proficiency tests at the Preston campus, with offsite some offsite testing..
- Pearson VUE – offering tests in PTE-Academic, CPA, CCNA, ICND1, ICND2, MSCE . Other tests are offered from time to time.

== Graduation colours ==
At the yearly graduation ceremony graduates (Diploma and above) are presented their qualification in academic dress. The Melbourne Polytechnic board approved the following colours to represent the different fields of study (colour samples are approximate):

Academic Colour	Field of study	Sample
Ruby	Applied Art including Visual Arts, Vocational Pathways	
Cherry	Building including Design, Drafting and Interior Fittings	
Ultramarine	Business including Business Services, Commerce, Information Technology, Office Administration	
Parma violet	Engineering including computer systems and electrotechnology, civil engineering, mechanical manufacturing	
Burnt Orange	Koorie	
Fuchsia	Performing Arts including music	
Jade	Personal Services including Hospitality, Personal Services, Tourism	
Spectrum Green	Rural Studies and Horticulture including Agriculture and animal science, Horticulture	
Buttercup	Social and Community Services including Children's Services, Community Health and Wellbeing	

== International partnerships ==
Melbourne Polytechnic is a global vocational education and training provider and offers qualifications in partnership with institutions in China, Hong Kong, Bangladesh, Sri Lanka, The Republic of Korea, India, Pakistan, Columbia and New Zealand. Students graduated in 2009 from NMIT programs at the following partner universities and colleges: Dalian Jiaotong University, Hangzhou Vocational and Technology College, Insurance Professional College, IEN-Start Institute Minjiang University, Jiyuan Vocational College, Luoyang University, Nanchang Hangkong University, Ocean University of China, Shandong Economic University, Sichuan College of Architectural Technology, Suzhou Vocational College, Taiyuan University of Technology, Xi'an Polytechnic University, Yunnan Institute of Information Technology, Zhejiang University of Technology, Zhongshan College, Huainan Normal University, Hong Kong Universal Education, Ansan College of Technology, Changshin College, Kunjang College, Suncheon Cheongam College, Saekyung College.

In 2014, 2,617 students graduated from offshore partner institutes in China, Hong Kong and Korea. In 2015, offshore graduates numbered 2,293.

== History ==
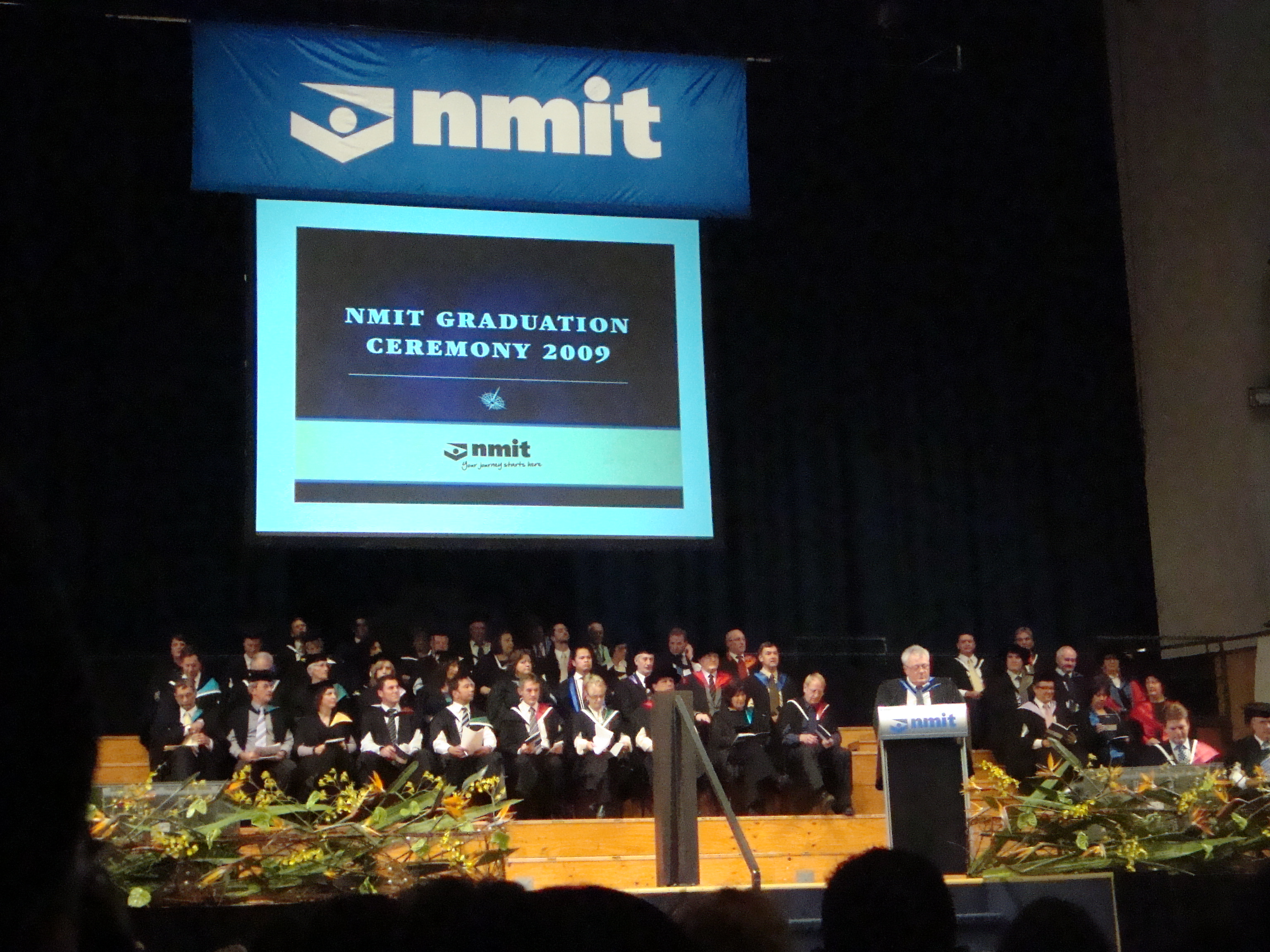
Academic staff of Northern Melbourne Institute of TAFE (NMIT) on the stage at the 2009 Graduation Ceremony, with CEO Brian MacDonald speaking

The direct antecedents of Melbourne Polytechnic are Northern Melbourne Institute of TAFE, and further back in time Preston College of TAFE and Collingwood College of TAFE which amalgamated in 1988. The new organisation was called Northern Metropolitan College of TAFE. Initial campuses were at Preston, Collingwood and Parkville with the Institute developing new campuses at Heidelberg, Greensborough and Epping. Other organisations have sometimes taken the NMIT acronym to mean Northern Metropolitan Institute of Technology, however this has never been an official title.

The Epping Campus was developed and built in 1992. At the time the Institute were planning delivery of part-time, night-time horticulture programs. The Victorian Government, as part of a policy direction, stipulated courses needed to be also delivered in agriculture. From that point NMIT developed the resources to become the pre-eminent agricultural training organisation in Victoria by 2005.

=== Northern Melbourne Institute of TAFE ===
NMIT logo from 1999 to 2014.

A further name change to Northern Melbourne Institute of TAFE occurred in 1996, with the NMIT acronym adopted in 1999. Training centres at Eden Park and Yan Yean were developed. In 2002 a campus was opened in Ararat on the site of the Aradale Mental Hospital, and a new training centre at Yarra Glen in the Yarra Valley region. In 2004 the Parkville campus closed and a new campus opened at Fairfield on the site of the Fairfield Infectious Diseases Hospital.

In 2005 NMIT upgraded its telephone system from a Fujitsu telephone branched exchange to a full internet telephony network at a cost of about A$5 million. To enhance its negotiating power and technical support base for implementing a Voice over Internet Protocol (VOIP) system, NMIT lead a consortium of regional TAFEs (Gordon Institute of TAFE from Geelong, Bendigo Regional Institute of TAFE, Goulburn Ovens Institute of TAFE and Wodonga Institute of TAFE) in migrating to the new telephony system.

The first Higher Education graduates from NMIT Bachelor's degree programs were awarded their bachelor's degrees in Applied Aquaculture, Viticulture and Winemaking and Equine Studies at the 2009 NMIT Graduation Ceremony.

In the wake of the shakeup in Government funding to TAFE Victoria in 2012, NMIT is negotiating sale of its Greensborough campus and purchase of Swinburne University's Prahran campus in 2013. In the agreement signed with Swinburne University on 2 August 2013, NMIT will develop the campus as a precinct for creative arts. NMIT plans an initial 60 courses to be run from the campus from 2014. The National Institute of Circus Arts and Gymnastics Australia will remain as tenants on the site.

With the continued delivery of a range of Associate and bachelor's degree programs to complement its vocational education courses, NMIT indicated in 2013 that it is moving toward Polytechnic University status. In August 2013 NMIT and La Trobe University announced the establishment of Melbourne Polytechnic based at Prahan Campus.

=== Collingwood Technical School ===
The antecedents of Melbourne Polytechnic date back to a trade skills crisis in Victoria in the initial years of the twentieth century resulting in the passing of the 1910 Education Act No 2301 in the Victorian Parliament. This act allowed the establishment of technical schools.

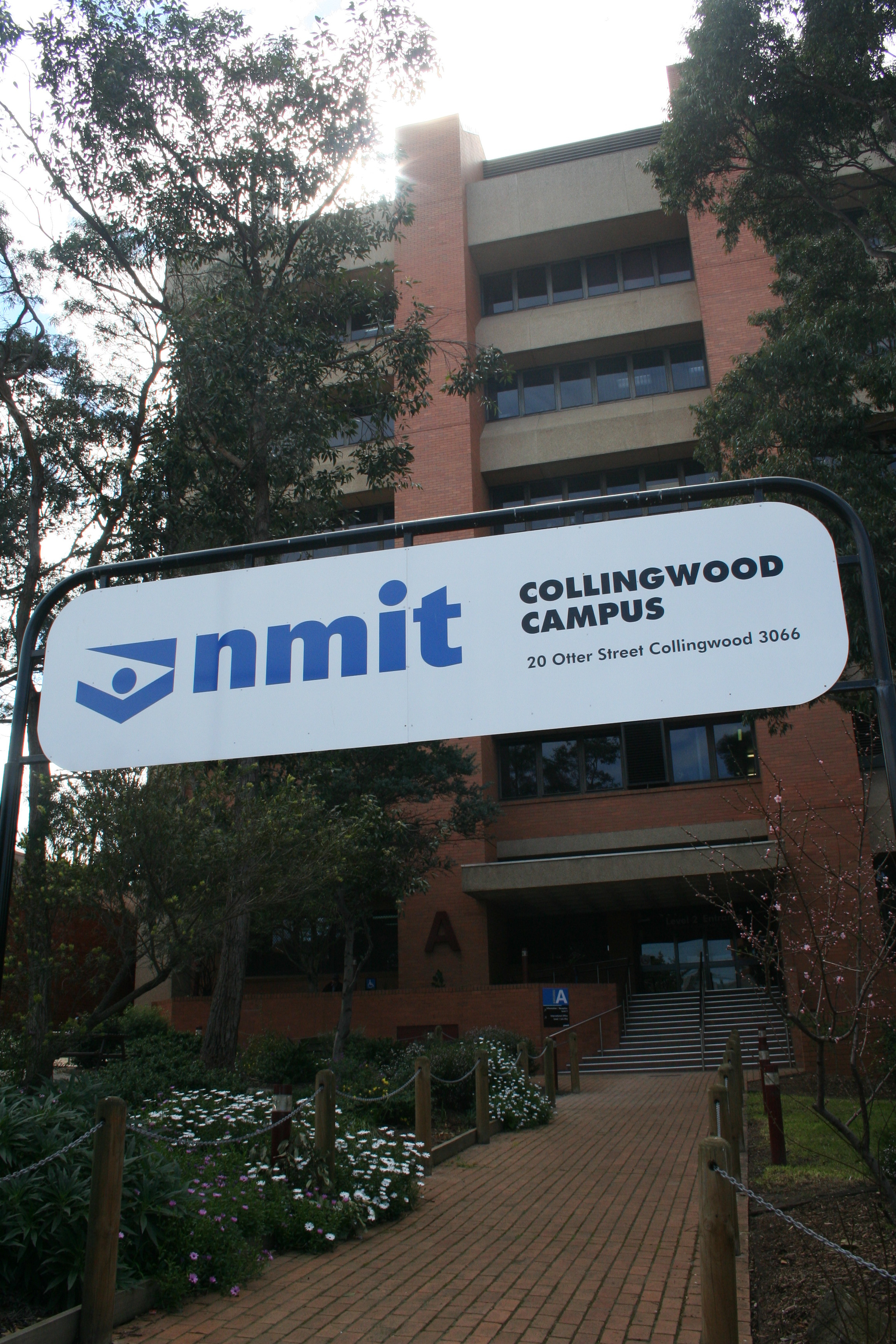
Collingwood Campus of NMIT

Collingwood Technical School was established in July 1912 at 35 Johnston street. The bluestone buildings were originally built during the gold rush period in 1853 as the Collingwood Town Hall and Court House. Initial subjects studied included preliminary carpentry and pattern-making, plumbing, engineering, sheet iron work and bricklaying with students studying 2 hours per night, 3 nights a week.

Juniors enrolled at the start of 1913, and the school was classified as a trades school by the Victorian Education Department, offering courses in carpentry, fitting and turning, plumbing, bricklaying and plastering. Two years later electrical wiring and electrical and mechanical engineering were introduced.

During the First World War the school was also used for retraining returning servicemen.

In 1935, the junior school was the largest technical school in Melbourne with 788 enrolments, and with a total enrolment of 1769, but the establishment of Preston Technical School in 1937 reduced subsequent demand.

The school was renamed Collingwood Technical College in 1968.

To address a shortage of skilled gardeners, the college started its horticultural studies program at Parkville in 1979, with an initial 96 apprentices enrolled. The following year, 1980, the new nine-story Otter Street Campus building was completed. The school had 8000 full-time and part-time students enrolled in TAFE courses at Collingwood.

The Minister of Education announced the closure of the school at the end of 1987 citing falling enrolments from 800 in 1963 to 200 in 1985, to 100 in 1987.

=== Preston Technical School ===
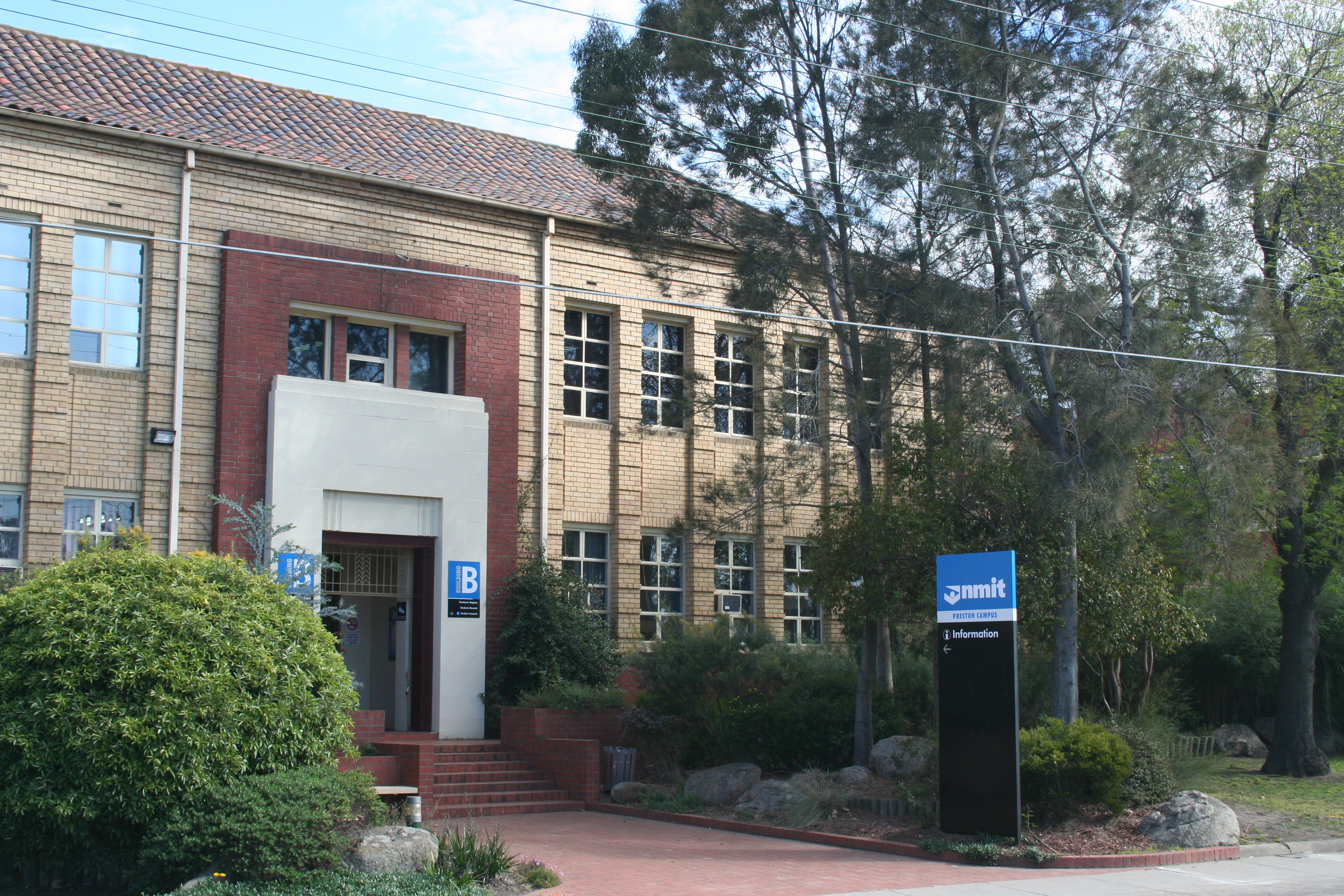
Preston Campus building B housing NMIT Administration.

The Victorian Government opened the Preston Technical School in 1937 on land provided by Preston Council on St Georges Rd, and also supported by Northcote Council. After World War Two substantial expansion occurred with new workshop premises opened in 1947, followed by a Girls' Technical School in the mid 1950s. In 1951 Preston was the largest technical school in Victoria.

The 1950s also saw the introduction of the Preston Diploma School offering tertiary Diploma courses in engineering and science. By 1977 the combined school offered 100 courses. By 1987 the school was known as Preston College of TAFE and had 17,000 students enrolled prior to its amalgamation with Collingwood Technical College in 1988 to form the Northern Metropolitan College of TAFE.

Building B on Preston Campus, that fronts St Georges Road, has been listed on the Victorian Heritage Database for its local historic, aesthetic and social significance to Darebin City. The listing states:

Historically, the school provides evidence of the educational faciliies [sic] established to meet the educational needs of the growing municipalities of Northcote and Preston in the Inter-war years. It is also significant as a place that illustrates the development of technical colleges during the inter-war period. It is significant as an example of a school designed under the direction of notable Chief Architect, Percy Everett. Architecturally, the former Preston Technical College is a relatively intact and good example of a substantial Education Department secondary school building from the Inter-war years. The Stripped Classical composition of its east (St Georges Road) elevation is of note, which is layered with materials and embellishment that are found on Moderne and Mediterranean style buildings, creating an interesting hybrid of styles.

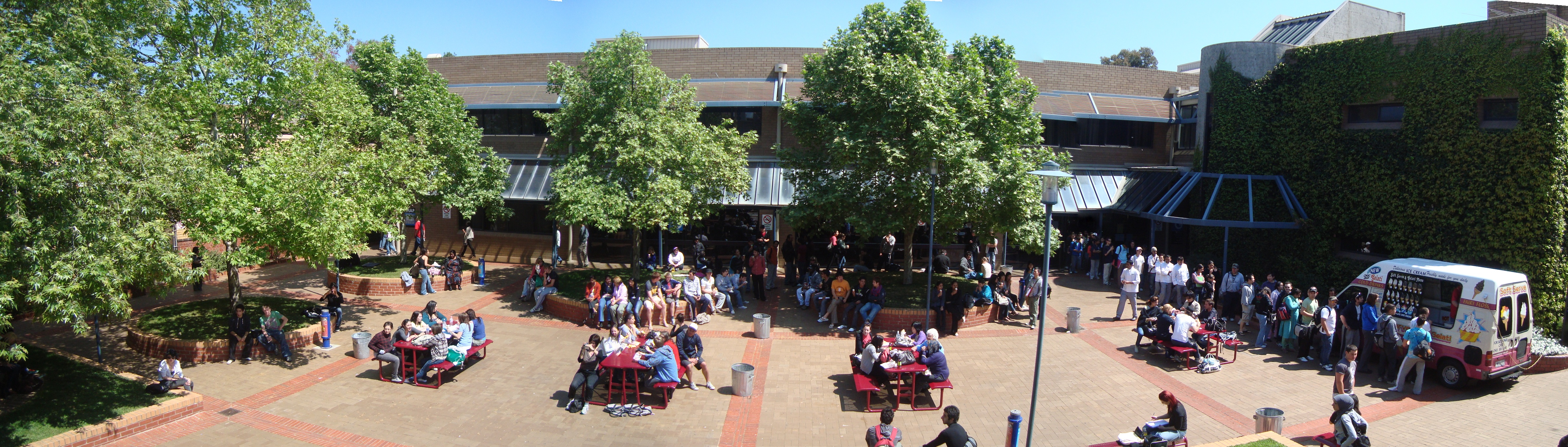
Preston Campus Quadrangle at lunch time

== Campuses ==
The institute's main campus and administration is located at Preston on St Georges Road.

=== Preston ===
Set on the site of Preston Technical School, this campus offers a variety of courses and facilities, including a Gym and football oval. Courses include information technology, hospitality and tourism, business and office administration, massage and hairdressing. The Hospitality Department runs a Tourism and Hospitality Training Centre which provides training bars, commercial kitchens and a simulated hotel foyer, front desk, hotel suite and the St Georges Restaurant and bistro which is run as a successful commercial venture.

The Centre of Excellence for Students who are Deaf and Hard of Hearing is based at the Preston Campus. The centre was set up in 1993 by the Office of Training and Further Education (OTFE), later renamed Skills Victoria. The Centre's aim is to provide leadership, support and research to the Vocational Education and Training (VET) sector on the needs of Deaf and hard of hearing students in Victoria.

=== Collingwood ===
Located in an 8-storey tower in Otter Street, close to Smith Street, the Collingwood campus offers courses in information technology, multimedia, video production, hairdressing and contains the International Students office. A Cafeteria is located on the 3rd floor along with the Level 3 Bistro which hospitality students run during term times. IELTS testing was conducted at Collingwood until 2016, off-site testing is conducted on market demand. The campus also features an industry standard high definition television broadcast studio. The campus temporarily shares its space with the Academy of Design Australia, a privately owned design college belonging to LaSalle College, before its relocation to Oxford Street, Collingwood.

The campus was temporarily closed in October 2022 to be renovated, with an expected opening date in early 2024.

=== Fairfield ===
Fairfield Campus is located on the site of the former Fairfield Infectious Diseases Hospital, and many of the hospital's original buildings converted for student use. Facilities at the Fairfield Campus include photography studios and darkrooms, recording studios and fully equipped computer laboratories. Courses in illustration, visual arts, performing arts, Music Business and horticulture are based at Fairfield.

In 2008 and 2009 work was undertaken in redeveloping the old nurses quarters for student residential accommodation. Yarra House on Fairfield campus was officially opened for residential student accommodation in 2010. A common room is named after Vivian Bullwinkel, an Australian Army nurse and later the Director of Nursing at the Fairfield Hospital.

There is an AIDS Memorial Garden located in parklands adjacent to the campus where the ashes of at least 50 people are scattered. The garden was established on 22 April 1988 as a place of tranquillity and respite for patients in the AIDS Ward at the former Fairfield Infectious Diseases Hospital and their families and friends.

=== Greensborough ===
The Greensborough Campus has gardens which are developed and maintained by students of the Landscape Gardening course.

The campus was closed in 2013 with management citing declining enrolments at the campus as the reason. Labor leader Daniel Andrews promised to re-open the campus during the 2014 Victorian state election, either by Melbourne Polytechnic or another training provider.

=== Heidelberg ===
The Heidelberg campus contains the Manufacturing, Engineering and Building Industry Training Centre which was custom built in 1994. The technologically advanced training facilities provides workshops for each trade area allowing students to learn in an environment similar to real work situations using equipment and fittings donated by industry. The plumbing training facilities include a plumbing sandpit, simulated house stations and an advanced gas training laboratory.

Melbourne Polytechnic provides the only locksmithing apprenticeship course in Victoria at its Heidelberg campus which attracts students from as far afield as Tasmania, South Australia, the Northern Territory and New Zealand. The Heidelberg Technical Education Centre (TEC), one of four in Victoria, opened at NMIT Heidelberg campus in May 2010.

=== Epping ===
The campus was initially developed in 1992 with State Government funding. NMIT has become the largest provider in Victoria of training to the agriculture sector with courses delivered from the Epping Campus located on Melbourne's northern rural fringe. Epping Campus is home to award-winning courses in beef, goat, sheep and grain production. The campus also has welding workshops, a forklift training area, glass houses for herb production, a winery and hosts one of Victoria's few indoor recirculating aquaculture facilities. Students at courses at Epping also use the training facilities of a farm at Yan Yean and Northern Lodge, a 60 hectare horse stud and 8 hectare vineyard at Eden Park.

Green Skills Centre

The Epping campus has been home to Melbourne Polytechnic's centre for Renewable Energy and Sustainability for courses in renewable energy. In 2009/2010 a Green Skills Centre of Excellence was constructed on the Campus with $9.5million of Federal Government funding.

The building was opened in November 2010 and features green building design; renewable energy sources including Geothermal heat pump for heating and cooling and solar panels (25 kW); Rainwater harvesting and recycling; green concrete with low cement content; and Forest Stewardship Council (FSC) timber. Eighty per cent of the construction waste was recycled. The building has a Green Building Council of Australia GreenStar rating of 5 signifying 'Australian Excellence' in sustainable building design. The building is used for a range of courses teaching sustainable practices and technologies including in "carbon trading, solar power and solar water heating, wind power generation, geothermal exchange heating and cooling, blackwater and greywater treatment, rainwater harvesting, waste management and waste recycling, water resources management for horticulture, and agricultural and horticultural land conservation."

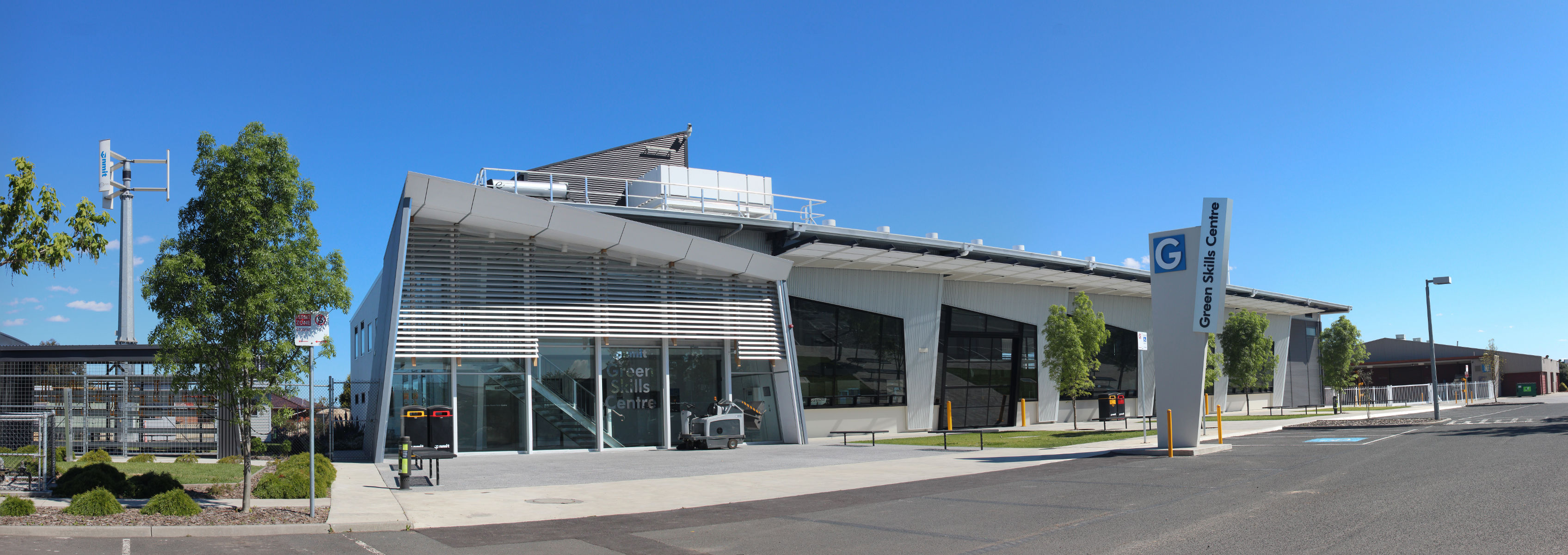
Green Skills Centre on Epping Campus

=== Prahran ===
In the wake of the reduction in Government funding support for the TAFE sector during 2012, Swinburne University of Technology indicated it wished to sell its Prahran and Lilydale campuses. After a period of due diligence, on 2 August 2013, NMIT signed an agreement to effect the transfer of the Prahran Campus from Swinburne University with in-principle state Government agreement, and to develop the site as a creative industries training precinct. As part of the agreement the National Institute of Circus Arts and Gymnastics Australia will remain as tenants on the site. According to NMIT CEO Andy Giddy, a teaching hotel offering student residential accommodation may be incorporated in the campus redevelopment.

=== Ararat ===
In November 2002 a new campus and 30 hectare vineyard and 10 hectare olive grove and olive processing facility was opened at the former Aradale Mental Hospital site near Ararat, near the Pyrenees wine region. The campus was established to provide in Victoria a wine and hospitality training facility. The campus accommodates up to 120 students, focusing on practical aspects of Wine Making, Marketing, Vineyard management and Food Processing (wine) subjects for its Certificate, Diploma and bachelor's degree courses.

=== Rural training centers ===
Eden Park

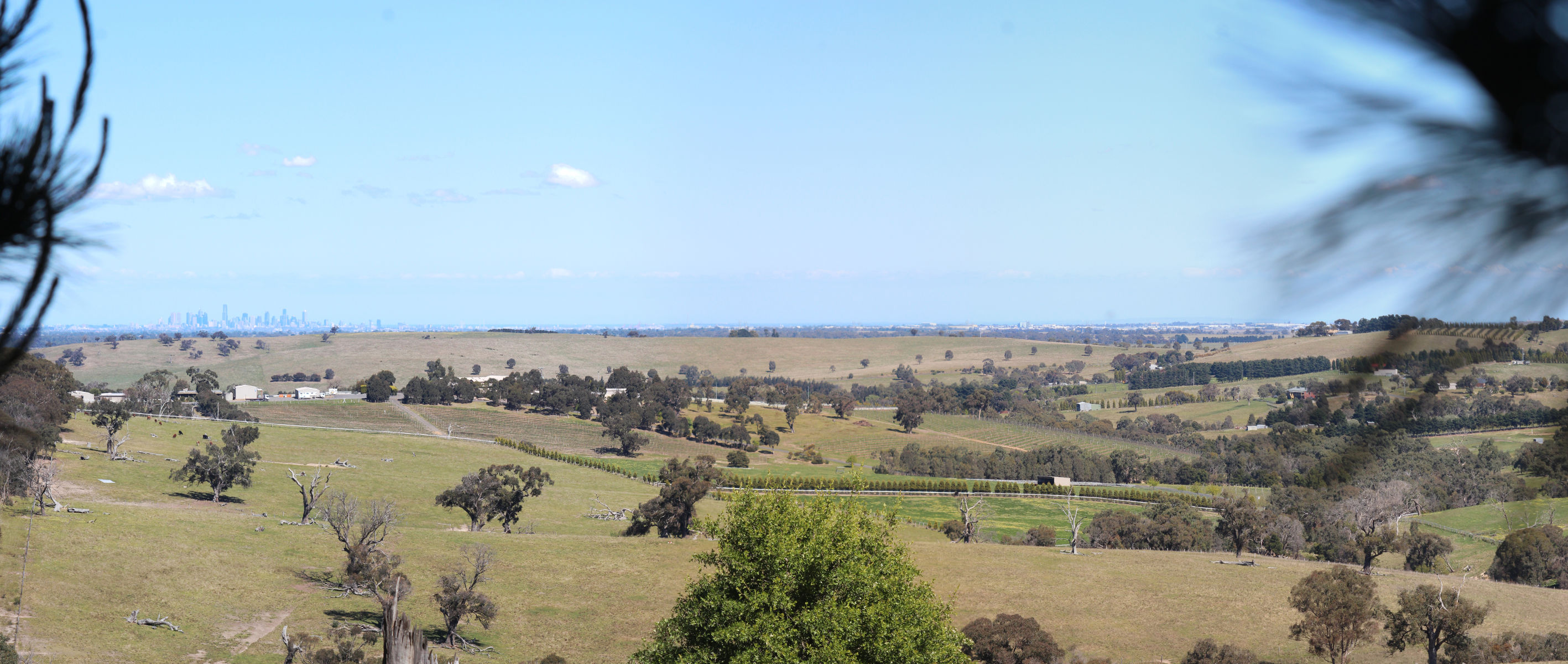
NMIT Northern Lodge Equine Stud with Melbourne CBD on the horizon

Northern Lodge is Melbourne Polytechnic's 320 hectare farm and horse stud at Eden Park located 40 kilometres north of Melbourne in the foothills of Victoria's Great Dividing Range. The farm provides training for thoroughbred racing and viticulture. Northern Lodge was established in 1993 and includes irrigated pastures, stables, barn, a 1400 metres running track, and other facilities. The first vineyard was planted by students in 1996 which has grown to 10 hectares including the varieties chardonnay, sauvignon blanc, semillon, riesling, pinot noir, shiraz, cabernet sauvignon and merlot.

During 2011 there have been community protests to stop the Eden Park Kangaroo Cull on the Melbourne Polytechnic Eden Park property.

Yan Yean

Melbourne Polytechnic operates a fully operational farming property at Yan Yean which is located 25 kilometres north of Melbourne. The 200 hectare property is dedicated to training students in cattle and deer farming, aquaculture and the production of medicinal herbs and essential oils.

Yarra Glen

Melbourne Polytechnic has 12 hectares of Vineyards located at the Yarra Valley Racing Centre, with a 100-tonne winery constructed there in 2003.

== Northern Estates wine ==
In 2001 the Victorian Government provided $7.4 million to NMIT to establish the Australian College of Wine, announcing a new teaching facility with 12 hectares of vines in the Yarra Valley wine region and a new campus and 30 hectares (74 acres) vineyard and 10 hectares (25 acres) olive grove and olive processing facility at the former Aradale Mental Hospital site near Ararat, near the Pyrenees wine region. The College was established to provide in Victoria a wine and hospitality training facility.

Some within the wine industry, such as the Yarra Valley Wine Growers Association, objected to the establishment of the Australian College of Wine, on the grounds that existing institutions: Charles Sturt University at Wagga Wagga in New South Wales, the University of Adelaide in South Australia and Swinburne University of Technology campus at Lilydale, produced enough graduates for the industry.

The NMIT Australian College of Wine campus at Aradale was officially opened by Education and Training Minister, Lynne Kosky in November 2002. The college accommodates up to 120 students, focusing on practical aspects of Wine Making, Marketing, Vineyard management and Food Processing (wine) subjects for its Certificate, Diploma and bachelor's degree courses.

Melbourne Polytechnic has taught various courses associated with winemaking and viticulture at its Epping campus since 1993 which has a 100 tonne winery a470 hectares (1,161 acres) and a licence to market and sell wine. NMIT students planted vines in 1996 at the NMIT owned 470-hectare thoroughbred stud, Northern Lodge, at Eden Park 40 km north of Melbourne. The first vintage was bottled in 1998. The first Gold Medal, for a 2002 Shiraz, was awarded in 2003 at the prestigious Royal Adelaide Wine Show. Numerous wine show awards have since been won for wines produced by NMIT students with the Australian College of Wine.

In 2003 new wineries of 100-tonne at both Eden Park and Yarra Glen and 250-tonne at Aradale were constructed as part of the development of the Australian College of Wine. State and Regional Development Minister John Brumby announced that NMIT would run a $1 billion viticulture training project at Panzhihua University in China's south-west from 2004.

The college was a member of the Grampians Winemakers Association and also was a major sponsor of the annual Grampians Gourmet Food and Wine Festival.

Last mention of the Australian College of Wine was in the 2006 Annual report. The Institute has since stopped marketing under this wine label, instead adopting the Northern Estates wine Label in 2010 when the Institute won a silver medal for a staff/student processed Northern Estates Riesling entered into the 2010 Canberra International Riesling Challenge. The new Northern Estates label was publicly launched at the Cellar Door and Farm Gate event at Southbank Wharf Precinct at Melbourne Food Week during 2010.

== Institute awards ==
- 2011 – A team of four NMIT cookery students won the Victorian Tafe Cookery Challenge
- 2010 – Australian Institute of Professional Photography Tertiary Institution of the Year Award
- 2008 – Australian Institute of Professional Photography Tertiary Institution of the Year Award
- 2007 Victorian Tourism Awards – Winner of Tourism Education and Training Award, Faculty of Hospitality, Tourism and Personal Services
- 2006 Australian Institute of Professional Photography (AIPP) Tertiary Institute Award
- Wines produced by NMIT students have won medals in the Australian Small Winemakers Show, Royal Hobart Wine Show, Royal Melbourne Wine Show, Victorian Wines Show, Royal Adelaide Show.

== Alumni ==
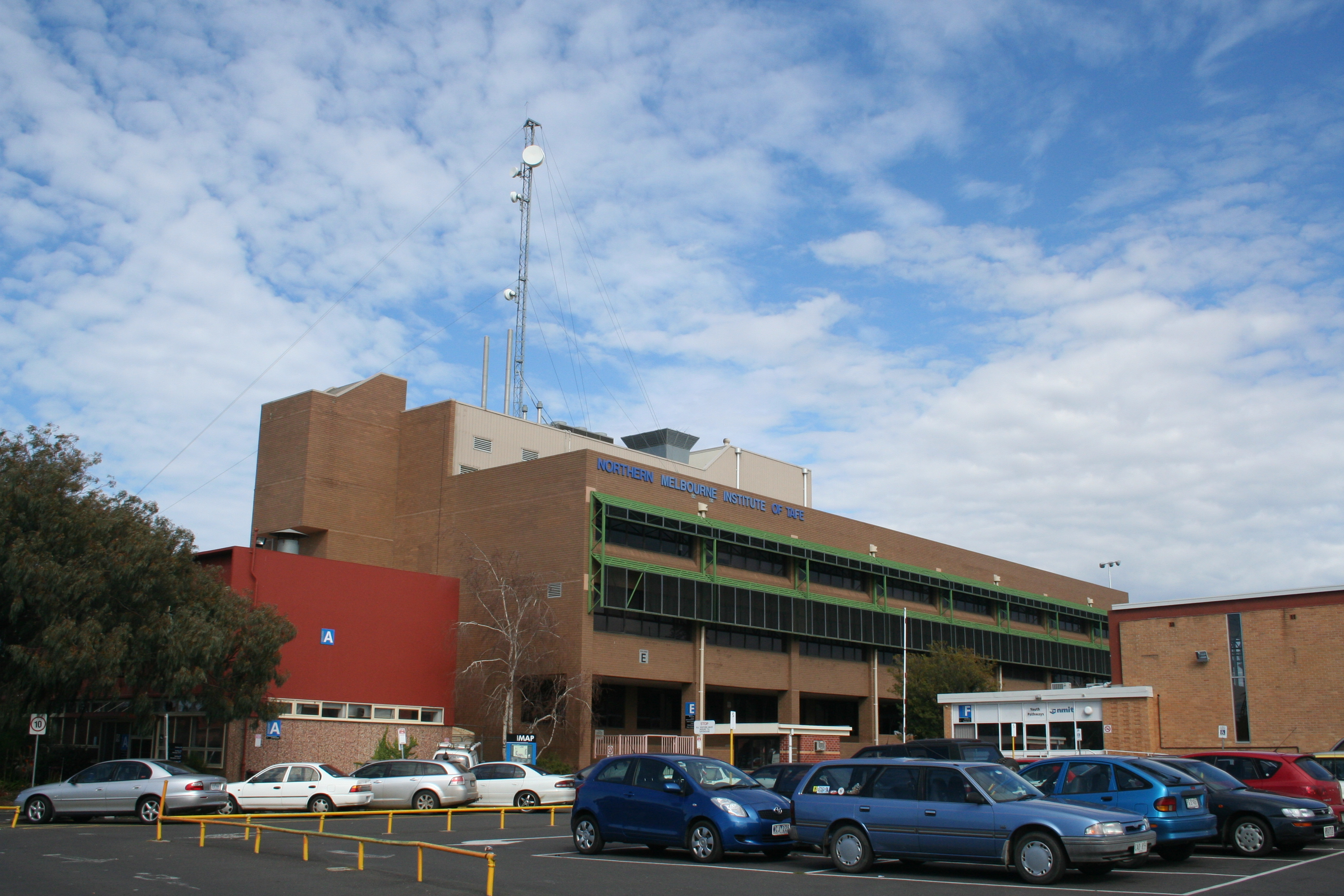
Preston Campus Building E of NMIT, from St Georges Road

Some of the notable people who have attended NMIT or its antecedents:

- Ron Barassi – Australian rules footballer and coach – student at Preston Technical School
- Basic shape – folk/pop/indie band whose members attended NMIT music courses
- Amy Findlay of Stonefield is a 2010 Music Degree graduate.
- Jon Faine – ABC broadcaster
- Chris Frangou – Bass player, composer and producer
- Frank Gibson – Professor of Biochemistry, Melbourne University, ANU – student at Collingwood Technical College
- Neil Harvey – vice-captained Australian cricket team – student at Collingwood Technical School
- Bill Lawry – captained Australian cricket team – student at Preston Technical School
- Chris Lewis – Circus Oz music director
- Arthur Mather (born 1925) cartoonist and novelist – student at Collingwood Technical School
- John O'Hagan – Circus Oz music director
- Edmond Amendola, David Williams, Adam Donovan – founding members of band Augie March
- Michael Pratt recipient of the George Cross for bravery – student at Preston Technical School
- Jasmine Rae – country singer and songwriter
- Lou Richards – Australian rules footballer – student at Collingwood Technical School
- Ron Richards – Australian rules footballer – student at Collingwood Technical School
- Stan Rofe – influential rock'n'roll disc jockey – student at Collingwood Technical School
- Tony Spizzica – Australian bass, piano accordion player and music teacher from Elmore in country Victoria
- Paul Stoddart – airline magnate – studied at Preston Technical School
- Frank Wilkes – politician and Victorian parliamentary Labor leader – student at Preston Technical School
- Marcel Yammouni – musical director of Vanessa Amorosi
- Deepak Vinayak- Indian Australian Community Leader, Melbourne
