= Private Transport =

Studio album by The Guild League
- Released: 2002
- Genre: Indie pop
- Label: Candle Records

The Guild League chronology
Private Transport (2002)	Inner North (2004)

Private Transport is the first album by The Guild League released in 2002 on Candle Records.

== Track listing ==
1. "Jet Set...Go!"
2. "The Neatest Hand "
3. "Cosmetropolis (London Swings)"
4. "Balham Rise"
5. "The Photographer"
6. "Baggage Handling"
7. "Dangerous Safety"
8. "What Adults Do"
9. "Siamese Couplets"
10. "Gravity"
11. "A Maze In Greys"
12. "Cornflakes"
13. "A Faraway Place"
