= Eden Park kangaroo cull =

Animal culling in Australia

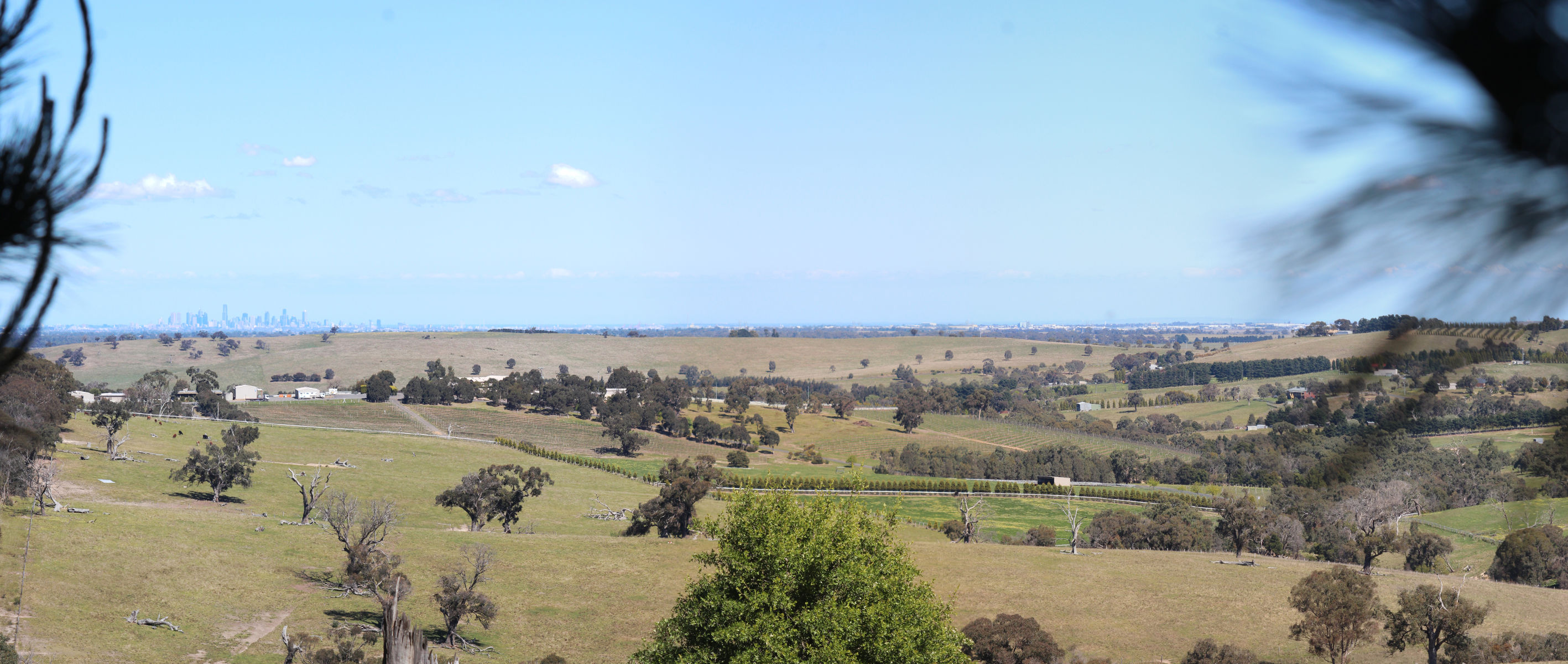
NMIT Northern Lodge Equine Stud and farm at Eden Park with Melbourne CBD on the horizon

During October 2010, the Northern Melbourne Institute of TAFE (NMIT) applied for and received a 12-month permit from the Victorian Department of Sustainability and Environment to cull 300 eastern grey kangaroos on its 320 hectare Eden Park Vineyard and farm and Northern Lodge equine stud. NMIT claimed that more than 1500 kangaroos were in competition for pasture, and damaging fencing, grapevines and netting.

The permit was issued under the Wildlife Act (1975) after NMIT commissioned wildlife management group Ecoplan to do an independent assessment which recommended a cull of 300 kangaroos each year for three years. The report by Ecoplan estimated 710 kangaroos were on the property, give or take 70, and suggested 900 kangaroos should be destroyed over three years. The report also recommended annual counts be conducted in June or July.

== Opposition ==
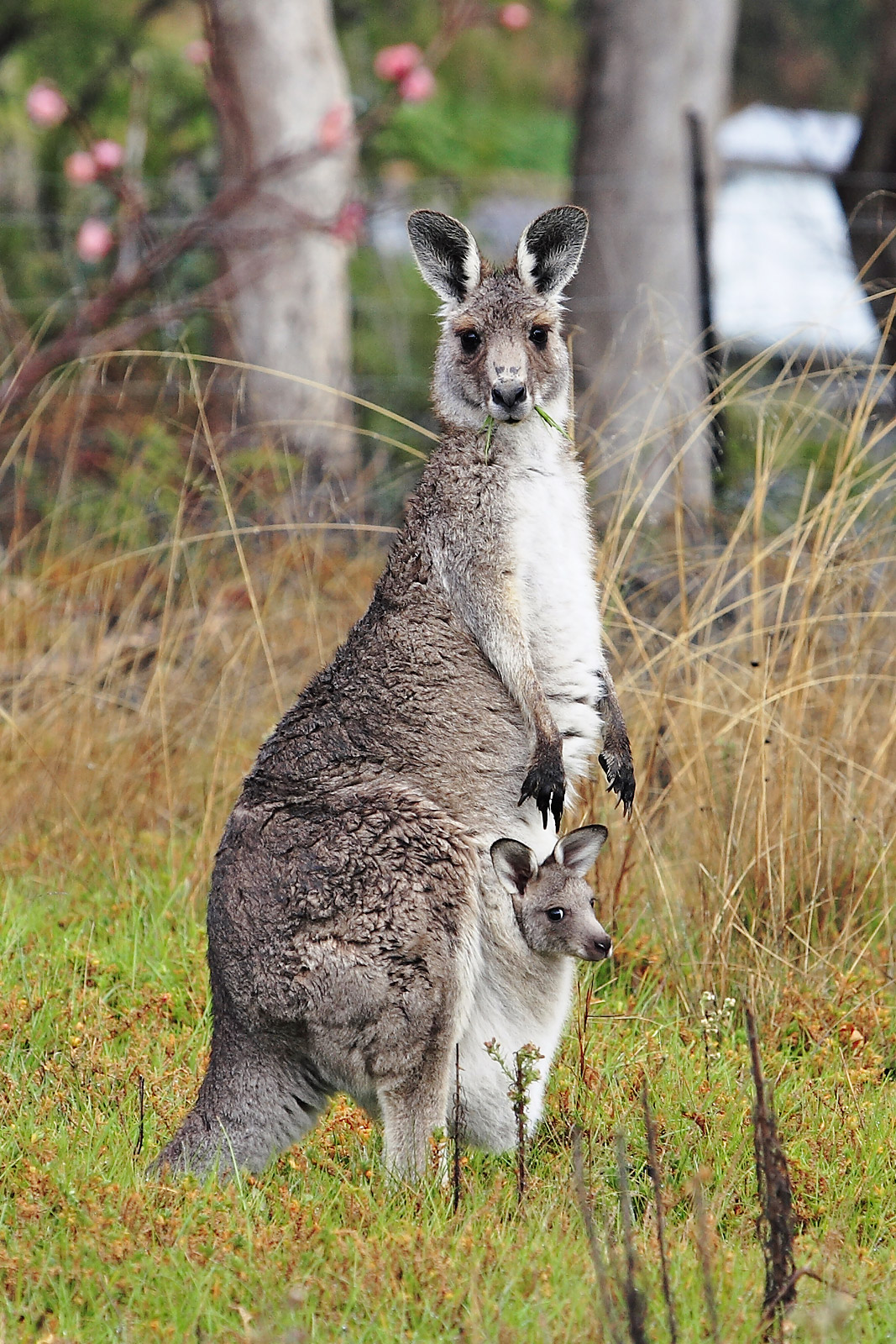
Eastern grey kangaroo with joey

Several Eden Park residents and members of the Australian Society for Kangaroos immediately sought a review of wildlife culling, and questioned whether non-lethal means of controlling kangaroo populations had been effectively tried.

In December 2010, the Victorian Department of Sustainability and Environment defended the decision to issue a permit to cull the kangaroos with a spokesperson saying that a build-up in the population of kangaroos may present a public safety risk around roads and urban areas, and that the cull was a last resort.

The cull met with opposition from residents, Whittlesea Council and members of the Australian Society for Kangaroos with protests and 24-hour vigils outside the Eden Park property.

In February 2011, Whittlesea Council voted unanimously to ask the Department of Sustainability and Environment to suspend the cull. Eden Park is classified as a rural property, which means that Council cannot control firearms use on the property through classification of the area as a populous place. Four of five local members of parliament called on the State Government to stop the cull.

In March 2011, protesters launched a round the clock vigil of the Eden Park property and threatened to physically intervene to stop the cull.

Criticism of the Ecoplan report and the kangaroo cull were made by Professor Steve Garlick from The Sustainability Research Centre at the University of the Sunshine Coast, who stated on 13 September 2011:

As a specialist in kangaroo behaviour, environmental sustainability and higher education I reviewed Mr Walters' report last December for the Australian Society for Kangaroos. My assessment was that the Ecoplan report provides no causal or supportive evidence to justify the significant conclusion it makes about the lives of kangaroos at Northern Lodge. It makes recommendations that are at variance with its own observations and remarks, is inconsistent with the learning values being advocated by the NMIT, and undertakes no benefit-cost assessment of other options. The report lacks analytical and ethical credibility and as a document that seeks to destroy the lives of sentient beings and their dependent young should be discounted as wholly inadequate and lacking moral foundation.

The Australian Society for Kangaroos commissioned consulting ecologist Raymond Mjadwesch from Bathurst to review the Ecoplan report. Mr Mjadwesch said the plan had been prepared to justify the shooting of kangaroos and "demonstrates no scientific method, no data, no considered analysis, and no evidence ... the reviewer can have no confidence in the results or conclusions", The Environment Minister and Department of Sustainability and Environment have not commented on the review of the Ecoplan report.

== Allegations of animal cruelty ==
RSPCA Australia Victoria president Hugh Wirth said the organisation would investigate all reports of animal cruelty resulting from the Eden Park kangaroo cull and also said herding of kangaroos, which had been reported as part of the kangaroo cull, was in breach of a Victorian kangaroo management plan compiled by the DSE and approved by the RSPCA years ago.

After kangaroo shootings in March 2011, the Australian Society for Kangaroos alleged four kangaroo bodies were found shot in the abdomen and left to die in agony. Under the cull permit, wounded animals must be tracked down immediately and killed with a single shot to the head.

RSPCA inspectorate manager Greg Boland investigated the deaths of two of the kangaroos and said that from a veterinarian's report on one, "the RSPCA reasonably concludes that it is likely this particular kangaroo was not killed instantly and may have suffered during death." Boland called for witnesses to come forward to assist an investigation of an offence under the Prevention of Cruelty to Animals Act.

== Ministerial response ==
The Victorian Government and Victorian Environment Minister Ryan Smith refused to intervene to suspend or investigate the Eden Park kangaroo cull. He said in February 2011 the permits were not subject to challenge.

There were no public statements on the Eden Park Kangaroo Cull by NMIT. NMIT's Faculty of Earth Science associate director Wayne Pappin said in November 2010, "I don't make comments on these matters because DSE are the ones who issue the permit. But I can 110 per cent guarantee we comply with the conditions (of the permit)."
