= Right! Right! Right! =

Video by Jet
- Released: October 2004
- Label: Capitol Music

Jet chronology
Right! Right! Right! (2004)	Family Style (2004)

Right! Right! Right! is a concert film by Melbourne-based rock band Jet, recorded from their performance at the Forum Theatre, Melbourne. The performance was on the tour following the release of their debut album, Get Born. The DVD also contains music videos of selected songs. In addition to this, it contains the documentary Take It Or Leave It, named after one of the band's songs, which records their early success and feelings on events that interrupted the progress and recording of Get Born.

== Features ==
Live at the Forum

1. "Get What You Need" (Nic Cester, Chris Cester, Cameron Muncey)
2. "Last Chance" (Chris Cester, Cameron Muncey)
3. "Rollover DJ" (Nic Cester, Chris Cester)
4. "Sweet Young Thing" (Edward C. Cobb)
5. "Lazy Gun" (Nic Cester, Chris Cester)
6. "Radio Song" (Nic Cester, Chris Cester, Cameron Muncey)
7. "Look What You've Done" (Nic Cester)
8. "Hey Kids" (Nic Cester, Chris Cester, Cameron Muncey)
9. "Are You Gonna Be My Girl" (Nic Cester, Cameron Muncey)
10. "Cold Hard Bitch" (Nic Cester, Chris Cester, Cameron Muncey)
11. "Get Me Outta Here" (Nic Cester, Chris Cester)
12. "Take It Or Leave It" (Nic Cester, Cameron Muncey)
13. "Move On" (Nic Cester, Chris Cester)
14. "That's Alright Mama" (Arthur 'Big Boy' Crudup)

Music Videos

1. "Take It Or Leave It"
2. "Rollover DJ"
3. "Rollover DJ (US Version)"
4. "Look What You've Done (UK Version)"
5. "Are You Gonna Be My Girl"
6. "Cold Hard Bitch"

== Charts ==
Chart (2004/05)	Peak position
Australian DVD (ARIA Charts)	1

== Certifications ==
Region	Certification	Certified units/sales
Australia (ARIA)	2× Platinum	30,000^{^}
^{^} Shipments figures based on certification alone.
