= APRA Music Awards of 2005 =

Annual Australian music awards

- Date: 30 May 2005
- Location: Four Seasons Hotel; Sydney, Australia

The Australasian Performing Right Association Awards of 2005 (generally known as APRA Awards) are a series of awards which include the APRA Music Awards, Classical Music Awards, and Screen Music Awards. The APRA Music Awards ceremony occurred on 30 May at the Sydney Four Seasons Hotel, they were presented by APRA and the Australasian Mechanical Copyright Owners Society (AMCOS). The Classical Music Awards were distributed in July in Sydney and are sponsored by APRA and the Australian Music Centre (AMC). The Screen Music Awards were issued in November by APRA and Australian Guild of Screen Composers (AGSC).

== Awards ==
Nominees and winners with results indicated on the right.

=== APRA Music Awards ===
Song of the Year
Title	Artist	Writer	Result
"From the Sea"	Eskimo Joe	Finlay Beaton, Stuart MacLeod, Joel Quartermain	Nominated
"Look What You've Done"	Jet	Nicholas Cester	Nominated
"Scar"	Missy Higgins	Missy Higgins, Kevin Griffin	Won
"Ten Days"	Missy Higgins	Missy Higgins, Jay Clifford	Nominated
"Young Man Old Man (You Ain't Better Than the Rest)"	The Dissociatives	Daniel Johns, Paulmac	Nominated
Songwriters of the Year
Writer			Result
Jet – Nicholas Cester, Cameron Muncey, Chris Cester			Won
APRA Breakthrough Award
Writer			Result
Missy Higgins			Won
Ted Albert Award for Outstanding Services to Australian Music
Name			Result
Michael Chugg			Won
Most Performed Australian Work
Title	Artist	Writer	Result
"All I Need Is You"	Guy Sebastian	Guy Sebastian, Adam Reily, Alun Firth	Nominated
"Look What You've Done"	Jet	Nicholas Cester	Nominated
"Predictable"	Delta Goodrem	Delta Goodrem, Kara DioGuardi, Jarrad Rogers	Nominated
"So Beautiful"	Pete Murray	Peter Murray	Won
"What About Me (Moving Pictures song)"	Shannon Noll	Garry Frost, Frances Swan	Nominated
Most Performed Australian Work Overseas
Title	Artist	Writer	Result
"Are You Gonna Be My Girl"	Jet	Nicholas Cester, Cameron Muncey	Won
"Cold Hard Bitch"	Jet	Nicholas Cester, Christopher Cester, Cameron Muncey	Nominated
"Down Under"	Men at Work	Colin Hay, Ronald Strykert	Nominated
"Love Is in the Air"	John Paul Young	Harry Vanda, George Young	Nominated
"Truly Madly Deeply"	Savage Garden	Darren Hayes, Daniel Jones	Nominated
Most Performed Country Work
Title	Artist	Writer	Result
"Answer to Billy"	Slim Dusty	John Dohling	Nominated
"Factory Man"	Troy Cassar-Daley	Shane Howard	Nominated
"Hollywood"	Kasey Chambers	Kasey Chambers	Nominated
"Like a River"	Kasey Chambers	Kasey Chambers	Won
"Real People"	Melinda Schneider	Melinda Schneider, Michael Carr	Nominated
Most Performed Dance Work
Title	Artist	Writer	Result
"City Rules"	Daniel Merriweather	Daniel Merriweather	Won
"Girls Can Be Cruel"	Infusion	Manuel Sharrad, Jamie Stevens, Francis Xavier	Nominated
"I Am Tha 1"	Mr Timothy featuring Inaya Day	Tim Dudfield, Inaya Day, Bradford Pinto, Gary Pinto	Nominated
"I've Got Your Number"	Cheyne	Cheyne Coates	Nominated
"The Nosebleed Section"	Hilltop Hoods	Barry Francis, Matthew Lambert, Daniel Smith	Nominated
Most Performed Foreign Work
Title	Artist	Writer	Result
"Here Without You"	3 Doors Down	Bradley Arnold, Robert Harrell, Christopher Henderson, Matthew Roberts	Won
"Left Outside Alone"	Anastacia	Anastacia, Dallas Austin, Glen Ballard	Nominated
"The Reason"	Hoobastank	Daniel Estrin, Douglas Robb, Chris Hesse, Markku Lappalainen	Nominated
"She Will Be Loved"	Maroon 5	Adam Levine, James Valentine, Jesse Carmichael, Michael Dusick, Michael Madden	Nominated
"This Love"	Maroon 5	Adam Levine, James Valentine, Jesse Carmichael, Michael Dusick, Michael Madden	Nominated
Most Performed Jazz Work
Title	Artist	Writer	Result
"Christmas Island"	Christopher Abrahams	Christopher Abrahams	Nominated
"Drive By"	The Necks	Christopher Abrahams, Anthony Buck, Lloyd Swanton	Won
"Mighty Fly"	Fogg	Jeff Raglus, Bruce Haymes	Nominated
"Rocket to the Moon"	Fogg	Jeff Raglus, Bruce Haymes	Nominated
"Trip Me Up"	Fogg	Jeff Raglus, Bruce Haymes	Nominated
=== Classical Music Awards ===
Best Composition by an Australian Composer
Title		Composer	Result
Let the Storm Break Loose!		Colin Bright	Nominated
Moments of Bliss		Brett Dean	Won
Song of Songs		Andrew Schultz	Nominated
String Quartet No. 4		Carl Vine	Nominated
Best Performance of an Australian Composition
Title	Composer	Performer	Result
Eclipse	Brett Dean	Artemis Quartet	Nominated
Moments of Bliss	Brett Dean	Melbourne Symphony Orchestra	Nominated
Piano Concerto	Nigel Westlake	Michael Kieran Harvey	Nominated
Concerto for Cello and Orchestra	Carl Vine	Steven Isserlis, Sydney Symphony	Won
String Quartet No. 4	Carl Vine	Takács Quartet	Nominated
Instrumental Work of the Year
Title	Composer	Performer	Result
Concertino da Camera	Peggy Glanville-Hicks	Tall Poppies Ensemble	Nominated
On Shooting Stars	Vincent Plush	Tall Poppies Ensemble	Nominated
Rash	Carl Vine	Michael Kieran Harvey	Nominated
Six Fish	Nigel Westlake	Saffire Guitar Quartet	Won
Long-Term Contribution to the Advancement of Australian Music
Artist or Organisation			Result
Musica Viva Australia			Won
Roger Covell			Nominated
Sydney Chamber Choir			Nominated
Tim Kain			Nominated
Orchestral Work of the Year
Title	Composer	Performer	Result
Concerto for Guitar and Strings	Ross Edwards	Karin Schaupp, Tasmanian Symphony Orchestra, Richard Mills (conductor)	Won
Crystal Spheres	Nigel Westlake	Solarmax film orchestra	Nominated
Inflight Entertainment	Graeme Koehne	Diana Doherty, Sydney Symphony, Takuo Yuasa (conductor)	Nominated
Love Me Sweet	Carl Vine	Diana Doherty, Sinfonia Australis, Mark Summerbell (conductor)	Nominated
Outstanding Contribution by an Individual
Individual		Work	Result
Lyn Carr		2004 Keys Competition	Nominated
Roland Peelman			Nominated
Vincent Plush		Voices program – Brisbane Writers Festival	Won
Outstanding Contribution by an Organisation
Organisation		Work	Result
Brisbane Writers Festival		Brisbane Writers Festival 2004	Nominated
MLC School, Burwood		Music Department	Nominated
Tasmanian Symphony Orchestra		Australian Music Program 2004	Won
Outstanding Contribution to Australian Music in Education
Organisation		Work	Result
Musica Viva in Schools			Nominated
Sydney Symphony		2004 Education Program	Nominated
Tony Gould			Nominated
West Australian Symphony Orchestra, Education Chamber Orchestra (WASO EChO)		The Dischord Hunter	Won
Outstanding Contribution to Australian Music in a Regional Area
Organisation		Work	Result
Border Music Camp		2004 activities	Won
Hunter Singers		2004 activities	Nominated
Northern Rivers Performing Arts (NORPA)		2004 activities	Nominated
Vocal or Choral Work of the Year
Title	Composer	Performer	Result
De Profundis	Nicholas Routley	Sydney Chamber Choir	Nominated
"Lost in the Heavenly Light"	Tony Backhouse	Café of the Gate of Salvation	Nominated
Omaggio alla Pieta	Mary Finsterer	The Song Company	Nominated
Tales of the Supernatural	Andrew Ford	Australian String Quartet, Jane Edwards	Won
=== Screen Music Awards ===
Feature Film Score of the Year
Title		Composer	Result
Somersault		Kenny Davis Jnr, Ben Ely, Matthew Fitzgerald, Peter Kelly, Lenka Kripac, Tom Schutzinger	Won
The Crop		Chris Neal, Braedy Neal	Nominated
The Extra		Roger Mason	Nominated
Three Dollars		Alan John	Nominated
Best Music for an Advertisement
Title		Composer	Result
A.R.U. – "Butterflies"		Christopher Elves	Won
Audi A6		Rafael May	Nominated
Canon (company) – Digic		Hylton Mowday	Nominated
Visa – "Monkeys"		Bruce Heald	Nominated
Best Music for Children's Television
Title		Composer	Result
Foreign Exchange – "Episode 1"		Chris Neal, Braedy Neal	Won
Parallax		Keith Van Geyzel, Tim Count	Nominated
The Eggs – "Episode 19"		Anthony Byrne, Brendan Byrne, Scott Kingman	Nominated
Tracey McBean - "Galaxy Blazers"		Nerida Tyson-Chew	Nominated
Best Music for a Documentary
Title		Composer	Result
Butterfly Man		Jessica Wells	Nominated
Girl in a Mirror		Greg J Walker	Nominated
Sex, Drugs & String Quartets		Carla Thackrah	Won
Switch in the Night		Biddy Conner	Nominated
Best Music for a Mini-Series or Telemovie
Title		Composer	Result
Hell Has Harbour Views		Nigel Westlake	Won
The Alice		David Bridie	Nominated
The Brush-Off		Cezary Skubiszewski	Nominated
Through My Eyes		Mark Seymor, Cameron McKenzie	Nominated
Best Music for a Short Film
Title		Composer	Result
Incarnation		Jessica Wells	Nominated
The Mysterious Geographic Explorations of Jasper Morello		Bruce Rowland	Won
The Saviour		Jessica Wells	Nominated
The Writer		Ricky Edwards	Nominated
Best Music for a Television Series or Serial
Series or Serial	Episode title	Composer	Result
All Saints	Episode 317: "Divide and Conquer"	Matteo Zingales	Nominated
Love My Way		Stephen Rae	Won
Outback House	"Episode 1"	Art Phillips	Nominated
The Art of War		Paul Grabowsky	Nominated
Best Original Song Composed for a Feature Film, Telemovie, TV Series or Mini-Series
Song title	Work	Composer	Result
"Making Music"	Hi-5	Chris Harriott, Leone Carey	Nominated
"Pitjantjara"	The Alice	David Bridie, Frank Yamma	Won
"Yeah, Yeah, we're the Eggs"	The Eggs	Tony Byrne, Brendan Byrne	Nominated
Best Soundtrack Album
Title		Composer	Result
Anacondas: The Hunt for the Blood Orchid		Nerida Tyson-Chew	Nominated
The Extra		Roger Mason	Won
The Illustrated Family Doctor		Thomas Ellard	Nominated
Undead - The Original Motion Picture Soundtrack		Cliff Bradley	Nominated
Best Television Theme
Title		Composer	Result
Catalyst		David Chapman	Nominated
Colour of War: The Anzacs		Neil Sutherland	Won
Missing		Elliot Wheeler	Nominated
The Memphis Trousers Half Hour		Paul Healy	Nominated
International Achievement Award
Artist			Result
Bruce Rowland			Won
Most Performed Screen Composer - Australia
Composer			Result
Brenton White			Nominated
Chris Harriott			Nominated
Neil Sutherland			Won
Tim Count, Keith Van Geyzel			Nominated
Most Performed Screen Composer - Overseas
Composer			Result
Chris Pettifer			Nominated
Garry McDonald, Laurie Stone			Won
Les Gock			Nominated
Mark Rivett			Nominated

== See also ==
- Music of Australia
