= Dirty Sweet =

EP by Jet
- Released: November 2002
- Recorded: July–August 2002 Birdland Studio, Hothouse Studio, Melbourne
- Genre: Hard rock; garage rock
- Length: 15:15
- Label: Rubber
- Producer: Lindsay Gravina; Craig Harnath

Jet chronology
Dirty Sweet (2002)	Get Born (2003)

Dirty Sweet is the debut four-track extended play by Australian rock band Jet, released in November 2002 on Rubber Records. It was re-recorded and re-issued on 6 May 2003 by Elektra Records. All tracks on the EP are also on the band's debut album, Get Born, which followed on 14 September. Two tracks, originally on the EP, were later issued as singles from Get Born, "Rollover DJ" (November) and "Cold Hard Bitch" (March 2004).

== Background ==
Dirty Sweet is the debut extended play by Australian rock band Jet, which first appeared in November 2002 on Rubber Records. The line-up of Jet were Chris Cester on drums, percussion, guitar and backing vocals; his brother, Nic Cester on vocals, rhythm guitar, piano and tambourine; Cameron Muncey on lead guitar and backing vocals; and Mark Wilson on bass guitar, keyboards, harmonica, and backing vocals. Two tracks, "Take It or Leave It" and "Cold Hard Bitch" were recorded in July 2002 with Lindsay Gravina, and two more tracks, "Move On" and "Rollover DJ", in the following month with Craig Harnath.

In January 2003, the EP was re-recorded prior to Jet supporting the Rolling Stones at gigs in Sydney and Melbourne in February, on the Australian leg of their Licks Tour. Dirty Sweet was re-released on 6 May 2003 by Elektra Records.

== Reception ==
Professional ratings
Review scores
Source	Rating
AllMusic	3/5 stars
Drowned in Sound	7/10 stars
Rolling Stone	(not rated) link
Stylus Magazine	(F)

AllMusic's MacKenzie Wilson reviewed Dirty Sweet and noted influences from AC/DC and Mick Jagger for the "impressive debut", where the group "keeps it real with raw energy; there's nothing kitschy about it". However, Stylus Magazine's Sam Bloch described their "watered-down blues-wannabe riff monsters ... the sound of a bunch of poseurs having a play at ROCK because they saw it on TV once". Drowned in Sound's Ross Bennett found that they "might not jump out and grab you; it might not make you sweat, but if you own a Stones record, and an AC/DC album, then it will do you no harm to slot this EP in between the two. There is enough musicianship, melody and spirit on this record to make you want to hear more".

== Track listing ==
All tracks are written by Nic Cester, Cameron Muncey, Chris Cester, except as noted

No.	Title	Length
1.	"Take It or Leave It"	2:49
2.	"Cold Hard Bitch"	4:30
3.	"Move On" (N Cester, C Cester)	4:29
4.	"Rollover DJ" (N Cester, C Cester)	3:26
Total length:		15:15

== Personnel ==
Jet members

- Chris Cester – drums, percussion, backing vocals, tambourine
- Nic Cester – vocals, rhythm guitar
- Cameron Muncey – lead guitar, backing vocals
- Mark Wilson – bass guitar, harmonica

Additional musicians

- Andre Warhurst – slide guitar (track 3)

Production work

- Engineer – Lindsay Gravina (tracks 1, 2), Craig Harnath (tracks 3, 4)
- Producer – Lindsay Gravina (tracks 1, 2), Craig Harnath (tracks 3, 4)
- Studio – Birdland (tracks 1, 2), Hothouse (tracks 3, 4)

Art work

- Photography – Brad Jones, Melanie Fergin
- Cover art – Jet, Traffic Design Studios

== Charts ==
Chart (2003)	Peak position
UK Albums (OCC)	131
