= Get Me Outta Here =

2004 single by Jet

Single by Jet

from the album Get Born
- Released: 27 December 2004
- Length: 2:56
- Label: Elektra
- Songwriter(s): Nic Cester; Cameron Muncey
- Producer(s): Dave Sardy

Jet singles chronology
"Cold Hard Bitch" (2004)	"Get Me Outta Here" (2004)	"Put Your Money Where Your Mouth Is" (2006)

"Get Me Outta Here" is the fifth single from Australian rock band Jet's 2003 debut album, Get Born. The song was released as a 7-inch single in the United Kingdom on 27 December 2004, reaching number 37 on the UK Singles Chart.

== Charts ==
Chart (2005)	Peak position
Scotland (OCC)	44
UK Singles (OCC)	37
