= Get Born =

Studio album by Jet
- Released: 14 September 2003
- Recorded: 2003
- Studios: Sunset Sound; Larrabee East (Los Angeles)
- Genres: Garage rock; hard rock; alternative rock
- Length: 48:40
- Labels: Capitol; Elektra
- Producer: Dave Sardy

Jet chronology
Dirty Sweet EP (2002)	Get Born (2003)	Rare Tracks (2004)

Singles from Get Born
- 1. "Are You Gonna Be My Girl" Released: 18 August 2003; 2. "Rollover DJ" Released: 3 November 2003; 3. "Look What You've Done" Released: 8 March 2004; 4. "Cold Hard Bitch" Released: 26 July 2004 (Note: Released in the US on 9 February 2004.); 5. "Get Me Outta Here" Released: 27 December 2004

Get Born is the debut studio album by Australian rock band Jet. It was released on 14 September 2003 and has sold over 4 million copies worldwide. The album includes Jet's most popular song, "Are You Gonna Be My Girl".

== Writing and recording ==
Jet went to Sunset Sound Studios and Larrabee East in Los Angeles to record Get Born. The band left the recording studios halfway through recording the album to fly back to support the Rolling Stones on their Australian leg of the Licks tour.

"Are You Gonna Be My Girl", from this album, was voted number one in the 2003 Triple J Hottest 100. Get Born also has a song, "Timothy", dedicated to guitarist Cameron Muncey's brother, who died when he was a baby (the song has also been remixed for American rapper Timbaland's 2009 album Shock Value II). The track "Radio Song" was written about when they were an unsigned band in Melbourne seeking attention, and "Rollover DJ" was written about the difficulty they encountered when trying to play gigs because of the takeover of dance music.

== Critical reception ==
Professional ratings
Aggregate scores
Source	Rating
Metacritic	70/100
Review scores
Source	Rating
AllMusic	4/5 stars
Alternative Press	5/5 stars
Blender	3.5/5 stars
Robert Christgau	(2-star Honorable Mention)
Entertainment Weekly	B+
Pitchfork	3.7/10
Q	4/5 stars
Rolling Stone	3/5 stars
Spin	B−
Uncut	2/5 stars

Get Born received generally positive reviews from music critics. At Metacritic, which assigns a normalised rating out of 100 to reviews from mainstream critics, the album received an average score of 70, based on 15 reviews. Alternative Press gave it a rave review and found Jet's songs "catchy" and their appeal "diverse". Q magazine said that the album's raw immediacy "belies its dated influences." Uncut called it "an efficient if fairly joyless hybrid of the Stones, AC/DC and Oasis." In a negative review, Pitchfork wrote that Jet sounds like "everyone's favorite old rock bands" and have "insipid lyrics", including interjections such as "come on!" and "oh yeah!" sung "every five seconds". Robert Christgau of The Village Voice cited "Rollover D.J." and "Look What You've Done" as highlights and remarked that the band has "the juice and talent to make their retro happen without the brains or vision to run with it". He gave the album a two-star honorable mention, indicating a "likable effort consumers attuned to its overriding aesthetic or individual vision may well enjoy." In October 2010, Get Born was listed in the book 100 Best Australian Albums.

=== Lead single ===
The album's lead single, "Are You Gonna Be My Girl", was often singled out due to distinct similarities to Iggy Pop's "Lust for Life". The band argued that "Are You Gonna Be My Girl" had more in common with '60s Motown, however; namely, songs such as "I'm Ready for Love" by Martha and the Vandellas and "You Can't Hurry Love" by the Supremes. In an AllMusic review of "Are You Gonna Be My Girl", the song was praised for its commercial appeal despite its resemblance to "Lust for Life", saying "Whether 'Are You Gonna Be My Girl?' (sic) is creatively bankrupt, or just an extreme example of how all music is influenced by what came before it, is up for debate. ... Either way, the song is impossible to ignore."

Chris Cester addressed the media speculation in an interview with Pop in Uptown Magazine, stating: "It's funny because I asked him point blank about that. He said I was crazy. He said that when he and David Bowie were writing 'Lust for Life', they were ripping off Motown's beat. It's funny that he said that to me because we also thought we were ripping off Motown more than 'Lust for Life'. To be honest with you that kind of annoyed me a lot, because I always thought it was really lazy. People just go, well 'Lust for Life' is more well-known so that's what they go for, but if you listen to a song like 'You Can't Hurry Love' (The Supremes) I think you'll find it's closer to 'Are You Gonna Be My Girl' than 'Lust for Life' ever was. And that's what Iggy said as well."

== Commercial performance ==
Get Born debuted at number three and peaked at number one on the Australian ARIA Albums Chart as of May 2004 (so far being certified 8× Platinum), number 17 on the UK Albums Chart (number 14 after a re-entry in June 2004), and peaked at number 26 on the U.S. Billboard 200 albums chart (and was certified Platinum).

"Are You Gonna Be My Girl?" also peaked at number 20 and certified Gold on the Australian ARIA Singles Chart, number 23 on the UK Singles Chart in September 2003 (number 16 after a re-release in May 2004), and number 29 on the U.S. Billboard Hot 100 singles chart.

The second single, "Rollover DJ", was released in Australia and the UK, and peaked at number 31 and number 34 respectively.

The third single released in Australia and the UK was "Look What You've Done", which peaked at number 14 and number 28 respectively. It was also released as the third single in the U.S. in January 2005, and reached number 37 as of March 2005.

In the US, "Cold Hard Bitch" was released as the second single, reaching number one on the Billboard Modern Rock and Mainstream Rock charts and number 55 on the Billboard Hot 100. In Australia, it was released as the fourth single in July 2004, and reached number 33 in August 2004, and in the UK, it reached number 34 in September 2004.

A fifth single also charted in the UK, this being "Get Me Outta Here", reaching number 37 in December 2004.

In the week ending 11 September 2006, Get Born re-entered at a position of number 46 on the ARIA Charts, presumably because Jet had "Put Your Money Where Your Mouth Is", the lead single from their second album, Shine On.

== Track listing ==
No.	Title	Writer(s)	Length
1.	"Last Chance"	Chris Cester; Cameron Muncey	1:52
2.	"Are You Gonna Be My Girl"	Nic Cester; C. Muncey	3:34
3.	"Rollover DJ"	N. Cester; C. Cester	3:17
4.	"Look What You've Done"	N. Cester	3:50
5.	"Get What You Need"	N. Cester; C. Cester; C. Muncey	4:08
6.	"Move On"	N. Cester; C. Cester	4:21
7.	"Radio Song"	N. Cester; C. Cester; C. Muncey	4:32
8.	"Get Me Outta Here"	N. Cester; C. Cester	2:56
9.	"Cold Hard Bitch"	N. Cester; C. Cester; C. Muncey	4:03
10.	"Come Around Again"	N. Cester; C. Muncey	4:30
11.	"Take It or Leave It"	N. Cester; C. Muncey	2:23
12.	"Lazy Gun"	N. Cester; C. Cester	4:42
13.	"Timothy"	C. Cester	4:32
Total length:			48:40

Limited edition bonus track *Bonus track does not feature on Disc 1 of the Deluxe Edition.
No.	Title	Writer(s)	Length
14.	"Sgt. Major"	N. Cester; C. Cester	4:04

Deluxe edition bonus disc
No.	Title	Length
1.	"Sgt. Major"	4:04
2.	"That's Alright Mama" (Live)	5:31
3.	"Hey Kids"	3:00
4.	"You Were Right" (Demo)	3:42
5.	"You Don't Look The Same" (Demo)	4:40
6.	"Bruises"	2:37
7.	"Move On" (Live at the Troubadour)	4:05
8.	"Are You Gonna Be My Girl" (Live – AOL Session)	3:49
9.	"Take It or Leave It" (Live in Hamburg)	2:54
10.	"Lazy Gun" (Demo)	3:23
11.	"Cigarettes and Cola" (Demo)	2:05

== Personnel ==
Jet

- Nic Cester – lead vocals, guitars
- Chris Cester – drums, percussion, tambourine, backing vocals, lead vocals ("Get What You Need", "Move On" and "Timothy")
- Cameron Muncey – guitars, backing vocals, lead vocals ("Radio Song" and "Come Around Again")
- Mark Wilson – bass guitar, piano (on "Look What You've Done"), harmonica (on "Move On")

Additional musicians

- Billy Preston – keyboards
- Roger Joseph Manning Jr. – keyboards
- Andre Warhurst – slide guitar (on "Move On")
- Dave Sardy – producer, tambourine, slide guitar (on "Lazy Gun"), additional guitar (on "Are You Gonna Be My Girl?")
- Davey Lane – additional guitar (on "Lazy Gun")

== Charts ==
=== Weekly charts ===
Weekly chart performance for Get Born
Chart (2003–2004)	Peak position
Argentine Albums (CAPIF)	4
Australian Albums (ARIA)	1
Austrian Albums (Ö3 Austria)	51
Canadian Albums (Nielsen SoundScan)	26
Dutch Albums (Album Top 100)	68
Dutch Alternative Albums (Alternative Top 30)	2
French Albums (SNEP)	101
German Albums (Offizielle Top 100)	19
Irish Albums (IRMA)	40
Italian Albums (FIMI)	14
Japanese Albums (Oricon)	43
New Zealand Albums (RMNZ)	17
Scottish Albums (Official Charts)	8
Swiss Albums (Schweizer Hitparade)	85
UK Albums (Official Charts)	14
US Billboard 200	26

=== Monthly charts ===
Monthly chart performance for Get Born
Chart (2004)	Peak position
Argentine Albums (CAPIF)	1

=== Year-end charts ===
2003 year-end chart performance for Get Born
Chart (2003)	Position
Australian Albums (ARIA)	48

2004 year-end chart performance for Get Born
Chart (2004)	Position
Australian Albums (ARIA)	1
New Zealand Albums (RMNZ)	49
UK Albums (OCC)	63
US Billboard 200	50

2005 year-end chart performance for Get Born
Chart (2005)	Position
Australian Albums (ARIA)	35

=== Decade-end charts ===
Decade-end chart performance for Get Born
Chart (2000–2009)	Position
Australian Albums (ARIA)	7

== Certifications ==
Certifications for Get Born
Region	Certification	Certified units/sales
Argentina (CAPIF)	Platinum	40,000^{^}
Australia (ARIA)	8× Platinum	660,000
Canada (Music Canada)	Platinum	100,000^{^}
Japan (RIAJ)	Gold	100,000^{^}
New Zealand (RMNZ)	Gold	7,500^{^}
United Kingdom (BPI)	Platinum	300,000^{^}
United States (RIAA)	Platinum	1,700,000
Summaries
Worldwide	—	4,000,000
^{^} Shipments figures based on certification alone.
