= APRA Music Awards of 2006 =

Annual Australian music awards

- Date: 5 June 2006
- Location: Four Seasons Hotel; Sydney, Australia

The Australasian Performing Right Association Awards of 2006 (generally known as APRA Awards) are a series of awards which include the APRA Music Awards, Classical Music Awards, and Screen Music Awards. The APRA Music Awards ceremony occurred on 5 June at the Sydney Four Seasons Hotel, they were presented by APRA and the Australasian Mechanical Copyright Owners Society (AMCOS). APRA introduced two new award categories, 'Most Performed Blues & Roots Work' and 'Most Performed Urban Work'. The Classical Music Awards were distributed in July in Sydney and are sponsored by APRA and the Australian Music Centre (AMC). The Screen Music Awards were issued in November by APRA and Australian Guild of Screen Composers (AGSC).

== Awards ==
Nominees and winners with results indicated on the right.

=== APRA Music Awards ===
Song of the Year
Title	Artist	Writer	Result
"Better Days"	Pete Murray	Pete Murray	Nominated
"O Yeah"	End of Fashion	Justin Burford	Nominated
"Catch My Disease"	Ben Lee	Ben Lee, McGowan Southworth	Won
"The Special Two"	Missy Higgins	Missy Higgins	Nominated
"Mind's Eye"	Wolfmother	Myles Heskett, Chris Ross, Andrew Stockdale	Nominated
Songwriters of the Year
Writer			Result
Bernard Fanning			Won
Breakthrough Songwriter Award
Writer			Result
Wolfmother: Andrew Stockdale, Myles Heskett, Chris Ross			Won
Ted Albert Award for Outstanding Services to Australian Music
Name			Result
Bill Armstrong			Won
Most Performed Australian Work
Title	Artist	Writer	Result
"Catch My Disease"	Ben Lee	Ben Lee, McGowan Southworth	Won
"Someday, Someday"	Thirsty Merc	Rai Thistlethwayte	Nominated
"The Special Two"	Missy Higgins	Missy Higgins	Nominated
"Ten Days"	Missy Higgins	Missy Higgins, Jay Clifford	Nominated
Most Performed Australian Work Overseas
Title	Artist	Writer	Result
"Are You Gonna Be My Girl"	Jet	Nicholas Cester, Cameron Muncey	Won
"Cold Hard Bitch"	Jet	Nicholas Cester, Christopher Cester, Cameron Muncey	Nominated
"Look What You've Done"	Jet	Nicholas Cester	Nominated
"Highway to Hell"	AC/DC	Bon Scott, Angus Young, Malcolm Young	Nominated
"Love Is in the Air"	John Paul Young	Harry Vanda, George Young	Nominated
Most Performed Blues & Roots Work
Title	Artist	Writer	Result
"Ashes"	The Beautiful Girls	Matthew McHugh	Nominated
"Lets Take The Long Way Home"	The Beautiful Girls	Matthew McHugh	Nominated
"Daniel"	Lior	Lior Attar	Nominated
"Somethings Gotta Give"	The John Butler Trio	John Butler	Won
"What You Want"	The John Butler Trio	John Butler	Nominated
Most Performed Country Work
Title	Artist	Writer	Result
"Hollywood"	Kasey Chambers	Kasey Chambers	Nominated
"Pony"	Kasey Chambers	Kasey Chambers	Won
"Saturated"	Kasey Chambers	Kasey Chambers	Nominated
"Rainbow Dreams and Butterflies"	Beccy Cole	Beccy Cole, Rod McCormack	Nominated
"She Still Believes"	Bella	Lyn Bowtell, Jerry Salley	Nominated
Most Performed Dance Work
Title	Artist	Writer	Result
"I Am Tha 1"	Mr Timothy featuring Inaya Day	Tim Dudfield, Inaya Day, Bradford Pinto, Gary Pinto	Nominated
"Natural"	Infusion	Francis Xavier, Manuel Sharrad, Jamie Stevens	Nominated
"Sunshine Eyes"	Paulmac	Paul F. McDermott	Nominated
"Tilt My Hat"	Andy J	Andrew Farriss, Michael Hutchence	Nominated
"Way to Go!"	Rogue Traders	Jamie Appleby, Isaac Moran	Won
Most Performed Foreign Work
Title	Artist	Writer	Result
"Bad Day"	Daniel Powter	Daniel Powter	Nominated
"Beautiful Soul"	Jesse McCartney	Andrew Dodd, Adam Watts	Nominated
"Lonely No More"	Rob Thomas	Rob Thomas	Won
"Shiver"	Natalie Imbruglia	Francis White, Sheppard Solomon, Natalie Imbruglia	Nominated
"Since U Been Gone"	Kelly Clarkson	Martin Sandberg, Lukasz Gottwald	Nominated
Most Performed Jazz Work
Title	Artist	Writer	Result
"Goodbye Greg"	Sidecar	John Hibbard	Nominated
"Grace"	Sam Keevers, Jamie Oehlers	Sam Keevers	Nominated
"Mosquito"	The Necks	Lloyd Swanton, Christopher Abrahams, Anthony Buck	Won
"Shoalhaven Sunrise"	Sydney Allstar Big Band	Graham Jesse	Nominated
"Silverland"	Paul Grabowsky	Paul Grabowsky	Nominated
Most Performed Urban Work
Title	Artist	Writer	Result
"Funk U Up"	Joel Turner and the Modern Day Poets	Joel Turner, Tim Turner, Chris Heiner	Nominated
"These Kids"	Joel Turner and the Modern Day Poets	Joel Turner, Tim Turner, Chris Heiner	Nominated
"Kryptonite"	Guy Sebastian	Guy Sebastian, Beau Dozier	Nominated
"Oh Oh"	Guy Sebastian	Guy Sebastian, Jarred Rogers	Won
"You Make Me Weak"	Jade MacRae	Jade MacRae, Israel Cruz	Nominated
=== Classical Music Awards ===
Best Composition by an Australian Composer
Title		Composer	Result
Mysterium Cosmographicum		Michael Smetanin	Won
Best Performance of an Australian Composition
Title	Composer	Performer	Result
Line Drawing	James Ledger	Genevieve Lacey, West Australian Symphony	Won
Thousands of Bundled Straw	David Young	Libra Ensemble	Nominated
Mysterium Cosmographicum	Michael Smetanin	Lisa Moore, Sydney Symphony	Nominated
String Quartet #16	Peter Sculthorpe	Tokyo String Quartet	Nominated
Instrumental Work of the Year
Title	Composer	Performer	Result
Coomera, A Place of Trees	Dulcie Holland	Southern Cross Soloists	Nominated
Floating World	David Chesworth	David Chesworth Ensemble	Nominated
Panopticon	David Chesworth	David Chesworth Ensemble	Won
Wait a While	David Chesworth	David Chesworth Ensemble	Nominated
Long-Term Contribution to the Advancement of Australian Music
Artist or Organisation			Result
Roger Covell			Won
ELISION Ensemble			Nominated
Lyn Williams			Nominated
Orchestral Work of the Year
Title	Composer	Performer	Result
Blue Rags	Ian Munro	Tasmanian Symphony Orchestra	Nominated
Cello Dreaming Orchestral Version	Peter Sculthorpe	Tasmanian Symphony Orchestra	Won
Oboe Concerto	Ross Edwards	Diana Doherty, Melbourne Symphony Orchestra	Nominated
Quamby	Peter Sculthorpe	Tasmanian Symphony Orchestra	Nominated
Outstanding Contribution by an Individual
Individual		Work	Result
Barbara Blackman		philanthropy to fine music in Australia	Won
Dindy Vaughan		music CD inspired by an environmental theme of water management	Nominated
Outstanding Contribution by an Organisation
Organisation		Work	Result
Queensland Conservatorium Research Centre, Griffith University		Encounters: Meetings in Australian Music program – curated by Vincent Plush	Won
New Music Network		2005 Activities	Nominated
Sydney Children's Choir		2005 Activities	Nominated
Outstanding Contribution to Australian Music in Education
Organisation		Work	Result
Australian String Association (AUSTA)		30th Year in 2005	Nominated
Melbourne Symphony Orchestra		Community Outreach 2005 Program	Nominated
Music Viva in Schools		25th Year in 2005	Won
Outstanding Contribution to Australian Music in a Regional Area
Organisation		Work	Result
Chris Earl		contribution to the brass and wind band community in Australia	Nominated
Sarah Hopkins		composition and performance of Childers Shining: One World	Nominated
Tura New Music		Voices over WA (Kimberley and Pilbara, Western Australia)	Won
Vocal or Choral Work of the Year
Title	Composer	Performer	Result
Journey to the Horseshoe Bend	Andrew Shultz, Gordon Williams	Ntaria Ladies Choir, Sydney Philharmonia Motet Choir, Sydney Symphony	Nominated
Lindy	Moya Henderson	Opera Australia	Nominated
Southern Star (excerpts)	Christopher Willcock, Michael Leunig	Sydney Chamber Choir, Marshall McGuire	Won
=== Screen Music Awards ===
Feature Film Score of the Year
Title		Composer	Result
Half Light		Brett Rosenberg	Nominated
The Caterpillar Wish		Burkhard Dallwitz	Nominated
The Proposition		Nick Cave, Warren Ellis	Nominated
Wolf Creek		Francois Tetaz	Won
Best Music for an Advertisement
Title		Composer	Result
McDonald's – "Inner Child"		Elliott Wheeler	Won
NZ Maritime SF		Rafael May	Nominated
Pepsi – "Samba Legs"		Martin Eden, Carlos Mora	Nominated
YoGo – "Megabot"		Michael Lira	Nominated
Best Music for Children's Television
Title		Composer	Result
Blinky Bill's White Christmas		Guy Gross	Nominated
Faireez – "Episode 40"		Christopher Elves	Won
The Eggs – "Episode 23"		Anthony Byrne, Brendan Byrne	Nominated
Tracey McBean		Nerida Tyson-Chew	Nominated
Best Music for a Documentary
Title		Composer	Result
Cape of Storms		Michael Yezerski, Richard Tognetti, Afro Moses, Chris Nelius	Nominated
Frocks Off		Carla Thackrah	Nominated
Treasure Fleet		Gerard Fitzgerald, Evan Roberts	Nominated
Unfolding Florence: The Many Lives of Florence Broadhurst		Paul Grabowsky	Won
Best Music for a Mini-Series or Telemovie
Title		Composer	Result
The Incredible Journey of Mary Bryant		Iva Davies	Won
The Silence		Antony Partos	Nominated
The Society Murders		Cezary Skubiszewski	Nominated
Thursday's Fictions		Michael Yezerski	Nominated
Best Music for a Short Film
Title		Composer	Result
Gargoyle		Sean Timms	Nominated
Gloomy Valentine		Elliott Wheeler	Nominated
Gustavo		Jonathan Nix	Won
Sub-		Basil Hogios	Nominated
Best Music for a Television Series or Serial
Series or Serial	Episode title	Composer	Result
McLeod's Daughters	"Episode 146"	Alastair Ford	Nominated
MDA	"Episode 7"	Chris Neal	Nominated
Peking to Paris		Roger Mason	Won
Supernova		Paul Healy, Russell Thornton	Nominated
Best Original Song Composed for the Screen
Song title	Work	Composer	Result
"Christmas In Australia"	Blinky Bill's White Christmas	Guy Gross, John Palmer	Nominated
"Nobody But Me"	Elephant Tales	Frank Strangio	Nominated
"ARIA"	Thursday's Fictions	Michael Yezerski	Won
"Indigeridoo"	We Can Be Heroes	Chris Lilley, Bryony Marks	Nominated
Best Soundtrack Album
Title		Composer	Result
R.A.N.		David Bridie, Albert David, Kadu, Key Torres Strait Island Composers	Won
Solo		Damian de Boos-Smith, Martyn Love	Nominated
The Caterpillar Wish		Burkhard Dallwitz	Nominated
Thursday's Fictions		Michael Yezerski	Nominated
Best Television Theme
Title		Composer	Result
The Chaser's War on Everything		Andrew Hansen	Won
The Silence		Antony Partos	Nominated
Torino 2006 Winter Olympics		Burkhard Dallwitz	Nominated
We Can Be Heroes		Chris Lilley, Bryony Marks	Nominated
International Achievement Award
Artist			Result
Peter Best			Won
Most Performed Screen Composer - Australia
Composer			Result
Chris Harriott			Nominated
Stephen Rae			Nominated
Jay Stewart			Won
Neil Sutherland			Nominated
Most Performed Screen Composer - Overseas
Composer			Result
Garry McDonald, Laurie Stone			Won
Mark McDuff			Nominated
Chris Pettifer			Nominated
Neil Sutherland			Nominated

== See also ==
- Music of Australia
