= Rollover DJ =

2003 single by Jet

Single by Jet

from the album Get Born
- B-side: "Sgt. Major"; "Back Door Santa"; "You Don't Look the Same" (demo)
- Released: 3 November 2003
- Studio: Sunset Sound; Larrabee East (Los Angeles)
- Length: 3:16
- Label: Capitol; Elektra
- Songwriters: Nic Cester; Chris Cester; Cameron Muncey
- Producer: Dave Sardy

Jet singles chronology
"Are You Gonna Be My Girl" (2003)	"Rollover DJ" (2003)	"Look What You've Done" (2004)

"Rollover DJ" is the second single (third in the United States) released from Australian rock band Jet's debut album, Get Born (2003). It was released on 3 November 2003 and was promoted with two different music videos. The song reached the top 40 on both the Australian ARIA Singles Chart and the UK Singles Chart.

== Track listings ==
Australian CD single

1. "Rollover DJ"
2. "Are You Gonna Be My Girl" (live)
3. "Take It or Leave It" (live)
4. "Sgt. Major"
5. "Back Door Santa"

Australian 12-inch single

A1. "Rollover DJ"
A2. "You Don't Look the Same" (demo)
B1. "Back Door Santa"
B2. "Sgt. Major"

UK CD1

1. "Rollover DJ"
2. "Sgt. Major"
3. "Are You Gonna Be My Girl" (live)
4. "Rollover DJ" (video)

UK CD2

1. "Rollover DJ"
2. "You Don't Look the Same" (demo)
3. "Cold Hard Bitch" (live)
4. "Rollover DJ" (live video from Pentonville Prison Officers Club)

== Charts ==
=== Weekly charts ===
Weekly chart performance for "Rollover DJ"
Chart (2003–2004)	Peak position
Australia (ARIA)	31
Canada Rock Top 30 (Radio & Records)	4
Scotland Singles (Official Charts)	30
UK Singles (Official Charts)	34
UK Rock & Metal (Official Charts)	5
US Alternative Airplay (Billboard)	14
US Mainstream Rock (Billboard)	14

=== Year-end charts ===
Year-end chart performance for "Rollover DJ"
Chart (2004)	Position
US Modern Rock Tracks (Billboard)	82

== Release history ==
Release dates and formats for "Rollover DJ"
Region	Date	Format(s)	Label(s)	Ref(s).
United Kingdom	3 November 2003	12-inch vinyl; CD	Elektra	
Australia	19 January 2004	12-inch vinyl; CD	Capitol	
United States	28 June 2004	Mainstream rock; active rock; alternative radio	Elektra	
United States	6 July 2004	Triple A radio	Elektra	
