= Family Style (Jet video) =

Video by Jet
- Released: 23 November 2004
- Genre: Rock
- Label: Elektra

Jet chronology
| Right! Right! Right! (2004) | Family Style (2004) |

Family Style is the second and final video album by Jet. The DVD also contains all the band's music videos from Get Born as well as a short behind the scenes documentary showing the band on tour. The album was not released in Australia.

== Track listing ==
1. Cold Hard Bitch
2. Get What You Need
3. Sweet Young Thing
4. Rollover DJ
5. Look What You've Done
6. Lazy Gun
7. Are You Gonna Be My Girl
8. Hey Kids
9. Last Chance
10. Get Me Outta Here
11. Take It Or Leave It
12. Move On
13. That's Alright Mama

Music Videos

1. "Take It Or Leave It"
2. "Rollover DJ (Australia / UK)"
3. "Rollover DJ (International)"
4. "Look What You've Done (UK Version)"
5. "Are You Gonna Be My Girl"
6. "Cold Hard Bitch"
