= The Jaded Hearts Club =

Supergroup

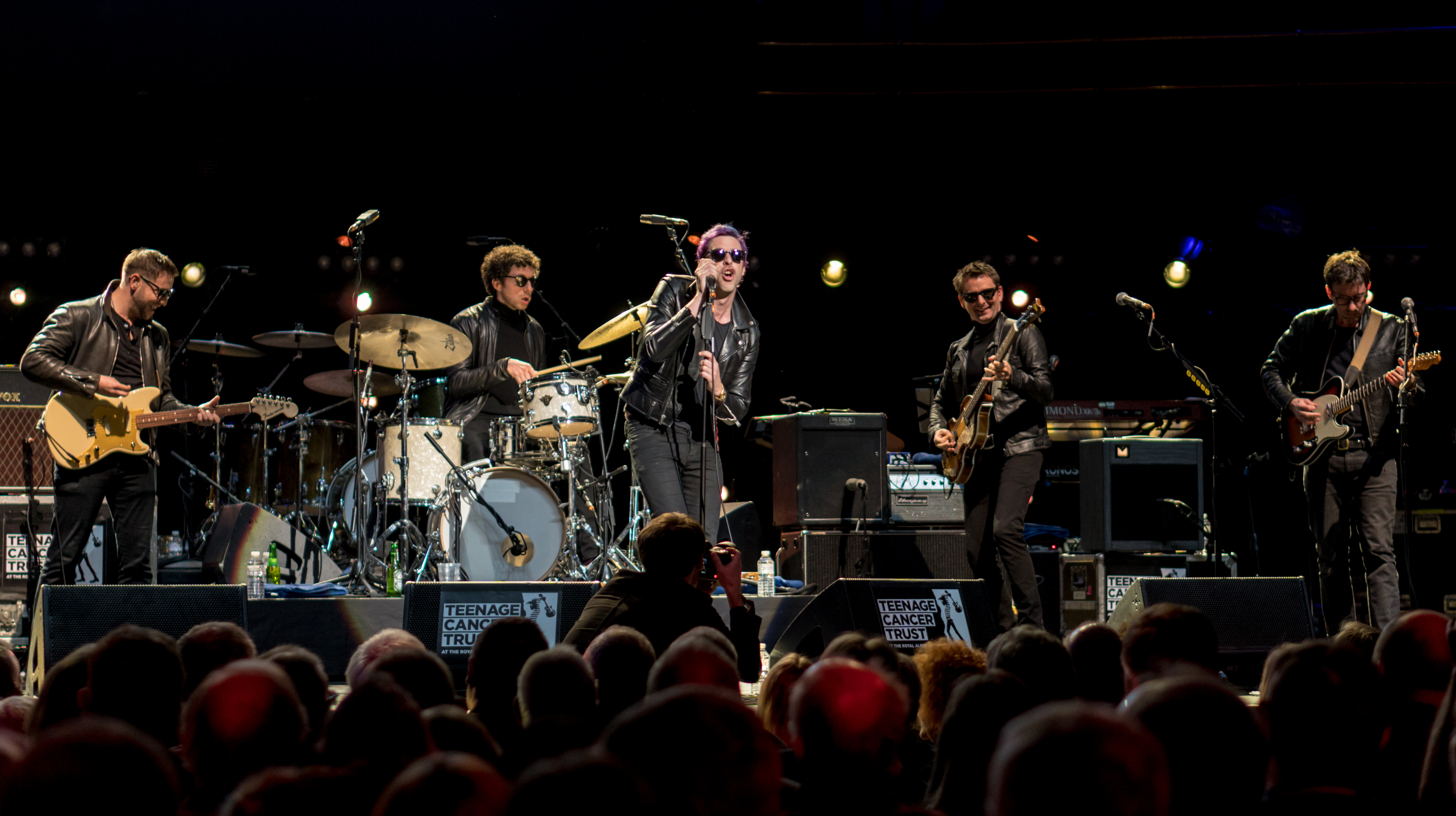
- The Jaded Hearts Club performing in 2018

Background information
- Also known as: Dr. Pepper's Jaded Hearts Club Band
- Origin: Los Angeles, California, United States
- Genres: Rock
- Years active: 2017–present
- Label: Infectious
- Spinoff of: Muse; Jet; Blur
- Members: Matt Bellamy; Miles Kane; Nic Cester; Sean Payne; Jamie Davis
- Past members: Dominic Howard; Chris Wolstenholme; Ilan Rubin; Chris Cester; Graham Coxon

The Jaded Hearts Club is a rock supergroup and covers band consisting of Miles Kane (of the Rascals and Last Shadow Puppets), Nic Cester (of Jet), Matt Bellamy (of Muse), Jamie Davis (of former member Graham Coxon's former label Transcopic) and Sean Payne (of the Zutons).

The band initially performed under the name Dr. Pepper's Jaded Hearts Club Band and performed covers of Beatles songs. Their repertoire expanded to include rock-and-roll songs by bands including Cream, the Who and the Kinks. In 2020, they released an album of covers, You've Always Been Here, to mixed reviews.

== History ==
=== Formation ===
In September 2017, the musician Jamie Davis formed the Jaded Hearts Club to perform covers of Beatles songs at his 40th birthday party. He initially planned to hire a covers band, but decided it would be cheaper to ask his musician friends to perform with him instead. The band initially performed under the name Dr. Pepper's Jaded Hearts Club Band, a reference to the 1967 Beatles album Sgt Pepper's Lonely Hearts Club Band.

Matt Bellamy of Muse said the band began "as a karaoke joke". They decided to continue as they enjoyed themselves and felt other bands were not performing traditional rock and roll. Bellamy said: "Going back to that really great songwriting, some of the best historic songwriting ever, and just playing it almost like a jazz band, real instruments, no gizmos, no tech, nothing like that."

=== Performances ===
In 2018, the Jaded Hearts Club played gigs at the Austin South by Southwest festival, in bars in Chicago and Los Angeles, and at a Teenage Cancer Trust show in the Royal Albert Hall. In addition to Beatles songs, they performed songs by bands including Cream, the Who and the Kinks. The membership changed depending on availability, with appearances by musicians including Dominic Howard and Chris Wolstenholme of Muse, Ilan Rubin and Chris Cester. Paul McCartney joined them to perform at a 2018 event for his daughter Stella McCartney. In 2019, the band performed a charity show at the 100 Club, when the lineup settled.

=== You've Always Been Here (2020) ===
Professional ratings
Aggregate scores
Source	Rating
Metacritic	60
Review scores
Source	Rating
The Independent	4/5 stars
NME	2/5 stars
DIY	1.5/5 stars
Clash	6/10 stars

In October 2020, the Jaded Hearts Club released an album, You've Always Been Here, comprising covers of classic rock-and-roll and Motown songs. It was produced by Bellamy and recorded in his studio shortly before the COVID-19 lockdowns.

On the review aggregate site Metacritic, You've Always Been Here has a rating of 60 out of 100, indicating "mixed or average reviews". In the Independent, Mark Beaumont called it a "carefree celebration". Emma Harrison of Clash praised Bellamy's performance of "We'll Meet Again" and the renditions of "I Put a Spell on You", "Money (That's What I Want)" and "Fever". Ali Shutler of NME saw You've Always Been Here as "well-intentioned but often unlistenable dad-rock", while Lisa Wright of DIY described it as "fucking dire" and a waste of the members' talents.

== Members ==
- Miles Kane – vocals
- Nic Cester – vocals
- Matt Bellamy – bass, vocals
- Sean Payne – drums, backing vocals
- Jamie Davis – rhythm guitar, backing vocals

== Discography ==
=== Albums ===
Studio album

- You've Always Been Here (October 2, 2020)

Live album

- Live at the 100 Club (January 17, 2020)

=== Singles ===
- "Nobody But Me" (March 2, 2020)
- "This Love Starved Heart of Mine (It's Killing Me)" (April 15, 2020)
- "We'll Meet Again / Reach Out I'll Be There" (July 31, 2020)
- "Love's Gone Bad" (September 2, 2020)
- “Do I Love You (Indeed I Do)” (August 6, 2021)
