= APRA Music Awards of 2007 =

Annual Australian music awards

- Date: 5 June 2007
- Location: Melbourne Town Hall; Melbourne, Australia

The Australasian Performing Right Association Awards of 2007 (generally known as APRA Awards) are a series of awards which include the APRA Music Awards, Classical Music Awards, and Screen Music Awards. The APRA Music Awards ceremony occurred on 5 June at the Melbourne Town Hall, they were presented by APRA and the Australasian Mechanical Copyright Owners Society (AMCOS). The Classical Music Awards were distributed in July in Sydney and are sponsored by APRA and the Australian Music Centre (AMC). The Screen Music Awards were issued in November by APRA and Australian Guild of Screen Composers (AGSC).

== Awards ==
Nominees and winners with results indicated on the right.

=== APRA Music Awards ===
Song of the Year
Title	Artist	Writer	Result
"Black Fingernails, Red Wine"	Eskimo Joe	Kav Temperley, Stuart MacLeod, Joel Quartermain	Nominated
"Funky Tonight"	John Butler Trio	John Butler	Nominated
"Heart's a Mess"	Gotye	Walter De Backer	Nominated
"Joker & the Thief"	Wolfmother	Andrew Stockdale, Myles Heskett, Chris Ross	Nominated
"One Crowded Hour"	Augie March	Glenn Richards	Won
Songwriters of the Year
Writer			Result
Andrew Stockdale, Myles Heskett, Chris Ross			Won
Breakthrough Songwriter Award
Writer			Result
Glenn Richards			Won
Ted Albert Award for Outstanding Services to Australian Music
Name			Result
Michael McMartin			Won
Most Performed Australian Work
Title	Artist	Writer	Result
"Flaunt It"	TV Rock featuring Seany B	Sean Berchik, Ivan Gough, Grant Smillie	Nominated
"Lift"	Shannon Noll	Adam Reily, Bryon Jones, Shannon Noll, Andrew Roachford	Won
"Opportunity"	Pete Murray	Pete Murray	Nominated
"Songbird"	Bernard Fanning	Bernard Fanning	Nominated
"Wish You Well"	Bernard Fanning	Bernard Fanning	Nominated
Most Performed Australian Work Overseas
Title	Artist	Writer	Result
"Are You Gonna Be My Girl"	Jet	Nicholas Cester, Cameron Muncey	Won
"Look What You've Done"	Jet	Nicholas Cester	Nominated
"Down Under"	Men at Work	Colin Hay, Ronald Strykert	Nominated
"Highway to Hell"	AC/DC	Bon Scott, Angus Young, Malcolm Young	Nominated
"Love Is in the Air"	John Paul Young	Harry Vanda, George Young	Nominated
Most Performed Blues & Roots Work
Title	Artist	Writer	Result
"Funky Tonight"	The John Butler Trio	John Butler	Nominated
"Middle of the Hill"	Josh Pyke	Josh Pyke	Nominated
"Songbird"	Bernard Fanning	Bernard Fanning	Won
"Watch Over Me"	Bernard Fanning	Bernard Fanning	Nominated
"Wish You Well"	Bernard Fanning	Bernard Fanning	Nominated
Most Performed Country Work
Title	Artist	Writer	Result
"Going Back Home"	Troy Cassar-Daley	Troy Cassar-Daley	Nominated
"Midnight Run"	Travis Sinclair	Travis Sinclair, Garth Porter	Nominated
"The New Bush"	Lee Kernaghan	Garth Porter, Colin Buchanan, Lee Kernaghan	Nominated
"Nothing at All"	Kasey Chambers	Kasey Chambers	Won
"Something that My Heart Does"	The McClymonts	Brooke McClymont, Erik Bernholm	Nominated
Most Performed Dance Work
Title	Artist	Writer	Result
"Flaunt It"	TV Rock featuring Seany B	Sean Berchik, Ivan Gough, Grant Smillie	Won
"I Love It"	Sneaky Sound System	Angus McDonald	Nominated
"Tilt My Hat"	Andy J	Andrew Farriss, Michael Hutchence	Nominated
"Way to Go!"	Rogue Traders	Jamie Appleby, Isaac Moran	Nominated
"We're Coming Home"	Rogue Traders	Jamie Appleby, Melinda Appleby	Nominated
Most Performed Foreign Work
Title	Artist	Writer	Result
"Far Away"	Nickelback	Chad Kroeger, Michael Kroeger, Ryan Peake, Daniel Adair	Nominated
"Feel Better"	Santana featuring Steve Tyler	Burleigh Johnson, Damon Johnson, James Scoggin	Won
"Forever Young"	Youth Group	Marian Gold, Bernhard Lloyd, Frank Mertens	Nominated
"Love Generation"	Bob Sinclar	Gary Pine, Christophe Le Friant (aka Bob Sinclar), Jean-Guy Schreiner, Alain Wisniak, Duane Harden	Nominated
"Talk"	Coldplay	Ralf Hütter, Karl Bartos, Guy Berryman, Jonathan Buckland, William Champion, Chris Martin, Emil Schult	Nominated
Most Performed Jazz Work
Title	Artist	Writer	Result
"Bungalow"	The Catholics	Lloyd Swanton	Nominated
"Complicated Woman"	Mark Sholtez	Mark Sholtez	Nominated
"Dream About You"	Mark Sholtez	Mark Sholtez	Nominated
"Love Me for the Cool"	Mark Sholtez	Mark Sholtez	Won
"Village"	David Jones & Friends	Anthony Gould, David Jones, Ian Robertson	Nominated
Most Performed Urban Work
Title	Artist	Writer	Result
"Get Up Outta the Dirt"	Butterfingers	Eddie Jacobson	Won
"Hold On"	Phrase	Harley Webster, Jan Skubiszewski, Daniel Merriweather	Nominated
"In Front of Me"	Tzu	Joel Ma, Corey McGregor, Pip Norman, Shehab Tariq	Nominated
"It's About to Blow"	DJ Peril	Jason Foretti, Nathan Barbatiello, Christopher Drew	Nominated
"Superstar"	Jade MacRae	Jade MacRae, Dwaine Cruz, Charles Lomu	Nominated
=== Classical Music Awards ===
Best Composition by an Australian Composer
Title		Composer	Result
Birthday Tango		Roger Smalley	Won
Mother Tongue		Liza Lim	Nominated
O Venezia: Part 1		Graham Hair	Nominated
The Silence		Iain Grandage	Nominated
Viola Concerto		Brett Dean	Nominated
Best Performance of an Australian Composition
Title	Composer	Performer	Result
Inferno for Clarinet and Chamber Ensemble	Margery Smith	David Rowen (soloist), Sydney Omega Ensemble	Nominated
Bright Forms Return	Gillian Whitehead	Halcyon and Flinders Quartet	Nominated
Symphony No. 2	Carl Vine	Queensland Youth Symphony	Nominated
When the Clock Strikes Me	Nigel Westlake	Rebecca Lagos (soloist), Sydney Symphony	Won
Instrumental Work of the Year
Title	Composer	Performer	Result
Dawn Day Dusk	Caroline Szeto	Satsuko Odamura, Denis Cowdy	Nominated
Di Primavera	Maria Grenfell	David Malone	Nominated
For Leunig Pieces	Maria Grenfell	David Malone	Nominated
Piano Trio	Ross Edwards	The Australian Trio	Won
Long-Term Contribution to the Advancement of Australian Music
Artist or Organisation			Result
Belinda Webster			Nominated
Ian Cleworth			Won
John Pochée			Nominated
Tristram Cary			Nominated
Orchestral Work of the Year
Title	Composer	Performer	Result
Flying Banner (After Wang To)	Liza Lim	Sydney Symphony, Gianluigi Gelmetti (conductor)	Won
Percussion Concerto	Matthew Hindson	The Queensland Orchestra, Evelyn Glennie, Takuo Yuasa (conductor)	Nominated
Tivoli Dances	Graeme Koehne	Tasmanian Symphony Orchestra, Arvo Volmer (conductor)	Nominated
Welcome to the MCG	Christopher Gordon	Melbourne Symphony Orchestra, Lyn Williams (conductor)	Nominated
Outstanding Contribution by an Individual
Individual		Work	Result
Claire Edwardes (Duo Vertigo)		Duyfken Project	Won
David Malone		Fretsongs CD Project	Nominated
Elena Kats-Chernin		activities in 2006	Nominated
Liza Lim		Sydney Symphony Composer Residency	Nominated
Outstanding Contribution by an Organisation
Organisation		Work	Result
Aurora Festival Committee		2006 Auroroa Festival of New Music	Won
The Australian Ballet, Australian Youth Orchestra, Sonic Art Ensemble		Body Torque	Nominated
Topology Ensemble		2006 Concert Series at the Brisbane Powerhouse	Nominated
Outstanding Contribution to Australian Music in Education
Organisation		Work	Result
Australian Youth Orchestra, The Australian Ballet		2006 National Music Camp Composition Program, Body Torque	Won
MLC School, Sonic Arts Ensemble		Sounding the Score Student Composition project	Nominated
Newington College		Gerard Brophy Residency Project	Nominated
Sydney Symphony Education Program		Sydney Symphony Sinfonietta Composition project	Nominated
Tasmanian Symphony Orchestra		Australian Composers' School	Nominated
Outstanding Contribution to Australian Music in a Regional Area
Organisation		Work	Result
Camden Haven Music Festival Committee		2006 Camden Haven Music Festival	Won
Co-Opera		Tour of Becky Llewelyn's The Portrait	Nominated
Paul Jarman		Mountains Touching Sea project (Coffs Harbour, New South Wales)	Nominated
TalkOz		2006 National Regional Tour	Nominated
Vocal or Choral Work of the Year
Title	Composer	Performer	Result
Daragang Magayon Cantata	Bruce Crossman, Merlinda Bobis	Lotte Latukefu, Merlinda Bobis, Ian Munro	Nominated
May you Dance	Sarah Hopkins	The People of Childers	Won
=== Screen Music Awards ===
Feature Film Score of the Year
Title		Composer	Result
Irresistible		David Hirschfelder	Nominated
Miss Potter		Nigel Westlake	Won
Noise		Bryony Marks	Nominated
The Book of Revelation		Cezary Skubiszewski	Nominated
Best Music for an Advertisement
Title		Composer	Result
NAPCAN – "Children See"		Hylton Mowday	Won
"Ears vs Eyes"		Paul Healy, Antony Partos, Matteo Zingales	Nominated
Coca-Cola – "Endless Summer"		Haydn Walker	Nominated
Tiger – "Paris"		Elliott Wheeler	Nominated
Best Music for Children's Television
Title		Composer	Result
Dust Echoes – "Dust Echoes 2"		Luke Jurevicius	Won
Lockie Leonard – "The Human Torpedo"		Daniel Denholm	Nominated
Pirate Islands 2: The Lost Treasure of Fiji – "Episode 13"		Art Phillips	Nominated
Staines Down Drains – "Episode 22: Pipe Dreams"		Michael Lira	Nominated
Best Music for a Documentary
Title		Composer	Result
Bomb Harvest		Caitlin Yeo	Won
Constructing Australia: Pipe Dreams		James Lee	Nominated
Life		Nerida Tyson-Chew	Nominated
The Floating Brothel		Brett Aplin	Nominated
Best Music for a Mini-Series or Telemovie
Title		Composer	Result
Joanne Lees: Murder in the Outback		Guy Gross	Nominated
Stepfather of the Bride		Nigel Westlake	Won
Supernova II		Paul Healy, Russell Thornton	Nominated
The King – The Graham Kennedy Story		Bryony Marks	Nominated
Best Music for a Short Film
Title		Composer	Result
Balloon		Hylton Mowday	Nominated
Iron Bird		Ash Gibson Greig	Won
Professor Pebbles		Ash Gibson Greig	Nominated
Yolk		Matthew Fitzgerald, Pete Kelly, Tom Schutzinger	Nominated
Best Music for a Television Series or Serial
Series or Serial	Episode title	Composer	Result
All Saints	"Episode 393"	Matteo Zingales	Nominated
Dangerous	"Episode 7"	Alan John, Steven Francis	Nominated
McLeod's Daughters	"Episode 177"	Alastair Ford	Nominated
Two Twisted	"Delivery Man"	Nerida Tyson-Chew	Won
Best Original Song Composed for the Screen
Song title	Work	Composer	Result
"Ballet Theme"	Let Me Not	Nicholas Buc	Nominated
"He Is Not Alone"	The Bet	John Gray	Won
"This is Life"	Life	Richard Porteous	Nominated
"Together Now"	Opening Ceremony of the Asian Games	Iva Davies	Nominated
Best Soundtrack Album
Title		Composer	Result
Jindabyne		Paul Kelly, Dan Luscombe	Nominated
Kenny		Richard Pleasance	Nominated
Miss Potter		Nigel Westlake	Won
The Book of Revelation		Cezary Skubiszewski	Nominated
Best Television Theme
Title		Composer	Result
David Tench Tonight		David Chapman	Nominated
Staines Down Drains		Michael Lira	Won
The King – The Graham Kennedy Story		Bryony Marks	Nominated
Two Twisted		Nerida Tyson-Chew	Nominated
International Achievement Award
Artist			Result
The Wiggles: Murray Cook, Jeff Fatt, Anthony Field, John Field, Greg Page			Won
Most Performed Screen Composer – Australia
Composer			Result
Chris Harriott			Nominated
Jay Stewart			Won
Neil Sutherland			Nominated
Brenton White			Nominated
Most Performed Screen Composer – Overseas
Composer			Result
Murray Cook, Jeff Fatt, Anthony Field, John Field, Greg Page (The Wiggles)			Won
Garry McDonald, Laurie Stone			Nominated
Chris Pettifer			Nominated
Neil Sutherland			Nominated

== See also ==
- Music of Australia
