= Cold Hard Bitch =

2004 single by Jet

Single by Jet

from the album Get Born
- B-side: "Everlovin' Man"; "Ain't That a Lotta Love"; "You Don't Look the Same" (demo)
- Released: 9 February 2004
- Studio: Sunset Sound; Larrabee East (Los Angeles)
- Genre: Alternative rock
- Length: 4:03
- Label: Capitol; Elektra
- Songwriters: Chris Cester; Nic Cester; Cameron Muncey
- Producer: Dave Sardy

Jet singles chronology
"Look What You've Done" (2004)	"Cold Hard Bitch" (2004)	"Get Me Outta Here" (2004)

Music video
- "Cold Hard Bitch" on YouTube

"Cold Hard Bitch" is a song by Australian rock band Jet, released as the fourth single (second in the United States) from their 2003 debut album, Get Born. The song was written by band members Chris Cester, Nic Cester, and Cameron Muncey. Heavily inspired by prior heavy bands such as AC/DC, the song is one of the heaviest in the group's catalogue, being a tough hard rock tune with a simplistic chord structure.

The song was released in the United States on 9 February 2004 and in Australia on 26 July 2004. In addition to peaking at number 33 in Australia, it topped the US Billboard Mainstream Rock Tracks and Modern Rock Tracks charts while reaching number 55 on the Billboard Hot 100. In Canada, the song reached number two on the Radio & Records Rock Top 30, while in Europe, it charted in the United Kingdom, peaking at number 34 in September 2004.

== Background and single history ==
Band-members Chris Cester, Nic Cester, and Cameron Muncey composed the tune. An embryonic version of it appeared on Jet's 2002 release Dirty Sweet (also known as Dirty Sweet EP), a four-song work from the band's early days. "Cold Hard Bitch" received a large scale release when the group's debut studio album, Get Born, came out on 14 September 2003.

The group's debut single, "Are You Gonna Be My Girl", became Jet's signature song and gained significant chart success in the US, making it their most successful hit there. That song had considerable pop radio airplay and peaked No. 29 on the Billboard Hot 100. "Cold Hard Bitch" came out several months later and peaked No. 55 on the Hot 100, yet it was more successful on rock and roll radio stations, reaching No. 1 on Billboard's Modern Rock Tracks for three weeks. "Cold Hard Bitch" gave the band their only number-one Modern Rock hit in the US: their prior hit, "Are You Gonna Be My Girl", had peaked at No. 3. The single also became their sole No. 1 on the Mainstream Rock Tracks chart, spending eight weeks at the top, whereas their prior hit peaked at No. 7.

Strongly influenced by past hard rock groups such as AC/DC, "Cold Hard Bitch" features a simplistic chord structure that emphasizes the guitar playing and bassline. In terms of a critical response, the song received praise from AllMusic's MacKenzie Wilson, who viewed it as having a "sultry" edge. However, in his other positive review of Get Born, music critic Tim Sendra, also of AllMusic, panned "Cold Hard Bitch". He argued that it was the "only track that really falters" on the release due to it being "silly and mean-spirited", constituting "an ill-advised trip down Nazareth lane" that "leaves the listener with a foul taste in their mouth".

At the APRA Music Awards of 2005, "Cold Hard Bitch" was nominated for Most Performed Australian Work Overseas but lost to "Are You Gonna Be My Girl". In the following year, three Jet tracks were nominated for the same category with "Are You Gonna Be My Girl" again winning over "Cold Hard Bitch" and "Look What You've Done". The music video for the single shows the band performing in a bar, playing pinball, and talking to women, generally giving off a 'guys night out' atmosphere.

== Track listings ==
All tracks are written by Chris Cester, Nic Cester, and Cameron Muncey unless otherwise shown

Australian CD single
No.	Title	Writer(s)	Length
1.	"Cold Hard Bitch"
2.	"Everlovin' Man"	Ian Clyne, Gerry Humphrys, Gavin Anderson, Rob Lovett, Kim Lynch
3.	"Ain't That a Lotta Love"	Homer Banks, William Dean Parker
4.	"You Don't Look the Same" (demo)	C. Cester, N. Cester
5.	"Cold Hard Bitch" (live)

UK CD single
No.	Title	Writer(s)	Length
1.	"Cold Hard Bitch"
2.	"Everlovin' Man"	Clyne, Humphrys, Anderson, Lovett, Lynch

UK 7-inch single
No.	Title	Writer(s)	Length
1.	"Cold Hard Bitch"
2.	"Move On" (live at Brixton Academy)	N. Cester, C. Cester

UK DVD single
No.	Title	Writer(s)	Length
1.	"Cold Hard Bitch" (video)
2.	"Rollover DJ" (video—international version)
3.	"Cold Hard Bitch" (audio)
4.	"Sweet Young Thing" (audio)	Edward C. Cobb

== Charts ==
=== Weekly charts ===
Chart (2004)	Peak position
Australia (ARIA)	33
Canada (Nielsen BDS)	20
Canada Rock Top 30 (Radio & Records)	2
Scotland Singles (OCC)	35
UK Singles (OCC)	34
US Billboard Hot 100	55
US Alternative Airplay (Billboard)	1
US Mainstream Rock (Billboard)	1

=== Year-end charts ===
Chart (2004)	Position
US Mainstream Rock Tracks (Billboard)	3
US Modern Rock Tracks (Billboard)	7

== Release history ==
Region	Date	Format(s)	Label(s)	Ref.
United States	9 February 2004	Mainstream rock; active rock; alternative radio	Elektra	
Australia	26 July 2004	CD	Capitol	
United Kingdom	6 September 2004	7-inch vinyl; CD; DVD	Elektra	
