= Neil Sutherland (composer) =

New Zealand-born Australian-based composer

- Born: Neil Campbell Sutherland; New Zealand
- Origin: Sydney, New South Wales, Australia
- Occupations: Composer; musician
- Instrument: Piano
- Years active: 1989–present
- Website: neilsutherlandmusic.com.au

Neil Campbell Sutherland is a New Zealand-born, Australian-based screen music composer and musician. His work on Getaway (1994–present), MythBusters (2003–2016), Border Security (2004–present), Dancing with the Stars (2004–present) and Bondi Vet (2009–2016) has resulted in 14 consecutive Most Performed Screen Composer – Overseas Awards at the Australasian Performing Right Association (APRA) Awards from 2008 to 2021.

== Biography ==
Neil Campbell Sutherland was born in New Zealand. He started music lessons from the age of 6 and during the 1970s trained in classical piano. Sutherland formed a rock band, while a teenager, which toured New Zealand. He relocated to Australia at age 21.

In 1989 Sutherland joined a TV music company, working as a screen composer. Two years later he formed his own company, Musication, in Sydney and continued creating and arranging music for TV and film. From 1989 to 1994 he was a co-composer for TV science, information series, Beyond 2000. From 1990 to 1993 Sutherland provided music for teen-orientated soap opera, E Street. He composed original music for life-style, travel series, Getaway from 1994. An early feature film he worked on was Rainbow's End (1995).

Sutherland and Chris Harriott scored the first season of rural, family drama, McLeod's Daughters (2001). The composer has provided the theme and background music for TV science, entertainment series MythBusters since 2003 (after the pilot episodes). The show was created by Australian-born producer, Peter Rees, for Beyond Television Productions, which had produced Sutherland's earlier series, Beyond 2000.

In 2004 he provided music for a mini-documentary series, National Treasures, of at least 11 episodes of four or five minutes each, including "Bradman's Bat", "Endeavour Journal" and "The Sentimental Bloke Film" for Screen Australia, which were televised by Australian Broadcasting Corporation (ABC) and presented by Warren Brown. Additional episodes in the National Treasures series, also scored by Sutherland, but hosted by Chris Taylor, were available online in 2009.

Also in 2004 Sutherland began his association with TV observational documentary series, Border Security: Australia's Front Line and celebrity competition, Dancing with the Stars. At the APRA Music Awards of 2005 Sutherland won two categories, Best Television Theme for Colour of War: The Anzacs (2004) and Most Performed Screen Composer – Australia. In 2008 he provided the theme for the Australian revival of the sports entertainment show, Gladiators. At the APRA Music Awards of 2008 he won Most Performed Screen Composer – Overseas and was nominated for Most Performed Screen Composer – Australia.

He scored the factual, medical series, Bondi Vet, from 2009, and the factual, police observational series, RBT from 2010. He composed music for both seasons of reality TV series, Keeping up with the Joneses (2010–2011).

Sutherland won his 14th consecutive Most Performed Screen Composer – Overseas Award at the APRA Music Awards of 2021 for his body of work including Border Security, MythBusters, Dancing with the Stars, Getaway and Bondi Vet.

== Awards and nominations ==
=== APRA Music Awards ===
The APRA Music Awards are presented annually from 1982 by the Australasian Performing Right Association (APRA), "honouring composers and songwriters." After 2002 they also include the associated Screen Music Awards handed out by APRA, Australasian Mechanical Copyright Owners Society (AMCOS) and Australian Guild of Screen Composers (AGSC), which "acknowledges excellence and innovation in the field of screen composition."

Year	Nominee / work	Award	Result	Ref.
2005	Neil Sutherland	Most Performed Screen Composer – Australia	Won	
2005	Colour of War: The Anzacs (Sutherland)	Best Television Theme	Won	
2006	Sutherland	Most Performed Screen Composer – Australia	Nominated	
2006	Sutherland	Most Performed Screen Composer – Overseas	Nominated	
2007	Sutherland	Most Performed Screen Composer – Australia	Nominated	
2007	Sutherland	Most Performed Screen Composer – Overseas	Nominated	
2008	Sutherland	Most Performed Screen Composer – Australia	Nominated	
2008	Sutherland	Most Performed Screen Composer – Overseas	Won	
2009	Sutherland	Most Performed Screen Composer – Australia	Nominated	
2009	Sutherland	Most Performed Screen Composer – Overseas	Won	
2010	Sutherland	Most Performed Screen Composer – Australia	Nominated	
2010	Sutherland	Most Performed Screen Composer – Overseas	Won	
2011	Sutherland	Most Performed Screen Composer – Australia	Nominated	
2011	Sutherland	Most Performed Screen Composer – Overseas	Won	
2012	Sutherland	Most Performed Screen Composer – Australia	Nominated	
2012	Sutherland	Most Performed Screen Composer – Overseas	Won	
2013	Sutherland	Most Performed Screen Composer – Australia	Nominated	
2013	Sutherland	Most Performed Screen Composer – Overseas	Won	
2014	Sutherland	Most Performed Screen Composer – Australia	Nominated	
2014	Sutherland	Most Performed Screen Composer – Overseas	Won	
2015	Sutherland	Most Performed Screen Composer – Australia	Nominated	
2015	Sutherland	Most Performed Screen Composer – Overseas	Won	
2016	Sutherland	Most Performed Screen Composer – Australia	Nominated	
2016	Sutherland	Most Performed Screen Composer – Overseas	Won	
2017	Sutherland	Most Performed Screen Composer – Australia	Nominated	
2017	Sutherland	Most Performed Screen Composer – Overseas	Won	
2018	Sutherland	Most Performed Screen Composer – Australia	Nominated	
2018	Sutherland	Most Performed Screen Composer – Overseas	Won	
2019	Sutherland	Most Performed Screen Composer – Australia	Nominated	
2019	Sutherland	Most Performed Screen Composer – Overseas	Won	
2020	Sutherland	Most Performed Screen Composer – Overseas	Won	
2021	Sutherland	Most Performed Screen Composer – Overseas	Won	
