= Michael McMartin =

Canadian-Australian music manager (1945–2024)

Michael McMartin OAM
- Born: Michael Arthur McMartin; 12 March 1945; British Columbia, Canada
- Died: 31 March 2024 (aged 79); Berry, New South Wales, Australia
- Education: Loyola College, Montreal
- Occupations: Music manager, music businessman
- Years active: c. 1970s–2024
- Spouse: Saskia McMartin
- Children: 1
- Awards: APRA Music Award (2007)
- Honours: Medal of The Order of Australia (2015)

Michael Arthur McMartin OAM (12 March 1945 – 31 March 2024) was a Canadian-Australian music manager and businessman.

== Early life and education ==
Michael Arthur McMartin was born on Vancouver Island on 12 March 1945. McMartin graduated from Loyola College in Montreal, majoring in political science. He relocated to Australia in 1971.

== Career ==
A few years after relocating to Australia, McMartin co-founded Trafalgar Records with Charles Fisher, a studio that signed artists and bands including Radio Birdman, Robyn Archer, 1927 and Gyan Evans.

In 1985, McMartin founded Melody Management, whose first client was the Hoodoo Gurus. McMartin was the manager of the band until stepping down in February 2024 due to health issues.

McMartin was a founding member of the Australian Music Managers Forum. He served as chairman and then executive director of the International Music Managers Forum. McMartin was a board member of the Support Act, a music industry charity, for 19 years, from 1997 to 2016. McMartin was a lifetime member of Australian Music Managers Forum and a patron of the Association of Australian Artist Managers. He was a member of LEADR, a mediation association.

McMartin received the APRA Ted Albert Award in 2007 and the Medal of the Order of Australia in 2015. His long-term clients Hoodoo Gurus were inducted into the ARIA Hall of Fame in 2007.

Michael McMartin is the namesake of the eponymous Michael's Rule which emerged after he urged the return of an industry code requiring at least one local, i.e. Australian, act on international tours. In his memory, at the 2024 AAM Awards the organisation and its members, who represent virtually every major artist in the country, called on Australian concert promoters to reinstate the policy now known as ‘Michael’s Rule’. Since 5 May 2025 the adoption now awards shows with a venue hire fee reduction of $20,000 for each eligible show across the Venues NSW Network, and a $5000 reduction at Sydney Opera House.

== Personal life and death ==
McMartin resided in Cambewarra, New South Wales as of 2015. He was married to Saskia and had a son.

McMartin died at a hospital in Berry, New South Wales on 31 March 2024, 19 days after his 79th birthday, after having suffered from cancer.
