= Colour of War: The Anzacs =

Australian TV series

Colour of War: The Anzacs is a three part Australian TV series narrated by Russell Crowe, first shown in 2004 on Nine Network. It details, in rare colour footage, the story of the ANZACs during both World War II, the Korean War, and the Vietnam War.

== Production ==
The series was produced by Film Australia in association with TWI Australia Pty Ltd, the Australian arm of the international production company for the Nine Network, along with Television New Zealand’s Internal Production Unit. The series was narrated by Russell Crowe, whose grandfather was a war cinematographer. Further, the research found rare colour footage of troops in Crete, Italy and North Africa in the 1940s, in the snows of Korea in the 1950s and the jungles of Vietnam in the 1960s. Much of the material was shot unofficially by civilians and servicemen, providing a direct account of life at that time.

== Episodes ==
- Episode 1: "Children of the Empire" – When Great Britain declares war with Germany in 1939, the Anzac nations follow.
- Episode 2: "Fighting Back" – While the fight continues for victory in Europe and the Pacific, the Anzac homefronts are preoccupied with their own problems.
- Episode 3: "The War That Never Ends" – The Cold War brings the nuclear race to our nation's backyard and our troops take up the fight against communism in Korea and then Vietnam.

== Reception ==
According to National Film and Sound Archive:

This is the story of Australia and New Zealand at war as never seen before. For the first time, only original colour footage is used to paint a vividly detailed picture of these closely allied nations, from the build up to World War II to the end of the Vietnam War. Newly discovered films and home movies along with diary and letter extracts allow viewers a very personal connection with the war experience, both on the battlefield and on the homefront. In colour, that shared history becomes even more intimate and involving.

Another review by Lisa Pryor of The Sydney Morning Herald comments that:

This is not just another war documentary, the kind that are endlessly spooled on pay television. It is striking and remarkable, using colour footage from as early as the 1930s that shows Australians at war at home and overseas. Pieced together into a semi-chronological narrative are home movies of sons preparing to leave for war, shipwrecked POWs being rescued by a submarine and pictures of Singapore, complete with hand-drawn rickshaws, before it fell to the Japanese. It takes a little while to adjust to the colour footage, which seems so much associated with the era after World War II. But that is the strength of this series, that the soldiers, prisoners and refugees look so much like people who could be alive today. Actor Russell Crowe is the narrator, an appropriate choice given that his grandfather, Stan Wemyss, was a cinematographer in the Solomon Islands during World War II.

At the APRA Music Awards of 2005, composer Neil Sutherland won Best Television Theme for his work on Colour of War: The Anzacs.

== Media ==
=== DVD ===
- Released: 2 December 2004
- Catalogue Number: R-104518-9
- Rating: M
- Actor: Russell Crowe
- Audio Dolby Digital 2.0
- Subtitles: English
- Discs: 1
- Running Time: 135 minutes
