= Mark Wilson (musician) =

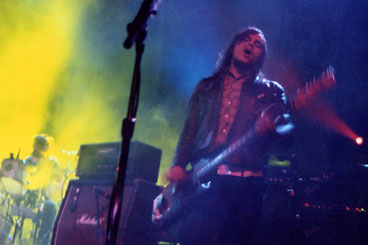
- Performing with Jet in 2004

Background information
- Born: Mark Andrew Wilson; 5 August 1980 (age 46); Geelong, Victoria, Australia
- Genre: Indie rock
- Occupation: Musician
- Instruments: Bass; piano; harmonica; backing vocals; percussion; synthesiser; sampler
- Years active: 2001–2012; 2016–present

Mark Andrew Wilson (born 5 August 1980) is an Australian musician, originally from Geelong. From 2002 to 2012, and since their 2017 comeback, he has played bass guitar for the Melbourne-based rock band, Jet. He was asked to join them by three founding members, Nic Cester, Chris Cester and Cameron Muncey, but initially refused out of loyalty to his then-current group, The CA$inos. Days later he rang up Muncey and the Cesters and agreed to join their group instead.

Wilson mainly plays vintage Fender Precision Basses in either sunburst or white, as well as an Epiphone Jack Casady signature bass in the Are You Gonna Be My Girl video, and a Gibson Thunderbird as of 2024. He always plays with a pick. Wilson also plays piano on some tracks ("Look What You've Done", "Seventeen", "She Holds a Grudge"), and occasional percussion, samples, synthesizer, and harmonica. He sometimes provides backing vocals ("Rollover DJ", "Beat on Repeat", "Times Like This") He co-wrote "Start the Show" with guitarist, Muncey. On 24 October 2007 Chris Cester and Wilson co-wrote and, under the name, The Vice Lords, produced a song, "I Spy I Spy", for the Japanese former duo, Superfly.

In 2011 Wilson and Chris Cester formed a side project, DamnDogs as a "doom-disco" band, with Louis Macklin on keyboards (touring member of Jet), and Mitch McIvor (Cester's cousin) on guitar. On 9 August they issued a five-track extended play, Strange Behaviour. In March 2012, Jet disbanded and Wilson had left DamnDogs.

In 2016, Wilson returned to playing music, playing bass in Peter Garrett's backing band, The Alter Egos. Months later, it was announced that Jet would be reuniting in 2017 to open for Bruce Springsteen on his Australian tour.

== Instruments and equipment ==
=== Electric bass ===
- Fender Precision
- Epiphone Jack Casady
- Gibson Thunderbird

=== Acoustic bass ===
- Takamine Acoustic Bass

=== Amplifiers/heads ===
- Ampeg SVT Classic Amp Head
- Ampeg SVT810 Bass Box
- Fender TB-1200 Head
- Fender Pro Series Bass Amps
