= Vincent Plush =

Australian composer and musicologist (b.1950)

- Born: 18 April 1950 (age 76); Adelaide, Australia
- Genre: Classical
- Occupation: Composer

Vincent Plush (born 18 April 1950, Adelaide) is an Australian composer, music critic, teacher, conductor, impresario, and musicologist. Baker’s Biographical Dictionary of Musicians (2001) describes Plush as a "remarkable Australian composer".

He studied under the composer Richard Meale at the University of Adelaide where he completed a Bachelor of Music degree in composition and music education. In the 1970s, he moved to Sydney and taught composition and 20th-century music history at the NSW State Conservatorium of Music (now Sydney Conservatorium of Music). In 1976, he founded the Seymour Group. He began working for the Australian Broadcasting Corporation as radio producer and commentator, roles that have continued.

In 1981, Plush was awarded a Harkness Fellowship and spent time at Yale University researching American composers. He writes about classical music for The Australian newspaper and has contributed to Limelight magazine.

In 2013 he returned to the University of Adelaide to undertake doctoral studies and received the PhD in music in 2018. His thesis, "Music in the Life and Work of Patrick White", is in preparation for publication in book form as "Patrick White and Music."

== Awards ==
=== Classical Music Award ===
The 2005 Classical Music Awards (now Art Music Awards) were presented by APRA and the Australian Music Centre, at Verbrugghen Hall, Sydney Conservatorium of Music, on 18 July 2005. Plush won in the category Most Distinguished Contribution to the Presentation of Australian Music by an Individual for the 'Voices' program in the 2004 Brisbane Writers Festival.

== Selected works ==
=== Dramatic ===
- Australian Folksongs, musical theatre piece for Baritone and Ensemble (Sydney, July 19, 1977)
- The Maitland and Morpeth String Quartet for Narrator and String Quartet (Sydney, April 1, 1979; rev. 1985)
- Facing the Danger for Narrator and Instruments, after the poem Say No by Barbara Berman (1982; Las Vegas, Jan. 18, 1983)
- Grody to the Max for “Val”-(i.e. San Fernando “Valley Girl”) speaker and Trumpeter (1983)
- The Wakefield Chronicles, pageant for Narrator, Solo Trumpet and Trombone, and Ensemble, after Edward Gibbon Wakefield (Adelaide, March 5, 1986)
- The Muse of Fire for Narrator, Baritone, Trumpet, Flute, Piano, Chorus, 2 Brass Bands, Children’s Chorus, and Organ, after Andrew Torning (1986–87)
- Funereal Rites, a concert drama for 6 singers and piano (1994, commissioned by The Song Company)

=== Orchestral ===
- Pacifica (1986; rev. 1987; Aspen, July 10, 1988); Concord/Eendracht (Utrecht, May 18, 1990)
- Pilbara for Strings (1991)

=== Brass band ===
- The Wakefield Chorales (1986)
- March of the Dalmatians (1987)

=== Chamber ===
- Aurores for Horn, Piano, and Ensemble (from O Paraguay!; Kensington, New South Wales, July 31, 1979)
- Bakery Hill Rising for Solo Horn and 8 Other Horns (1980; Ballarat, Victoria, Feb. 14, 1981)
- On Shooting Stars—Homage to Victor Jam for Ensemble (Sydney, Sept. 11, 1981)
- FireRaisers, “Concertino in the Style of a Vaudeville Entertainment” for Trumpet and Ensemble (Brisbane, Queensland, Sept. 30, 1984)
- Gallipoli Sunrise for Tenor Trombone and 7 Other Trombones (1984)
- Helices for Percussion Quartet (from The Wakefield Chronicles; 1985)
- The Wakefield Convocation for Brass Quintet (1985)
- The Wakefield Invocation for Trumpet and Organ (1986)
- The Ludlow Lullabies for Violin and Piano (Colorado Springs, Oct. 19, 1989)
- SkyFire for 10 Pianos and Tape (Colorado Springs, Nov. 19, 1989)
- Aunt Kelly’s Book of Tangos for Violin, Cello, and Piano (1990)
- Florilegium I, II, and III (Sydney, Sept. 28, 1990)
- Los Dios de Los Muertos for Percussion Quartet (1990)
- The Love-Songs of Herbert Hoover for Horn Trio (1991)

=== Pieces for solo instruments ===
- Franz Liszt Sleeps Alone for piano (1986, commissioned by Sonya Hanke)
- Piano nocturne (1985; Budapest, March 12, 1986)
- Encompassings for Organ (Canberra, March 16, 1975)
- Herr Beethoven's Audiologist for Bassoon (2020)

=== Tape ===
- Estuary (1978)
- Stevie Wonder’s Music for Flute and Tape (Sydney, Nov. 4, 1979)
- All Ears (1985)
- Metropolis: Sydney (WDR, Cologne, Nov. 14, 1988)

=== Vocal ===
- Magnificat for Soprano, Flute, and 3 Vocal Quartets (1970; Sydney, Sept. 8, 1976)
- 3 Carols for Soprano, Contralto, and Children’s Chorus (1978, 1979, 1982)
- The Hymn of the Winstanly Levellers for Speaking/Singing Chorus (Sydney, May 23, 1981)
- Ode to Knocks for Mixed Voices and Instruments (Knox, Victoria, Sept. 6, 1981)
- Letters from the Antipodes: 6 English Reflections on Colonial Australia for Small Chorus (1984; Sydney, July 9, 1989)
- All Ears, radiophonie composition for Voices (Radio 2MBS-FM, Sydney, March 16, 1985)
- The Muse of Fire, pageant for Voices and Instruments (Penrith, New South Wales, Oct. 17, 1987)
- Cornell Ceremonial Music for Brass Instruments and Chorus (Winter Park, Fla., Nov. 10, 1988)
- Andrew Torning’s March to Victory for Small Chorus and Piano (1989)
- The Arraignment of Henry Lawson for Voices and Instruments (1991)

== Selected publications ==
- “Frederick Delius in Florida,” in Speaking of Music: A selection of talks from ABC Radio by eminent musicians, composers and conductors, ABC, Sydney, 1990: 144–50.
- “On Catfish Row: The story of Porgy and Bess,” in 24 Hours (now Limelight), ABC, Sydney, January 1994.
- Twenty-nine interviews, 2021–2023, in the Art Music in New South Wales oral history collection, State Library of NSW.
