= Look What You've Done =

2003 single by Jet

Single by Jet

from the album Get Born
- B-side: "Bruises"; "Get What You Need"
- Released: 8 March 2004
- Studio: Sunset Sound; Larrabee East (Los Angeles)
- Length: 3:50
- Label: Capitol; Elektra
- Songwriter: Nic Cester
- Producer: Dave Sardy

Jet singles chronology
"Rollover DJ" (2003)	"Look What You've Done" (2004)	"Cold Hard Bitch" (2004)

"Look What You've Done" is a song by Australian rock band Jet, released on 8 March 2004 as the third international and fourth US single from their debut studio album, Get Born (2003). The single was initially issued in the United Kingdom in March before being released in Australia the following month. In the United States, it was serviced to rock radio formats in October 2004.

"Look What You've Done" is Jet's highest-charting single in Australia, peaking at number 14 on the ARIA Singles Chart. The ballad was ranked number 24 on Triple J's Triple J's Hottest 100 of 2004, Australia's largest annual music poll. In addition to its Australian success, "Look What You've Done" became a top-40 hit in Canada, New Zealand, the United Kingdom, and the United States.

== Live performances ==
"Look What You've Done" was performed live for the first time on Saturday Night Live on 13 December 2003. Jet performed the song at benefit concert Live 8 on 2 July 2005. The song was also performed live at the Fuji Rock Festival in 2017.

== Music videos ==
Two music videos were made for the song: One was of the band playing in a forest with animated creatures and a creature abducting them; the other video had band members playing in a white room, surrounded by photos of themselves.

== Awards and nominations ==
=== APRA Awards ===
The APRA Awards are presented annually from 1982 by the Australasian Performing Right Association (APRA).

Awards and nominations for "Look What You've Done"
Year	Nominee / work	Award	Result
2007	"Look What You've Done" – Nicholas Cester	Most Performed Australian Work Overseas	Nominated

== Track listings ==
Australian and UK 12-inch single

A1. "Look What You've Done"
B1. "Bruises"
B2. "Are You Gonna Be My Girl" (acoustic)

European maxi-CD single

1. "Look What You've Done"
2. "Get What You Need"
3. "Bruises"
4. "Are You Gonna Be My Girl" (acoustic version)
5. "Look What You've Done" (live)

UK CD single

1. "Look What You've Done"
2. "Bruises"

UK DVD single

1. "Look What You've Done" (audio)
2. "Back Door Santa" (audio)
3. "Look What You've Done" (music video)
4. "Get What You Need" (live from The Astoria Theatre, London) (video)
5. Behind the scenes footage

== Charts ==
=== Weekly charts ===
Weekly chart performance for "Look What You've Done"
Chart (2004–2005)	Peak position
Australia (ARIA)	14
Canada CHR/Pop Top 30 (Radio & Records)	27
Canada Hot AC Top 30 (Radio & Records)	12
Canada Rock Top 30 (Radio & Records)	6
New Zealand (Recorded Music NZ)	16
Scotland Singles (Official Charts)	20
UK Singles (Official Charts)	28
US Billboard Hot 100	37
US Adult Alternative Airplay (Billboard)	4
US Adult Contemporary (Billboard)	26
US Adult Pop Airplay (Billboard)	9
US Alternative Airplay (Billboard)	3
US Mainstream Rock (Billboard)	33
US Pop Airplay (Billboard)	24

=== Year-end charts ===
2004 year-end chart performance for "Look What You've Done"
Chart (2004)	Position
Australia (ARIA)	89

2005 year-end chart performance for "Look What You've Done"
Chart (2005)	Position
US Adult Top 40 (Billboard)	20
US Modern Rock Tracks (Billboard)	30
US Triple-A (Billboard)	10

== Release history ==
Release dates and formats for "Look What You've Done"
Region	Date	Format(s)	Label(s)	Ref(s).
United Kingdom	8 March 2004	7-inch vinyl; CD	Elektra	
Australia	26 April 2004	12-inch vinyl; CD	Capitol	
United States	4 October 2004	Mainstream rock; active rock; triple A; alternative radio	Elektra	
United States	15 November 2004	Contemporary hit radio	Elektra	
