= Are You Gonna Be My Girl =

2003 single by Jet

Single by Jet

from the album Get Born
- B-side: "Last Chance"; "Hey Kids"; "You Were Right" (demo); "That's Alright Mama" (live)
- Released: 18 August 2003
- Studio: Sunset Sound; Larrabee East (Los Angeles)
- Genre: Garage rock revival
- Length: 3:33
- Label: Capitol; Elektra
- Songwriters: Nic Cester; Cameron Muncey
- Producer: Dave Sardy

Jet singles chronology
"Are You Gonna Be My Girl" (2003)	"Rollover DJ" (2003)

Music video
- "Are You Gonna Be My Girl" on YouTube

"Are You Gonna Be My Girl" is a song by Australian rock band Jet from their 2003 debut album, Get Born. It was released as the first single from the album on 18 August 2003 in the United States and on 1 September 2003 in Australia.

The song peaked at number 20 in Australia and reached the top 20 in Canada, Ireland, New Zealand, and the United Kingdom. In the United States, it reached number 29 on the Billboard Hot 100, making it their first top-40 hit and their highest charting single; it also peaked at number three on the Billboard Modern Rock Tracks chart and number seven on the Billboard Mainstream Rock Tracks chart. The single has sold 1.3 million copies in the United States since 2012.

The song was voted number one in the 2003 Triple J Hottest 100. In January 2018, as part of Triple M's "Ozzest 100", the 'most Australian' songs of all time, "Are You Gonna Be My Girl" was ranked number 38. In 2025, the song placed 23 in the Triple J Hottest 100 of Australian Songs.

== Structure ==
Written by Nic Cester and Cameron Muncey, the song is often cited for similarities to Iggy Pop's "Lust for Life" (particularly its drum pattern and near-identical guitar riff). The band, however, argues that "Are You Gonna Be My Girl" has more in common with 1960s Motown songs, namely "I'm Ready for Love" by Martha and the Vandellas and "You Can't Hurry Love" by the Supremes. Nic Cester said he was influenced by the stop-start structure of "My Generation" by the Who, as well as singers like Mick Jagger and Van Morrison who could "speak" verses and choose lyrics based on diction rather than poetry.

Chris Cester responded to media commentary regarding the similarities, stating in a 2009 interview that the beat was taken from Motown, referring to a meeting between Pop and himself:

It's funny because I asked him point blank about that. He said I was crazy. He said that when he and David Bowie were writing "Lust for Life", they were ripping off Motown's beat. It's funny that he said that to me because we also thought we were ripping off Motown more than "Lust for Life". To be honest with you that kind of annoyed me a lot, because I always thought it was really lazy. People just go well Lust for Life is more well-known so that's what they go for, but if you listen to a song like "You Can't Hurry Love" (The Supremes) I think you'll find its closer to "Are You Gonna Be My Girl" than "Lust for Life" ever was. And that's what Iggy said as well.

== Background ==
Nic Cester wrote an early version of the song sometime between the ages of 17-19. The original lyrics were about being rejected by a girl - with the original hook being "She's just like every other girl". The song was fleshed out by Cameron Muncey, who also convinced Cester to make the lyrics more positive, so he changed the hook to "Are you gonna be my girl".

While the band was recording a demo of the song, the studio microphones picked up the sound of a cough by accident during the introduction. The producers wanted to include that sound in the final mix, but when Nic refused to fake the cough, they copied it from the demo and edited it into the music.

== Music video ==
The music video is shot in black and white, and shows Jet performing in a blank studio. As they play, black ink starts pouring out of their equipment and forms a landscape resembling the cover art on their album Get Born, the Beatles album Revolver and silhouettes of dancing girls. The video was shot at Vinopolis, London. Cameron Muncey can be seen wearing an AC/DC shirt.

== Awards and nominations ==
=== APRA Awards ===
The APRA Awards are presented annually from 1982 by the Australasian Performing Right Association (APRA).

APRA Awards for "Are You Gonna Be My Girl"
Year	Nominee / work	Award	Result
2004	"Are You Gonna Be My Girl"	Song of the Year	Nominated
2005	"Are You Gonna Be My Girl"	Most Performed Australian Work Overseas	Won
2006	"Are You Gonna Be My Girl"	Most Performed Australian Work Overseas	Won
2007	"Are You Gonna Be My Girl"	Most Performed Australian Work Overseas	Won

=== MTV Video Music Awards ===
MTV Video Music Awards for "Are You Gonna Be My Girl"
Year	Nominee / work	Award	Result
2004	"Are You Gonna Be My Girl"	Best New Artist	Nominated
2004	"Are You Gonna Be My Girl"	Best Rock Video	Won
2004	"Are You Gonna Be My Girl"	Best Editing	Nominated

== Track listings ==
Australian CD single

1. "Are You Gonna Be My Girl"
2. "Last Chance"
3. "Hey Kids"
4. "You Were Right" (demo)

Australian 12-inch single

A1. "Are You Gonna Be My Girl"
B1. "Hey Kids"
B2. "That's Alright Mama" (live)

UK CD1

1. "Are You Gonna Be My Girl"
2. "Hey Kids"
3. "You Were Right" (demo)
4. "Are You Gonna Be My Girl" (video)

UK CD2

1. "Are You Gonna Be My Girl" (alternative version)
2. "That's Alright Mama" (live)
3. "Take It or Leave It" (video)

UK DVD single

1. "Are You Gonna Be My Girl" (video)
2. "Rollover DJ" (video)
3. "Are You Gonna Be My Girl" (audio)
4. "Ain't That a Lotta Love" (audio)

European CD single

1. "Are You Gonna Be My Girl"
2. "Cigarettes & Cola"

== Personnel ==
- Nic Cester – vocals, guitar, handclaps
- Cameron Muncey – lead guitar
- Mark Wilson – bass guitar
- Chris Cester – drums, tambourine

== Charts ==
=== Weekly charts ===
2003–2004 weekly chart performance for "Are You Gonna Be My Girl"
Chart (2003–2004)	Peak position
Australia (ARIA)	20
Canada Rock Top 30 (Radio & Records)	15
Germany (GfK)	49
Ireland (IRMA)	18
Netherlands (Dutch Top 40)	21
Netherlands (Single Top 100)	22
New Zealand (Recorded Music NZ)	17
Scotland Singles (Official Charts)	13
UK Singles (Official Charts)	16
UK Rock & Metal (Official Charts)	2
US Billboard Hot 100	29
US Adult Alternative Airplay (Billboard)	5
US Adult Pop Airplay (Billboard)	16
US Alternative Airplay (Billboard)	3
US Mainstream Rock (Billboard)	7
US Pop Airplay (Billboard)	16
US Top 40 Tracks (Billboard)	22

2013 weekly chart performance for "Are You Gonna Be My Girl"
Chart (2013)	Peak position
France (SNEP)	168

2023 weekly chart performance for "Are You Gonna Be My Girl"
Chart (2023)	Peak position
Hungary (Single Top 40)	40

=== Year-end charts ===
2003 year-end chart performance for "Are You Gonna Be My Girl"
Chart (2003)	Position
Australia (ARIA)	96
US Modern Rock Tracks (Billboard)	64

2004 year-end chart performance for "Are You Gonna Be My Girl"
Chart (2004)	Position
US Billboard Hot 100	76
US Mainstream Rock Tracks (Billboard)	35
US Modern Rock Tracks (Billboard)	20
US Triple-A (Billboard)	6

== Certifications ==
Certifications and sales for "Are You Gonna Be My Girl"
Region	Certification	Certified units/sales
Australia (ARIA)	Gold	35,000^{^}
Denmark (IFPI Danmark)	Gold	45,000^{‡}
France (SNEP)	Platinum	200,000^{‡}
Germany (BVMI)	Gold	300,000^{‡}
Italy (FIMI)	Platinum	100,000^{‡}
New Zealand (RMNZ)	3× Platinum	90,000^{‡}
Spain (Promusicae)	Platinum	60,000^{‡}
United Kingdom (BPI)	2× Platinum	1,200,000^{‡}
United States (RIAA)	Gold	500,000^{*}
^{*} Sales figures based on certification alone.^{^} Shipments figures based on certification alone.^{‡} Sales+streaming figures based on certification alone.

== Release history ==
Release dates and formats for "Are You Gonna Be My Girl"
Region	Date	Format(s)	Label(s)	Ref.
United States	18 August 2003	Mainstream rock; active rock; alternative radio	Elektra	
United Kingdom	25 August 2003	12-inch vinyl; CD	Elektra	
Australia	1 September 2003	12-inch vinyl; CD	Capitol	
United States	8 December 2003	Triple A radio	Elektra	
United States	26 January 2004	Contemporary hit radio	Elektra	
United Kingdom (re-release)	24 May 2004	12-inch vinyl; CD; DVD	Elektra	
