= Chris Cester =

Australian musician

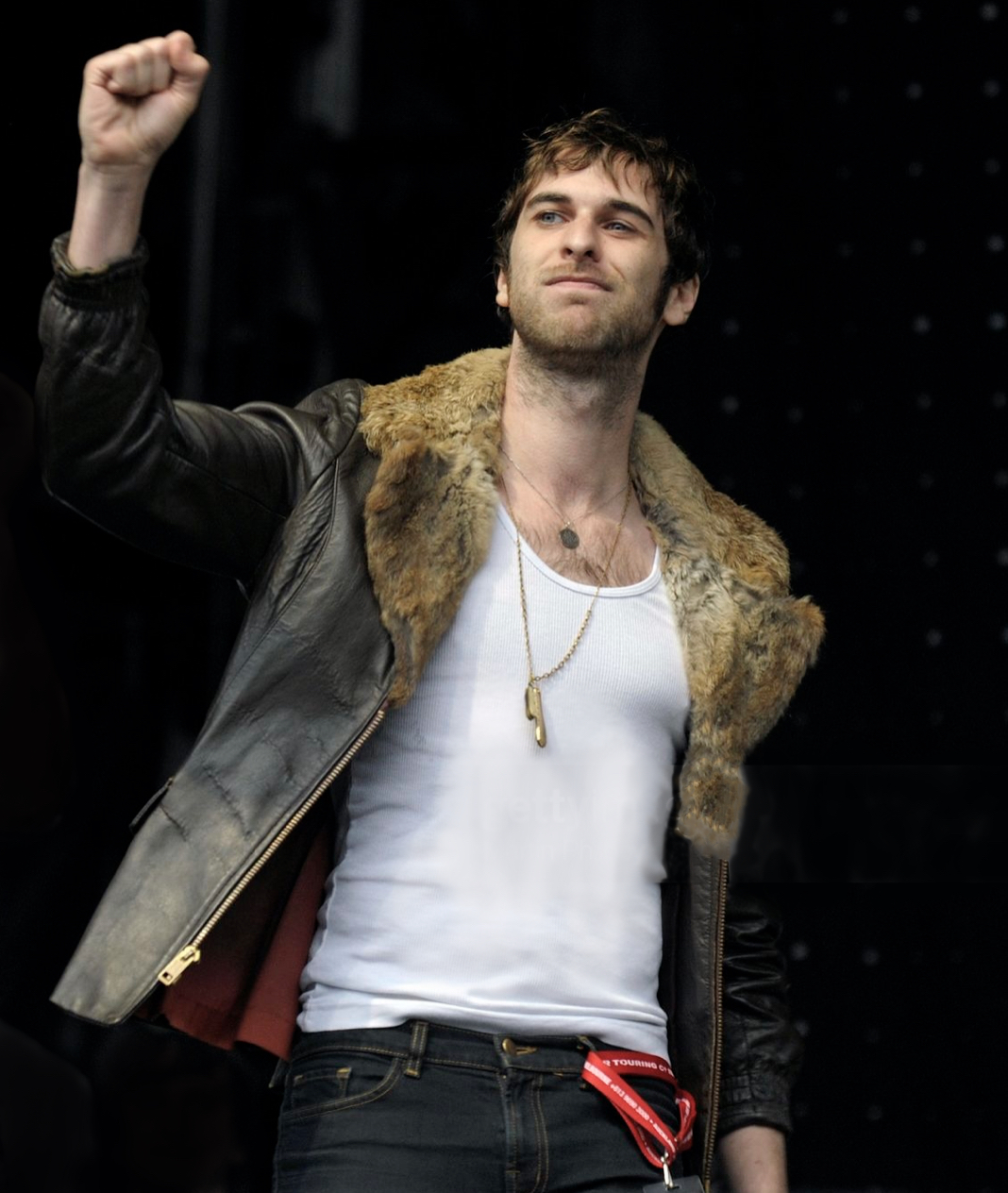
- Chris Cester performing Jet at Australia's Sound Relief in 2009

Background information
- Born: Christopher James Cester; 16 September 1981 (age 45); Melbourne, Victoria, Australia
- Genre: Rock
- Occupation: Musician
- Instruments: Drums; percussion; guitar; vocals
- Years active: 1996–present
- Member of: Mystic Knights
- Formerly of: Jet, DamnDogs, The Jaded Hearts Club

Christopher James Cester (born 16 September 1981) is an Australian musician, songwriter and producer, best known as the co-founder of Australian rock band Jet. Cester served as the band's drummer – as well as providing vocals, percussion and occasionally rhythm guitar – from their 2001 formation until 2024. As a member of Jet, Cester has won awards as a songwriter from the Australasian Performing Right Association (APRA), including in 2005 as Songwriter of the Year, and 2011 for "Seventeen", which won "Most Played Australian Work" and "Rock Work of the Year".

== Early life ==
Christopher James Cester was born in Melbourne, Australia, 16 September 1981. He has one older brother, Nicholas John "Nic" Cester (born 6 July 1979), and two younger brothers. Their parents were both children of immigrants to Australia. Their mother, Helen Isobel née McIvor (born 1957), has Scottish descent; and their father, Giovanni "John" Cester (1957–2004), had Italian descent.

During their childhood, Chris and Nic listened to music their parents liked, including The Beatles' Abbey Road, Stevie Wonder's Hotter Than July, Led Zeppelin, and The Kinks. As kids, the Cester brothers would play pretend gigs in their living room; Chris was the singer, but he eventually took up drums, pretending to play while Nic sang. The boys attended St Bede's College Mentone, where Chris took one year of drum lessons before teaching himself on a drum kit at home independently. An uncle, Eugene Cester (born 1961), known as Eugene de la Hot-Croix Bun, was a member of the Australian alternative/satire rock band TISM, which initially inspired Chris and Nic to pursue careers in music.

== Music career ==
=== 1996 – 2012: Jet ===
In 1996, Chris and Nic Cester formed Jet with Nic's schoolmate Cameron Muncey on guitar and vocals; Mark Wilson joined at a later time on bass guitar. The band used a variety of names before settling on Jet in 2002, named after the 1973 song "Jet" by former Beatle Paul McCartney and his band Wings. Chris primarily played the drums, sang, and wrote songs.

After finishing secondary school, the band began playing pub gigs around Melbourne; Chris and the band worked out songs they were writing, and they played rock covers. These songs would go on to be the tracks that turned into Jet's 2002 extended play, Dirty Sweet. Jet released three studio albums between 2003 and 2009 before disbanding in March 2012.

=== 2011: DamnDogs ===
By mid-2011, Cester had formed his own electro-rock band, DamnDogs, in Los Angeles with a cousin: Mitch McIvor on guitar; Jet's Mark Wilson on bass guitar; and that group's touring keyboardist, Louis Macklin. DamnDogs released a debut five-track EP, Strange Behaviour, on 9 August 2011. DamnDogs played several shows around Los Angeles and in Australia before changing the lineup and turning into a new band iteration.

=== 2016: Mystic Knights of Amnesia ===
In 2016, Cester formed Mystic Knights of Amnesia with Jet's touring keyboardist Louis Macklin to write more experimental rock music. The band was named by Cester's friend Oasis guitarist and songwriter Noel Gallagher. The band was based out of Los Angeles, and the original lineup consisted of Cester on lead vocals, Emmanuel Castro and Aaron Eisenberg on guitar, John Pancost on bass, Jeff Kite on drums, and Macklin on keyboards.

=== 2018–2019: The Jaded Hearts Club ===
Cester was the lead singer of rock supergroup The Jaded Hearts Club from 2018 to 2019. The lineup at the time consisted of Matt Bellamy of Muse, Graham Coxon of Blur, Sean Payne of The Zutons, Ilan Rubin of Nine Inch Nails, and Jamie Davis. Cester sang lead vocals alongside Miles Kane for a year of shows, including South By Southwest in Austin, Texas, and the Teenage Cancer Trust show in the Royal Albert Hall. Nic Cester sang with the band at a secret show in Los Angeles in 2018, and he took Chris's place in the band after Chris sustained a back injury from an accident in 2019.

=== 2024–present: Mystic Knights ===
In 2024, Cester revived the Mystic Knights of Amnesia project without Macklin, rebranding the band as Mystic Knights. Both Eisenberg and Castro returned, with the new line-up being fleshed out by Jacob Pillot on bass and Sebastian Harris on drums. Their debut single, "This High Up", was released on November 20th 2024.

== Equipment ==
Chris uses Gretsch drums, including a Brady 14- x 8-inch Jarrah Ply snare, and Zildjian cymbals. His cymbal setup is a pair of 15-inch A Zildjian New Beat Hats, and he has a 22-inch K Zildjian Dark Ride.

== Awards and nominations ==
=== APRA Awards ===
The APRA Awards are presented annually from 1982 by the Australasian Performing Right Association (APRA).

Year	Nominee / work	Award	Result
2005	"Cold Hard Bitch" – Nicholas Cester, Christopher Cester, Cameron Muncey	Most Performed Australian Work Overseas	Nominated
2005	Jet – Nicholas Cester, Cameron Muncey, Chris Cester	Songwriter of the Year	Won
2006	"Cold Hard Bitch" – Nicholas Cester, Christopher Cester, Cameron Muncey	Most Performed Australian Work Overseas	Nominated
2010	"She's a Genius" – Christopher Cester	Most Played Australian Work	Nominated
2010	"She's a Genius" – Christopher Cester	Rock Work of the Year	Nominated
2011	"Seventeen" – Nicholas Cester, Christopher Cester, Cameron Muncey	Most Played Australian Work	Won
2011	"Seventeen" – Nicholas Cester, Christopher Cester, Cameron Muncey	Rock Work of the Year	Won
2021	"Chase the Feeling" - Andrew Stockdale, Chris Cester, Jason Hill	Most Performed Rock Work	Nominated
