= Cameron Muncey =

Australian guitarist and vocalist

- Birth name: Cameron Thane Muncey
- Born: 8 February 1980 (age 45) Melbourne, Victoria, Australia
- Genres: Garage rock revival; hard rock; soft rock
- Occupations: Guitarist; vocalist
- Instrument(s): Guitar, vocals
- Years active: 2001–present
- Labels: Elektra

Cameron Thane Muncey (born 8 February 1980) is an Australian guitarist and vocalist. He is the mainstay lead guitarist and one of the songwriters of Melbourne-based rock band Jet which formed in 2001. Muncey co-wrote many of Jet's hits with Nic and Chris Cester, including "Are You Gonna Be My Girl", "Radio Song", "Put Your Money Where Your Mouth Is" and "Cold Hard Bitch".

== Biography ==
Muncey was born in Melbourne, and attended St Bedes College (high school) with future bandmates Nic and Chris Cester. Muncey took up guitar after hearing "Sunshine Of Your Love" by Cream. The song "Timothy" from "Get Born" was written about an older brother named Timothy who died in infancy before Muncey was born. Muncey and Nic Cester became best friends at school, with Cester declaring "He had 'Led Zeppelin' written on his bag, and so did I, so it was inevitable, I guess", on the band's documentary recorded on their DVD, Right! Right! Right!.

Muncey's trademark guitar for Get Born was a Gibson Flying V, and he has used it in concert and in many of the videos. He has since switched to Gibson Les Pauls and SGs. Since Shaka Rock, Muncey mainly plays a Gibson ES137. Muncey uses Marshall amps as seen in the "Are You Gonna Be My Girl" video, as well as Orange Amplification as seen in the "Take it or Leave it" video. In the video for "Are You Gonna Be My Girl" he can be seen wearing an AC/DC T-shirt.

In addition to playing lead guitar, Muncey sings lead vocals on a number of Jet's songs, including "Hey Kids", "Radio Song" and more recently "She Holds A Grudge".

Muncey married his girlfriend Sarah Rumbelow, on 18 August 2009.

=== APRA Awards ===
The APRA Awards are presented annually from 1982 by the Australasian Performing Right Association (APRA).

Year	Nominee / work	Award	Result
2006	"Are You Gonna Be My Girl" – Nicholas Cester, Cameron Muncey	Most Performed Australian Work Overseas	Won
2006	"Cold Hard Bitch" – Nicholas Cester, Christopher Cester, Cameron Muncey	Most Performed Australian Work Overseas	Nominated
2007	"Are You Gonna Be My Girl" – Nicholas Cester, Cameron Muncey	Most Performed Australian Work Overseas	Won
