= Nic Cester =

Australian singer-songwriter and guitarist

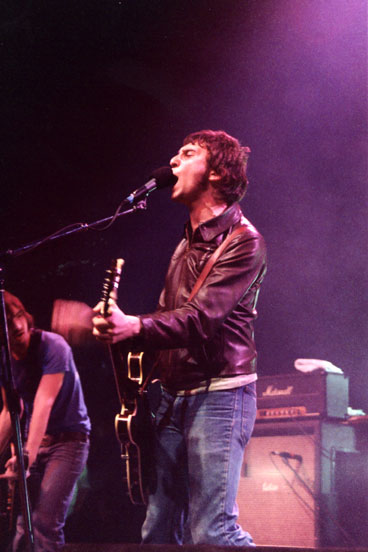
- Nic Cester on a concert with Jet.

Background information
- Born: Nicholas John Cester; 6 July 1979 (age 47); Melbourne, Victoria, Australia
- Genres: Garage rock revival; hard rock; soft rock
- Occupations: Musician; singer; songwriter; guitarist
- Instruments: Guitar; vocals; piano
- Years active: 2001–present
- Label: Elektra
- Member of: Jet; The Wrights; The Jaded Hearts Club
- Website: www.jetofficial.com

Nicholas John Cester (born 6 July 1979) is an Australian musician, singer, songwriter and guitarist, known for being the frontman and lead singer in rock band Jet alongside his younger brother Chris. Cester is also a founder of the Australian supergroup The Wrights. Jet's track "Are You Gonna Be My Girl", has won APRA Awards for 'Most Performed Australian Work Overseas' in 2006 and 2007.

== Biography ==
Nicholas John Cester was born on 6 July 1979 and grew up in Melbourne. He is the oldest of four brothers, born to a Scottish mother and an Australian father of Italian descent, John. His paternal grandparents immigrated from the provinces of Treviso and Pordenone. His uncle Eugene Cester (aka Eugene De La Hot Croix Bun), is a founder of satirical rock band TISM. Cester attended St Bedes Boys College in Mentone, Victoria, and sees The Beatles as his greatest musical influence.

Cester and Cameron Muncey formed a band in 1996 during secondary school. Cester decided to learn how to play guitar after watching his uncle play "Blackbird". Jet has a line-up of Cester (vocals, guitar), his brother Chris (drums, percussion, vocals), Muncey (lead guitar, vocals), and Mark Wilson (bass, piano, vocals). When Jet first began performing in clubs, Cester was working in a local factory as a forklift operator. Jet played multiple shows and residencies at The Duke of Windsor Hotel in Chapel Street, Windsor. Dave Powell of Majorbox Music saw them play one night and decided to manage the group. The band was signed to the Elektra record label after their debut single, "Take It Or Leave It", became a hit.

Cester is also a founder of the supergroup The Wrights. On 31 October 2007, Cester performed alongside Powderfinger and Missy Higgins in Concert for a Cure (for women with breast cancer). In February 2009, Cester performed at the 50th anniversary celebration of the founding of Melbourne's Myer Music Bowl with a cover version of Paul McCartney's "Maybe I'm Amazed". On 22 January 2010, he covered the AC/DC song "Back in Black" with British rock group Muse at the Big Day Out. On 8 June he sang it with Muse again at San Siro gig, in Milan.

Cester, with Davey Lane and Kram have provided a single, "Tomorrow", for the Australian feature film Tomorrow, When the War Began. Cester appears in Kram's "Silk Suits" music video as a tennis umpire alongside Australian Tennis Player Alicia Molik.

In November 2017, he released his first solo album Sugar Rush.

Since 2017, he is one of the lead vocalists of The Jaded Hearts Club. In 2020, he released two singles with them and on 2 October 2020, they released their album, You've Always Been Here.

== Personal life ==
Cester tours with Jet for most of the year, but when not travelling he shares his time between homes in Melbourne and Como, Italy.

== Instruments and equipment ==
=== Electric guitars ===
- Gibson ES-335
- Gibson SG
- Gretsch Duo-Jet.

=== Acoustic guitars ===
- Gibson SJ-200 Modern Classic
- Cole Clark FL-3

=== Amplifiers/Heads ===
- Hiwatt Amp Head
- Hiwatt Quad Box
- Marshall Quad Box
- Orange Amp Head
- Vox AC30 Heritage Head
- Vox V212 Heritage Cabinet

=== APRA Awards ===
The APRA Awards are presented annually from 1982 by the Australasian Performing Right Association (APRA).

Year	Nominee / work	Award	Result
2006	"Are You Gonna Be My Girl" – Nicholas Cester, Cameron Muncey	Most Performed Australian Work Overseas	Won
2006	"Cold Hard Bitch" – Nicholas Cester, Christopher Cester, Cameron Muncey	Most Performed Australian Work Overseas	Nominated
2006	"Look What You've Done" - Nicholas Cester	Most Performed Australian Work Overseas	Nominated
2007	"Are You Gonna Be My Girl" – Nicholas Cester, Cameron Muncey	Most Performed Australian Work Overseas	Won
2007	"Look What You've Done" – Nicholas Cester	Most Performed Australian Work Overseas	Nominated

== Charitable work ==
Cester is a supporter of The Fred Hollows Foundation, founded by eye surgeon Fred Hollows. In 2008, Cester's band Jet released a video clip paying tribute to Hollows.
