= Eskimo Joe discography =

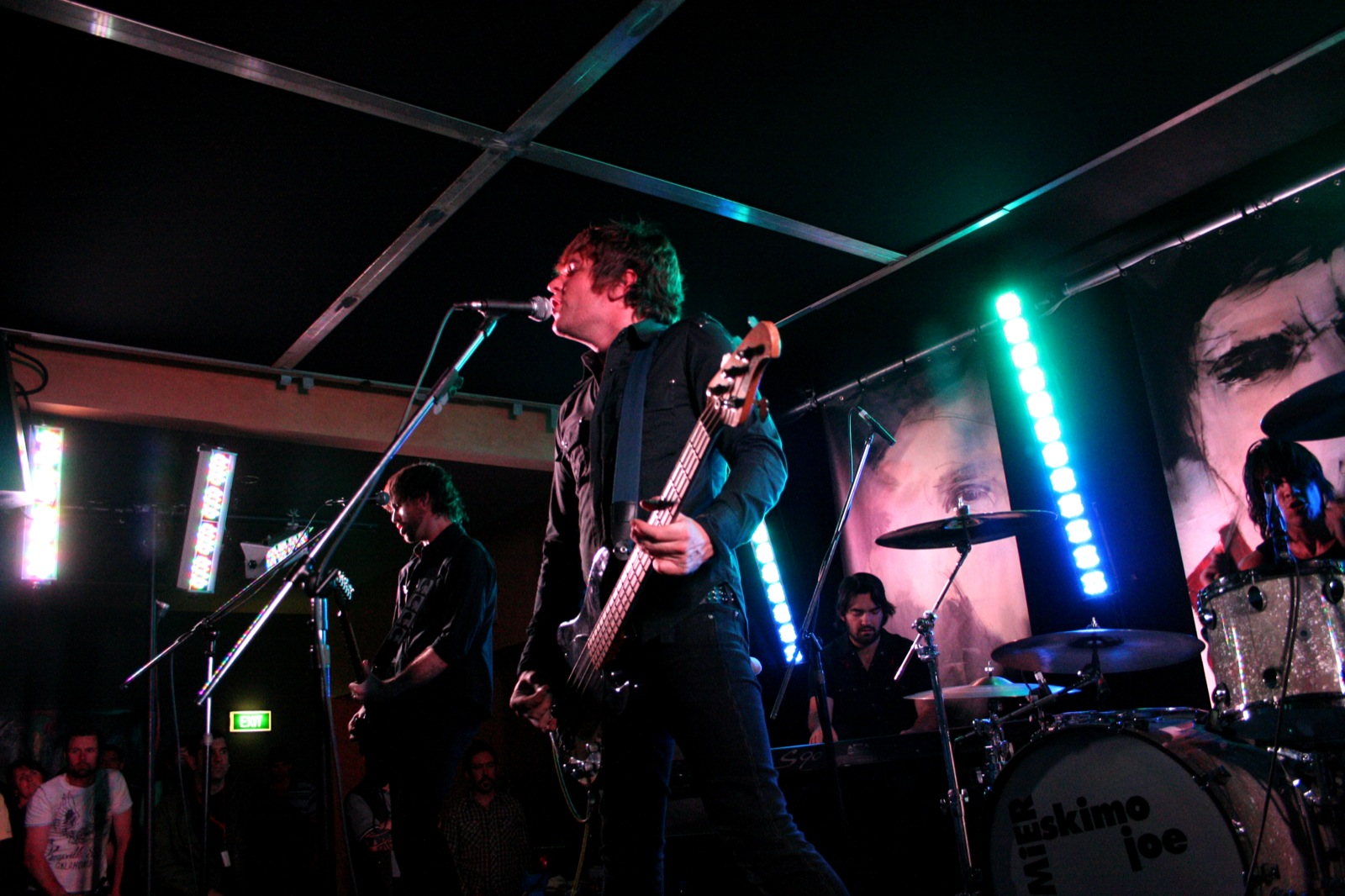
- Eskimo Joe perform in 2006 at the Peninsula Lounge, Victoria
- Studio albums: 6
- Extended plays: 4
- Live albums: 1
- Compilation albums: 1
- Singles: 23
- Video albums: 1

The discography of Eskimo Joe, an Australian rock band, consists of six studio albums, one live album, one compilation album, four extended plays, twenty-three singles and one video album.

== Albums ==
=== Studio albums ===
Title	Album details	Peak chart positions		Certifications (sales thresholds)
Title	Album details	AUS	NZ	Certifications (sales thresholds)
Girl	Released: 31 July 2001; Label: Modular (MODCD011); Format: CD	29	—	ARIA: Gold
A Song Is a City	Released: 16 May 2004; Label: Warner, Mushroom (337992); Format: CD	2	—	ARIA: 2× Platinum
Black Fingernails, Red Wine	Released: 10 June 2006; Label: Mushroom, Warner (5101128442); Format: CD, digital download	1	20	ARIA: 4× Platinum
Inshalla	Released: 29 May 2009; Label: Warner (5186540285); Format: CD, digital download	1	—	ARIA: Gold
Ghosts of the Past	Released: 12 August 2011; Label: Dirt Diamond, Warner (5249869322); Format: CD, digital download	3	—	
Wastelands	Released: 20 September 2013; Label: Dirt Diamond, Inertia (DDPEJ0001CDX); Format: CD, LP, digital download	12	—	
"—" denotes releases that did not chart or were not released in that territory.

=== Live albums ===
Title	Album details
Live at the Perth Concert Hall (with the West Australian Symphony Orchestra)	Released: 30 August 2019; Label: Warner Music Australia (5419705618); Format: CD, digital download, streaming

=== Compilation albums ===
Title	Album details	Peak chart positions
Title	Album details	AUS
The World Repeats Itself Somehow	Released: 10 December 2021; Label: Warner Music Australia; Format: CD, digital download, streaming, LP	— (Note: The World Repeats Itself Somehow did not enter the ARIA top 100, but peaked at number 17 on the ARIA Australian Artist Albums chart.)

=== Video albums ===
Title	Album details	Certifications
Eskimo Joe	Released: 29 August 2005; Label: Mushroom, Warner; Format: DVD	ARIA: Gold

== Extended plays ==
Title	EP details	Peak chart positions
Title	EP details	AUS
Sweater	Released: April 1998; Label: Troy Horse (TH021); Format: CD	90
Eskimo Joe	Released: 8 July 1999; Label: Modular (MODEP001); Format: CD	94
Beating like a Drum	Released: 4 August 2007; Label: Mushroom, Warner (5144213082); Format: CD	—
"—" denotes releases that did not chart.

== Singles ==
Year	Title	Peak chart positions			Certifications	Album
Year	Title	AUS	Hottest 100^{[JJJ]}	NZ	Certifications	Album
1998	"Sweater"	— (Note: "Sweater" was released as a radio-only single, and was ineligible to chart.)	33	—		Sweater
1999	"Turn Up Your Stereo"	— (Note: "Turn Up Your Stereo" was released as a radio-only single, and was ineligible to chart.)	39	—		Eskimo Joe
1999	"Ruby Wednesday"	— (Note: "Ruby Wednesday" was released as a radio-only single, and was ineligible to chart.)	99	—		Eskimo Joe
2001	"Wake Up"	—	25	—		Girl
2001	"Who Sold Her Out"	—	34	—		Girl
2001	"Planet Earth"	—	31	—		Girl
2002	"Who Sold Her Out" / "Liar"	94	—	—		Girl
2004	"From the Sea"	33	3	32		A Song Is a City
2004	"Smoke"	— (Note: "Smoke" was released as a radio-only single, and was ineligible to chart.)	62	—		A Song Is a City
2004	"Older Than You"	46	32	—		A Song Is a City
2006	"Black Fingernails, Red Wine"	6	2	13	ARIA: Platinum	Black Fingernails, Red Wine
2006	"Sarah"	12	—	—		Black Fingernails, Red Wine
2007	"New York"	26	95	—		Black Fingernails, Red Wine
2007	"Breaking Up"	83	—	—		Black Fingernails, Red Wine
2007	"London Bombs"	—	—	—		Black Fingernails, Red Wine
2009	"Foreign Land"	13	65	—	ARIA: Gold	Inshalla
2009	"Losing Friends Over Love"	—	—	—		Inshalla
2009	"Don't Let Me Down"	50	—	—		Inshalla
2011	"When We Were Kids"	—	—	—		Ghosts of the Past
2011	"Love Is a Drug"	38	—	—		Ghosts of the Past
2011	"Echo"	—	—	—		Ghosts of the Past
2012	"Speeding Car"	—	—	—		Ghosts of the Past
2013	"Got What You Need"	—	—	—		Wastelands
2020	"Say Something"	—	—	—		The World Repeats Itself Somehow
2021	"99 Ways"	—	—	—		Non-album singles
2024	"The First Time"	—	—	—		Non-album singles
2025	"Miracle Cure"	—	—	—		Non-album singles
"—" denotes releases that did not chart or were not released in that territory.

Notes

- JJJ References for the Triple J Hottest 100: 1998, 1999, 2001, 2003, 2004, 2006.

== Other appearances ==
Year	Song contributed	Album	Notes
2007	"Mind Games"	Instant Karma	John Lennon cover
2009	"Thunderclap"	New Moon soundtrack	Bonus track

== Music videos ==
Year	Title	Director	Producer
1998	"14Hz"		
1999	"Ruby Wednesday"	Damien Watkins	Druid Films
1999	"Turn Up Your Stereo	Robert Pygott	Bard Films
2001	"Wake Up"	Ben Saunders	Nice Trees
2001	"Who Sold Her Out"	Glendyn Ivin	Exit Films
2001	"Planet Earth"	Ben Saunders	Nice Trees
2001	"Liar"	Nash Edgerton	Cherub Pictures
2004	"From the Sea"	Paul Butler & Scott Walton	Fifty Fifty Films
2004	"Smoke"	Jesse Warn	Method Films
2004	"Older Than You"	Nash Edgerton	Cherub Pictures
2004	"Life Is Better with You"	Anton Monstead & Jason Lamont	Black Milk
2006	"Black Fingernails, Red Wine"	Nash Edgerton	Cherub Pictures
2006	"Black Fingernails, Red Wine" (Revised version)	Bart Borghesi	Pirate Films
2006	"Sarah"	Bart Borghesi	Pirate Films
2006	"New York"	Bart Borghesi	Pirate Films
2007	"Breaking Up"	Susan Slitt	Ticket to Ride
2007	"London Bombs"	Helen Clemens	Ticket to Ride
2009	"Foreign Land"	Tony Davison	Cyclops Films
2009	"Losing Friends Over Love"	Helen Clemens	Jamie Hilton (Ticket to Ride)
2009	"Don't Let Me Down"	Damien Escott & Stephen Lance	Head Pictures
2011	"When We Were Kids"		
2011	"Love Is a Drug"	Bart Borghesi	Pirate Films
2013	"Got What You Need"	Dominic Pearce	Lauren Cleary
2021	"99 Ways"		
2024	"The First Time"		
