= The World Repeats Itself Somehow =

Greatest hits album by Eskimo Joe
- Released: 10 December 2021
- Recorded: 1997–2020
- Length: 45:18
- Label: Warner Music Australia

Eskimo Joe chronology
| Live at the Perth Concert Hall (2019) | The World Repeats Itself Somehow (2021) |

The World Repeats Itself Somehow (subtitled The Best of Eskimo Joe) is the first greatest hits album by Australian alternative rock band Eskimo Joe. The album was released on 10 December 2021.

Upon its announcement on 27 September 2021, frontman Kavyen Temperley said: "It's surreal listening back to what is now a twenty plus year career. From writing songs like 'Sweater' in a smelly old jam room, to songs like 'Say Something' which was written more recently after some time off, I'm incredibly proud of what we've created together musically, as well as the friendship we've managed to maintain with each other after so many years." The album features songs from five of the band's six albums.

== Track listing ==
The World Repeats Itself Somehow track listing
| No. | Title | Writer(s) | Album | Length |
|---|---|---|---|---|
| 1. | "Sweater" | Stuart MacLeod; Joel Quartermain; Kavyen Temperley | Sweater | 2:16 |
| 2. | "Who Sold Her Out" | MacLeod; Quartermain; Temperley | Girl | 3:10 |
| 3. | "Planet Earth" | MacLeod; Quartermain; Temperley | Girl | 3:21 |
| 4. | "Wake Up" | MacLeod; Quartermain; Temperley | Girl | 3:30 |
| 5. | "From the Sea" | MacLeod; Quartermain; Temperley | A Song Is a City | 3:20 |
| 6. | "Older Than You" | MacLeod; Quartermain; Temperley | A Song Is a City | 2:29 |
| 7. | "Sarah" | MacLeod; Quartermain; Temperley | Black Fingernails, Red Wine | 3:31 |
| 8. | "Black Fingernails, Red Wine" | MacLeod; Quartermain; Temperley | Black Fingernails, Red Wine | 4:09 |
| 9. | "New York" | MacLeod; Quartermain; Temperley | Black Fingernails, Red Wine | 3:52 |
| 10. | "Foreign Land" | MacLeod; Quartermain; Temperley; Steve Parkin | Inshalla | 4:32 |
| 11. | "Don't Let Me Down" | MacLeod; Quartermain; Temperley; Parkin | Inshalla | 3:36 |
| 12. | "Love Is a Drug" | MacLeod; Quartermain; Temperley | Ghosts of the Past | 3:44 |
| 13. | "Say Something" | | new recording | 3:48 |
| Total length: | | | | 45:18 |

== Charts ==
| Chart (2021) | Peak position |
|---|---|
| Australian Artist Albums (ARIA) | 17 |

== Release history ==
Release history and formats for The World Repeats Itself Somehow
| Region | Date | Format | Label | Catalogue |
|---|---|---|---|---|
| Various | 10 December 2021 | CD; streaming; digital download | Warner Music Australia | 5419711274 |
| Australia | 10 December 2021 | LP | Warner Music Australia | 5419710862 |
