= Life Is Better with You =

Single by Eskimo Joe

Single by Eskimo Joe

from the album A Song Is a City
- Released: December 2004
- Recorded: Milkbar Studios and Big Jesus Burger Studios; August - September 2003
- Genre: Rock
- Length: 4:43
- Label: Festival Mushroom, Warner
- Songwriters: Stuart MacLeod; Joel Quartermain; Kavyen Temperley
- Producers: Paul McKercher & Eskimo Joe

Eskimo Joe singles chronology
"Older Than You" (2004)	"Life Is Better with You" (2004)	"Black Fingernails, Red Wine" (2006)

"Life Is Better with You" is the fourth single by Eskimo Joe, taken from their second studio album A Song Is a City. It was released in December 2004.

Temperley talks about the song coming from “sitting around with my friends taking stock of what had happened the night before, and then it was kind of an appreciation of my friends, because for four or five years I’d been on the road, I worked really, really hard every time I came home to keep those connections with my good friends in Fremantle and I think anyone who works in a band will tell you they draw a lot of strength from that, coming back and having your mates and being able to reconnect in that really normal way.”

The single was originally intended to be the second single.

It just really fits the vibe of the album. When we wrote it, we felt it could be a song that the album is based around. We knew it was a single.

— Kav Temperley

Clayton Bolger of Allmusic describes it as being one of the album's highlights with an uplifting chorus complete with makeshift choir although he feels that the verses owe much to Neil Young's "Down by the River".

Two versions of the music video were released and both were included on the band's 2005 video album, Eskimo Joe. The videos were directed by Anton Monsted, who had worked extensively with Australian film director Baz Luhrmann, and Jason Lamont of Black Milk productions.

The song was included on the soundtrack to the critically acclaimed Australian television drama series Love My Way.

== Track listing ==
All tracks are written by Eskimo Joe.

CD single
No.	Title	Length
1.	"Life Is Better with You"	3:50

== Release history ==
Region	Date	Label	Format	Catalogue
Australia	2004	Festival Mushroom	CD (promotional release)	ESKIMO4
