= Smoke (Eskimo Joe song) =

Single by Eskimo Joe

from the album A Song Is a City
- Released: June 2004
- Recorded: Milkbar Studios and Big Jesus Burger Studios, Aug–Sep, 2003
- Genre: Alternative rock
- Length: 3:40
- Label: Festival Mushroom, Warner
- Songwriter(s): Stuart MacLeod; Joel Quartermain; Kavyen Temperley
- Producer(s): Paul McKercher & Eskimo Joe

Eskimo Joe singles chronology
"From the Sea" (2004)	"Smoke" (2004)	"Older Than You" (2004)

"Smoke" is a song by Australian rock band Eskimo Joe. It was released in June 2004 as the second single from their second studio album, A Song Is a City.

It reached number 62 on Triple J's Hottest 100 for 2004.

== Track listing ==
All tracks are written by Eskimo Joe

CD single
No.	Title	Length
1.	"Smoke"	3:40

== Release history ==
Region	Date	Label	Format	Catalogue
Australia	June 2004	Festival Mushroom	CD (promotional release)	FMR SMOKE 1
