= Liar (Eskimo Joe song) =

Single by Eskimo Joe

from the album Girl
- Released: 4 March 2002
- Recorded: August–November 2000
- Genre: Rock
- Length: 3:26
- Label: Modular
- Songwriter(s): Stuart MacLeod; Joel Quartermain; Kavyen Temperley
- Producer(s): Ed Buller, Eskimo Joe

Eskimo Joe singles chronology
"Planet Earth" (2001)	"Liar" (2002)	"From the Sea" (2004)

"Liar" is a song by Australian band, Eskimo Joe, released in March 2002 as the fourth and final single from their debut album Girl as a double A side, with the re-released single, "Who Sold Her Out". The single peaked at number 94 on the ARIA charts.

The video for the "Liar" was directed by Nash Edgerton, and was nominated for Best Video at the ARIA Music Awards of 2002.

== Track listing ==
All tracks are written by Eskimo Joe

CD single
No.	Title	Length
1.	"Who Sold Her Out"	3:13
2.	"Liar"	3:25
3.	"Old and New"	2:51

== Charts ==
Chart (2002)	Peak position
ARIA Albums Chart	94

== Release history ==
Region	Date	Label	Format	Catalogue
Australia	March 2002	Modular	CD	MODCDS014
