= Stuart Leach =

Australian musician

Stuart Leach is a musician from Western Australia.

Stuart Leach was originally the drummer in Carpet, a funk band formed by Leach's brother Simon (guitar) and fellow year-12 Hollywood Senior High School student, Joel Quartermain (guitar), in Perth, Western Australia. Simon Leach inviting a friend, Kavyen Temperley (bass, vocals), who he shared a rental house with, to join them. With Temperley on board, the band changed its name to Freud's Pillow, performing around Perth and Fremantle between 1995 and 1998. The band managed to release only one EP, Pleasure Puppy in August 1997, featuring a collection of songs Temperley had written as a teenager, one of the songs on the EP, "Mr Hoek", was written by Temperley’s friend Stuart MacLeod.

The band disbanded in 1997 when Temperley and Quartermain together with MacLeod, won the National Campus Band's Competition as Eskimo Joe. Stuart and brother Simon went on to form The Mission Blue with Jodie Tesoriero (National Campus Band finalists in 1998), releasing an EP Project One in 2000. The Leach brothers formed One Horse Town, with Spank vocalist Sasha Ion in 2002, and Kathy Potter. The band finalised on a three piece outfit with Ronan Charles from Seahorse Radio on Rhodes piano, and Ion on vocals and guitar. Simon Leach went on to join Little Birdy in 2002. The band released a self-titled EP in October, 2004 and an album Six Feet of Snow in 2006. The band disbanded in March 2007 when Ion relocated to Melbourne. Leach then joined The Bank Holidays, where he replaced the band's former drummer, Stafford Chater later in 2007.
