= Generic City =

2000 EP by Regurgitator

EP by Regurgitator
- Released: September 2000
- Length: East West, Warner
- Producer: Magoo

Regurgitator chronology
Crush the Losers (2000)	Generic City (2000)	Eduardo and Rodriguez Wage War on T-Wrecks (2001)

Generic City is an extended play by Australian rock band Regurgitator, credited as Regurgitator meets Pnau, Friendly & Sugiurumn and released on a limited edition 12" Vinyl EP in September 2000. The EP features the remixed versions of three songs from the group's third studio album, ...art.

== Track listing ==
Side A
No.	Title	Writer(s)	Length
1.	"Are U Being Served" (remix by Quan Yeomans)	Quan Yeomans	4:40
2.	"Are U Being Served" (remix by Pnau)	Yeomans	6:40

Side B
No.	Title	Writer(s)	Length
1.	"I Like Repetitive Music" (remix by Friendly)	Yeomans	3:50
2.	"Freshmint!" (remix by Suguirumn)	Yeomans	5:31

== Release history ==
Region	Date	Format(s)	Label	Catalogue
Australia	September 2000	12" Vinyl EP	East West/Warner	8573844060
