= Wastelands (album) =

Studio album by Eskimo Joe
- Released: 20 September 2013
- Genre: Alternative rock; synthpop
- Length: 42:37
- Label: Dirt Diamonds; Inertia
- Producer: Burke Reid

Eskimo Joe chronology
Ghosts of the Past (2011)	Wastelands (2013)

Singles from Wastelands
- 1. "Got What You Need" Released: 19 August 2013

Wastelands is the sixth studio album by Australian rock band Eskimo Joe, released on 20 September 2013.

== Track listing ==
All tracks are written by Eskimo Joe (Kavyen Temperley, Stuart MacLeod, Joel Quartermain)
except 2, 3, 6 and 10, written and composed by Eskimo Joe and Steve Parkin

No.	Title	Length
1.	"Running Out of Needs"	3:57
2.	"Not Alone"	4:02
3.	"Got What You Need"	4:46
4.	"Sad Song"	3:21
5.	"Every Harmony"	4:23
6.	"Disgrace"	3:51
7.	"What You Want"	4:05
8.	"How Was I to Know"	4:15
9.	"Keep It Coming"	4:23
10.	"Last Beacon Light"	5:34
Total length:		42:37

== Personnel ==
- Kavyen Temperley – vocals, bass, keyboards
- Stuart MacLeod – guitar, vocals
- Joel Quartermain – guitar, drums, vocals

== Charts ==
Chart (2013)	Peak position
Australian Albums (ARIA)	12

== Release history ==
Region	Date	Label	Format	Catalogue
Australia	20 September 2013	Dirt Diamonds, Inertia	CD digipak	DDPEJ001CDX
Australia	20 September 2013	Dirt Diamonds, Inertia	CD 'Special Supporters Edition' (Pozible campaign exclusive slipcase over DDPEJ001CDX)	DDPEJ001FAN
