= Sweater (disambiguation) =

A sweater is a knitted or crocheted garment covering the upper part of the body.

Sweater or sweaters may also refer to:

- Sweater (EP), a 1998 EP by Eskimo Joe
- "Undone – The Sweater Song", a 1994 song by Weezer
- "Sweater", a 2020 single by Black Midi
- "Sweaters", a song by Laurie Anderson from her 1982 album Big Science (Laurie Anderson album)
- Sweater (film), a 2019 film directed by Shieladitya Moulik
- The Sweater, a 1980 short film adapted from Roch Carrier's short story "The Hockey Sweater"
- "The Sweaters" (The Amazing World of Gumball), a television episode
