= Crush the Losers =

2000 EP by Regurgitator

EP by Regurgitator
- Released: September 2000
- Label: East West, Warner
- Producer: Magoo

Regurgitator chronology
...art (1999)	Crush the Losers (2000)	Generic City (2000)

Regurgitator singles chronology
"Freshmint!" (2000)	"Crush the Losers" (2000)	"Are You Being Served" (2001)

Crush the Losers (subtitled Unofficial Theme Song of the Games) is the third extended play by Australian rock band Regurgitator. Crush the Losers was released in September 2000, to coincide with the 2000 Summer Olympics, and peaked at number 64 on the ARIA singles chart.

The EP was supported with a radio promo and video clip of the title track; which poled at number 48 on the Triple J Hottest 100, 2000.

== Track listing ==
1. "Crush the Losers" (Quan Yeomans) – 3:50
2. "Injury" (Ben Ely) – 2:30
3. "Time in the Wilderness" (Shane Rudken) – 5:26
4. "Physio" (Yeomans) – 3:26
5. "Comeback (Eye of the Tiger)" (Survivor) – 3:23
6. "Return of the Loser" (Closing Ceremony After Party Mix) (Yeomans) – 4:20

== Charts ==
Chart (2000)	Peak position
Australia (ARIA) Singles Chart	64

== Release history ==
Region	Date	Format(s)	Label	Catalogue
Australia	September 2000	CD	East West/Warner	8573839352
