= Triple J's Hottest 100 of 2004 =

2005 compilation album of 2004 songs by Triple J

2004 Triple J Hottest 100
- Album artwork for the CD compilation

Countdown details
- Date of countdown: 26 January 2005

Countdown highlights
- Winning song: Franz Ferdinand "Take Me Out"
- Most entries: John Butler Trio; Scissor Sisters (4 tracks)

Chronology
← Previous; 2003	Next → 2005

The 2004 Triple J Hottest 100 was announced on 26 January 2005. It was the twelfth such countdown of the most popular songs of the year, according to listeners of the Australian radio station Triple J.

Voters were limited to 20 votes each: 10 via SMS (charged at 30c each) and 10 via the Internet (no charge).

Triple J presenter Craig Reucassel encouraged voters to vote for the Media Watch theme music on the condition that his counterpart Chris Taylor would do a nude run through the Big Day Out if it made the Hottest 100. While announcing the count, Reucassel called number 7 for the Media Watch theme, initiating Taylor on a streak through the music festival. Upon Taylor's return, Reucassel explained that Media Watch was ineligible due to not being recorded in 2004 and announced the real number 7. Missy Higgins was also in the studio and Reucassel goaded her into accepting a similar challenge should she win the Hottest 100.

From early in the countdown, it became obvious that Franz Ferdinand's "Take Me Out" would be the clear winner of the Hottest 100. Throughout the countdown, numerous references were made to this well-established fact, including announcers sarcastically claiming "Ha-ha! You thought they'd be #1" when "The Dark of the Matinée" was played at #50 as well a mock promotional piece heard in between in which votes for other bands such as Placebo and Jet were ignored in favour of Franz Ferdinand. When "Take Me Out" was officially announced as #1, it was reported that it had received more than double the votes of any other song. As with receiving more than double the votes, the presenters felt it sensible to also play a live version of "Take Me Out" directly after the studio version played at #1.

There were a record 475,000 voters that participated in the poll.

As in previous years, a CD featuring 40 (not necessarily the top 40) songs was released. A DVD, containing film clips of songs from the Hottest 100 was also released. A countdown of the videos of each song was shown on the ABC music series Rage in March.

== Full list ==
Note: Australian artists

#	Song	Artist	Country of origin
1	Take Me Out	Franz Ferdinand	United Kingdom
2	Scar	Missy Higgins	Australia
3	From the Sea	Eskimo Joe	Australia
4	Somebody Told Me	The Killers	United States
5	Black Betty	Spiderbait	Australia
6	Ten Days	Missy Higgins	Australia
7	Something's Gotta Give	John Butler Trio	Australia
8	Beautiful to Me	Little Birdy	Australia
9	Bless My Soul	Powderfinger	Australia
10	Jolene (Live)	The White Stripes	United States
11	Float On	Modest Mouse	United States
12	Coin-Operated Boy	The Dresden Dolls	United States
13	Mr. Brightside	The Killers	United States
14	It's Too Late	Evermore	New Zealand
15	Gamble Everything for Love	Ben Lee	Australia
16	Hard Act to Follow	Grinspoon	Australia
17	Yo Mama	Butterfingers	Australia
18	Fit but You Know It	The Streets	United Kingdom
19	Dry Your Eyes	The Streets	United Kingdom
20	Fucken Awesome	Spiderbait	Australia
21	Common People	William Shatner	Canada
22	American Idiot	Green Day	United States
23	Take Your Mama	Scissor Sisters	United States
24	Look What You've Done	Jet	Australia
25	Treat Yo Mama	John Butler Trio	Australia
26	Better Off Alone	Grinspoon	Australia
27	Don't U Eva	Sarah Blasko	Australia
28	Ch-Check It Out	Beastie Boys	United States
29	This Fire	Franz Ferdinand	United Kingdom
30	Girl Anachronism	The Dresden Dolls	United States
31	The Bucket	Kings of Leon	United States
32	Older Than You	Eskimo Joe	Australia
33	Chicken Payback	The Bees	United Kingdom
34	What the Fuck	Machine Gun Fellatio	Australia
35	Not Many – The Remix!	Scribe featuring Savage and Con Psy	New Zealand
36	Forget Her	Jeff Buckley	United States
37	Adelaide	Ben Folds	United States
38	Vertigo	U2	Ireland
39	Smile Like You Mean It	The Killers	United States
40	This Is a Love Song	Little Birdy	Australia
41	Mass Destruction	Faithless	United Kingdom
42	This Old Love	Lior	Australia
43	Godhopping	Dogs Die in Hot Cars	United Kingdom
44	Take Me Out	Scissor Sisters	United States
45	Woman	Wolfmother	Australia
46	Amerika	Rammstein	Germany
47	I Can't Give You What I Haven't Got	The Living End	Australia
48	Memory Lane	Elliott Smith	United States
49	Casualty	Missy Higgins	Australia
50	The Dark of the Matinée	Franz Ferdinand	United Kingdom
51	What You Want	John Butler Trio	Australia
52	My Friend Robot	Regurgitator	Australia
53	English Summer Rain	Placebo	United Kingdom
54	Bridal Train	The Waifs	Australia
55	Walk Idiot Walk	The Hives	Sweden
56	Shelter	Xavier Rudd	Australia
57	For One Day	Evermore	New Zealand
58	Laura	Scissor Sisters	United States
59	Solace	Xavier Rudd	Australia
60	L-A-C-H-L-A-N	Your Wedding Night	Australia
61	Flashdance	Deep Dish	United States
62	Smoke	Eskimo Joe	Australia
63	She Wants to Move	N.E.R.D	United States
64	Self Destruct in 5	Epicure	Australia
65	Galvanize	The Chemical Brothers	United Kingdom
66	Little Yellow Spider	Devendra Banhart	United States
67	10 A.M. Automatic	The Black Keys	United States
68	Process This	Powderfinger	Australia
69	Push Up	Freestylers	United Kingdom
70	Four to the Floor (Thin White Duke Remix)	Starsailor	United Kingdom
71	C'mon C'mon	The Von Bondies	United States
72	Section 12 (Hold Me Now)	The Polyphonic Spree	United States
73	Sleepy Little Deathtoll Town	The Panda Band	Australia
74	Slow Hands	Interpol	United States
75	Paco Doesn't Love Me	Spazzys	Australia
76	Evil	Interpol	United States
77	Run	Snow Patrol	United Kingdom
78	Tonight's the Night	Little Birdy	Australia
79	Dirty Hearts	Dallas Crane	Australia
80	Young Man, Old Man (You Ain't Better Than the Rest)	The Dissociatives	Australia
81	Rough Diamonds	End of Fashion	Australia
82	Drop the Pressure	Mylo	United Kingdom
83	Numb All Over	Dallas Crane	Australia
84	I Love You 'Cause I Have To	Dogs Die in Hot Cars	United Kingdom
85	The Drop	Regurgitator	Australia
86	I Was Born (A Unicorn)	The Unicorns	Canada
87	Breathe Me	Sia	Australia
88	Imagine	A Perfect Circle	United States
89	Get What You Need	Jet	Australia
90	Lotion	Greenskeepers	United States
91	Somersault	Decoder Ring	Australia
92	Comfortably Numb	Scissor Sisters	United States
93	Hello	John Butler Trio	Australia
94	Ride	The Vines	Australia
95	Twenty Years	Placebo	United Kingdom
96	Mirror Mirror	After the Fall	Australia
97	Safe Forever	Gyroscope	Australia
98	Catch Me Up	Gomez	United Kingdom
99	Always	The Butterfly Effect	Australia
100	I'm Gonna Haunt You	Fabienne Delsol	France

== Statistics ==
=== Artists with multiple entries ===
#	Artist	Entries
4	John Butler Trio	7, 25, 51, 93
4	Scissor Sisters	23, 44, 58, 92
3	Franz Ferdinand	1, 29, 50
3	Missy Higgins	2, 6, 49
3	Eskimo Joe	3, 32, 62
3	The Killers	4, 13, 39
3	Little Birdy	8, 40, 78
2	Spiderbait	5, 20
2	Powderfinger	9, 68
2	The Dresden Dolls	12, 30
2	Evermore	14, 57
2	Grinspoon	16, 26
2	The Streets	18, 19
2	Jet	24, 89
2	Dogs Die in Hot Cars	43, 84
2	Regurgitator	52, 85
2	Placebo	53, 95
2	Xavier Rudd	56, 59
2	Interpol	74, 76
2	Dallas Crane	79, 83

=== Countries represented ===
Country	Entries
Australia	47
United States	28
United Kingdom	17
New Zealand	3
Canada	1
Ireland	1
Germany	1
Sweden	1
France	1

=== Records ===
- U2's "Vertigo" placed at No. 38, despite having not been played on Triple J.
- Two versions of "Take Me Out" appeared in the countdown, the original by Franz Ferdinand at No. 1 and the Scissor Sisters' cover at No. 44; this is the first time it has happened since 1997.
  - With their covers of "Take Me Out" and "Comfortably Numb", the Scissor Sisters are the first band to have multiple covers feature in the same countdown.
- The Living End made their eighth consecutive appearance in the Hottest 100, having featured in every annual countdown since 1997. Similarly, Machine Gun Fellatio made their sixth consecutive appearance, having appeared in every annual countdown since 1999.
- At No. 5, Spiderbait's cover of "Black Betty" ties with Björk's cover of "It's Oh So Quiet" as the highest ranked cover song in a Hottest 100.

== Top 10 Albums of 2004 ==
Bold indicates winner of the Hottest 100.

#	Artist	Album	Country of origin	Tracks in the Hottest 100
1	**Franz Ferdinand**	**Franz Ferdinand**	**United Kingdom**	**1, 29, 50**
2	John Butler Trio	Sunrise Over Sea	Australia	25, 51, 93 (8 in 2003)
3	Missy Higgins	The Sound of White	Australia	2, 6, 49 (31, 74 in 2005)
4	Eskimo Joe	A Song Is a City	Australia	3, 32, 62
5	Little Birdy	BigBigLove	Australia	8, 40, 78 (16, 25 in 2003)
6	The Killers	Hot Fuss	United States	4, 13, 39
7	Grinspoon	Thrills, Kills & Sunday Pills	Australia	16, 26
8	Xavier Rudd	Solace	Australia	56, 59 (54 in 2003)
9	Modest Mouse	Good News for People Who Love Bad News	United States	11
10	The Streets	A Grand Don't Come for Free	United Kingdom	18, 19

== CD release ==
The 2-CD set titled triple j – Hottest 100: Vol 12 Various Artists was released 6 March 2005. It is a compilation of 40 of the top 100 songs.

**CD 1**
1. Franz Ferdinand – Take Me Out
2. The Killers – Somebody Told Me
3. Spiderbait – Black Betty
4. Kings of Leon – The Bucket
5. Jet – Look What You've Done
6. Little Birdy – Beautiful To Me
7. Ben Folds – Adelaide
8. Devendra Banhart – Little Yellow Spider
9. Eskimo Joe – From The Sea
10. The Streets – Fit But You Know It
11. Modest Mouse – Float On
12. Decoder Ring – Somersault
13. John Butler Trio – Somethings Gotta Give
14. The Bees – Chicken Payback
15. The Dresden Dolls – Coin-Operated Boy
16. Dallas Crane – Dirty Hearts
17. Ben Lee – Gamble Everything For Love
18. Greenskeepers – Lotion
19. N.E.R.D – She Wants To Move
20. Grinspoon – Hard Act To Follow
**CD 2**
1. Missy Higgins – Scar
2. Mylo – Drop The Pressure
3. The Von Bondies – C’mon C’mon
4. The Hives – Walk Idiot Walk
5. Sarah Blasko – Don't U Eva
6. Faithless – Mass Destruction
7. William Shatner – Common People
8. Wolfmother – Woman
9. The Black Keys – 10 A.M. Automatic
10. Dogs Die in Hot Cars – Godhopping
11. Scribe – Not Many – The Remix!
12. Butterfingers – Yo Mama
13. Spazzys – Paco Doesn't Love Me
14. Interpol – Slow Hands
15. Lior – This Old Love
16. Evermore – It's Too Late
17. The Panda Band – Sleepy Little Deathtoll Town
18. Freestylers – Push Up
19. Regurgitator – My Friend Robot
20. Elliott Smith – Memory Lane

== See also ==
- 2004 in music
