= Planet Earth (Eskimo Joe song) =

2001 single by Eskimo Joe

Single by Eskimo Joe

from the album Girl
- Released: 5 November 2001
- Recorded: August – November 2000
- Genre: Rock
- Length: 3:20
- Label: Modular
- Songwriter(s): Stuart MacLeod; Joel Quartermain; Kavyen Temperley
- Producer(s): Ed Buller & Eskimo Joe

Eskimo Joe singles chronology
"Who Sold Her Out" (2001)	"Planet Earth" (2001)	"Liar" (2002)

"Planet Earth" is a song by Australian rock band, Eskimo Joe. It was released in November 2001 as the third single from their debut studio album, Girl.

"Planet Earth" peaked at No. 41 on the Western Australian singles chart and No.31 on Triple J's Hottest 100 for 2001.

== Track listing ==
All tracks are written by Eskimo Joe

CD single
No.	Title	Length
1.	"Planet Earth"	3:23
2.	"Planet Earth" (Live Acoustic Version)	3:17
3.	"Who Sold Her Out" (Live Acoustic Version)	3:11
4.	"Who Sold Her Out" (Album Version)	3:18

== Release history ==
Region	Date	Label	Format	Catalogue
Australia	5 November 2001	Modular	CD	MODCDS010
