= From the Sea =

2004 single by Eskimo Joe

Single by Eskimo Joe

from the album A Song Is a City
- B-side: "This Room" (acoustic); "See Saw"; "Commitment Bells"
- Released: 22 March 2004
- Studio: Milkbar; Big Jesus Burger
- Length: 3:25
- Label: Festival Mushroom
- Songwriters: Stuart MacLeod; Joel Quartermain; Kavyen Temperley
- Producers: Paul McKercher; Eskimo Joe

Eskimo Joe singles chronology
"Liar" (2002)	"From the Sea" (2004)	"Smoke" (2004)

"From the Sea" is a song by Australian rock band Eskimo Joe, released on 22 March 2004 as the lead single from their second studio album, A Song Is a City (2004). It was their most successful single at that time, reaching number 33 on the Australian ARIA Singles Chart. At the ARIA Music Awards of 2004, the song was nominated for Single of the Year, and it was also ranked number three on Triple J's 2004 Hottest 100.

== Track listing ==
All tracks are written by Eskimo Joe.

Australian CD single
No.	Title	Length
1.	"From the Sea"	3:22
2.	"This Room" (acoustic version)	3:29
3.	"See Saw"	3:11
4.	"Commitment Bells"	4:29

== Charts ==
Chart (2004)	Peak position
Australia (ARIA)	33
New Zealand (Recorded Music NZ)	32

== Release history ==
Region	Date	Label	Format	Catalogue	Ref.
Australia	22 March 2004	Festival Mushroom	CD	021702	
