= Triple J's Hottest 100 of 2001 =

Australian song chart in 2001

2001 Triple J Hottest 100
- Album artwork for the CD compilation

Countdown details
- Date of countdown: January 2002

Countdown highlights
- Winning song: Alex Lloyd "Amazing"
- Most entries: Something for Kate; The Strokes; Thom Yorke; Eskimo Joe; Muse (3 tracks)

Chronology
← Previous; 2000	Next → 2002

The 2001 Triple J Hottest 100, announced in January 2002, was the ninth such countdown of the most popular songs of the year, according to listeners of the Australian radio station Triple J. As in previous years, a CD was released, this time featuring 34 songs (although not the top 34 songs as they were ranked).

When the announcers for the final stretch of the countdown—Adam Spencer and Wil Anderson—got to the number-one track, they first played their own parody track "Matt Hayden", named after the Australian cricketer and set to the tune of "Ms. Jackson" by OutKast. "Ms. Jackson" actually reached the Hottest 100 the next year in 2002 when a cover by The Vines took it to number 30.

== Full list ==
Note: Australian artists

#	Song	Artist	Country of origin
1	Amazing	Alex Lloyd	Australia
2	Monsters	Something for Kate	Australia
3	Chop Suey!	System of a Down	United States
4	Where's Your Head At	Basement Jaxx	United Kingdom
5	Betterman	John Butler Trio	Australia
6	Smooth Criminal	Alien Ant Farm	United States
7	Island in the Sun	Weezer	United States
8	Since I Left You	The Avalanches	Australia
9	Clint Eastwood	Gorillaz	United Kingdom
10	Short Skirt/Long Jacket	Cake	United States
11	Cherry Lips (Go Baby Go!)	Garbage	United States
12	Last Nite	The Strokes	United States
13	Three Dimensions	Something for Kate	Australia
14	Schism	Tool	United States
15	19-2000	Gorillaz	United Kingdom
16	Say What?	28 Days and Apollo 440	Australia/United Kingdom
17	Rockin' the Suburbs	Ben Folds	United States
18	Renegades of Funk	Rage Against the Machine	United States
19	Special Ones	George	Australia
20	Hash Pipe	Weezer	United States
21	Weapon of Choice	Fatboy Slim featuring Bootsy Collins	United Kingdom/United States
22	The Drugs Don't Work	Ben Harper & the Innocent Criminals	United States
23	This Mess We're In	PJ Harvey	United Kingdom
24	Dust Me Selecta	Gerling	Australia
25	Wake Up	Eskimo Joe	Australia
26	Little L	Jamiroquai	United Kingdom
27	Fat Cop	Regurgitator	Australia
28	Fall Down	Jebediah	Australia
29	Take	John Butler Trio	Australia
30	The Girl of My Dreams is Giving Me Nightmares	Machine Gun Fellatio	Australia
31	Planet Earth	Eskimo Joe	Australia
32	Special K	Placebo	United Kingdom
33	Getting Away with It (All Messed Up)	James	United Kingdom
34	Who Sold Her Out	Eskimo Joe	Australia
35	Thank You	Dido	United Kingdom
36	Pyramid Song	Radiohead	United Kingdom
37	Twenty Years	Something for Kate	Australia
38	Crystal	New Order	United Kingdom
39	Cocaine	The Cruel Sea	Australia
40	Elevation (Tomb Raider Mix)	U2	Ireland
41	Super Straight	Regurgitator	Australia
42	I Will Not Go Quietly (Duffy's Song)	The Whitlams	Australia
43	Souljacker Part I	Eels	United States
44	Androgyny	Garbage	United States
45	Strange Little Girl	Tori Amos	United States
46	Untitled	The Smashing Pumpkins	United States
47	There Is No Such Place	Augie March	Australia
48	Superstylin'	Groove Armada	United Kingdom
49	Parabola	Tool	United States
50	Just the Thing	Paul Mac featuring Peta Morris	Australia
51	Fifteen Feet of Pure White Snow	Nick Cave & the Bad Seeds	Australia
52	Man, It's So Loud in Here	They Might Be Giants	United States
53	Hey Driver	Motor Ace	Australia
54	The Rock Show	Blink-182	United States
55	One Step Closer	Linkin Park	United States
56	Kick a Hole in the Sky	You Am I	Australia
57	Get Up	You Am I	Australia
58	Bleed American	Jimmy Eat World	United States
59	Hard to Explain	The Strokes	United States
60	Pattern Against User	At the Drive-In	United States
61	One More Time	Daft Punk	France
62	You Give Me Something	Jamiroquai	United Kingdom
63	Downtown	Alex Lloyd	Australia
64	Hotel Yorba	The White Stripes	United States
65	Burn Baby Burn	Ash	United Kingdom
66	New York City Cops	The Strokes	United States
67	Not the Same	Ben Folds	United States
68	Making the Nouveau Riche	Blueline Medic	Australia
69	Up All Night	Unwritten Law	United States
70	Links 2-3-4	Rammstein	Germany
71	Outta My Head	Spiderbait	Australia
72	Roll On	The Living End	Australia
73	Plug In Baby	Muse	United Kingdom
74	Knives Out	Radiohead	United Kingdom
75	My Friend	Groove Armada	United Kingdom
76	Radio	The Avalanches	Australia
77	Hibernate	Big Heavy Stuff	Australia
78	A Simple Goodbye	The Cruel Sea	Australia
79	Imitation of Life	R.E.M.	United States
80	Bliss	Muse	United Kingdom
81	Butterfly	Crazy Town	United States
82	Home Entertainment System	Lazaro's Dog	Australia
83	Shining Light	Ash	United Kingdom
84	Starlight	The Supermen Lovers featuring Mani Hoffman	France
85	Invalid Litter Dept.	At the Drive-In	United States
86	Light on Your Shoulder	Rhubarb	Australia
87	Rock the Nation	Michael Franti & Spearhead	United States
88	Four on the Floor	Spiderbait	Australia
89	New Born	Muse	United Kingdom
90	60 Miles an Hour	New Order	United Kingdom
91	Fat Lip	Sum 41	Canada
92	Run	George	Australia
93	The Shame of Life	Butthole Surfers	United States
94	I Feel Loved	Depeche Mode	United Kingdom
95	Little Things	Good Charlotte	United States
96	Fuck Authority	Pennywise	United States
97	Step Back	Superheist	Australia
98	We Come 1	Faithless	United Kingdom
99	It Began in Afrika	The Chemical Brothers	United Kingdom
100	Sex and Violence	Endorphin	Australia

== Statistics ==
=== Artists with multiple entries ===
#	Artist	Entries
3	Something for Kate	2, 13, 37
3	The Strokes	12, 59, 66
3	Thom Yorke (Note: Once with PJ Harvey (23), and twice with Radiohead (36, 74))	23, 36, 74
3	Eskimo Joe	25, 31, 34
3	Muse	73, 80, 89
2	Alex Lloyd	1, 63
2	John Butler Trio	5, 29
2	Weezer	7, 20
2	The Avalanches	8, 76
2	Gorillaz	9, 15
2	Garbage	11, 44
2	Tool	14, 49
2	Ben Folds	17, 67
2	George	19, 92
2	Jamiroquai	26, 62
2	Regurgitator	27, 41
2	Radiohead	36, 74
2	New Order	38, 90
2	The Cruel Sea	39, 78
2	Groove Armada	48, 75
2	You Am I	56, 57
2	At the Drive-In	60, 85
2	Spiderbait	71, 88

=== Countries Represented ===
Country	Entries
Australia	38
United States	37
United Kingdom	23
France	2
Ireland	1
Germany	1
Canada	1

=== Records ===
- For the first time since 1996, the Hottest 100 winner from the previous year did not feature in the countdown.
- This is the first Hottest 100 not to feature Dave Grohl, who appeared in all previous countdowns with Nirvana and the Foo Fighters.
- Regurgitator made their sixth consecutive appearance in the Hottest 100, having appeared in every annual countdown since 1995.
  - Rage Against the Machine and The Whitlams both made their sixth consecutive appearance, having appeared since 1996.
  - Blink-182, Jebediah, The Living End, Something for Kate all made their fifth consecutive appearance, with all bands having appeared since 1997.
- The song "The Drugs Don't Work" by The Verve charted in the countdown for the second time after a cover by Ben Harper and the Innocent Criminals featured at No. 22. The original version charted in the same position in 1997. "Renegades of Funk" by Rage Against the Machine charted in the countdown for the second year in a row, having featured in the 2000 Hottest 100 at No. 95.
- Alex Lloyd is the first outright solo countdown winner since Denis Leary in the inaugural countdown.

== Top 10 Albums of 2001 ==
Bold indicates winner of the Hottest 100.

#	Artist	Album	Country of origin	Tracks in the Hottest 100
1	Something for Kate	Echolalia	Australia	2, 13, 37 (63 in 2002)
2	**Alex Lloyd**	**Watching Angels Mend**	**Australia**	**1, 63**
3	Eskimo Joe	Girl	Australia	25, 31, 34
4	The Strokes	Is This It	United States	12, 59, 66
5	John Butler Trio	Three	Australia	5, 29
6	Tool	Lateralus	United States	14, 49
7	Radiohead	Amnesiac	United Kingdom	36, 74
8	Ben Harper & The Innocent Criminals	Live from Mars	United States	22
9	Motor Ace	Five Star Laundry	Australia	53 (65, 98 in 2000)
10	Gorillaz	Gorillaz	United Kingdom	9, 15

== CD release ==
**Disc 1**
1. Alex Lloyd – "Amazing"
2. Basement Jaxx – "Where's Your Head At"
3. Something for Kate – "Monsters"
4. Alien Ant Farm – "Smooth Criminal"
5. Gorillaz – "Clint Eastwood"
6. Jebediah – "Fall Down"
7. Machine Gun Fellatio – "The Girl of My Dreams"
8. Groove Armada – "Superstylin'"
9. R.E.M – "Imitation of Life"
10. Nick Cave and the Bad Seeds – "15 Feet of Pure White Snow"
11. Gerling – "Dust Me Selecta"
12. Blink -182 – "The Rock Show"
13. Endorphin – "Sex & Violence"
14. At the Drive-In – "Pattern Against User"
15. James – "Getting Away With It (All Messed Up)"
16. Superheist – "Step Back"
17. The Chemical Brothers – "It Began in Afrika"
**Disc 2**
1. U2 – Elevation
2. 28 Days & Apollo 440 – "Say What?"
3. Daft Punk – "One More Time"
4. New Order – "Crystal"
5. The Cruel Sea – "Cocaine"
6. John Butler Trio – "Betterman"
7. Pennywise – "Fuck Authority"
8. Weezer – "Island in the Sun"
9. Blueline Medic – "Making the Nouveau Riche"
10. The Strokes – "Hard to Explain"
11. Eskimo Joe – "Planet Earth"
12. Unwritten Law – "Up All Night"
13. Spiderbait – "Outta My Head"
14. Placebo – "Special K"
15. George – "Special Ones"
16. Radiohead – "Pyramid Song"
17. Regurgitator – "Fat Cop"

== See also ==
- 2001 in music
