= Love Is a Drug (Eskimo Joe song) =

"Love is a Drug"

Single by Eskimo Joe

from the album Ghosts of the Past
- Released: 24 June 2011
- Recorded: 2010
- Genre: Alternative rock
- Length: 3:41
- Label: Warner
- Songwriter(s): Eskimo Joe (Kavyen Temperley, Stuart MacLeod & Joel Quartermain)
- Producer(s): Eskimo Joe

Eskimo Joe singles chronology
"When Were Kids" (2011)	"Love is a Drug" (2011)	"Echo" (2011)

"Love is a Drug" is a song by Australian rock band Eskimo Joe. It was released in June 2011 as the second single from their fifth studio album titled Ghosts of the Past. The song peaked at number 38 on the ARIA Singles Chart.

At the ARIA Music Awards of 2011, the song was nominated for Best Video.

At the APRA Music Awards of 2012, the song was nominated for Rock Work of the Year.

== Charts ==
Chart performance for "Love is a Drug"
Chart (2011)	Peak position
Australia (ARIA)	38

== Release history ==
Release history and formats for "Love is a Drug"
Region	Date	Label	Format	Catalogue
Australia	24 June 2011	Warner	Digital download	
