= Ghosts of the Past (album) =

Studio album by Eskimo Joe
- Released: 12 August 2011
- Recorded: The Grove Studios, January–February 2011
- Genre: Alternative rock
- Label: Warner, Dirt Diamonds
- Producer: Eskimo Joe

Eskimo Joe chronology
| Inshalla (2009) | Ghosts of the Past (2011) | Wastelands (2013) |

Singles from Ghosts of the Past
- 1. "When We Were Kids" Released: 20 May 2011; 2. "Love is a Drug" Released: 24 June 2011; 3. "Echo" Released: 3 September 2011; 4. "Speeding Car" Released: 13 January 2012

Professional ratings
Review scores
| Source | Rating |
|---|---|
| The Herald Sun | 3.5/5 stars |
| Rolling Stone | 4/5 stars |

Ghosts of the Past is the fifth studio album by Australian rock band Eskimo Joe, released on 12 August 2011.

It is the band's first album to be released on their independent record label, Dirt Diamonds Productions. In an interview with the band, they described the album's sound as less polished than their previous album. Recording for the album began in late 2010 and finished in February 2011.

The first track to be released was "When We Were Kids". On 24 June 2011, the second single titled "Love is a Drug" was released.

== Track listing ==
All tracks are written by Eskimo Joe.

| No. | Title | Length |
|---|---|---|
| 1. | "Gave It All Away" | 3:34 |
| 2. | "When We Were Kids" | 4:10 |
| 3. | "Love is a Drug" | 3:41 |
| 4. | "Echo" | 3:48 |
| 5. | "Speeding Car" | 3:49 |
| 6. | "Ghosts of the Past" | 3:04 |
| 7. | "Itch" | 3:50 |
| 8. | "Just Don't Feel" | 3:25 |
| 9. | "Drowning in the Fear" | 3:59 |
| 10. | "Words of Avoidance" | 4:33 |
| 11. | "Sky's on Fire" | 4:03 |

Enhanced CD downloadable bonus track
| No. | Title | Length |
|---|---|---|
| 12. | "Echo" (Live at the Basement) | 3:52 |

Limited edition bonus track
| No. | Title | Length |
|---|---|---|
| 12. | "Just Don't Feel" (Wastelands Version) | 3:39 |
| Total length: | | 45:32 |

iTunes bonus tracks
| No. | Title | Length |
|---|---|---|
| 12. | "Walk Away" | 4:09 |
| 13. | "Love is a Drug" (Live at the Basement) | 3:35 |
| 14. | "Love is a Drug" (video) | 3:43 |
| 15. | "Love is a Drug" (Behind the Scenes) | 2:59 |

== Personnel ==
Eskimo Joe

- Kavyen Temperley – vocals, bass, keyboards
- Stuart MacLeod – guitar, vocals
- Joel Quartermain – guitar, drums, vocals

Performance credits

- Hunter Temperley – hey's in "When We Were Kids"
- Mia Schafer Zaics – hey's in "When We Were Kids"
- Abeni Temperley – hey's in "When We Were Kids"

Visuals and imagery

- Brad Rimmer – photography
- Debaser – artwork

Instruments

- Aaron Wyatt – strings on "Sky's on Fire", "Speeding Car", "Itch", "Just Don't Feel"
- Emma McCoy – strings on "Sky's on Fire", "Speeding Car", "Itch", "Just Don't Feel"
- Rachael Aquilina – strings on "Sky's on Fire", "Speeding Car", "Itch", "Just Don't Feel"

Technical and production

- Eskimo Joe – production, engineering on "Just Don't Feel" (Wastelands Version), sequencing
- Matt Lovell – engineering
- Marcus Salisbury – engineering assistant
- Cenzo Townshend – mixing
- Andy Lawson – engineering, mixing on "Just Don't Feel"
- Joel Quartermain – mixing on "Just Don't Feel" (Wastelands Version)
- Leon Zervos – mastering
- James Hewgill – sequencing

Managerial

- Catherine Haridy – management

== Charts ==
| Chart (2011) | Peak position |
|---|---|
| Australian Albums (ARIA) | 3 |

== Release history ==
| Region | Date | Label | Format | Catalogue |
|---|---|---|---|---|
| Australia | 12 August 2011 | Warner, Dirt Diamonds | CD, digital download | 5249871941, 5249869322 |
| Australia | 2018 | Warner Music | LP | 5419700407 |
