= Eduardo and Rodriguez Wage War on T-Wrecks =

2001 studio album by Regurgitator

Studio album by Regurgitator
- Released: 16 July 2001
- Genre: Alternative rock; alternative hip hop
- Length: 44:39
- Label: East West
- Producer: Quan Yeomans; Ben Ely; Andy Gill

Regurgitator chronology
Generic City (2001)	Eduardo and Rodriguez Wage War on T-Wrecks (2001)	Jingles (2002)

Singles from Eduardo and Rodriguez Wage War on T-Wrecks
- 1. "Fat Cop" Released: June 2001; 2. "Super Straight" Released: October 2001; 3. "Hullabaloo" Released: January 2002

Eduardo and Rodriguez Wage War on T-Wrecks is the fourth studio album by Regurgitator, released in July 2001. It was the final studio album released on the East West/Warner label. The album peaked at number 7 on the ARIA Albums Chart.

The singles "Fat Cop" and "Super Straight" made it into Triple J's Hottest 100 for 2001.

== Track listing ==
No.	Title	Length
1.	"C'mon"	3:14
2.	"Fat Cop"	3:19
3.	"Super Straight"	4:18
4.	"Hullabaloo"	2:53
5.	"Head 1 Psycho"	3:09
6.	"Future Is Plastic"	2:24
7.	"Fuck the Goddamn World"	3:00
8.	"Famous"	2:54
9.	"Spooky Interlude"	2:04
10.	"Nothin Ever Happens"	1:11
11.	"Corpse Xplosion"	3:03
12.	"Astronaut Barbecue Party"	2:22
13.	"The Man: Part 1"	2:55
14.	"The Man: Part 2"	7:45

Japanese edition bonus track
No.	Title	Length
15.	"A Bug Flew in My Eye"	6:29

== Charts ==
Chart (2001)	Peak position
Australian Albums (ARIA)	7

== Release history ==
Region	Date	Format	Label	Catalogue
Australia	July 2001	CD	EastWest Records	8573879812
Australia	October 2019	Vinyl	Valve Records	RV159
