= I Wanna Be a Nudist =

1999 single by Regurgitator

Single by Regurgitator

from the album ...art
- Released: November 1999
- Recorded: 1999
- Length: 2:01
- Label: Warner Music Australasia
- Songwriter: Ben Ely
- Producers: Magoo, Ben Ely

Regurgitator singles chronology
"Happiness (Rotting My Brain)" (1999)	"I Wanna Be a Nudist" (1999)	"Freshmint!" (2000)

"I Wanna Be a Nudist" is a song by Australian rock band Regurgitator. The song was released in November 1999 as the second single from the band's third studio album ...art. The single peaked at number 75 in Australia.

== Track listings ==
CD Single
No.	Title	Length
1.	"I Wanna Be a Nudist"	2:01
2.	"Kill Your TV"	2:15
3.	"Big Monster, Little Monster"	0:38
4.	"The Shark"	2:01
5.	"This Is God Talking from Outer Space"	1:55

== Music video ==
The music video has the bandmembers working at a fast food restaurant called "Regurgiburger".

The filming location of this music video was at a Bernie's fast food restaurant on Sandgate Road in the northern Brisbane suburb of Virginia, Queensland. As of 2022, the original fast food restaurant where the music video was filmed at has been torn down and a Guzman y Gomez Mexican fast food restaurant is built in its place.

== Charts ==
Chart performance for "I Wanna Be a Nudist"
Chart (1999)	Peak position
Australia (ARIA)	75

== Release history ==
Region	Date	Format	Label	Catalogue
Australia	November 1999	CD Single	EastWest, Warner	8573800672
