= Freshmint! =

2000 single by Regurgitator

Single by Regurgitator

from the album ...art
- B-side: "Kill the Goat, Man"; "Track by Ben"
- Released: March 2000
- Length: 3:55
- Label: EastWest
- Songwriter: Quan Yeomans
- Producers: Magoo; Quan Yeomans

Regurgitator singles chronology
"I Wanna Be a Nudist" (1999)	"Freshmint!" (2000)	"Crush the Losers" (2000)

"Freshmint!" is a song by Australian rock band Regurgitator. The song was released in March 2000 as the third and final single from the band's third studio album, ...art. The single peaked at number 44 in Australia.

== Track listings ==
CD single 1
No.	Title	Length
1.	"Freshmint!" (edit)	3:28
2.	"Freshmint!" (Cavity mix)	4:50
3.	"Freshmint!" (Harebrain & Doofus mix)	3:16
4.	"Kill the Goat, Man"	3:24

CD-ROM videos
No.	Title	Length
1.	"Freshmint!"
2.	"Happiness (Rotting My Brain)"
3.	"I Wanna Be a Nudist"

CD single 2
No.	Title	Length
1.	"Freshmint!" (edit)
2.	"Freshmint!" (remixed By Quan)
3.	"Freshmint!" (remixed By Soma Rasa)
4.	"Track by Ben"

== Charts ==
Chart (2000)	Peak position
Australia (ARIA)	44

== Release history ==
Region	Date	Format	Label	Ref.
Australia	March 2000	CD single	EastWest	
New Zealand	8 May 2000	CD single	EastWest	
