= Fat Cop =

2001 single by Regurgitator

Single by Regurgitator

from the album Eduardo and Rodriguez Wage War on T-Wrecks
- Released: June 2001
- Length: 3:22
- Label: Warner Music Australasia
- Songwriter(s): Ben Ely
- Producer(s): Ben Ely, Quan Yeomans

Regurgitator singles chronology
| "Are You Being Served" (2000) | "Fat Cop" (2001) | "Super Straight" (2001) |

"Fat Cop" is a song by Australian rock band Regurgitator. The song was released in June 2001 as the lead single from the band's fourth studio album Eduardo and Rodriguez Wage War on T-Wrecks. The single peaked at number 34 in Australia and it ranked at number 27 on Triple J's Hottest 100 in 2001.

In 2019, Tyler Jenke from The Brag ranked Regurgitator's best songs, with "Fat Cop" coming it at number 8. Jenke called the song "memorable" calling it "...a rap-rock influenced gem that tells the tale of the titular fat cop."

== Track listings ==
Australian CD Single
| No. | Title | Length |
|---|---|---|
| 1. | "Fat Cop" | 3:22 |
| 2. | "Baby Steps" | 3:55 |
| 3. | "Killer Budd" | 3:14 |
| 4. | "Lounge Rhinocerous" | 2:51 |

== Charts ==
| Chart (2001) | Peak position |
|---|---|
| Australia (ARIA) | 34 |

== Release history ==
| Region | Date | Format | Label | Catalogue |
|---|---|---|---|---|
| Australia | June 2001 | CD Single | EastWest, Warner | 8573882542 |
