= APRA Music Awards of 2010 =

Annual Australian music awards

- Date: 21 June 2010
- Location: Sydney Convention Centre; Sydney, Australia

The Australasian Performing Right Association Awards of 2010 (generally known as APRA Music Awards) was the 28th annual ceremony by the Australasian Performing Right Association (APRA) to award outstanding achievements in contemporary songwriting, composing and publishing. They are a series of awards which include the APRA Music Awards and Screen Music Awards. The APRA Music Awards ceremony was held on 21 June at the Sydney Convention Centre, they were presented by APRA and the Australasian Mechanical Copyright Owners Society (AMCOS) and included the new category, 'Rock Work of the Year'. A total of 12 awards were presented. The Screen Music Awards were issued on 9 November by APRA and Australian Guild of Screen Composers (AGSC). The 2010 Classical Music Awards were suspended and were replaced by the Art Music Awards from 2011 held in May that year. They included jazz categories. Art Music Awards are sponsored by APRA and the Australian Music Centre (AMC).

== Awards ==
Nominees and winners with results indicated on the right.

=== APRA Music Awards ===
Song of the Year
Title	Artist	Writer	Result
"All I Want"	Sarah Blasko	Sarah Blasko	Nominated
"Big Big Love"	Troy Cassar-Daley	Troy Cassar-Daley	Nominated
"Sweet Disposition"	The Temper Trap	Abby Mandagi, Lorenzo Sillitto	Won
"The Last Day on Earth"	Kate Miller-Heidke	Kate Miller-Heidke, Keir Nuttall	Nominated
"We Are the People"	Empire of the Sun	Luke Steele, Jonathon Sloan, Nick Littlemore	Nominated
Songwriters of the Year
Writer		Artist	Result
Angus Young, Malcolm Young		AC/DC	Won
Breakthrough Songwriter of the Year
Writer		Artist	Result
Jonathon Aherne, Tobias Dundas, Abby Mandagi, Lorenzo Sillitto		The Temper Trap	Nominated
Luke Steele, Jonathon Sloan, Nick Littlemore		Empire of the Sun	Won
Jessica Mauboy		Jessica Mauboy	Nominated
Daniel Merriweather		Daniel Merriweather	Nominated
Lisa Mitchell		Lisa Mitchell	Nominated
Ted Albert Award For Outstanding Services to Australian Music
Name			Result
Jimmy Little			Won
Most Played Australian Work
Title	Artist	Writer	Result
"Been Waiting"	Jessica Mauboy	Jessica Mauboy, Israel Cruz, Craig Hardy	Nominated
"Foreign Land"	Eskimo Joe	Stuart MacLeod, Joel Quartermain, Steve Parkin, Kavyen Temperley	Won
"Hey Boys and Girls (Truth of the World pt.2)"	Evermore	Jon Hume, Daniel Hume	Nominated
"Raise the Alarm"	The Living End	Christopher Cheney	Nominated
"She's a Genius"	Jet	Christopher Cester	Nominated
Most Played Australian Work Overseas
Title	Artist	Writer	Result
"Rock 'n' Roll Train"	AC/DC	Angus Young, Malcolm Young	Won
International Work of the Year
Title	Artist	Writer	Result
"Gives You Hell"	The All-American Rejects	Tyson Ritter, Nick Wheeler	Nominated
"Love Story"	Taylor Swift	Taylor Swift	Nominated
"Second Chance"	Shinedown	Brent Smith, Dave Bassett	Nominated
"Sober"	Pink	Floyd Hills, Alecia Moore, Kara DioGuardi, Marcella Araica	Nominated
"You Found Me"	The Fray	Joseph King, Isaac Slade	Won
Blues & Roots Work of the Year
Title	Artist	Writer	Result
"Breakout"	Ash Grunwald	Ashley Groenewald, Pip Norman	Won
"Bring Back the Fire"	Bonjah	Daniel Chisholm, Regan Lethbridge, James Majernik, David Morgan, Glenn Mossop	Nominated
"Can't Help Myself"	The Bamboos	Lance Ferguson, Daniel Farrugia, Benedict Chijioke	Nominated
"Fly"	Bonjah	Daniel Chisholm, Regan Lethbridge, James Majernik, David Morgan, Glenn Mossop	Nominated
"Hold On"	James Grehan	James Grehan	Nominated
Country Work of the Year
Title	Artist	Writer	Result
"Big Big Love"	Troy Cassar-Daley	Troy Cassar-Daley	Won
"Come Home"	Brad Cole	Bradley Cole	Nominated
"Hell of a Ride"	Adam Brand	Adam Brand, Danny Meadows	Nominated
"I Ain't That Guy"	Steve Forde	Steven Forde, Danny Meadows	Nominated
"Kick It Up"	The McClymonts	Brooke McClymont, Trey Bruce	Nominated
Dance Work of the Year
Title	Artist	Writer	Result
"16 (Sneaky Sound System song)"	Sneaky Sound System	Angus McDonald, Connie Mitchell	Nominated
"If I Know You"	The Presets	Julian Hamilton, Kim Moyes	Nominated
"Release Me"	Zoe Badwi	Zoe Badwi, Grant Smillie, Ivan Gough, Colin Snape	Nominated
"Talk Like That"	The Presets	Julian Hamilton, Kim Moyes	Nominated
"Walking on a Dream"	Empire of the Sun	Nick Littlemore, Jonathon Sloan, Luke Steele	Won
Rock Work of the Year
Title	Artist	Writer	Result
"Foreign Land"	Eskimo Joe	Stuart MacLeod, Joel Quartermain, Steve Parkin, Kavyen Temperley	Won
"Hey Boys and Girls (Truth of the World pt.2)"	Evermore	Jon Hume, Daniel Hume	Nominated
"Raise the Alarm"	The Living End	Christopher Cheney	Nominated
"She's a Genius"	Jet	Christopher Cester	Nominated
"White Noise"	The Living End	Christopher Cheney	Nominated
Urban Work of the Year
Title	Artist	Writer	Result
"The Festival Song"	Pez	Perry Chapman, Matthew Colwell, Hailey Cramer, Stephen Mowat	Nominated
"On Tour"	Bliss n Eso	Mark Landon, Max MacKinnon, Jonathan Notley	Nominated
"Running Back"	Jessica Mauboy featuring Flo Rida	Jessica Mauboy, Audius Mtawarira, Sean Ray	Nominated
"Spaceship"	Spaceship	Harley Webster, Robert Conley, Spencer Davies	Nominated
"Still Standing"	Hilltop Hoods	Barry Francis, Matthew Lambert, Daniel Smith, Henry Lawes	Won
=== Screen Music Awards ===
Best Feature Film Score
Title		Composer	Result
Animal Kingdom		Antony Partos, Sam Petty	Nominated
Beneath Hill 60		Cezary Skubiszewski	Nominated
Mao's Last Dancer		Christopher Gordon	Won
The Waiting City		Michael Yezerski	Nominated
Best Music for an Advertisement
Title		Composer	Result
Abused Child Trust – "Don't Look Away"		Christopher Elves	Nominated
Expedia Housekeeping		Elliott Wheeler	Won
Sony Ericsson – "Space Hopper"		Ramesh Sathiah	Nominated
Weet-Bix Opera		Elliott Wheeler	Nominated
Best Music for Children's Television
Title		Composer	Result
Itty Bitty Ditties		Thomas Bettany, Benjamin Speed	Won
Snug as a Bug		Ryan Grogan, Hylton Mowday	Nominated
The Buffet of Life		Henrique Dib	Nominated
The Legend of Enyo – "Episode 126"		Russell Thornton	Nominated
Best Music for a Documentary
Title		Composer	Result
The Long Goodbye		Caitlin Yeo	Nominated
The Snowman		Benjamin Speed	Nominated
Trishna & Krishna: The Quest for Separate Lives		Nerida Tyson-Chew	Won
Wheels in Motion		Geoffrey Russell	Nominated
Best Music for a Mini-Series or Telemovie
Title		Composer	Result
A Model Daughter: The Killing of Caroline Byrne		Guy Gross	Won
Beauty and the Beast		Garry McDonald, Laurie Stone	Nominated
Wicked Love		Paul Healy	Nominated
Best Music for a Short Film
Title		Composer	Result
Apricot		Basil Hogios	Nominated
Kanowna		Geoffrey Russell	Nominated
The Lost Thing		Michael Yezerski	Won
Zero		Kyls Burtland	Nominated
Best Music for a Television Series or Serial
Series or Serial	Episode title	Composer	Result
My Place	"Episode 13: 1888 Victoria"	Roger Mason	Nominated
Rescue: Special Ops	"Series 1 Episode 1"	Nerida Tyson-Chew	Nominated
Tangle	"Episode 1"	Bryony Marks	Nominated
Underbelly: The Golden Mile	"Episode 13: Alpha & Omega"	Burkhard Dallwitz	Won
Best Original Song Composed for the Screen
Song title	Work	Composer	Result
"A Runner"	Road Train	Sophie Lowe, Rafael May	Nominated
"Hold Me" from	A Model Daughter: The Killing of Caroline Byrne	Guy Gross	Won
"Movin On"	Satisfaction, Season 3	Cameron Giles-Webb, Colin Simkins	Nominated
"The War Is Over"	The Chaser's War on Everything	Andrew Hansen, Chris Taylor	Nominated
Best Soundtrack Album
Title		Composer	Result
Accidents Happen		Antony Partos	Nominated
East of Everything 2		Greg J Walker	Nominated
The Last Confession of Alexander Pearce		Roger Mason	Nominated
Mao's Last Dancer		Christopher Gordon	Won
Best Television Theme
Title		Composer	Result
Gasp		Hylton Mowday	Nominated
My Place		Roger Mason	Won
Tangle		Bryony Marks	Nominated
The Poker Star		Jonathan Dreyfus	Nominated
Most Performed Screen Composer - Australia
Composer			Result
Adam Gock			Nominated
Dinesh Wicks			Nominated
Jay Stewart			Won
Neil Sutherland			Nominated
Most Performed Screen Composer - Overseas
Composer			Result
Alistair Ford			Nominated
Christopher Elves			Nominated
Neil Sutherland			Won
Ric Formosa, Danny Beckerman			Nominated

== See also ==
- Music of Australia
