= Older Than You =

2004 single by Eskimo Joe

Single by Eskimo Joe

from the album A Song Is a City
- Released: 3 October 2004
- Studio: Milkbar, Big Jesus Burger
- Length: 2:32
- Label: Festival Mushroom
- Songwriter(s): Stuart MacLeod, Joel Quartermain, Kavyen Temperley
- Producer(s): Paul McKercher, Eskimo Joe

Eskimo Joe singles chronology
"Smoke" (2004)	"Older Than You" (2004)	"Black Fingernails, Red Wine" (2006)

"Older Than You" is a song by Australian rock band Eskimo Joe, released in October 2004 as the third and final single from their second studio album, A Song Is a City (2004). The song peaked at number 46 on the Australian Singles Chart and was ranked at number 32 on Triple J's Hottest 100 of 2004. At the ARIA Music Awards of 2005, the song won the ARIA Award for Best Group while being nominated for Engineer of the Year and Producer of the Year with Paul McKercher.

== Background ==
Kav Temperley said "This song was written in autumn last year when I'd just split up with my girlfriend of four years and had gone over to Melbourne to meet up with a girl who I guess was one of the catalysts for the break up. Nothing had happened, but that window was there. We met up and the thing that I really appreciated about her is that she was a couple of years younger than me but her eyes were like the eyes of an old soul. So it's the story of us meeting up over there, but I held back 'cause it didn't seem right to simply jump from one relationship to the next. I have to trust in existence. It's a continuing story."

== Music video ==
The film clip for "Older Than You" was shot over 14 hours at Sydney's Hyde Park by director, Nash Edgerton, who had previously directed Eskimo Joe's "Liar" film clip.

== Track listing ==
All tracks are written by Eskimo Joe

CD single and iTunes EP
No.	Title	Length
1.	"Older Than You"	2:31
2.	"From the Sea" (Live at the Wireless)	3:25
3.	"Older Than You" (Live at the Wireless)	2:30
4.	"Car Crash" (Live at the Wireless)	3:45

== Charts ==
Chart (2004)	Peak position
Australia (ARIA)	46

== Release history ==
Region	Date	Format(s)	Label(s)	Catalogue	Ref.
Australia	3 October 2004	CD; digital download	Festival Mushroom	021932	
