= Wake Up (Eskimo Joe song) =

Single by Eskimo Joe

from the album Girl
- Released: 26 March 2001
- Recorded: August – November 2000
- Genre: Rock
- Length: 3:29
- Label: Modular
- Songwriter(s): Stuart MacLeod; Joel Quartermain; Kavyen Temperley
- Producer(s): Ed Buller & Eskimo Joe

Eskimo Joe singles chronology
"Ruby Wednesday" (2000)	"Wake Up" (2001)	"Who Sold Her Out" (2001)

"Wake Up" is a song by Eskimo Joe, released in March 2001 as the lead single from their debut album Girl.

At the ARIA Music Awards of 2001, the Ben Saunders directed video on the ARIA Award for Best Video.

== Track listing ==
All tracks are written by Eskimo Joe

CD single
No.	Title	Length
1.	"Wake Up"	3:31
2.	"Hey Now"	2:34

Cassingle
No.	Title	Length
1.	"Wake Up"	3:31
2.	"Hey Now"	2:34
3.	"Asio"	2:34

- Note: Program repeated both sides.

== Release history ==
Region	Date	Label	Format	Catalogue
Australia	26 March 2001	Modular	CD	MODCDS008
Australia	2001	Modular	Promo cassette Single	MODPRO16
