= Who Sold Her Out =

Single by Eskimo Joe

from the album Girl
- Released: 11 June 2001
- Recorded: August – November 2000
- Genre: Rock
- Length: 3:10
- Label: Modular
- Songwriter(s): Stuart MacLeod; Joel Quartermain; Kavyen Temperley
- Producer(s): Ed Buller & Eskimo Joe

Eskimo Joe singles chronology
"Wake Up" (2001)	"Who Sold Her Out" (2001)	"Planet Earth" (2001)

"Who Sold Her Out" is a song by Eskimo Joe, released in June 2001 as the second single from their debut album Girl. The single was released through Modular Recordings along with two b-sides; "Love List" and a demo version of "Take a Rest".

At the ARIA Music Awards of 2001, the song was nominated for Breakthrough Artist – Single.

The single was re-release as a double-A sided single with "Liar" where is debuted at number 94 on the ARIA Charts.

== Track listing ==
All tracks are written by Eskimo Joe

CD single
No.	Title	Length
1.	"Who Sold Her Out"	3:15
2.	"Love List"	3:13
3.	"Take a Rest" (Demo)	4:28

All tracks are written by Eskimo Joe

Double A sided single
No.	Title	Length
1.	"Who Sold Her Out"	3:13
2.	"Liar"	3:25
3.	"Old and New"	2:51

== Charts ==
Chart (2002)	Peak position
ARIA Albums Chart	94

== Release history ==
Region	Date	Label	Format	Catalogue
Australia	11 June 2001	Modular	CD	MODCDS009
Australia	March 2002	Modular	CD single	MODCDS014
