= Super Straight =

2001 single by Regurgitator

Single by Regurgitator

from the album Eduardo and Rodriguez Wage War on T-Wrecks
- Released: 2001
- Length: 3:36
- Label: Warner Music Australasia
- Songwriter: Quan Yeomans
- Producers: Ben Ely, Quan Yeomans

Regurgitator singles chronology
"Fat Cop" (2001)	"Super Straight" (2001)	"Hullabaloo" (2002)

Music video
- "Superstraight" on YouTube

"Super Straight" (also styled as Superstraight) is a song by Australian rock band Regurgitator. The song was released in October 2001 as the second single from the band's fourth studio album Eduardo and Rodriguez Wage War on T-Wrecks. The single peaked at number 55 in Australia and it ranked at number 41 on Triple J's Hottest 100 in 2001.

In 2019, Tyler Jenke from The Brag ranked Regurgitator's best songs, with "Super Straight" coming it at number 10. Jenke said "'Super Straight' might hold the distinction as Regurgitator's most 'normal'-sounding song, with lyrics that speak of a family hiding some dark secrets."

== Track listings ==
Australian CD Single
No.	Title	Length
1.	"Super Straight" (radio edit)	3:36
2.	"Super Straight" (super mix)	5:07
3.	"FTGW" (Kblam! mix)	4:12
4.	"Super Straight" (All Spent mix)	3:44
5.	"C'Mon" (video)	3:14

== Music video ==
The music video for 'Super Straight' was filmed in July 2001 at the Fairwinds gated townhouse community on Bognor Street in the southern Brisbane suburb of Tingalpa, Queensland.

== Charts ==
Chart performance for "Super Straight"
Chart (2001)	Peak position
Australia (ARIA)	55

== Release history ==
Region	Date	Format	Label	Catalogue
Australia	1 October 2001	CD Single	EastWest, Warner	0927412292
