= Happiness (Rotting My Brain) =

1999 single by Regurgitator

Single by Regurgitator

from the album ...art
- B-side: "Everybody Sleeps"; "Brain Dub"; "Mumbler"
- Released: July 1999
- Length: 3:56
- Label: EastWest
- Songwriter: Quan Yeomans
- Producers: Magoo; Quan Yeomans

Regurgitator singles chronology
"! (The Song Formerly Known As)" (1998)	"Happiness (Rotting My Brain)" (1999)	"I Wanna Be a Nudist" (1999)

Music video
- "Happiness" on YouTube

"Happiness (Rotting My Brain)" (titled "Happiness" on the album) is a song by Australian rock band Regurgitator. The song was released in July 1999 as the lead single from the band's third studio album, ...art. The single peaked at number 44 in Australia and 16 in New Zealand. It was ranked at number 62 on Triple J's Hottest 100 in 1999. The Paul Butler and Scott Walton-directed music video was nominated for Best Video at the ARIA Music Awards of 2000.

== Track listing ==
Australian CD single
No.	Title	Length
1.	"Happiness (Rotting My Brain)"	3:56
2.	"Everybody Sleeps"	2:15
3.	"Brain Dub"	3:58
4.	"Mumbler"	2:18

== Charts ==
Chart (1999)	Peak position
Australia (ARIA)	44
New Zealand (Recorded Music NZ)	16

== Release history ==
Region	Date	Format	Label	Catalogue	Ref.
Australia	July 1999	CD Single	EastWest	3984290152	
United States	12 June 2000	Hot adult contemporary radio	Ark 31	186 830 046 2	
