= The Bank Holidays =

Australian musical group

- Also known as: Tunnelball
- Origin: Perth, Western Australia, Australia
- Genre: Indie pop
- Years active: 2003–2012
- Labels: Lost & Lonesome; Love Is My Velocity
- Past members: Nat Carson; James Crombie; Wibekke Reczek; Ian "Stafford" Chater; Stuart Leach
- Website: thebankholidays.com

The Bank Holidays were an Australian indie pop band from Perth, which formed in 2003 as Tunnelball by Nat Carson (guitar, piano, vocals), James Crombie (bass guitar, vocals), Wibekke (Bekk) Reczek (guitar, vocals) and Ian (Stafford) Chater (drums). Late in 2007 Chater was replaced by Stuart Leach. They have issued two studio albums, As a Film (15 October 2007) and Sail Becomes a Kite (17 July 2010). By late 2012 they had effectively disbanded.

== History ==
The Bank Holidays were conceived by James (Jim) Crombie (bass guitar, vocals) and Wibekke (Bekk) Reczek (guitar, vocals) whilst holidaying in Norway (on Bekk's grandparents' farm), who several weeks later in London enlisted old school friend Nat Carson (guitar, piano, vocals) to form the band. On their return to Perth in 2003 they recruited drummer, Ian "Stafford" Chater. Late in 2007 Chater was replaced on drums by Stuart Leach. They played their first gig at The Swan Basement in Fremantle under the name Tunnelball, a suggestion from Darren Hanlon. They changed it to the Bank Holidays before their next gig at Perth's Hyde Park Hotel.

In September 2004 the band released their debut recording, a five-track extended play, Good Looks to Camera on Lost & Lonesome Recording Co. Sabian Wilde described the band as "Firmly entrenched in the realm of '60s pop, without any of that caustic tongue-in-cheek bitterness that sometimes afflicts revivalists" and that the EP is "a gem of a debut... that is self-assured, breezy and very, very catchy. Despite being a little too indie for those of the rawk persuasion, consistent rotation should wear those boundaries down like a smile melting a bad mood." Its lead track, "Tread Easy", won a WAMi Award in 2004 in the Indie Rock / Punk Category for Crombie and the group.

In February 2005 the group co-headlined with the Panics on a national tour, with the Bank Holidays releasing their second five-track EP, Day for Night, later that year. Its second track, "Like a Piano", was nominated at the WAMi Awards in that year for the Love category for Crombie, Reczek and the group; and its final track, "Not so Long Ago", was nominated for the Rock category for Crombie and the group. The Bank Holidays have also played with fellow Australian bands the Lucksmiths, Little Birdy, Youth Group, the Panda Band and Augie March, and have supported international acts, Belle and Sebastian and Peter, Bjorn and John.

At the 2007 WAMi Awards The Bank Holidays walked away with their first WAMington for 'Best Indie Pop Act'. The group completed recording of their debut album, As a Film, at the rural Victorian home studio of their producer, J Walker a.k.a. Machine Translations. It was released on 13 October 2007.

Crombie and Reczek had married by 2010. On 17 July the Bank Holidays released their second album, Sail Becomes a Kite. Jennifer Peters of the AU Review opined, "A surprising left turn for the delightful quartet, whose previous output has been exemplified by a giddy exuberance and sense of joyousness, Sail Becomes a Kite is an extraordinarily reflective and weighty indie-pop release... the outfit is more than capable of crafting unabashedly graceful and poignant tracks, fleshing out the production canvas along with the ever-growing gusto of their entrancing three-part harmonies." By 2012 the group's official website declared "The band is currently split between Perth and Melbourne, so a show is rare and exciting thing for us. Behold then, our appearance at Perth's This Is Nowhere festival!" They were scheduled to appear in October 2012. The Bank Holidays had effectively disbanded after that time. Meanwhile, Carson and Leach had formed another indie pop group, Captain Coach, in Melbourne which issued a single, "Done and Gone", in August 2013.

== Members ==
- Bekk Reczek (guitar, vocals)
- Nat Carson (guitar, piano, vocals)
- James Crombie (bass guitar, vocals)
- Stuart Leach (drums)
- Ian "Stafford" Chater (drums)

== Discography ==
=== Studio albums ===
Title	Details
As a Film	Released: October 2007; Label: Lost & Lonesome Records (L&L044); Format: CD, digital download
Sail Becomes a Kite	Released: July 2010; Label: Lost & Lonesome Records (L&L062); Format: CD, digital download

=== Extended plays ===
Title	Details
Good Looks to Camera	Released: September 2004; Label: Lost & Lonesome Records (L&L044); Format: CD, digital download (L&L018)
Day for Night	Released: September 2005; Label: Lost & Lonesome Records (L&L021); Format: CD, digital download

== Awards ==
=== WAM Song of the Year ===
The WAM Song of the Year was formed by the Western Australian Rock Music Industry Association Inc. (WARMIA) in 1985, with its main aim to develop and run annual awards recognising achievements within the music industry in Western Australia.

Year	Nominee / work	Award	Result (wins only)
2004	"Tread Easy"	Indie Rock/Punk Category	Won

=== West Australian Music Industry Awards ===
The West Australian Music Industry Awards (WAMIs) are annual awards presented to the local contemporary music industry, put on annually by the Western Australian Music Industry Association Inc (WAM).

Year	Nominee / work	Award	Result (wins only)
2007	The Bank Holidays	Best Indi Pop Act	Won
