= ...art =

1999 studio album by Regurgitator

Studio album by Regurgitator
- Released: 23 August 1999
- Genre: Alternative rock, electronica, electropop
- Length: 54:15
- Label: Warner Music Australia
- Producer: Quan Yeomans; Ben Ely; Lachlan Gould

Regurgitator chronology
Unit (1997)	...art (1999)	Eduardo and Rodriguez Wage War on T-Wrecks (2001)

Singles from ...art
- 1. "Happiness (Rotting My Brain)" Released: July 1999; 2. "I Wanna Be a Nudist" Released: November 1999; 3. "Freshmint!" Released: March 2000; 4. "Are You Being Served" Released: October 2000

Professional ratings
Review scores
Source	Rating
AllMusic	4.5/5 stars

...art is the third studio album from the Australian rock band Regurgitator, released in August 1999. The album was recorded in Byron Bay and was the final album with drummer Martin Lee. ...art peaked at number 2 on the ARIA Charts and was certified gold.

== Track listing ==
1. "Happiness (Rotting My Brain)" (Q. Yeomans) – 3:56
2. "Ghost" (B. Ely) – 3:40
3. "Freshmint!" (Q. Yeomans) – 3:55
4. "Strange Human Being" (Q. Yeomans) – 4:25
5. "I Wanna Be a Nudist" (B. Ely) – 2:02
6. "I Like Repetitive Music" (Q. Yeomans) – 2:40
7. "Art" (B. Ely) – 1:05
8. "Feels Alright!" (B. Ely) – 3:45
9. "I Love Tommy Mottola" (Q. Yeomans) – 4:10
10. "Are U Being Served?" (Q. Yeomans) – 5:00
11. "Obtusian" (M. Lee/B. Ely) – 3:08
12. "The Lonely Guy" (Q. Yeomans) – 4:10
13. "Virtual Life" (B. Ely) – 4:57
14. "Metal" (B. Ely, hidden track) – 1:22

=== Japanese bonus tracks ===
14. "Everybody Sleeps" (Sesame Street) – 2:13
15. "The Shark" (B. Ely) – 2:03
16. "Kill Your TV" (Q. Yeomans/B. Ely/M. Lee) – 2:14

== Track information ==
- "Are U Being Served?" contains samples from the '70s UK BBC comedy Are You Being Served? theme song.
- Following the end of "Virtual Life", there are six minutes of silence before "Metal" plays; album pressings list Virtual Life as 12:19.
  - On the Japanese release, following the end of "Kill Your TV", there are two minutes of silence before "Metal" plays; album pressings list "Kill Your TV" as 5:36.
- The album was released on vinyl in 2019, with the second track, "Ghost", removed from the tracklist at Ben Ely's insistence. "I Wanna Be A Nudist" was moved into its position in the tracklist between "Happiness" and "Freshmint."

== Charts ==
=== Weekly charts ===
Chart (1999)	Peak position
Australian Albums (ARIA)	2
New Zealand Albums (RMNZ)	12

=== Year-end charts ===
Chart (1999)	Position
Australian Albums Chart	83

== Certifications ==
Region	Certification	Certified units/sales
Australia (ARIA)	Gold	35,000^{^}
^{^} Shipments figures based on certification alone.

== Release history ==
Region	Date	Format	Label	Catalogue
Australia	August 1999	CD	EastWest Records	3984290162
Australia	October 2019	Vinyl	Valve Records	RV158
