= Eskimo Joe (EP) =

EP by Eskimo Joe
- Released: 8 July 1999
- Recorded: 1999
- Genre: Rock
- Label: Modular

Eskimo Joe chronology
Sweater (1998)	Eskimo Joe (1999)	Girl (2001)

Singles from Eskimo Joe
- 1. "Turn Up Your Stereo" Released: 1999; 2. "Ruby Wednesday" Released: 1999

Eskimo Joe is the second extended play by Australian band, Eskimo Joe, released in July 1999. The EP peaked at number 94 on the ARIA Charts.

"Turn Up Your Stereo" and "Ruby Wednesday" received plenty of airplay on Australian youth radio station Triple J reaching #39 and #99 respectively on the Triple J Hottest 100 of 1999.

== Track listing ==
All tracks are written by Eskimo Joe

Eskimo Joe
No.	Title	Length
1.	"Ruby Wednesday"	1:33
2.	"SMO"	2:16
3.	"Turn Up Your Stereo"	3:38
4.	"Getaway"	2:35
5.	"Super G"	2:29
6.	"Video Piracy"	2:50

== Charts ==
Chart (1999)	Peak position
ARIA Albums Chart	94

== Release history ==
Region	Date	Label	Format	Catalogue
Australia	July 1999	Modular	CD	MODEP001
