= A Song Is a City =

Studio album by Eskimo Joe
- Released: 17 May 2004
- Recorded: August/September 2003
- Studio: Milkbar Studios and Big Jesus Burger Studios
- Genre: Rock
- Length: 38:34
- Label: Warner, Mushroom
- Producer: Paul McKercher and Eskimo Joe

Eskimo Joe chronology
Girl (2001)	A Song Is a City (2004)	Black Fingernails, Red Wine (2006)

Singles from A Song Is a City
- 1. "From the Sea" Released: 22 March 2004; 2. "Smoke" Released: June 2004; 3. "Older Than You" Released: October 2004; 4. "Life Is Better with You" Released: December 2004

Professional ratings
Review scores
Source	Rating
Allmusic	3/5 stars

A Song Is a City is the second studio album by Australian rock band Eskimo Joe, released on 17 May 2004. The album debuted and peaked at number 2 on the ARIA Charts.

At the ARIA Music Awards of 2004, the album was nominated for 6 awards, winning two; Engineer of the Year and Producer of the Year with Paul McKercher.

== Making of the album ==
Eskimo Joe recorded the album with Paul McKercher on production. Vocalist and bassist Kavyen Temperley said on the Festival Mushroom Records website that the album is based on his experiences living in Fremantle. "The whole album is really about me, my friends, the people I love, and Fremantle. It's the stories that go on between us. It's similar to the people in every place all over the world. For me, that's what I'm writing about. I'm definitely not writing about New York City. I'm writing about Fremantle."

== Track listing ==
=== 2004 release ===
All tracks are written by Eskimo Joe.

A Song Is a City
No.	Title	Length
1.	"Come Down"	3:31
2.	"From the Sea"	3:25
3.	"Life Is Better with You"	4:43
4.	"Older Than You"	2:32
5.	"A Song Is a City"	3:44
6.	"Don't Let It Fly"	2:48
7.	"I'm So Tired"	2:34
8.	"Seven Veils"	3:12
9.	"Smoke"	3:40
10.	"Carousel"	1:20
11.	"This Room"	3:33
12.	"Car Crash"	3:48

All tracks are written by Eskimo Joe.

Live At the Evelyn 2003 (Bonus disc)
No.	Title	Length
1.	"I'm So Tired"
2.	"Come Down"
3.	"Life Is Better with You"
4.	"A Song Is a City"
5.	"Older Than You"
6.	"Car Crash"
7.	"Seven Veils"
8.	"From the Sea"
9.	"This Room"

=== 2020 release ===
2020 anniversary edition
No.	Title	Length
1.	"Come Down"	3:30
2.	"From the Sea" (^{1})	3:23
3.	"Life Is Better with You"	4:41
4.	"Older Than You"	2:31
5.	"A Song Is a City"	3:43
6.	"Don't Let It Fly"	2:47
7.	"I'm So Tired"	2:32
8.	"Seven Veils"	3:10
9.	"Smoke"	3:39
10.	"Carousel"	1:18
11.	"This Room"	3:32
12.	"Car Crash"	3:48
13.	"See Saw"	3:12
14.	"This Room - Acoustic Version"	3:30
15.	"Commitment Bells"	4:30
16.	"Life Is Better With You (RTR Session)"	4:25
17.	"Come Down (RTR Session)"	3:33
18.	"Smoke (Live at the Chapel)"	4:09
19.	"This Room (Live at the Chapel)"	3:40
20.	"I'm So Tired (Live at the Chapel)"	4:36
21.	"From the Sea (Live from the Enmore Theatre)"	3:50
22.	"Older Than You (2020 Mix)"	2:43

^{1.} Unlike the original release, "Come Down" does not cross fade into "From the Sea".

== Charts ==
=== Weekly chart ===
Chart (2004/05)	Peak position
Australian Albums (ARIA)	2

=== Year-end charts ===
Chart (2004)	Rank
Australian Albums Chart	35

== Certifications ==
Region	Certification	Certified units/sales
Australia (ARIA)	2× Platinum	140,000^{^}
^{^} Shipments figures based on certification alone.

== Release history ==
Region	Date	Label	Format	Catalogue
Australia	17 May 2004	Warner, Mushroom	CD, CD (+Bonus CD), Digital download	337992
Australia	2020	Warner Music Australia	CD	5419707621
Australia	2020	Warner Music Australia	LP	5419707530
