= Eskimo Joe =

Australian band

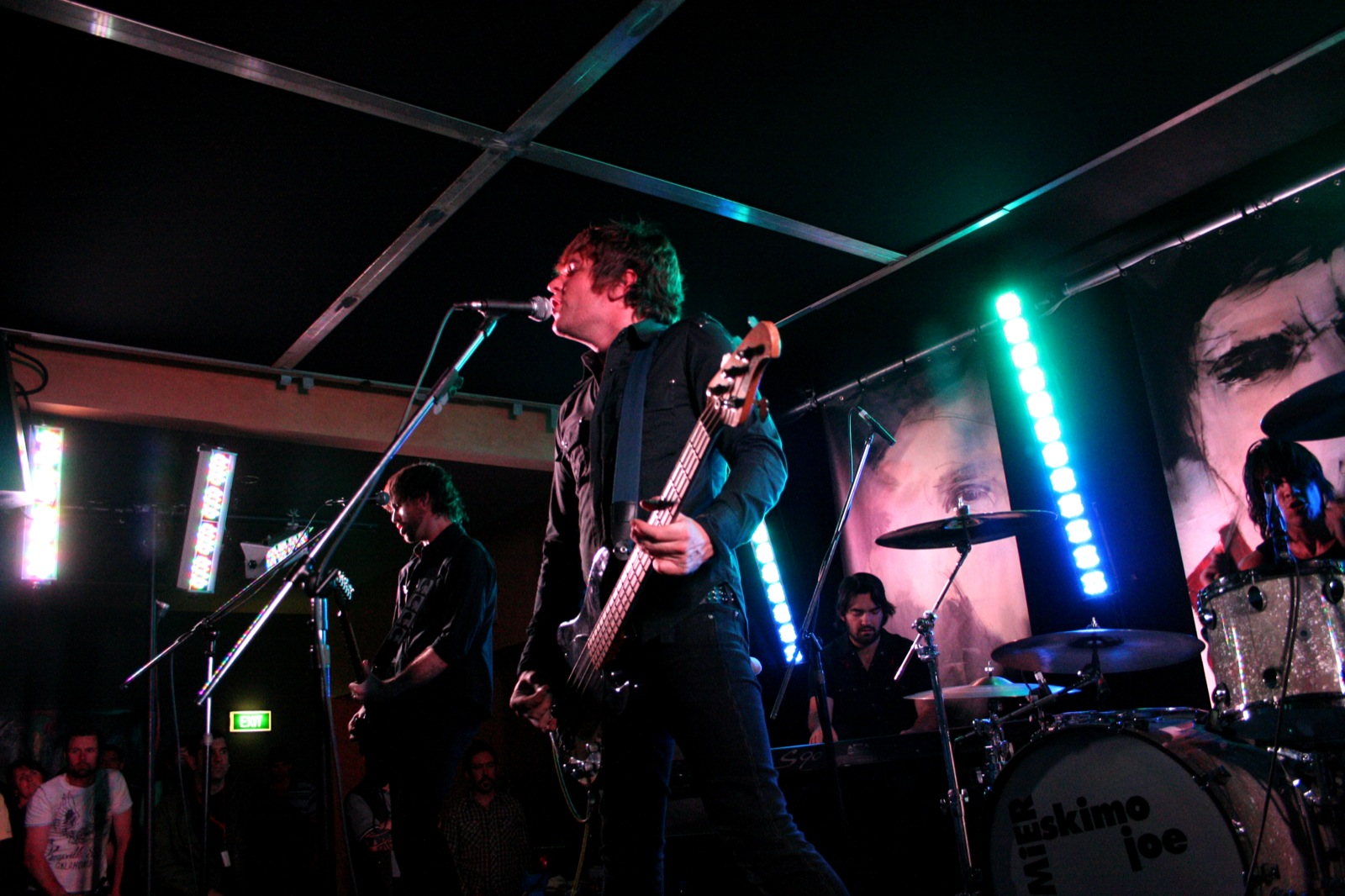
- Eskimo Joe at the Peninsula Lounge, Victoria, August 2006.

Background information
- Also known as: The Andy Callison Project
- Origin: East Fremantle, Western Australia, Australia
- Genre: Alternative rock
- Years active: 1997–present
- Labels: Troy Horse, Modular, Universal, Festival, Mushroom, Warner, Rykodisc, Dirt Diamonds
- Members: Stuart MacLeod; Joel Quartermain; Kavyen Temperley
- Website: www.eskimojoe.net

Eskimo Joe are an Australian alternative rock band that was formed in 1997 by Stuart MacLeod, on lead guitar, Joel Quartermain, on drums and guitar, and Kavyen Temperley, on bass guitar and vocals, in East Fremantle, Western Australia, Australia.

The band has released five additional albums since their debut album Girl was released in 2001: A Song Is a City, released in 2004; Black Fingernails, Red Wine, released in 2006; Inshalla, released in May 2009; Ghosts of the Past, released on 12 August 2011; and Wastelands, released on 20 September 2013. Eskimo Joe have won eight ARIA Music Awards; in 2006, the band achieved four wins—from nine nominations—for work associated with Black Fingernails, Red Wine.

== History ==
=== 1995–1999: Early years ===
Eskimo Joe founders MacLeod and Temperley were school mates at John Curtin Senior High School. Temperley left school at sixteen to concentrate on writing music, moving into a share house with Simon Leach, who played bass guitar in a funk band called Carpet. The other members were his brother Stuart on drums and guitarist Joel Quartermain—all three were former students at Hollywood Senior High School. When Temperley joined Carpet they changed the name to Freud's Pillow. The band performed around Perth and Fremantle from 1995 to 1998, and released an EP Pleasure Puppy in 1997; MacLeod, although not a member, is credited with co-writing "Mr Hoek" on the EP. Despite their modest popularity, Quartermain and Temperley were unhappy with the band's musical style. While recording the EP, Temperley started jamming for a side project with MacLeod, writing several short and simple pop–punk songs. They auditioned a number of drummers and eventually settled on Quartermain, who they believed was more musical.

Formed as an alternative rock group in 1997 in East Fremantle, Eskimo Joe was initially a side project of Freud's Pillow, with MacLeod on guitar, Quartermain on drums and guitar, and Temperley on bass guitar and vocals. Eskimo Joe's first gig was in August 1997 at the University of Western Australia, in a local heat for the National Campus Band Competition—they proceeded to the state final in Perth and then the national final in Sydney. For winning the national final, they were awarded a place at the 1997 Livid Festival in Brisbane and a studio recording session in Sydney.

Freud's Pillow officially split within a few months of Eskimo Joes' win. Simon Leach eventually formed Little Birdy in 2002, while Stuart played drums for One Horse Town and later for The Bank Holidays. In April 1998, Eskimo Joe recorded their debut release the Sweater EP. Its title track, "Sweater", received significant airplay on national Australian radio station Triple J and reached No. 33 on the station's Hottest 100 of 1998.

After touring for numerous months, Eskimo Joe returned to the studio and, in 1999, issued a second EP, the self-titled Eskimo Joe. Two tracks, "Ruby Wednesday" and "Turn Up Your Stereo", were voted into the Triple J Hottest 100 of that year. The band were voted into the No. 2 position on the 'Brightest Hope' list by the readers of Rolling Stone (Australia).

=== 1999–2001: Girl ===
Eskimo Joe signed with Universal Records' alternative offshoot Modular, in 1999. They recorded their debut album, Girl, with producer Ed Buller (Ben Lee, Pulp, Suede). It reached No. 29 on the ARIA Albums Chart and was certified gold. Tracks such as "Who Sold Her Out" and "Planet Earth" received airplay on Triple J, with the former reaching the top 100 on the ARIA Singles Chart and the latter listed at No. 31 on Triple J's Hottest 100 of 2001. Some tracks featured on TV series, The Secret Life of Us. Rock music journalist, Ed Nimmervoll, compared the album to their earlier work, "The nonsensical songs about stereos, alcohol and farting were replaced by Beatlesque highly relatable songs about the ups and downs about the day-to-day life". The band's live shows began to incorporate keyboards and an extra guitar. At the ARIA Music Awards of 2001, the band's single, "Wake Up", with a promotional clip by Ben Saunders, won the 'Best Video' category.

=== 2002–2005: A Song Is a City ===
Despite Girl being a top 30 album and earning a gold record, Modular ended the band's contract. Eskimo Joe signed with Festival Mushroom Records in 2002. They recorded their second album, A Song Is a City, produced by Paul McKercher and mixed by Nick Launay, in 2003. Released in May 2004, it peaked at No. 2 and, by 2006, achieved double platinum status. For live shows, Quartermain switched to guitar and Paul Keenan – also from Fremantle – played drums, and Dan Bull played keyboards. At the time of the album's release, Temperley explained:

The whole album is really about me, my friends, the people I love and Fremantle. It's the stories that go on between us. It's similar to the people in every place all over the world. For me, that's what I'm writing about. I'm definitely not writing about New York. I'm writing about Fremantle.

The lead single "From the Sea" reached the top 40 in March 2004, and was number-one on the Triple J Net 50. It was used as the backing track for a series of TV ads for the West Coast Eagles Football Club. "Smoke" was released as the second single and was listed in the top 5 on Triple J's Net 50 in May. The third single, "Older Than You", became their second top 50 ARIA Singles Chart hit after they performed it at the ARIA Music Awards of 2004 in October. At the ceremony, A Song Is a City won two awards for 'Producer of the Year' and 'Engineer of the Year' for both McKercher and Eskimo Joe.

==== DVD ====
In August 2005, the Eskimo Joe DVD was released with all the film clips for tracks from the Eskimo Joe EP and the first two albums, a feature-length documentary, a collection of live performances, and some rare tracks, including "Sweater". They won 'Best Group' at the ARIA Music Awards of 2005 for "Older Than You".

=== 2006–2008: Black Fingernails, Red Wine ===
MacLeod arranged for the band to produce their third album, Black Fingernails, Red Wine, themselves, which "shifted the emphasis from the songs and their performance to an over-all sound". Its title track, "Black Fingernails, Red Wine", released in May 2006, which peaked at No. 6, became their first Top 10 single. The song also reached No. 1 on ARIA's digital track chart. The album followed in June and debuted at No. 1 on the ARIA Albums Chart. It spent 51 weeks in the Top 50 and achieved four times platinum status. Its second single, "Sarah", was issued in September and peaked at No. 12. The B-sides are live and acoustic versions of "Black Fingernails, Red Wine" and a cover of the Pixies' "Hey" recorded for Triple J's Like a Version collection. The third single "New York" was released early in 2007 and reached No. 26. The fourth single, "Breaking Up", in which the music video starred actress Teresa Palmer, attained the top 100. In August, "Black Fingernails, Red Wine", was issued as the band's debut United States single. The fifth Australian single, "London Bombs", was released in October as a digital only single. The song was awarded first place in the 'Performance Category' at the 2007 International Songwriting Competition. At the ARIA Music Awards of 2006, Eskimo Joe were nominated for nine awards and won four. Black Fingernails, Red Wine won 'Producer of the Year' for Eskimo Joe and 'Engineer of the Year' for Matt Lovell, "Black Fingernails, Red Wine" won 'Single of the Year' and Eskimo Joe won Best Music DVD.

=== 2009-2010: Inshalla ===
Their fourth studio album, Inshalla, was released in May 2009. The group had played tracks at gigs prior to its release, including the title track, "Inshalla". The term, insha'Allah is Arabic for 'God willing' which Temperley had heard during a visit to Egypt. According to Nimmervoll, "The album was put together in the same spirit, instead of the extremelely [sic] focused record they had wanted with Black Fingernails, Red Wine with Inshalla Eskimo Joe let the songs and the music take them wherever they led". The lead single, "Foreign Land", was issued in April and peaked at No. 13. Inshalla became the band's second album to debut at No. 1, and remained in the charts for 17 weeks. It was nominated at the ARIA Music Awards of 2009 for 'Album of the Year'. The second single, "Losing Friends Over Love", released in June failed to chart. However, the third single, "Don't Let Me Down", which was released in September, reached No. 50.

=== 2011: Ghosts of the Past ===
They recorded their fifth album, Ghosts of the Past, in February 2011 at The Grove Studios in Sydney and the new Wasteland Studios in O'Connor, which is owned by the band under their own label, Dirt Diamonds. In May, the group announced that Ghosts of the Past was due for release on 12 August. It has the band aiming for more honesty and less polish than "Inshalla". The album will contain 12 new songs. Some tracks include "Love Is a Drug", "Itch", "Running", "Speeding Car", "When We Were Kids" and "Gave It All Away". The first single from the album "Love Is a Drug" was first performed at 2011 Southbound Music Festival in Busselton and was released on iTunes on 24 June.

=== 2012–2013: Wastelands ===
To record the band's sixth album, a fundraising campaign was launched in November 2012 through the Pozible website (a service also used by fellow Australian musician Clare Bowditch for her Big Hearted Business initiative)—Pozible is self described as "a crowdfunding platform and community-building tool for creative projects and ideas. It was developed to help people raise funds, realise their aspirations and make great things possible." As of 8 February 2013, the campaign had raised AUS$60,636 in pledges, with 12 hours to go, above the initial target of AUS$40,000. In its subscriber newsletter, the band revealed that:

The decision to crowd fund the new album has allowed the band to take a fresh approach with the new album and work unhindered to create the strongest possible new work. With all of the generosity and support the band has received, the campaign has been successful and the band are now looking forward to beginning work on the album in March.

The band also offered previews of the pre-production process for the sixth album on its official YouTube channel—the first preview was published on 17 December 2012, while subsequent video segments were published on 14 January 2013 and 28 January 2013.

Temperley revealed in a pre-album-release interview that the band felt "dusty" following the decreased popularity of Ghosts of the Past. He explained, "We needed a third party to come in so we could just be a band" and stated that the band was motivated to hire producer Burke Reid after he admitted that he was not a fan of their music. Temperley also provided insight into the album's musical influences, citing Leonard Cohen and stating, "I always refer back to the sounds I have always loved and for me Beck and LCD Soundsystem are where it's at." Two synthesizers that belonged to Temperley, a Jupiter 4 and a Roland Compurhythm 100, were used during the entire recording process.

The release of Wastelands on 20 September 2013 was accompanied by a livestreamed session (using the Soundrop app, part of the Spotify music website) consisting of a live chat and a performance of the new album.

=== 2020–present: The World Repeats Itself Somehow ===
On 26 June 2020, Eskimo Joe released "Say Something", their first single in seven years.

In September 2021, the band announced their first greatest hits album, The World Repeats Itself Somehow, which was released on 10 December 2021.

== Tours ==
In November 2006, Eskimo Joe played at the CMJ Music Festival in New York City, returning to Australia for Southbound in Western Australia and the Falls Festival in Victoria and Tasmania. They performed on all legs of the 2007 Big Day Out concerts. In July, they played at the Australian leg of Live Earth in Sydney. At the end of that month, they had a secret gig in Perth under a pseudonym, The Andy Callison Project, as a warm-up to their US tour. Joining Eskimo Joe's line-up for live shows were Lee Jones on keyboards and Shaun Sibbes on drums. In January 2008, Eskimo Joe performed in New York, Houston and Los Angeles as part of the annual G'day USA – Australia Week. Later that year, the group performed at both the East Coast and West Coast Blues & Roots Festivals (Byron Bay and Fremantle, respectively).

In March 2009, Eskimo Joe performed at the Sound Relief concert at the Sydney Cricket Ground. Sound Relief was a benefit concert for victims of the Victorian Bushfire Crisis and the Queensland floods. Appearing with Eskimo Joe at the Sydney concert were, Coldplay, Hoodoo Gurus, Icehouse, Jet, Josh Pyke, Little Birdy, The Presets, Wolfmother, You Am I and additional artists. Prior to the benefit concert the band played in Perth as The Andy Callison Project.

On 22 August 2012, the band was announced as the opening act for the launch of the Melbourne Spring Racing Carnival in Australia.

The 'Winter Warmer' tour was announced in late May 2013 and the band explained that they would be playing acoustically at intimate and unusual venues across Australia. The tour will consist of two-hour acoustic-based shows in which the band will reinterpret a selection of songs from every album in the band's history. Temperley stated: "We've got a few a new songs that we're going to try out acoustically with some re-working of old songs too. We feel really lucky to have such a beautiful and unique venues to do this in."

To commemorate the tenth anniversary of the Song Is A City album, described by Temperley as a "turning point for myself both personally and musically", Temperley announced a solo Australian tour in June 2014. Temperley explained, "I love it how the whole album works on just an acoustic guitar, and there are so many stories that now, from a safe distance, I'm ready to tell", in regard to the tour that will occur from July to September 2014. During the tour, Temperley will share the stories that influenced the songs and will also play cover versions of some songs that influenced the album.

In 2026, Eskimo Joe are touring to celebrate 20 YEARS OF BLACK FINGERNAILS RED WINE with Alex Lloyd nationally in Australia.

== Other activities ==
In April 2010, Eskimo Joe were announced as the 'number-one ticket-holder' for the Fremantle Football Club, replacing golfer Nick O'Hern. Quartermain joked that they may pen a club song: "We'll give it a crack. We're back here this winter writing our new record so, while we're at it, we may as well knock off a new theme song." The band held the honour until 2012, being replaced by Victoria Cross recipient Ben Roberts-Smith.

A National Office for Live Music was launched by Australian Prime Minister Kevin Rudd in July 2013; and, as of August 2013, Temperley is the state ambassador for Western Australia.

== Members ==
Core members

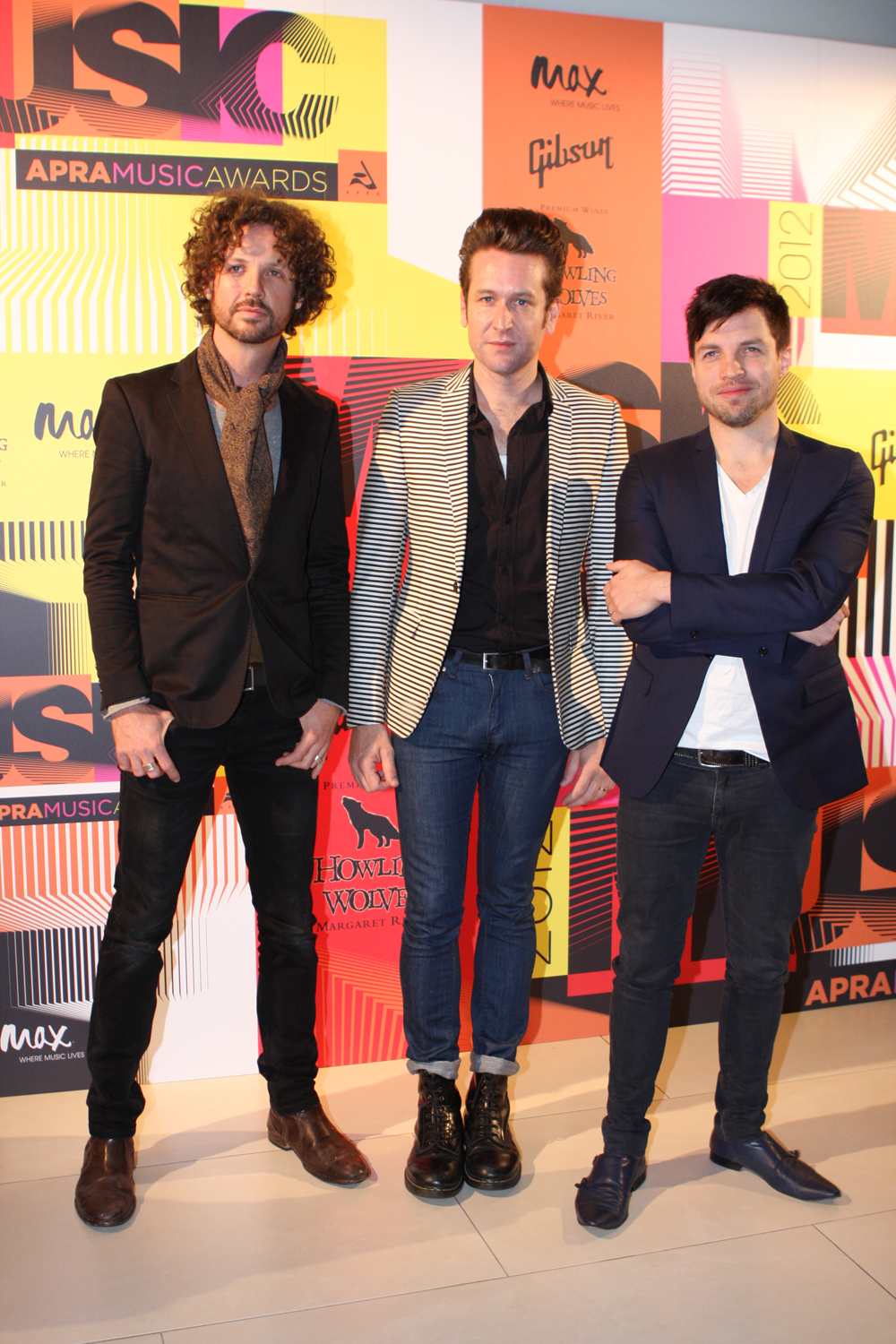
Eskimo Joe 2012

The core members of Eskimo Joe are:

- Stuart MacLeod– guitar, backing vocals (1997–present)
- Joel Quartermain– drums (on recordings), guitar, keyboards, backing vocals (1997–present)
- Kavyen Temperley– bass guitar, keyboards, vocals (1997–present)

Auxiliary members

A number of musicians have played with the band on tour and on recordings. They include:

- Dan Bull – keyboards
- Fergus Deasey – keyboards/guitar
- Fraser Cringle – drums
- Paul Keenan – drums
- Michael de Grussa – keyboards
- Shaun Sibbes – drums
- Lee Jones – keyboards
- Nic Jonsson – drums
- Tony Bourke – keyboards/guitar
- Holly Young – Sousaphone
- Timothy Nelson - keyboards/guitar

== Discography ==
- Girl (2001)
- A Song Is a City (2004)
- Black Fingernails, Red Wine (2006)
- Inshalla (2009)
- Ghosts of the Past (2011)
- Wastelands (2013)

== Management ==
Eskimo Joe are managed by Catherine Haridy Management.

== Awards and nominations ==
=== APRA Awards ===
The APRA Awards are presented annually from 1982 by the Australasian Performing Right Association (APRA).

Year	Nominee / work	Award	Result
2005	"From the Sea" (Finlay Beaton, Stuart MacLeod, Joel Quartermain)	Song of the Year	Nominated
2007	"Black Fingernails, Red Wine " (Stuart MacLeod, Joel Quartermain, Kav Temperley)	Song of the Year	Nominated
2008	"New York" (Stuart MacLeod, Joel Quartermain, Kav Temperley)	Most Played Australian Work	Nominated
2010	"Foreign Land" (Stuart MacLeod, Joel Quartermain, Steve Parkin, Kavyen Temperley) – Eskimo Joe	Most Played Australian Work	Won
2010	"Foreign Land" (Stuart MacLeod, Joel Quartermain, Steve Parkin, Kavyen Temperley) – Eskimo Joe	Rock Work of the Year	Won
2010	"Foreign Land" (Stuart MacLeod, Joel Quartermain, Steve Parkin, Kavyen Temperley) – Eskimo Joe	Song of the Year	Shortlisted
2012	"Love is a Drug" (Stuart MacLeod, Joel Quartermain, Kav Temperley)	Rock Work of the Year	Nominated
2012	"Love is a Drug" (Stuart MacLeod, Joel Quartermain, Kav Temperley)	Song of the Year	Shortlisted
2025	"The First Time" (Stuart MacLeod, Joel Quartermain, Kav Temperley)	Most Performed Rock Work	Nominated

=== ARIA Awards ===
The ARIA Music Awards are presented annually from 1987 by the Australian Recording Industry Association (ARIA). Eskimo Joe have won eight awards from thirty five nominations.

Year	Nominee / work	Award	Result
2001	"Wake Up" – Ben Saunders	Best Video	Won
2001	"Who Sold Her Out"	Breakthrough Artist – Single	Nominated
2002	Girl	Breakthrough Artist – Album	Nominated
2002	"Liar"	Best Video	Nominated
2004	A Song Is a City – Peter Barrett & Eskimo Joe	Best Cover Art	Nominated
2004	A Song Is a City – Paul McKercher & Eskimo Joe	Engineer of the Year	Won
2004	A Song Is a City – Paul McKercher & Eskimo Joe	Producer of the Year	Won
2004	A Song Is a City	Best Group	Nominated
2004	A Song Is a City	Best Rock Album	Nominated
2004	A Song Is a City	Album of the Year	Nominated
2004	"From the Sea"	Single of the Year	Nominated
2005	"Older Than You"	Best Group	Won
2005	"Older Than You" – Paul McKercher & Eskimo Joe	Engineer of the Year	Nominated
2005	"Older Than You" – Paul McKercher & Eskimo Joe	Producer of the Year	Nominated
2006	Black Fingernails, Red Wine – Matt Lovell	Engineer of the Year	Won
2006	Black Fingernails, Red Wine – Eskimo Joe	Producer of the Year	Won
2006	Black Fingernails, Red Wine	Album of the Year	Nominated
2006	Black Fingernails, Red Wine	Best Rock Album	Nominated
2006	Black Fingernails, Red Wine	Best Group	Nominated
2006	Black Fingernails, Red Wine – Dane Lovett, Dave Snow	Best Cover Art	Nominated
2006	"Black Fingernails, Red Wine"	Single of the Year	Won
2006	"Black Fingernails, Red Wine"	Best Video	Nominated
2006	Eskimo Joe: The DVD	Best Music DVD	Won
2007	"Sarah"	Best Group	Nominated
2009	Inshalla	Album of the Year	Nominated
2009	Inshalla	Best Rock Album	Nominated
2009	Inshalla	Best Group	Nominated
2009	Inshalla – Jimi Maroudas	Engineer of the Year	Nominated
2009	Inshalla – Mathematics	Best Cover Art	Nominated
2011	Ghosts of the Past	Album of the Year	Nominated
2011	Ghosts of the Past	Best Rock Album	Nominated
2011	Ghosts of the Past	Best Group	Nominated
2011	Ghosts of the Past	Engineer of the Year	Nominated
2011	Ghosts of the Past	Producer of the Year	Nominated
2011	"Love Is a Drug" - Bart Borghesi	Best Video	Nominated

=== Environmental Music Prize ===
The Environmental Music Prize is a quest to find a theme song to inspire action on climate and conservation. It commenced in 2022.

Year	Nominee / work	Award	Result	Ref.
2022	"Say Something"	Environmental Music Prize	Nominated	

=== MTV Australia Video Music Award ===
The MTV Australia Video Music Award were presented annually from 2005 to 2009 by MTV Australia.

Year	Nominee / work	Award	Result
2007	Black Fingernails, Red Wine	Best Rock Video	Nominated
2007	Black Fingernails, Red Wine	Download of the Year	Nominated
2007	Eskimo Joe	Best Group	Nominated

=== Vanda & Young Global Songwriting Competition ===
The Vanda & Young Global Songwriting Competition is an annual competition that "acknowledges great songwriting whilst supporting and raising money for Nordoff-Robbins" and is coordinated by Albert Music and APRA AMCOS. It commenced in 2009.

Year	Nominee / work	Award	Result
2009	"Foreign Land"	Vanda & Young Global Songwriting Competition	2nd

=== WAMi Awards ===
The West Australian Music Industry Awards or WAMis are presented annually from 1985 by Western Australian Music Industry Association Inc to recognise local artists.

Year	Nominee / work	Award	Result
2001	"Wake Up"	Most Popular Original Song	Won
2001	"Wake Up"	Most Popular Local Original Music Video	Won
2002	Eskimo Joe	Most Popular Local Original Band	Won
2002	Girl	Most Popular Local Original Album	Won
2005	Eskimo Joe	Best Commercial Pop Act	Won
2005	Eskimo Joe	Best Indie/Pop Act	Won
2005	Eskimo Joe	Most Popular Act	Won
2005	Eskimo Joe	Most Popular Live Act	Won
2005	A Song Is a City	Most Popular Album	Won
2005	"From the Sea"	Most Popular Single or EP	Won
2006	Eskimo Joe	Most Popular Act	Won
2006	Eskimo Joe	Best Commercial Pop Act	Won
2007	"Black Fingernails, Red Wine"	Most Popular Single or EP	Won
2007	Eskimo Joe	Best Commercial Pop Act	Won
2007	Kav Temperley	Best Male Vocalist	Nominated
2007	Eskimo Joe	Most Popular Act	Nominated
2007	Eskimo Joe	Most Popular Live Act	Nominated
2007	Black Fingernails, Red Wine	Most Popular Album	Nominated
2007	"Black Fingernails, Red Wine"	Most Popular Music Video	Nominated
2008	Eskimo Joe	Most Popular Act	Nominated
2008	Eskimo Joe	Best Commercial Pop Act	Nominated
2009	Eskimo Joe	Best Commercial Pop Act	Nominated
2010	Inshalla	Most Popular Album	Nominated
2010	"Foreign Land"	Best Popular Single or EP	Nominated
2010	Eskimo Joe	Best Commercial Pop Act	Won

=== Other awards ===
- 2007 ISC Songwriting Competition (first place in performance) – "London Bombs"
- 2007 ISC Songwriting Competition (second place in rock) – "Black Fingernails, Red Wine"
- 2007 ISC Songwriting Competition (honourable mention in rock) – "New York"

=== Nominations ===
- 2006 Jack Awards, Best Bass Guitarist, Kav Temperley
- 2006 Channel V, Oz Artist of the Year
