= Girl (Eskimo Joe album) =

Studio album by Eskimo Joe
- Released: 20 August 2001
- Recorded: August – November 2000
- Genre: Indie rock
- Length: 37:25
- Label: Modular, Warner
- Producer: Ed Buller & Eskimo Joe

Eskimo Joe chronology
Eskimo Joe (1999)	Girl (2001)	A Song Is a City (2004)

Singles from Girl
- 1. "Wake Up" Released: 26 March 2001; 2. "Who Sold Her Out" Released: 11 June 2001; 3. "Planet Earth" Released: 5 November 2001; 4. "Liar" Released: 4 March 2002

Professional ratings
Review scores
Source	Rating
OZ Music Project	(favourable)
Beat Magazine	(mixed)

Girl is the debut studio album by Australian rock band Eskimo Joe, released on 20 August 2001. The album reached number 29 on the Australian (ARIA) Album Charts and was certified gold.

At the ARIA Music Awards of 2001, the album was nominated for ARIA Award for Breakthrough Artist – Album.

The album features the two heavily played Triple J songs "Wake Up" and "Who Sold Her Out", with the latter reaching number 94 on the ARIA Singles Charts. "Sydney Song" featured on an advertisement for Kit Kat, in which a man carried a novelty sized Kit Kat around, to promote the Kit Kat Chunky. This also assisted in sales of the band's album, Girl.

== Track listing ==
All tracks are written by Eskimo Joe

No.	Title	Length
1.	"Head Hurts"	3:03
2.	"Wake Up"	3:29
3.	"Planet Earth"	3:20
4.	"Who Sold Her Out"	3:10
5.	"Love List"	3:09
6.	"Liar"	3:26
7.	"Election"	2:46
8.	"Take a Rest"	3:25
9.	"Slow Down"	1:37
10.	"Sydney Song"	3:42
11.	"Just like Me"	3:18
12.	"Driver"	3:04

== Charts ==
Chart (2001/02)	Peak position
Australian Albums (ARIA)	29

== Release history ==
Region	Date	Label	Format	Catalogue
Australia	20 August 2001	Modular	CD, digital download	MODCD011
Australia	22 March 2004	Warner, Mushroom	CD	337972
Australia	2018	Mushroom Records	LP	5419797441
