= Sweater (EP) =

EP by Eskimo Joe
- Released: April 1998
- Recorded: 1998
- Genre: Rock
- Length: 15:52
- Label: Troy Horse

Eskimo Joe chronology
| Sweater (1998) | Eskimo Joe (1999) |

Singles from Sweater
- 1. "Sweater" Released: 1998

Sweater is the debut extended play by Australian band, Eskimo Joe, released in April 1998. The EP peaked at number 90 on the ARIA singles chart.

The title track "Sweater" received significant airplay on Australian youth radio station Triple J, reaching #33 on Triple J's Hottest 100 of 1998.

== Track listing ==
All tracks are written by Eskimo Joe

Sweater
| No. | Title | Length |
|---|---|---|
| 1. | "14Hz" | 2:01 |
| 2. | "Sweater" | 2:17 |
| 3. | "Rubber" | 1:59 |
| 4. | "Monkeys" | 0:48 |
| 5. | "Why are All the Cars Outside Real?" | 3:40 |
| 6. | Untitled | 5:07 |

== Charts ==
| Chart (1998) | Peak position |
|---|---|
| ARIA Albums Chart | 90 |

== Release history ==
| Region | Date | Label | Format | Catalogue |
|---|---|---|---|---|
| Australia | April 1998 | Troy Horse | CD | TH021 |
