= Joel Quartermain =

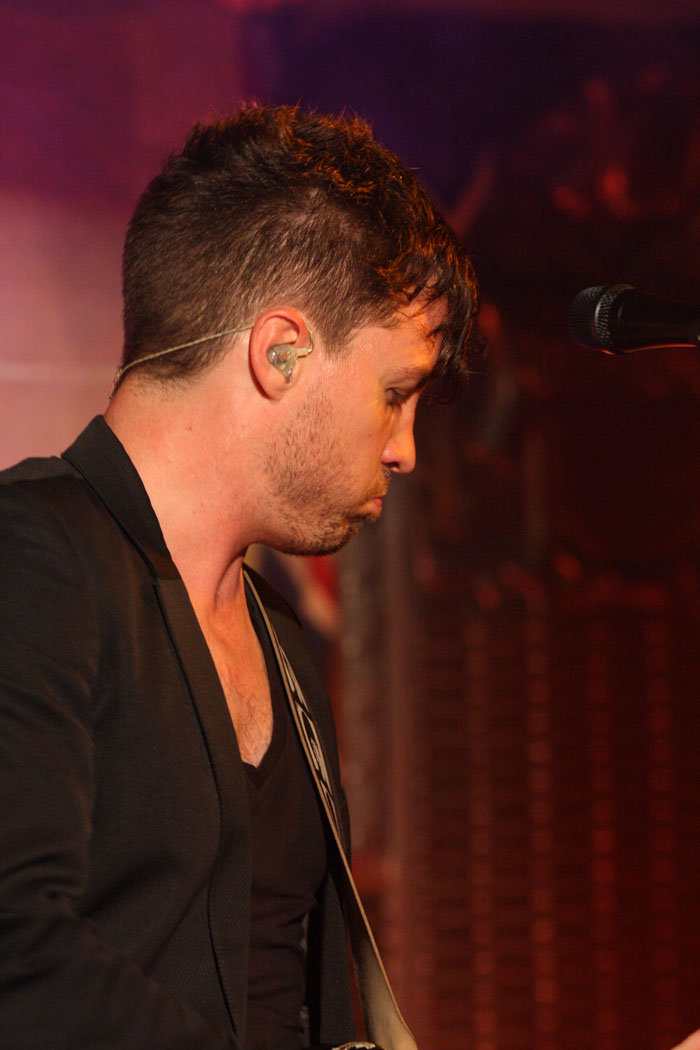
- Quartermain performing at Live At The Chapel in November 2011

Background information
- Birth name: Joel Quartermain
- Born: 19 January 1977 (age 48); Kew, Victoria, Australia
- Genres: Alternative rock
- Occupation(s): Musician, singer, songwriter, drummer, guitarist
- Years active: 1995–present
- Labels: Modular; Festival; Mushroom; Warner; Rykodisc
- Member of: Eskimo Joe

Joel Quartermain (born 19 January 1977) is an Australian guitarist, back-up singer, recording drummer and pianist of the band Eskimo Joe.

== Early life ==
Quartermain spent a lot of his childhood focused on radio and tapes. In 1989, he moved to Perth, Western Australia, where he attended Hollywood Senior High School.

== Music career ==
Quartermain started playing in bands from the age of 12, forming an outfit called Hollywood Boulevard, shifting from keyboards to guitar along the way. This band then evolved into a funk band called Carpet, which consisted of Quartermain on guitar, bassist Simon Leach (Little Birdy) and Simon's brother Stuart on drums . They were subsequently joined by Kavyen Temperley on vocals, changing the name of the band again to Freud's Pillows. As Freud's Pillow they released an EP, Pleasure Puppy in 1997. Despite their modest popularity, Quartermain and Temperley were unhappy with the style of music being played by the band. Quartermain started wearing You Am I T-shirts in protest. Meanwhile, Temperley was jamming on a side project with former school friend Stuart MacLeod, who had co-written some of the songs for Freud's Pillow. The two unsuccessfully auditioned a number of drummers to join them eventually settling on Quartermain, the guitarist in Freud's Pillow, who they concluded was more musical than any other drummers they had auditioned.

We always used to say in interviews that we liked Joel because he couldn't play the drums. Of course he can, but he didn't play drums like a drummer. He wasn't piss-farting around on a high-hat.

— Stuart MacLeod

This side project, now called Eskimo Joe, with MacLeod on guitar, Quartermain on drums and guitar, and Temperley on bass guitar and vocals, played its first public performance in August 1997 at the University of Western Australia in a local heat for the National Campus Band Competition, they proceeded to the state finals in Perth and then the nationals in Sydney.

Quartermain initially played the drums for Eskimo Joe but moved to join on guitars in 2004, with the live drumming position being filled by a number of musicians.

== Awards ==
=== APRA Awards ===
The APRA Awards are presented annually from 1982 by the Australasian Performing Right Association (APRA).

| Year | Nominee / work | Award | Result |
|---|---|---|---|
| 2005 | "From the Sea" (Finlay Beaton, Stuart MacLeod, Joel Quartermain) | Song of the Year | Nominated |
| 2007 | "Black Fingernails, Red Wine " (Stuart MacLeod, Joel Quartermain, Kav Temperley) | Song of the Year | Nominated |
| 2008 | "New York" (Stuart MacLeod, Joel Quartermain, Kav Temperley) | Most Played Australian Work | Nominated |
| 2010 | "Foreign Land" (Stuart MacLeod, Joel Quartermain, Steve Parkin, Kavyen Temperley) – Eskimo Joe | Most Played Australian Work | Won |
| 2010 | "Foreign Land" (Stuart MacLeod, Joel Quartermain, Steve Parkin, Kavyen Temperley) – Eskimo Joe | Rock Work of the Year | Won |
| 2010 | "Foreign Land" (Stuart MacLeod, Joel Quartermain, Steve Parkin, Kavyen Temperley) – Eskimo Joe | Song of the Year | Shortlisted |
| 2012 | "Love is a Drug" (Stuart MacLeod, Joel Quartermain, Kav Temperley) | Rock Work of the Year | Nominated |
| 2012 | "Love is a Drug" (Stuart MacLeod, Joel Quartermain, Kav Temperley) | Song of the Year | Shortlisted |
| 2025 | "The First Time" (Stuart MacLeod, Joel Quartermain, Kav Temperley) | Most Performed Rock Work | Nominated |

=== Vanda & Young Global Songwriting Competition ===
The Vanda & Young Global Songwriting Competition is an annual competition that "acknowledges great songwriting whilst supporting and raising money for Nordoff-Robbins" and is coordinated by Albert Music and APRA AMCOS. It commenced in 2009.

| Year | Nominee / work | Award | Result |
|---|---|---|---|
| 2009 | "Foreign Land" (Kav Temperley, Joel Quartermain and Stuart Macleod) | Vanda & Young Global Songwriting Competition | 2nd |

=== West Australian Music Industry Awards ===
The West Australian Music Industry Awards (WAMIs) are annual awards presented to the local contemporary music industry, put on annually by the Western Australian Music Industry Association Inc (WAM).

| Year | Nominee / work | Award | Result (wins only) |
|---|---|---|---|
| 2016 | Joel Quartermain | Best Record Producer | Won |
