= Stuart MacLeod (musician) =

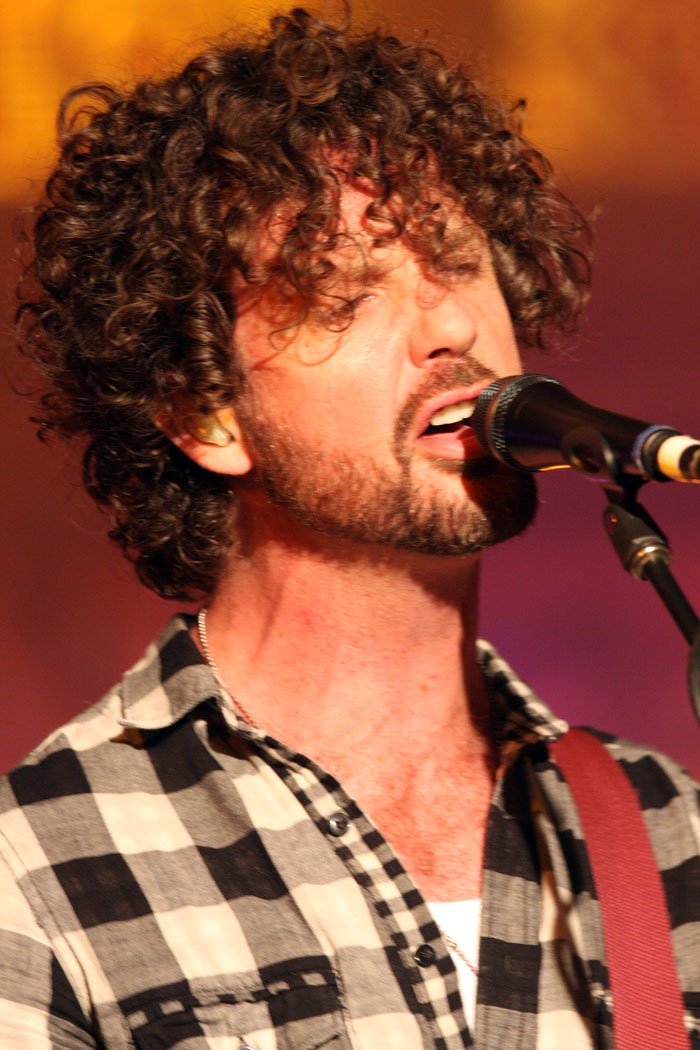

Background information
- Born: Stuart Leslie MacLeod; 10 April 1977 (age 49); Fremantle, Western Australia, Australia
- Genre: Alternative rock
- Occupations: Musician, singer, songwriter, guitarist
- Years active: 1995–present
- Labels: Modular; Festival; Mushroom; Warner; Rykodisc

Stuart Leslie MacLeod (born 10 April 1977) is the guitarist and backup singer of the Australian band, Eskimo Joe. He lives in Fremantle, Western Australia. When he was seven he lived next door to Kavyen Temperley and they have been best friends for years. MacLeod and Temperley attended John Curtin Senior High School together. MacLeod then went on to study Engineering and Commerce at the University of Western Australia. In 1997 MacLeod started jamming with Temperley, who was in a band, Freud's Pillow. MacLeod co-wrote several Freud's Pillow's songs. The pair decided to form a new band and auditioned a few drummers before settling on Joel Quartermain, who was a guitarist in Freud's Pillow, but had mentioned he also played drums. MacLeod and Temperley decided Quartermain was more musical than any other drummer they had auditioned. They then entered the band, Eskimo Joe, into the Australian National Campus Band Competition. The first heat in August 1997 was Eskimo Joe's first performance, they went on to win the state final and then the national competition, the reward being a chance to play at the Livid Festival together with a recording session in Sydney.

MacLeod announced his engagement to his fiancée Gen at the 2005 ARIA Awards and they were married in December 2006. Their children were later born in 2008.

== Equipment ==
Stuart uses various Fender Telecaster guitars, a black Yamaha AES1500B guitar and has used Fender, Vox, and now currently uses Hiwatt and Badcat amplifiers.

=== Current Effects Pedals ===
- Boss TU-2 Chromatic Tuner
- Ibanez TS-808 Tube Screamer (Analog.Man modified)
- Boss GE-7 Graphic Equalizer
- Line 6 DL4 Delay Modeler
- Boss RV-5 Digital Reverb
- Cooper Philosopher Awesomeness pedal (series IV with Gumby mod)

== Awards and nominations ==
=== APRA Awards ===
The APRA Awards are presented annually from 1982 by the Australasian Performing Right Association (APRA).

Year	Nominee / work	Award	Result
2005	"From the Sea" (Finlay Beaton, Stuart MacLeod, Joel Quartermain)	Song of the Year	Nominated
2007	"Black Fingernails, Red Wine " (Stuart MacLeod, Joel Quartermain, Kav Temperley)	Song of the Year	Nominated
2008	"New York" (Stuart MacLeod, Joel Quartermain, Kav Temperley)	Most Played Australian Work	Nominated
2010	"Foreign Land" (Stuart MacLeod, Joel Quartermain, Steve Parkin, Kavyen Temperley) – Eskimo Joe	Most Played Australian Work	Won
2010	"Foreign Land" (Stuart MacLeod, Joel Quartermain, Steve Parkin, Kavyen Temperley) – Eskimo Joe	Rock Work of the Year	Won
2010	"Foreign Land" (Stuart MacLeod, Joel Quartermain, Steve Parkin, Kavyen Temperley) – Eskimo Joe	Song of the Year	Shortlisted
2012	"Love is a Drug" (Stuart MacLeod, Joel Quartermain, Kav Temperley)	Rock Work of the Year	Nominated
2012	"Love is a Drug" (Stuart MacLeod, Joel Quartermain, Kav Temperley)	Song of the Year	Shortlisted
2025	"The First Time" (Stuart MacLeod, Joel Quartermain, Kav Temperley)	Most Performed Rock Work	Nominated

=== Vanda & Young Global Songwriting Competition ===
The Vanda & Young Global Songwriting Competition is an annual competition that "acknowledges great songwriting whilst supporting and raising money for Nordoff-Robbins" and is coordinated by Albert Music and APRA AMCOS. It commenced in 2009.

Year	Nominee / work	Award	Result
2009	"Foreign Land" (Kav Temperley, Joel Quartermain and Stuart Macleod)	Vanda & Young Global Songwriting Competition	2nd
