= Kav Temperley =

Australian musician, singer-songwriter

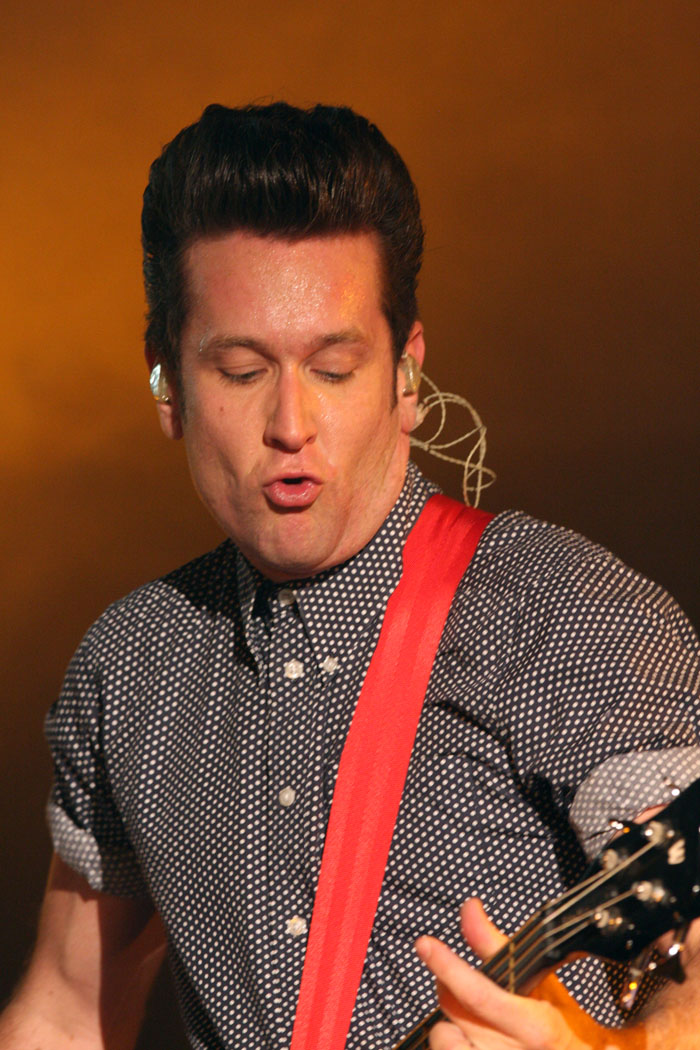
- Temperley performing at Live at the Chapel in November 2011

Background information
- Also known as: Satyam Kavyen Temperley
- Born: Finlay Beaton; 3 July 1978 (age 48); Perth, Western Australia, Australia
- Origin: Fremantle, Western Australia, Australia
- Genre: Alternative rock
- Occupations: Musician, singer, songwriter, bassist
- Years active: 1995–present
- Labels: Modular; Festival; Mushroom; Warner; Rykodisc

Satyam Kavyen "Kav" Temperley (born Finlay Beaton; 3 July 1978) is the lead singer, songwriter, bassist and occasional keyboard player of the Australian band Eskimo Joe.

== Early life and education ==
Temperley was born in Mosman Park, Western Australia, and grew up in Fremantle. At seven years of age, his name was changed to 'Satyam Kavyen Temperley'—Temperley is his mother's maiden name and 'Satyam Kavyen' means "Poet of Truth". The Temperley family were members of the 'Orange People' (Rajneesh movement) and made trips to India and Oregon throughout the early 1980s.

Between the ages of seven and 12, Temperley attended the Lance Holt School, a Fremantle community school. At the age of thirteen, he accompanied his mother on a trip to India, where they stayed at the Osho International Meditation Resort in Pune. It was during this trip that he enrolled an international alternative boarding school in Devon called Ko Hsuan that is based on the teachings of controversial Indian mystic Osho. Temperley was accepted as a boarder and remained at the school for a year:

That was an amazing place, musically. They had a really good music room. If we had two periods of math, in between we'd run off and jam for 10 minutes. We'd come back and be totally chilled because we'd gotten all that nervous energy out of our systems.

Temperley referred to his time at Ko Hsuan as his "saving grace", and it was there that he discovered a passion for music before he returned to Fremantle and John Curtin High School due to homesickness:

Then I thought I was going to become an actor until I started wagging school and writing songs.

== Musical career ==
At the age of seventeen, Temperley met future band member Joel Quartermain during a musical performance by the latter at Temperley's high school. At the time, Temperley was already friends with Stuart MacLeod, as they were neighbours since the age of 6.

At the age of eighteen, Temperley returned to England in an attempt to re-kindle friendships with his former classmates at Ko Hsuan. He subsequently returned to India, where he again stayed at Pune. While in India, Temperley decided to become more serious about his music. In a letter to MacLeod, he states

When I get back, I really think we should turn this into something serious, because we've got some good stuff going on.

Upon his return to Fremantle, Temperley informed Quartermain of his decision; at the time, Quartermain was playing in funk metal band Freud's Pillow. While at university, Temperley, MacLeod and Quartermain formed Eskimo Joe for a Battle of the Bands competition. Initially, Temperley had written a number of folk-type and power pop songs, and he later revealed the band's thinking at the time:

If we write four more of them we can win the campus band competition! So that's exactly what we did, and for a while thanks to radio play of a song called "Sweater", we wallowed in the world of power pop. Funnily enough, it wasn't until Girl, our debut album, that we returned to the sort of songs we had intended to do at the beginning, the sort of songs that had inspired that letter to Stu. Once we found that sound though, we never looked back.

Temperley sang a reinterpreted version of the song "To Look at You", with INXS, on the 2010 cover version album Original Sin.

In September 2016, Temperley released his debut solo four-track EP Hope Street.

In August 2018 Temperley announced his debut solo record All Your Devotion, self-described as "a collection of ruminating, thoughtful and affecting songs".

In October 2022, Temperley released his second studio album, Machines of Love and Grace.

== Other activities ==
A National Office for Live Music was launched by Australian Prime Minister Kevin Rudd in July 2013 and, as of August 2013, Temperley is the state ambassador for Western Australia.

In 2015, Temperley curated for APRA song hub.

In 2016, he created production Songs From The Suburbs, Songs From The Sea for Fremantle Festival.

In 2017, he composed and produced "The Shower Song" for water awareness.

=== Mentor and educator ===
Since 2015, Temperley and (more recently) his partner Beth Ivers have been running songwriting workshops for teens and emerging musicians around the country. Temperley is passionate about the craft of songwriting.

Temperley is also the co-founder (again with partner Beth) of On a Boat Productions, a production house where they create, produce and educate in creative content.

== Personal life ==
Temperley and his ex-wife Abeni Dara are parents of two children.

Temperley lives with his wife Beth Ivers in Fremantle,. They live with his two sons, and Ivers' two daughters.

== Discography ==
=== Albums ===
List of solo albums
Title	Details
All Your Devotion	Released: 28 September 2018; Label: Kav Temperley, Inertia Recordings; Format: CD, LP, digital download
Machines of Love and Grace	Released: 19 October 2022; Label: Kav Temperley; Format: CD, digital download

=== Extended plays ===
List of EPs
Title	Details
Hope Street	Released: 9 September 2016; Label: Inertia Recordings; Format: digital download

== Awards and nominations ==
=== APRA Awards ===
The APRA Awards are presented annually from 1982 by the Australasian Performing Right Association (APRA).

Year	Nominee / work	Award	Result
2005	"From the Sea" (Finlay Beaton, Stuart MacLeod, Joel Quartermain)	Song of the Year	Nominated
2007	"Black Fingernails, Red Wine " (Stuart MacLeod, Joel Quartermain, Kav Temperley)	Song of the Year	Nominated
2008	"New York" (Stuart MacLeod, Joel Quartermain, Kav Temperley)	Most Played Australian Work	Nominated
2010	"Foreign Land" (Stuart MacLeod, Joel Quartermain, Steve Parkin, Kavyen Temperley) – Eskimo Joe	Most Played Australian Work	Won
2010	"Foreign Land" (Stuart MacLeod, Joel Quartermain, Steve Parkin, Kavyen Temperley) – Eskimo Joe	Rock Work of the Year	Won
2010	"Foreign Land" (Stuart MacLeod, Joel Quartermain, Steve Parkin, Kavyen Temperley) – Eskimo Joe	Song of the Year	Shortlisted
2012	"Love is a Drug" (Stuart MacLeod, Joel Quartermain, Kav Temperley)	Rock Work of the Year	Nominated
2012	"Love is a Drug" (Stuart MacLeod, Joel Quartermain, Kav Temperley)	Song of the Year	Shortlisted
2025	"The First Time" (Stuart MacLeod, Joel Quartermain, Kav Temperley)	Most Performed Rock Work	Nominated

=== Vanda & Young Global Songwriting Competition ===
The Vanda & Young Global Songwriting Competition is an annual competition that "acknowledges great songwriting whilst supporting and raising money for Nordoff-Robbins" and is coordinated by Albert Music and APRA AMCOS. It commenced in 2009.

Year	Nominee / work	Award	Result
2009	"Foreign Land" (Kav Temperley, Joel Quartermain and Stuart Macleod)	Vanda & Young Global Songwriting Competition	2nd
