= Augie March discography =

- Studio albums: 7
- EPs: 3
- Singles: 17
- Video albums: 1

The discography of Augie March, an Australian indie rock band, formed in 1996, consists of seven studio albums, three extended plays and seventeen singles.

== Albums ==
=== Studio albums ===
Title	Details	Peak chart positions	Certifications
Title	Details	AUS	Certifications
Sunset Studies	Released: November 2000; Label: Ra Records, BMG (74321799892); Format: CD, digital download	35	
Strange Bird	Released: October 2002; Label: Ra Records, BMG (74321968652); Format: CD, digital download	34	
Moo, You Bloody Choir	Released: March 2006; Label: Sony Music Australia (82876785592); Format: CD, digital download	10	ARIA: Platinum
Watch Me Disappear	Released: October 2008; Label: Sony Music Australia (88697394282); Format: CD, digital download	4	
Havens Dumb	Released: October 2014; Label: Augie March (AMCD005/AMLP005); Format: CD, LP, digital download	14	
Bootikins	Released: February 2018; Label: Caroline Australia (AMCD006/AMLP006); Format: CD, LP, digital download	20	
Bloodsport & Porn	Released: December 2021; Label: self-released; Format: CD, LP, digital download		
Malagrotta	Released: October 2024; Label: Self-released; Format: CD, LP, digital download		

=== Video albums ===
Title	Details
Drones & Vapid Ditties	Released: 6 September 2004; Label: BMG (82876640919); Format: DVD

== Extended plays ==
Title	Details	Peak chart positions
Title	Details	AUS
Thanks for the Memes	Released: 1998; Label: Ra Records, BMG (74321564372); Format: CD	-
Waltz	Released: August 1999; Label: Ra Records, BMG (74321689972); Format: CD	76
Live at the Playroom	Released: 4 September 2007; Label: BMG; Format: DD	-

== Singles ==
List of singles, with year released, selected chart positions, and album shown
Title	Year	Peak chart positions	Album
Title	Year	AUS	Album
"Asleep an Perfection"	1999	—	Waltz
"The Mothball"	1999	—	Waltz
"The Hole in Your Roof"	2000	56	Sunset Studies
"Heartbeat and Sails"	2000	—	Sunset Studies
"There Is No Such Place"	2001	-	Sunset Studies
"Here Comes the Night"	2001	72	Sunset Studies
"The Vineyard"	2002	31	Strange Bird
"Little Wonder"	2003	75	Strange Bird
"One Crowded Hour"	2006	29	Moo, You Bloody Choir
"The Cold Acre"	2006	-	Moo, You Bloody Choir
"Pennywhistle"	2008	-	Watch Me Disappear
"Farmer's Son"	2009	-	Watch Me Disappear
"After the Crack Up"	2014	-	Haven's Dumb
"A Dog Starved"	2014	-	Haven's Dumb
"Never Been Sad"	2015	-	Haven's Dumb
"Bootikins"	2018	-	Bootikins
"Henry Lee" (with Romy Vager)	2023	-	non album single
