= The Cold Acre =

Single by Augie March

from the album Moo, You Bloody Choir
- Released: 2006
- Genre: Rock
- Label: Sony BMG Australia
- Songwriter: Glenn Richards
- Producers: Eric Drew Feldman, Paul McKercher, Augie March

Augie March singles chronology
| "One Crowded Hour" (2006) | "The Cold Acre" (2006) | "Pennywhistle" (2008) |

"The Cold Acre" is a song by Australian band Augie March. It was released in 2006 as the second and final single from the band's third studio album, Moo, You Bloody Choir.

In Bernard Zuel's review of the album, he described how the song's "lyrics fill me with wonder. From a homeless man facing death with equanimity ('And when I go my bones will know/ to pick up and follow the wagon that rolls on the cold acre')." Robert Forster describes the lyrics as "beautiful lines, and they talk to each other." Billboard Magazine described the song as "gentle and poppy, layered with piano and harmonies".

At the ARIA Music Awards of 2007 the music video for "Cold Acre", directed by Ben Saunders and Germain McMicking, was nominated for Best Video.

In February to March 2007 the group undertook a nationwide Cold Acre Tour to support the single and its album. In March 2015 the song's writer, Glenn Richards, jokingly told an enthusiastic audience member, "You can have it... It makes me about 50 cents a year in APRA cheques. Just wash my windows once a week and it's yours."

== Music video ==
The landscape of the video is set in a vast open forest as lead singer Richards is rolling a boulder along a track. Along the way he ventures through a cleared section of the forest, where logged trees are noticed. He then comes across various people (the other band members) lending him a hand to push the boulder up a slope. At the top of the track, legs emerge from this boulder, which then flees from the band members, running down the slope.

== Track listing ==
1. "The Cold Acre" - 5:38
