= Paul McKercher =

- Origin: Hobart, Tasmania, Australia
- Genres: Pop, rock
- Occupation(s): Producer, engineer, teacher
- Instrument(s): Guitar, cello
- Years active: 1991–present
- Website: paulmckercher.com

Paul McKercher is an Australian record producer, audio engineer, sound mixer and multi-instrumentalist. He has received five ARIA Artisan Awards and has produced over 50 albums. McKercher has worked with Australian artists Josh Pyke, Bertie Blackman, Papa vs Pretty, Sarah Blasko, You Am I, Pete Murray, Motor Ace and Eskimo Joe. An avowed analogue fan, he specialises in the use of tape, although he also uses digital technologies.

== Biography ==
Paul McKercher worked at national youth radio station, Triple J, for three years. In 1991 he and fellow audio engineer John Jacobs created the "JJJ News Theme" as a mix of McKercher's guitar playing, a scratch of N.W.A.'s "Fuck tha Police" and the orchestral ABC News theme, "Majestic Fanfare", with the beat based on Prince's "Gett Off". McKercher followed with seven years at ABC radio. He has also worked as a free-lance record producer, engineer and mixer since 1992. For three weeks in 1993 McKercher recorded indie pop group Falling Joys' third studio album Aerial (August 1993). Using three different eight-track machines, at an isolated house in Kangaroo Valley, he captured the band live-in-the-studio.

In late 1997 Kercher was working at Woodstock Studios, Melbourne on pop rock band the Jaynes' extended play Dogbone (April 1998). He has written articles for Audio Technology Magazine. McKercher's techniques were discussed by Zolton Zavos in May 2000 in part one of "Making Tracks" in Tharunka on his work at Megaphon Studios, Petersham. Zavos acknowledged his "wonderful ear" when he worked as a producer, engineer and multi-instrumentalist.

In 2010 he addressed the Face the Music Conference. As from December 2016 he was a teacher at SAE Institute, Sydney delivering classes on "how to produce recordings" as well as continuing as a producer, engineer and mixer.

== List of technical works ==
Year	Artist(s)	Work	Role(s)	Ref.
1991	Triple J	"JJJ News Theme" (with John Jacobs)	Mixer, guitar	
1992	DAZYchains	Daze of Our Lives (EP)	Producer	
1992	Glide	Shuffle Off to Buffalo (EP)	Producer	
1992	The Apartments	Drift	Producer, engineer	
1993	Clouds	Thunderhead	Producer, remastering	
1993	Various artists	In Defence of Animals	Engineer	
1993	Falling Joys	Aerial	Producer	
1994	Various artists	Jabberjaw Compilation	Engineer	
1995	The Apartments	A Life Full of Farewells	Producer, mixer	
1995	The Cruel Sea	Three Legged Dog	Producer, engineer, backing vocals	
1995	Tumbleweed	Galactaphonic	Producer, engineer	
1996	Magic Dirt	Friends in Danger	Producer, engineer, mixer	
1996	Hoodoo Gurus	In Blue Cave	Engineer	
1996	Spiderbait	Ivy and the Big Apples	Producer	
1996	You Am I	Hourly, Daily	Engineer, cello	
1996	Tumbleweed	Return to Earth	Producer	
1997	Pollyanna	Hello Halo	Producer, mixer	
1997	Screamfeeder	Closing Alaska (EP)	Engineer	
1997	Fini Scad	"Furious"	Producer	
1997	Sidewinder	Tangerine	Producer	
1998	The Cruel Sea	Over Easy	Producer	
1998	The Jaynes	Dogbone (EP)	Producer	
1998	Primary	Vicious Precious (EP)	Producer	
1998	Hoodoo Gurus	Bite the Bullet	Engineer	
1998	The Superjesus	Sumo	Engineer, mixer	
1998	Cold Chisel	The Last Wave of Summer	Engineer	
1999	Screamfeeder	Kitten Licks	Engineer	
2000	Testeagles	Non Comprehendus	Producer	
2000	Augie March	Sunset Studies	Producer, mixer, acoustic guitar	
2000	Midnight Oil	The Real Thing	Engineer	
2001	You Am I	Dress Me Slowly	Engineer	
2001	Motor Ace	Five Star Laundry	Engineer, mixer	
2002	Augie March	Strange Bird	Producer	
2002	Monique Brumby	Signal Hill	Producer	
2002	You Am I	Deliverance	Producer	
2002	Knievel	The Name Rings a Bell That Drowns out Your Voice	Cello	
2002	Speedstar	Bruises You Can Touch	Producer	
2003	Motor Ace	Shoot This	Engineer, mixer	
2003	Pete Murray	Feeler	Producer	
2003	The Anyones (Note: For the US market The Anyones (and their 2003 self-titled album) were renamed as the Everyones due to a naming conflict with Los Angeles band Anyone. Consequently AllMusic has the release as The Everyones by the Everyones, in 2004.)	The Anyones	Engineer, mixer	
2004	Eskimo Joe	A Song Is a City	Producer, engineer	
2004	Butterfly 9	Butterfly 9	Mixer	
2004	Hoodoo Gurus	Mach Schau	Engineer	
2004	Little Birdy	BigBigLove	Producer, engineer, mixer	
2005	Motor Ace	Animal	Engineer	
2005	Jimmy Barnes	Double Happiness	Producer, engineer, mixer	
2005	Daughterboy Jao	Simple Matters	Producer, engineer, mixer, effects, piano, Fender Rhodes	
2005	Gear	The Gear (EP)	Producer, mixer	
2005	Paul Greene	Reset	Producer, engineer	
2006	Augie March	Moo, You Bloody Choir	Producer, engineer, mixer	
2006	Sarah Blasko	What the Sea Wants, the Sea Will Have	Engineer	
2006	The Cops	80 in the Shade	Producer	
2007	Something for Kate	The Murmur Years	Engineer	
2008	Josh Pyke	Chimney's Afire	Producer, engineer, mixer	
2008	Melanie Horsnell	Complicated Sweetheart	Producer, mixer, guitar	
2008	Kara Grainger	Grand and Green River	Producer, mixer	
2008	Chasing Bailey	Long Story Short	Producer, mixer	
2009	Jen Cloher & the Endless Sea	Hidden Hands	Producer	
2011	Sierra Fin	Cautionary Tale of the Beautiful Blackout	Producer, engineer, mixer	
2011	Papa vs Pretty	United in Isolation	Producer, engineer	
2011	Bayonets for Legs	The Coloured Air (EP)	Mixer	
2014	The Vines	Wicked Nature	Producer, mixer	
2014	Augie March	Havens Dumb	Mixer	
2014	Andy Bull	Sea of Approval	Engineer, mixer	
2015	Art vs. Science	Off the Edge of the Earth and Into Forever, Forever	Engineer, mixer	
2015	Sarah Belkner	Humans (EP)	Vocals producer	
2017	The Go Set	One Fine Day	Engineer	

== Awards and nominations ==
=== ARIA Music Awards ===
Year	Nominee / work	Award	Result	Ref.
1995	himself	Engineer of the Year	Won	
1995	himself	Producer of the Year	Nominated	
1996	You Am I – Hourly, Daily	Engineer of the Year	Won	
2001	Augie March – Sunset Studies	Engineer of the Year	Won	
2001	Augie March – Sunset Studies	Producer of the Year	Nominated	
2003	Pete Murray – Feeler	Engineer of the Year	Nominated	
2003	Pete Murray – Feeler	Producer of the Year	Nominated	
2004	Eskimo Joe – A Song Is a City	Engineer of the Year	Won	
2004	Eskimo Joe – A Song Is a City	Producer of the Year	Won	
2004	Pete Murray – "So Beautiful"	Producer of the Year	Nominated	
2005	Little Birdy – BigBigLove	Engineer of the Year	Nominated	
2005	Little Birdy – BigBigLove	Producer of the Year	Nominated	
2005	Eskimo Joe – "Older Than You"	Engineer of the Year	Nominated	
2005	Eskimo Joe – "Older Than You"	Producer of the Year	Nominated	
2006	Augie March – various tracks on Moo, You Bloody Choir	Engineer of the Year	Nominated	
2006	Augie March – various tracks on Moo, You Bloody Choir	Producer of the Year	Nominated	
2007	Sarah Blasko – What the Sea Wants, the Sea Will Have	Engineer of the Year	Nominated	
2014	Andy Bull – Sea of Approval	Engineer of the Year	Nominated	
2022	Ball Park Music – Weirder & Weirder	Mix Engineer – Best Mixed Album	Nominated	
