= Pennywhistle (Augie March song) =

Single by Augie March

from the album Watch Me Disappear
- Released: 27 September 2008
- Genre: Rock
- Length: 3:50
- Songwriter: Glenn Richards

Augie March singles chronology
"The Cold Acre'" (2006)	"Pennywhistle" (2008)	"Watch Me Disappear" (2008)

"Pennywhistle" is a song by Australian band Augie March. It was released in September 2008 as the lead single from the band's fourth studio album, Watch Me Disappear.

It peaked at No. 37 on the ARIA Top 100 Physical Singles Chart.

Scott Podmore of The Herald Sun reviewed Watch Me Disappear and found that "Pennywhistle" was an "escape into the musical gaiety."

Kathy McCabe of The Daily Telegraph felt that "the band are determined to make a star out of the instrument", the pennywhistle. She reported that Richards was inspired to write the song by a Celtic whistle sample, while Edmondo Ammendola added "God forbid we change the pennywhistle for a recorder or a bassoon; there will be outrage."

== Music video ==
The music video was filmed along the shores of Avalon Beach, Victoria on 5 September 2008, directed by Ben Saunders. The first half of the video shows lead singer Richards riding a bicycle through a secluded waterfront neighbourhood whilst saluting the locals.

The band's drummer, David Williams, is cheerfully showing his skills on a pennywhistle whilst going alongside Richards for a few metres, only to then be pushed and chased by Richards until knocked to the ground. We see Williams on his knees, holding his lower stomach area in pain.

After placing his bicycle next to a shed, he appears with the rest of the band members, continuing down the road whilst simultaneously playing instruments.

Towards the end of the song, we see the locals dancing in unison to the music, walking off into the distance.
