= Live at the Playroom =

Live at the Playroom may refer to:

- Live at the Playroom (Airbourne album), a 2004 live EP by 'Airbourne' released by Roadrunner Records
- Live at the Playroom (Kate Miller-Heidke EP), a 2007 EP by 'Kate Miller-Heidke' released by Sony
- Live at the Playroom (Kisschasy album), a 2007 EP by 'Kisschasy' released by Below Par
- Live at the Playroom (album), a 2007 EP by 'Evermore' released by Warner; see Evermore discography
- Live at the Playroom (album), a 2007 EP by 'Augie March' released by BMG; see Augie March discography
- Live at the Playroom (album), a 2007 EP by 'Sarah Blasko' released by Dew Process; see Sarah Blasko discography

== See also ==
- Live at the Playroom '84 (album), a 2008 EP by 'Jimmy Barnes' released by Liberation Music; see Jimmy Barnes discography
- Playroom (disambiguation)
