= Neil Davis (cameraman) =

Australian combat cameraman (1934–1985)

- Born: Neil Brian Davis; 14 February 1934; Hobart, Tasmania, Australia
- Died: 9 September 1985 (aged 51); Bangkok, Thailand
- Cause of death: Shrapnel
- Occupations: Cameraman, photojournalist
- Years active: 1961–1985
- Spouse: Chou Ping (Julie) Yen (m. 1977)

Neil Brian Davis (14 February 1934 – 9 September 1985) was an Australian combat cameraman who was recognised for his work as a photojournalist during the Vietnam War and other conflicts in the region. He was killed in Bangkok on 9 September 1985, while filming a minor Thai coup attempt.

== Early life ==
Davis was born in Hobart, Tasmania, and raised on farms in Nala and Sorell. He attended Sorell High School and later Hobart High. He quit school at age 15 to work in the Tasmanian Government Film Unit. He joined the Australian Broadcasting Commission (ABC) in 1961 as a cine-cameraman, but he left in December 1963 to accept an offer to become Visnews's cameraman and correspondent for Southeast Asia. He was based in Singapore.

== War correspondent ==
In early 1964 Davis went to Borneo to cover the Indonesia–Malaysia confrontation. Shortly afterwards Davis made his first visits to Vietnam and Laos. Although he reported from across Asia, he is best remembered for his long association with, and reporting on, the war in Indo-China.

Unusual among foreign correspondents, Davis chose to film the war from the South Vietnamese perspective, shooting acclaimed combat footage on many occasions and acquiring a reputation for skill and luck. He was driven by the desire to obtain the best film he could and was well known for his neutrality, crossing, on one occasion, to film from the Viet Cong side. Davis's main preoccupation was with filming the effects of war and combat on individuals. His neutrality notwithstanding, Davis earned the ire of United States military authorities, but this did not stop American news networks seeking out his film.

During the Tet Offensive in early 1968, Davis covered action in Saigon and Huế. It was during his period in Huế that Davis crossed path with Brigadier General Nguyễn Ngọc Loan. Davis recalls that on meeting Nguyễn Ngọc Loan he "lifted his arm to which he had strapped a machine pistol, pointed it at me and said 'Some day I kill you'". While apparently shocking, Davis knew this was not true and really a reference to events that had occurred earlier during the offensive.

Between 1970 and 1975 Davis spent increasing amounts of time in Cambodia and he moved to Phnom Penh in 1971. He was severely wounded on several occasions, once almost losing a leg, but was fit and determined enough to recover and continue his work. In June 1973 Davis left Visnews and became a freelancer. In April 1975, Davis chose to leave Phnom Penh with the American helicopter evacuation. Joined by NBC News Correspondent Jim Laurie, he flew to Vietnam to cover the final stage of the war. On 30 April, Davis filmed as North Vietnamese troops and T-54 tank number 834 famously broke through the gates to the Presidential Palace in Saigon. This image, which has long remained a symbol of the American failure to stop communism in Vietnam, was first broadcast on an NBC News Special Report: Communist Saigon narrated by Laurie on 26 May 1975.

After Vietnam, Davis based himself in Bangkok, Thailand, but he travelled to cover stories in Angola, Sudan, Uganda and Lebanon. In 1978 he was briefly imprisoned in Syria, accused of spying for Israel.

== Death ==
After nearly 20 dangerous assignments on the battlefronts, Neil Davis was killed in Bangkok on 9 September 1985, while filming a minor Thai coup attempt that ended after only a few hours. Davis and his American soundman Bill Latch were covering an Army radio tower that had been seized. A tank manned by pro-coup troops protected the entrance gate to the tower. Davis set up his camera facing the tank and got ready to deliver his report. Without warning, the tank fired a round in their direction. Davis and Latch were fatally wounded by shrapnel. Davis died instantly, and his camera fell to the ground, still running. The last scene his camera recorded was the dying Latch crawling for cover.

Latch, a former missionary, had reservations working with Davis. He feared Davis's recklessness would some day be his undoing, according to a colleague from Voice of America. Davis also had his own reservations; always meticulous in the care and maintenance of his equipment, he had privately questioned Latch's ability to meet his standards. Davis had always worked by himself in dangerous situations, preferring not to make life-and-death decisions for others. But for the last six years of his life, he was tethered to a sound man "to shoulder the heavy battery and cassette pack, linked to the nine-kilogram camera by a video cable".

== Commemoration ==
In 1986, Davis was posthumously entered into the TV Week Logies Hall of Fame.

His work has been commemorated in the documentary Frontline by David Bradbury and in Tim Bowden's biography One Crowded Hour, which takes its title from a verse by Thomas Osbert Mordaunt: "One crowded hour of glorious life is worth an age without a name", a line that Davis wrote in the front of each of his work diaries. The award-winning Augie March song "One Crowded Hour" was composed by Glenn Richards while he was reading One Crowded Hour.

== Literary depiction ==
Christopher Koch's 1995 novel Highways to a War centres on a photo journalist resembling Neil Davis. Koch's protagonist is fearless and reports on the war by following local troops rather than western ones.
