= 2006 ARIA Music Awards =

Annual Australian music awards ceremony

- Date: 29 October 2006
- Venue: Acer Arena, Sydney, New South Wales

Highlights
- Most wins: Bernard Fanning (4); Eskimo Joe (4)
- Most nominations: Eskimo Joe (9)
- Website: ariaawards.com.au

Television/radio coverage
- Network: Network Ten

The 20th annual Australian Recording Industry Association Music Awards (generally known as the ARIA Music Awards or simply the ARIAs) were held on 29 October 2006 at the Acer Arena at the Sydney Olympic Park complex. Presenters on the night included James Mathison, Johnny Knoxville, Jesse McCartney and John Mayer.

== Axle Whitehead controversy ==
Video Hits host Axle Whitehead exposed himself and simulated masturbation on an ARIA trophy as the winners of the awards for Highest Selling Single and Highest Selling Album made their way to the stage in front of an audience of up to 10,000. The incident was edited from the telecast of the awards. Whitehead announced three days after the awards that he had resigned from Network Ten.

== Awards and nominations ==
Winners are highlighted in bold, other final nominees shown in plain.

=== ARIA Awards ===
- Album of the Year
  - **Bernard Fanning** – **Tea and Sympathy**
    - Augie March – Moo, You Bloody Choir
    - Eskimo Joe – Black Fingernails, Red Wine
    - The Sleepy Jackson – Personality – One Was a Spider, One Was a Bird
    - Wolfmother – Wolfmother
- Single of the Year
  - **Eskimo Joe** – "**Black Fingernails, Red Wine**"
    - Augie March – "One Crowded Hour"
    - Bernard Fanning – "Watch Over Me"
    - Wolfmother – "Mind's Eye"
    - Youth Group – "Forever Young"
- Best Female Artist
  - **Clare Bowditch** – **What Was Left**
    - Holly Throsby – Under the Town
    - Jade MacRae – Jade MacRae
    - Jen Cloher – Dead Wood Falls
    - Kasey Chambers – "Nothing at All"
- Best Male Artist
  - **Bernard Fanning** – **Tea and Sympathy**
    - Ben Lee – "We're All in This Together"
    - Bob Evans – Suburban Songbook
    - Dan Kelly & the Alpha Males – Pirate Radio
    - Pete Murray – See the Sun
- Best Group
  - **Wolfmother** – **Wolfmother**
    - Augie March – Moo, You Bloody Choir
    - Eskimo Joe – Black Fingernails, Red Wine
    - Rogue Traders – Here Come the Drums
    - The Living End – State of Emergency
- Highest Selling Album
  - **Human Nature** – **Reach Out: The Motown Record**
    - Bernard Fanning – Tea and Sympathy
    - Pete Murray – See the Sun
    - Rogue Traders – Here Come the Drums
    - The Veronicas – The Secret Life Of...
- Highest Selling Single
  - **TV Rock** featuring **Seany B** – "**Flaunt It**"
    - Kate DeAraugo – "Maybe Tonight"
    - Lee Harding – "Wasabi"
    - Shannon Noll – "Shine"
    - Youth Group – "Forever Young"
- Best Breakthrough Artist – Album
  - **Wolfmother** – **Wolfmother**
    - Hilltop Hoods – The Hard Road
    - Rogue Traders – Here Come the Drums
    - The Grates – Gravity Won't Get You High
    - The Veronicas – The Secret Life Of...
- Breakthrough Artist – Single
  - **Youth Group** – "**Forever Young**"
    - Gyroscope – "Fast Girl"
    - Hilltop Hoods – "Clown Prince"
    - Sneaky Sound System – "I Love It"
    - TV Rock featuring Seany B – "Flaunt It"
    - Starky – "Hey Bang Bang"
- Best Adult Contemporary Album
  - **Bob Evans** – **Suburban Songbook**
    - Human Nature – Reach Out: The Motown Record
    - Tex, Don and Charlie – All Is Forgiven
    - The Whitlams – Little Cloud
    - Various Artists – She Will Have Her Way: The Songs of Tim & Neil Finn
- Best Blues & Roots Album
  - **The Audreys** – **Between Last Night and Us**
    - Bernard Fanning – Tea and Sympathy
    - Lior – Doorways of My Mind
    - The Flood – The Late Late Show
    - Xavier Rudd – Food in the Belly
- Best Children's Album
  - **The Wiggles** – **Racing to the Rainbow**
    - Hi-5 – Wish Upon a Star
    - Justine Clarke – I Like to Sing!
    - The Fairies – Fairy Magic
    - The Hooley Dooleys - Smile
- Best Comedy Release
  - **Lano and Woodley** – **Sing Songs**
    - Carl Barron – Whatever Comes Next DVD
    - Matt Tilley – Cereal Pest
    - The Shambles – Best of Series One & Two
- Best Country Album
  - **Troy Cassar-Daley** – **Brighter Day**
    - Adam Brand – What a Life
    - Anne Kirkpatrick – Showman's Daughter
    - Catherine Britt – Too Far Gone
    - Lee Kernaghan – The New Bush
- Best Dance Release
  - **TV Rock** featuring **Seany B** – **Flaunt It**
    - Dirty South – Dirty South EP
    - Paul Mac – Panic Room
    - Sneaky Sound System – "I Love It"
    - The Presets – Beams
- Best Independent Release
  - **Hilltop Hoods – The Hard Road**
    - Ben Lee – "We're All in This Together"
    - Gotye – Like Drawing Blood
    - The John Butler Trio – Live at St. Gallen
    - Lior – Doorways of My Mind
- Best Music DVD
  - **Eskimo Joe** – **Eskimo Joe**
    - Hilltop Hoods – The Calling Live
    - Kylie Minogue – Showgirl: The Greatest Hits Tour
    - Missy Higgins – If You Tell Me Yours, I'll Tell You Mine
    - The Go-Betweens – That Striped Sunlight Sound
- Best Pop Release
  - **The Veronicas** – **The Secret Life of...**
    - Ben Lee – Into the Dark EP
    - Josh Pyke – Feeding the Wolves
    - Rogue Traders – Here Come the Drums
    - Shannon Noll – Lift
- Best Rock Album
  - **Wolfmother – Wolfmother**
    - Augie March – Moo, You Bloody Choir
    - Eskimo Joe – Black Fingernails, Red Wine
    - The Living End – State of Emergency
    - You Am I – Convicts
- Best Urban Release
  - **Hilltop Hoods** – **The Hard Road**
    - Bliss n Eso – "Up Jumped the Boogie"
    - Jade MacRae – Jade MacRae
    - Phrase – Talk with Force
    - Weapon X & Ken Hell – Sneakerpimpin' Ain't Easy

=== Artisan Awards ===
- Best Cover Art
  - **Debaser** – **Bernard Fanning** - **Tea and Sympathy**
    - Alison Smith, Chris Cheney – The Living End – State of Emergency
    - Dane Lovett, Dave Snow – Eskimo Joe – Black Fingernails, Red Wine
    - Luke Steele, James Bellesini, Love Police – The Sleepy Jackson - Personality – One Was a Spider, One Was a Bird
    - The Grates – The Grates – Gravity Won't Get You High
- Best Video
  - **Head Pictures** – **Bernard Fanning** – "**Wish You Well**"
    - Andy Cassell – Youth Group – "Forever Young"
    - Bart Borghessi – Eskimo Joe – "Black Fingernails, Red Wine"
    - Kim Moyes – The Presets – "Are You the One"
    - Sean Gilligan, Sarah-Jane Woulahan – The Living End – "Wake Up"
- Engineer of the Year
  - **Matt Lovell** – **Eskimo Joe** – **Black Fingernails, Red Wine**
    - Adam Rhodes – The Cat Empire – Cities: The Cat Empire Project
    - Nick Launay – The Living End – State of Emergency
    - Paul McKercher – Augie March – various tracks on Moo, You Bloody Choir
    - Wayne Connolly – The Vines – Vision Valley
- Producer of the Year
  - **Eskimo Joe** – **Eskimo Joe**– **Black Fingernails, Red Wine**
    - Lindsay Gravina, Magic Dirt – Magic Dirt – Snow White
    - Nick Launay – The Living End – State of Emergency
    - Paul McKercher – Augie March – various tracks on Moo, You Bloody Choir
    - Wayne Connolly – Youth Group – Casino Twilight Dogs

=== Fine Arts Awards ===
- Best Classical Album
  - **Richard Tognetti** – **Bach Sonatas and Partitas for Solo Violin**
    - Amelia Farrugia – Joie De Vivre
    - Nikki Vaskilakis, Tasmanian Symphony Orchestra, Sebastian Lang-Lessing – Mendelssohn, Bruch, Ravel
    - Simon Tedeschi, The Queensland Orchestra, Richard Bonynge – Piano Concertos: Tchaikovsky, Grieg
    - Slava Grigoryan, Leonard Grigoryan – The Queensland Orchestra – Brett Kelly – Rodrigo Guitar Concertos
- Best Jazz Album
  - **The Necks** – **Chemist**
    - Don Burrows, The Mell-O-Tones, Phillip Sametz – Non-Stop Flight – Great Music of the Swing Era
    - James Muller – Kaboom
    - Mark Sholtez – Real Street
    - Paul Grabowsky, Bernie McGann – Always
- Best Soundtrack / Cast / Show Recording
  - **Paul Kelly**, **Dan Luscombe**, **Katie Brianna** & the **Stormwater Boys** – **Jindabyne Soundtrack**
    - David Bridie – RAN Soundtrack
    - Francois Tetaz – Wolf Creek Original Motion Picture Soundtrack
    - Nick Cave, Warren Ellis – The Proposition
    - Various – Little Fish Soundtrack
- Best World Music Album
  - **The Cat Empire** – **Cities: The Cat Empire Project**
    - Joseph and James Tawadros – Visions
    - Mara! – Sorella
    - The Pigram Brothers – Under the Mango Tree
    - Seaman Dan – Island Way

== Hall of Fame inductees ==
The following artists were inducted into the ARIA Hall of Fame on 16 August 2006, which was broadcast on 20 August:

- Daddy Cool inducted by singer-songwriter, Tim Finn
- Divinyls inducted by actor, Hugh Jackman
- Icehouse inducted by singer-songwriter, Tim Freedman
- Lobby Loyde inducted by bandmate, Billy Thorpe
- Helen Reddy inducted by actor, Toni Collette
- Rose Tattoo inducted by musician, Sarah McLeod

Inducted on 29 October:

- Midnight Oil inducted by Irish singer-songwriter, Bono

== Performers ==
The following artists performed on stage during the 2006 ARIA Awards:

- Wolfmother
- Eskimo Joe
- The Veronicas
- Human Nature
- Hilltop Hoods
- Silverchair
- Youth Group
- Pete Murray (featuring John Mayer)
- Bernard Fanning (featuring Kasey Chambers and Clare Bowditch)

== Channel V Oz Artist of the Year award ==
- Channel V Oz Artist of the Year
  - Wolfmother
    - Eskimo Joe
    - Rogue Traders
    - The Veronicas

== See also ==
- Australian music
- Australian rock
