= Little Wonder (Augie March song) =

Single by Augie March

from the album Strange Bird
- Released: May 2003
- Recorded: 2002
- Genre: Rock
- Label: BMG Australia
- Songwriter(s): Glenn Richards

Augie March singles chronology
"The Vineyard" (2002)	"Little Wonder" (2003)	"One Crowded Hour" (2006)

"Little Wonder" is a song by Australian rock band Augie March. The song was released as the second and final single from their second studio album Strange Bird. The peaked at number 75 on the ARIA Charts.

The song's clip, directed by Ben Saunders and produced by Nice Trees, was based on the strange but true story of a man who encased himself and swam in a fish suit in Toolondo Lake in western Victoria, Australia, where he lived in solitude. The story came from the May 1996 issue of the Fortean Times. The clip won Best Video from a Major Record Company at the St. Kilda Film Festival.

== Charts ==
Chart (2003)	Peak position
Australian (ARIA Charts)	75
