= Sunset Studies =

Studio album by Augie March
- Released: 30 October 2000
- Recorded: 1999–2000
- Genre: Indie rock
- Length: 76:10
- Label: BMG Australia
- Producer: Richard Pleasance, Paul McKercher, Augie March

Augie March chronology
Waltz (1999)	Sunset Studies (2000)	Strange Bird (2002)

Singles from Album
- 1. "The Hole in Your Roof" Released: 2000; 2. "Heartbeat and Sails" Released: 2000; 3. "There Is No Such Place" Released: 2001; 4. "Here Comes the Night" Released: 2001

Professional ratings
Review scores
Source	Rating
Allmusic	link
The Australian	3.5/5 stars
The Age	4/5 stars
Herald Sun	4.5/5 stars

Sunset Studies is the debut studio album by the Australian indie rock band Augie March. It was released in October 2000 in Australia by BMG.

The album was recorded over the course of a year in five studios with three separate producers.

At the ARIA Music Awards of 2001, the album was nominated for four awards, winning Engineer of the Year.

== Track listing ==
(All songs by Glenn Richards, arranged by Augie March except where noted)

1. "The Hole in Your Roof" – 7:12
2. "Maroondah Reservoir" – 5:05
3. "There Is No Such Place" – 3:17
4. "Tulip" – 6:20
5. "Tasman Awakens" – 4:42
6. "Believe Me" – 2:02
7. "Sunset Studies" – 5:34
8. "Men Who Follow Spring The Planet 'Round" (traditional motif, Richards, Augie March) – 5:35
9. "Angels of the Bowling Green" – 5:12
10. "Heartbeat And Sails" – 3:01
11. "The Offer" – 4:56
12. "The Good Gardener (On How He Fell)" – 5:26
13. "Here Comes The Night" – 4:50
14. "Asleep in Perfection" – 4:04
15. "Owen's Lament" – 8:46

== Charts ==
Chart (2000)	Peak position
Australian Albums (ARIA)	35

== Personnel ==
- Glenn Richards – guitars, vocals, piano, keys, percussion, drums ("There Is No Such Place"), drum programming, banjo, dobro, samples
- Edmond Ammendola – bass, piano, percussion, electric guitar, piano accordion
- David Williams – drums, piano accordion, percussion, keyboards, backing vocals ("The Hole in Your Roof")
- Adam Donovan – guitar, backing vocals ("The Hole in Your Roof"), pedal steel, hammond organ, piano, keyboards, percussion, tape machine, samples

=== Additional personnel ===
- Alex Parlas – trumpet ("The Good Gardener")
- Rob Dawson – piano, backing vocals ("There Is No Such Place"), organ, piano ("The Offer")
- Cameron Reynolds – clarinet ("Tulip")
- Tim Neill – hammond organ ("Here Comes the Night")
- Paul McKercher – acoustic guitar ("Heartbeat and Sails")
- Gerasimos Grammenos – percussion ("Tasman Awakens")
- Naomi Evans – violin ("Men Who Follow")
- Richard Pleasance – dobro, backing vocals ("Men Who Follow")
