= One Crowded Hour =

2006 single by Augie March

Single by Augie March

from the album Moo, You Bloody Choir
- Released: 3 April 2006
- Length: 4:16
- Label: Sony BMG Australia; Jive
- Songwriter: Glenn Richards
- Producer: Eric Drew Feldman

Augie March singles chronology
"Little Wonder" (2003)	"One Crowded Hour" (2006)	"The Cold Acre" (2006)

"One Crowded Hour" is a song by Australian indie rock band Augie March written by Glenn Richards. The song was released in April 2006 as the first single released from their third studio album, Moo, You Bloody Choir. In 2025, the song was voted 34 in the Triple J Hottest 100 of Australian Songs.

The song had been played by both the band and acoustically by frontman, Glenn Richards, for upwards of two years before the album was finally released.

== Details ==
The song's title comes from a poem by Thomas Osbert Mordaunt.

During the band's appearance on the live music TV show Cold: Live At The Chapel, Richards revealed the song was written while he was housesitting for Deborah Conway, and was inspired by, and named after, a book she owned about an Australian wartime photographer Neil Davis. Richards has said, "Deborah has a wonderful collection of records and books. She was on holidays, so I was looking after the house and taking advantage of all that. I was also listening to a lot of early Bob Dylan, which would explain the chord progression."

The song was picked up and played by radio station Triple J then later by Nova, giving the song more radio exposure. During its original chart run in 2006, the song reached number 33 on the ARIA Singles Chart. In January 2007, the song was ranked No. 1 on the Triple J Hottest 100 of 2006. Following its win, the track re-entered the ARIA chart at number 29, its peak, the next month.

In 2013, Australian singer Taylor Henderson recorded a version for his album Taylor Henderson.

== Reception ==
In June 2007, the song won Song of the Year at the Australian Performing Rights Association Awards. The song was voted at No. 59 on the Triple J Hottest 100 of All Time in 2009. It was also voted No. 24 on the Triple J Hottest 100 20 Years countdown.

Rolling Stone Australia noted the, "Twisting, romantic wordplay that is at turns both clever and earnest—it was upon penning this chorus Augie March would create a timeless pop song. The kind that hangs around like ether in our collective consciousness; somehow we know the words without trying—as if they were planted in a dream."

== Music video ==
The video clip for "One Crowded Hour" is set in a gloomy forest where Richards and the band perform. Plastic animals like deer and bears are seen passing by the band. The clip's atmosphere is very dreary and mysterious, represented by the band's clothes, instruments and the sky in grey.

== Awards and nominations ==
=== APRA Awards ===
The APRA Awards are presented annually by the Australasian Performing Right Association (APRA).

Year	Nominee / work	Award	Result
2007	"One Crowded Hour" – Glenn Richards	Song of the Year	Won

== Track listing ==
Australian maxi-CD

1. "One Crowded Hour" (single mix) – 4:16
2. "There Is No Such Place" (acoustic version) – 3:06
3. "Passed Out in Clarkefield" – 4:34
4. "Asleep in Perfection" (acoustic version) – 4:26
5. "Clockwork" (acoustic version) – 4:05

== Charts ==
Chart (2007)	Peak position
Australia (ARIA)	29
