= Adam Donovan (musician) =

Australian musician

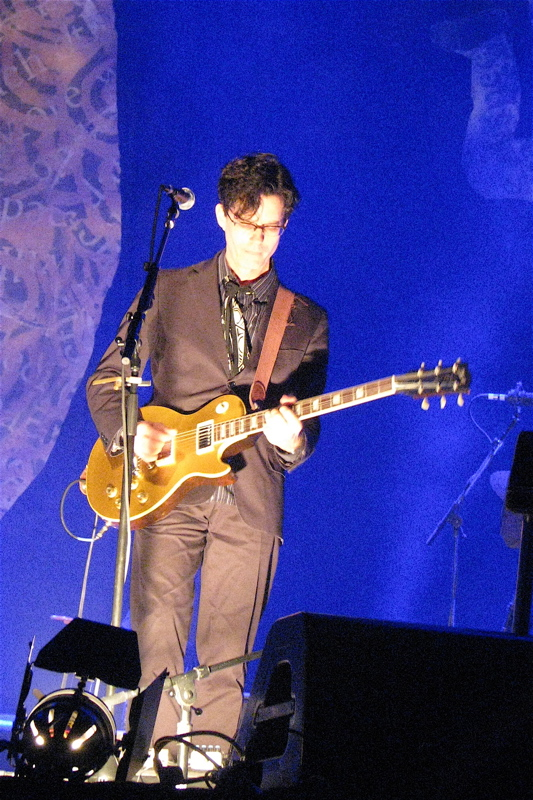
- Donovan playing with Augie March; 8 November 2007

Background information
- Born: Shepparton, Victoria, Australia
- Genres: Indie rock, pop rock
- Occupation: Musician
- Instruments: Guitar, vocals
- Formerly of: Augie March

Adam Donovan is an Australian musician and audio engineer. He was a founding member and lead guitarist of the Australian indie rock band Augie March from its formation in the 1990s until his departure in 2026. In addition to guitar, Donovan contributed a range of instruments and production work to the band's recordings.

He was born in Shepparton, Victoria, and grew up with future Augie March members Glenn Richards and David Williams, with Donovan and Williams living in neighbouring houses. and attended St Brendan's Primary School, Shepparton and Notre Dame High School, Shepparton.

He attended a music course at Northern Melbourne Institute of TAFE along with fellow Augie March founding members Edmondo Ammendola and David Williams.
