= The Go Set =

Australian punk rock band

- Origin: Geelong, Victoria, Australia
- Genres: Punk rock; folk punk; Celtic punk
- Years active: 2003–present
- Members: Justin Keenan; Lachlan McSwain; Brendon "Shorty" Lee; Joel Colliver; Tommy Collins; Troy Scott
- Past members: see Members
- Website: thegoset.com

The Go Set are an Australian punk rock band, who were formed in 2003 in Geelong by founding mainstays Justin Keenan, on vocals and guitar, and Mark Moran on bass guitar. By 2017 they had released seven studio albums and toured Australia, Europe, New Zealand and Japan.

== History ==
The Go Set were formed in Geelong in 2003 by lead singer-songwriter and guitarist, Justin Keenan, and bass guitarist, Mark Moran. Keenan is the owner of Karvin Records, which is a Melbourne-based talent management, PR company and record label. He had been a member of Melbourne-based garage rockers, Eddie Would Go, which formed in 1996 and released three albums before disbanding in 2001.

Their debut album, Sing a Song of Revolution (2005), was produced by Lindsay Gravina at Melbourne's Birdland Studios. This album fuses traditional folk influences with 1970s punk rock. Shite 'n' Onions' Will Swan observed, "[they] first marched into view, all bagpipes and tattered banners and bandaged heads held high, with 2005’s Sing a Song of Revolution, an exciting and accessible collection of emigrant anthems and mandolin-spiked drinking music."

The Go Set's second album, The Hungry Mile (2006), was produced by Radio Birdman front man Rob Younger. It provided the singles "Davey", "Union Man" and "Power of Youth". Alongside Keenan and Moran, the line-up was Andrew Baxter on guitar and mandolin, Ben Cuthbert on drums, and Johnny "Rotten" McHaggis on bagpipes. From March to June the group undertook their Hungry Mile Tour across Australia and to New Zealand.

In November 2011 The Go Set worked with Australian rock producer Paul McKercher on their 6th album, recorded at Hothouse Studios in St Kilda, Melbourne. The self-titled album features the single 'Drums of Chelsea' and was released in March 2012. In the following month Keenan told Chris Yates of The Music, of their proposed tour, "If you said to any other musician, you're going to Europe for a month, you're playing every night, you're playing eight different countries, you're playing at five festivals where you're gonna be playing to thousands of people, dudes would be climbing over each other to get on that flight!"

During August 2013 they supported a tour by the Real McKenzies, with BMA's Rory McCartney observing, "[their] fusion of punk with bagpipes, kilts, tin whistles, and even a mandolin might seem an odd mix... [however] the five-piece has had 13 different members over the years. Touring takes its toll on families and the band has a revolving line-up." McCartney reflected on the group's song writing, "Like its sound, the band's lyrical material has also been heavily influenced by the members' heritage. Keenan's parents were very left-leaning. This made him serious about music and wanting to leave a legacy people could connect to, one that rises above popular culture."

== Members ==
Current members

- Justin Keenan - Vocals, guitar
- Brendon “Shorty” Lee - Bass
- Lachlan McSwain - Bagpipes, tin whistle
- Joel Colliver - Guitar
- Tommy Collins - Guitar, mandolin, upright bass
- Troy Scott - Drums
- Paul Redfern - Violin

Former members

- Fidel (Paul) Monk - Guitar, mandolin
- Andrew Baxter-Smith - Guitar, mandolin
- Jesse Beaton - Guitar, mandolin
- Mark McCartney - Guitar, mandolin
- Lee Hartney - Guitar
- Ben Cuthbet - Drums
- Dave Foley - Drums
- Chris Cowburn - Drums
- Mark Moran - Bass
- Tom Fisher - Bass
- Evan Young - Bass
- Johnny - Bagpipes
- Tommy Collins - Upright bass, guitar
- Chad Blaster - Drums

== Discography ==
=== Studio albums ===
Year	Title	Track list
2004	Sing a Song of Revolution	1. "1788"; 2. "Old Dark Brown"; 3. "Wandering Man"; 4. "Sing Me a Song"; 5. "5am" 6. "Raymond O'Byrne"; 7. "Breakdown"; 8. "Away Away" (Weddings Parties Anything); 9. "Fade"; 10. "Coming Down"; 11. "MacPherson's Rant"; 12. "The Panda / Gravel Walk" (Secret track)
2006	The Hungry Mile	1. "Jig of Slurs"; 2. "Bordeaux"; 3. "Davey"; 4. "Tale of a Convict"; 5. "Salamanca"; 6. "All the Truth and Lies"; 7. "Union Man"; 8. "The Hardness of His Hand"; 9. "The Power of Youth"; 10. "Scarlet Snow"; 11. "Learning Slowly"; 12. "The Longest Holiday"; 13. "Bombs Falling"; 14. "Scots Wha' Ha'e" (The Real McKenzies)
2007	A Journey for a Nation	1. "Fortune and Gold"; 2. "The Rising Tide"; 3. "The New Minority"; 4. "Swings and Roundabouts"; 5. "Bakery Hill"; 6. "Sheppards Town"; 7. "Catching the Sun"; 8. "Oceans of Blue"; 9. "A Story to Tell"; 10. "Welcome to the World"; 11. "Waiting for the Great Leap Forwards" (Billy Bragg); 12. "Journey of a Thousand Miles"
2008	Rising	1. "The Miner's Son"; 2. "North of the 23"; 3. "Portland 3:15"; 4. "Fifty Four"; 5. "Roaring Forties"; 6. "Armentieres"; 7. "A Black and White Picture"; 8. "Eastside Burning"; 9. "Believers"; 10. "Together Again"; 11. "New Race" (Radio Birdman)
2011	The Go Set	1. "Drums of Chelsea"; 2. "The New Age"; 3. "Television Education"; 4. "All Our Friends"; 5. "Speakers Distort"; 6. "Halfway to Hell"; 7. "Rooftops"; 8. "Change the World"; 9. "December"; 10. "Liberty Bell"; 11. "Belfast Mill
2015	Rolling Sound	1. The Rise and the Fall; 2. Bones; 3. Seven Years; 4. The Struggle and the Fight; 5. In the Streets; 6. Rolling Sound; 7. Raise a Glass; 8. Punkfest Night; 9. Tojo Bombs; 10. Holdfast; 11. The Last March; 12. Libertines
2017	One Fine Day	

=== Extended plays ===
Year	Title	Track list
2003	Welcome to the New Dimension	1. "Hey Good Morning"; 2. "New Dimension"; 3. "1,2,3,4"; 4. "Standing Out in the Rain"
2011	Fallen Fortunes	1. "The New Age"; 2. "December"; 3. "Halfway to Hell"; 4. "Point Me Into the Sun"; 5. "December (Slow Version)"
2020	Of Bright Futures	1. "A Letter to My Government"; 2. "Cold Water"; 3. "Treasures"; 4. "Mixed Tapes"; 5. "Days of Ghosts"; 6. "Palomino"; 7. "Floating"
2020	... and Broken Pasts	1. "Empires"; 2. "1981"; 3. "Sleepy Little Town"; 4. "Hannah and the Rain"; 5. "When the Winter Ends"; 6. "The Captain's Daughter"

=== Live albums ===
- Another Round in Melbourne Town (2010)
