= Moo, You Bloody Choir =

Studio album by Augie March
- Released: 11 March 2006
- Recorded: November 2004–June 2005
- Studios: Sing Sing, Melbourne; Hyde Street Studios, San Francisco; Woodstock Studios, Melbourne; Second World Studios, Victoria
- Genres: Indie rock, indie pop, indie folk
- Length: 66:10
- Labels: Sony BMG Australia, Jive
- Producers: Eric Drew Feldman, Paul McKercher, Augie March

Augie March chronology
Strange Bird (2002)	Moo, You Bloody Choir (2006)	Watch Me Disappear (2008)

Singles from Moo, You Bloody Choir
- 1. "One Crowded Hour" Released: 3 April 2006; 2. "The Cold Acre" Released: 2006

Professional ratings
Review scores
Source	Rating
AllMusic	3/5 stars
The A.V. Club	B
IGN	8.3/10
MusicOMH	3.5/5 stars
Pitchfork	7.5/10
PopMatters	9/10
The Skinny	3/5 stars
The Sydney Morning Herald	(not rated)

Moo, You Bloody Choir is the third studio album by the Australian indie rock band Augie March. It was released in 2006 in Australia by BMG. It entered the ARIA album charts at #10 and was nominated for Album of the Year at the ARIA Music Awards of 2006, losing to Tea & Sympathy by Bernard Fanning.

The album was re-released 19 May 2007 with a bonus CD of live and unreleased tracks. The 2006 version of "There Is No Such Place" features an orchestra.

The title comes directly from the lyrics of "The Honey Month".

== Reception ==
At the ARIA Music Awards of 2006, the album was nominated for five awards. It also won the Australian Music Prize in 2006. At the J Award of 2006, the album was nominated for Australian Album of the Year.

In October 2010, Moo, You Bloody Choir was listed in the top 50 in the book, 100 Best Australian Albums. In 2011, the album featured at number 93 on the Triple J Hottest 100 Australian Albums of All Time.

The lead single, "One Crowded Hour" peaked on the ARIA singles chart at #29 and was voted #1 on the Triple J Hottest 100 chart.

Named the 98th best Australian album by Rolling Stone Australia in 2021, they said, "a gorgeous, ambitious album layered with storytelling and poetry, Augie March setting the scene carefully as if they were directors of a play. Moo, You Bloody Choir is filled with character studies and surreal imagery—of bandits and hangings, of rivers with eyes, of those in search of something larger than themselves."

== Track listing ==
(All songs by Glenn Richards)

1. "One Crowded Hour" – 4:50
2. "Victoria's Secrets" – 4:47
3. "The Cold Acre" – 5:38
4. "Stranger Strange" – 5:17
5. "Mother Greer" – 3:46
6. "The Honey Month" – 4:52
7. "Just Passing Through" – 5:26
8. "Thin Captain Crackers" – 3:39
9. "Bottle Baby" – 4:28
10. "Mt. Wellington Reverie" – 3:44
11. "The Baron of Sentiment" – 5:10
12. "Bolte and Dunstan Talk Youth" – 4:58
13. "Clockwork" – 6:51
14. "Vernoona" – 2:44

Reissue with bonus CD:

1. O Song (Live at Kings Park, Perth)
2. One Crowded Hour (Live at Kings Park, Perth)
3. Men Who Follow Spring The Planet 'Round (Live at Kings Park, Perth)
4. The Honey Month (Live at Kings Park, Perth)
5. Lady Time (Live at Kings Park, Perth)
6. This Train Will Be Taking No Passengers (Live at Kings Park, Perth)
7. The Brothel Creeper
8. There Is No Such Place (2006 Version)
9. The Keepa (Live at Northcote Social Club)
10. Just Passing Through (Live at Kings Park, Perth)
11. Stranger Strange (Live at the Zoo, Brisbane)
12. The Baron of Sentiment (Live at the Zoo, Brisbane)

== Charts ==
Chart (2006)	Peak position
Australian Albums (ARIA)	10

== Certifications ==
Region	Certification	Certified units/sales
Australia (ARIA)	Platinum	70,000^{^}
^{^} Shipments figures based on certification alone.

== Personnel ==
- Glenn Richards - vocals, guitars, keyboards
- Edmondo Ammendola - bass guitar
- Adam Donovan - guitar, keyboards
- Kiernan Box - keyboards
- David Williams - drums, percussion

=== Additional personnel ===
- Ben Gillespie - trombone
- Chris Tanner - clarinet
- Eugene Ball - trumpet
- Julien Wilson - tenor saxophone
- Miki Tsunoda - violin
- Andrea Keeble - violin
- Matthew Tompkins - violin
- Esther Michel - sleigh bells
