= Jim Laurie =

American writer, journalist and broadcaster

James Andrew Laurie is an American writer, journalist, and broadcaster who is known principally for his work in Asia.

== Education ==
Laurie graduated from the American University in Washington D.C. in 1973 with a degree in History and a certificate in Asian Studies. He underwent his postgraduate studies at George Washington University's Sino-Soviet Institute in 1973 to 1974, under Professor Gaston Sigur.

== Career ==
Laurie started a freelance career in the early 1970s as a radio stringer in Vietnam and Cambodia and writing for the Far Eastern Economic Review. In 1972, Laurie joined NBC News in Saigon to cover the wars in Vietnam and Cambodia. In 1975, with cameraman Neil Davis, he covered the final phase of the Communist take over of Vietnam on April 30, remaining 26 days in the newly renamed Ho Chi Minh City. His work in Vietnam in 1975 for NBC News earned him the George Foster Peabody Award from the University of Georgia.

Laurie reported for ABC News from 1978 through 1999.

In 1980, his reporting in Vietnamese-occupied Cambodia resulted in a one-hour ABC News Close Up documentary This Shattered Land.

In 1981, while working for ABC News, Laurie established the first American television network bureau in China. Later, he reported from Beijing during the Tiananmen Square student protests and subsequent crackdown of May–June 1989.

Other assignments for ABC News included being part of the entourage of Filipino opposition leader Senator Ninoy Aquino as he returned to the Philippines in August 1983 after three years of self-imposed exile in the United States (witnessing the senator's eventual assassination at the tarmac of the Manila International Airport), the coverage of Mikhail Gorbachev and Boris Yeltsin in Russia from 1988 to 1991, the war in Bosnia 1992-1993, the elections in South Africa in 1994, the famine and US Marine operations in Somalia in 1995, and the continued conflict with Saddam Hussein when Laurie reported from Baghdad in the aftermath of the first Gulf War.

In 1999, Laurie left active television news reporting and turned to television management for the News Corporation owned Asia network STAR Group Ltd.

Laurie has co-produced, written, and narrated a number of television documentaries and long form broadcasts. They include ABC News Close-up Japan: Myths Behind the Miracle, 1981, China: The Yellow River, 1988, Cambodia: Boom Town, 1999 (an ABC News Nightline special), and Vietnam: Giaiphong 25 years later; (a one-hour Focus Asia special on News Corporation's STAR World Channel) 2000.

From September 2005 to December 2011, Laurie served as Director of the broadcast journalism department of the Journalism and Media Studies Centre, the University of Hong Kong. In 2005 he also founded Focus Asia Productions Limited, a Hong Kong–based consulting and production company. He has provided consulting services to international TV News organizations, including television channels in India, Qatar, Malaysia, and China.

In 2020, Laurie authored a book entitled "The Last Helicopter: Two Lives in Indochina," a memoir of his earliest days in Asia beginning in 1970.

== Awards ==
In addition to the Peabody Award cited above, Laurie is the recipient of an Overseas Press Club Award for his 1984 reporting in the Philippines, two Emmy Awards, an Armstrong Award, and an Amnesty International Media Award for human right reporting.
