= Non Comprehendus =

Non-Comprehendus

Studio album by Testeagles
- Released: 27 February 2000
- Recorded: 1999
- Studio: Krell Studios, Adelaide
- Genre: Nu metal, rap rock, alternative rock
- Length: 43:18
- Label: Krell/Epic/Sony
- Producer: Paul McKercher

Testeagles chronology
Friends (1998)	Non-Comprehendus (2000)

Singles from Non Comprehendus
- 1. "Turn That Shit Up" Released: 1999; 2. "Underdog" Released: 1999; 3. "Like No Other" Released: 2000

Non-Comprehendus is the debut album from the South Australian rock band Testeagles, which was released on 27 February 2000. It reached No. 8 on the ARIA Albums Chart. It provided two singles, "Turn that Shit Up" (July 1999), which reached No. 54 on the ARIA Singles Chart, and "Underdog" (October). The album was produced by Paul McKercher (You Am I, Spiderbait) with mixing by American producer-engineer, Ulrich Wild (Prong, Pantera, White Zombie, Grinspoon).

Australian musicologist Ian McFarlane described the album as, "a heavy-duty mix of alterna-metal riff-rock, squalling sound effects, experimental electronic beats and samples, [the album] was certainly the most visceral album to chart in the Australian Top 10 since the likes of Nine Inch Nails and Marilyn Manson." The tracks received attention on national youth radio, Triple J, with "Turn that Shit Up" listed on Triple J Hottest 100, 1999 at No. 66.

The band were dropped by their label, Sony, soon after the album was released.

== Track listing ==
No.	Title	Length
1.	"TE's in Style"	1:47
2.	"Underdog"	3:09
3.	"Hammerdrill"	3:45
4.	"Turn That Shit Up"	3:11
5.	"Rebel"	2:29
6.	"Just Another Pop Song"	4:04
7.	"Non-Comphrehendus"	3:17
8.	"Agent 99"	3:07
9.	"Renegade"	1:30
10.	"Ocean"	4:22
11.	"Clone"	3:11
12.	"Like No Other"	4:25
13.	"Dream Is Your Time"	4:54

== Charts ==
Chart performance for Non Comprehendus
Chart (2000)	Peak position
Australian Albums (ARIA)	8
