= Strange Bird =

Studio album by Augie March
- Released: 14 October 2002 (AUS); 14 September 2004 (US)
- Genre: Indie rock
- Length: 62:16
- Labels: BMG Australia spinART

Augie March chronology
Sunset Studies (2000)	Strange Bird (2002)	Moo, You Bloody Choir (2006)

Strange Bird is the second studio album by the Australian indie rock band Augie March. It was first released on 14 October 2002 in Australia by BMG and was re-released in the United States on 14 September 2004 by spinART.

Strange Bird followed from the success of the band's moderately successful first album, Sunset Studies, which was voted as one of the best albums of 2000 by listeners of national Australian radio network Triple J. Strange Bird was quite a departure for the band, replacing the often mellow melodies of the first album with a more expansive, direct sound.

== Background ==
Augie March formed in 1996, when four TAFE and university students formed a band led by English student Glenn Richards. They released two EPs; Thanks for the Memes and Waltz. Waltz received some industry recognition through nominations at the 2000 ARIA Music Awards, but neither EP was a mainstream success. Nonetheless Augie March were offered a contract with BMG. In 2000, Rob Dawson joined the band as a pianist, and the band recorded their debut album, Sunset Studies. The album was lauded by critics and ARIA but not by the general public. In January 2001, as the band were looking to work on a follow-up, Dawson was killed in a car crash. Keyboardist Kiernan Box was brought in to replace him.

== Recording and production ==
Strange Bird was written in an abandoned telephone company building in Preston, a suburb of Melbourne. Unlike Sunset Studies, which was produced by Paul McKercher and Richard Pleasance, Augie March chose to produce Strange Bird independently; drummer Dave Williams explained to Beat that the band was so comfortable working together in the studio that they felt confident producing the album themselves. Recording sessions took place at Melbourne's Sing Sing Studios and Sydney's Megaphon and Big Jesusburger studios. Two tracks—"O Mi Sol Li Lon" and "Sunstroke House"—appeared on the album in their demo form.

== Music and lyrics ==
Richards began writing songs for Strange Bird shortly after Dawson's death, and the event was heavy on his mind throughout the writing process. Richards argued the album was optimistic despite being often described as miserable, pointing to the humorous treatment of the subject of death in numerous songs on the album. Pitchfork Media's Joe Tangari suggested the listener place the lines "Onward and on to the ends of love/ Pricked vanity, habit and ruse/ Onward and on to a premature silence/ Where death finds too much use" from "This Train Will Be Taking No Passengers" in the context of Dawson's recent death to obtain a greater understanding of their meaning.

"The Vineyard", the first single from Strange Bird, was released on 16 September 2002. The song features Box' piano throughout and was described by BMG Australia as a "slice of delicious pop". The song received a common response to Augie March songs, with Impress's Jayson Argall writing that if he "was at pains to try and define the song or decipher its meaning, then maybe [his] attention would be better directed elsewhere". Guitarist Adam Donovan felt similarly, but with the consolation that "I've got a long time to live with it... I'm going to let it unravel as I listen to it more and more".

The titular "Strange Bird" is mentioned directly in both "the Keepa" and "This Train Will Be Taking No Passengers", and many other songs feature bird imagery in their lyrics.

== Reception ==
Professional ratings
Review scores
Source	Rating
Allmusic	4.5/5 stars
Crawdaddy!	(favorable)
Pitchfork Media	(8.2/10)
Rolling Stone	(favorable)

The album was acclaimed upon release by critics. Triple J listeners voted "This Train Will Be Taking No Passengers" to number #66 in the 2002 Triple J Hottest 100 poll.

== Track listing ==
All tracks written by Glenn Richards.

1. "The Vineyard" – 5:01
2. "This Train Will Be Taking No Passengers" – 4:30
3. "Little Wonder" – 4:03
4. "The Night Is a Blackbird" – 5:22
5. "O Mi Sol Li Lon" – 1:21
6. "Song in the Key of Chance" – 4:53
7. "Up the Hill and Down" – 0:22
8. "There's Something at the Bottom of the Black Pool" – 4:19
9. "Addle Brains" – 5:29
10. "The Keepa" – 5:40
11. "The Drowning Dream" – 4:37
12. "Sunstroke House" – 5:17
13. "Brundisium" – 6:48
14. "O Song" – 4:26

== Charts ==
Chart (2002)	Peak position
Australian Albums (ARIA)	34

== Personnel ==
Augie March

- Adam Donovan
- David Williams
- Edmondo Ammendola
- Glenn Richards
- Kiernan Box

Additional musicians

- Matthew Habben – saxophone on tracks 8 and 14, clarinet on 13
- Ken Gardner – trumpet on 3, 8 and 14
- Adam Hutterer – trombone on 8
- Naomi Evans – violin on 6 and 13
