= Katie Brianna =

Australian singer songwriter

- Born: Katie Brianna Garfoot; 26 July 1988 (age 38)
- Origin: Elermore Vale, New South Wales, Australia
- Genres: Alt-country; rock; power pop; Americana
- Occupation: Musician
- Instruments: Vocals; guitar
- Years active: 2002–present
- Labels: Independent/MGM; Stanley
- Website: katiebrianna.om

Katie Brianna Garfoot (born 26 July 1988) is an Australian musician and singer-songwriter-guitarist who performs as Katie Brianna. Previously an alt-country performer she expanded her repertoire to include rock and power-pop.

Paul Kelly invited Brianna to provide vocals on a track for the soundtrack to drama film, Jindabyne (2006). Brianna, Kelly, Dan Luscombe and the Stormwater Boys won the 2006 ARIA Award for Best Original Soundtrack, Cast or Show Album. As a solo artist she has issued three studio albums, Dark Side of the Morning (March 2013), Victim or the Heroine (August 2016) and This Way or Some Other (March 2021).

== Biography ==
Katie Brianna Garfoot, was born on 26 July 1988 as the youngest of five children. She grew up in Elermore Vale, New South Wales (a suburb of Newcastle), played clarinet at primary school and sang in choirs in both primary and secondary schools. After leaving Lambton High School at the beginning of Year 11, she started a Business Administration correspondence course. Outside of her music career, Brianna has undertaken various jobs: waitress, office worker, retailer and CD packer. In July 2004 she attended the Tamworth Camerata, a six-day "junior country music school" held at Tamworth, New South Wales under the guidance of the Country Music Association of Australia (CMAA).

The artist issued her debut four-track extended play, Katie Brianna in December 2005, which was produced by Bill Chambers at his The Boneyard Studio in March. Chambers also provided acoustic slide guitar, dobro, electric guitar, mandolin and vocal harmony; he was joined in the studio by James Gillard on acoustic guitars, bass guitar, upright bass, percussion, viola and harmony vocals; and Mick Albeck on fiddle. One of the EP's tracks, "The Devil Came Back for You", was a finalist in the 2005 International Songwriting Competition in the Teen category.

After hearing her EP, Paul Kelly invited Brianna to provide vocals on a track, "Jindabyne Fair", for the soundtrack to the drama film, Jindabyne (2006). "Jindabyne Fair" was issued as a single, Russell Marks of The Monthly described it as "A slow country-folk song" and listed it at No. 135 out-of 403 songs written by Kelly. At the 2006 ARIA Awards Brianna, Kelly, Dan Luscombe and the Stormwater Boys won Best Original Soundtrack, Cast or Show Album. Early in 2007 she relocated to the Blue Mountains.

The artist deliberately took a break from performing and recording, due to "Her shyness, and her concern that she hadn't lived enough to write the songs she wanted to sing." In 2013 Brianna was living in Sydney and described her variety of country music as Americana, "I'm not the typical Aussie country artist. Sometimes I don't even call myself country any more." Her debut studio album, Dark Side of the Morning, was released independently in March of that year. Sophie Hamley of Sunburnt Country Music observed, "The vulnerability that is on display from the start of this album is also its strength" while its influences, "are strongly alt-country and Americana but there are some traditional Irish sounds there too." ABC Radio's reviewer felt it is a "deeply moving debut LP that meditates on sadness, suburban loneliness and young womanhood."

Victim or Heroine (August 2016) is Brianna's second studio album, which was issued independently and distributed by MGM Distribution. It was produced by Shane Nicholson (Bill Chambers' former son-in-law), who also provided instrumentation, together with Matt Fell on bass guitar and Hammond organ and Glen Hannah on electric guitar, acoustic guitar, mando guitar and baritone guitar. Victim or Heroine peaked at number 17 on the ARIA Hitseekers Albums chart and number 35 on the ARIA Country Albums chart. Hamley noticed, "she combines dreaminess with a consciousness that is anchored in everyday life. Which makes [it] a salve and an escape, and a fitting second album for an important artist." Stephen of 2NM's Hunter Valley Today felt it was "mature and restrained" with songs that are "elegant and serene, firmly rooted in the push and pull of modern womanhood." Its lead single, "Birmingham", was released ahead of the album, in June.

"Boots" (2019) and "Wedding Ring" (February 2021) are singles from her third studio album, This Way or Some Other, which was produced by Adam Young (ex-the Daisygrinders, Big Heavy Stuff). Josh Leeson of The Newcastle Herald declared that with this album, "she's expanded her sound to incorporate elements of rock, and even power-pop, to her alt-country foundation." Music journalist Bernard Zuel praised its toughness, which "has nothing to do with abrasive or overpowering sound" but "from structure and arrangement to words and feeling teased out fully." As from June 2021 Brianna is married.

== Discography ==
=== Albums ===
List of albums, with selected details
Title	Details
Jindabyne: Original Motion Picture Soundtrack (by Paul Kelly, Dan Luscombe, Katie Brianna, and the Stormwater Boys)	Released: 2006; Format: CD; Label: Capitol Records (0946 3 69 47525)
Dark Side of the Morning	Released: 22 March 2013; Format: CD, Digital download; Label: Katie Brianna
Victim or the Heroine	Released: 15 August 2016 (Note: Victim or the Heroine did not enter the Australian Top 100 albums chart but did peak at number 17 on the ARIA Hitseekers Albums chart and number 35 on the ARIA Country Albums chart.); Format: CD, Digital; Label: Katie Brianna/MGM Distribution (KB003)
This Way or Some Other	Released: 26 March 2021; Format: CD, Digital, LP; Label: Stanley Records (SEG2021-17CD)

=== Extended plays ===
List of albums, with selected details
Title	Details
Katie Brianna	Released: December 2005; Format: CD; Label: Katie Brianna (KB001)

=== Singles ===
- "Jindabyne Fair" (by Katie Brianna and the Stormwater Boys) (2006)
- "Birmingham" (2016) – Independent/MGM Distribution
- "Boots" (2019)
- "Wedding Ring" (2021)

== Awards and nominations ==
=== ARIA Music Awards ===
The ARIA Music Awards is an annual awards ceremony that recognises excellence, innovation, and achievement across all genres of Australian music. They commenced in 1987.

Year	Nominee / work	Award	Result	Ref.
2006	Jindabyne (Note: The nomination is shared with fellow composers and performers, Paul Kelly, Dan Luscombe, Katie Brianna, and the Stormwater Boys.)	Best Original Soundtrack, Cast or Show Album	Won	

=== Country Music Awards of Australia ===
The Country Music Awards of Australia is an annual awards night held in January during the Tamworth Country Music Festival. Celebrating recording excellence in the Australian country music industry. They commenced in 1973.

Year	Nominee / work	Award	Result	Ref.
2017	Victim Or the Heroine	Alternative Country Album of the Year	Nominated	
