= Playroom =

Playroom, Play Room or The Playroom may refer to:

== Rooms ==
- Recreation room or play room
- Nursery (room) or play room
- Daycare room

== Arts, entertainment, media ==
- The Play Room (novel), a 1969 novel by Olivia Manning
- Mattel Playroom, a toy, games, and, play, resource website from Mattel

=== Music ===
- Play Room (album), a 2006 Steve LaSpina album from SteepleChase Records
- Playroom (radio series), a live performance program on WXTF-LP

=== Film ===
- Playroom (film), a 1989 film directed by Manny Coto
- The Playroom (film), a 2012 film directed by Julia Dyer

=== Television ===
- Playroom (TV series), an American children's television series
- PlayRoom (TV channel), a South African station
- Play Room (TV program), a Japanese TV show on Fuji TV hosted by Elli Rose
- 'The Playroom' (TV segment), a segment on the U.S. TV show Gabby's Dollhouse
- "The Playroom" (King Rollo), a 1980 episode
- "The Playroom" (Playhouse 90), a 1957 U.S. TV episode, a TV play on Playhouse 90

=== Video games ===
- The Playroom (1989 video game), a 1989 educational video game by Brøderbund Software
- The Playroom (2013 video game), a 2013 augmented reality video game by Sony
- PlayRoom, a stage in the 2005 videogame EyeToy: Play 3

== Places ==
- Play-Room, Walthamstow Hall, Sevenoaks, Kent, England, UK; a facility at Walthamstow Hall school
- Playroom School, Lincoln Park, Chicago, Illinois, USA; a children's school established by The Second City improv
- Seomra Spraoi (Irish: Play Room), a social centre in Dublin

== Other uses ==
- Playrooms, the student year groups at Stonyhurst Saint Mary's Hall, a Jesuit school in ancashire, England, UK
- Playroom Event, a Norwegian subsidiary of Fremantle (company)

== See also ==
- In The Playroom (photography), a photographic series by Jonathan Hobin
- Live at the Playroom (disambiguation)
- My Play Room School, Accra, Ghana; see List of Nursing Training Colleges in Ghana
- Kinderzimmer Productions (German: play-room), a German band
