= Testeagles =

- Origin: Adelaide, Australia
- Genres: Nu metal; rap rock; alternative rock; industrial metal
- Years active: 1994–2008, 2024-
- Labels: Krell/Epic/Sony
- Members: Matthew Matt; Adrian Matt; Dave Paisawa
- Past members: Dean Lawn

Testeagles, sometimes referred to as "TEs" or ''Testes'', are a three-piece rock band which formed in Adelaide, South Australia in 1994. The group is made up of brothers Matthew "Matty" Matt (lead guitar and lead vocals) and Adrian "Ady" Matt (drums), alongside Dave "D" Paisawa (bass guitar and vocals). D joined the lineup in late 1998, replacing their original bass guitarist, Dean.

The group have a handful of official releases to their name, the first being the Chum EP released in 1995, which was followed by the B-Sting and Friends EPs in 1998, their first tracks to secure them Triple J airplay. In 1999, the group released singles "Turn That Shit Up" and "Underdog" from their debut album, Non Comprehendus.

Non Comprehendus was released in February 2000 and peaked at No. 8 on the ARIA Albums Chart. This album, along with its singles, were also played on Triple J and gained them a much larger national following. A third single from the album, "Like No Other", was released in 2000.

== History ==
Testeagles were formed as a techno rock trio in Adelaide in 1994 by Matthew "Matty" Matt on lead guitar and lead vocals; his brother, Adrian "Ady" Matt on drums; and Dean "Deano" Lawn on bass guitar.

Australian musicologist Ian McFarlane felt they "displayed an uncanny ability to combine thudding metal/indie rock with electronic beats and samples to arrive at an intense brand of techno rock."

Their first extended play, Chum, was released in December 1995, with seven tracks, on the independent label DEF Records. They were signed by Stuart MacQueen of Adelaide-based independent label, Krell Records. During 1998 they issued two EPs, B-Sting (March) and Friends (August), on Krell.

In late 1998, Deano was replaced by D Paisawa. The band were signed by Epic/Sony and issued "Turn That Shit Up" as their first single in July 1999. In January 2000 "Turn That Shit Up" was listed at No. 66 on Triple J's Hottest 100 for 1999. The single was followed by "Underdog" (October 1999) and "Like No Other".

Their debut album, Non Comprehendus, appeared in February 2000, which peaked at No. 8 on the ARIA Albums Chart. It was produced by Paul McKercher (You Am I, Spiderbait).

McFarlane described it as "A heavy-duty mix of alterna-metal riff-rock, squalling sound effects, experimental electronic beats and samples, [it] was certainly the most visceral album to chart in the Australian Top 10 since the likes of Nine Inch Nails and Marilyn Manson." Christie Eliezer of Billboard felt the album was similar to material by United States groups, KoЯn and Limp Bizkit.

Due to label difficulties, the Testeagles left Sony and the independent label Krell.

The group were regulars at the annual Big Day Out festivals, and last appeared at the Adelaide venue in 2005.

Testeagles' final performance, before disbanding, was at the Hi-Fi Bar in Melbourne supporting Mammal on 21 June 2008.

In June 2024, 16 years after their last performance, Testeagles announced they were reforming to play in the Froth & Fury Festival in Port Adelaide.

In 2025, the band announced an Australian tour to celebrate the 25th anniversary of Non-Comprehendus, coinciding with a vinyl reissue of the album by Point Cook-based record store Rare Records.

== Discography ==
=== Studio albums ===
List of studio albums, with selected details and chart positions
Title	Details	Peak chart positions
Title	Details	AUS
Non Comprehendus	Released: February 2000; Label: Krell, Epic; Format: CD	8

=== Extended plays ===
List of EPs, with selected details
Title	Details
Testeagles Demo Tape	Released: 1994; Format: CD; Label: Testeagles
Chum	Released: 1995; Format: CD; Label: DEF Records (DEF 00250)
B-Sting	Released: March 1998; Format: CD; Label: Krell (KR0001)
Friends	Released: August 1998; Format: CD; Label: Krell (KR0004)
Rarities	Released: 2000; Format: CD; Label: Krell (SAMP2198)

=== Singles ===
List of singles, with selected chart positions
Title	Year	Peak chart positions
Title	Year	AUS
"Turn That Shit Up"	1999	54
"Underdog"	1999	74
"Like No Other"	2000	—
