= Thomas Osbert Mordaunt =

Lieutenant-General Thomas Osbert Mordaunt FRS
- Born: 1730; London
- Died: 13 February 1809 (aged 79); St James's, London
- Burial place: All Saints Church, Fulham
- Relatives: Scrope Howe, 1st Viscount Howe (grandfather); William Howe, 5th Viscount Howe (cousin); Richard Howe, 1st Earl Howe (cousin)
- Military career
- Allegiance: United Kingdom
- Branch: British Army
- Rank: Lieutenant-General
- Unit: 10th Dragoons
- Conflicts: Seven Years' War; Battle of Warburg

Lieutenant-General Thomas Osbert Mordaunt FRS (1730 – 13 February 1809) was a British Army officer and poet, known for "The Call".

== Military career ==
Thomas Osbert Mordaunt was the son of Colonel Charles Mordaunt and Anne Howe. His grandfather, Brigadier-General Lewis Mordaunt, was the younger brother of Charles Mordaunt, 3rd Earl of Peterborough, sometime First Lord of the Treasury. He was commissioned ensign and lieutenant in the 2nd Regiment of Foot Guards on 27 January 1753, and promoted captain-lieutenant in the 10th Regiment of Dragoons on 25 December 1755. He was further promoted to captain in 1759.

Mordaunt served with the regiment in Europe during the Seven Years' War. At the Battle of Warburg on 31 July 1760 the squadron he served in was volleyed twice by a regiment of German grenadiers, and his commanding officer was killed. Taking command of the survivors, Mordaunt charged the Germans, capturing 300 men and two brass cannon. Duke Ferdinand of Brunswick-Wolfenbüttel described it as one of the "prodigies of valour", and the captured cannon were displayed at the Tower of London. Mordaunt was promoted to major in 1764, and then advanced to command the regiment as a lieutenant-colonel on 25 October 1770. He was promoted to colonel on 25 November the following year, and remained in command through the American Revolutionary War, spending most of the war garrisoned in Scotland.

Mordaunt was promoted to major-general on 26 November 1782 and advanced to lieutenant-general on 18 October 1793. Having not been promoted any further, he died at his house in St James's, London, on 13 February 1809.

== Poetry ==
Mordaunt is best remembered for his oft-quoted poem "The Call", written during the Seven Years' War of 1756–1763:

"Sound, sound the clarion, fill the fife!
Throughout the sensual world proclaim,
One crowded hour of glorious life
Is worth an age without a name."

For many years, the poem was incorrectly attributed to Mordaunt's contemporary, Sir Walter Scott. Scott had merely quoted a stanza of the poem at the beginning of Chapter 34 (Chapter XIII of Volume II) of his novel Old Mortality.

One Crowded Hour, Tim Bowden's biography of Australian combat cameraman Neil Davis, takes its title from a phrase used in "The Call". Arthur Conan Doyle's short story, One Crowded Hour, makes ironic use of the same phrase. The band Augie March had a song called ‘’One Crowded Hour’’ in its honour.
