= Drones & Vapid Ditties =

- Music by: Augie March
- Distributed by: BMG Australia
- Release date: 6 September 2004
- Running time: 180 minutes
- Language: English

Drones & Vapid Ditties is a music DVD by Australian indie rock band Augie March. It was released on 6 September 2004 by BMG Australia. The initials of the words "Drones & Vapid Ditties" spell out the letters "DVD". Described on the back of the case as a "shambles", the DVD contains numerous live performances (including a full set from the 2003 Meredith Music Festival), as well as a collection of all the band's music videos to that date.
