= In Defence of Animals =

2005 book edited by Peter Singer

- Cover of the first edition
- Editor: Peter Singer
- Language: English
- Subject: Animal rights
- Publisher: Wiley-Blackwell
- Publication date: July 2004
- Publication place: United Kingdom
- Media type: Print (hardcover)
- Pages: 264
- ISBN: 978-1-4051-1941-2

In Defence of Animals: The Second Wave is a 2005 book edited by the philosopher Peter Singer. It contains chapters by Gaverick Matheny, Richard Ryder, Paola Cavalieri, Paul Waldau and others. The authors makes several arguments why harming animals is bad.
