= RVG (band) =

Australian rock band

- Origin: Melbourne, Victoria, Australia
- Genres: Indie rock; post-punk
- Years active: 2015–2024
- Labels: Fat Possum Records; Our Golden Friend; Fire Records; Ivy League Records
- Past members: Romy Vager; Reuben Bloxham; Marc Nolte; Isabele Wallace; Angus Bell; Siahn Davis

RVG (an acronym of Romy Vager Group) were an Australian rock band from Melbourne, Victoria, formed in 2015. The band's final line-up was composed of Romy Vager on vocals and lead guitar, rhythm guitarist and keyboardist Reuben Bloxham, bassist Isabele Wallace and drummer Marc Nolte. Original bassist Angus Bell was part of the band from its inception until 2019, being replaced briefly by Siahn Davis before Wallace joined as a permanent fixture later that year.

RVG have released three studio albums: A Quality of Mercy (2017), Feral (2020) and Brain Worms (2023). The band's blend of indie rock and post-punk has found considerable critical acclaim within Australia; Junkee has described RVG as "one of Australia’s best bands", while The Guardian has described Vager herself as "one of [Australia's] most underrated songwriters".

== Career ==
Vager formed RVG in Preston circa 2015, originally as a backing band for her solo material. Vager named the band the Romy Vager Group in tribute to the Patti Smith Group, later shortening it to the acronym to make the focus less on herself and more on the band as a unit. In October 2017, RVG released their debut studio album A Quality of Mercy. The record was made live at Melbourne pub The Tote, and was released without any promotion or formal announcement on their Bandcamp page.

In April 2020, RVG released their second album, Feral.

In February 2023, RVG released "Nothing Really Changes", the first single from the band's third studio album. Brain Worms was released on 2 June 2023. In an album review, Alex Gallagher from NME said "RVG's third album is their best yet. Taking the most vital elements of scrappy 2017 debut A Quality of Mercy and its brilliant, bold 2020 follow-up Feral, Romy Vager and her bandmates craft an ambitious, lush record full of feeling and executed with confidence."

In November 2023, Vager collaborated with Augie March on a cover of Nick Cave and the Bad Seeds' "Henry Lee," with Vager singing PJ Harvey's parts. Following a European tour in 2024, Vager disbanded RVG and launched a solo career the following year.

== Discography ==
=== Albums ===
Title	Details	Peak Chart Positions
Title	Details	AUS
A Quality of Mercy	Released: 3 March 2017; Label: Fat Possum, Our Golden Friend; Formats: Digital download, streaming	—
Feral	Released: 24 April 2020; Label: Fire, Our Golden Friend; Formats: Digital download, streaming	28
Brain Worms	Released: 2 June 2023; Label: Fire, Ivy League; Formats: Digital download, streaming	44

=== Singles ===
List of singles, showing year released and album name
Title	Year	Album
"A Quality of Mercy"	2017	A Quality of Mercy
"That's All"	2018	A Quality of Mercy
"Alexandra"	2019	Feral
"Dying on the Vine"	2019	Non-album single
"I Used to Love You"	2020	Feral
"Christian Neurosurgeon"	2020	Feral
"Perfect Day"	2020	Feral
"Army of Me" (with Julia Jacklin)	2021	Non-album single
"Nothing Really Changes"	2023	Brain Worms
"Squid"	2023	Brain Worms
"Midnight Sun"	2023	Brain Worms
"Don't Take It Badly"/"Pet Sematary"	2024	Non-album single

== Awards and nominations ==
=== AIR Awards ===
The Australian Independent Record Awards (commonly known informally as AIR Awards) is an annual awards night to recognise, promote and celebrate the success of Australia's Independent Music sector.

Year	Nominee / work	Award	Result	Ref.
2017	A Quality of Mercy	Best Independent Album	Nominated	
2017	A Quality of Mercy	Independent Breakthrough Artist	Nominated	
2017	A Quality of Mercy	Best Independent Hard Rock, Heavey or Punk Album	Nominated	
2017	"A Quality of Mercy"	Best Independent Song	Nominated	
2024	Brain Worms	Independent Album of the Year	Won	
2024	Brain Worms	Best Independent Rock Album or EP	Nominated	
2024	"Nothing Really Changes"	Independent Song of the Year	Nominated	
2024	Hayden Somerville for RVG – "Nothing Really Changes"	Independent Video of the Year	Nominated	

=== APRA Awards ===
The APRA Awards are held in Australia and New Zealand by the Australasian Performing Right Association to recognise songwriting skills, sales and airplay performance by its members annually.

Year	Nominee / work	Award	Result	Ref.
2024	"Nothing Really Changes"	Song of the Year	Shortlisted	

=== Australian Music Prize ===
The Australian Music Prize (the AMP) is an annual award of $30,000 given to an Australian band or solo artist in recognition of the merit of an album released during the year of award. It exists to discover, reward and promote new Australian music of excellence.

Year	Nominee / work	Award	Result	Ref.
2023	Brain Worms	Australian Music Prize	Won	

=== J Awards ===
The J Awards are an annual series of Australian music awards that were established by the Australian Broadcasting Corporation's youth-focused radio station Triple J. They commenced in 2005.

Year	Nominee / work	Award	Result	Ref.
2023	RVG	Double J Artist of the Year	Nominated	

=== Music Victoria Awards ===
The Music Victoria Awards, are an annual awards night celebrating Victorian music. The commenced in 2005.

Year	Nominee / work	Award	Result	Ref.
2017	A Quality of Mercy	Best Album	Nominated	
2017	"A Quality of Mercy"	Best Song	Nominated	
2017	themselves	Best Band	Nominated	
2017	themselves	Best Emerging Talent	Nominated	
2019	Romy Vager (RVG)	Best Female Musician	Nominated	
2020	Feral	Best Album	Nominated	
2020	Feral	Best Rock/Punk Album	Nominated	
2020	"I Used to Love You"	Best Song	Nominated	
2020	themselves	Best Band	Nominated	
2020	Romy Vager (RVG)	Best Musician	Nominated	
2021	RVG	Best Live Act	Nominated	
2023	"Nothing Really Changes"	Best Song or Track	Nominated	
2023	RVG	Best Group	Nominated	
2023	RVG	Best Rock/Punk Work	Nominated	
2024	RVG	Best Group	Won	

=== National Live Music Awards ===
The National Live Music Awards (NLMAs) commenced in 2016 to recognise contributions to the live music industry in Australia.

Year	Nominee / work	Award	Result	Ref.
2017	Romy Vager (RVG)	Victorian Live Voice of the Year	Won	
2023	RVG	Best Indie/Rock/Alternative Act	Nominated	
2023	Romy Vager (RVG)	Best Live Voice	Nominated	
