= Watch Me Disappear =

Studio album by Augie March
- Released: 10 October 2008
- Recorded: Auckland (Neil Finn's studios), Melbourne, Sydney, Los Angeles
- Genre: Indie rock
- Label: Sony BMG Australia
- Producer: Joe Chiccarelli

Augie March chronology
Moo, You Bloody Choir (2006)	Watch Me Disappear (2008)	Havens Dumb (2014)

Professional ratings
Review scores
Source	Rating
The Australian	(positive)
Herald Sun	4/5 stars
Sydney Morning Herald	(positive)
Triple J	(positive)

Watch Me Disappear is the fourth studio album from Australian indie rock group Augie March. The album was released on 10 October 2008. The album's title track was made available for download on the band's website on 26 August 2008. Augie March recorded Watch Me Disappear at Neil Finn's Auckland studios with producer Joe Chiccarelli. They also recorded in Melbourne, Sydney, and Los Angeles. The first single, "Pennywhistle", was released digitally on 16 September and physically on 27 September. Watch Me Disappear reached number four on the ARIA Albums Chart.

At the J Awards of 2008, the album was nominated for Australian Album of the Year.

== Track listing ==
All tracks are written by Glenn Richards.

No.	Title	Length
1.	"Watch Me Disappear"	5:07
2.	"Pennywhistle"	4:17
3.	"Becoming Bryn"	3:45
4.	"City of Rescue"	3:20
5.	"Farmer's Son"	4:20
6.	"Mugged by the Mob"	4:41
7.	"The Slant"	3:06
8.	"The Glenorchy Bunyip"	2:44
9.	"Dogsday"	4:45
10.	"Lupus"	4:15
11.	"The Devil in Me"	4:11

== Charts ==
Chart (2008)	Peak position
Australian Albums (ARIA)	4
