= Waltz (EP) =

EP by Augie March
- Released: August 1999
- Genre: Indie rock
- Label: BMG Australia

Augie March chronology
Thanks for the Memes (1998)	Waltz (1999)	Sunset Studies (2000)

Waltz the second EP released by the Australian indie rock band Augie March. It was first released in August 1999. It includes the first appearance of the band's early hit "Asleep in Perfection". A music video was also issued for the closing track, "The Moth Ball".

At the ARIA Music Awards of 2000, the EP was nominated for Breakthrough Artist – Single.

== Track listing ==
1. "Asleep in Perfection" (4:05)
2. "None Shall Pass" (5:26)
3. "Rich Girl" (4:57)
4. "Departure" (4:47)
5. "The Moth Ball" (5:46)

== Charts ==
Chart (1999)	Peak position
Australian (ARIA Charts)	76
