= Havens Dumb =

Studio album by Augie March
- Released: 3 October 2014
- Genre: Indie rock
- Length: 1:03:37
- Label: Caroline

Augie March chronology
Watch Me Disappear (2008)	Havens Dumb (2014)	Bootikins (2018)

Havens Dumb is the fifth studio album by the Australian indie rock band Augie March. It was released on 3 October 2014 and it peaked at number 14 on the ARIA Charts.

The Guardian newspaper gave the album a lukewarm review, while FasterLouder gave the album eight stars out of ten.

== Track listing ==
1. "AWOL" – 3:58
2. "After The Crack Up" – 4:16
3. "Bastard Time" – 3:55
4. "A Dog Starved" – 3:49
5. "Hobart Obit" – 4:55
6. "Father Jack And Mr. T" – 4:23
7. "St. Helena" – 5:00
8. "The Faking Boy" – 1:48
9. "Definitive History" – 6:00
10. "Villa Adriana" – 5:36
11. "Millenarians' Mirror" – 3:49
12. "Sailing To The Moon" – 2:55
13. "Never Been Sad" – 7:20
14. "The Crime" – 6:04

== Charts ==
Chart (2014)	Peak position
Australian Albums (ARIA)	14
