= Augie March =

Australian indie/pop rock band

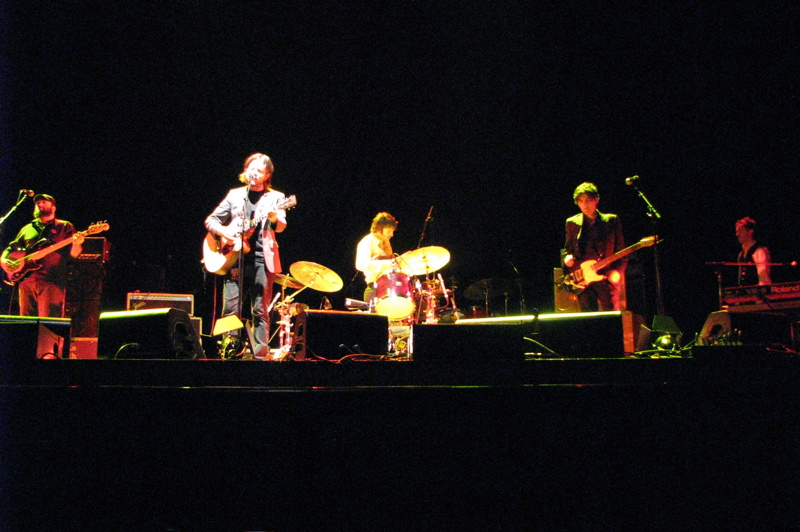
- Augie March playing at Rod Laver Arena in support of Crowded House in November 2007

Background information
- Origin: Shepparton, Victoria, Australia
- Genres: Pop; indie rock; chamber folk; soft rock
- Years active: 1996–2009; 2014-present
- Labels: rA/BMG; Sony BMG; spinART; Jive; Dark Satanic
- Members: Edmondo Ammendola; Glenn Richards; David Williams; Kiernan Box
- Past members: Rob Dawson; Adam Donovan
- Website: augiemarch.com

Augie March are an Australian pop and indie rock band formed in 1996 in Shepparton, Victoria. The group currently consists of vocalist and rhythm guitarist Glenn Richards, bass guitarist Edmondo Ammendola, drummer David Williams, and keyboardist Kiernan Box. Box had replaced Robert Dawson, the band's piano player since March 2000, who died in January 2001. Lead guitarist Adam Donovan was a member from the band's inception until 2025.

Augie March's first full-length album, Sunset Studies, was released in 2000. It was critically acclaimed and received four ARIA Music Award nominations in 2001, which won Engineer of the Year for Chris Dickie, Chris Thompson, Paul McKercher and Richard Pleasance. Critics, both in Australia and the United States, also lauded its 2002 successor, Strange Bird. The group's third album, Moo, You Bloody Choir (2006), reached number 10 on the ARIA Albums Chart. It provided the lead single, "One Crowded Hour", which attained critical acclaim and provided their highest position on the related singles chart at number 29. The album and single were nominated for six ARIA Music Awards in 2006, while Moo, You Bloody Choir won the Australian Music Prize for that year. Having achieved mainstream success, the band toured Australia and the US through 2006 and 2007.

In 2008 they released their fourth album, Watch Me Disappear, which reached number 4. Although commercially successful it received less favourable critical reception. Augie March disbanded in late 2009 and reformed in mid-2014. They have released three studio albums since their resumption. The band's distinctive musical style is directed by main songwriter, Richards. His lyrics draw critical acclaim for their poetic style. The band's music is variously described as intricate, lush, and dense, acting as a backdrop for Richards' complex vocals.

== History ==
=== Formation and early EPs (1996–1999) ===
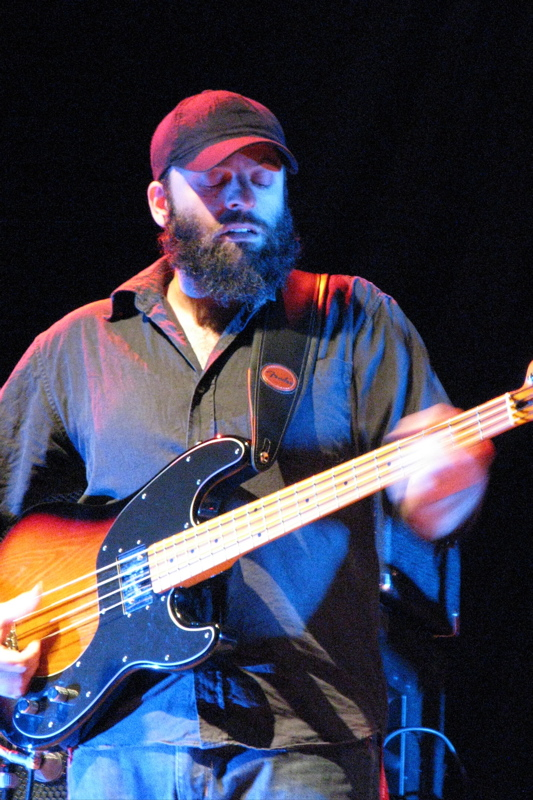
Edmondo Ammendola on bass guitar for Augie March, Canberra, November 2007.

Augie March were formed in the Victorian rural city of Shepparton in 1996 with the original line-up of Edmondo Ammendola on bass guitar, Adam Donovan on lead guitar, Glenn Richards on vocals and guitar, and David Williams on drums. According to Australian musicologist, Ian McFarlane, "[they] won critical praise for [their] mix of literate, sensitive pop and chamber folk." Donovan, Richards and Williams grew up and attended school in the Shepparton area. Richards began writing songs while studying English literature at University of Melbourne in 1996. He invited Donovan and Williams, who had been studying music at the Northern Melbourne Institute of TAFE (NMIT), to form the band. The pair asked fellow NMIT student, Ammendola to join. The band's name references the titular protagonist of the 1953 novel The Adventures of Augie March by Saul Bellow, according to AllMusic's Gregory McIntosh, who cites the novel's "poetic, complex prose" as complementary to Richards' lyrics.

Augie March relocated to Melbourne before their first performance in Brunswick at a friend's visual art exhibition. In 1997 they were signed to Ra Records (rooArt subsidiary distributed by BMG). Augie March's first extended play (EP), Thanks for the Memes, was produced by Victor Van Vugt (Beth Orton, Nick Cave). The five-track EP was released in January 1998. Despite positive reviews it received little airplay. It was re-released in mid-2003 with an additional track, "300 Nights". Greg Lawrence of Worldwide Home of Australasian Music and More Online (WHAMMO) observed that the six-track version displayed, "dynamic arrangements, an endless lyrical depth and the ability to rock with intensity." In 2007 Williams described his surprise that they had found a producer, due to their obscure music, which at the time they considered, "hip and cool, and intellectual."

Augie March followed with their second EP, Waltz, in August 1999, which was produced by Richard Pleasance (Deborah Conway, Nick Barker#1993-1995: Barker). The EP included "Asleep in Perfection", which became the most requested song on Australian Broadcasting Corporation's rage program. The song was nominated for Breakthrough Artist – Single, and Pleasance for Producer of the Year, at the ARIA Music Awards of 2000. The band toured Australia, including to Perth, and their popularity increased through word of mouth. BMG offered Augie March a recording contract, which they accepted.

=== Early albums (2000–2003) ===
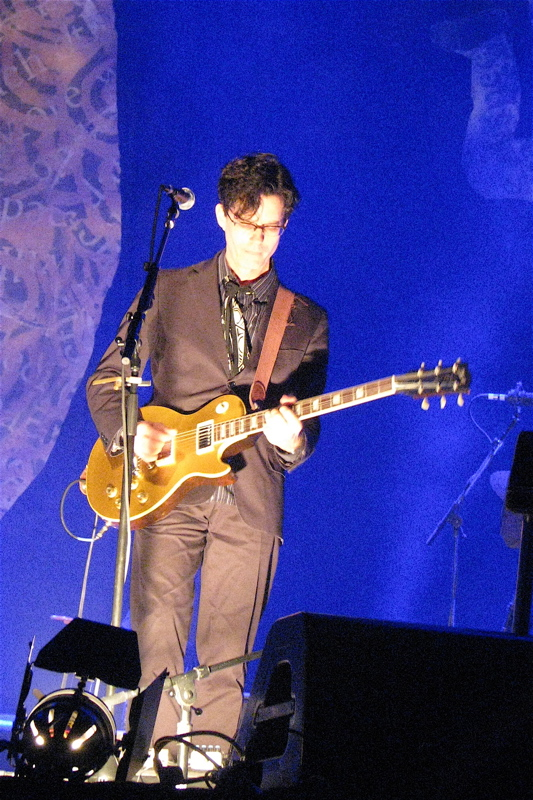
Adam Donovan on lead guitar for Augie March, Canberra, November 2007.

Augie March went into the studio in March 2000 to begin work on their first full-length album, Sunset Studies. Richards' friend, Rob Dawson, officially joined the band on keyboards and piano, after being a studio musician on Thanks for the Memes and Waltz. Richards returned to Shepparton to write the material for the album. The band worked in nine studios with six different engineers over the course of six months. In July 2000 they released its first single, "Hole in Your Roof". In October 2000 Sunset Studies appeared. The group attempted to organise launches in Sydney and Melbourne, however, they were thwarted, Donovan explained "it seemed like every band in the country was doing a tour then and we couldn't get any venues." They undertook a tour along Australia's east coast. The album peaked at number 35 on the ARIA Albums Chart.

Sunset Studies' critical reception was generally positive; Noel Mengel of The Courier-Mail said that on the album, "songs of quiet reflection, starkly beautiful melodies and intimate poetry collide on the canvas without a thought to sales graphs or what radio program directors might think," while AllMusic's Jack Rabid told American readers "it's worth the effort to track down [the album], particularly for those who think there are no more musical craftsmen out there." The album earned the ARIA Award for Engineer of the Year for 2001, and received nominations for Producer of the Year, Breakthrough Artist – Album and Best Cover Art for Sam Hickey's work. Of the album's six engineers, Pleasance, Paul McKercher, Chris Thompson and Chris Dickie qualified for the ARIA Award for best engineer. McKercher and Pleasance, as well as the band, were named producers. Of the singles released from this album, "There Is No Such Place" was their most popular, which was listed at number 47 on the Triple J Hottest 100, 2001 listeners poll.

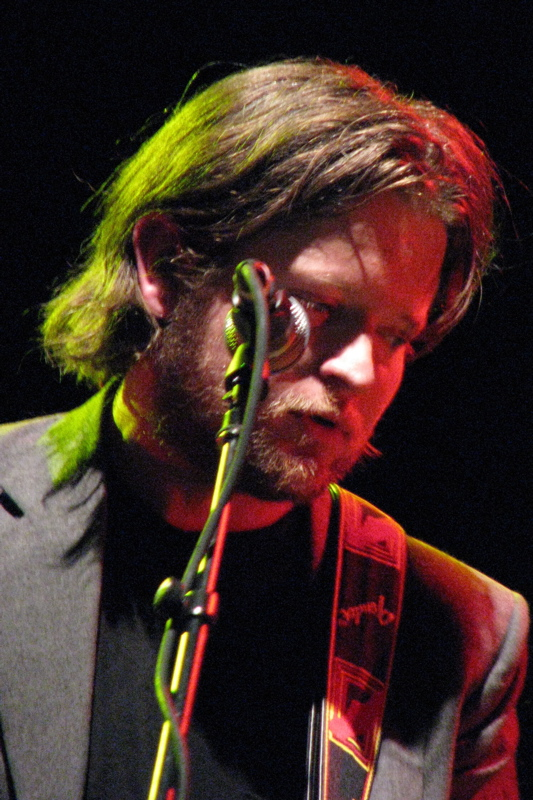
Glenn Richards on lead vocals and guitar for Augie March, Canberra, November 2007.

Preparations for a follow-up to Sunset Studies were disrupted on 2 January 2001 when Robert Dawson died in a two-car collision near Bairnsdale, Victoria, the other driver also died. Dawson's death had a significant impact on the band, especially on Richards who was writing for their second album, Strange Bird. However, it is not mournful; Richards described it as optimistic and humorous. Melburnian Kiernan Box (ex-the Blackeyed Susans) joined the group on harmonica, organ, piano and piano accordion. The band produced Strange Bird independently; Donovan said this worked to their advantage as they felt more comfortable in their own studio, and that as a result Strange Bird was a better album than Sunset Studies, though the band's debut album was "probably received better by our fans." In response to previous complaints about misinterpretations of Richards' Sunset Studies wordplay, Augie March included a lyrics booklet with Strange Bird.

Strange Bird was released by BMG as the band's second studio album in October 2002. It was also released by spinART Records in the United Kingdom in that month. It was re-released in the United States in September 2004. Strange Bird reached number 34 on the ARIA charts, while its lead single, "The Vineyard", peaked at number 31. Augie March undertook the Strange Bird Tour around Australia. The critical response to Strange Bird was largely positive, and by the following June, Williams was mystified. He explained to Rip It Up!'s Scott McLennan, "I could see a few holes in the album and I'd say, 'how come no one else has picked this up?' I stopped reading our album reviews for a while." Reviewers, however, focused on the positives; Guy Garvey in The Independent said "My favourite of the year is Augie March's Strange Bird", while David Fricke wrote in Rolling Stone of "luxuriant melees of chiming guitars, mountain-stream voices and keyboard grandeur." Donovan told Beat Magazine's Karen Conrad that the band found it hard to take the "flattering" reviews too seriously, "if we did our heads would explode or overinflate."

=== Mainstream breakthrough (2004–2009) ===
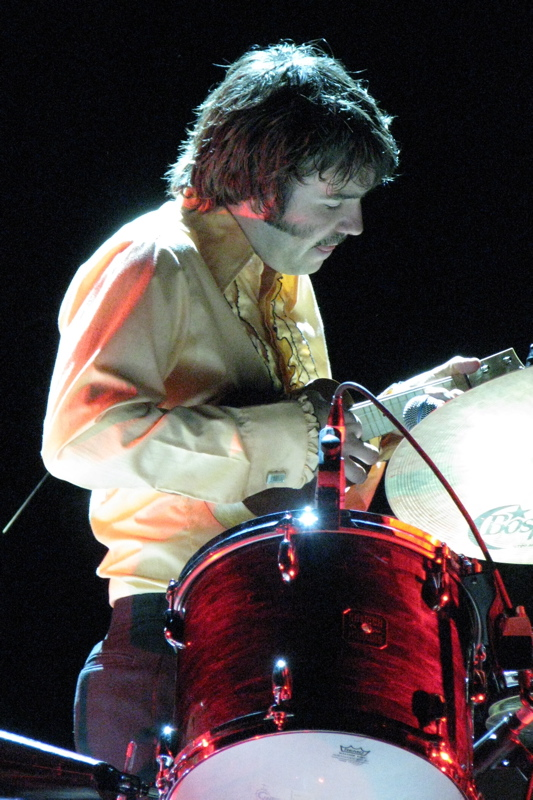
David Williams on drums for Augie March, Canberra, November 2007.

Augie March returned to the studio in 2004 to record their third album, Moo, You Bloody Choir. The band worked with two producers, McKercher and Eric Drew Feldman, and recorded in Melbourne, San Francisco, and their own studio in Nagambie, Victoria. Donovan explained this suited the band's style; they co-produced their albums, as they were interested in improving production. It enabled them to work at their own pace. Also during that time BMG merged with Sony Music Australia, hence the gap of three-and-a-half years since Strange Bird.

In the interim they released a DVD, Drones & Vapid Ditties, containing live performances and music videos, in mid-2004. Moo, You Bloody Choir, according to Triple J, was inspired by the streets of Melbourne. Upon completion of the initial recording sessions, there was a six-month delay before release, as Augie March added finishing touches. In March 2006, Moo, You Bloody Choir, appeared and they received critical acclaim and mainstream success. The album spent 21 weeks on the ARIA Albums Chart top 50, peaking at number ten. The album was certified platinum in Australia. Its lead single "One Crowded Hour" reached number 29 on the ARIA Singles Chart.

Work by Augie March was nominated for six more ARIA Music Awards in 2006, including "One Crowded Hour" for Single of the Year. Contrary to media speculation, the band did not win any further ARIAs. The group were also popular with national youth radio listeners as "One Crowded Hour" topped Triple J Hottest 100, 2006 poll. The album was nominated for the 2006 J Award. A 2008 The Australian poll ranked "One Crowded Hour" at No. 10 on their best Australian song of the past 20 years list.

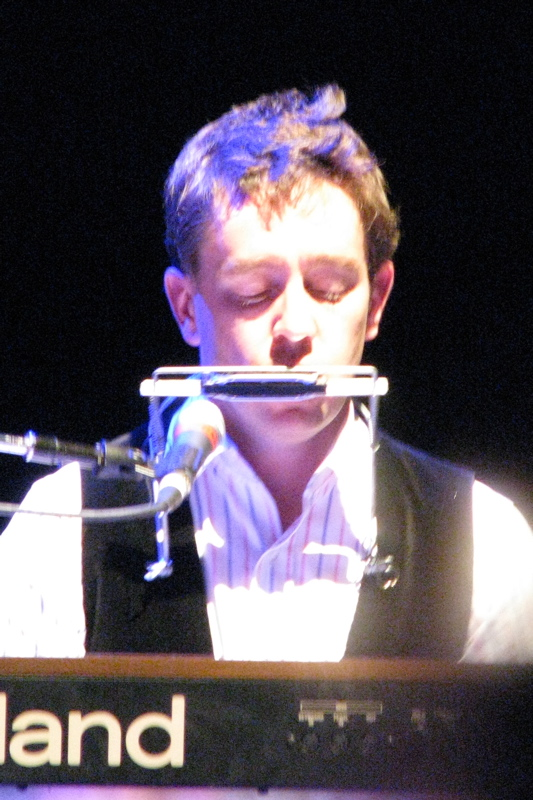
Kiernan Box on keyboards and harmonica for Augie March, Canberra, November 2007.

Augie March's musical abilities were acknowledged when Moo, You Bloody Choir won the second annual Australian Music Prize in 2006 for "the most outstanding and creative Australian album released in the past year." Ammendola told Drum Media's Andrew Street that this award was more significant than an ARIA: it is "nominated on the grounds of music, and the art of it – not necessarily record sales." The band used the A$25,000 prize money to fund their second US tour. Richards explained that they had no expectation of a US breakthrough and if this second attempt was not successful, they would not try again.

Augie March played in Los Angeles and New York in May 2007. In August of that year, Moo, You Bloody Choir was released in the US via Jive Zomba. Additional US shows followed, where they were praised by local media. Joe Tangari of Pitchfork Media called it a "crime" that the band had not broken through in North America earlier, though AllMusic's Ben Peterson remarked that Strange Bird was a higher quality album than its follow-up. Despite the Australian success of Moo, You Bloody Choir, much of the group's post-album touring was backing other artists. They played shows supporting the Aliens and Andrew Bird in the US, before returning to Australia to open for Crowded House. Richards said the band's status as an opening act, rather than head-liner, was a challenge—their intention was to win over the main act's fans. He described the Aliens tour as depressing; they played different types of music and attendances were small. Augie March had a prime slot at the 2008 Big Day Out.

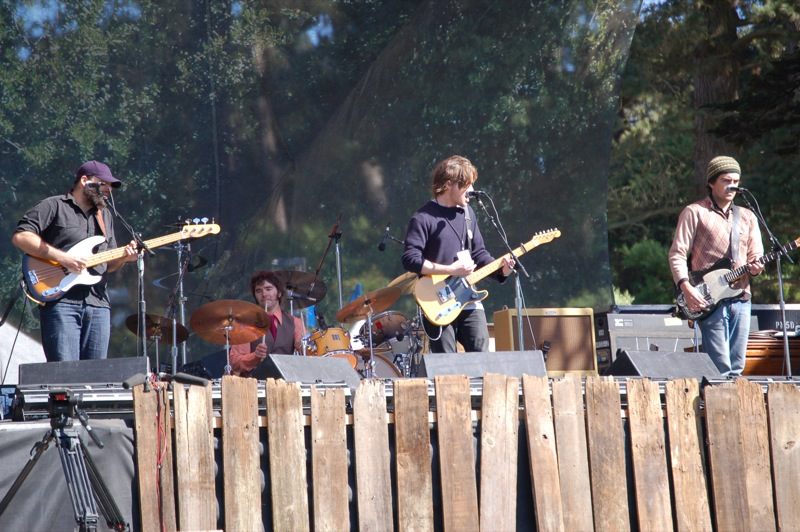
Augie March on stage at the Hardly Strictly Bluegrass festival in October 2007

Richards was now expected by Sony BMG's agents to produce a quality follow-up, they persisted with, "Richo, have you got a single? Do you have singles? Please, do you have singles?" Much of the writing for their fourth album, Watch Me Disappear, took place while touring the US, which Richards argued minimised the band's opportunities to be creative. In 2008 they began recording at Neil Finn's Auckland studios; and followed with studios in Melbourne, Sydney and Los Angeles. The band worked primarily in New Zealand to get away from distractions in Melbourne and focussing on recording.

Augie March worked with producer, Joe Chiccarelli, who took a significant pay cut after declaring his interest in their music. According to Richards, the production occurred with "a fair bit of friction." Ammendola was critical of Chiccarelli's style and the short time they spent in the studio. The recording process also took its toll on relationships within the band. Ammendola declared, "It tore us to bits. It was really really shit, we're slowly patching up now." After uploading the album's title track on their website for free downloading, Augie March announced their "proper headline tour of their homeland," where they would play music from that album. The album was released in October 2008 and its reception was mixed compared with its predecessors. Patrick Donovan of The Age wrote, "[Y]ou get the feeling that [it] will please more than just their mates and old fans," but Bernard Zuel of The Sydney Morning Herald felt it was "an album that no doubt will polarise fans." Watch Me Disappear entered the ARIA Albums Chart at number four – their highest position.

Augie March played at the Melbourne Cricket Ground on 14 March 2009 for Sound Relief, a multi-venue rock music concert in support of relief for the Victorian Bushfire Crisis. The event was held simultaneously with a concert at the Sydney Cricket Ground. All the proceeds from the Melbourne concert went to the Red Cross Victorian Bushfire relief. Appearing with Augie March in Melbourne were, Bliss N Eso with Paris Wells, Gabriella Cilmi, Hunters & Collectors, Kasey Chambers and Shane Nicholson with Troy Cassar-Daley, Jack Johnson, Jet, Kings of Leon, Liam Finn, Midnight Oil, Paul Kelly, Split Enz and Wolfmother.

In July 2009, "One Crowded Hour" was voted number 59 by the Australian public in Triple J Hottest 100 of all time. That same month, the band undertook the Watch Me Set My Strange Sun You Bloody Choir tour, where they played every state capital and many regional towns, performing each of their four albums. In December 2009 the band went into hiatus. Richards released his first solo album, Glimjack, in 2010.

=== Reformation after hiatus (2014–present) ===
After four-and-a-half years, on 16 June 2014, Augie March announced—via their official Facebook page—that they are off hiatus. A week later the band posted that they have been working on a full-length album, Havens Dumb, for the last two-and-a-half years. It was released on 3 October 2014 and was rated at 3.5 out-of 5 stars by Zuel, who find, "Australia's complex/troubled relationships between mateship v exclusion, honour v greed, and history v mythology has become more pronounced." On 23 February 2018, Augie March released their sixth album, Bootikins. According to the band's website, it was written and recorded in Melbourne and Hobart and was produced by Australian producer Tony Cohen shortly before he died. In December 2021, the band released its seventh album, Bloodsport & Porn. Three years later, their eighth album Malagrotta was released, composed from "notes made on a mobile phone while in the grip of a species of long Covid and a brutal high European Summer".

In November 2023, Augie March collaborated with Romy Vager and released a cover of Nick Cave and the Bad Seeds' "Henry Lee".

== Musical style ==
Asleep in Perfection
Augie March's first hit, "Asleep in Perfection", topped request charts on rage, though some critics considered the music on Sunset Studies which it exemplified to be too complex for a mainstream audience.

This Train Will Be Taking No Passengers
"The Vineyard" and "This Train Will Be Taking No Passengers" were praised as the opening duo to Strange Bird. This song was described as "a wailing rockabilly psych raver".

One Crowded Hour
The chorus of "One Crowded Hour" showcased Richard's complex lyrics, and the more subdued approach the band took on Moo, You Bloody Choir. Richards took special pride in the song's chorus, which he considered "damn good".

While Augie March generally fall into an indie/pop rock genre, their ability to mix other genres into their style at times makes classifying their musical style difficult. A common thread that runs through the band's sound is Richards' literate and often verbose lyrics, which have set the band apart from much of the rest of the Australian music scene. Even early on in their career, Richards' unique lyrical style, largely influenced by poets A.D. Hope and Kenneth Slessor, attracted attention and critical acclaim, with one reviewer describing him as "unique", "refreshing", and "intellectual". AllMusic's Jack Rabid said Richards "exhibits a honey voice" on Sunset Studies, but Grok pointed out that the album was rendered too complex or intricate for a mainstream audience.

Richards' passion for poetry and literary studies again stood out on Strange Bird. John D. Luerssen of Rolling Stone said "poetry aficionado Richards puts his own literary stamp" on the album, and James Christopher Monger of AllMusic said the album contained "pastoral beauty, labyrinthine arrangements, and breathtaking prose". Pitchfork Media's Joe Tangari described the album as "so stuffed with ideas and instruments that it's wont to rupture from time to time". This was both a positive and negative criticism; Tangari complained that at times "there is a surplus of sound", but also said that the combination of the first two tracks—"The Vineyard" ("slow beauty") and "This Train Will Be Taking No Passengers" ("a wailing rockabilly psych raver")—was an excellent set-up. Derek Miller of Stylus Magazine called the opening trio—the third song being the "simple acoustic guitar and arcing piano" of "Little Wonder"—bewildering, and that the album remained consistently as such throughout. PopMatters' Zeth Lundy described Richards' wordplay as frenzied, and said the "refined, worldly wit" on Strange Bird was striking.

Where Strange Bird was brimming with musical content, on Moo, You Bloody Choir Augie March were more simplified, while still maintaining some of the critically acclaimed aspects of their music. Ammendola considered their third album, led by "One Crowded Hour", to be significantly different from their previous releases. Chad Grischow of IGN wrote of "lush, mesmerizing music meld with gorgeous melodies brought to life by Richards' rich vocals that wrap themselves around each instrument". In The Sydney Morning Herald, Bernard Zuel argued the album was more subdued; "the tempos and the arrangements are a little quieter and simpler". Richards' lyrics, however, still drew praise; "he writes with a 19th-century novelist's ear and a Dylanesque tongue". Miller of Stylus also touched on the fact that "Moo is as direct a shot as you'll ever get at Augie March", but that it was nonetheless a "refining and continuation" of the band's work thus far. Shirley Halperin, writing for Entertainment Weekly, said the album featured "smooth, emotive vocals mingle with soaring melodies that'd make Paul McCartney proud". Dan Raper of PopMatters said the lyrics to "One Crowded Hour" were poetic, citing the lines "Well put me in a cage full of lions / I'll learn to speak lion / In fact I know the language well", as well as the "full and glorious" chorus;

And for one crowded hour, you were the only one in the room
And I sailed around all those bumps in the night to your beacon in the gloom
I thought I had found my golden September in the middle of that purple June
But one crowded hour would lead to my wreck and ruin

Watch Me Disappear was Augie March's most mainstream pop work to date, described as a further distillation of the band's earlier, even more complex, music. Richards considered it to be more streamlined than their early work, despite their attempts to maintain a sense of spontaneity. Zuel also noted a removal of much of the backing instrumentation which had acted as "clutter" around Richards' vocals on earlier work. Scott Podmore wrote in the Herald Sun that the album did not have a standout song or an instant appeal but that it was "a slow burner that takes time to get to know you, but once it does, it's a friend for good". Triple J reviewer Jenny Valentish argued that multiple songs from the album could take the place of "One Crowded Hour" as "likely to become wailed for and misquoted at festivals". She noted a "commercial potential" for the album, despite its more disconcerting and confrontational content.

Glenn Richards thinks of language like a patient high on nitrous oxide thinks of laughing. He delights in its possibilities, its connotations, its kaleidoscopic permutations, its violent convulsions.

— Zeth Lundy, PopMatters
In a review of Strange Bird.

== Songwriting ==
Songwriting for Augie March is primarily initiated by Richards; he delivers demos to the rest of the band members who then collaborate with him to develop the music. Kathy McCabe of The Daily Telegraph suggests "almost every songwriter in Australia has name-checked [Richards] as one of the finest tunesmiths of his generation" and that "Richards is a storyteller who is spoken of in reverential terms by peers". Richards simply states that he enjoys "dabbling with words", and that people often appreciate him doing so. Despite this, Richards rejects the "literary" reputation he believes the band have gained. At the 2006 ARIA Awards, Midnight Oil's Rob Hirst called for more political songs; Richards told Simon Collins of The West Australian he saw great risk in writing political music, and would rather write music that rung true, so that "I can sing the song a thousand times after it's been written". Richards asserts he preferred to draw on everyday experiences than on literary influences. He also says that some of the music he writes is intentionally confusing.

The band, and especially Richards, are noted for their perfectionism. In a post-Sunset Studies interview with Grok magazine in 2000, Williams criticised the song "The Good Gardener (On How He Fell)", to which the interviewer noted "the Augie March perfectionism ... a slavish, romantic, almost passionate pursuit". This meme continued throughout Augie March's career; following the release of Moo, You Bloody Choir, Richards said he was not truly happy with anything he had produced so far. Ammendola agreed, and added that the band considered Moo, You Bloody Choir the weakest of their first three albums, and Sunset Studies the best. Richards later stated that he considered Watch Me Disappear his best album yet. Andrew Murfett wrote in The Age that for Augie March, "creative tension, adverse circumstances and perfectionism seem to go hand in hand".

== Live concerts ==
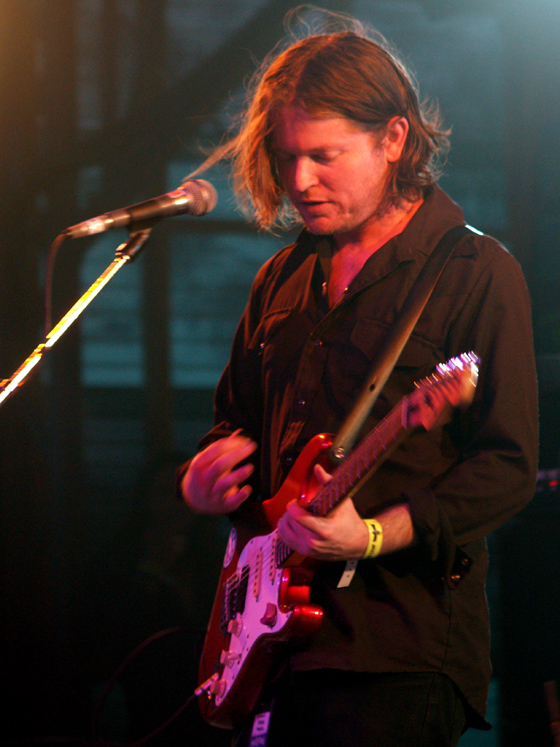
Richards, Meredith Music Festival December 2006 Courtesy Mandy Hall

While early live performances were criticised, performances post-Moo, You Bloody Choir have earned great and consistent praise. David Fricke of Rolling Stone lauded an Augie March concert he saw in New York, which assisted the band in making inroads in the United States.

Over the years, the band have built up a loyal audience, who enjoy frequent and repeated attendance at Augie March shows. Glenn Richards has stated that this has been a great asset to the band. "We have a pretty great fan base" Richards said "they get it".

== Discography ==
- Sunset Studies (2000)
- Strange Bird (2002)
- Moo, You Bloody Choir (2006)
- Watch Me Disappear (2008)
- Havens Dumb (2014)
- Bootikins (2018)
- Bloodsport & Porn (2021)
- Malagrotta (2024)

== Awards and nominations ==
=== APRA Awards ===
The APRA Awards are presented annually from 1982 by the Australasian Performing Right Association (APRA), "honouring composers and songwriters". They commenced in 1982.

Year	Nominee / work	Award	Result	Ref.
2015	"A Dog Starved" (Glenn Richards)	Song of the Year	Shortlisted	

=== ARIA Music Awards ===
The ARIA Music Awards is an annual awards ceremony that recognises excellence, innovation, and achievement across all genres of Australian music. Augie March has won one award from thirteen nominations.

Year	Nominee / work	Award	Result
2000	Augie March & Richard Pleasance for Asleep in Perfection	Producer of the Year	Nominated
2000	"Asleep in Perfection (Waltz)"	Breakthrough Artist - Single	Nominated
2001	Sunset Studies	Best Cover Art	Nominated
2001	Sunset Studies	Breakthrough Artist - Album	Nominated
2001	Sunset Studies	Producer of the Year	Nominated
2001	Sunset Studies	Engineer of the Year	Won
2006	Moo, You Bloody Choir	Album of the Year	Nominated
2006	Moo, You Bloody Choir	Best Group	Nominated
2006	Moo, You Bloody Choir	Best Rock Album	Nominated
2006	Paul McKercher and Augie March	Producer of the Year	Nominated
2006	Paul McKercher and Augie March	Engineer of the Year	Nominated
2006	"One Crowded Hour"	Single of the Year	Nominated
2007	"The Cold Acre" (director Ben Saunders and Germain McMicking)	Best Video	Nominated

=== Australian Music Prize ===
The Australian Music Prize (the AMP) is an annual award of $30,000 given to an Australian band or solo artist in recognition of the merit of an album released during the year of award. The commenced in 2005.

Year	Nominee / work	Award	Result
2006	Moo, You Bloody Choir	Australian Music Prize	Won

=== EG Awards / Music Victoria Awards ===
The EG Awards (known as Music Victoria Awards since 2013) are an annual awards night celebrating Victorian music. They commenced in 2006.

Year	Nominee / work	Award	Result
2007	Augie March	Best Band	Won

=== J Awards ===
The J Awards are an annual series of Australian music awards that were established by the Australian Broadcasting Corporation's youth-focused radio station Triple J. They commenced in 2005.

Year	Nominee / work	Award	Result
2014	themselves	Double J Artist of the Year	Nominated
