= Glenn Richards =

Australian musician (born 1973)

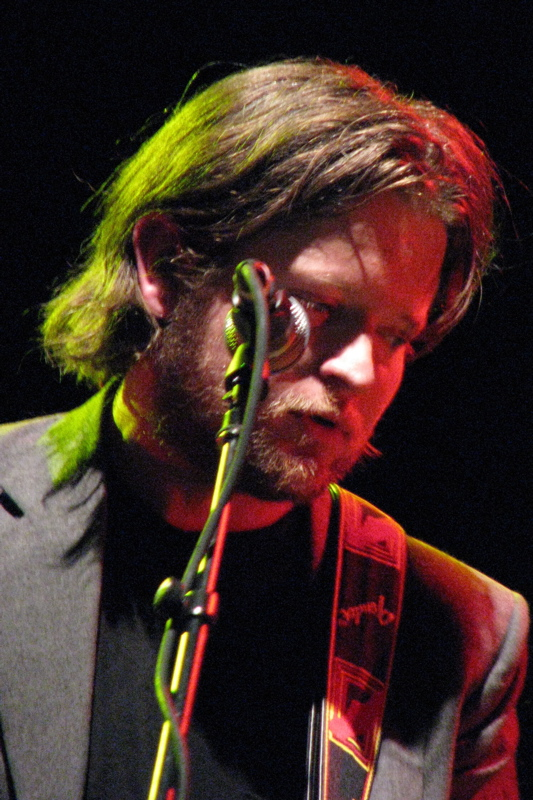
- Richards in 2007

Background information
- Also known as: G. A. Richards
- Born: Glenn Anthony Richards; 29 December 1973 (age 52); Shepparton, Victoria, Australia
- Genre: Rock
- Occupations: Musician, songwriter
- Instruments: Guitar, vocals
- Years active: 1996–present
- Label: BMG Australia
- Member of: Augie March
- Website: https://augiemarch.com/glennrichards

Glenn Anthony Richards (born 29 December 1973) is an Australian musician, best known as the mainstay guitarist singer-songwriter for the Australian rock band Augie March.

== Early life ==
Richards was born in Shepparton, Victoria on 29 December 1973. Richards saved up enough money to buy his first guitar by working long hours on the docks in Fremantle, Western Australia.

== With Augie March ==
Richards joined Augie March in August 1995. As of 2024 they have released two EPs and seven LPs, while Richards has released one solo album in 2010 and one EP as G.A. Richards and the Dark Satanic Mills Bros.

Richards composed the original score for the acclaimed 2023 horror film Late Night with the Devil whose directors, Colin and Cameron Cairnes, also directed several early Augie March video clips.

Glenn now lives with his family in Tasmania in West Hobart, a suburb of Hobart with views of the city, the Derwent Estuary and the surrounding suburbs.

Glenn will release his new studio album The Great Behind on Johnny Depp's In.2 record label on the 9th October 2026

== Awards and nominations ==
=== APRA Awards ===
The APRA Awards are presented annually by the Australasian Performing Right Association (APRA).

Year	Nominee / work	Award	Result
2007	"One Crowded Hour" – Glenn Richards	Song of the Year	Won
2007	Glenn Richards	Breakthrough Songwriter Award	Won

== Discography ==
=== Albums ===
List of albums, with selected details and chart positions
Title	Details	Peak chart positions
Title	Details	AUS
Glimjack	Released: 2010; Label: Sony BMG Australia	60
The Great Behind	Released 9/10/2026; Label: In.2/Cadiz Music	

=== Extended plays ===
- Closed Off, Cold & Bitter – Life as a Can of Beer (2006)
