= Pete Murray discography =

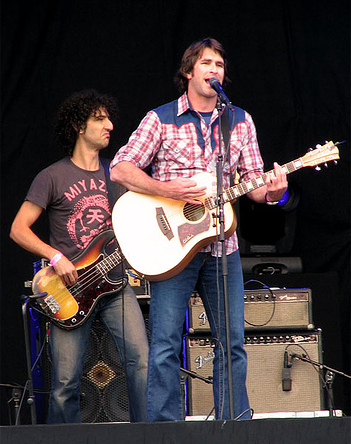
- Murray in 2006
- Studio albums: 7
- EPs: 4
- Compilation albums: 2
- Singles: 31
- Video albums: 2

Australian singer and songwriter Pete Murray has released seven studio albums, two compilation album, four extended play, and thirty-one singles (including one as part of a charity collective). Murray has sold over 1.2 million albums in Australia.

== Albums ==
=== Studio albums ===
Title	Details	Peak chart positions			Certifications (thresholds)
Title	Details	AUS	NZL	NLD	Certifications (thresholds)
The Game	Released: 2001; Label: Auxiliary	—	—	—	
Feeler	Released: 21 July 2003; Label: Sony Music Australia	1	15	53	ARIA: 7× Platinum
See the Sun	Released: 25 September 2005; Label: Sony Music Australia	1	22	87	ARIA: 5× Platinum
Summer at Eureka	Released: 16 May 2008; Label: Sony Music Australia	1	19	17	ARIA: Platinum
Blue Sky Blue	Released: 2 September 2011; Label: Sony Music Australia	6	—	—	ARIA: Gold
Camacho	Released: 2 June 2017; Label: Sony Music Australia	3	—	—	
Longing	Released: 3 October 2025; Label: Community Music	5	—	—	

=== Re-recorded studio albums ===
Title	Details	Peak chart positions
Title	Details	AUS
Blue Sky Blue "The Byron Sessions"	Released: 1 February 2013; Label: Sony Music Australia	17
Feeler (Pete's version)	Released: February 2027; Label: Pete Murray / Community Music	TBA

=== Compilation albums ===
Title	Details	Peak chart positions
Title	Details	AUS
The Night Before I Go	Released: 28 October 2022; Label: Sony Music Australia; Format: LP; Note: Compiles EPs The Night and Before I Go	—
Best of Pete Murray	Released: 19 May 2023; Label: Sony Music Australia	16

=== Video albums ===
Title	Details	Peak chart positions	Certification
Title	Details	AUS DVD	Certification
Passing Time	Released: June 2004; Label: Columbia	1	ARIA: 2× Platinum
A Year in the Sun	Released: September 2006; Label: Columbia	30	ARIA: Gold

== Extended plays ==
Title	Details	Peak chart positions
Title	Details	AUS
D Day	Released: 2001; Label: Auxiliary Records	—
The Night	Released: 5 March 2021; Label: Pete Murray	22
Before I Go	Released: 1 April 2022; Label: Pete Murray	—
Acoustic Roots Vol.1	Released: 19 May 2025; Label: Pete Murray (PMUZ002CD)	— (Note: Acoustic Roots Vol.1 did not enter the ARIA Top 100 Chart, but peaked at number 7 on the Australian Artists Album Chart.)

== Singles ==
=== As lead artist ===
Year	Title	Peak chart positions			Certifications (thresholds)	Album
Year	Title	AUS	NZL	NLD	Certifications (thresholds)	Album
2001	"Lines"	—	—	—		The Game
2003	"Feeler"	— (Note: "Feeler" was released as radio promotion single only and ineligible to chart in 2003)	—	—		Feeler
2004	"So Beautiful"	9	13	62	ARIA: Platinum; RMNZ: Gold	Feeler
2004	"Bail Me Out"	56	—	—		Feeler
2004	"Please"	33	—	—		Feeler
2005	"Better Days"	13	32	—	ARIA: Gold; RMNZ: Gold	See the Sun
2005	"Class A"	— (Note: "Class A" was released as radio promotion single only and ineligible to chart in 2005)	—	—		See the Sun
2006	"Opportunity"	29	32	—		See the Sun
2008	"You Pick Me Up"	36	—	83		Summer at Eureka
2008	"Saving Grace"	44	—	—		Summer at Eureka
2009	"Chance to Say Goodbye"	—	—	—		Summer at Eureka
2011	"Always a Winner"	38	—	—	ARIA: Gold	Blue Sky Blue
2011	"Free"	42	—	—	ARIA: Gold	Blue Sky Blue
2012	"Let You Go"	—	—	—		Blue Sky Blue
2013	"Blue Sky Blue" (featuring Fantine)	—	—	—		Blue Sky Blue "The Byron Sessions"
2017	"Take Me Down"	—	—	—		Camacho
2017	"Connected"	—	—	—		Camacho
2018	"Heartbeats"	—	—	—		Camacho
2020	"Found My Place"	—	—	—		The Night
2020	"Waiting for This Love"	—	—	—		The Night
2021	"If We Never Dance Again"	—	—	—		The Night
2021	"Hold Me Steady"	—	—	—		Before I Go
2022	"Burning Up"	—	—	—		Before I Go
2022	"You Give Me Something"	—	—	—		Before I Go
2023	"Best of Me"	—	—	—		non album single
2024	"Wouldn't It Be Good"	—	—	—		Longing
2025	"I Am Fire"	—	—	—		Longing
2025	"Home to Me"	—	—	—		Longing
2025	"Amy"	—	—	—		Longing
2025	"Higher"	—	—	—		Longing
2026	"Time to Burn" (with Casey Barnes)	—	—	—		
2026	"Feeler" (Pete's version)	—	—	—		Feeler (Pete's version)

=== Charity singles ===
Year	Title	Peak chart positions
Year	Title	AUS
2014	"This Woman's Work" (as part of Hope for Isla and Jude)	79
