= Best of Pete Murray =

Greatest hits album by Pete Murray
- Released: 19 May 2023
- Recorded: 2001–2011
- Label: Sony Music Australia

Pete Murray chronology
The Night Before I Go (2022)	Best of Pete Murray (2023)	Longing (2025)

Best of Pete Murray is the first greatest hits collection by Australian singer songwriter, Pete Murray. The album was announced on 6 February 2023 and released on 19 May 2023. The album peaked at number 16 on the ARIA Charts.

Murray said "The best of album holds so many dear memories for me, from when I first started song writing, to fine tuning my live performance and all the incredible experiences I was fortunate enough to experience along the way. The whole album is a dance down memory lane and I'm so grateful for the support fans have showed me across the world along the way."

The album was supported with the 8-date Greatest Hits Tour, commencing at Forum Theatre on 8 July 2023.

== Track listing ==
No.	Title	Writer(s)	Album	Length
1.	"Feeler" (Michael Brauer mix)	Murray	Feeler	4:22
2.	"Free"	Murray	Blue Sky Blue	3:37
3.	"Bail Me Out"	Murray	Feeler	4:04
4.	"Class A"	Murray	See the Sun	3:06
5.	"Please" (single mix)	Murray	Feeler	3:25
6.	"So Beautiful" (single mix)	Murray	Feeler	4:39
7.	"Opportunity"	Murray	See the Sun	3:38
8.	"Better Days"	Murray	See the Sun	3:44
9.	"You Pick Me Up"	Murray	Summer at Eureka	4:32
10.	"Lines"	Murray	The Game	3:03
11.	"Always a Winner"	Murray	Blue Sky Blue	4:11
12.	"Saving Grace"	Murray	Summer at Eureka	2:56

== Charts ==
Weekly chart performance for Best of Pete Murray
Chart (2023)	Peak position
Australian Albums (ARIA)	16
