= 2004 ARIA Music Awards =

Annual Australian music awards ceremony

- Date: 17 October 2004
- Venue: Sydney SuperDome, Sydney, New South Wales

Highlights
- Most wins: Jet (6)
- Most nominations: Eskimo Joe (7); Jet (7); John Butler Trio (7)
- Website: ariaawards.com.au

Television/radio coverage
- Network: Network Ten

The 18th Annual Australian Recording Industry Association Music Awards (generally known as the ARIA Music Awards or simply the ARIAs) were held on 17 October 2004 at the Sydney SuperDome within the Sydney Olympic Complex. The ceremony, hosted by Rove McManus and produced by Roving Enterprises for Network Ten, was held for the first time on a Sunday night and averaged 1.39 million viewers. The 2004 ARIA Fine Arts Awards had been presented at a ceremony weeks earlier.

== Awards ==
Winners highlighted in bold, with nominees, in plain, below them.

=== ARIA Awards ===
- Album of the Year
  - **Jet** – **Get Born**
    - Eskimo Joe – A Song Is a City
    - John Butler Trio – Sunrise Over Sea
    - Kasey Chambers – Wayward Angel
    - The Dissociatives – The Dissociatives
- Single of the Year
  - **Jet** – "**Are You Gonna Be My Girl**"
    - Eskimo Joe – "From the Sea"
    - John Butler Trio – "Zebra"
    - Missy Higgins – "Scar"
    - Pete Murray – "So Beautiful"
- Best Male Artist
  - **John Butler** – **Sunrise Over Sea**
    - Alex Lloyd – Distant Light
    - Dan Kelly – Sing the Tabloid Blues
    - Pete Murray – "So Beautiful"
    - Tim Rogers – Spit Polish
- Best Female Artist
  - **Kasey Chambers** – **Wayward Angel**
    - Delta Goodrem – "Not Me, Not I"
    - Kylie Minogue – Body Language
    - Lisa Miller – Version Originale
    - Missy Higgins – "Scar"
- Best Group
  - **Jet** – **Get Born**
    - Eskimo Joe – A Song Is a City
    - Powderfinger – "Sunsets"
    - The Cat Empire – The Cat Empire
    - The Dissociatives – The Dissociatives
- Highest-Selling Album
  - **Delta Goodrem** – **Innocent Eyes**
    - Guy Sebastian – Just as I Am
    - Jet – Get Born
    - Pete Murray – Feeler
    - Shannon Noll – That's What I'm Talking About
- Highest-Selling Single
  - **Guy Sebastian** – "**Angels Brought Me Here**"
    - Delta Goodrem – "Predictable"
    - Paulini – "Angel Eyes"
    - Shannon Noll – "What About Me?"
    - Spiderbait – "Black Betty"
- Best Breakthrough Artist – Album
  - **Jet** – **Get Born**
    - Dallas Crane – Dallas Crane
    - Dan Kelly and the Alpha Males – Sing the Tabloid Blues
    - The Cat Empire – The Cat Empire
    - Xavier Rudd – Solace
- Best Breakthrough Artist – Single
  - **Jet** – "**Are You Gonna Be My Girl**"
    - Dallas Crane – "Dirty Hearts"
    - Little Birdy – "Relapse"
    - Missy Higgins – "Scar"
    - The Cat Empire – "Days Like These"
- Best Adult Contemporary Album
  - **Paul Kelly** – **Ways & Means**
    - Diesel – Singled Out
    - george – Unity
    - Jimmy Little – Life's What You Make It
    - Lisa Miller – Version Originale
- Best Blues & Roots Album
  - **John Butler Trio** – **Sunrise Over Sea**
    - Ash Grunwald – I Don't Believe
    - Jeff Lang – Whatever Makes You Happy
    - Jim Conway's Big Wheel – Little Story
    - Xavier Rudd – Solace
- Best Children's Album
  - **Hi-5 – Holiday**
    - Amica – Life Is Fun
    - The Hooley Dooleys – Wonderful
    - The Saddle Club – Friends Forever
    - The Wiggles – Top of the Tots
- Best Comedy Release
  - **Scared Weird Little Guys** – **Bits and Pieces**
    - Lee Perry & Gary Eck – The Hollywood Motel
    - Reg Reagan – Am I Ever Gonna See the Biff Again?
    - Tripod – About an Hour of Song in an Hour...Again
    - Tripod – Live – Fegh Maha
- Best Country Album
  - **Kasey Chambers** – **Wayward Angel**
    - Adam Brand – Get Loud
    - Melinda Schneider – Family Tree
    - Slim Dusty – Columbia Lane – the Last Sessions
    - Troy Cassar-Daley – Borrowed & Blue
- Best Dance Release
  - **Infusion – "Girls Can Be Cruel**"
    - Cam Farrar – Wasted
    - Cut Copy – "Future"
    - NuBreed – The Original
    - Mr Timothy – "I Am Tha 1"
- Best Independent Release
  - **John Butler Trio** – **Sunrise Over Sea**
    - Butterfingers – Breakfast at Fatboys
    - Dan Kelly and the Alpha Males – Sing the Tabloid Blues
    - Jebediah – Braxton Hicks
    - The Waifs – "Bridal Train"
- Best Music DVD
  - **Midnight Oil** – **Best of Both Worlds**
    - Grinspoon – 23 Hours of Waiting Around
    - INXS – I'm Only Looking
    - Pete Murray – Passing Time
    - You Am I – The Cream & the Crock
- Best Pop Release
  - **Missy Higgins** – "**Scar**"
    - Delta Goodrem – "Not Me, Not I"
    - The Dissociatives – The Dissociatives
    - Kylie Minogue – Body Language
    - Pete Murray – "So Beautiful"
- Best Rock Album
  - **Jet** – **Get Born**
    - Dallas Crane – Dallas Crane
    - Eskimo Joe – A Song Is a City
    - Spiderbait – Tonight Alright
    - The Living End – Modern Artillery
- Best Urban Release
  - **Koolism** – **Part 3 – Random Thoughts**
    - 1200 Techniques – Consistency Theory
    - Daniel Merriweather – "City Rules"
    - J-Wess – J Wess Presents tha LP
    - The Cat Empire – The Cat Empire

=== Artisan Awards ===
- Best Cover Art
  - **James Hackett** – **The Dissociatives** – **The Dissociatives**
    - James Bellesini, Love Police – The Vines – Winning Days; You Am I – The Cream & the Crock
    - Mathematics – Kasey Chambers – Wayward Angel
    - Peter Barrett & Eskimo Joe – Eskimo Joe – A Song Is a City
    - Tom Walker – John Butler Trio – Sunrise Over Sea
- Best Video
  - **James Hackett** – **The Dissociatives** – "**Somewhere Down the Barrel**"
    - Claudia Castle – Pete Murray – "So Beautiful"
    - Nash Edgerton – The Sleepy Jackson – "Good Dancers"
    - Paul Butler, Scott Walton & 50/50 – Spiderbait – "Black Betty"
    - Squareyed Films – Missy Higgins – "Scar"
- Engineer of the Year
  - **Paul McKercher**, **Eskimo Joe** – **Eskimo Joe** – **A Song Is a City**
    - Andy Baldwin – The Cat Empire – The Cat Empire
    - Brent Clark – Alex Lloyd – Distant Light
    - Matt Lovell – Jebediah – Braxton Hicks
    - Phil McKellar – Sunk Loto – Between Birth and Death
    - Robyn Mai – John Butler Trio – Sunrise Over Sea
- Producer of the Year
  - **Paul McKercher**, **Eskimo Joe** – **Eskimo Joe** – **A Song Is a City**
    - Andy Baldwin & The Cat Empire – The Cat Empire – The Cat Empire
    - Daniel Johns & Paul Mac – The Dissociatives – The Dissociatives
    - John Butler – John Butler Trio – Sunrise Over Sea
    - Paul McKercher & Pete Murray – Pete Murray – "So Beautiful"

=== Fine Arts Awards ===
For the first time, in 2004, the ARIA Fine Arts Awards were presented at a separate ceremony held weeks earlier.

- Best Classical Album
  - **Teddy Tahu Rhodes** – **The Voice**
    - Diana Doherty – Souvenirs
    - Gerard Willems, Sinfonia Australis – Beethoven Complete Piano Concertos
    - Sara Macliver, Sally-Anne Russell – Bach Arias and Duets
    - William Barton, Queensland Orchestra – Sculthorpe:Songs of Sea and Sky
- Best Jazz Album
  - **The Necks** – **Drive By**
    - Alister Spence Trio – Flux
    - Michelle Nicolle – The Crying Game
    - Mike Nock's Big Small Band – Big Small Band Live
    - Paul Grabowsky – Tales of Time and Space
- Best Original Soundtrack / Cast / Show Recording
  - **David Bridie** – **Nautical Forlorn**
    - Australian Chamber Orchestra – Musical Renegades
    - Decoder Ring – Somersault (original soundtrack)
    - Elizabeth Drake – Japanese Story
    - Various – Australian Idol Final 12
- Best World Music Album
  - **Seaman Dan** – **Perfect Pearl**
    - Jane Rutter, Slava Grigoryan – Brazil
    - Joseph Tawadros – Storyteller
    - Mohamed Bangoura – Djembe Kan
    - Saltwater Band – Djarridjarri – Blue Flag

== ARIA Hall of Fame inductee ==
- Little River Band

1970s members of Little River Band: Beeb Birtles, David Briggs, Graeham Goble, George McArdle, Derek Pellicci and Glenn Shorrock, were inducted into the Hall of Fame. The later members including fellow Australian, John Farnham, and US-based musicians, were not included in this induction. Due to a 2002 legal ruling on their right to use the band's name—two US-based members held the trademark—they performed as Classic Lineup of the Little River Band or Little River Band – Classic Lineup (sources vary). Shorrock had already been inducted into the Hall of Fame in 1991 and Farnham was inducted, for his solo work, in 2003.

== Performers ==
The following artists performed on stage during the 2004 ARIA Awards:

- Delta Goodrem
- Eskimo Joe
- Guy Sebastian
- Kasey Chambers
- Jet
- John Butler Trio
- Missy Higgins
- Pete Murray
- Shannon Noll
- Spiderbait

== Channel V Oz Artist of the Year award ==
- Guy Sebastian
  - Jet
  - Delta Goodrem
  - Grinspoon
  - John Butler Trio

== See also ==
- Music of Australia
- Rock music in Australia
