= MTV Australia Video Music Awards 2005 =

First MTV Australia Video Music Awards

2005 MTV Australia Video Music Awards
- Date: 3 March 2005
- Location: The Big Top
- Hosted by: The Osbournes

Television/radio coverage
- Network: MTV Australia

The first Annual MTV Australia Video Music Awards were held on 3 March 2005 at The Big Top Sydney. They were broadcast live on MTV Australia and throughout the world. The event, which followed a Circus Theme, was hosted by The Osbournes.

On the night Punk Rock band Green Day performed two of their hit songs American Idiot and Boulevard of Broken Dreams, Natalie Imbruglia performed her new single Shiver for the first time live, Carmen Electra performed a strip tease, and Kelly Osbourne premiered her new single One Word.

== Background ==
The establishment of the MTV Australia Video Music Awards ceremony was proposed in 2004 with Australia becoming the seventeenth country to host its own MTV award show. Nominees were announced in December of that year with the inaugural ceremony following in March 2005 as hosted by Sharon and Ozzy Osbourne. The thirteen categories are Video of the Year, Best Male Artist, Best Female Artist, Breakthrough Artist, Best Group, Best Dance Video, Best Pop Video, Best Rock Video, Best R&B Video, Sexiest Video and Best Dressed Video.

== Performers ==
- Simple Plan
- Kelly Osbourne
- Eskimo Joe
- Chingy
- Ja Rule
- Natalie Imbruglia
- Carmen Electra
- Bryan Adams/Shannon Noll
- Delta Goodrem/Brian McFadden
- Grinspoon
- Missy Higgins
- Xzibit
- Green Day
- The Dissociatives

== Presenters ==
- Dannii Minogue
- Anna Nicole Smith
- David Campbell
- Zoe Sheridan
- Gretel Killeen
- Effie
- Shannon Watts
- Nitty
- Keith Urban
- Natalie Bassingthwaighte
- Kelly Slater

== Nominees and winners ==
The winners are in bold.

=== Video of the Year ===
- Eminem — "Just Lose It"
- Gwen Stefani — "What You Waiting For?"
- **The Dissociatives — "Somewhere Down The Barrel"**
- Outkast — "Roses"

=== Best Male ===
- Eminem
- **Shannon Noll**
- Robbie Williams
- Usher

=== Best Female ===
- Missy Higgins
- Gwen Stefani
- **Delta Goodrem**
- Britney Spears

=== Best Group ===
- **Green Day** — "American Idiot"
- Powderfinger — "Sunsets"
- Outkast — "Roses"
- Jet — "Cold Hard Bitch"

=== Best Breakthrough ===
- **Missy Higgins**
- Maroon 5
- Franz Ferdinand
- Thirsty Merc

=== Best Rock Video ===
- **Green Day — "American Idiot"**
- Jet — "Cold Hard Bitch"
- Spiderbait — "Black Betty"
- U2 — "Vertigo"

=== Best Pop Video ===
- Ashlee Simpson — "Pieces of Me"
- Delta Goodrem — "Out of the Blue"
- **Guy Sebastian — "Out with My Baby"**
- Gwen Stefani — "What You Waiting For?"

=== Best Dance Video ===
- Britney Spears — "Toxic"
- Fatboy Slim — "Slash Dot Dash"
- Freestylers — "Push Up"
- **Usher — "Yeah!"**

=== Best R&B Video ===
- Beyoncé — "Naughty Girl"
- **The Black Eyed Peas — "Hey Mama"**
- J-Wess — "Luv Ya"
- Outkast — "Roses"

=== Sexiest Video ===
- Beyoncé — "Naughty Girl"
- **The Black Eyed Peas — "Hey Mama"**
- Britney Spears — "Toxic"
- Robbie Williams — "Radio"

=== Best Dressed Video ===
- **Gwen Stefani — "What You Waiting For?"**
- Delta Goodrem — "Out of the Blue"
- Kylie Minogue — "Chocolate"
- Outkast — "Roses"

=== Pepsi Viewers Choice ===
- Delta Goodrem

=== Supernova Award ===
- **Evermore**
- Joel Turner
- Missy Higgins
- Anthony Callea

=== VH1 Music First Award ===
- Cher

=== Free Your Mind Award ===
- AusAID

== Award moments ==
- The Red Carpet was the longest in the Southern Hemisphere and the longest ever used for an MTV Award Ceremony.
- Anna Nicole Smith removed her top while presenting.
