= Blue Sky Blue =

Blue Sky Blue may refer to:

- "Blue Sky Blue" (Feeder song), 2019
- "Blue Sky Blue" (Rythem song), 2003
- Blue Sky Blue (album), a 2011 studio album by Pete Murray, or its title track
- Blue Sky Blue "The Byron Sessions", a 2013 studio album by Murray
