= Luv Ya =

Single by J-Wess featuring Kulaia & Digga

from the album J-Wess Presents Tha LP
- Released: 2004
- Recorded: 2003
- Genre: Pop, R&B
- Length: 4:21
- Label: Mushroom
- Songwriters: J. Essex, A. Naitoko, A. Gardner

J-Wess singles chronology
"What Chu Want" (2003)	"Luv Ya" (2004)

"Luv Ya" is a pop/R&B song released by American-Australian urban artist J-Wess in early 2004, from his album J-Wess Presents Tha LP (2004). "Luv Ya" features vocals by Kulaia and MC Digga who both appear on J-Wess' previous singles "Bang This" and "What Chu Want". "Luv Ya" was released as the album's third and final single, and reached a peak position of number fifteen on the Australian ARIA singles chart. It remained on the ARIA charts for five weeks. Unlike its predecessors, it failed to chart on the New Zealand RIANZ singles chart. In 2005, it was nominated for the MTV Australian Video Music Awards for Best R&B video.

== Track listing ==
1. "Luv Ya"
2. "Luv Ya" (Remix Edit)
3. "Luv Ya" (Remix Extended)
4. "Luv Ya" (Video)
5. "What Chu Want" (Video)

== Charts ==
Chart performance for "Luv Ya"
Chart (2004)	Peak position
Australia (ARIA)	15
