= Young Man, Old Man (You Ain't Better Than the Rest) =

2004 single by The Dissociatives

Single by The Dissociatives

from the album The Dissociatives
- Released: May 2004
- Length: 4:04
- Label: Eleven: A Music Company
- Songwriter(s): Paul Mac, Daniel Johns
- Producer(s): Paul Mac, Daniel Johns

The Dissociatives singles chronology
"Somewhere Down the Barrel" (2004)	"Young Man, Old Man (You Ain't Better Than the Rest)" (2004)	"Horror with Eyeballs" (2004)

"Young Man, Old Man (You Ain't Better Than the Rest)" is a song recorded by Australian band The Dissociatives. The song was released in May 2004 as the second single from the band's self-titled studio album. "Young Man, Old Man (You Ain't Better Than the Rest)" peaked at number 46 on the Australian ARIA Charts.

At the APRA Music Awards of 2005, the song was nominated for song of the year.

== Track listing ==
1. "Young Man, Old Man (You Ain't Better Than the Rest)" - 4:04
2. "Much Preferred Customers" (The Presets remix) - 4:28
3. "Lifting the Veil from the Braille" (Ubin remix) - 5:00
4. "Paris Circa 2007/08" (Hermitude Remix) - 4:04

== Charts ==
Chart (2004)	Peak position
Australia (ARIA)	46

== Release history ==
Country	Date	Format	Label	Catalogue
Australia	May 2004	CD Single	Eleven: A Music Company	ELEVENCD25
