= Car Tape 2 =

Studio album by Lisa Miller
- Released: April 24, 2010
- Label: Raoul Records

Lisa Miller chronology
Morning in the Bowl of Night (2007)	Car Tape 2 (2010)	Meet the Misses (2012)

Car Tape 2 is a 2010 album by the Australian singer-songwriter Lisa Miller. It was the follow-up to 2002's Car Tape. It was released in Australia on 24 April 2010 by Raoul Records and Other Tongues. Car Tape 2 was, like Miller's three previous albums, nominated in the ARIA Awards for "Best Adult Contemporary Album".
