= Morning in the Bowl of Night =

Studio album by Lisa Miller
- Released: 21 April 2007
- Recorded: 2006
- Genre: Rock
- Label: Raoul
- Producer: Shane O'Mara

Lisa Miller chronology
Version Originale	Morning in the Bowl of Night	Car Tape 2

Morning in the Bowl of Night is the fifth album by Melbourne singer-songwriter Lisa Miller. All songs were composed by Miller. The album peaked at number 14 on the Australian heatseakers.

It was released in Australia on 21 April 2007, and was nominated in the 2007 ARIA Awards for "Best Adult Contemporary Album".

== Track listing ==
1. Upside
2. Such a Find
3. Snowman
4. (She's a) Shining Star
5. Point Ormond
6. Amused & Confused
7. Bottle Up My Tears (prologue)
8. Bottle Up My Tears
9. Motherless
10. Love Will Carry You
11. Lucky Dip Roses
