= Quiet Girl with a Credit Card =

Studio album by Lisa Miller
- Released: 1996
- Genre: Rock
- Label: W.Minc
- Producer: Graham Lee

Lisa Miller chronology
Quiet Girl with a Credit Card	As Far as a Life Goes

Quiet Girl with a Credit Card is the debut album from Australian singer-songwriter Lisa Miller. It was released in Australia in 1996 on the W.Minc label and licensed for release in Europe by Demon Records. It was produced by Graham Lee (ex-The Triffids) who had previously played pedal steel guitar in Lisa's roots-rock band Truckasaurus.

The album features Lisa's own compositions, plus two songs by Melbourne friends (one each from Dave Graney and Conway Savage), and two US classics: Bob Dylan's "You're a Big Girl Now" and Dan Penn's "Woman Left Lonely".

== Track listing ==
1. "Big American Car"
2. "You're a Big Girl Now" (Bob Dylan)
3. "Guitar Boat"
4. "Nobody's An Angel"
5. "I'm Gonna Live My Life (I'm Gonna Take My Time)" (Dave Graney)
6. "Hang My Head"
7. "Woman Left Lonely" (Dan Penn/Spooner Oldham)
8. "False Waltz"
9. "Long Wide Load"
10. "Too Dark To See" (Conway Savage)
11. "Big Small Town"

All compositions by Lisa Miller except where noted.
