= Sailing Home =

Studio album by Seaman Dan
- Released: 2009
- Length: 44:05
- Label: Steady Steady Music
- Producer: Karl Neuenfeldt, Nigel Pegrum

Seaman Dan chronology
Somewhere There's an Island (2007)	Sailing Home (2009)	Sunnyside (2011)

Sailing Home is the fifth studio album by Australian musician, Seaman Dan. The album was released in 2003.

At the ARIA Music Awards of 2009, the album won the ARIA Award for Best World Music Album.

== Track listing ==
1. "Sailing the Southeast Wind"
2. "Lighthouse"
3. "Mango Rain"
4. "The Florida Sails Again"
5. "Dock of the Bay"
6. "Shimmering Blue"
7. "Water"
8. "Full Fathom Five"
9. "Baba Waiar"
10. "Mak Taim"
11. "Saltwater Cowboy"
