= Blue Sky Blue "The Byron Sessions" =

Studio album by Pete Murray
- Released: 1 February 2013
- Label: Sony BMG Australia

Pete Murray chronology
Blue Sky Blue (2011)	Blue Sky Blue "The Byron Sessions" (2013)	Camacho (2017)

Singles from Blue Sky Blue "The Byron Sessions"
- 1. "Blue Sky Blue" Released: 15 January 2013

Blue Sky Blue is a re-recording of the fifth studio album by Australian rock musician Pete Murray. The album was released on 1 February 2013 peaked at number 17 on the ARIA Charts. The album is a reworking Murray's 2011 album Blue Sky Blue with Murray re-recording the album featuring fellow Australian musicians.

== Track listing ==
All tracks are written by Pete Murray.

No.	Title	Length
1.	"Blue Sky Blue" (featuring Fantine)	3:41
2.	"Always a Winner"	3:52
3.	"Hurricane Coming" (featuring Ash Grunwald)	3:49
4.	"Free" (featuring Busby Marou)	3:13
5.	"Led" (featuring Bernard Fanning)	3:46
6.	"Let You Go" (featuring Busby Marou)	4:46
7.	"Broken"	3:46
8.	"H.O.L.L.A.N.D." (featuring Darren Middleton)	4:36
9.	"Tattoo Stained"	3:33
10.	"Hold It All for Love" (featuring Katie Noonan)	4:48

== Charts ==
Chart (2013)	Peak position
Australian Albums (ARIA)	17
