= What Chu Want =

Single by J-Wess featuring Lolly, Kulaia & MC Digga

from the album J-Wess Presents Tha LP
- Released: November 17, 2003
- Recorded: 2003
- Genre: Pop, R&B
- Length: 3:45
- Label: Mushroom

J-Wess singles chronology
| "Bang This" (2003) | "What Chu Want" (2003) | "Luv Ya" (2004) |

"What Chu Want" is a pop-R&B song performed by American-Australian urban artist J-Wess featuring Kulaia, Lolly and MC Digga. The single was released in late 2003 as the second single from his debut album, J-Wess Presents Tha LP (2004). "What Chu Want" debuted at number twenty-five on the Australian ARIA Singles Chart, and peaked at number ten, becoming J-Wess' first top ten single. Subsequently, it spent a total of twenty-two weeks on the chart and was certified gold by ARIA for sales in excess of 35,000 copies. It is J-Wess' most successful single. In New Zealand, "What chu want" peaked at number thirty-four on the RIANZ Singles Chart, becoming J-Wess' second single to peak within the top forty, and his highest charting single there as well.

== Track listing ==
1. What Chu Want (Radio Edit) 3:47
2. What Chu Want (Club Mix) 4:05
3. What Chu Want (Art Of Sound Remix) 3:25
4. What Chu Want (Weapon X Remix) 3:33
5. What Chu Want (Agent 86 Remix) 5:39
6. What Chu Want (Elite Fleet Remix) 3:58
7. What Chu Want (Damion Remix) 3:56

== Charts ==
=== Weekly charts ===
| Chart (2003–04) | Peak position |
|---|---|
| Australia (ARIA) | 10 |
| Australian Urban (ARIA) | 6 |
| New Zealand (Recorded Music NZ) | 34 |

=== Year-end charts ===
| Chart (2004) | Position |
|---|---|
| Australia (ARIA) | 55 |
