= Seaman Dan =

Australian singer (1929–2020)

Seaman Dan AM
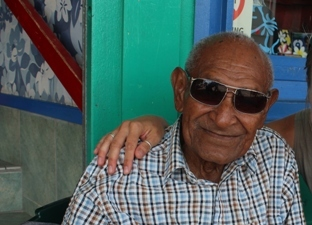

Background information
- Born: Henry Gibson Dan; 25 August 1929; Thursday Island, Torres Strait Islands, Queensland, Australia
- Died: 30 December 2020 (aged 91) Edmonton, Queensland, Australia
- Genres: Folk; jazz; hula
- Occupations: Singer-songwriter, musician
- Instrument: Guitar
- Years active: 1990s–2016
- Labels: Hot Records; Steady Steady Music

Henry Gibson Dan AM (25 August 1929 – 30 December 2020), known as Seaman Dan, was a Torres Strait Islander singer-songwriter and musician with a national and international reputation. After years of performing gigs, he released his first recording, an album called Follow the Sun, in 2000, on his 70th birthday.

== Early life ==
Dan was born as Henry Gibson Dan on 25 August 1929 in the general hospital on Thursday Island in the Torres Strait Islands Region of Far North Queensland, Australia. He was of Melanesian, Polynesian and African American descent. His great-grandfather was a sailor from Kingston, Jamaica in the West Indies, and his great-grandmother a chief's daughter from New Caledonia. Another grandfather came from the island of Niue in Polynesia.

== Early career ==
Dan started his early years mustering cattle in Cape York, and had aspiration's of joining the navy. In the late 1940s, 1950s and 1960s, Dan worked as a boat captain and pearl diver, gathering pearl and trochus shells across the north of Australia. He also did jobs such as mineral prospecting and taxi driving.

== Music career ==
Dan's singing came from family, friends and associating with talented musicians in his multi-cultural maritime working life, creating a fusion of music from Australia, Melanesia, North America, Africa and Polynesia, notably the Thursday Island "hula" style. He was a regular performer at Thursday Island's local hotels and a community musician for decades.

His first album, Follow the Sun, was released in 2000, on his 70th birthday.

He performed in Japan and throughout Australia, most notably at the National Folk Festival, Port Fairy Folk Festival, Darwin Festival, Adelaide and Adelaide Fringe Festivals, Laura Dance and Music Festival, Tasmania's 10 Days on the Island Festival, NAIDOC Ball, and at the National Museum of Australia's Tracking Kultja Festival.

In 2010, Dan semi-retired at the age of 80 years.

== Recognition ==
His album Perfect Pearl won the ARIA Award for Best World Music Album in 2004, and in 2009 won again with Sailing Home.

In its citation on awarding Dan the Australia Council for the Arts Red Ochre Award in 2005 for his outstanding contribution to the development and recognition of Aboriginal and Torres Strait Islander arts and culture, the Council claimed he was a charismatic and consummate performer who blended traditional Torres Strait Islander and pearling songs with jazz, hula and blues.

In 2013, he received a Hall of Fame Award at the National Indigenous Music Awards in Darwin, Northern Territory.

In 2019 Seaman Dan was honoured at the Queensland Music Awards with the Grant McLennan Lifetime Achievement Award.

== Death ==
Dan died in Edmonton, Queensland on 30 December 2020, aged 91.

== Discography ==
=== Studio albums ===
Title	Details
Follow the Sun	Release date: 2000; Label: Hot Records (HOT 1075); Formats: CD
Steady, Steady	Release date: 2002; Label: Hot Records (HOT 1079); Formats: CD
Perfect Pearl	Release date: 2004; Label: Hot Records (HOT 1094); Formats: CD
Island Way	Release date: 2006; Label: Steady Steady Music (TI 1001); Formats: CD, DD
Sailing Home	Release date: 2009; Label: Steady Steady Music (TI 1004); Formats: CD, DD
Sunnyside	Release date: 2012; Label: Steady Steady Music (TI 1007); Formats: CD, DD
A Caribbean Songbook	Release date: 2014; Label: Steady Steady Music (TI 1010); Formats: CD, DD
An Old Man of the Sea	Release date: 2016; Label: Steady Steady Music (TI 1011); Formats: CD, DD

=== Compilation albums ===
Title	Details
Somewhere There's an Island-Best of 1999–2006	Release date: 2007; Label: Steady Steady Music (TI 1002); Formats: CD, DD
Still on Deck: Personal Favourites	Release date: 2013; Label: Steady Steady Music (TI 1008); Formats: CD, DD

== Awards and nominations ==
Dan was appointed a Member of the Order of Australia in the 2020 Australia Day Honours.

=== ARIA Music Awards ===
The ARIA Music Awards is an annual awards ceremony that recognises excellence, innovation, and achievement across all genres of Australian music. Seaman Dan won two awards from four nominations.

Year	Nominee / work	Award	Result
2004	Perfect Pearl	Best World Music Album	Won
2006	Island Way	Best World Music Album	Nominated
2009	Sailing Home	Best World Music Album	Won
2016	An Old Man of the Sea	Best World Music Album	Nominated

=== Australia Council for the Arts ===
The Australia Council for the Arts is the arts funding and advisory body for the Government of Australia. Since 1993, it has awarded a Red Ochre Award. It is presented to an outstanding Indigenous Australian (Aboriginal Australian or Torres Strait Islander) artist for lifetime achievement.

Year	Nominee / work	Award	Result
2005	himself	Red Ochre Award	Awarded

=== National Indigenous Music Awards ===
The National Indigenous Music Awards (NIMA) recognise excellence, dedication, innovation and outstanding contribution to the Northern Territory music industry. They commenced in 2004.

Year	Nominee / work	Award	Result
2013	himself	Hall of Fame Inductee	Inductee

=== Queensland Music Awards ===
The Queensland Music Awards (previously known as Q Song Awards) are annual awards celebrating Queensland, Australia's brightest emerging artists and established legends. They commenced in 2006.

Year	Nominee / work	Award	Result (wins only)
2019	himself	Grant McLennan Lifetime Achievement Award	awarded
