= Perfect Pearl =

Studio album by Seaman Dan
- Released: 2003
- Label: Hot Records

Seaman Dan chronology
Steady, Steady (2002)	Perfect Pearl (2003)	Island Way (2006)

Perfect Pearl is the third studio album by Australian musician, Seaman Dan. The album was released in 2003.

At the ARIA Music Awards of 2004, the album won the ARIA Award for Best World Music Album.

== Track listing ==
1. "Going Back Home" - 3:19
2. "Waiting for the Iceman" - 3:42
3. "Perfect Pearl" - 3:22
4. "Frangipani" - 3:02
5. "Red Shirt Day" - 3:21
6. "T.I.Taxi Driver" - 3:37
7. "Watching the Weather" - 3:58
8. "Veiga, Veiga" - 3:34
9. "The Ukulele Waltz" - 4:09
10. "Magic Carpet of Pearls" - 3:21
11. "Minna Murra Moon" - 4:04
12. "Islander Drums/Warraber" - 3:22
