= Society Anxiety =

EP by Sunk Loto
- Released: 26 November 1999
- Recorded: 1999
- Studio: Festival's Studio, Sydney
- Genre: Nu metal; alternative metal; rap metal
- Length: 19:09
- Label: Epic/Sony BMG
- Producer: Paul McKercher

Sunk Loto chronology
Society Anxiety (1999)	Big Picture Lies (2000)

Society Anxiety is the debut extended play by Australian nu metal band Sunk Loto. Released in November 1999, it peaked at No. 40 on the ARIA Singles Chart.

== Background ==
In April 1999 Gold Coast, Queensland nu metal quartet Sunk Loto signed with Epic Records/Sony BMG Music Entertainment. Their youngest member Dane Brown (drums) was 13 and the oldest, Sean Van Gennip (bass guitar), was 17; others were Dane's older brother Jason Brown (lead vocals) and Luke McDonald (lead guitar). In November that year, they released a five-track extended play, Society Anxiety, which was produced by Paul McKercher (the Cruel Sea, Spiderbait).

Society Anxiety peaked in the ARIA Singles Chart top 40. Justin Donnelly of Blistering described its sound "it was predictable. There wasn't much in the way of pushing the envelope song wise, and while the nu-metal angle is now a bit contrived, it was a sound that typified the time." The administrator of Beatdust felt it "pays homage to its inspirations – elements of both Evil Empire era RATM and Deftones Around the Fur are heavily evident both musically and sonically throughout." The lead track, "Vinegar Stroke", became a radio favourite. The band performed at a range of festivals including Homebake promoting the EP.

== Track listing ==
All tracks are written by Luke McDonald, Jason Brown, Dane Brown, Sean Van Gennip, unless otherwise noted

No.	Title	Length
1.	"Vinegar Stroke"	3:26
2.	"Porcelain Buddah"	3:46
3.	"Lift"	3:45
4.	"Submission"	4:35
5.	"Blunt"	3:37

== Charts ==
Chart (1999)	Peak position
Australia (ARIA)	40
