= Sunk Loto =

Australian metal band

- Also known as: Messiah
- Origin: Gold Coast, Queensland, Australia
- Genres: Nu metal; alternative metal; alternative rock; rap metal
- Years active: 1997–2007; 2022–present
- Label: Sony
- Members: Jason Brown; Dane Brown; Sean Van Gennip; Rohan Stevenson
- Past members: Luke McDonald; Miles Matheson; Adam Cox; Rob Kaay

Sunk Loto are an Australian nu metal / alternative metal band formed in Gold Coast, Queensland in 1997. The band's founding members are Dane Brown on drums, his brother Jason Brown on vocals, Luke McDonald on guitar and Sean Van Gennip on bass guitar. Sunk Loto signed a recording contract with Sony Music Australia when the members' average age was 16 years. They released two studio albums, Big Picture Lies (13 October 2000) and Between Birth and Death (17 November 2003); both reached the ARIA Albums Chart top 50. Sunk Loto toured internationally between 1997 and 2007 headlining their own shows, appearing at major festivals such as The Big Day Out and Livid, and playing alongside international bands such as Sevendust, Korn and Deftones. The group disbanded in December 2007, and after a 15-year hiatus the original members re-formed the band in 2022 and have since performed around Australia with 2 sold out national tours, and released their first new song in 20 years “The Gallows Wait” with new guitarist Rohan Stevenson after announcing they had parted ways with Luke McDonald. The band have announced they intend to release new music and continue touring.

== History ==
=== 1997–1999: Formation and Society Anxiety ===
Sunk Loto formed as a heavy metal band, Messiah, in the Gold Coast, Queensland in March 1997 by Dane Brown on drums, his brother Jason Brown on lead vocals, Luke McDonald on guitar and Miles Matheson on bass guitar. Originally named Messiah, Jason Brown had met Luke McDonald at a local music store. Jason brought his younger brother Dane to practice sessions and McDonald's school mate, Sean Van Gennip joined the band when Miles decided to part ways, completing the new line-up. A year later they changed their name due to a London band of that name: Jason explained "we looked up Messiah in the dictionary and one of the meanings was 'liberators of the oppressed' so we took the first letter of each word to form LOTO and SUNK from the sinking of the first name."

In April 1999, the group signed with Epic Records when Dane was 13 and the band's oldest member, Van Gennip, was 17. In November that year, they released a five-track extended play, Society Anxiety, which was produced by Paul McKercher (the Cruel Sea, Spiderbait). It peaked in the ARIA Singles Chart top 40 at number 40. Justin Donnelly of Blistering described their early sound "it was predictable. There wasn't much in the way of pushing the envelope song wise, and while the nu-metal angle is now a bit contrived, it was a sound that typified the time." The administrator of Beatdust felt it "pays homage to its inspirations – elements of both Evil Empire era RATM and Deftones Around the Fur are heavily evident both musically and sonically throughout." The lead track, "Vinegar Stroke", became a radio favourite. The band performed at a range of festivals including Homebake, Big Day Out and Offshore. They then scored their first national tour in mid 2000 which a 5 week touro of Australia supporting the Testeagles. They then commenced writing and recording their debut studio album Big Picture Lies.

=== 2000–2007: Big Picture Lies to Between Birth and Death ===
From 2000 to 2002 Adam Cox joined the band's live roster as their DJ, sampler and keyboardist. Sunk Loto issued their debut album, Big Picture Lies (October 2000), with McKercher again as producer, in Sydney. The band travelled to New York studio RPM to have it mixed by Michael Barbiero (Guns n Roses). It peaked at No. 30 on the ARIA Albums Chart. According to Australian music journalist, Ed Nimmervoll, they were "never really happy with [the album]. They'd been rushed. They knew the songs could have been better if they'd had more time." It was dubbed, "competent but disappointing", by Beatdust's administrator. The Post's Sam Bartlett observed, "[it] is all over the shop, suggesting a promising future, while summing up the coagulation of influences from hip-hop, rock, metal and even classical."

Tim Cashmere of radioundercover.com felt it was "good work" and that unlike many contemporaries, the lead singer, "Jason does have a fairly decent voice." However Cashmere was disappointed by the limited edition's bonus CD-ROM, which was "difficult to navigate, contentless, jerky horse poo." The album's lead single, "Make You Feel" (August 2000), peaked at No. 33 on the ARIA Singles Chart and was followed in December by "Sunken Eyes", which reached the top 100. Cashmere described the former as being reminiscent of Korn and praised Jason's vocals on the latter. Sunk Loto joined the Big Day Out tour in 2001, and also toured extensively for the following two years.

Dom Alessio of Who the Hell noticed "They were being pushed by their label to be the next Silverchair." The group decided to improve the standard of song writing for their next album. Besides taking time with their song writing they faced personal hardships including the death of a friend, drug addiction, divorce and their equipment being stolen. The group rejected a number of demos, Jason recalled, "We've just been writing music pretty much and it just took us a while. We kept coming up with demos and they weren't good enough. We just knew we could do better."

On 17 November 2003 they issued their second album, Between Birth and Death, a significantly darker and heavier effort with Phil McKellar (Grinspoon, Silverchair, Spiderbait) producing. It peaked at number 48 on the ARIA Albums Chart, No. 13 on the ARIA Australasian Artists and No. 4 on the ARIA Heavy Rock & Metal chart. Its lead single, "Everything Everyway", had appeared in October 2003, and reached the top 50 on the ARIA Singles Chart. At the ARIA Music Awards of 2004, McKellar was nominated for ARIA Award for Engineer of the Year for his work on Between Birth and Death.

Alessio observed, "the band were struggling with a falling popularity, as well as dealing with managers who were ripping them off. Then the SonyBMG merger resulted in Sunk being dropped from the label." In 2006 Sean Van Gennip departed the band due to creative differences and was replaced on bass guitar by Rob Kaay (ex-Full Scale). The band finished a short Australian tour at the end of that year and planned to record their third studio album. McDonald wanted to "take their sound down an even darker path." Dane, Jason and Kaay decided in May 2007 to work on a new project without McDonald, due to irreparable creative and personal reasons. Sunk Loto played their final show at the Hard Rock Hotel, Gold Coast on 14 December 2007.

The Brown brothers and Kaay formed a new band, the Flood, which was short-lived. Some of their tracks appeared on Kaay's Soundcloud page. Jason and Dane Brown later created Electric Horse with ex-members of fellow Gold Coast band, Lump. Electric Horse issued an EP, Translations (2010), and a studio album, Venomous (2013). McDonald was briefly a member of another Gold Coast group, Miacarla, before leaving the music industry.

=== 2022–present: Reformation ===
After 15 years of being on hiatus, the band's founding members, Luke Mcdonald, Sean Van Gennip, Jason Brown & Dane Brown decided to reform Sunk Loto in 2022. The band announced three shows in SE Queensland that immediately sold out and further touring was announced for later in 2022.

The band announced on 22 August 2023 that guitarist and co-founder Luke McDonald was no longer in the band. On September 4, 2023, Rohan Stevenson of Melbourne instrumental band 'I Built The Sky' was announced as McDonald's replacement, taking up lead guitar duties as a fulltime member of the band. On 3 October 2023, the band officially released the track The Gallows Wait, their first new music in almost 20 years.

== Band members ==
Current members

- Jason Brown – lead vocals (1997–2007, 2022–present), rhythm guitar (2003–2007, 2022–present), bass guitar (1997–1998)
- Dane Brown – drums (1997–2007, 2022–present)
- Sean Van Gennip – bass guitar (1998–2006, 2022–present)
- Rohan Stevenson – lead guitar (2023–present)

Former members

- Luke McDonald – lead guitar (1997–2007, 2022–2023), backing vocals (2003–2007, 2022–2023), rhythm guitar (1997–2003)
- Miles Matheson – bass guitar (1997)
- Adam Cox – turntables, sampler, keyboards (2000–2002; touring)
- Rob Kaay – bass guitar (2006–2007)

Timeline

== Discography ==
=== Albums ===
List of studio albums, with release date and chart position shown
Title	Album details	Peak chart positions
Title	Album details	AUS
Big Picture Lies	Released: 13 October 2000; Label: Epic/Sony Music (5006289000); Format: CD	30
Between Birth and Death	Released: 17 November 2003; Label: Sony Music (5139052000); Format: CD	48

=== Extended plays ===
List of EPs, with release date and chart position shown
Title	EP details	Peak chart positions
Title	EP details	AUS
Society Anxiety	Released: 29 November 1999; Label: Epic (668400 2); Format: CD	40

=== Singles ===
List of singles, with year released and selected chart positions
Title	Year	Peak chart positions	Album
Title	Year	AUS	Album
"Make You Feel"	2000	33	Big Picture Lies
"Sunken Eyes"	2000	76	Big Picture Lies
"Everything Everyway"	2003	46	Between Birth and Death
"The Gallows Wait"	2023	-	TBD
"God Complex"	2024	-	TBD
"Dead Shadows"	2026	-	TBD
