= Between Birth and Death =

Studio album by Sunk Loto
- Released: November 2003
- Genre: Nu metal
- Length: 41:40
- Label: Sony
- Producer: Paul McKercher

Sunk Loto chronology
Big Picture Lies (2000)	Between Birth and Death (2003)

Between Birth and Death is the second studio album by Australian nu metal band Sunk Loto. Released in November 2003, it peaked at No. 48 on the ARIA Albums Chart.

At the ARIA Music Awards of 2004 it was nominated for Engineer of the Year for Paul McKercher's work. McKellar was also its producer.

In 2023, the album was reissued on vinyl by Melbourne record store Rare Records.

== Track listing ==
1. "5 Years of Silence" – 3:46
2. "Fall Apart" – 3:29
3. "Empty and Alone" – 3:03
4. "Help" – 4:01
5. "Starved" – 4:13
6. "Everything Everyway" – 3:35
7. "Burning Bridges" – 2:51
8. "INSIDE" – 2:40
9. "Past Tense Existence" – 2:40
10. "Public Imagery" – 2:28
11. "Erased" – 3:30
12. "Soul Worn Thin" – 5:25

== Charts ==
Chart (2003)	Peak position
Australian Albums (ARIA)	48
