= Lisa Miller (singer-songwriter) =

- Birth name: Lisa Anne Miller
- Origin: Melbourne, Victoria, Australia
- Genres: Rock; country pop; country rock; pop
- Occupation: Musician
- Instrument: Voice
- Years active: 1985–present
- Labels: In-Law/MDS; W. Minc/Shock; Inertia; Raoul
- Website: lisamiller.com.au

Lisa Anne Miller is an Australian country pop singer-songwriter and guitarist. She has issued seven albums, Quiet Girl with a Credit Card (1996), As Far as a Life Goes (1999), Car Tape (2002), Version Originale (2003), Morning in the Bowl of Night (2007), Car Tape 2 (2010) and Meet the Misses (2012). She has a clear, bitter-sweet voice and provides poignant semi-biographical lyrics. At the ARIA Music Awards she has been nominated nine times.

== Biography ==
Lisa Miller is the daughter of social realist painter, Peter Miller, and grew up in the Melbourne suburb of Chadstone with her elder brother Lewis Miller (born 1959), who is also a painter, and a younger brother Paul Miller. Lewis won the 1998 Archibald Prize. Miller started writing songs at fourteen and has memories of being in a folk music duo with a friend, Tracey, "I played flute, she played guitar and sang, and we wore matching paisley dresses that went to the floor, and played at coffee houses where people drank hot chocolates with marshmallows." Tracey later married Miller's brother Paul to become Tracey Miller, and, as from 2005, was also a country music singer-songwriter.

While working as a secondary school teacher, Miller's first rock group were the Hepeleptics, in 1986. She became vocalist and rhythm guitarist for the Whole Shebang in the following year. Miller wrote their track, "Another Sunday Morning", which appeared on a various artists' compilation album, The Preston Story, Vol. 1, in 1995 via Canetoad Records. She also sang in the Everlovin' O'Sheas, with Andy Baylor, Rick O'Shea and Warren Rough in 1988. In 1989 she travelled to the United States to hear music in Memphis, Nashville, Austin, New Orleans and San Francisco.

Miller returned to Melbourne in 1990 and re-joined Baylor in the Prestones, alongside Steve Mander, Victor O'Neill, Graeme Thomas and Gary Young. She formed her own roots rock band, the Trailblazers (1990–91), on lead vocals with Mark Ferrie (ex-Models, Sacred Cowboys) on bass guitar, Nick Grant on guitar, Martin Lubran on pedal steel guitar and Tony Thornton on drums. Miller and Ferrie renamed the group as Truckasaurus in 1993 with additional members, Ed Bates on guitar and Graham Lee on pedal steel guitar. They favoured original material by Miller or Ferrie and issued a self-titled album in 1993 before Miller left to be replaced by Kaarin Fairfax on lead vocals in 1994.

In 1994 Miller went solo and released two extended plays on the In-Law label: Do That for You (May 1995) and All Worked Out (November). The first EP had four tracks with co-production by Miller with Steve Hoy and Gordon Blake, and recorded at the Gershwin Room, Esplanade Hotel, Melbourne. The second EP had five tracks and was co-produced with Shane O'Mara and recorded at O'Mara's home studio, Yikesville, "[with] an ADAT recorder and a couple of cheap delay units in the spare bedroom, rather than the sophisticated backyard operation it is today. Lisa is adamant that she came up with the name 'Yikesville' during this session, but Shane doesn't believe her". O'Mara mixed it, "one night when the ARIA awards were on (the year Silverchair and Tim Rogers did 'New Race'). Lisa and Rebecca spent the evening glued to the telly, while Shane and Ben [Lempriere] got progressively drunker over the 8-track Mackie desk."

Her debut album, Quiet Girl with a Credit Card, followed in June 1996 on the W.Minc label and distributed by Shock Records. It had been recorded in April 1995 with former bandmate, Graham Lee, producing at Fortissimo Studios, South Melbourne. Dave Dawson of Impress Magazine observed that Miller's US trip, "with country radio as a sporadic soundtrack, was the fertile fuel which prompted her to quit teaching when she arrived home, manage stores selling Americana gear and sing for her supper in Suburban bars." He felt that, "The long gestation period for this album has been a blessing – songs that began life in one guise have, by osmosis, developed new cloaks... country and western... is a far cry from Ms Miller's eclectic mix of country, funk, folk and pop." It was also issued in the United Kingdom on Demon Records, to date her only release outside of Australia.

Three years later her second album, As Far as a Life Goes (June 1999), appeared on the W.Minc label, albeit via the now-defunct, Festival Mushroom Records. It was produced by Barry Palmer (Deadstar, Mark Seymour, Christopher Marshall) at Sing Sing Studios, Richmond in September 1998. At the ARIA Music Awards of 1999 she was nominated for Best Female Artist for As Far as a Life Goes.

After sorting out troubles with her record companies, Miller released an album, Car Tape, of cover versions in May 2002 for the fledgling Melbourne label, Raoul Records, which is run by her husband, Ben Lempriere. It found her in a country-soul vein and was a critical success. Australian musicologist, Ian McFarlane, felt it was, "a delightful and idiosyncratic collection of songs." Her material was mostly by US singer-songwriters including, Arthur Alexander, Karen Dalton, Charlie Rich and Townes Van Zandt. She also provided her rendition of Tim Rogers' "Word for Sadness", which appeared on You Am I's fifth album, Deliverance in September. According to Miller it was named for, "grimy cassettes which get stuck, and you have to stick a pen into the reel to wind them up. And they're funny songs that someone puts on a tape because they're special to them, and they're often a bit odd."

Car Tape was produced, recorded and mixed by O'Mara at his studio, at various times during 2000 and 2001. It peaked at No. 8 on the ARIA Hitseekers Albums and No. 24 on the ARIA Alternative Albums chart. O'Mara later recalled, "It was sort of when everything clicked and I found my feet or something. It was through that album that I met Tim Rogers who told me he loved what I did on Lisa's album." She received three more ARIA Music Award nominations in 2002: for Best Female Artist, Best Independent Release and Best Adult Contemporary Album for Car Tape. It was one of the best-selling Australian independent releases of 2002.

In 2003 she released her fourth album, Version Originale, a CD of original compositions, that was also warmly received by critics. With her band, featuring guitarist and producer, O'Mara, Miller has been a sporadic live performer in and around Melbourne, with forays up the east coast of Australia, including the Byron Bay Blues Festival. She has played with Billy Bragg and toured Australia with Neil Young and Nick Cave. She has also appeared on recordings by Australian musicians David McComb, Tim Rogers, Tex Perkins, Andy Baylor, Barb Waters, Doug Mansfield, Amanda Brown (of The Go-Betweens) and David Chesworth. At one time she was managed by the late Mick Geyer (close associate of Nick Cave), but is now self-managed.

In 2004 Miller released the EP, Pushover, which features five songs recorded live on the 2003 Neil Young tour. She was again nominated in the Best Female Artist category at the 2004 ARIA Awards, at which – once again – she was beaten by Kasey Chambers. Miller collaborated with composer Amanda Brown on a number of songs for the feature film, Look Both Ways, but only one track, "Eleven", made the final selection.

In 2005 she recorded a version of the Split Enz song "I Hope I Never" for She Will Have Her Way, a tribute album of female Australian and New Zealand artists performing the works of Tim and Neil Finn. This album was nominated for a 2006 ARIA award under "Best Adult Contemporary Artist".

Her fifth album, Morning in the Bowl of Night, was released in March 2007, many of the songs focussing around the death of Miller's mother. In early 2008, Morning in the Bowl of Night, was shortlisted for the Australian Music Prize.

== Personnel ==
In 2006 Miller's band consisted of:

- Lisa Miller – vocals, rhythm guitar
- Shane O'Mara – lead guitar
- Peter Jones – drums
- Bill McDonald – bass guitar

== Discography ==
=== Albums ===
List of albums, with selected details
Title	Details
Quiet Girl with a Credit Card	Released: June 1996; Label: W. Minc Productions (W.MINCD004); Format: CD
As Far as a Life Goes	Released: June 1999; Label: W. Minc Productions (W.MINCD009); Format: CD
Car Tape	Released: May 2002; Label: Raoul Records (WIFECD001); Format: CD
Version Originale	Released: October 2003; Label: Raoul Records (WIFECD003); Format: CD
Morning in the Bowl of Night	Released: May 2007; Label: Raoul Records (WIFECD007); Format: CD, digital
Car Tape 2	Released: May 2010; Label: Raoul Records (WIFECD008); Format: CD, digital
Meet the Misses	Released: 2012; Label: Raoul Records (WIFECD009); Format: CD, digital

=== Extended Plays ===
List of EPs, with selected details
Title	Details
Do That for You	Released: 1995; Label: In-Law Records (Mother02); Format: CD
All Worked Out	Released: 1995; Label: In-Law Records (Mother03); Format: CD
Pushover	Released: 2004; Label: Raoul Records (WIFECD004); Format: CD
The Dusty Millers (with Loretta Miller and Tracey Miller)	Released: March 2017; Label: The Dusty Millers; Format: 300 copies CD

=== Other appearances ===
The Whole Shebang

- The Preston Story, Vol. 1 – "Funnel of Love", "Another Sunday Morning" – recorded 1987, released 1995 Canetoad Records (CD-006)

solo

- Recovery: Hits from the Back Door – "Hang Your Head" (live) (1997)
- RRRewind in the Chapel – "Are You the One that I've Been Waiting For" (live), "It's a Long Way to the Top" (live) – 1998
- Highlights from the ABC TV Series Studio 22 – "Trade" (live) (2002)
- You Can't Hide Your Love Forever – A Tribute to Gene Clark – "Why Not Your Baby" (live) – 2002
- The DIG Australian Blues Project – "Red Cross Store Blues" (live) – 2005
- She Will Have Her Way – "I Hope I Never" – 2005

duet with Tex Perkins

- To Hal and Bacharach – "The Look of Love" – 1998

=== Film soundtracks ===
- Mullet (by Various Artists) (2000)
- Dirty Deeds (by Various Artists) (2002)
- Look Both Ways (Various Artists) – "Eleven" (2005)

== Awards and nominations ==
=== ARIA Music Awards ===
The ARIA Music Awards is an annual awards ceremony that recognises excellence, innovation, and achievement across all genres of Australian music. They commenced in 1987.

Year	Nominee / work	Award	Result
1999	As Far as a Life Goes	Best Female Artist	Nominated
2002	Car Tape	Best Female Artist	Nominated
2002	Car Tape	Best Independent Release	Nominated
2002	Car Tape	Best Adult Contemporary Album	Nominated
2004	Version Originale	Best Female Artist	Nominated
2004	Version Originale	Best Adult Contemporary Album	Nominated
2007	Morning in the Bowl of Night	Best Adult Contemporary Album	Nominated
2010	Car Tape 2	Best Female Artist	Nominated
2010	Lisa Miller and Shane O'Mara for Car Tape 2	Producer of the Year	Nominated
