= Bang This =

Single by J-Wess featuring Kulaia & Digga

from the album J-Wess Presents Tha LP
- Released: July 23, 2003
- Recorded: 2003
- Genre: Pop, R&B
- Length: 3:34
- Label: Mushroom
- Songwriters: J. Essex, A. Gardner
- Producer: J-Wess

J-Wess singles chronology
"Bang This" (2003)	"What Chu Want" (2004)

"Bang This" is a pop-R&B song released by American-Australian urban artist J-Wess as the lead single from his debut album, J-Wess Presents Tha LP (2004). "Bang This" was written by J. Essex and A. Gardner and produced by J-Wess himself. "Bang this" features vocals from Kulaia and rapper Digga. The single was released in mid-2003 and began to garner airplays shortly after its release; the music video for "Bang this" also received plays on Australian video programs such as RAGE and Video Hits Australia. "Bang this" eventually debuted at number twenty-two on the Australian ARIA Singles Chart, and later reached a peak position of eighteen, becoming J-Wess' first top twenty single. Its success in Australia also led to it charting on the New Zealand RIANZ Singles Chart, where it reached number thirty-nine.

== Official versions ==
- "Bang This (Album Version) – 3:34

== Charts ==
Chart performance for "Bang This"
Chart (2003)	Peak position
Australia (ARIA)	16
Australian Urban (ARIA)	7
New Zealand (Recorded Music NZ)	39
