= The Dissociatives =

Australian band

- Origin: Sydney, New South Wales, Australia
- Genres: Alternative rock, electronic
- Years active: 2000–2005
- Members: Daniel Johns; Paul Mac; Touring members: Julian Hamilton; James Haselwood; Kim Moyes
- Website: thedissociatives.com

The Dissociatives were an Australian alternative rock band consisting of Daniel Johns of Silverchair and dance producer and DJ Paul Mac (of Itch-E and Scratch-E), which formed in mid-2003. They were supported by touring members, Julian Hamilton and Kim Moyes (both from the Presets), and James Haselwood. Their first single, "Somewhere Down the Barrel" (March 2004), peaked at No. 25 on the ARIA Singles Chart. The duo's debut album, The Dissociatives (4 April 2004), reached No. 12 on the ARIA Albums Chart. At the ARIA Music Awards of 2004 they won two trophies: Best Cover Art for James Hackett's work on The Dissociatives and Best Video for Hackett's direction of "Somewhere Down the Barrel".

== 1997-2002: I Can't Believe It's not Rock ==
The Dissociatives' founders, Daniel Johns of Silverchair and Paul Mac of Itch-E and Scratch-E met in 1997 when Mac remixed Silverchair's track, "Freak". Later that year Mac appeared on-stage with Johns' group in Sydney as a guest DJ. In the following year Mac contributed keyboards to Silverchair's album Neon Ballroom. In 2000, during their respective bands' hiatus, Johns and Mac recorded a track at Mac's home studio in Blue Mountains. Later Mac travelled to Merewether to help Johns install an eight-track home studio, where they recorded more tracks.

I Can't Believe It's not Rock is the self-titled debut extended play of Johns and Mac's experimental project of the same name. It was released on 1 December 2000 and contains five tracks written and recorded by Johns and Mac for their own amusement. After the tracks were completed, the duo decided to issue the work. Mac later explained, "When we were making this music we never thought anybody else would ever hear it. It was just stuff we were doing for ourselves. Once it was done though we liked how it had turned out so we started talking about releasing it even though, as the name suggests, it probably isn't what people expect from either of us."

Both Johns and Mac were signed to Eleven: A Music Company, which issued, I Can't Believe It's not Rock online. It is the first release by the new label and was co-produced by Johns and Mac. The five tracks were streamed for free from their website, icantbelieveitsnotrock.com and were available for paid download. A limited number of CDs were available through Silverchair's fan club, the LAS. The group appeared in ABC-TV's drama series, Love Is a Four Letter Word (2001), as a pub band in "Episode 13" and performed material from the EP.

=== I Can't Believe Its not Rock ===
All songs written by Daniel Johns and Paul Mac.

1. "Rain" – 4:47
2. "Take Her Out" – 3:02
3. "3" – 2:39
4. "Staging a Traffic Jam" – 6:32
5. "Home" – 6:48

== 2003–2005: The making of The Dissociatives album and hiatus ==
In mid-2003, Johns and Mac formed the Dissociatives as an alternative rock duo, and they issued a self-titled album on 5 April 2004. They recorded basic tracks in London, finishing them off in Sydney and Newcastle. The pair produced all the instrumental tracks and vocals themselves with Johns writing lyrics and recording them in Newcastle. Johns described its music and lyrics in the Australian edition of Rolling Stone (April 2004): "The music is, for me, a combination of excitement, happiness, rambunctiousness and viciousness, done to whimsy." "I'd add with a hint of melancholy, but it's more outweighed by joy," added Mac.

This duo's first single "Somewhere Down the Barrel" appeared ahead of the album in March 2004 and peaked at No. 25 on the ARIA Singles Chart. The album reached No. 12 on the related ARIA Albums Chart. "Young Man, Old Man (You Ain't Better Than the Rest)", its second single followed in May, which reached the ARIA top 50. A video album, Sydney Circa 2004/08, appeared in October.

At the ARIA Music Awards of 2004 they won two trophies; Best Cover Art for James Hackett's work on The Dissociatives and Best Video for Hackett's direction of "Somewhere Down the Barrel". The group were also nominated for Album of the Year, Best Group, Best Pop Release and for Johns and Mac's work as Producer of the Year. In 2005 their sole nomination was for Best Music DVD for Sydney Circa 2004/08.

The pair, in an interview on Rove Live in 2004, described the musical journey of the Dissociatives, as "definitely not a side project" and that they plan to release more music in the future. However, the band have been on hiatus since 2005 due to focussing on their main projects (Silverchair, the Presets, Johns' solo work), and they have not provided plans for future recordings or performances.

== Discography and appearances ==
=== Studio albums ===
List of studio albums, with selected chart positions and certifications
Title	Album details	Peak chart positions	Certifications
Title	Album details	AUS	Certifications
The Dissociatives	Released: 5 April 2004; Label: Eleven: A Music Company (ELEVENCD23); Formats: CD	12	ARIA: Gold

=== Video albums ===
List of Video albums
Title	Album details
Sydney Circa 2004/08	Released: 18 October 2004; Label: Eleven: A Music Company/EMI ELEVENDVD30; Format: DVD

=== Extended plays ===
List of Extended plays
Title	Album details
I Can't Believe It's not Rock (As I Can't Believe It's not Rock)	Released: December 2000; Label: Eleven: A Music Company; Format: CD

=== Singles ===
List of singles, with selected chart positions and certifications
Title	Year	Peak chart positions	Album
Title	Year	AUS	Album
"Somewhere Down the Barrel"	2004	25	The Dissociatives
"Young Man, Old Man (You Ain't Better Than the Rest)"	2004	46	The Dissociatives

=== Other appearances ===
- Spicks and Specks (2005); performed and produced the title music for this Australian TV show, which is a cover version of the Bee Gees' single of the same name.

== Awards and nominations ==
=== ARIA Awards ===
The Australian Recording Industry Association Music Awards (commonly known as ARIA Music Awards or ARIA Awards) is an annual series of awards nights celebrating the Australian music industry, presented by the Australian Recording Industry Association (ARIA).

Year	Nominee / work	Award	Result	Ref.
2004	The Dissociatives	Album of the Year	Nominated	
2004	The Dissociatives	Best Group	Nominated	
2004	The Dissociatives	Best Pop Release	Nominated	
2004	The Dissociatives	Best Cover Art	Won	
2004	The Dissociatives	Producer of the Year	Nominated	
2004	James Hackett for "Somewhere Down the Barrel"	Best Video	Won	
2005	Sydney Circa 2004/08	Best Music DVD	Nominated	

=== APRA Awards ===
The APRA Music Awards are several award ceremonies run in Australia by Australasian Performing Right Association to recognise songwriting skills, sales and airplay performance by its members annually. Songwriter of the Year is voted by APRA's Board of Writer and Publisher Directors rewarding the songwriter who has recorded the most impressive body of work in the previous year.

Year	Nominee / work	Award	Result
2005	"Young Man Old Man (You Ain't Better Than the Rest)"	Song of the Year	Nominated
