= The Dissociatives (album) =

Studio album by The Dissociatives
- Released: 5 April 2004
- Recorded: Late 2003
- Genre: Pop
- Length: 43:42
- Label: Eleven
- Producer: Paul Mac

Singles from The Dissociatives
- 1. "Somewhere Down the Barrel" Released: March 2004; 2. "Young Man, Old Man (You Ain't Better Than the Rest)" Released: May 2004

The Dissociatives is the sole album by the Australian duo of the same name, released in April 2004 by record label Eleven. It peaked at No. 12 on the ARIA Albums Chart. Three singles were issued from the album, "Somewhere Down the Barrel" (March 2004), "Young Man, Old Man (You Ain't Better Than the Rest)" (May) and "Horror with Eyeballs". At the ARIA Music Awards of 2004 they won Best Video for "Somewhere Down the Barrel", directed by James Hackett and Best Cover Art for the album, also by Hackett.

== Background ==
Daniel Johns (of Silverchair) and Australian dance music producer, Paul Mac, met when Mac remixed Silverchair's song "Freak" off the Freak Show album. The two worked on an experimental extended play, I Can't Believe It's Not Rock, released in 2000.

== Recording and production ==
In mid-2003 Johns and Mac collaborated to record an album, The Dissociatives, starting with basic tracks in London and finishing off in Sydney and Newcastle. The pair provided all the instrumental tracks and vocals themselves with Johns writing the lyrics and recording them in Newcastle.

The duo described the music and lyrics in the April 2004 Australian edition of Rolling Stone, "The music is, for me, a combination of excitement, happiness, rambunctiousness and vicaciousness, done to whimsy," Johns said. "I'd add with a hint of melancholy, but it's more outweighed by joy," added Mac. The magazine's writer described the sound of the debut single, "Somewhere Down the Barrel", as a "happy sort of Radiohead."

== Release and reception ==
The Dissociatives was released on 4 April 2004, by record label, Eleven. It was fitted with the Copy Control protection system in some regions. "Somewhere Down the Barrel", their first single, entered the ARIA Singles Chart on debut at No. 25 on 15 March 2004. It was one of the five most played tracks on Australian radio in early March of that year. Given that Silverchair sold more albums in Australia in the 1990s than any other Australian artist, the debut album by the Dissociatives was expected to be one of the best selling ones when it was released on 5 April in that country. It debuted and peaked at No. 12 on the ARIA Albums Chart.

== Reception ==
Professional ratings
Review scores
Source	Rating
AllMusic	3.5/5 stars
Drowned in Sound	9/10
musicOMH	favourable
Pitchfork	2.5/10
PopMatters	7/10 stars

The Dissociatives has received a generally positive critical reception. A negative review came from Pitchfork, which wrote, "Leftfield techno vet Paul Mac seems stale working away from a club-oriented context, but it's Johns who seems out of his depth. Maybe he can write a three-chord rock song, but here he under-sings, over-emotes, and writes melodies that spiral off in insane directions before ending up nowhere".

== Track listing ==
All music written by Daniel Johns and Paul Mac; all lyrics written by Johns.

1. "We're Much Preferred Customers" – 5:46
2. "Somewhere Down the Barrel" – 4:39
3. "Horror with Eyeballs" – 4:45
4. "Lifting the Veil from the Braille" – 4:18
5. "Forever and a Day" – 4:49
6. "Thinking in Reverse" – 3:41
7. "Paris Circa 2007slash08" – 3:52
8. "Young Man, Old Man (You Ain't Better Than the Rest)" – 4:31
9. "Aaängry Megaphone Man" – 4:52
10. "Sleep Well Tonight" – 2:29
11. "Paris Circa 2007slash08" (Hermitude Remix) (Japan bonus track)

== Release history ==
The album was released in various countries.

Country	Date	Label	Format	Catalog
Australia	5 April 2004	Eleven	CD	ELEVENCD23
United States	29 March 2005	Astralwerks	CD	577944
United Kingdom	2 May 2005	Virgin Records	CD	CDVIR217
Japan	25 May 2005	Toshiba-EMI	CD	VJCP-68751
