= Camacho (album) =

Studio album by Pete Murray
- Released: 2 June 2017
- Genre: Folk rock
- Label: Sony BMG Australia

Pete Murray chronology
Blue Sky Blue "The Byron Sessions" (2013)	Camacho (2017)

Singles from Camacho
- 1. "Take Me Down" Released: April 2017; 2. "Connected" Released: September 2017; 3. "Heartbeats" Released: 21 March 2018

Camacho is the sixth studio album by Australian rock musician Pete Murray. The album was released in June 2017 peaked at number 3 on the ARIA Charts. The album was supported with a 33-date national tour across Australia from July to September 2017.

Upon release, Murray said "With [Camacho] I feel like I've found a new sound – found my sound, because it's really getting away from what I've done before."

At the ARIA Music Awards of 2017, the album was nominated for Best Adult Contemporary Album.

== Critical reception ==
Professional ratings
Review scores
Source	Rating
The Newcastle Herald	3/5

Josh Leeson from The Newcastle Herald gave the album 3 out of 5, stating: "While there are some cosmetic changes with loops and beats, Murray has stuck to his inoffensive brand of folk-rock. The title-track's melody is so closely inspired by the Animals' classic 'House of the Rising Sun' it could be considered a tribute, while "Take Me Down" has an infectious gospel-style chorus and ranks among his best work. Camacho isn't going to propel Murray back to his halcyon days of the mid-2000s, but rusted on fans will enjoy the familiar embrace."

== Track listing ==
No.	Title	Length
1.	"Only One"	3:05
2.	"Sold"	3:28
3.	"Heartbeats"	4:01
4.	"Give Me Your Love"	3:52
5.	"Take Me Down"	3:46
6.	"Camacho"	2:57
7.	"Long Ride"	4:38
8.	"Connected"	3:08
9.	"Thought I Was"	4:43
10.	"Home"	3:24

== Charts ==
=== Weekly charts ===
Chart (2017)	Peak position
Australian Albums (ARIA)	3

=== Year-end charts ===
Chart (2017)	Position
Australia Albums Chart	44
