= Car Tape =

Studio album by Lisa Miller
- Released: 2002
- Genre: Rock
- Label: Raoul
- Producer: Shane O'Mara

Lisa Miller chronology
As Far as a Life Goes (1999)	Car Tape (2002)	Version Originale (2003)

Car Tape is the third album by Melbourne singer-songwriter Lisa Miller. It is an album of covers and was released in Australia in 2002 on Raoul Records. The album peaked at number 8 on the Australian heatSeekers and at number 24 on the Australian alternative chart

Miller's most highly acclaimed album, it was nominated for the following 2002 ARIA Awards:

- Best Female Artist (won by Kasey Chambers)
- Best Independent Release (won by 1200 Techniques)
- Best Adult Contemporary Album (won by Paul Kelly)

== Track listing ==
1. "The Boy That Radiates That Charm" (Arthur Alexander)
2. "Why Not Your Baby?" (Gene Clark)
3. "Words For Sadness" (Tim Rogers)
4. "Better Days" (Bill Withers)
5. "Have A Little Mercy" (Jean Wells)
6. "Evil" (Steve Miller)
7. "Something's On Your Mind" (Cover of the Karen Dalton version of the Dino Valenti song)
8. "Nothing Takes The Place Of You" (Toussaint McCall)
9. "Give Back The Key To My Heart" (Doug Sahm)
10. "Nobody Knows Me Like My Baby" (Lyle Lovett)
11. "Say You Don't Mind" (Denny Laine / Colin Blunstone)
12. "No Place To Fall" (Townes Van Zandt)
13. "We Love Each Other" (Charlie Rich)
