= Somewhere Down the Barrel =

2004 single by The Dissociatives

Single by The Dissociatives

from the album The Dissociatives
- Released: 2004
- Length: 4:39
- Composer(s): Daniel Johns, Paul Mac
- Lyricist(s): Daniel Johns
- Producer(s): Paul Mac

The Dissociatives singles chronology
"Somewhere Down the Barrel" (2004)	"Horror With Eyeballs" (2004)

"Somewhere Down the Barrel" is the debut single by Australian pop rock band The Dissociatives, from their album of the same name, released in 2004. It peaked at #25 on the Australian ARIA Charts.

The James Hackett directed music video won the ARIA Award for Best Video at the ARIA Music Awards of 2004.

== Charts ==
Chart (2004)	Peak position
Australia (ARIA)	25
