= You Pick Me Up =

2008 single by Pete Murray

Single by Pete Murray

from the album Summer at Eureka
- Released: April 2008
- Length: 4:33
- Label: Columbia; Sony BMG
- Songwriter(s): Pete Murray
- Producer(s): Pete Murray

Pete Murray singles chronology
"Opportunity" (2006)	"You Pick Me Up" (2008)	"Saving Grace" (2008)

Music video
- "You Pick Me Up" on YouTube

"You Pick Me Up" is a song by Australian singer-songwriter Pete Murray. It was released in April 2008 as the lead single from Murray's fourth studio album, Summer at Eureka.

== Track listing ==
CD single (88697296282)

1. "You Pick Me Up" - 4:33
2. "Class B" - 3:56
3. "You Pick Me Up" (The Late Pick Up Version) - 4:07

== Charts ==
Chart (2008)	Peak position
Australia (ARIA)	36
Netherlands (Single Top 100)	83
