= Version Originale =

Studio album by Lisa Miller
- Released: 2003
- Genre: Rock
- Label: Raoul
- Producer: Shane O'Mara

Lisa Miller chronology
Car Tape	Version Originale	Morning in the Bowl of Night

Version Originale is the fourth album by Melbourne singer-songwriter Lisa Miller. It is an album of original material which followed up her previous album, Car Tape, a collection of cover versions. Thus, the name of the album. The album peaked at number 16 on the Australian heatseakers.

It was released in Australia in 2003, and earned nominations in the 2004 ARIA Awards for "Best Female Artist" and "Best Adult Contemporary Album".

== Track listing ==
1. "I Can't Tell" (with Tim Rogers)
2. "New Record"
3. "Pushover"
4. "Don't You Say It"
5. "Eleven"
6. "Little Stars"
7. "You Make Everybody Love You"
8. "Hold On"
9. "Pay Dearly"
10. "I Love You A Thousand Dollars"
11. "I Want To Live"
