= J Wess Presents tha LP =

J Wess Presents Tha LP

Studio album by J-Wess
- Released: 4 April 2004
- Genre: Hip hop, R&B
- Length: 43:17
- Label: Mushroom
- Producer: J-Wess

J Wess Presents Tha LP is the debut album by American-Australian urban musician J-Wess, released in April 2004. The album reached the top twenty of the Australian albums chart and three songs from the album, "Bang This", "What Chu Want" and "Luv Ya", were top-20 hits in Australia.

== Recording ==
J-Wess wrote and produced the album and recruited the performers on it. He states on his website: "I feel confident that I've done my job as a producer. My job is to find and build talent, to bring new people to the forefront. I wanted to show how deep I go as a producer across the board. I wanted to show my versatility, I didn't want to be pigeon-holed." The album was released on 4 April 2004.

== Reception ==
In the middle of 2003, J-Wess' first single, "Bang This", was released. Featuring the contributions of MC Digga and the vocal talents of Kulaia, it quickly gained airplay on Australian radio and Australian video programs. The single reached a peak of number 18 on the ARIA singles charts and the top ten of the Australian urban and dance charts.

The second single "What Chu Want" featured the talents of Lolly as well as MC Digga and Kulaia and was released in late 2003. It reached the Australian top 10 in February 2004 and went gold.

His album J Wess Presents Tha LP was released on 4 April 2004 and debuted in the Australian top 20 album charts of 12 April 2004. The third single, "Luv Ya", features MC Digga, Kulaia and Isaac Moran on guitar, and it reached number 15 in Australia.

== Track listing ==
#	Title	Time	Guests	Songwriters
1.	"Intro"	0:12	-	
2.	"What Chu Want"	3:45	Kulaia, Lolly, Digga	J. Essex, A. Naitoko, A. Gardner
3.	"I Really Like This Song (skit)"	0:12	-	-
4.	"Give Me a Chance"	4:10	Lolly, Digga	J. Essex, A. Gardner
5.	"Request Line (skit)"	0:10	-	
6.	"Reelin'"	4:25	Stan Bravo, Kulaia	J. Essex, A. Gardner
7.	"What Tha...? (skit)"	0:16	-	-
8.	"Mistakes"	4:45	Rima, Digga	J. Essex, A. Gardner
9.	"Luv Ya"	4:21	Kulaia, Digga	J. Essex, A. Naitoko, A. Gardner
10.	"Trippin'"	4:11	Abby Joyce	J. Essex, M. Vozzo
11.	"No Modern Music (skit)"	0:22	-	-
12.	"Fantasy"	3:56	Kulaia, Lolly	J. Essex, A. Naitoko, A. Gardner
13.	"Bobby the Boxer (skit)"	0:12	-	J. Essex, A. Gardner
14.	"Bang This"	3:34	Digga, Kulaia	J. Essex, A. Gardner
15.	"Let Me In"	3:50	Kulaia, Digga	J. Essex
16.	"Roll Call Part 1"	4:56	Digga, Tek, Theory, Lipz	J. Essex, A. Gardner, P. Gaby, T. Kyriakidis, L. Seremelis

== Charts ==
Chart performance for Tha LP
Chart (2004)	Peak position
Australian Albums (ARIA)	19
