= Saving Grace (Pete Murray song) =

2008 single by Pete Murray

Single by Pete Murray

from the album Summer at Eureka
- Released: 19 July 2008
- Length: 2:57
- Label: Columbia; Sony BMG
- Songwriter(s): Pete Murray
- Producer(s): Pete Murray

Pete Murray singles chronology
"You Pick Me Up" (2008)	"Saving Grace" (2008)	"Chance to Say Goodbye" (2009)

Music video
- "Saving Grace" on YouTube

"Saving Grace" is a song by Australian singer-songwriter Pete Murray. It was released on 19 July 2008 as the second single from Murray's fourth studio album, Summer at Eureka.

== Reception ==
In July 2022, Stephen Green from The Music ranked "Saving Grace" as Murray's 9th best song, saying, "This is a classic stripped-back love song; the kind we look for on every Pete Murray album."

== Track listing ==
1. "Saving Grace" - 2:57
2. "You Pick Me Up" (acoustic) - 4:27

== Charts ==
Chart (2008)	Peak position
Australia (ARIA)	44
