= Longing (Pete Murray album) =

Studio album by Pete Murray
- Released: 10 October 2025
- Length: 39:52
- Label: Community
- Producer: Pete Murray

Pete Murray chronology
Best of Pete Murray (2023)	Longing (2025)

Singles from Longing
- 1. "Wouldn't It Be Good" Released: 4 October 2024; 2. "I Am Fire" Released: 14 March 2025; 3. "Home to Me" Released: 13 June 2025; 4. "Amy" Released: 15 August 2025; 5. "Higher" Released: 10 October 2025

Longing is the seventh studio album by Australian rock musician Pete Murray. The album is his second independent album, following The Game (2001). It was announced in August 2025, alongside its fourth single and released in October 2025. The album peaked at number 5 on the ARIA Charts.

Upon release, Murray said "“It’s made up of the best songs that I hadn't quite finished over time, I’d just kept putting them into an unfinished folder until I had enough to make it an album. And I feel it’s a really strong album because it’s ten years’ worth of work, and that's a life lived. So, for me, it's very special and I hope you guys enjoy it."

The album will be supported with a 15 date Australian coastal towns Longing Summer Tour in December 2025 and January 2026.

== Critical reception ==
The Rockpit called it "one of his most nourishing releases yet".

== Track listing ==
All tracks are written by Pete Murray, except "Home to Me" (written by Murray, Phil Barton, and Dave Thomson) and "Higher" (written by Murray and Dylan Sterling Cattanach).

Longing track listing
No.	Title	Length
1.	"Longing"	4:54
2.	"Amy"	3:33
3.	"Place Your Bets"	3:34
4.	"Home to Me"	3:08
5.	"Higher"	3:10
6.	"I Am Fire"	3:55
7.	"Long Way to Go"	4:59
8.	"Wouldn't It Be Good"	3:38
9.	"Heaven Calls"	4:07
10.	"Shakes"	3:54
Total length:		39:52

== Personnel ==
Credits adapted from the album's liner notes.

=== Musicians ===
- Pete Murray – vocals (all tracks), acoustic guitar (tracks 1–9), electric guitar (1, 7)
- Ian Peres – keyboards (1, 3, 6, 8), bass (6, 8–10)
- Matt Smith – electric guitar (1)
- Chris Sheehy – bass (1)
- Dave Sanders – drums (1)
- Luke Palmer – keyboards (2), bass (3, 5), acoustic guitar (3, 6), electric guitar (6)
- Sarah St. James – backing vocals (2, 4–6)
- Aaron Sterling – drums (3, 5, 6, 8–10), percussion (8)
- Brett Wood – electric guitar (3, 6–10)
- Garrett Kato – acoustic guitar, bass, keyboards (4)
- Ben Edgar – lap steel (4)
- Dylan Cattanach – keyboards (5, 10); electric guitar, horn synthesizer (5)
- Brad Hosking – horns (5)
- Kate Derepas – cello (6)
- Ben McCarthy – bass, keyboards (7)
- DJ Debris – beats (7)
- Dustin McLean – keyboards (9)

=== Technical and visuals ===
- Pete Murray – production
- Garrett Kato – production, engineering (4)
- Trials – production, engineering (7)
- Luke Palmer – additional production (2, 3, 6), engineering (1–6, 8–10), mixing (2–7)
- Dylan Cattanach – additional production (5, 10)
- Dustin McLean – additional production (9)
- Paul Pilseniks – engineering (1)
- Callum Howell – mixing (1, 8–10)
- Simon Francis – mastering
- Mira Murray – photography
- Jaden Mare – live photo
- Listen to the Graphics – artwork, design

== Charts ==
Chart performance for Longing
Chart (2025)	Peak position
Australian Albums (ARIA)	5
