= See the Sun (Pete Murray album) =

Studio album by Pete Murray
- Released: 25 September 2005
- Recorded: 2005
- Genre: Rock, acoustic
- Length: 43:26
- Label: Sony BMG Australia
- Producer: Eric Sarafin, Pete Murray

Pete Murray chronology
Feeler (2003)	See the Sun (2005)	Summer at Eureka (2008)

Singles from See the Sun
- 1. "Better Days" Released: September 2005; 2. "Class A (radio promotion only)" Released: December 2005; 3. "Opportunity" Released: March 2006

See the Sun is the third studio album by Australian singer-songwriter Pete Murray. It was released on 25 September 2005 and peaked at number 1 on the ARIA charts.

During the making of the See the Sun, Murray and the band regularly updated an online blog on Murray's official site so that fans could follow the process and get a feel for the album's sound. On this blog, it was stated by a member of the band that "Better Days" was the hardest song on the album to record, as it took multiple recording sessions before they produced the album version.

== Track listing ==
All tracks by Pete Murray

1. "Opportunity" – 3:37
2. "Class A" – 3:04
3. "Fly with You" – 4:20
4. "Smile" – 3:39
5. "Better Days" – 3:43
6. "George's Helper" – 3:50
7. "Lost Soul" – 2:52
8. "Remedy" – 4:28
9. "Trust" – 2:51
10. "See the Sun" – 3:25
11. "Security" – 3:39
12. "This Pill" – 4:39

== Personnel ==
- Nicky Bomba – percussion
- David Paul Jr. Collins – A&R
- Stefanie Fife – cello
- Jack Howard – trumpet
- Anthony Lycenko – electric guitar
- Jimi Maroudas – engineer
- Ben McCarthy – bass, keyboards, backing vocals, producer
- Pete Murray – acoustic guitar, electric guitar, vocals, producer
- Keely Pressly – backing vocals
- Eric Sarafin – producer, engineer, mixing
- Jeremy Holland Smith – French horn
- John Watson – management

== Charts ==
=== Weekly charts ===
Chart (2005–2006)	Peak position
Australian Albums (ARIA)	1
Dutch Albums (Album Top 100)	87
New Zealand Albums (RMNZ)	22

=== Year-end charts ===
Chart (2005)	Position
Australian Albums (ARIA)	18
Chart (2006)	Position
Australian Albums (ARIA)	18

=== Decade-end chart ===
Chart (2000–2009)	Position
Australian Albums (ARIA)	63

== Certifications ==
Region	Certification	Certified units/sales
Australia (ARIA)	5× Platinum	350,000^{^}
^{^} Shipments figures based on certification alone.
