= Always a Winner =

Song by Pete Murray

Single by Pete Murray

from the album Blue Sky Blue
- Released: 10 June 2011
- Length: 4:11
- Label: Sony
- Composer(s): Pete Murray

Pete Murray singles chronology
"Chance to Say Goodbye" (2008)	"Always a Winner" (2011)	"Free" (2011)

Music video
- "Always a Winner" on YouTube

"Always a Winner" is a song recorded by Australian singer-songwriter Pete Murray. It was released in June 2011 as the lead single from Murray's fifth studio album, Blue Sky Blue. "Always a Winner" peaked at number 38 on the ARIA Singles Chart and was certified gold.

== Reception ==
In 2019, Forte Magazine ranked "Always a Winner" as Murray's 4th best song, saying, "I'm sure we aren't the only ones who are suckers for a little horns and racing percussion subtlety in the background. 'Always A Winner' is most definitely a winner for any summer session and I'm sure it would sound just as cool stripped back"

In July 2022, Stephen Green from The Music also ranked "Always a Winner" as Murray's 4th best song, saying, "this is one of Pete's most immediate sing-a-long rock songs." Adding, "Featuring a horn section, it's a cracking tune and shows that there are far more strings to the Pete Murray bow than simply acoustic ballads."

== Track listing ==
1. "Always a Winner" - 4:11

== Charts ==
=== Weekly charts ===
Chart (2011)	Peak position
Australia (ARIA)	38

=== Year-end charts ===
Chart (2011)	Position
Australian Artist (ARIA Charts)	22

== Certifications ==
Region	Certification	Certified units/sales
Australia (ARIA)	Gold	35,000^{^}
^{^} Shipments figures based on certification alone.

== Release history ==
Country	Date	Format	Label
Australia	10 June 2011	Digital download	Sony
