= So Beautiful (Pete Murray song) =

2004 single by Pete Murray

Single by Pete Murray

from the album The Game and Feeler
- B-side: "Decade"; "Bitter"; "To a Friend"
- Released: 19 January 2004
- Length: 4:40
- Label: Columbia; Sony Australia
- Songwriter: Pete Murray
- Producers: Pete Murray; Paul McKercher

Pete Murray singles chronology
"Feeler" (2003)	"So Beautiful" (2004)	"Bail Me Out" (2004)

Music video
- "So Beautiful" on YouTube

"So Beautiful" is a song by Australian singer-songwriter Pete Murray. The song was originally included on Murray's debut album, The Game (2001), and was re-recorded for his following album, Feeler (2003). This version was released as the album's second single and first commercial single in January 2004. "So Beautiful" became Murray's first charting single, peaking at No. 9 on the ARIA Singles Chart and earning a platinum sales certification. It also charted in New Zealand, peaking at No. 13, and in the Netherlands, reaching No. 61.

"So Beautiful" was nominated for several awards in 2004 and 2005. At the ARIA Music Awards of 2004, the song was nominated for five awards; Best Male Artist, Best Pop Release, Single of the Year and Best Video, while Murray and McKercher were nominated for Producer of the Year for "So Beautiful". At the APRA Music Awards of 2005, the song won the award for Song of the Year.

== Background ==
Murray was inspired to write the song after seeing a group of "pretentious" people in a Brisbane bar. In a 2013 interview, he said: I can't stand pretentious people like that. I remember the way they strutted around and they were really loud and obnoxious and I just had to get out of there. I don't have time for that. As soon as I got home, I started writing the song. I was trying to get the point across that these guys needed to take a good look at themselves and see how they were acting." "So Beautiful" has been widely used as a break-up song, though this was not Murray's intention.

== Reception ==
In 2019, Forte Magazine ranked "So Beautiful" as Murray's best song, saying, "'So Beautiful’ was written after a night out where Pete felt overwhelmed by people being pretentious and by guys that needed to stop acting obnoxious. Regardless of what it means or why it was written, the song is still our #1."

In July 2022, Stephen Green from The Music also ranked 'So Beautiful' as Murray's best song, saying, "Played at countless weddings, soundtracking countless house parties and still fluttering the hearts of many a Pete Murray fan, 'So Beautiful' is just that. Simple lyrics, a memorable tune and a certain something that just hits a nerve."

== Track listing ==
Australian maxi-CD single

1. "So Beautiful" – 4:40
2. "Decade" – 4:25
3. "Bitter" – 4:36
4. "To a Friend" – 4:23

== Charts ==
=== Weekly charts ===
Chart (2004)	Peak position
Australia (ARIA)	9
Netherlands (Single Top 100)	62
New Zealand (Recorded Music NZ)	13

=== Year-end charts ===
Chart (2004)	Position
Australia (ARIA)	21
Australian Artists (ARIA)	5

== Certifications ==
Region	Certification	Certified units/sales
Australia (ARIA)	Platinum	70,000^{^}
New Zealand (RMNZ)	Gold	15,000^{‡}
^{^} Shipments figures based on certification alone.^{‡} Sales+streaming figures based on certification alone.

== Release history ==
Region	Date	Format(s)	Label(s)	Catalogue	Ref.
Australia	19 January 2004	Maxi-CD	Columbia; Sony Music Australia	674567-2	
