= Opportunity (Pete Murray song) =

2006 single by Pete Murray

Single by Pete Murray

from the album See the Sun
- Released: March 2006
- Length: 3:37
- Label: Columbia; Sony BMG
- Songwriter(s): Pete Murray
- Producer(s): Pete Murray; Eric Sarafin

Pete Murray singles chronology
"Better Days" (2005)	"Opportunity" (2006)	"You Pick Me Up" (2008)

Music video
- "Opportunity" on YouTube

"Opportunity" is a song by Australian singer-songwriter Pete Murray. It was released in March 2006 as the second and final single from Murray's third studio album, See the Sun (2005). "Opportunity" peaked at number 29 on the ARIA Singles Chart. At the APRA Music Awards of 2007, the song was nominated for Most Performed Australian Work.

== Reception ==
In 2019, Forte Magazine ranked "Opportunity" as Murray's 2nd best song, saying, "'Opportunity' is one of Murray's many perfect campfire songs as it really does get the crowd singing along".

In July 2022, Stephen Green from The Music ranked "Opportunity" as Murray's 5th best song, saying it "cemented his reputation as a real musician. With minimalist production and a focus on his vocal, this is still a song that's a staple to throw at any Aussie teenager learning guitar."

== Track listing ==
CD single (82876808402)

1. "Opportunity" – 3:37
2. "Empty" – 2:42
3. "Unfinished" – 4:09
4. "Sinner" – 3:18

== Charts ==
=== Weekly charts ===
Chart (2006)	Peak position
Australia (ARIA)	29
New Zealand (Recorded Music NZ)	32

=== Year-end charts ===
Chart (2006)	Position
Australian Artists (ARIA)	26

== Release history ==
Region	Date	Format	Label	Catalogue	Ref.
Australia	March 2006	CD single	Columbia; Sony BMG	82876808402	
