= J-Wess =

- Birth name: James Wesley Essex
- Born: 1975 (age 49–50); Los Angeles, California, United States
- Origin: Melbourne, Victoria, Australia
- Genres: Hip hop, R&B
- Occupation: Record producer
- Years active: 2005–present
- Labels: Rendition entertainment
- Website: www.jwess.com

James Wesley Essex, better known by his stage name J-Wess, is an American-Australian hip hop and R&B music producer. J-Wess is currently in the studio working on new music to follow up his most recent single titled 'Get Down'. He is based out of Los Angeles, California and Melbourne, Victoria. His sole album, J-Wess Presents Tha LP, reached the top twenty in Australia in 2005, and included three hit singles.

== Music career ==
In the middle of 2003, J-Wess's first single, "Bang This", was released. It garnered airplay on Australian radio and Australian video programs, peaked at No.18 on the ARIA singles charts, and reached the top ten of the Australian urban and dance charts.

The second single, "What Chu Want", was released in late 2003. It reached the Australian top 10 in February 2004, and went gold.

His album J-Wess Presents Tha LP was released on 5 April 2004 and debuted in the Australian top 20 album charts of 12 April 2004, peaking at No.19.

A third single, "Luv Ya", debuted at No.15 on 7 June, and was written about the encounters J-Wess had with an exotic waitress he met at a suburban Melbourne cafe in 2004.

A fourth single "Fantasy" was planned, with a music video filmed, but due to the "Luv Ya" and "Tha LP" not selling to their expectations, Fantasy was scrapped.

J-Wess had announced his new single 'Anything For You' from his upcoming album "The Director's Cut". The single was released on June 10.

== Discography ==
=== Album ===
List of albums, with selected chart positions
Title	Year	Peak chart positions
Title	Year	AUS
J Wess Presents tha LP	2004	19

=== Singles ===
List of singles, with selected chart positions
Title	Year	Peak chart positions
Title	Year	AUS
"Bang This" (featuring Digga and Kulaia)	2003	18
"What Chu Want" (featuring Lolly, Kulaia and MC Digga)	2003	10
"Luv Ya" (featuring Kulaia and Digga)	2004	15
"Fantasy"	2004	—
"Anything for You"	2005	—
