= Free (Pete Murray song) =

Single by Pete Murray

from the album Blue Sky Blue
- Released: 19 August 2011
- Length: 3:35
- Label: Sony
- Composer: Pete Murray

Pete Murray singles chronology
"Always a Winner" (2011)	"Free" (2011)	"Let You Go" (2012)

Music video
- "Free" on YouTube

"Free" is a song recorded by Australian singer-songwriter Pete Murray. It was released in August 2011 as the second single from Murray's fifth studio album, Blue Sky Blue. "Free" peaked at number 42 on the ARIA Singles Chart and was certified gold.

The music video was shot in Brazil and takes the viewer on a visual journey to discover a variety of different meanings behind the word 'free'.

== Track listing ==
1. "Free" - 3:35

== Charts ==
=== Weekly charts ===
Chart (2011)	Peak position
Australia (ARIA)	42

=== Year-end charts ===
Chart (2011)	Position
Australian Artist (ARIA Charts)	27

== Certifications ==
Region	Certification	Certified units/sales
Australia (ARIA)	Gold	35,000^{^}
^{^} Shipments figures based on certification alone.

== Release history ==
Country	Date	Format	Label
Australia	19 August 2011	Digital Download	Sony
