= Better Days (Pete Murray song) =

2005 single by Pete Murray

Single by Pete Murray

from the album See the Sun
- B-side: "Back On"; "Belong to Yesterday"
- Released: 5 September 2005
- Length: 3:46
- Label: Columbia
- Songwriter: Pete Murray
- Producers: Pete Murray; Eric Sarafin

Pete Murray singles chronology
"Please" (2004)	"Better Days" (2005)	"Opportunity" (2006)

Music video
- "Better Days" on YouTube

"Better Days" is a song by Australian singer-songwriter Pete Murray. It was released on 5 September 2005 as the lead single from his third studio album, See the Sun (2005). "Better Days" peaked at number 13 on the Australian ARIA Singles Chart and was certified gold. At the APRA Music Awards of 2006, the song was nominated for Song of the Year.

== Reception ==
In 2019, Forte Magazine ranked "Better Days" as Murray's 3rd-best song, saying: "Although this track may not have the horns we love, it does have some harmonious strings and a beautiful story". In July 2022, Stephen Green from The Music ranked "Better Days" as Murray's 2nd-best song. The song was ranked number 110 on the Triple J Hottest 100 of Australian Songs.

== Track listing ==
Australian CD single

1. "Better Days" – 3:46
2. "Back On" – 3:34
3. "Belong to Yesterday" – 3:26

== Charts ==
=== Weekly charts ===
Chart (2005–2006)	Peak position
Australia (ARIA)	13
New Zealand (Recorded Music NZ)	32

=== Year-end charts ===
Chart (2005)	Position
Australia (ARIA)	81

== Certifications ==
Region	Certification	Certified units/sales
Australia (ARIA)	Gold	35,000^{^}
New Zealand (RMNZ)	Gold	15,000^{‡}
^{^} Shipments figures based on certification alone.^{‡} Sales+streaming figures based on certification alone.

== Release history ==
Region	Date	Format(s)	Label(s)	Catalogue	Ref.
Australia	5 September 2005	CD single	Columbia	82876724792	
