= Feeler (Pete Murray album) =

Studio album by Pete Murray
- Released: 21 July 2003
- Recorded: 2003
- Length: 41:16
- Label: Sony Music
- Producers: Paul McKercher, Pete Murray

Pete Murray chronology
The Game (2002)	Feeler (2003)	See the Sun (2005)

Singles from Feeler
- 1. "Feeler" Released: 2003; 2. "So Beautiful" Released: 19 January 2004; 3. "Bail Me Out" Released: 21 June 2004; 4. "Please" Released: 11 October 2004

Feeler is the second studio album by Australian singer-songwriter Pete Murray. Released on 21 July 2003, the album peaked at number one on the Australian charts.

== Background ==
In 2001, Pete Murray released an independent album The Game which prompted Sony Music Australia to sign him.

In early 2003, Pete Murray and his band entered the studio with producer Paul McKercher and his band to make the Feeler album. On his website, Pete Murray outlines the type of record he was hoping to make. "The records I love by people like Nick Drake, Neil Young, Bob Dylan, they are built to last. I wanted this to be an album like that, something you can pull out in 30 years and still hear the feeling in it, rather than something that's dated by the musical fashions of the day."

== Track listing ==
1. "Feeler" – 4:21
2. "Bail Me Out" – 4:03
3. "So Beautiful" – 4:39
4. "Lines" – 3:00
5. "Freedom" – 3:16
6. "Please" – 3:23
7. "Fall Your Way" – 3:44
8. "My Time" – 4:08
9. "Tonic" – 3:00
10. "No More" – 3:08
11. "Ten Ft Tall" – 4:28

== Chart positions ==
=== Weekly charts ===
Chart (2003–2006)	Peak position
Australian Albums (ARIA)	1
Dutch Albums (Album Top 100)	53
New Zealand Albums (RMNZ)	15

=== Year-end charts ===
Chart (2003)	Position
Australian Albums (ARIA)	78
Chart (2004)	Position
Australian Albums (ARIA)	3
Chart (2005)	Position
Australian Albums (ARIA)	74

=== Decade-end chart ===
Chart (2000–2009)	Position
Australian Albums (ARIA)	17

== Certifications ==
Region	Certification	Certified units/sales
Australia (ARIA)	7× Platinum	490,000^{^}
^{^} Shipments figures based on certification alone.
