= Blue Sky Blue (album) =

Studio album by Pete Murray
- Released: 2 September 2011
- Genre: Alternative rock, acoustic
- Length: 39:30
- Label: Sony BMG Australia

Pete Murray chronology
Summer at Eureka (2008)	Blue Sky Blue (2011)	Blue Sky Blue "The Byron Sessions" (2013)

Singles from Blue Sky Blue
- 1. "Always a Winner" Released: June 2011; 2. "Free" Released: August 2011; 3. "Let You Go" Released: 9 March 2012

Blue Sky Blue is the fifth studio album by Australian rock musician Pete Murray. The album peaked at number 6 on the ARIA Charts and was certified gold.

== Reception ==
Professional ratings
Review scores
Source	Rating
AllMusic	link

Jon O'Brien from AllMusic said "Eschewing the idea that the breakup album always has to be a tortured affair, Brisbane vocalist/guitarist Pete Murray's album, Blue Sky Blue, recorded after the split with his wife of three years, is a surprisingly buoyant and harmonious effort that opts for reason rather than regret or revenge" calling the album one that "...should further Murray's reputation as one of Australia's most charming singer/songwriters."

== Track listing ==
All tracks are written by Pete Murray

No.	Title	Length
1.	"Blue Sky Blue"	4:12
2.	"Always a Winner"	4:12
3.	"Hurricane Coming"	4:25
4.	"Free"	3:35
5.	"Led"	4:37
6.	"Let You Go"	4:46
7.	"Broken"	4:53
8.	"H.O.L.L.A.N.D." (Hope Our Love Lasts and Never Dies)	4:36
9.	"Tattoo Stained"	3:29
10.	"Hold It All for Love"	4:44
11.	"Vacant"	3:42

Deluxe Edition (Bonus disc)
No.	Title	Length
1.	"Blue Sky Blue" (acoustic)	4:17
2.	"Always a Winner" (Lounge version)	4:26
3.	"Hurricane Coming" (Rodriguez version)	4:00
4.	"Led" (acoustic)	4:55
5.	"Let You Go" (acoustic)	4:59
6.	"H.O.L.L.A.N.D" (acoustic)	4:27

== Charts ==
=== Weekly charts ===
Chart (2011)	Peak position
Australian Albums (ARIA)	6

=== Year-end charts ===
Chart (2011)	Position
Australia Albums Chart	65
Australian Artist Albums Chart	12

== Certifications ==
Region	Certification	Certified units/sales
Australia (ARIA)	Gold	35,000^{^}
^{^} Shipments figures based on certification alone.
