= Pete Murray (Australian musician) =

Australian singer-songwriter (born 1969)

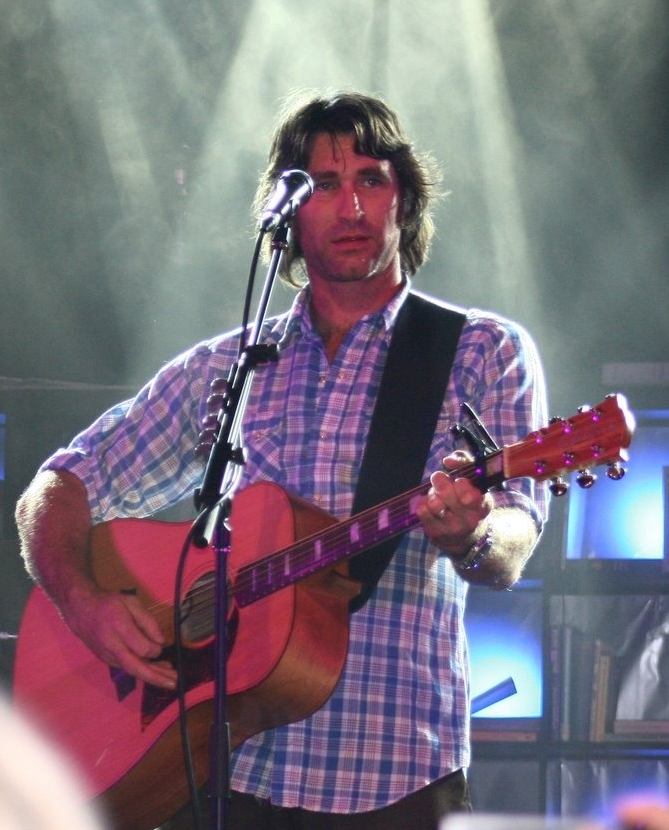
- Murray in 2008

Background information
- Born: Peter Kenneth Murray; 14 October 1969 (age 57); Chinchilla, Queensland, Australia
- Origin: Brisbane, Queensland, Australia
- Genres: Rock, folk, acoustic
- Occupations: Musician, singer-songwriter
- Instruments: Guitar, vocals
- Years active: 2001–present
- Label: Sony BMG
- Website: petemurray.com

Peter Kenneth Murray (born 14 October 1969) is an Australian musician. As of 2025, he has had three albums reach number 1 on the Australian (ARIA) charts: Feeler (2003), See the Sun (2005), and Summer at Eureka (2008), which were consecutive releases. As of 2023, Murray has received 17 ARIA nominations throughout his career, and he has sold over 1.2 million albums in Australia alone.

== Early life ==
Peter Kenneth Murray was born in Chinchilla, on 14 October 1969. His mother is Jan and he has a sister. When Murray was 16 the family moved to Brisbane. He attended St Joseph's College, Nudgee, for his final two years of secondary schooling. At the college, Murray showed talent in rugby union, athletics, and swimming. He briefly played Brisbane club rugby for GPS and Brothers. When he was 18, his father died of a heart attack, which made him realise "how precious time was".

While on the sidelines, Murray started to learn the guitar at age 22. Eventually, he worked up the courage to take his guitar to a barbecue, singing songs by Neil Young and Crowded House. However, his main interest was traveling and pursuing a career in sports medicine. Murray played small gigs around the country with flautist Col McIntyre, eventually putting a band together (including the keyboard player Ben McCarthy, who works with him to this day).

== Career ==
=== 2001–2002: The Game ===
In 2001, Murray released the EP D Day followed by the album, The Game on Auxiliary Records. Murray moved to Melbourne to pursue a musical career.

=== 2003–2004: Feeler ===
In early 2003, Murray signed a contract with Sony BMG and he entered the studio with producer Paul McKercher and his band (consisting of Ben McCarthy on bass guitar and keyboards, Christian Sargeant on drums, Paul Tyrell on guitar and Col McIntyre on reeds & flute) to make the Feeler album. Feeler was released on 21 July 2003 with the title track as the first single. Triple J radio started playing the track with the Nova FM and Triple M networks picking it up. With this support, Feeler entered the ARIA top 50 album charts in 2003. His reputation was building fast and he started selling out shows in smaller venues. "So Beautiful" was released in January 2004, reaching the top ten. This spurred sales of the album driving it to number one on the Australian album charts in late March 2004 and six times platinum status. By 2008, the album had sold half-a-million copies.

=== 2005–2007: See the Sun ===
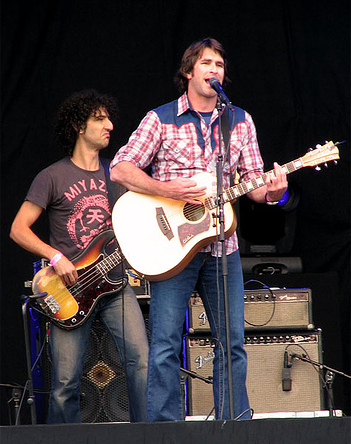
Murray in 2006

Murray's third studio album, See the Sun, was released in September 2005. The album spawned three official singles, "Better Days", "Opportunity" and "George's Helper", while a video was made for radio single "Class A". Days after its release, Murray performed at the 2005 NRL grand final. See the Sun sold 350,000 copies.

=== 2008–2010: Summer at Eureka ===
His fourth studio album, Summer at Eureka, was released on 17 May 2008. It entered the charts at number 1 in Australia, his third consecutive chart-topping album. The first single from the album was "You Pick Me Up", which reached number 36 on the Australian charts. The second single from the album, "Saving Grace", was released in July 2008.

=== 2011–2015: Blue Sky Blue ===
His fifth studio album, Blue Sky Blue, was released in Australia on 2 September 2011 and peaked at number 6 in Australia and was certified gold. In 2012, many of the songs were re-recorded with a number of the songs recorded as duets. This album was titled Blue Sky Blue "The Byron Sessions" and peaked at number 17 in Australia in 2013.

=== 2017–2018: Camacho ===
In June 2017, Murray released his seventh studio album Camacho. The album peaked at number 3 in Australia.

=== 2020–2022: The Night and Before I Go ===
On 26 June 2020, Murray released "Found My Place", his first single since Camacho. It was the lead single from his EP The Night, which was released on 5 March 2021. The EP also featured the singles "If We Never Dance Again" and "Waiting for This Love". On 17 September 2021, Pete released "Hold Me Steady", the first single from the follow-up EP, Before I Go, released on 1 April 2022.

=== 2023: Best Of ===
In February 2023, Murray announced the release of Best of Pete Murray. The album was released in May 2023 with a Greatest Hits Tour, commencing in July. Also in 2023, Murray was unmasked as "Tiny" on the fifth season of Network 10's The Masked Singer Australia. He was unmasked on the sixth episode after his third performance. In March 2025, Murray announced a 55-day Australian tour. In August 2025, Murray announced his seventh album Longing will be released in October 2025.

In November 2026, Murray confirmed the forthcoming released of Feeler (Pete's Version) as well as a 6-part documentary.

== Personal life ==
Murray married Amanda Coutts on 7 October 2006 in the New South Wales town of Eureka. In July 2009, Murray and Coutts had separated and shared custody of their two children. Coutts worked as a designer and renovated a set of stables into a home. In 2016, he married his partner of four years, Mira Eady. He resides in Byron Bay.

== Discography ==
- The Game (2001)
- Feeler (2003)
- See the Sun (2005)
- Summer at Eureka (2008)
- Blue Sky Blue (2011)
- Camacho (2017)
- Longing (2025)
- Feeler (Pete's Version) (2027)

== Awards and nominations ==
=== ARIA Music Awards ===
The ARIA Music Awards is an annual awards ceremony that recognises excellence, innovation, and achievement across all genres of Australian music. Murray has been nominated for 17 ARIA Music Awards.

Year	Nominee / work	Award	Result
2003	Feeler	Breakthrough Artist – Album	Nominated
2003	Feeler	Best Blues & Roots Album	Nominated
2003	Paul McKercher for Feeler	Producer of the Year	Nominated
2003	Paul McKercher for Feeler	Engineer of the Year	Nominated
2004	Feeler	Highest Selling Album	Nominated
2004	"So Beautiful"	Best Male Artist	Nominated
2004	"So Beautiful"	Single of the Year	Nominated
2004	"So Beautiful"	Best Pop Release	Nominated
2004	"So Beautiful"	Best Video	Nominated
2004	Passing Time	Best Music DVD	Nominated
2004	Paul McKercher & Pete Murray for "So Beautiful"	Producer of the Year	Nominated
2006	See the Sun	Highest Selling Album	Nominated
2006	See the Sun	Best Male Artist	Nominated
2008	Summer at Eureka	Best Male Artist	Nominated
2008	Anthony Lycenko for Summer at Eureka	Engineer of the Year	Nominated
2009	Chance to Say Goodbye	Best Blues & Roots Album	Nominated
2017	Camacho	Best Adult Contemporary Album	Nominated

=== APRA awards ===
The APRA Awards are several award ceremonies run in Australia by the Australasian Performing Right Association (APRA) to recognise composing and song writing skills, sales and airplay performance by its members annually. The awards have been presented annually since 1982.

Year	Nominee / work	Award	Result
2005	"So Beautiful" (Peter Murray)	Most Performed Australian Work	Won
2006	"Better Days" (Murray)	Song of the Year	Nominated
2007	"Opportunity" (Murray)	Most Performed Australian Work	Nominated
2012	"Always a Winner" (Murray, Tom Rothrock)	Song of the Year	Shortlisted

=== Country Music Awards (CMAA) ===
The Country Music Awards of Australia (CMAA) (also known as the Golden Guitar Awards) is an annual awards night held in January during the Tamworth Country Music Festival, celebrating recording excellence in the Australian country music industry. They have been held annually since 1973.

Year	Nominee / work	Award	Result	Ref.
2027	"Time to Burn" (with Casey Barnes)	Vocal Collaboration of the Year	Pending	

=== Queensland Music Awards ===
The Queensland Music Awards (previously known as Q Song Awards) are annual awards celebrating Queensland, Australia's brightest emerging artists and established legends. They commenced in 2006.

Year	Nominee / work	Award	Result (wins only)
2012	himself	The Courier-Mail People's Choice Award Most Popular Male	Won
