= Summer at Eureka =

Studio album by Pete Murray
- Released: 17 May 2008
- Genre: Alternative rock Acoustic
- Length: 42:03

Pete Murray chronology
See The Sun (2005)	Summer at Eureka (2008)	Blue Sky Blue (2011)

Singles from Summer at Eureka
- 1. "You Pick Me Up" Released: April 2008; 2. "Saving Grace" Released: July 2008; 3. "Chance to Say Goodbye" Released: 27 March 2009

Professional ratings
Review scores
Source	Rating
AllMusic	3/5 stars

Summer at Eureka is the fourth studio album by Australian rock musician Pete Murray, and became his third album to peak at number 1 on the ARIA Chart. The album also peaked at #19 in New Zealand and #17 in the Netherlands.

== Track listing ==
All tracks by Pete Murray

1. "Chance to Say Goodbye" – 4:58
2. "Saving Grace" – 2:57
3. "You Pick Me Up" – 4:32
4. "Silver Cloud" – 4:00
5. "This Game" – 3:55
6. "Sugar" – 4:30
7. "Miss Cold" – 4:04
8. "Never Let the End Begin" – 3:01
9. "Summer at Eureka" – 3:10
10. "King Tide" – 3:06
11. "Happy Ground" – 3:50
12. "Slack" – 3:24 (iTunes bonus track)

== Personnel ==
- Danielle Bentley – cello
- Anthony Lycenko – piano, producer, engineer, slide guitar, mixing
- Ben McCarthy – acoustic guitar, piano, organ, backing vocals, producer, engineer, mellotron, fender rhodes
- Darren Middleton – electric guitar, slide guitar, 12-string acoustic guitar
- Pete Murray – acoustic guitar, harmonica, percussion, electric guitar, vocals, producer
- Jonathan Zion – bass
- Andy Sylvio – percussion

== Charts ==
=== Weekly charts ===
Chart (2008)	Peak position
Australian Albums (ARIA)	1
Dutch Albums (Album Top 100)	17
New Zealand Albums (RMNZ)	19

=== Year-end charts ===
Chart (2008)	Position
Australia Albums Chart	26
Australian Artist Albums Chart	7

=== Certifications ===
Region	Certification	Certified units/sales
Australia (ARIA)	Platinum	70,000^{^}
^{^} Shipments figures based on certification alone.
