= You Am I discography =

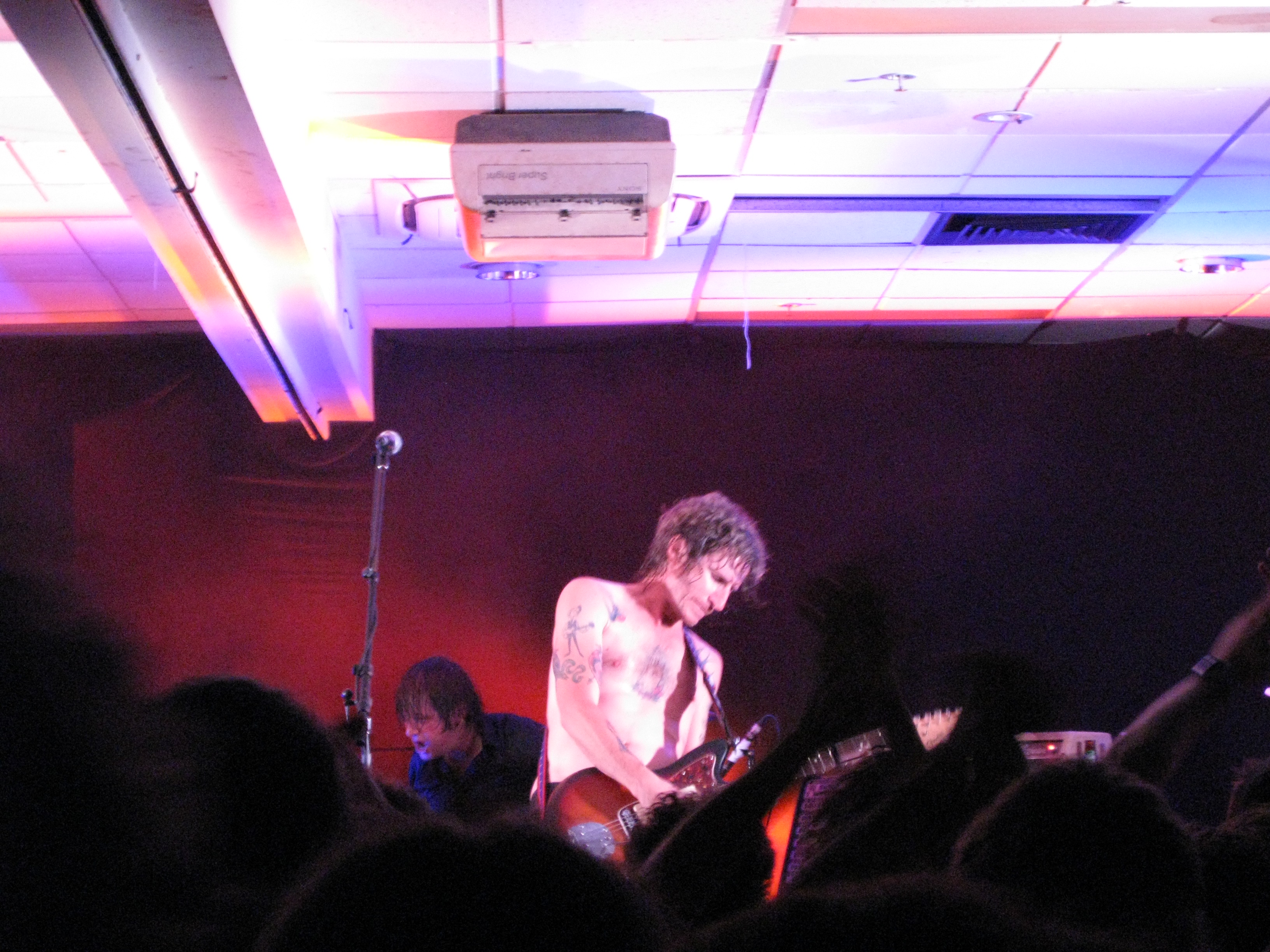
- Rogers and Hopkinson during a You Am I concert at the ANU Bar in November 2008
- Studio albums: 11
- EPs: 6
- Live albums: 2
- Compilation albums: 4
- Singles: 30
- Video albums: 2

The discography of You Am I, an Australian alternative rock band, consists of eleven studio albums, two live albums, four compilation albums, six extended plays, thirty singles and two video albums.

== Albums ==
=== Studio albums ===
List of studio albums, with selected chart positions and certifications
Title	Album details	Peak chart positions	Certifications (sales thresholds)
Title	Album details	AUS	Certifications (sales thresholds)
Sound as Ever	Released: 25 October 1993; Label: rA/rooArt (74321439652); Formats: CD, LP (reissue)	56	
Hi Fi Way	Released: 20 February 1995; Label: rA/rooArt (4509994762, 4509994044); Formats: CD, MC, LP (reissue)	1	ARIA: Gold
Hourly, Daily	Released: 10 July 1996; Label: rA/rooArt, WEA/Warner Bros.; Formats: CD, MC, LP (reissue)	1	ARIA: Platinum
#4 Record	Released: 25 April 1998; Label: rA/rooArt; Formats: CD	1	ARIA: Gold
Dress Me Slowly	Released: 30 April 2001; Label: BMG Australia; Formats: CD, LP	3	
Deliverance	Released: 30 September 2002; Label: Greville/BMG Australia; Formats: CD	12	
Convicts	Released: 13 May 2006; Label: Virgin/EMI; Formats: CD	11	
Dilettantes	Released: 12 September 2008; Label: Virgin/EMI; Formats: CD	12	
You Am I	Released: 8 October 2010; Label: Other Tongues; Formats: CD	18	
Porridge & Hotsauce	Released: 6 November 2015; Label: Inertia; Formats: CD, download	20	
The Lives of Others	Released: 14 May 2021; Label: Caroline Australia; Formats: CD, download, streaming	2	

=== Live albums ===
List of live albums, with selected chart positions
Title	Album details	Peak chart positions
Title	Album details	AUS
...Saturday Night, 'Round Ten	Released: 20 September 1999; Label: rA/rooArt Records; Formats: CD	7
Live Electrified	Released: 8 December 2014; Label: YAI Records (YAI005); Formats: 3× LP, digital download	—
Someone Else's Crowd	Released: April 2025; Label: Formats: LP; Note Live At Memorial Stadium, Seattle, August 1994	175
"—" denotes releases that did not chart.

=== Compilation albums ===
List of compilation albums, with selected chart positions
Title	Album details	Peak chart positions
Title	Album details	AUS
No After You Sir...: An Introduction to You Am I	Released: 12 May 2003; Label: Transcopic; Formats: CD	—N/a
The Cream & the Crock – The Best of You Am I	Released: 15 September 2003; Label: BMG Australia; Formats: CD, 2× CD	12
The Dollop & the Wallop – The Best of You Am I	Released: 14 November 2025; Label: Sony Music Australia; Format: 2×LP	15
Hourly, Daily – Dailies, Seconds	Released: 9 October 2026; Label: Sony; Format: LP, digital	55
"—" denotes releases that did not chart.

=== Video albums ===
List of video albums
Title	Album details
The Cream & The Crock	Released: 10 November 2003; Label: BMG Australia; Formats: DVD, 2× DVD
Who Are They, These Rock Stars?	Released: 1 December 2006; Label: Virgin; Formats: DVD

== Extended plays ==
List of extended plays
Title	EP details	Peak chart positions
Title	EP details	AUS
Snake Tide	Released: May 1991; Label: Timberyard; Formats: EP	—
Goddamn	Released: May 1992; Label: Timberyard; Formats: EP, CD	150
Can't Get Started	Released: October 1992; Label: rA/rooArt; Formats: CD	177
Coprolalia	Released: April 1993; Label: rA/rooArt; Formats: CD	117
Spilt Sauce	Released: April 2016; Label: You Am I Set; Formats: EP, CD	—

== Singles ==
List of singles, with selected chart positions, showing year released and album name
Title	Year	Peak chart positions	Album
Title	Year	AUS	Album
"Adam's Ribs"	1993	150	Sound as Ever
"Berlin Chair"	1994	73	Sound as Ever
"Jaimme's Got a Gal"	1994	93	Sound as Ever
"When You Got Dry/How Much Is Enough"	1994	118	Hi Fi Way
"Cathy's Clown"	1995	36	Hi Fi Way
"Jewels and Bullets"	1995	93	Hi Fi Way
"Purple Sneakers"	1995	128	Hi Fi Way
"Mr. Milk"	1995	50	Hourly, Daily
"Soldiers"	1996	33	Hourly, Daily
"Good Mornin'"	1996	44	Hourly, Daily
"Tuesday"	1997	29	Hourly, Daily
"Trike"	1997	55	Hourly, Daily
"What I Don't Know 'bout You"	1998	28	#4 Record
"Rumble"	1998	67	#4 Record
"Heavy Heart"	1998	49	#4 Record
"Damage"	2000	37	Dress Me Slowly
"Get Up"	2000	44	Dress Me Slowly
"Kick a Hole in the Sky"	2001	77	Dress Me Slowly
"Who Put the Devil in You"	2002	promo	Deliverance
"Deliverance"	2003	119	Deliverance
"It Ain't Funny How We Don't Talk Anymore"	2006	—	Convicts
"Friends Like You"	2006	—	Convicts
"Erasmus"	2008	—	Dilettantes
"Beau Geste"	2008	—	Dilettantes
"Givin' Up and Gettin Fat"	2009	—	Dilettantes
"Shuck"	2010	—	You Am I
"Trigger Finger"	2010	—	You Am I
"Good Advices"	2015	—	Porridge and Hotsauce
"The Waterboy"	2021	—	The Lives of Others
"Rosedale Redux"	2021	—	The Lives of Others
"—" denotes releases that did not chart.
