= The Cream & the Crock – The Best of You Am I =

Greatest hits album by You Am I
- Released: 15 September 2003
- Recorded: 1993–2003
- Studio: Various
- Genre: Rock
- Length: 1:51:20
- Label: rooArt/BMG Australia
- Producer: Various

You Am I chronology
No After You Sir...: An Introduction to You Am I (2003)	The Cream & the Crock – The Best of You Am I (2003)	Convicts (2006)

The Cream & the Crock is a best-of compilation album by Australian rock band You Am I, released in 2003. It includes singles and album tracks from Sound as Ever (1993) up to Deliverance (2002). There are two versions: a single-disc standard edition (also called The Cream), featuring singles plus one album track; and the special edition, including a second disc (The Crock) of various album and extended play tracks, singles, B-sides, demos and two new tracks – "What They Do at Night" and "Mr Kermode & the Million Matches". The single-album version peaked at No. 12 on the ARIA Albums Chart. A related DVD-version, The Cream & the Crock, was issued in November of that year.

== Track listing ==
The Cream and the Crock, double-album, (BMG 82876549312)

All tracks are written by Tim Rogers, unless otherwise indicated

The Cream RA/BMG 82876549302
No.	Title	Album	Length
1.	"Berlin Chair" (Music: Andy Kent, Rogers, Mark Tunaley)	Sound as Ever	2:37
2.	"Jaimme's Got a Gal" (Music: Kent, Rogers, Tunaley)	Sound as Ever	3:31
3.	"Cathy's Clown" (Music: Rusty Hopkinson, Kent, Rogers)	Hi Fi Way	2:27
4.	"Purple Sneakers" (Music: Hopkinson, Kent, Rogers)	Hi Fi Way	3:31
5.	"Jewels and Bullets" (Music: Hopkinson, Kent, Rogers)	Hi Fi Way	2:59
6.	"Good Mornin'"	Hourly, Daily	4:13
7.	"Soldiers"	Hourly, Daily	2:32
8.	"Mr. Milk" (Music: Hopkinson, Kent, Rogers)	Hourly, Daily	3:17
9.	"Heavy Heart"	#4 Record	3:11
10.	"Rumble"	#4 Record	2:39
11.	"Trike"	Hourly, Daily	2:59
12.	"Get Up"	Dress Me Slowly	3:14
13.	"Damage"	Dress Me Slowly	3:30
14.	"Who Put the Devil in You"	Deliverance	3:23
15.	"How Much Is Enough" (Music: Hopkinson, Kent, Rogers)	"Hi Fi Way"	3:41

All tracks are written by Tim Rogers, unless otherwise indicated

The Crock
No.	Title	Album	Length
1.	"The Applecross Wing Commander" (Music: Hopkinson, Kent, Rogers)	Hi Fi Way	3:19
2.	"Minor Byrd" (Music: Hopkinson, Kent, Rogers)	Hi Fi Way	2:32
3.	"Junk"	#4 Record	2:41
4.	"What They Do at Night"	New track	3:30
5.	"Trouble"	Dirty Deeds (2002 film)	5:13
6.	"If We Can't Get It Together"	Hourly, Daily	2:34
7.	"Beautiful Girl"	Dress Me Slowly	3:18
8.	"Wally Raffles"	Hourly, Daily	3:18
9.	"Ordinary"	Sound as Ever	2:55
10.	"Gone, Gone, Gone"	Dress Me Slowly	3:26
11.	"Deliverance"	Deliverance	4:09
12.	"Mr Kermode and the Million Matches"	New track	2:31
13.	"Cool Hand Luke" (Music: Kent, Rogers, Tunaley)	Coprolalia	3:44
14.	"The Cream & the Crock"	#4 Record	3:22
15.	"She Digs Her" (Music: Hopkinson, Kent, Rogers)	Hi Fi Way	3:25
16.	"Guys, Girls, Guitars"	#4 Record	3:00
17.	"Sound as Ever" (Music: Kent, Rogers, Tunaley)	Sound as Ever	6:35
18.	"Open All Night"	Better Than Sex (film)	4:04

== Charts ==
Chart (2003)	Peak position
Australian Albums (ARIA)	12
