= The Cream & the Crock (video) =

Video by You Am I
- Released: 10 November 2003
- Recorded: 1993–2002
- Studio: Various
- Genre: Rock
- Length: 157:00
- Label: BMG
- Producer: Richard Brobyn

You Am I chronology
The Cream & the Crock (2003)	Who Are They, These Rock Stars? (2007)

The Cream & the Crock is a music video album by the Australian rock band You Am I issued on DVD on 10 November 2003. It peaked at No. 14 on the ARIA Top 40 DVD chart. It compiles 19 of their official music videos for tracks from their first studio album, Sound as Ever (October 1993) up to their sixth, Deliverance (September 2002). It also has live performances, TV appearances, interviews, commentaries on the music videos and a specially-made documentary. It was released as a partner to the band's CD best-of compilation double album, The Cream & the Crock (September 2003).

== Track listing ==
=== Music videos ===
1. Adam's Ribs
2. Berlin Chair
3. Jaimme's Got a Gal
4. Cathy's Clown
5. Jewels and Bullets
6. Purple Sneakers
7. Ken (The Mother Nature's Son)
8. Soldiers
9. Good Mornin'
10. Tuesday
11. Trike
12. What I Don't Know 'bout You
13. Rumble
14. Heavy Heart (previously unseen band performance version)
15. Damage
16. Get Up
17. Kick a Hole in the Sky
18. Who Put the Devil in You
19. Deliverance

=== Live footage ===
1. Cathy's Clown (Live at Sydney Opera House - 1996)
2. Mr Milk (Live at Sydney Opera House - 1996)
3. Trike (Live at Wodonga Civic Centre - 1997)
4. Junk (Live at Big Day Out, Sydney - 2003)
5. Deliverance (Live at Big Day Out, Sydney - 2003)
6. The Applecross Wing Commander (Live at The Metro, Sydney - 1996)
7. How Much Is Enough (Live at The Metro, Sydney - 1996)

=== TV performances ===
1. Minor Byrd (Recovery Special, 1996)
2. Jewels and Bullets (Denton, 1995)
3. Who Put the Devil in You (The Carnival with Roy and HG, 2002)
4. Nifty Lil' Number Like You (The Fat, 2003)
5. Damage (Rove Live, 2000)
6. Baby Clothes (Studio 22, 2001)
7. Draggin' Yer Bones (The Gig - Channel V, 2002)
8. 'Round Ten (The 10:30 Slot, 1999)
9. Dirty Deeds Done Dirt Cheap with Tex Perkins (Rove Live, 2002)

=== Bonus material (Gold) ===
1. The Cream & the Crock Documentary (13:27)
2. Goddamn (music video)
3. The Last Thing You Can Depend Upon (music video)
4. Open All Night (music video)
5. 'Round Ten (music video)
6. Recovery Wodonga Civic Centre Interview (2:28)
7. Tour Art Gallery

== Easter egg material ==
1. Berlin Chair (US version)
2. #4 Record TV commercial
3. Dress Me Slowly TV commercial
4. The Cream & the Crock TV commercial
