= 'No, After You Sir...': an Introduction to You Am I =

No, After You Sir...

Compilation album by You Am I
- Released: 2003
- Label: Transcopic
- Producer: Various

You Am I chronology
Deliverance (2002)	No, After You Sir... (2003)	The Cream & the Crock - The Best of You Am I (2003)

'No, After You Sir...': an Introduction to You Am I is a compilation album by Australian rock band You Am I, released in 2003. The album was released in the United Kingdom only.

== Track listing ==
1. "Junk"
2. "Minor Byrd"
3. "Good Mornin'"
4. "The Applecross Wing Commander"
5. "Hourly Daily"
6. "Mr. Milk" (Single Version)
7. "Cathy's Clown"
8. "Handwasher"
9. "Soldiers"
10. "Wally Raffles"
11. "Fifteen"
12. "Heavy Heart"
13. "Billy"
14. "Berlin Chair" (Live)
15. "Get Up"
16. "Ain’t Gone & Open"
17. "Cool Hand Luke"
