= ...Saturday Night, 'Round Ten =

Saturday Night, 'Round Ten

Live album by You Am I
- Released: 20 September 1999
- Label: BMG

You Am I chronology
#4 Record (1998)	Saturday Night, 'Round Ten (1999)	Dress Me Slowly (2001)

...Saturday Night, 'Round Ten is a live album by the Australian rock band, You Am I, released in 1999.

The performances are taken from three sets the band played in a warehouse in Richmond, Victoria. "Round Ten" was released as a radio only single. A recording of "The Cream And The Crock" from the same gigs was released as a B-side to the Internet-only single "Who Put the Devil in You". A cover version of the MC5 song, "Ramblin' Rose", is included as an unlisted hidden track at the end of the album.

This was the first album with Davey Lane as a member of the band.

== Reception ==
Trouser Press said the album "does a respectable job of capturing the band's on-stage effervescence, but hearing it is just not the same without the sights of Rogers' sexy swagger and Townshend-quality windmills and Hopkinson's Animal-like drumming (as in the Muppet)."

== Track listing ==
1. "Arse-Kickin' Lady from the North-West"
2. "Mr. Milk"
3. "Jaimme's Got a Gal"
4. "Stray"
5. "Gasoline for Two"
6. "Fifteen"
7. "Berlin Chair"
8. "Junk"
9. "Minor Byrd"
10. "Heavy Heart"
11. "'Round Ten"
12. "Purple Sneakers"
13. "Cathy's Clown"
14. "Rumble"
15. "Trike"
16. "How Much Is Enough"
17. "Ramblin' Rose" (unlisted)

== Ignorance and Vodka ==
Initial pressings came with a bonus disc entitled Ignorance and Vodka which included five rare and/or unreleased tracks plus a fifteen-minute band biography as a CD-ROM feature, which featured clips from the recording of the main album.

1. "Useless Information"
2. "Have You Plum Gone... (And Given Up On Me)"
3. "Bring the Ole Sun Down"
4. "You Want It So Bad"
5. "The Choices That I've Made"

== Charts ==
Chart (1999)	Peak position
Australian Albums (ARIA)	7
