= The Cream & the Crock =

The Cream & the Crock may refer to:

- The Cream & the Crock – The Best of You Am I, a best-of compilation album by You Am I
- The Cream & the Crock (video), a music video album by You Am I
