= ARIA Award for Best Music DVD =

Former Australian music award

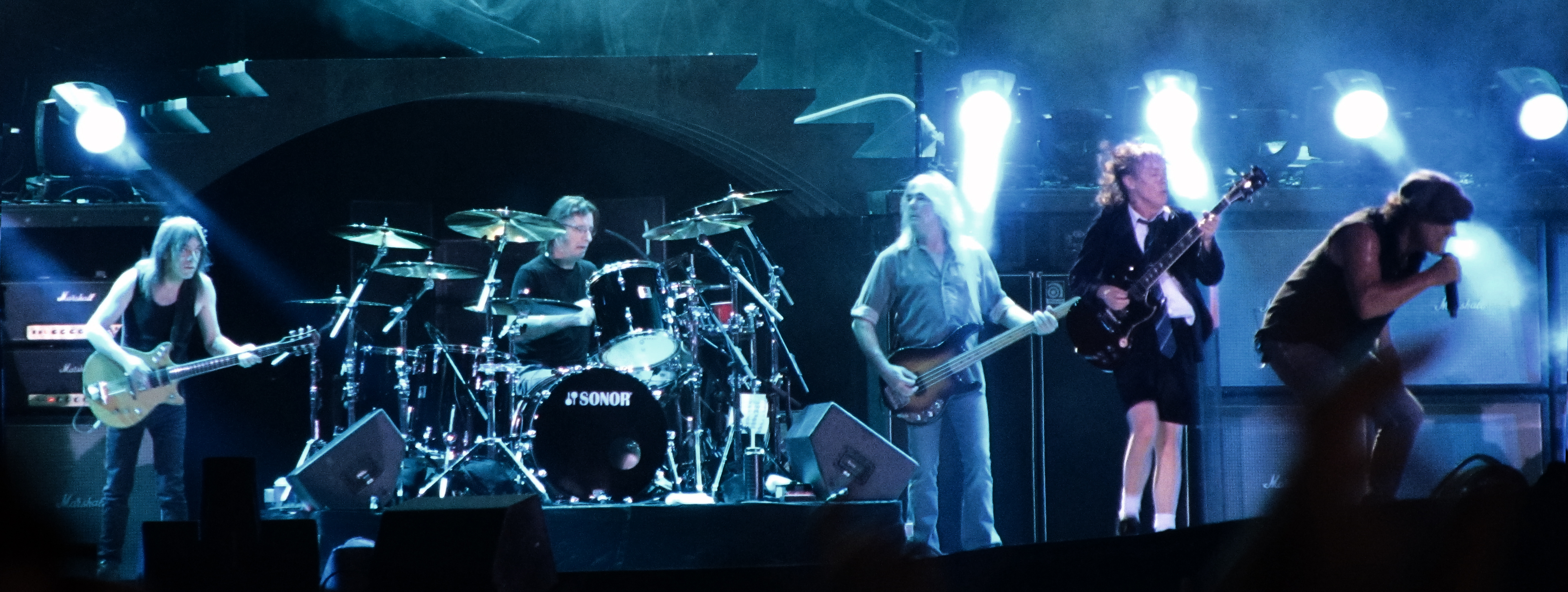
- 2011 winner AC/DC
- Country: Australia
- Presented by: Australian Recording Industry Association (ARIA)
- First award: 2004
- Final award: 2011
- Currently held by: AC/DC, Live at River Plate (2011)

Highlights
- Most nominations: Powderfinger (3)
- Website: ariaawards.com.au

The ARIA Music Award for Best Music DVD, was an award presented at the annual ARIA Music Awards, which recognises "the many achievements of Aussie artists across all music genres", since 1987. It was handed out by the Australian Recording Industry Association (ARIA), an organisation whose aim is "to advance the interests of the Australian record industry." Best Music DVD was first presented in 2004, for work by a solo artist or group, at the ARIA Awards ceremony. For its final year, in 2011, it was presented at the ARIA Artisan Awards ceremony. Compilations were entered for this category. Content was at least 60% original. The release was eligible to appear on the ARIA Music DVD chart, which means "bonus disc" releases were not eligible. Not counting various artists releases, the only artists to receive multiple nominations in this category were You Am I in 2004 and 2007, winning in the latter year, and Powderfinger in 2005, 2008 and 2011, winning along with Silverchair in 2008.

== Winners and nominees ==
In the following table, the winner is highlighted in a separate colour, and in boldface; the nominees are those that are not highlighted or in boldface.

Winner marked in a separate colour

Year	Winner(s)	Album title
**2004** (18th)
**2004** (18th)	**Midnight Oil**	**Best of Both Worlds**
**2004** (18th)	Grinspoon	23 Hours of Waiting Around
**2004** (18th)	INXS	I'm Only Looking
**2004** (18th)	Pete Murray	Passing Time
**2004** (18th)	You Am I	The Cream & the Crock
**2005** (19th)
**2005** (19th)	**Jet**	**Right! Right! Right!**
**2005** (19th)	Hoodoo Gurus	Tunnel Vision
**2005** (19th)	Powderfinger	These Days: Live in Concert
**2005** (19th)	The Dissociatives	Sydney Circa 2004/08
**2005** (19th)	Various Artists	WaveAid
**2006** (20th)
**2006** (20th)	**Eskimo Joe**	**Eskimo Joe**
**2006** (20th)	Hilltop Hoods	The Calling Live
**2006** (20th)	Kylie Minogue	Showgirl: The Greatest Hits Tour
**2006** (20th)	Missy Higgins	If You Tell Me Yours, I'll Tell You Mine
**2006** (20th)	The Go-Betweens	That Striped Sunlight Sound
**2007** (21st)
**2007** (21st)	**You Am I**	**Who Are They, These Rock Stars Live at the Mint**
**2007** (21st)	Kisschasy	Kisschasy: The Movie
**2007** (21st)	The Grates	Till Death Do Us Party
**2007** (21st)	The Living End	Live at Festival Hall
**2007** (21st)	Various	The Countdown Spectacular
**2008** (22nd)
**2008** (22nd)	**Powderfinger** & **Silverchair**	**Across the Great Divide Tour**
**2008** (22nd)	Hilltop Hoods	The City of Light
**2008** (22nd)	Paul Kelly	Live Apples
**2008** (22nd)	The John Butler Trio	Live at Federation Square
**2008** (22nd)	Wolfmother	Please Experience Wolfmother Live
**2009** (23rd)
**2009** (23rd)	**Sia**	**TV Is My Parent**
**2009** (23rd)	Jimmy Barnes	Live at the Enmore
**2009** (23rd)	Kasey Chambers & Shane Nicholson	Rattlin' Bones Max Sessions
**2009** (23rd)	The Cat Empire	Live at the Bowl
**2009** (23rd)	Various	RocKwiz Salutes the Bowl
**2010** (24th)
**2010** (24th)	**Various Artists**	**Sound Relief**
**2010** (24th)	Birds of Tokyo	The Broken Strings Tour DVD
**2010** (24th)	Bliss n Eso	Flying Colours Live
**2010** (24th)	Josh Pyke	The Lighthouse
**2010** (24th)	Various Artists	Before Too Long: Triple J's Tribute to Paul Kelly
**2011** (25th)
**2011** (25th)	**AC/DC**	**Live at River Plate**
**2011** (25th)	Powderfinger	Sunsets Farewell Tour
**2011** (25th)	RocKwiz	Live National Tour
**2011** (25th)	Tex Perkins	The Man in Black
**2011** (25th)	Various	Triple J's One Night Stand
