= Triple J's Hottest 100 of 1995 =

Australian radio station's popular songs list

1995 Triple J Hottest 100
- Album artwork for the CD compilation

Countdown details
- Date of countdown: January 1996

Countdown highlights
- Winning song: Oasis "Wonderwall"
- Most entries: TISM; Red Hot Chili Peppers; Live; You Am I Alanis Morissette; Green Day (3 tracks each)

Chronology
← Previous; 1994	Next → 1996

The 1995 Triple J Hottest 100, counted down in January 1996, was a countdown of the most popular songs of the year, according to listeners of the Australian radio station Triple J. A CD featuring 32 of the songs was released. A countdown of the videos of most of the songs was also shown on the ABC music series Rage.

Listeners were able to cast their votes by phone, or via the internet. Approximately 97,500 votes were received.

== Full list ==
Note: Australian artists

#	Song	Artist	Country of origin
1	Wonderwall	Oasis	United Kingdom
2	Bullet with Butterfly Wings	The Smashing Pumpkins	United States
3	Gangsta's Paradise	Coolio featuring L.V.	United States
4	Kitty	The Presidents of the United States of America	United States
5	It's Oh So Quiet	Björk	Iceland
6	Heroin Girl	Everclear	United States
7	Apartment	Custard	Australia
8	Where the Wild Roses Grow	Nick Cave & the Bad Seeds and Kylie Minogue	Australia
9	(He'll Never Be An) Ol' Man River	TISM	Australia
10	Greg! The Stop Sign!!	TISM	Australia
11	Lump	The Presidents of the United States of America	United States
12	The Reefer Song	Mindless Drug Hoover	United Kingdom
13	Morning Glory	Oasis	United Kingdom
14	Last Goodbye	Jeff Buckley	United States
15	Vow	Garbage	United States
16	Rock 'n' Roll Is Where I Hide	Dave Graney 'n' The Coral Snakes	Australia
17	Blubber Boy	Regurgitator	Australia
18	I Kissed a Girl	Jill Sobule	United States
19	I Got a Girl	Tripping Daisy	United States
20	My Friends	Red Hot Chili Peppers	United States
21	Queer	Garbage	United States
22	Lightning Crashes	Live	United States
23	Miss Sarajevo	Passengers featuring Luciano Pavarotti	Ireland/United Kingdom/Italy
24	Purple Sneakers	You Am I	Australia
25	Political Prisoners	Insurge	Australia
26	Downtown	Neil Young	Canada
27	Drugs	Ammonia	Australia
28	Aeroplane	Red Hot Chili Peppers	United States
29	Evidence	Faith No More	United States
30	Carnival	Natalie Merchant	United States
31	Time Bomb	Rancid	United States
32	Apple Eyes	Swoop	Australia
33	Everything Zen	Bush	United Kingdom
34	I Alone	Live	United States
35	I Got Id	Pearl Jam	United States
36	Black Steel	Tricky	United Kingdom
37	This Is a Call	Foo Fighters	United States
38	Common People	Pulp	United Kingdom
39	You Oughta Know	Alanis Morissette	Canada
40	Wynona's Big Brown Beaver	Primus	United States
41	I Can Dream	Skunk Anansie	United Kingdom
42	The Diamond Sea	Sonic Youth	United States
43	Monty	Spiderbait	Australia
44	Better Man	Pearl Jam	United States
45	Glory Box	Portishead	United Kingdom
46	Geek Stink Breath	Green Day	United States
47	Island Home	Christine Anu	Australia
48	I Wanna Be A Hippy	Technohead	United Kingdom
49	More Human than Human	White Zombie	United States
50	Summer	Buffalo Tom	United States
51	Psychoactive Summer	Def FX	Australia
52	You Suck	The Murmurs	United States
53	Country House	Blur	United Kingdom
54	Who Farted?	The Vaughans	Australia
55	Up to Our Necks in It	Skunkhour	Australia
56	Chuck	Phunk Junkeez	United States
57	Hold Me, Thrill Me, Kiss Me, Kill Me	U2	Ireland
58	Lemonsuck	Pollyanna	Australia
59	Supermodel	Jill Sobule	United States
60	Sparky's Dream	Teenage Fanclub	United Kingdom
61	Sad Song	The Screaming Jets	Australia
62	Empty	Rebecca's Empire	Australia
63	Smash It Up	The Offspring	United States
64	Stayin' Alive	N-Trance featuring Ricardo da Force	United Kingdom
65	Boombastic	Shaggy	Jamaica
66	Fire in the Head	The Tea Party	Canada
67	Baby Did a Bad Bad Thing	Chris Isaak	United States
68	Pale Grey Eyes	Pollyanna	Australia
69	(Let's Go) Smoke Some Pot	Dash Rip Rock	United States
70	I'll Stick Around	Foo Fighters	United States
71	All Over You	Live	United States
72	Immune Deficiency	Rail	Australia
73	Dredd Song	The Cure	United Kingdom
74	Sickfest	Grinspoon	Australia
75	Warped	Red Hot Chili Peppers	United States
76	21st Century (Digital Boy)	Bad Religion	United States
77	Heart of the Party	Severed Heads	Australia
78	Trick with a Knife	Strawpeople	New Zealand
79	Alright	Supergrass	United Kingdom
80	Brain Stew	Green Day	United States
81	Devil's Diary	The Caulfields	United States
82	Sunday	Mr Blonde	Australia
83	Army of Me	Björk	Iceland
84	Cathy's Clown	You Am I	Australia
85	Hand in My Pocket	Alanis Morissette	Canada
86	Waterfalls	TLC	United States
87	Jailbreak	Yothu Yindi	Australia
88	Grind	Alice in Chains	United States
89	Grace	Jeff Buckley	United States
90	All I Really Want	Alanis Morissette	Canada
91	Digging the Grave	Faith No More	United States
92	Sick of Myself	Matthew Sweet	United States
93	All Homeboys Are Dickheads	TISM	Australia
94	Jewels and Bullets	You Am I	Australia
95	Protection	Massive Attack	United Kingdom
96	Hang Around	Tumbleweed	Australia
97	Tingly	Pop! featuring Angie Hart	Australia
98	By Myself	Hecate	Australia
99	When I Come Around	Green Day	United States
100	Talkin' Seattle Grunge Rock Blues	Todd Snider	United States

== Statistics ==
=== Artists with multiple entries ===
#	Artist	Tracks
3	TISM	9, 10, 93
3	Red Hot Chili Peppers	20, 28, 75
3	Live	22, 34, 71
3	You Am I	24, 84, 94
3	Alanis Morissette	39, 85, 90
3	Green Day	46, 80, 99
2	Oasis	1, 13
2	The Presidents of the United States of America	4, 11
2	Björk	5, 83
2	Jeff Buckley	14, 89
2	Garbage	15, 21
2	Jill Sobule	18, 59
2	U2 (Note: Once with Brian Eno as Passengers, and once as U2)	23, 57
2	Faith No More	29, 91
2	Pearl Jam	35, 44
2	Foo Fighters	37, 70
2	Pollyanna	58, 68

==== Countries represented ====
Nation	Total
United States	44
Australia	30
United Kingdom	16
Canada	5
Iceland	2
Ireland	2
Jamaica	1
New Zealand	1

== CD release ==
Disc 1
1. Oasis – "Wonderwall" (4:22)
2. Coolio – "Gangsta's Paradise" (4:00)
3. Everclear – "Heroin Girl" (2:21)
4. Custard – "Apartment" (2:22)
5. Nick Cave and the Bad Seeds and Kylie Minogue – "Where the Wild Roses Grow" (3:55)
6. TISM – "(He'll Never Be An) Ol' Man River" (2:23)
7. Mindless Drug Hoover – "The Reefer Song" (1:48)
8. Jeff Buckley – "Last Goodbye" (4:32)
9. Garbage – "Vow" (4:28)
10. Dave Graney 'n' the Coral Snakes – "Rock 'n' Roll Is Where I Hide" (5:44)
11. Regurgitator – "Blubber Boy" (2:42)
12. Jill Sobule – "I Kissed a Girl" (3:10)
13. Tripping Daisy – "I Got a Girl" (4:04)
14. You Am I – "Purple Sneakers" (3:28)
15. Insurge – "Political Prisoners" (3:35)
16. Ammonia – "Drugs" (3:27)
Disc 2
1. Faith No More – "Evidence" (4:52)
2. Swoop – "Apple Eyes" (3:21)
3. Foo Fighters – "This Is a Call" (3:53)
4. Pulp – "Common People" (5:50)
5. Skunk Anansie – "I Can Dream" (3:32)
6. Spiderbait – "Monty" (2:31)
7. Portishead – "Glory Box" (5:01)
8. Christine Anu – "Island Home" (3:47)
9. Technohead – "I Wanna Be A Hippy" (3:15)
10. White Zombie – "More Human than Human" (4:27)
11. Buffalo Tom – "Summer" (4:01)
12. Def FX – "Psychoactive Summer" (4:16)
13. Skunkhour – "Up to Our Necks in It" (4:03)
14. Pollyanna – "Lemonsuck" (3:34)
15. The Screaming Jets – "Sad Song" (2:53)
16. Rebecca's Empire – "Empty" (3:09)

=== Certifications ===
Region	Certification	Certified units/sales
Australia (ARIA)	2× Platinum	140,000^{^}
^{^} Shipments figures based on certification alone.

== See also ==
- 1995 in music
