= Be Prepared =

Be Prepared may refer to:

- "Be Prepared", the Scout Motto of the Scouting movement
- "Be Prepared", a song originally on Tom Lehrer's studio album Songs by Tom Lehrer parodying the Scouts
- "Be Prepared" (song), a song originally from the Disney film The Lion King
- "Be Prepared" (Tim Rogers song), an alternative rock song
- "Be Prepared" (That's So Raven), an episode of That's So Raven
