= David Lane (musician) =

Australian musician

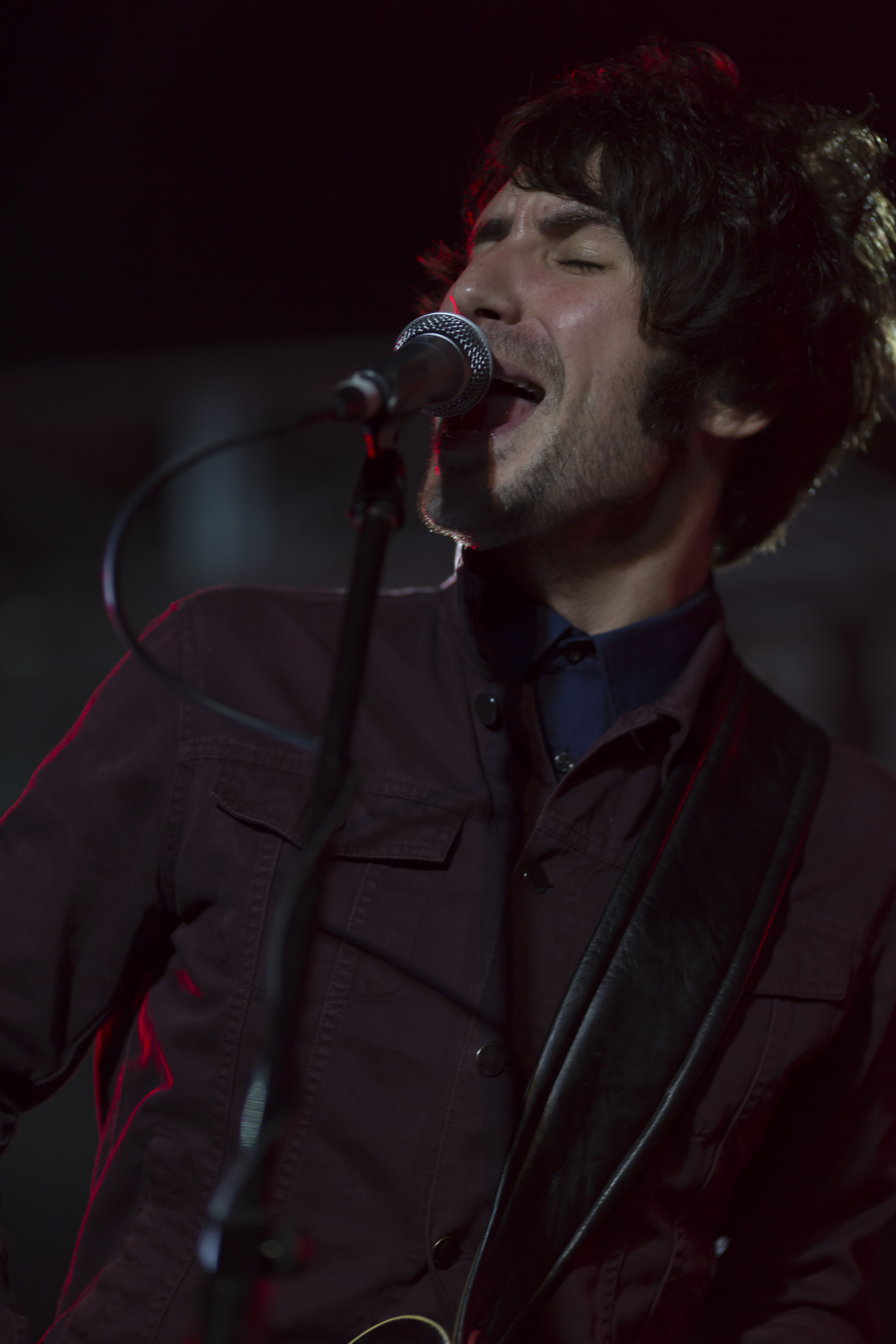
- Lane performing with You Am I at the Kidgeeridge Music Festival in May 2015

Background information
- Born: David Daniel Lane; 31 January 1981 (age 45); Melbourne, Victoria, Australia
- Genre: Rock
- Occupation: Musician
- Instruments: Guitar; vocals; keyboards; drums
- Years active: 1999–present

David Daniel Lane (born 31 January 1981) is an Australian musician. He is a solo artist and lead guitarist of You Am I (since 1999). He was also lead singer-guitarist of The Pictures (from 2000) and member of Australian supergroup, The Wrights.

== Biography ==
As a teenager, Davey Lane transcribed the guitar parts for Australian alternative rock group, You Am I's, website. He provided lead guitar as a session musician for the group's founding mainstay Tim Rogers on his debut solo album, What Rhymes with Cars and Girls, which was released in March 1999. To promote the album, Rogers formed The Twin Set as his backing band, including Lane alongside Jen Anderson on violin; Ian Kitney on drums; and Stuart Speed on upright bass. When You Am I reconvened in July that year, Lane joined as a second guitarist for the band.

Lane's first recorded work with You Am I is the live album, ...Saturday Night, 'Round Ten, which was issued in September 1999. It had been recorded at the Casa del Resaca Warehouse in Richmond, in July. His first studio album with the group, Dress Me Slowly, appeared in April 2001. Australian music journalist, Ed Nimmervoll, felt that Lane's addition was "an important change" as it gave the group "extra guitar bite both on stage and in the studio".

Also in 2001, Lane formed a side-project, the alternative rock group, The Pictures, with Leigh White on bass guitar and Brett Wolfenden on drums. Their debut single, "You'll See", appeared on the Illustrious Artists label that same year. They followed with a four-track debut extended play, I Dealt a Rollercoaster, in 2002. Fist2Face's reviewer describes their work as the "sound of the modern world colliding with blood, sweat and wood to create timeless, melodic rock music. High on total energy yet grounded by killer hooks and playing". Craig Mathieson of The Sydney Morning Herald noted their style "alternated between impassioned Neil Young workouts and Who-like eruptions".

In January 2004, Lane was nominated as Best Lead Guitarist at the inaugural Jack Awards. In October that year Nic Cester of Jet organised a charity project, The Wrights, to raise money for Australian musician, Stevie Wright. The supergroup recorded a cover version of Wright's signature song, "Evie", which was an 11-minute hit single from 1974. Lane provided rhythm guitar for Part 1 of "Evie", titled "Let Your Hair Hang Down" and lead guitar for Part 3, "I'm Losing You". On 29 January 2005 Lane performed "Evie" with The Wrights at Waveaid in relief of the 2004 Indian Ocean earthquake and tsunami, presented at the Sydney Cricket Ground. "Evie" by The Wrights was issued in February 2005, which peaked at No. 2 on the ARIA Singles Chart.

Since 2005, Lane has periodically played in Jimmy Barnes' backing band for touring and live recording. In June 2005 The Pictures' debut album, Pieces of Eight, appeared. Mathieson felt that its "best moments, such as the melancholic 'All My Ties' and opener 'Stupid Me', forsake the usual bravado of first albums for a more reflective tone". In 2007 he joined Crowded House for their tour in Europe and Australia, temporarily replacing Liam Finn on miscellaneous guitar, keyboard and backup vocal duties. Late in 2008 Lane's groups each released an album: both You Am I's Dilettantes (September) and The Pictures' Kicking Indifference (November).

On 6 September 2013, Lane issued his debut solo extended play, The Good Borne of Bad Tymes, which was supported by a national tour in September and October. The Herald's Jade Lazarevic described its "five tracks are a departure from Lane’s retro rock roots, with synths influenced by '70s groups such as the Gary Numan-fronted Tubeway Army and German electronic pioneers Kraftwerk working their way into the sound and even a 'space rock jam' track". He joined The Stems in November 2017 replacing the late Richard Lane (no relation) and toured Europe April/May 2018 for the 30th anniversary of the group's debt album "At First Sight Violets Are Blue".

In 2018, he formed a group to back the legendary Todd Rundgren for an Australian tour. According to Lane, they have also collaborated in the studio on upcoming releases. In 2025, Lane's band toured with Rundgren again, this time in Australia and Japan.

Since 2016, he has also performed periodically as touring guitarist for Robyn Hitchcock.

== Movies, television and media ==
- Contributed to the Dirty Deeds soundtrack.
- Lane has made multiple appearances on talk shows and musical presentation programs such as Rove Live, RocKwiz, JTV (now known as Triple J TV), The Carnival with Roy and HG, The Fat, Studio 22, The Gig, 10:30 Slot, as well as getting the honorable privilege of programming the music video program Rage (ABC) with You Am I in 2006.
- He is also webmaster and an occasional presenter on Melbourne Community Radio station Stereo 974's Let It Be Beatles program.

== Discography ==
=== Albums ===
List of albums, with selected details
Title	Details
Under the Covers	Released: 2014; Format: CD; Label: Field Recordings
Atonally Young	Released: 2014; Format: LP, CD, digital; Label: Field Recordings (FRCD002)
BackHereForward: A Best of 2013-2017	Released: 2017; Format: CD; Label: Capgun Kids (CAPGUN1008)
I'm Gonna Burn Out Bright	Released: August 2017; Format: LP, CD, digital; Label: Capgun Kids (CAPGUN1010)
Don't Bank Your Heart on It	Released: 2020; Format: LP, CD, digital; Label: Field Recordings (FRV006)
How to Make Davey: Volume One	Released: 2024; Format: digital; Label: Cheersquad Records
Finally, A Party Record	Released: 2025; Format: LP, digital; Label: Cheersquad Records

=== Extended plays ===
List of albums, with selected details
Title	Details
The Good Borne of Bad Tymes	Released: 2013; Format: CD; Label: Field Recordings (FRCD 001)

=== See also ===
- You Am I
- The Pictures

== Awards and nominations ==
=== Music Victoria Awards ===
The Music Victoria Awards, are an annual awards night celebrating Victorian music. They commenced in 2005.

Year	Nominee / work	Award	Result	Ref.
2019	David Lane	Best Male Musician	Nominated	
2021	David Lane	Best Musician	Nominated	
