= Triple J's Hottest 100 of All Time, 1998 =

Australian popular music poll

1998 All Time Triple J Hottest 100

Countdown details
- Date of countdown: 7 June 1998

Countdown highlights
- Winning song: Nirvana "Smells Like Teen Spirit"
- Most entries: The Cure (5 tracks)

Chronology
← Previous; 1997	Next → 1998

The Triple J Hottest 100 of All Time was a music poll broadcast on 7 June 1998, amongst listeners of Australian youth radio network Triple J. Nirvana's "Smells Like Teen Spirit" collected the highest number of votes to claim the top position. Voters could submit a list of up to ten different songs as well as nominating one of these as their "all-time" favourite song. It was the fourth such poll organised by Triple J, following similar polls in 1989, 1990 and 1991. Initially, all songs were eligible for the annual Triple J Hottest 100. However, from 1993 onwards (after having no list in 1992), only songs released in the previous year were permitted. Thus, the Hottest 100 of All Time is conducted via a separate vote, held irregularly to reflect listeners' favourite songs across all eras.

== Full list ==
- Bold: Previous winner of a Hottest 100
- Green background: Australian artists

#	Song	Artist	Country of origin	Year	Annual Hottest 100 position	Previous Hottest 100 of all time positions
1	**Smells Like Teen Spirit**	**Nirvana**	**United States**	**1991**		**1 (1991)**
2	Throw Your Arms Around Me	Hunters & Collectors	Australia	1984		2 (1989), 2 (1990), 4 (1991)
3	Alive	Pearl Jam	United States	1991		
4	Last Goodbye	Jeff Buckley	United States	1994	14 (1995)	
5	Creep	Radiohead	United Kingdom	1992	2 (1993)	
6	Stairway to Heaven	Led Zeppelin	United Kingdom	1971		30 (1989), 61 (1990), 30 (1991)
7	One	Metallica	United States	1988		89 (1991)
8	Bohemian Rhapsody	Queen	United Kingdom	1975		49 (1991)
9	Enter Sandman	Metallica	United States	1991		60 (1991)
10	Black	Pearl Jam	United States	1991		
11	One	U2	Ireland	1992		
12	The Beautiful People	Marilyn Manson	United States	1996	8 (1997)	
13	Paranoid Android	Radiohead	United Kingdom	1997	7	
14	Closer	Nine Inch Nails	United States	1994	2	
15	Blister in the Sun	Violent Femmes	United States	1983		46 (1989), 41 (1990), 9 (1991)
16	**Love Will Tear Us Apart**	**Joy Division**	**United Kingdom**	**1980**		**1 (1989), 1 (1990), 2 (1991)**
17	Killing in the Name	Rage Against the Machine	United States	1992	6 (1993)	
18	Prisoner of Society	The Living End	Australia	1997	15	
19	Epic	Faith No More	United States	1989		
20	Dammit	Blink 182	United States	1997	6	
21	Lightning Crashes	Live	United States	1994	22 (1995)	
22	Better Man	Pearl Jam	United States	1994	44 (1995)	
23	With or Without You	U2	Ireland	1987		
24	Stinkfist	Tool	United States	1996	2	
25	Tainted Love	Soft Cell	United Kingdom	1981		38 (1990), 54 (1991)
26	The Ship Song	Nick Cave & The Bad Seeds	Australia	1990	22 (1993) (Note: Live version)	14 (1991)
27	Cornflake Girl	Tori Amos	United States	1994	35	
28	How Soon Is Now?	The Smiths	United Kingdom	1985		7 (1989), 3 (1990), 6 (1991)
29	Grace	Jeff Buckley	United States	1994	89 (1995)	
30	Blue Monday	New Order	United Kingdom	1983		5 (1989), 5 (1990), 10 (1991)
31	Under the Bridge	Red Hot Chili Peppers	United States	1991		
32	Brick	Ben Folds Five	United States	1997		
33	Bullet with Butterfly Wings	The Smashing Pumpkins	United States	1995	2	
34	Unfinished Sympathy	Massive Attack	United Kingdom	1991		64 (1991)
35	Ashes to Ashes	Faith No More	United States	1997	31	
**36**	**No Aphrodisiac**	**The Whitlams**	**Australia**	**1997**	**1**	
37	Love Shack	The B-52's	United States	1989		88 (1990)
38	(You Gotta) Fight for Your Right (To Party!)	Beastie Boys	United States	1987		
39	Fools Gold	The Stone Roses	United Kingdom	1989		6 (1990), 7 (1991)
40	Today	The Smashing Pumpkins	United States	1993	25 (1994)	
41	Wish You Were Here	Pink Floyd	United Kingdom	1975		33 (1989), 35 (1990), 58 (1991)
42	Tomorrow Wendy	Andy Prieboy	United States	1990		5 (1991)
43	You Sound Like Louis Burdett	The Whitlams	Australia	1997	53	
44	Sabotage	Beastie Boys	United States	1994	16	
45	Lithium	Nirvana	United States	1991		3 (1991)
46	Song 2	Blur	United Kingdom	1997	2	
47	Lover, You Should've Come Over	Jeff Buckley	United States	1994		
48	Sober	Tool	United States	1993	27	
49	A Day in the Life	The Beatles	United Kingdom	1967		69 (1989)
50	Leaving Home	Jebediah	Australia	1997	10	
51	Everybody Hurts	R.E.M.	United States	1992	11 (1993)	
52	Underground	Ben Folds Five	United States	1995	3 (1996)	
53	Groove Is in the Heart	Deee-Lite	United States	1990		
54	Karma Police	Radiohead	United Kingdom	1997	9	
55	Come Out and Play	The Offspring	United States	1994	4	
56	Rearviewmirror	Pearl Jam	United States	1993		
57	Forty-Six & 2	Tool	United States	1996	30 (1997)	
58	Black Hole Sun	Soundgarden	United States	1994	22	
59	Tomorrow	Silverchair	Australia	1994	5	
60	Bizarre Love Triangle	New Order	United Kingdom	1986		67 (1989), 21 (1990), 24 (1991)
61	Berlin Chair	You Am I	Australia	1993	23 (1993)	
62	Come as You Are	Nirvana	United States	1991		76 (1991)
63	Kashmir	Led Zeppelin	United Kingdom	1975		
64	I Will Survive	Cake	United States	1996	20 (1997)	
65	Hotel California	Eagles	United States	1977		
66	The Love Cats	The Cure	United Kingdom	1983		67 (1990), 70 (1991)
67	Anarchy in the U.K.	Sex Pistols	United Kingdom	1976		17 (1989), 20 (1990), 25 (1991)
68	Holy Grail	Hunters & Collectors	Australia	1992	54 (1993)	
69	Been Caught Stealing	Jane's Addiction	United States	1990		15 (1991)
70	All Along the Watchtower	The Jimi Hendrix Experience	United Kingdom	1968		49 (1989), 83 (1990), 61 (1991)
71	1979	The Smashing Pumpkins	United States	1996	13	
72	The Perfect Drug	Nine Inch Nails	United States	1997	26	
73	Losing My Religion	R.E.M.	United States	1991		32 (1991)
74	A Forest	The Cure	United Kingdom	1980		10 (1989), 11 (1990), 8 (1991)
75	Glory Box	Portishead	United Kingdom	1994	45 (1995)	
76	Don't Dream It's Over	Crowded House	Australia	1986		
77	Sweet Child O' Mine	Guns N' Roses	United States	1987		27 (1991)
78	Birdhouse in Your Soul	They Might Be Giants	United States	1989		46 (1991)
79	Video Killed the Radio Star	The Buggles	United Kingdom	1979		
80	Self Esteem	The Offspring	United States	1994	3	
81	No Rain	Blind Melon	United States	1992	4 (1993)	
82	Jerks of Attention	Jebediah	Australia	1996		
83	Abuse Me	Silverchair	Australia	1997		
84	Into My Arms	Nick Cave & the Bad Seeds	Australia	1997	18	
85	Just Like Heaven	The Cure	United Kingdom	1987		25 (1990), 11 (1991)
**86**	**Buy Me a Pony**	**Spiderbait**	**Australia**	**1996**	**1**	
87	Aneurysm	Nirvana	United States	1996	45	
88	Just Ace	Grinspoon	Australia	1997		
89	Close to Me	The Cure	United Kingdom	1985		66 (1989), 37 (1991)
90	Comfortably Numb	Pink Floyd	United Kingdom	1979		95 (1990), 73 (1991)
91	The Unforgiven	Metallica	United States	1991		63 (1991)
92	Backdoor Man	Pauline Pantsdown	Australia	1997	5	
93	I Still Haven't Found What I'm Looking For	U2	Ireland	1987		
94	Khe Sanh	Cold Chisel	Australia	1978		95 (1989)
95	Breathe	The Prodigy	United Kingdom	1996	7	
96	Red Right Hand	Nick Cave & the Bad Seeds	Australia	1994		
97	Loser	Beck	United States	1993	45 (1994)	
98	Boys Don't Cry	The Cure	United Kingdom	1980		29 (1989), 23 (1990), 43 (1991)
99	Bitter Sweet Symphony	The Verve	United Kingdom	1997	4	
100	"Heroes"	David Bowie	United Kingdom	1977		39 (1989), 50 (1990)

== Statistics ==
=== Artists with multiple entries ===
#	Artist	Tracks
5	The Cure	66, 74, 85, 89, 98
4	Nirvana	1, 45, 62, 87
4	Pearl Jam	3, 10, 22, 56
3	Jeff Buckley	4, 29, 47
3	Radiohead	5, 13, 54
3	Metallica	7, 9, 91
3	Peter Hook (Note: Once with Joy Division (16), twice with New Order (30, 60))	16, 30, 60
3	Stephen Morris	16, 30, 60
3	Bernard Sumner	16, 30, 60
3	U2	11, 23, 93
3	Tool	24, 48, 57
3	Nick Cave and the Bad Seeds	26, 84, 96
3	The Smashing Pumpkins	33, 40, 71
2	Hunters & Collectors	2, 68
2	Led Zeppelin	6, 63
2	Nine Inch Nails	14, 72
2	Faith No More	19, 35
2	New Order	30, 60
2	Ben Folds Five	32, 52
2	The Whitlams	36, 43
2	Beastie Boys	38, 44
2	Pink Floyd	41, 90
2	Jebediah	50, 82
2	R.E.M.	51, 73
2	The Offspring	55, 80
2	Silverchair	59, 83

=== Countries Represented ===
Country	Tracks
United States	51
United Kingdom	28
Australia	18
Ireland	3

=== Songs by Decade ===
Decade	Song Count
1960s	2
1970s	11
1980s	19
1990s	68

=== Records ===
- It was marked with a comical moment when Robbie Buck played the wrong Led Zeppelin song.
- Grinspoon's track "Just Ace", which reached #88 and Ben Folds Five's track "Brick" which came #32 is to date the only song to chart in an All Time countdown before an official yearly countdown.
- Grinspoon are the first Triple J Unearthed artist to appear in a Hottest 100 Of All Time countdown.
- Excluding the Hottest 100 Australian Albums of All Time and the Hottest 100 of Australian Songs, the appearance of only 4 countries (Australia, Ireland, United Kingdom, United States) is the lowest number of countries to appear in any countdown.
