= Can't Get Started =

EP by You Am I
- Released: October 1992
- Genre: Grunge
- Label: rooArt Records

You Am I chronology
Goddamn (EP) (1992)	Can't Get Started (1992)	Coprolalia (EP) (1993)

Can't Get Started is the third EP released by You Am I, in October 1992. It was You Am I's first release on Ra Records, a sub-branch of rooArt Records.

== Track listing ==
All songs: Rogers/You Am I

1. "Grand Ted"
2. "Rational Hell"
3. "Goddamn"
4. "IOU2"
5. "Frog"

== Personnel ==
- Tim Rogers – vocals, guitar
- Andy Kent – bass, backing vocals
- Mark Tunaley – drums

== Charts ==
Chart performance for Goddamn
Chart (1992–1993)	Peak position
Australia (ARIA)	177
