= Hi Fi Way =

Studio album by You Am I
- Released: February 1995
- Recorded: May – 22 September 1994
- Studios: Greene St. Studios, New York City; Paradise Studios, Sydney
- Genre: Alternative rock
- Length: 41:45
- Labels: rooArt; WEA
- Producer: Lee Ranaldo

You Am I chronology
Sound as Ever (1993)	Hi Fi Way (1995)	Hourly, Daily (1996)

Hi Fi Way is the second album by Australian rock band You Am I, released in 1995. Hi Fi Way was You Am I's first release with new drummer Rusty Hopkinson (formerly of Nursery Crimes) after the departure of former drummer Mark Tunaley.

Hi Fi Way reached #1 on the local albums chart and is one of the most influential and critically acclaimed Australian albums of the 1990s. In 2008, it was voted the sixth greatest Australian album of all time in The Age newspaper's 50 Greatest Aussie Albums poll. In October 2010, it was listed at No. 8 in the book, 100 Best Australian Albums.

The album included the singles "Cathy's Clown", "Jewels and Bullets" and "Purple Sneakers".

You Am I's Tim Rogers later said of the album, "I was really high and really drunk the whole time. My ambition for it was always huge, but we're more suited to a scrappier sounding thing, with the way that I sing and play guitar. We had seven days to make it, living in New York."

== Reception ==
Professional ratings
Review scores
Source	Rating
AllMusic	4.5/5 stars

Rolling Stone Australia said Hi Fi Way was "a truly exceptional album, topping many people's list for Best of the Year. Period. Tim Rogers has a strong ear for melody, a telling eye for detail and the ability to make the listener feel a part of his somewhat solitary world."

In a retrospective piece titled "You Am I Is the Longest Love Affair I Have Ever Had", FasterLouder writer A. H. Cayley singled out Hi Fi Way and Hourly, Daily as the two high points of the band's career, which You Am I fans speak of with a "hushed reverence".

Trouser Press said the album "displays huge leaps forward in songwriting, production and performance. Ranaldo's production and Hopkinson's dashboard-smacking drumming strike that just-so pop/rock balance, a less aggressive but tighter version of the Replacements in their prime."

== 2013 reissues, concert tour ==
In 2013, You Am I reissued remastered versions of Sound as Ever, Hi Fi Way, and Hourly, Daily with bonus discs featuring B-sides, out-takes and live recordings. In the winter of 2013, the band toured major cities of Australia on the Hi Fi Daily Double Tour, performing both Hourly, Daily and Hi Fi Way in their entirety, followed by an encore of other songs from these reissued collections. Vinyl versions of the three albums were released for the first time to coincide with this tour. In turn, a live recording from the 2013 tour was released as a vinyl/DVD box set titled Live Electrified in 2014.

== Track listing ==
All songs by Rogers/You Am I

1. "Ain't Gone And Open"
2. "Minor Byrd"
3. "She Digs Her"
4. "Cathy's Clown"
5. "Jewels and Bullets"
6. "Purple Sneakers"
7. "Pizza Guy"
8. "The Applecross Wing Commander"
9. "Stray"
10. "Handwasher"
11. "Punkarella"
12. "Ken (The Mother Nature's Son)"
13. "Gray"
14. "How Much Is Enough"

=== Someone Else's Crowd ===
Some copies of the album came with a live bonus disc, featuring songs recorded on tour in Seattle in 1994.

1. "Sound As Ever"
2. "Hi Fi Way"
3. "When You Got Dry"
4. "Forever and Easy"
5. "Berlin Chair"
6. "Adam's Ribs"
7. "Cool Hand Luke"

== Personnel ==
- Tim Rogers – vocals, guitars, Mellotron, Hammond organ
- Andy Kent – bass guitar
- Rusty Hopkinson – drums, cymbals, percussion, "Fremantle reminiscences"
- Jon Auer – Hammond organ on "Minor Byrd"
- Epic Soundtracks – keyboards on "Gray"
- Lee Ranaldo – production
- Wayne Connolly – lead guitar transcription on "Gray", recording on "How Much Is Enough" and "Ken"

== Charts ==
Chart performance for Hi Fi Way
Chart (1995)	Peak position
Australian Albums (ARIA)	1

== Certifications ==
Certifications for Hi Fi Way
Region	Certification	Certified units/sales
Australia (ARIA)	Gold	35,000^{^}
^{^} Shipments figures based on certification alone.
