= Damage (You Am I song) =

2000 single by You Am I

Single by You Am I

from the album Dress Me Slowly
- B-side: "She Don't Need the Morning"; "One Cent Coins"; "Open All Night"
- Released: 30 October 2000
- Studio: Q (Sydney, Australia)
- Length: 3:27
- Label: RCA; BMG
- Songwriter: Tim Rogers
- Producer: Clif Norrell

You Am I singles chronology
"Heavy Heart" (1998)	"Damage" (2000)	"Get Up" (2001)

"Damage" is a song by Australian rock band You Am I, released as the first single from their fifth studio album, Dress Me Slowly. It was released in October 2000 and reached number 37 on the Australian ARIA Singles Chart. It was also ranked at number 23 on that year's Triple J Hottest 100 poll.

== B-sides ==
The CD single of "Damage" contains three B-sides: "She Don't Need the Morning", "One Cent Coins" and "Open All Night", which are all You Am I originals written by frontman Tim Rogers. "Open All Night" was originally titled "Dress Me Slowly" and was destined to appear on Dress Me Slowly but was left off, as the band did not like having a song with the album's title on the album (despite having already done this on Sound as Ever and Hourly, Daily, as well as Deliverance and Dilettantes afterwards).

== Charts ==
Weekly chart performance for "Damage"
Chart (2000)	Peak position
Australia (ARIA)	37
