= Who Are They, These Rock Stars? =

Video by You Am I
- Released: December 1, 2006
- Genre: Rock
- Label: Virgin Records

You Am I chronology
The Cream & The Crock (2003)	Who Are They, These Rock Stars? (2006)

Who Are They, These Rock Stars? is a live video album by the rock band You Am I, which was recorded by Triple J at the launch of their seventh album, Convicts. It place at the Sydney Royal Mint and was a themed event, with the crowd invited to attend in Victorian clothing. The event was hosted by Triple J's Robbie Buck with an introduction by 'Governor' Tex Perkins, both of whom were also suitably attired. The DVD also features two music videos released after the band's previous DVD, The Cream & The Crock, as well as two photo galleries and an exclusive interview shot on the set of the "It Ain't Funny How We Don't Talk Anymore" music video.

At the ARIA Music Awards of 2007, the release won Best Music DVD.

== Track listing ==
=== Live at the Mint ===
1. Gunslingers
2. Friends Like You
3. The Sweet Life
4. Baby Clothes
5. Mr Milk
6. Cathy's Clown
7. It Ain't Funny How We Don't Talk Anymore
8. Berlin Chair
9. By My Own Hand
10. Good Mornin'
11. A Nervous Kid
12. How Much Is Enough
13. Constance George
14. Thank God I've Hit the Bottom
15. Trouble

=== Bonus material ===
- It Ain't Funny How We Don't Talk Anymore (music video)
- Friends Like You (music video)
- Interview (2006)
- It Ain't Funny How We Don't Talk Anymore (photo gallery)
- Friends Like You (photo gallery)
