= What I Don't Know 'bout You =

Single by You Am I

from the album #4 Record
- Released: February 1998
- Genre: Alternative rock
- Length: 3:10
- Label: rooArt
- Songwriter(s): Tim Rogers
- Producer(s): George Drakoulias

You Am I singles chronology
"Tuesday" (1997)	"What I Don't Know 'bout You" (1998)	"Rumble" (1998)

"What I Don't Know 'bout You" is the first single from the album #4 Record by Australian rock band You Am I. It was released in 1998 and reached number 28 on the Australian ARIA singles chart; the band's highest-charting single.

The group's lead singer Tim Rogers had mixed feelings about the track; he explained, "[it] was my favourite song that I'd written at that point. I loved the lyrics in particular, but it just wasn't recorded in the way I thought it should."

== Track listing ==
1. "What I Don't Know 'bout You" – 3:10
2. "You Want It So Bad" – 3:53
3. "Cathy's Clown" (live) – 2:54
4. "The Applecross Wing Commander" (live) – 5:59

"You Want It So Bad" is a You Am I original, which later appeared on the ...Saturday Night, 'Round Ten bonus disc, Ignorance and Vodka. The live performances of "Cathy's Clown" and "The Applecross Wing Commander" were recorded at the 1997 Reading Festival in the UK.

== Music video ==
The music video for "What I Don't Know 'bout You" is a tribute to 1976 Australian film, Don's Party. It features band members and several Australia actors (Ben Mendelsohn, Matt Day, Stephen Curry, Tania Lacy, and Nadine Garner) re-enacting scenes from the film, along with characters interacting with the band performing in a garden.

== Charts ==
Chart performance for "What I Don't Know 'bout You"
Chart (1998)	Peak position
Australia (ARIA)	28
