= Dress Me Slowly =

Studio album by You Am I
- Released: April 2001
- Recorded: Q Studios - Sydney
- Genre: Alternative rock
- Label: BMG Australia
- Producer: Clif Norrell

You Am I chronology
...Saturday Night, 'Round Ten (1999)	Dress Me Slowly (2001)	Deliverance (2002)

Professional ratings
Review scores
Source	Rating
Allmusic	4/5 stars

Dress Me Slowly is the fifth studio album by the Australian rock band, You Am I. It was released in April, 2001, by BMG Australia. The album was produced, recorded and mixed by Clif Norrell at Q Studios in Sydney, except for "Beautiful Girl", "Watcha Doin' To Me" and "Kick a Hole in the Sky" which were recorded by Paul McKercher at Sing Sing Studios in Melbourne and mixed by Skip Saylor Studios in Los Angeles. It was the first studio album to feature lead guitarist Davey Lane.

The album debuted at #3 on the ARIA charts, breaking their run of #1 debuts since Hi Fi Way. A small vintage clothes store in Fitzroy, Melbourne, has paid tribute to the album by naming the store "Dress Me Slowly".

== Recording ==
"Beautiful Girl", "Watcha Doin' To Me" and "Kick a Hole in the Sky" were all recorded around 6 months after the album was nominally finished, because the band had written them in the interim and simply wanted to include them in the final package.

Having signed with an American label, the band was asked to record demos for the first time, and linked with new producers. Tim Rogers said, "I hated the American guys and the English guys who were asking us to modernise our sound. We're just so unsuited to that. I've got the voice of a 12-year-old girl and the mind of a 70-year-old dero. But I love that record. The actual recording of it with Clif was an absolute joy."

== Reception ==
Trouser Press said that with the addition of Lane "the sound is more muscular, with clear signs that someone in the band has been listening to early-'70s Rolling Stones. "Get Up" and "End o' the Line" are among the hardest tracks the band had committed to disc up to this point. As a whole, the album is tasty and satisfying, but not especially divine."

== Track listing ==
All songs written by Tim Rogers.

1. "Judge Roy"
2. "Get Up"
3. "Beautiful Girl"
4. "Damage"
5. "Doug Sahm"
6. "Watcha Doin' To Me"
7. "Satisfied Mind"
8. "Bring Some Sun Back"
9. "Weeds"
10. "Gone, Gone, Gone"
11. "Sugar"
12. "Kick a Hole in the Sky"
13. "End O' The Line"

== The Temperance Union EP ==
Limited copies of the album in digipack packaging included a bonus CD of eight songs called The Temperance Union EP, consisting of solo songs written and performed by Tim Rogers. He later formed a backing band for his solo albums named The Temperance Union.

1. "Makin' Toast"
2. "The Smokin' Popes"
3. "Faith"
4. "Paragon Cafe"
5. "The Loneliest Folk in the World"
6. "Dreamin'"
7. "The Man You Want Me To Be"
8. "Get Drunk, Ring Yer Friends"

The words for "Dreamin'" were put to new music and reappeared as "I Only Understand Her in the Rain" on Spit Polish.

== Personnel ==
=== You Am I ===
- Tim Rogers - vocals, guitar
- Andy Kent - bass guitar
- Russell Hopkins - drums, percussion
- Davey Lane - guitar

=== Additional musicians ===
- Adrian Keating - Violin 1
- Michelle Kelly - Violin 2
- Deborah Lander - Viola
- Kate Morgan - Cello
- James Greening - horns
- Carolyn Johns - horns
- Anthony Kable - horns
- Phil Slater - horns

== Charts ==
Chart (2001)	Peak position
Australian Albums (ARIA)	3
