= Goddamn (EP) =

EP by You Am I
- Released: May 1992
- Recorded: September 1991
- Studio: Rich Studios in Sydney
- Genre: Grunge
- Length: 35:16
- Label: Timberyard Records
- Producer: Tom Kazas with Peter Ring

You Am I chronology
Snake Tide (EP) (1991)	Goddamn (1992)	Can't Get Started (EP) (1992)

Goddamn is the second EP released by You Am I in May 1992. The EP was You Am I's first release with bassist Andy Kent who was previously a mixer for the band. It was You Am I's last release on Timberyard Records as they were then signed to Ra Records, a sub-branch of rooArt Records.

== Track listing ==
All songs: Rogers/You Am I

1. "High Chair"
2. "Burn To Stay"
3. "Shame"
4. "Crazy You Is"
5. "White And Skinny"
6. "Drink It Dry"*
7. "New Face"*
8. "Conscience"*
9. "Snake Tide"*

Tracks 6–9 were previously available on You Am I's Snake Tide EP which was first released on vinyl in 1991. On these tracks, Nik Tischler plays bass guitar.

== Personnel ==
- Tim Rogers – vocals, guitar
- Andy Kent – bass, backing vocals
- Mark Tunaley – drums
- Nik Tischler – bass on all songs marked *

== Charts ==
Chart performance for Goddamn
Chart (1992)	Peak position
Australian Albums (ARIA)	150
