= Tuesday (You Am I song) =

Single by You Am I

from the album Hourly, Daily
- Released: February 1997
- Studio: Q Studios, Sydney
- Genre: Alternative rock
- Length: 3:15
- Label: rooArt
- Songwriter: Tim Rogers
- Producer: You Am I

You Am I singles chronology
"Good Mornin'" (1996)	"Tuesday" (1997)	"What I Don't Know 'bout You" (1998)

"Tuesday" is the fourth single from the album Hourly, Daily by Australian rock band You Am I. It was released in 1997 and reached number 29 on the Australian charts.

== Track listing ==
1. "Tuesday" – 3:15
2. "Circles" – 2:41
3. "When You Got Dry" – 3:22
4. "Tonight I'll Be Staying Here With You" (live) – 3:02

"Circles" is a cover of the Who song.

"When You Got Dry" was originally released on the very limited "When You Got Dry/How Much Is Enough" 7".

"Tonight I'll Be Staying Here With You" is a cover of the Bob Dylan song and is a live, acoustic performance from The Metro Theatre in Sydney.

== Charts ==
Chart performance for "Tuesday"
Chart (1997)	Peak position
Australia (ARIA)	29
