= No. 4 Record =

#4 Record

Studio album by You Am I
- Released: 28 April 1998
- Recorded: Late 1997
- Studio: Sound City, Los Angeles
- Length: 37:36
- Label: rooArt

You Am I chronology
Hourly, Daily (1996)	#4 Record (1998)	...Saturday Night, 'Round Ten (1999)

#4 Record or You Am I's #4 Album is the fourth studio album by Australian rock band, You Am I, which was released in April 1998. It reached No. 1 on the ARIA albums chart (and No. 111 on the US College Chart). It was the group's third consecutive album to debut at No. 1, a then-record by an Australian band. Its third single "Heavy Heart", is one of their well known songs and has been covered by different artists including Paul Kelly, Ben Lee, Lisa Mitchell, TZU, Courtney Barnett, and the Supersuckers.

You Am I recorded #4 Record with producer George Drakoulias. His work schedule was described by front man, vocalist and guitarist, Tim Rogers, they were put "through the wringer", with high standards for the scansion of the vocal performance, which he wanted to capture on the recordings. The album was recorded during an unhappy period for the band. "It was the worst recording experience. Rusty, Andy and I didn't hang out." Rogers later said.

== Background ==
Work for #4 Record, You Am I's fourth studio album, began late in 1997 with George Drakoulias (the Black Crowes, the Jayhawks) producing at his Sound City Studios in Los Angeles, again. The line-up of the band was Rusty Hopkinson on drums and percussion, Andy Kent on bass guitar and Tim Rogers on lead vocals and guitar. Drakoulias had previously recorded the group in 1996. The limited-edition version, issued in May 1998, included a bonus disc of nine tracks, Radio Settee, which was recorded for youth radio station Triple J's programme Live at the Wireless.

== Reception ==
Professional ratings
Review scores
Source	Rating
AllMusic	4/5 stars

Australian musicologist, Ian McFarlane believes it is "lean, nifty rock'n'roll"; while music journalist, Ed Nimmervoll observed it was a "back-to-basics" album. Rolling Stone Australia's writer claimed the album, "strikes perhaps the group's best balance between pure pop and jagged, potent riffola: even if the American producer did his best to sand the rough edges off 'Billy' and the great rock & roll radio pop of 'Rumble'."

AllMusic's Jack Rabid said the band, "finally makes some headway toward matching its vicious, chaotic live intensity. You have an LP that beguiles, teases, sweetens, and often throbs in popcraft. It also blasts in fits and starts of harsh edge, chops, infectious attitude, and, when it suits them, abandon." Andrew Bartlett of Woroni felt, "As well as being fine listening, there's some lyrical usage worth noting on this disc." Trouser Press agreed "The disc is a much more straightforward collection of would-be radio hits, featuring some of Rogers' best lyrics."

Ranked as 19th most under-rated album of all time, FasterLouder said, "For a band that always styled itself on the sloppy swagger of the Stones, the clever wordplay of the Kinks and the brazen cheek of the Faces, #4's about as close as they got to an amalgam of that holy trinity."

== Track listing ==
All tracks by Tim Rogers.

1. "Junk" – 2:39
2. "The Cream & the Crock" – 3:20
3. "What I Don't Know 'bout You" – 3:10
4. "Fifteen" – 3:05
5. "Top of the Morn' & Slip of the Day" – 3:40
6. "Billy" – 2:13
7. "Come Home Wit' Me" – 3:11
8. "Heavy Heart" – 3:11
9. "Rumble" – 2:36
10. "Guys, Girls, Guitars" – 2:58
11. "Plans" – 3:53
12. "...And Vandalism" – 3:40

=== Radio Settee ===
The limited edition of the album came with a live bonus disc, featuring songs recorded for a Triple J's programme Live at the Wireless set. Several tracks have Brad Shepherd of The Hoodoo Gurus on extra guitar and harmonica, while Phil Stack contributes double bass to tracks 3 and 4.

1. "Live with Me"
2. "Looking for a Kiss"
3. "Berlin Chair" (acoustic)
4. "Heavy Heart" (acoustic)
5. "Junk"
6. "Billy"
7. "Trike"
8. "Fox on the Run"
9. "Mr Milk"

The EP has three cover versions: "Live with Me" is a cover of the Rolling Stones song; "Looking for a Kiss" is a cover of a New York Dolls; and "Fox on the Run" is a cover of Sweet.

== Charts ==
Chart (1998)	Peak Position
Australian Albums (ARIA)	1
US College Top 200 (CMJ)	111

== Certifications ==
Region	Certification	Certified units/sales
Australia (ARIA)	Gold	35,000^{^}
^{^} Shipments figures based on certification alone.
