= Deliverance (You Am I song) =

Single by You Am I

from the album Deliverance
- Released: March 2003
- Recorded: Sing Sing Studios, Melbourne
- Genre: Alternative rock
- Length: 4:08
- Label: BMG Australia
- Songwriter(s): Tim Rogers
- Producer(s): You Am I

You Am I singles chronology
"Who Put the Devil in You" (2002)	"Deliverance" (2003)	"It Ain't Funny How We Don't Talk Anymore" (2006)

"Deliverance" is the second single from the album Deliverance by Australian rock band You Am I. It was released in 2003.

== Reception ==
Junkee said, "In case it wasn’t clear by the Keith Richards guitar chops and the persistent cowbell, the title track to 2002's Deliverance is You Am I's love letter to the Rolling Stones. It’s a capital-R rock song, boasting a stomping groove and bluesy chords churning against a steady bassline and Rogers’ none-too-subtle Jaggerisms."

== Track listing ==
1. "Deliverance" – 4:08
2. "Ribbons and Bows (radio edit)" - 3:32
3. "You Got Lucky" - 4:03
4. "Deliverance (To Evil)" - 4:41

"Ribbons and Bows", "You Got Lucky" and "Deliverance (To Evil)" are all You Am I originals. "Ribbons and Bows" is also from Deliverance (the radio edit removes the crossfade from the previous album track during the intro), while "You Got Lucky" was released in an unmastered form on the Who Put the Devil in You single. "Deliverance (To Evil)" is the full version of the rambunctious acoustic demo version of the title track, a snippet of which can be heard on the album.

== Charts ==
Chart performance for "Deliverance"
Chart (2003)	Peak position
Australia (ARIA)	119
