= Kick a Hole in the Sky =

Single by You Am I

from the album Dress Me Slowly
- Released: July 2001
- Studio: Sing Sing Studios, Melbourne
- Genre: Alternative rock
- Length: 3:54
- Label: BMG Australia
- Songwriter(s): Tim Rogers.
- Producer(s): Clif Norrell

You Am I singles chronology
| "Get Up" (2001) | "Kick a Hole in the Sky" (2001) | "Who Put the Devil in You" (2002) |

"Kick a Hole in the Sky" is the third and final single from the album Dress Me Slowly by Australian rock band You Am I. It was released in 2001 and reached number 56 in that year's Hottest 100.

== Reception ==
David James Young of Junkee wrote, "With Davey Lane officially on board, the best-known line-up of the band was officially cemented with the release of Dress Me Slowly. "Hole in the Sky" cements Lane as a perfect sideman to Rogers’ energy, with all respect to Andy Kent — his harmonies in the chorus send it from good to great, while his solo later in the piece is an absolute ripper."

== Track listing ==
1. "Kick a Hole in the Sky" – 3:54
2. "Midget in a Nightclub" – 3:42
3. "Sweet Alcohol" – 4:44
4. "White and Lazy" – 2:21

"Midget in a Nightclub" and "Sweet Alcohol" are You Am I originals written by Tim Rogers.

"White and Lazy" is a cover of the Replacements song and was previously released on an all-Australian Replacements tribute album, I'm in Love... With That Song.

== Charts ==
Chart performance for "Kick a Hole in the Sky"
| Chart (2001) | Peak position |
|---|---|
| Australia (ARIA) | 77 |
