= Jewels and Bullets =

Single by You Am I

from the album Hi Fi Way
- Released: April 1995
- Studio: Greene St. Recording, New York City
- Genre: Alternative rock
- Length: 2:58
- Label: rooArt
- Songwriter(s): Rusty Hopkinson, Andy Kent, Tim Rogers
- Producer(s): Lee Ranaldo

You Am I singles chronology
"Cathy's Clown" (1995)	"Jewels and Bullets" (1995)	"Purple Sneakers" (1995)

"Jewels and Bullets" is the second single from the album Hi Fi Way by the Australian rock band You Am I. It was released in 1995 and reached number 93 on the Australian ARIA singles chart, and number 93 in the 1995 Triple J Hottest 100.

The Robbie Douglas-Turner directed music video won the ARIA Award for Best Video at the ARIA Music Awards of 1995.

== Track listing ==
1. "Jewels and Bullets" – 2:58
2. "Jaimme's Got a Gal" (Remix) – 3:30
3. "Young Man Blues" (live) – 5:01

Tracks 1 and 2 (Rogers). Track 3 (Allison).

The "Jaimme's Got a Gal" remix features strings and additional guitar and percussion.

"Young Man Blues" is a cover version of the Mose Allison song brought to prominence by The Who. It was recorded live at Memorial Stadium in Seattle on August 13, 1994, while supporting Soundgarden on a national tour.

== Charts ==
Chart performance for "Jewels and Bullets"
Chart (1995)	Peak position
Australia (ARIA)	93
