= Convicts (You Am I album) =

Studio album by You Am I
- Released: 13 May 2006
- Recorded: 2005
- Genre: Rock
- Length: 36:12
- Label: Virgin
- Producer: Greg Wales

You Am I chronology
The Cream & the Crock – The Best of You Am I (2003)	Convicts (2006)	Dilettantes (2008)

Professional ratings
Review scores
Source	Rating
AllMusic	3.5/5 stars
Slant Magazine	2.5/5 stars
fasterlouder.com.au	(favourable)
SMH	(favourable)

Convicts is the seventh studio album by the Australian rock band You Am I.

The first single is "It Ain't Funny How We Don’t Talk Anymore", which was released as a digital download on 22 April 2006.

Tim Rogers later said of the album, "It hadn't been a great couple of years, and it's even worse when I look back at it now. I had no confidence at all so I wanted the guitars too loud and everything aggressive and loose."

== Reception ==
AllMusic described the album as, "sharp and succinct collection that continues the band's snappy punk-pop attack. Despite the group's illustrious history, this is old-fashioned, scrappy garage rock with enough snotty punk influences to attract the hardcore faithful and plenty of melody to possibly coax some radio play from stations that added Green Day to their play lists." Australian Guitar said it was, "a chewy knuckle of an album, straight out of the bar rooms and into your ears."

Bernard Zuel claimed, "the best and certainly most important Australian rock band of the past 15 years is pumping with more foot to the floor, garage rock than they've shown since the now classic mid-'90s pair of Hi Fi Way and Hourly Daily.

== Track listing ==
1. "Thank God I've Hit the Bottom"
2. "It Ain't Funny How We Don't Talk Anymore"
3. "Friends Like You"
4. "Nervous Kid"
5. "Secrets"
6. "Thuggery"
7. "By My Own Hand"
8. "The Sweet Life"
9. "Gunslingers"
10. "Constance George"
11. "Explaining Cricket"
12. "I'm a Mess"
13. "Left Behind" (Bonus track on iTunes release)

== Charts ==
Chart (2005)	Peak position
Australian Albums (ARIA)	11
