= Good Mornin' =

Single by You Am I

from the album Hourly, Daily
- Released: September 1996
- Studio: Q Studios, Sydney
- Genre: Alternative rock
- Length: 4:12
- Label: Ra
- Songwriter(s): Tim Rogers
- Producer(s): You Am I

You Am I singles chronology
"You Am I" (1996)	"Good Mornin'" (1996)	"Tuesday" (1997)

"Good Mornin'" is the third single from the album Hourly, Daily by Australian rock band You Am I. It was released in 1996 and reached number 84 in the 1996 Triple J Hottest 100 and number 44 on the Australian charts.

Tim Rogers said the song was one of two songs that, "Russ hadn't actually heard before we recorded them. I was talking him through it as we were recording and I think he only played it twice and that's the final take."

Rogers said the song was inspired by AM radio stations that he would listen to in the morning while writing the album Hourly, Daily. "Often I wake up depressed, as people do, and I found it really comforting. I could see how you could get attached to it, instead of waking up with someone next to you."

The Mark Hartley directed music video was nominated for the ARIA Award for Best Video at the ARIA Music Awards of 1997.

== Track listing ==
=== CD single ===
1. "Good Mornin'" – 4:12
2. "I'll Make You Happy" – 3:29
3. "(You Must Fight to Live) On the Planet of the Apes" – 2:59

"I'll Make You Happy" is a cover of the Easybeats song.

"(You Must Fight to Live) On the Planet of the Apes" is a cover of the Mummies song and features Rusty Hopkinson on lead vocals.

=== Cassingle ===
1. "Good Mornin'" – 4:12
2. "Soldiers" (live)
3. "Mr. Milk" (live)
4. "Cathy's Clown" (live)

"Soldiers", "Mr. Milk" and "Cathy's Clown" were recorded at Peter Gaudion's Jazz Lane on 13 June 1996 and were first broadcast on Triple R's live music feature Caught in the Act on 2 July 1996.

== Charts ==
Chart performance for "Good Mornin'"
Chart (1996)	Peak position
Australia (ARIA)	44
