= Adam's Ribs (song) =

Single by You Am I

from the album Sound as Ever
- Released: October 1993
- Recorded: Cannon Falls, Minnesota
- Genre: Alternative rock
- Length: 3:55
- Label: rooArt Records
- Songwriters: Andy Kent, Tim Rogers, Mark Tunaley
- Producer: Lee Ranaldo

You Am I singles chronology
"Adam's Ribs" (1993)	"Berlin Chair" (1994)

"Adam's Ribs" is the debut single by Australian rock band You Am I, from the album Sound as Ever. It was released in 1993 and reached #50 in that year's Hottest 100.

== Reception ==
Junkee Media said, "'Adam's Ribs' channels the bands heavier and grungier influences through a power-pop streamline. The main riff could just as easily belong to the Who as it could to Nirvana, and that’s entirely a compliment."

== Track listing ==
1. "Adam's Ribs" – 3:55
2. "Spit" - 1:21
3. "Alembic" - 4:06

== Charts ==
Chart performance for "Adam's Ribs"
Chart (1993)	Peak position
Australia (ARIA)	150
