= Coprolalia (EP) =

EP by You Am I
- Released: April 1993
- Recorded: January 1993
- Studio: Megaphon Studios, Sydney
- Genre: Alternative, Grunge
- Label: rooArt Records
- Producer: Lee Ranaldo

You Am I chronology
Can't Get Started (EP) (1992)	Coprolalia (1993)	Sound As Ever (1993)

Coprolalia is the fourth EP released by You Am I, in April 1993. The recording and mixing took place at Megaphon Studios in Sydney, produced by Lee Ranaldo. A film clip was made for "Last Thing You Can Depend On"

== Track listing ==
All songs: Rogers/You Am I

1. "Cool Hand Luke" – 3:43
2. "Last Thing You Can Depend On" – 4:51
3. "Can't Get Started" – 3:17
4. "In Case You're Wandering" – 3:25
5. "Embarrassed" – 3:33

== Personnel ==
- Tim Rogers – vocals, guitar
- Andy Kent – bass, backing vocals
- Mark Tunaley – drums

== Charts ==
Chart performance for Coprolalia
Chart (1993)	Peak position
Australia (ARIA)	117
