= Heavy Heart (song) =

Single by You Am I

from the album #4 Record
- Released: July 1998
- Genre: Alternative rock
- Length: 3:11
- Label: rooArt
- Songwriter: Tim Rogers
- Producer: George Drakoulias

You Am I singles chronology
"Rumble" (1998)	"Heavy Heart" (1998)	"Damage" (2000)

"Heavy Heart" is the third single from the album #4 Record by Australian rock band You Am I. It was released in 1998 and reached number 49 on the Australian national charts and number 9 in that year's Hottest 100.

Tim Rogers said of the song, "I played "Heavy Heart" for the first time, and Emmylou Harris was in the front row, and people were like, 'What the fuck is that song.' So I thought, 'Hmmm, maybe I'm on to something here.' I wrote that song for Charlie Rich who passed away around that time, unfortunately."

== Reception ==
Trouser Press said, "The lonely ballad "Heavy Heart" bulges with crystalline metaphors: 'I'm like a waterlogged ball that no one wants to kick 'round anymore'"

== Track listing ==
1. "Heavy Heart" – 3:11
2. "What I Don't Know 'bout You" (live) – 3:18
3. "Midnight to Six Man" – 2:40
4. "She's So Fine" – 2:30

"What I Don't Know 'bout You" (live) was taken from the Triple J Live at the Wireless performance that features on the #4 Record bonus disc 'Radio Sette'.

"Midnight to Six Man" is a cover of the Pretty Things song.

"She's So Fine" is an Easybeats cover.

== Cover versions ==
As one of You Am I's most popular songs, "Heavy Heart" has been covered several times, most notably by TZU for Triple J's Like a Version, as well as other artists like Paul Kelly, Ben Lee and Supersuckers. Tex Perkins performed the song with the band on their 'You Am I & Friends' Live at the Wireless session which was released on the Convicts bonus disc 'The Convict Stain'. Australian indie rock singer-songwriter Courtney Barnett covered the song in her Austin City Limits performance that aired 31 October 2015, stating it was her favourite song.

== Charts ==
Chart performance for "Heavy Heart"
Chart (1998)	Peak position
Australia (ARIA)	49
