= Sound as Ever =

Studio album by You Am I
- Released: 25 October 1993
- Recorded: 27 July – 3 August 1993
- Studios: Pachyderm, Cannon Falls, Minnesota
- Genres: Alternative rock; grunge
- Length: 49:41
- Labels: rooArt; Warner
- Producer: Lee Ranaldo

You Am I chronology
| Coprolalia (1993) | Sound as Ever (1993) | Hi Fi Way (1995) |

Singles from Sound as Ever
- 1. "Adam's Ribs" Released: 11 October 1993; 2. "Berlin Chair" Released: 24 January 1994; 3. "Jaimme's Got a Gal" Released: 16 May 1994

Sound as Ever is the debut album by Australian band You Am I, released in October 1993 via rooArt Records. It was recorded at Pachyderm Studio in rural Cannon Falls, Minnesota, over eight days from July to August 1993 and was produced by Lee Ranaldo, (Sonic Youth) with Wayne Connolly as mixer and audio engineer. It provided three singles, "Adam's Ribs" (October 1993), "Berlin Chair" (February 1994) and "Jaimme's Got a Gal" (May).

Sound as Ever was a departure for Tim Rogers on lead vocals, lead guitar and organ; Andy Kent on bass guitar and backing vocals; and Mark Tunaley on drums, percussion and vocals. They are a back to basics, punk-influenced Australian rock band. Rogers described recording the album, "Lee was the sweetest man in the world and continues to be so. Nirvana had just packed up after In Utero and we were the next ones in, this bunch of little yokels from Australia." Before the album appeared Tunaley was "ousted from the band"; he was eventually replaced by Rusty Hopkinson on drums.

== Reception ==
Professional ratings
Review scores
| Source | Rating |
|---|---|
| AllMusic | 4/5 stars |

== Track listing ==
The Australian track listing is as follows:

All songs: Rogers/You Am I (except where noted)

1. "Coprolalia"
2. "Berlin Chair"
3. "Trainspottin'"
4. "Adam's Ribs"
5. "Rosedale"
6. "Forever and Easy"
7. "Everyone's to Blame"
8. "Jaimme's Got a Gal"
9. "Who's Leaving You Now?" (Kent, Rogers, You Am I)
10. "Ordinary"
11. "You Scare Me"
12. "Off the Field" (Tunaley, You Am I)
13. "Sound As Ever"

When the album was released in America, "Off the Field" was omitted; while "Coprolalia", "Berlin Chair", "Trainspottin'" and "Jaimme's Got a Gal" were remixed by David Bianco.

== 2013 reissue ==
In 2013, You Am I reissued a remastered version of Sound as Ever, with a bonus disc featuring B-sides, out-takes and live recordings. The band also released the album on vinyl for the first time.

This 2013 reissue coincided with reissues for You Am I's subsequent albums Hi Fi Way and Hourly, Daily, which was accompanied by an Australian tour titled the Hi Fi Daily Double Tour.

== Personnel ==
- Tim Rogers – vocals, guitar, organ
- Andy Kent – bass guitar, backing vocals
- Mark Tunaley – drums, percussion
- Lee Ranaldo – producer, mixer; additional vocals, guitar and keyboard
- Wayne Connolly – mixer, audio engineer

== Charts ==
Chart performance for Sound as Ever
| Chart (1994–2013) | Peak position |
|---|---|
| Australian Albums (ARIA) | 56 |

== Release history ==
| Region | Date | Label | Format | Catalog | Ref. |
|---|---|---|---|---|---|
| Australia | 25 October 1993 | Ra Records, Warner Music Australasia | CD | 4509939582 | |
| Australia | 25 October 1993 | Ra Records, Warner Music Australasia | Cassette | 4509939584 | |
| United States | 14 February 1995 | Ra Records, Restless Records | CD | 7 72795-2 | |
| United States | 27 June 1995 | Ra Records, Restless Records, Warner Bros. Records | CD | 9 45936-2 | |
| Australia | 11 November 1996 | Ra Records, BMG | CD | 74321439652 | |
| Australia | 21 June 2013 | Sony Music | CD | 88883733962 | |
| Australia | 21 June 2013 | Sony Music | Digital download | G010002997711Y | |
| Australia | 6 August 2013 | YAI Records | LP | YAI002 | |
