= Mr. Milk =

"Mr Milk"

Single by You Am I

from the album Hourly, Daily
- Released: November 1995
- Studio: Paradise Studio
- Genre: Alternative rock
- Length: 3:19
- Label: Ra
- Songwriter(s): Rusty Hopkinson; Andy Kent; Tim Rogers

You Am I singles chronology
"Purple Sneakers" (1995)	"Mr Milk" (1995)	"Soldiers" (1996)

"Mr. Milk" is the first single from the album Hourly, Daily by Australian rock band, You Am I. It was released in 1995 and reached number 50 on the ARIA Singles Chart.

== Track listing ==
1. "Mr. Milk" – 3:19
2. "My Friend Jack" – 2:50
3. "Embarrassed (Live) – 3:10

The single version of "Mr. Milk" differs from that on Hourly, Daily, which was re-recorded for the album. "My Friend Jack" is a cover version of the original by the Smoke. "Embarrassed" was taken from the 1995 Triple J Live at the Wireless performance, and originally appeared on the Coprolalia extended play.

European versions of the single have "Six" – 2:52, "Handwasher" – 2:29 and "Young Man Blues" (live) – 5:00 as the additional tracks.

== Charts ==
Chart performance for "Mr. Milk"
Chart (1995)	Peak position
Australia (ARIA)	50
