= You Am I =

Australian power pop band

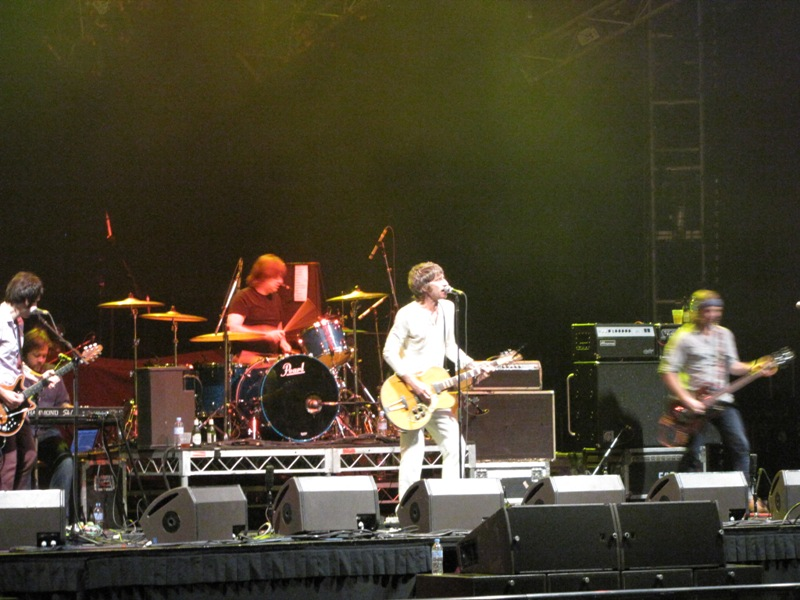
- From left to right: Davey Lane, Rusty Hopkinson, Tim Rogers, Andy Kent at AIS Arena, Canberra in November 2011

Background information
- Origin: Sydney, New South Wales, Australia
- Genres: Alternative rock; power pop
- Years active: 1989–present
- Labels: Timberyard; rooArt; Warner; BMG; Virgin; Restless
- Members: Tim Rogers; Davey Lane; Andy Kent; Rusty Hopkinson
- Past members: Jaimme Rogers; Nick Tischler; Mark Tunaley; Greg Hitchcock
- Website: www.youami.com.au

You Am I are an Australian power pop band, fronted by its songwriter and guitarist, Tim Rogers. They formed in December 1989 and are the first Australian band to have released three successive albums that have each debuted at the number-one position on the ARIA Albums Chart: Hi Fi Way (February 1995), Hourly, Daily (July 1996) and #4 Record (April 1998). Nine of their tracks appeared on the related ARIA Singles Chart top 50 with "What I Don't Know 'bout You" (February 1998), their highest charting, at No. 28. You Am I have received ten ARIA Music Awards from thirty-one nominations. The band have supported international artists such as the Who, the Rolling Stones, Sonic Youth and Oasis.

You Am I's second studio album, Hi Fi Way, appeared in the eighth position in the book, 100 Best Australian Albums (October 2010). Their third album, Hourly, Daily was listed at number fifty five. The same two releases were also voted into the "Hottest 100 Australian Albums of All Time" list compiled by Australian youth radio station, Triple J, in 2011. Fourteen of their songs have been placed on the related annual Hottest 100 lists with "Heavy Heart" (July 1998), the highest at No. 9.

In November 2025, the group will be inducted into the ARIA Hall of Fame.

== History ==
=== 1989–1992: Formation and early years ===
You Am I were formed in Sydney in December 1989 by Tim Rogers (ex- Pleasureheads, Glazed Expression) on vocals, guitar, mellotron and Hammond organ; his older brother Jaimme Rogers on drums; and Nick Tischler on bass guitar. Tim Rogers and Tischler were old school mates. After forming, the band members began by trying to cover songs by the Hard-Ons, X, and Aerosmith.

At an early gig, a fan provided "a big spiritual spiel about '.... I am you... you am i...'". The band took that as the inspiration for the working title" for the group's name. This initial line-up was short-lived, Jaimme left before the end of the following year after a "fight" with Tim, and he was replaced by Mark Tunaley on drums. In the band's 1993 song, "Jaimme's Got a Gal", Tim explained why his brother left.

You Am I signed with an independent label, Timberyard Records, and in May 1991 issued a six-track extended play, Snake Tide. It was recorded in February at Electric Avenue Studios with Phil Punch as engineer, mixer and co-producer with the group. Australian musicologist, Ian McFarlane, described the EP as "rough hewn". You Am I appeared at the inaugural Big Day Out concert, held in Sydney in January 1992.

By April 1992, Tischler had left the band "because he didn't think he could fulfill Tim's vision". He was replaced by their previous live sound mixer, Andy Kent (ex-Pupils of Love), on bass guitar. In May they released a five-track EP, Goddamn, which was produced by Tom Kazas. An alternative nine-track version of Goddamn, which was expanded by adding four tracks from Snake Tide, was also issued. McFarlane declared that "By that stage, Rogers had established his credentials as a fine songwriter and the band a reputation as an exciting, dynamic live act."

By mid-1992, they had signed with another independent label, rooArt Records, on their subsidiary rA Records, which was distributed by WEA. The group released their third EP, Can't Get Started, as a five-track set in October 1992, which was co-produced by the band with David Price. Before the end of the year You Am I supported Hoodoo Gurus on a national tour.

=== 1993–1994: Debut album: Sound as Ever ===
Late in 1992, Tim Rogers sent samples of You Am I's releases to Lee Ranaldo of American rock group, Sonic Youth. In January 1993 both groups appeared at the second Big Day Out festival in Sydney, Melbourne, Adelaide and Perth. While in Sydney, Ranaldo co-produced You Am I's five-track EP, Coprolalia, which was issued in April. McFarlane opined that it was "bursting with kinetic energy and first-rate songs." You Am I co-headlined a national tour from May to June, with stoner metallers, Tumbleweed.

You Am I travelled to Cannon Falls, Minnesota, United States, using Sonic Youth's Pachyderm Recording Studios. For eight days Ranaldo produced their debut album, Sound as Ever (November 1993), with Wayne Connolly as audio engineer. It appeared on the ARIA Albums Chart top 100. Mark Morgenstein of AllMusic felt the work "shows this power trio in top form, with enthusiastic backing to well-written songs... [if it] was a little more consistent, this would be a classic."

In May 2013, Rogers reminisced, "I lost an incredibly important person to cancer who I still think about every day and that experience pretty much coloured the whole record." He referred to his mentor, Stephen "Goose" Gray of Sydney-based rock group, Box the Jesuit, who had died of lymphoma in August 1993. "[Goose] would have wanted me to stay in America to finish the album so that's what I did. But there's no nostalgia or good feelings about that time."

In October 1993, ahead of the album's release, Tunaley was "fired from the band with a simple phone call." He had "wanted to play heavier music", however Kent and Rogers "wanted to play a more pop based rock". Rogers initially considered disbanding the group but continued with Russell Hopkinson (ex-Nursery Crimes) on drums, percussion and backing vocals. At the ARIA Music Awards of 1994 in March they won the newly created category, Best Alternative Release for Sound as Ever.

Sound as Ever provided three singles, "Adam's Ribs" (October 1993), "Berlin Chair" (February 1994) and "Jaimme's Got a Gal" (May). All three received high rotation on national youth radio station, Triple J; each was listed on the station's annual listeners' poll, Hottest 100: "Adam's Ribs" at No. 50 in January 1994, "Berlin Chair " at No. 23 and "Jaimme's Got a Gal" at No. 77 in January 1995.

=== 1994–1995: Hi Fi Way ===
For seven days during mid-September 1994 You Am I decamped to Greene Street Studios, New York. Again they worked with Ranaldo, as producer, to record their second album, Hi Fi Way which was released on 20 February 1995. Ahead of the album, in November 1994, they issued a limited pressing (449 units) of "When You Got Dry"/"How Much Is Enough" as a double-A sided vinyl single. "Cathy's Clown" was released as a single in early February, which peaked at No. 36 on the ARIA Singles Chart. Hi Fi Way reached the number-one position on the related albums chart. A limited-edition version included a bonus disc, Someone Else's Crowd, which had seven live tracks recorded at their gig at Memorial Stadium, Seattle, United States on 13 August 1994.

McFarlane described the album, which "remains one of the finest Australian albums of the 1990s. Full of audacious, incisive and tuneful rock'n'roll it made its debut at #1 on the mainstream national chart and went on to sell over 35000 copies." Ed Nimmervoll of HowlSpace website felt it was "reflective, lyrically nostalgic"; while AllMusic's Steven McDonald wrote it was "[a] cute outing that throws in thumpy drums, crunchy guitars and delightfully whiny Mellotron string noises along the way." By April 1995 the group had added Greg Hitchcock (ex-The Verys) as an auxiliary member on guitar and keyboards.

At the ARIA Music Awards of 1995 You Am I received their second trophy for Best Alternative Album, for Hi Fi Way. They were also nominated for Album of the Year, Best Group, Best Video ("Jewels and Bullets", directed by Robbie Douglas-Turner) and Best Cover Art (by Simon Anderson). Hi Fi Way is listed at No. 8 in the book, 100 Best Australian Albums (October 2010). The authors described it as "a textured, immediate pop record that delves through layers of memories, looking back to consider the past even as it makes sober judgements for the future." In July 2013 it re-entered the top 50 for a week.

=== 1996–1997: Hourly, Daily ===
You Am I's third album, Hourly, Daily was released in July 1996, was produced by the group and recorded at Q Sound Studios, Sydney in December 1995. They were assisted by engineers, Connolly and Paul McKercher, which appeared on Ra/rooArt and was distributed by Shock Records. According to Rogers "[it] was my first attempt at a song cycle." McFarlane wrote that it is "another album of urgent, adventurous, unabashed pure pop." Nimmervoll felt it was "a nostalgic journey musically, reflecting Tim Rogers' love of The Sixties. Instead of reflecting his own life, Tim's lyrics looked at the suburban lives of others." Hourly, Daily also debuted at No. 1 on the ARIA Albums Charts, and is the first on the Shock Records label to do so upon launch. A limited edition was issued with a bonus disc of seven live tracks, Beat Party.

For their US and United Kingdom versions of Hourly, Daily on WEA/Warner Bros and rooArt/BMG, in March 1997, two tracks were replaced by newly recorded material, "Trike" and "Opportunities". AllMusic's Jason Anderson opined that Hourly, Daily "did little to ingratiate the group to an America fascinated with the packaging of youth culture... [it is] a conceptual piece that is obsessed with the past but without retro trappings... [Rogers' lyrics] laces together complex ideas with a narrative that transforms the pain of growing up artistic and male in Australia into a weird rock & roll existentialism." The album provided five singles, with the first four reaching the top 50 on the ARIA Singles Chart: "Mr. Milk" (November 1995), "Soldiers" (July 1996), "Good Mornin'" (September), "Tuesday" (February 1997) and "Trike" (July). "Tuesday" peaked at No. 29.

At the ARIA Music Awards of 1996 Hourly, Daily, and the related singles, provided nine nominations, with the group winning six trophies: Album of the Year, Best Group, Best Independent Release, Producer of the Year, Best Video ("Soldiers", directed by Andrew Lancaster) and Engineer of the Year (Paul McKercher and Wayne Connolly). The album was certified platinum by ARIA by the end of 1997 to acknowledge the shipment of 70000 units. It was listed at No. 55 in 100 Best Australian Albums where the authors felt the group were "heavily under the spell of late '60s English music... in particular the Pretty Things' S.F. Sorrow... [which] follows the journey of the character... from birth through love, war, tragedy, madness and old age."

=== 1998–1999: #4 Record ===
Subtle country influences were apparent on You Am I's #4 Record, released in April 1998, such as the track, "Heavy Heart". It was produced by George Drakoulias in Los Angeles, which was their third number-one album in a row – they are the first Australian band to do so. McFarlane believes it is "lean, nifty rock'n'roll"; Nimmervoll wrote it was a "back-to-basics" album. The limited-edition version included a bonus disc of nine tracks, Radio Settee. By that time the rooArt label had been acquired by BMG.

The album provided three singles, "What I Don't Know 'bout You" (February 1998), "Rumble" (April) and "Heavy Heart" (July). "What I Don't Know 'bout You" is their highest-charting single, which peaked at No. 28; whereas "Heavy Heart" is their highest placed track on any annual Triple J Hottest 100, which was listed at No. 9, in January 1999.

By July 1999, the line-up of the group was augmented by Davey Lane of The Pictures on second guitar. Lane came to the band's attention via his work with The Pictures and by accurately transcribing You Am I's guitar tabs from #4 Record on an early fan site. Lane said – on The Cream & the Crock (November 2003) video documentary – that he almost decided not to be a part of the band, as he was "fucking up his favourite band by playing in it" after he had played his first show with them and stuffed up his solos.

Jack Rabid of AllMusic described #4 Record, which "beguiles, teases, sweetens, and often throbs in popcraft. It also blasts in fits and starts of harsh edge, chops, infectious attitude, and, when it suits them, abandon." Sarah Zupko of PopMatters website felt it "keeps the power in power pop" and compared their sound with "early Who, early Jam, Sloan and a touch of the Rolling Stones, but with horns."

You Am I recorded their first live album, ...Saturday Night, 'Round Ten, over a three-night series of gigs at Casa del Resaca, a warehouse in Richmond, in July 1999. It was released in September and includes Lane on guitar. McFarlane noticed that they provided "a strong, swaggering live outing that confirmed the band's standing as one of the country's premier rock'n'roll acts." It peaked at No. 7 on the ARIA Albums Chart. The limited-edition version included a five-track CD-ROM.

=== 2000–2001: Dress Me Slowly ===
After three years between studio albums, due to touring and record label interference, You Am I released Dress Me Slowly in April 2001 on BMG. It was Lane's first appearance on a studio album, which was produced by Clif Norrell. According to Nimmervoll the group were "under a lot of pressure to 'write hits' and 'play the game' for the sake of their US breakthrough." The album debuted at No. 3 on the ARIA Albums Chart.

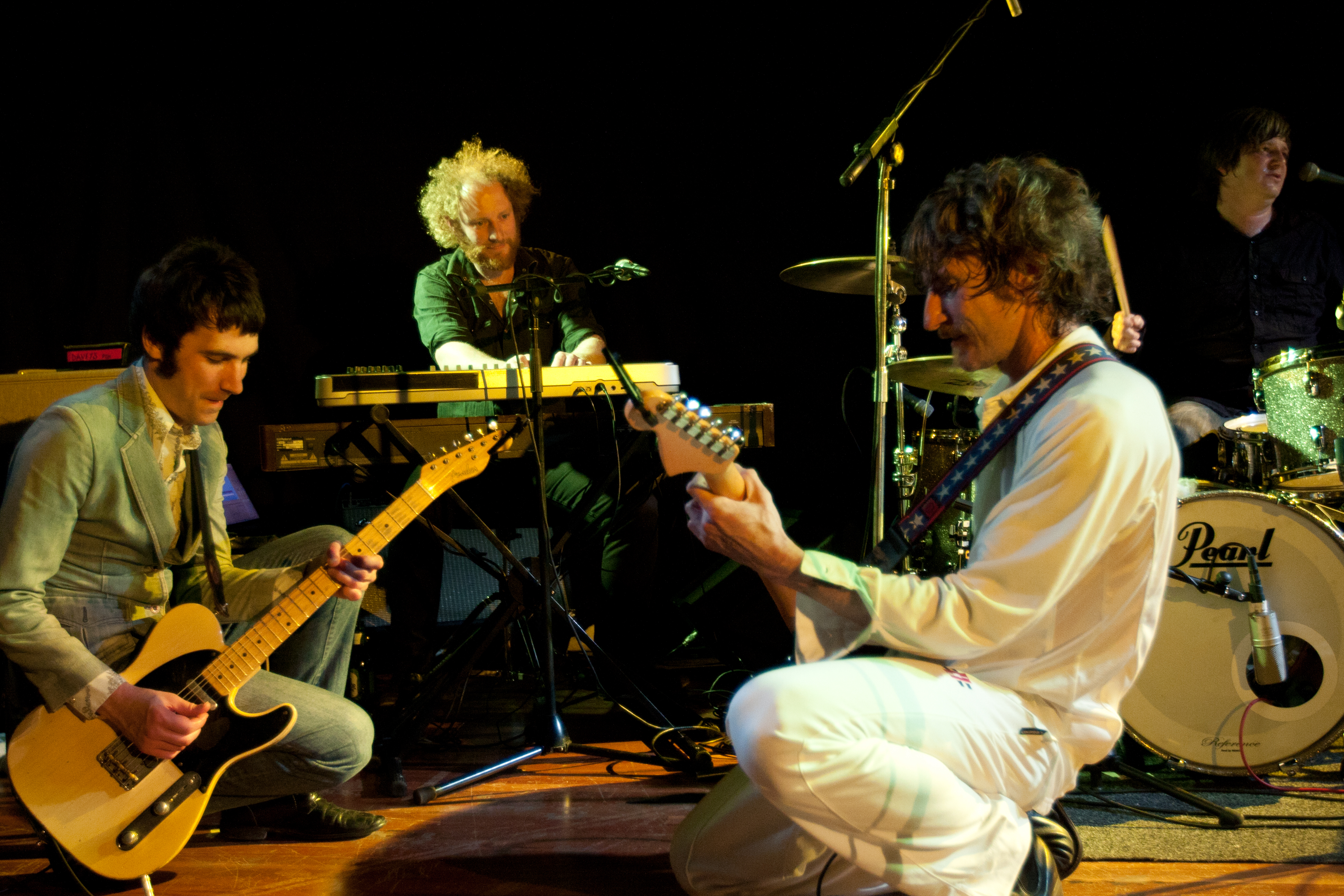
Live in 2011

Anderson felt it was "[s]ubtly toned down, yet still spunky with its clever lyrics and pure guitar pop ... [with] slightly more serious material with all the verve and personality fans should expect." Bill Partsch of Trouser Press opined that "the sound is more muscular... the album is tasty and satisfying, but not especially divine." Nimmervoll declared that "[r]ather than compromising You Am I went straight to the heart of what [they] should sound like as far as the band is concerned."

The limited-edition version of Dress Me Slowly included an eight-track disc, The Temperance Union, which were solo recordings by Rogers and studio musicians. Three singles were released from the standard album, "Damage" (October 2000), "Get Up" (March 2001) and "Kick a Hole in the Sky" (July).

=== 2002–2004: Deliverance ===
You Am I's sixth studio album, Deliverance, was recorded in January 2002 and released in September 2002. It did not receive the kind of critical and commercial success that the band's earlier work had enjoyed. It was produced by McKercher and peaked at No. 12 on the ARIA Albums Chart. Nimmervoll explained that the group's problems with BMG were reflected in the album, which "was the aftermath of that painful episode, relaxed, eclectic, self-produced, and stubbornly without anything resembling a 'hit' single." The band released "Who Put the Devil in You" as a download-only internet single in the same month.

In September 2003, You Am I were dropped by record label BMG after "the company refused to support a tour of the US." AllMusic's Hal Horowitz noticed it was "a slight departure from their existing catalog, Deliverance nonetheless delivers the pop-rock goods... The acoustic guitars that propel much of the last half of the disc don't soften the band's sound as much as muss it up, adding a rootsy, more organic texture."

At the Falls Festival held at Marion Bay over New Year's Eve of 2004–05, You Am I were scheduled to play a set. Rogers appeared on stage heavily intoxicated and, when a fight broke out between Rogers and Lane, the group were forced off stage much to the disappointment of festival goers. Rogers also accidentally knocked fellow artist, Missy Higgins, over. Missy Higgins and The Beautiful Girls were re-called onto stage to do a quick impromptu performance to fill the hour set-time.

=== 2005–2007: Convicts ===
In late 2005, You Am I recorded their seventh studio album entitled Convicts with producer Greg Wales. The title is believed to be a tongue in cheek dig of English people referring to Australians as convicts because of their First Fleet origins. It may also refer to the alternative name used by the band to perform secret gigs during the Hi Fi Way–#4 Record era. The album was released on 13 May 2006 on the band's new record label, Virgin. The Convicts album was also released in the USA on Yep Roc Records. The band toured America in the autumn and summer of 2007 to promote the record.

=== 2008–2009: Dilettantes ===
The band's 8th studio album, Dilettantes, was released on 13 September 2008, alongside the radio-only single Erasmus. The album debuted at number one on the ARIA Australian Music charts, and number twelve on the overall chart.

In August 2010, it was announced that they had left EMI to sign with new Sydney label Other Tongues.

=== 2010–2014 :You Am I ===
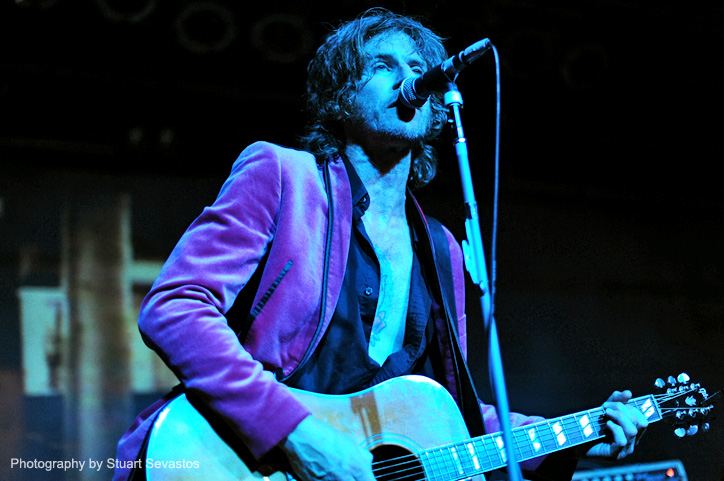
Rogers fronting You Am I, Fly by Night Club, November 2010

The band's ninth self-titled album was released on 8 October 2010. In an interview with music journalist Nick Milligan on 24 September 2010, Rogers said of the ninth You Am I album:

I'm still bewildered by this record. I haven't gotten my head around it. It was extraordinary making it and I don't feel like I've finished the creation of it. I'm still yet to understand it. I like that. I think with previous records I felt I understood what went on and what we were supposed to do. What [each album's] references were. With this [record] I just let myself freefall into it and get lost in the creation of it. I haven't got a grasp on it and I'm enjoying the exhilaration of that. I'm still listening to this record wondering who the person was that wrote that ... and whether I'd like to meet him.

To coincide with the 20th anniversary of the band's debut album, reissues of Sound As Ever, Hi Fi Way and Hourly Daily were released on 7 June 2013. A limited-edition beer brewed by the Sydney brewery Young Henrys was sold in conjunction under the name 'Brew Am I'.

=== 2015–2019: Porridge & Hotsauce ===
You Am I's tenth studio album was released on 6 November 2015. Recorded in Daptone Studios in New York, the album has been described as having 'lashings of Big Star-esque power pop'.

=== 2020–present: The Lives of Others ===
In December 2020, You Am I were listed at number 41 in Rolling Stone Australia's '50 Greatest Australian Artists of All Time' issue.

On 24 February 2021, You am I released "The Waterboy", the lead single from their 11th studio album, The Lives of Others. The album entered the Australian charts at No. 2, marking their first Top 3 album since Dress Me Slowly in 2001.

== Live performances ==
After recording Sound as Ever in August 1993, You Am I had performed "a handful of American showcase gigs." At the Big Day Out festival in January 1994 they performed at the Gold Coast and Auckland shows, alongside Soundgarden. They undertook another Australian tour supporting Hoodoo Gurus and then US visitors, Redd Kross during April. In July and August You Am I supported Soundgarden on a six-week tour of North America. In 1996 You Am I played at the Lollapalooza festival and then supported Lemonheads on a tour of UK and other parts of Western Europe. In March 1997 they toured the US, again supporting Lemonheads. They headlined the Homebake festival's Melbourne concert in January 1998. In the following month they supported Oasis, during the UK group's first-ever Australian tour. Subsequently, they toured Hong Kong and Japan supporting Oasis.

The Strokes supported You Am I during their first tour of Australia, in July 2001. The opening show took place at The Arena in Brisbane, and they also played four shows at the Newtown Theatre in Sydney. On 29 January 2005 the group performed at WaveAid, which was to raise money for the relief effort after hundreds of thousands of people were killed in the 2004 Indian Ocean tidal wave disaster. In July and August 2007 they opened for Smoking Popes on a US tour.

You Am I performed at the Sydney Cricket Ground on 14 March 2009 for Sound Relief, a benefit concert for victims of the Black Saturday Victorian bushfires and the Queensland Floods. They performed at the 2010 NRL Grand Final in October.

The band was the pre-match entertainment for the 2015 SANFL Grand Final played at the Adelaide Oval. For frontman Tim Rogers who grew up in Adelaide and is a supporter of SANFL club Sturt (who did not play in the game) and attended over 600 games as a youngster (including getting his first kiss at one game), it will be his first time performing at the leagues showcase event.

In 2025, You Am I were inducted into the ARIA Hall of Fame, in recognition of their contribution to Australian music. Inducted by Daniel Johns at Sydney’s Hordern Pavilion, the band closed the ceremony with performances of “Heavy Heart” and “Berlin Chair.”

== Side projects ==
In 1999, front man Tim Rogers released his first solo album What Rhymes With Cars And Girls.

In the four years between Deliverance and You Am I's next album, Convicts, both Lane and Rogers kept busy with their own solo projects. Lane performed at the 2004 ARIA Music Awards as part of the supergroup The Wrights, featuring members of many other Australian rock bands, and in 2005 released an LP with The Pictures, Pieces of Eight. Rogers released two albums with The Temperance Union in this period — Spit Polish in 2004 and the Dirty Ron/Ghost Songs double album in 2005.

== Members ==
Current members

- Timothy Rogers – lead vocals, rhythm guitar (1989–present), lead guitar, keyboards (1989–1999)
- Andrew Kent – bass, backing and occasional lead vocals (1992–present)
- Russell Hopkinson – drums, backing and occasional lead vocals (1993–present)
- David Lane – lead guitar, backing and occasional lead vocals, keyboards (1999–present)

Current touring musicians

- James Fleming – keyboards, piano, percussion, backing vocals (2018, 2025–present)

Former members

- Jaimme Rogers – drums (1989–1990)
- Nick Tischler – bass (1989–1992)
- Mark Tunaley – drums (1990–1993)
- Greg Hitchcock – rhythm and lead guitar, keyboards (1996–1998)

Former touring musicians

- Steve Hesketh – keyboards (2011, 2013)
- Judith Hamann – cello (2013)
- Rachel Johnston – cello (2013)
- Phil Noy – saxophone (2013)
- Carl Harvoe – trumpet (2013)
- Eugene Ball – trumpet (2013)

=== Former members ===
Jaimme Rogers and Nick Tischler were in an early incarnation of the band, lasting December 1989 to the end of 1990. This line-up is not known to have recorded any music.

Mark Tunaley was the band's first "official" drummer, and is You Am I's only drummer to date to employ heavy metal style of drumming, which included double bass drum parts. He left the group shortly after the recording of Sound As Ever, due to differing perceptions of the band's direction. His sole songwriting contribution to the band ('Off The Field') was left off the US release of the album.

Greg Hitchcock, formerly of The Verys, was a touring member of the band for the Hourly, Daily era. He played guitar and electric piano with the band for some time up until #4 Record. He was never formally a member of the band, but appeared in the video clips for 'Soldiers', 'Good Mornin' and 'Tuesday' (though ironically not in the 'Trike' clip, on which he actually played the organ solo). Rogers later said that he was never quite comfortable with the electric piano on stage because he felt the band lost its spontaneous feel.

== Discography ==
- Sound as Ever (1993)
- Hi Fi Way (1995)
- Hourly, Daily (1996)
- #4 Record (1998)
- Dress Me Slowly (2001)
- Deliverance (2002)
- Convicts (2006)
- Dilettantes (2008)
- You Am I (2010)
- Porridge & Hotsauce (2015)
- The Lives of Others (2021)

== Awards and nominations ==
=== APRA Awards ===
The APRA Awards are held in Australia and New Zealand by the Australasian Performing Right Association to recognise songwriting skills, sales and airplay performance by its members annually.

Year	Nominee / work	Award	Result	Ref.
2022	"The Waterboy" (Tim Rogers)	Most Performed Rock Work	Nominated	
2022	"The Waterboy" (Tim Rogers)	Song of the Year	Shortlisted	

=== ARIA Music Awards ===
The annual ARIA Music Awards are presented by the Australian Recording Industry Association. You Am I have received ten awards from thirty two nominations.

Year	Nominated work	Award	Result	Ref.
1994	Sound as Ever	Best Alternative Release	Won	
1995	Hi Fi Way	Album of the Year	Nominated	
1995	Hi Fi Way	Best Group	Nominated	
1995	Hi Fi Way	Best Alternative Release	Won	
1995	"Jewels and Bullets" – Robbie Douglas-Turner	Best Video	Nominated	
1995	Hi Fi Way – Simon Anderson	Best Cover Art	Nominated	
1996	Hourly, Daily	Best Group	Won	
1996	Hourly, Daily	Album of the Year	Won	
1996	Hourly, Daily	Best Independent Release	Won	
1996	Hourly, Daily	Best Alternative Release	Nominated	
1996	"Mr. Milk"	Single of the Year	Nominated	
1996	Hourly, Daily – You Am I	Producer of the Year	Won	
1996	Hourly, Daily – Paul McKercher, Wayne Conolly	Engineer of the Year	Won	
1996	"Soldiers" (Andrew Lancaster)	Best Video	Won	
1996	Hourly, Daily – Simon Anderson	Best Cover Art	Nominated	
1997	"Good Mornin'", "Tuesday" – Phil McKellar	Engineer of the Year	Nominated	
1997	"Tuesday" – Mark Hartley	Best Video	Nominated	
1998	#4 Record	Album of the Year	Nominated	
1998	#4 Record	Best Group	Nominated	
1998	#4 Record	Best Alternative Release	Nominated	
1999	"Heavy Heart"	Best Group	Nominated	
2001	Dress Me Slowly	Album of the Year	Nominated	
2001	Dress Me Slowly	Best Group	Nominated	
2001	Dress Me Slowly	Best Alternative Release	Nominated	
2001	"Damage"	Single of the Year	Nominated	
2003	Deliverance – James Bellesini, Love Police	Best Cover Art	Nominated	
2004	The Cream & the Crock – James Bellesini, Love Police	Best Cover Art	Nominated	
2004	The Cream & the Crock	Best Music DVD	Nominated	
2006	Convicts	Best Rock Album	Nominated	
2007	Who Are They, These Rock Stars?	Best Music DVD	Won	
2009	Dilettantes – Greg Wales	Engineer of the Year	Won	
2016	Bargain Bin Bon Vivants	Best Australian Live Act	Nominated	

=== Mo Awards ===
The Australian Entertainment Mo Awards (commonly known informally as the Mo Awards), were annual Australian entertainment industry awards. They recognise achievements in live entertainment in Australia from 1975 to 2016. You Am I won one award in that time.

Year	Nominee / work	Award	Result (wins only)
1996	You Am I	Rock Performer of the Year	Won

=== Music Victoria Awards ===
The Music Victoria Awards, are an annual awards night celebrating Victorian music. They commenced in 2005.

Year	Nominee / work	Award	Result	Ref.
2021	David Lane (You Am I)	Best Musician	Nominated	

=== Triple J Hottest 100 ===
The annual music poll Triple J Hottest 100 was inaugurated in 1989 and is based on the public votes of Australian youth radio station Triple J listeners. You Am I has scored 14 songs in the annual Hottest 100. In July 2009 "Berlin Chair" came in at No. 52 on their Hottest 100 songs of all time. Hi Fi Way and Hourly, Daily were voted into the "Hottest 100 Australian Albums of All Time" list in 2011 at No. 35 and No. 26, respectively.

Year	Work	Position	Ref.
1993	"Adam's Ribs"	50	
1994	"Berlin Chair"	23	
1994	"Jaimme's Got a Gal"	77	
1995	"Cathy's Clown"	84	
1995	"Jewels and Bullets"	94	
1995	"Purple Sneakers"	24	
1996	"Soldiers"	80	
1996	"Good Mornin'"	84	
1998	"Rumble"	65	
1998	"Heavy Heart"	9	
1998 All Time	"Berlin Chair"	61	
2000	"Damage"	23	
2000	"Get Up"	57	
2001	"Kick a Hole in the Sky"	56	
2002	"Who Put the Devil in You"	79	
2011	Hourly, Daily	26	
2011	Hi Fi Way	35	
