= Purple Sneakers =

Single by You Am I

from the album Hi Fi Way
- Released: June 1995
- Recorded: Greene St. Recording, New York City
- Genre: Alternative rock
- Length: 3:30
- Label: rooArt Records
- Songwriter(s): Rusty Hopkinson, Andy Kent, Tim Rogers
- Producer(s): Lee Ranaldo

You Am I singles chronology
"Jewels and Bullets" (1995)	"Purple Sneakers" (1995)	"Mr. Milk" (1995)

"Purple Sneakers" is the third single from the album Hi Fi Way by Australian rock band You Am I. It was released in 1995 and was listed at number 24 on Triple J Hottest 100, 1995.

The song opens with the lyric "Had a scratch only you could itch, underneath the Glebe Point bridge", which refers to the Anzac Bridge, Sydney. The Glebe Island Bridge was still under construction when Tim Rogers wrote and recorded the song in 1994, with the bridge's official name changing to Anzac Bridge on Remembrance Day in 1998.

== Track listing ==
1. "Purple Sneakers" – 3:30
2. "Sci-Fi Way" - 2:42
3. "We're Desperate" - 1:59

Tracks 1 and 2 are written by (Rogers); track 3 by X.

"Sci-Fi Way" is an instrumental which features samples taken from 1950s sci-fi movies and other television shows including Ren & Stimpy. "We're Desperate" is a cover of X's song and features Rusty Hopkinson on backing vocals.

== Charts ==
Chart performance for "Purple Sneakers"
Chart (1995)	Peak position
Australia (ARIA)	128
