= Who Put the Devil in You =

"Who Put The Devil In You"

Single by You Am I

from the album Deliverance
- Released: September 2002
- Recorded: Sing Sing Studios, Melbourne
- Genre: Alternative rock
- Length: 3:21
- Label: BMG Australia
- Songwriter(s): Tim Rogers
- Producer(s): You Am I

You Am I singles chronology
"Kick a Hole in the Sky" (2001)	"Who Put The Devil In You" (2002)	"Deliverance" (2003)

"Who Put The Devil In You" is the first single from the album Deliverance by Australian rock band You Am I. It was released in 2002 and reached number 79 in that year's Hottest 100.

It was released as an exclusive download from You Am I's website.

== Track listing ==
All music is composed by You Am I

No.	Title	Length
1.	"Who Put The Devil In You"	3:21
2.	"You Got Lucky"	4:03
3.	""Cream & The Crock (live)""	3:20
Total length:		10:44

"You Got Lucky" and "Cream & The Crock" are You Am I originals. A remastered version of the former appeared on the Deliverance single. "Cream & The Crock" is an unreleased live track from ...Saturday Night, 'Round Ten.
