= Rumble (You Am I song) =

Single by You Am I

from the album #4 Record
- Released: April 1998
- Genre: Alternative rock
- Length: 2:36
- Label: rooArt
- Songwriter(s): Tim Rogers
- Producer(s): George Drakoulias

You Am I singles chronology
"What I Don't Know 'bout You" (1998)	"Rumble" (1998)	"Heavy Heart" (1998)

"Rumble" is the second single from the album #4 Record by Australian rock band You Am I. It was released in 1998 and reached number 65 in that year's Hottest 100.

== Track listing ==
1. "Rumble" – 2:36
2. "Arse-Kickin' Lady from the North-West" – 2:54
3. "I Live Under the Flightpath" – 2:54

All songs by Tim Rogers

The B-sides are all You Am I originals. "Arse-Kickin' Lady from the North-West" is also the opening track from the live album, ...Saturday Night, 'Round Ten, and along with "I Live Under the Flight Path" reappeared as re-recorded acoustic versions on the Tim Rogers & The Twin Set album What Rhymes with Cars and Girls.

== Charts ==
Chart performance for "Rumble"
Chart (1998)	Peak position
Australia (ARIA)	67
