= Jaimme's Got a Gal =

Single by You Am I

from the album Sound as Ever
- Released: May 1994
- Recorded: Cannon Falls, Minnesota
- Genre: Alternative rock
- Length: 3:29
- Label: rooArt
- Songwriter(s): Andy Kent, Tim Rogers, Mark Tunaley
- Producer(s): Lee Ranaldo

You Am I singles chronology
"Berlin Chair" (1994)	"Jaimme's Got a Gal" (1994)	"When You Got Dry/How Much Is Enough" (1994)

"Jaimme's Got a Gal" is the third single from the album Sound as Ever by Australian rock band You Am I. It was released in 1994 and peaked at number 93 on the Australian ARIA singles chart in June 1994. The song also reached #77 in that year's Hottest 100. The Jaimme of the title is Jaimme Rogers, the brother of You Am I's frontman and chief songwriter Tim Rogers, who had been a founding member of the band but left it within twelve months of its formation. "Jaimme's Got a Gal" thus partly explains the reason for his departure.

== Track listing ==
1. "Jaimme's Got a Gal" – 3:29
2. "I'm So Tired" – 2:13
3. "20,000" – 1:42

All songs by Tim Rogers, except 2 (Lennon–McCartney)

"I'm So Tired" is a cover of the Beatles song. "20,000" is a You Am I original, and the name of the single parodies Aerosmith's song "Janie's Got a Gun".

== Alternative versions ==
"Jaimme (Makers Mark Version)" is an acoustic version of "Jaimme's Got a Gal" which was released as a B-side on the "Berlin Chair" single. On the US release of Sound as Ever "Jaimme's Got a Gal" was one of the four tracks remixed by David Bianco.

== Charts ==
Chart performance for "Jaimme's Got a Gal"
Chart (1994)	Peak position
Australia (ARIA)	93
