= Soldiers (You Am I song) =

Single by You Am I

from the album Hourly, Daily
- Released: July 1996
- Studio: Q Studios, Sydney
- Genre: Alternative rock
- Length: 2:31
- Label: rooArt
- Songwriter(s): Tim Rogers
- Producer(s): You Am I

You Am I singles chronology
| "Mr. Milk" (1995) | "Soldiers" (1996) | "Good Mornin'" (1996) |

"Soldiers" is the second single from the album Hourly, Daily by Australian rock band You Am I. It was released in 1996 and reached number 80 in the 1996 Triple J Hottest 100 and number 33 on the Australian charts.

Tim Rogers said that the song was "very consciously" recorded with "boppy" horns, rather than distorted guitars, reflecting the music the band was listening to at the time. "You Am I were rock for four years, but we wanted to make something different."

The video clip directed by Andrew Lancaster won the ARIA Award for Best Video at the ARIA Music Awards of 1996.

== Track listing ==
1. "Soldiers" – 2:31
2. "Boulder Fair" – 2:12
3. "Six" – 2:51
4. "Count to Four" – 2:26

All songs by Tim Rogers.

"Boulder Fair", "Six" and "Count to Four" are all You Am I originals.

== Charts ==
Chart performance for "Soldiers"
| Chart (1996) | Peak position |
|---|---|
| Australia (ARIA) | 33 |
