= Deliverance (You Am I album) =

Studio album by You Am I
- Released: September 2002
- Label: BMG

You Am I chronology
Dress Me Slowly (2001)	Deliverance (2002)	No After You Sir...: An Introduction to You Am I (2003)

Professional ratings
Review scores
Source	Rating
Allmusic	3/5 stars

Deliverance is an album by the Australian rock band You Am I, released in 2002.

Tim Rogers later said of the album, "We just wanted 3-minute songs about being in love and rooting and loving being in a rock 'n' roll band and I think everyone associated with us absolutely hates it."

== Reception ==
Trouser Press said, "The Stones influence is even more evident on Deliverance; the guitars twang and grind, and the vibe is more spontaneous. Rogers is also looser, vocally, although his sanded-down Rod Stewart pipes thankfully maintain a certain distinctive You Am I-ness in the proceedings. The songs are appealing, but not all great."

== Track listing ==
All songs written by Tim Rogers.

1. "Words For Sadness"
2. "Who Put the Devil in You"
3. "'Til The Clouds Roll Away"
4. "Ribbons and Bows"
5. "Deliverance"
6. "One Trick Tony"
7. "The Wrong Side Now"
8. "Nifty Lil' Number Like You"
9. "City Lights"
10. "Crash"
11. "Nuthin's Ever Gonna Be the Same Again"
12. "When You Know What You Want"

== Charts ==
Chart (2002)	Peak position
Australian Albums (ARIA)	12
