= Trike (song) =

Single by You Am I

from the album Hourly, Daily (international version)
- Released: July 1997
- Recorded: Sound City Studios, California
- Genre: Alternative rock
- Length: 2:57
- Label: rooArt Records
- Songwriter(s): Tim Rogers
- Producer(s): George Drakoulias

You Am I singles chronology
| "'Tuesday'" (1997) | "Trike" (1997) | "'What I Don't Know 'bout You'" (1998) |

Trike is a single released by Australian rock band You Am I in 1997. It was released to make two tracks ("Trike" and "Opportunities") that were added to the international release of Hourly, Daily available to Australian fans, along with three extra B-sides. "Trike" and "Opportunities" were recorded in late 1996 and replaced "Someone Else's Home" and "Moon Shines on Trubble" from the Australian release.

== Track listing ==
1. "Trike" – 2:57
2. "Opportunities" – 2:46
3. "Who Turned Out The Lights" – 4:28
4. "I Can Hear The Grass Grow" – 3:26
5. "(There's Gonna Be A) Showdown" – 4:19

"Who Turned Out The Lights" is a You Am I original.

"I Can Hear The Grass Grow" is a cover of The Move song.

"(There's Gonna Be A) Showdown" is a cover of the Gamble and Huff song first recorded by Archie Bell & The Drells but then later covered by New York Dolls.
