= Get Up (You Am I song) =

Single by You Am I

from the album Dress Me Slowly
- Released: March 2001
- Studio: Q Studios, Sydney
- Genre: Alternative rock
- Length: 3:12
- Label: BMG Australia
- Songwriter(s): Tim Rogers
- Producer(s): Clif Norrell

You Am I singles chronology
"Damage" (2000)	"Get Up" (2001)	"Kick a Hole in the Sky" (2001)

"Get Up" is the second single from the album Dress Me Slowly by Australian rock band You Am I. It was released in 2001 and reached number 44 on the Australian national chart and number 57 in that year's Hottest 100.

== Track listing ==
1. "Get Up" – 3:12
2. "Older Guys" – 3:47
3. "Tourism" – 3:31
4. "Be Prepared" – 4:05
5. "Damage" – 3:27

"Older Guys", "Tourism", "Be Prepared" and "Damage" are all You Am I originals (Rogers). "Older Guys" was initially recorded for Dress Me Slowly but was left off to make way for newer songs, while "Tourism" is a demo recording of an otherwise unreleased song. "Be Prepared" is a solo Tim Rogers song. "Damage" is the same as the album and single version.

== Charts ==
Chart performance for "Get Up"
Chart (2001)	Peak position
Australia (ARIA)	44
