= When You Got Dry/How Much Is Enough =

Single by You Am I
- Released: November 1994
- Genre: Alternative rock
- Songwriter(s): (both songs) Tim Rogers, Andy Kent, Rusty Hopkinson

You Am I singles chronology
"Jaimme's Got A Gal" (1994)	"When You Got Dry/How Much Is Enough" (1994)	"Cathy's Clown" (1995)

"When You Got Dry/How Much Is Enough" was a double A-Side single only released on 7 inch vinyl in November 1994 by Australian rock band You Am I.

== Track listing ==
Side One

1. "When You Got Dry " – 3:22
2. "Ken (The Mother Nature's Son)" - 2:23

Side Two

1. "How Much Is Enough " - 3:41
2. "Bitter Young Man Of The Fanzine Press " - 1:54

All songs by Tim Rogers

== Charts ==
Chart performance for "When You Got Dry"/"How Much Is Enough"
Chart (1994)	Peak position
Australia (ARIA)	188
