= Hourly, Daily =

Studio album by You Am I
- Released: July 1996
- Studios: Q Studios, Sydney; Sound City Studios, Los Angeles
- Genre: Alternative rock
- Length: 52:06
- Labels: Ra; BMG; Warner Bros.; Sire

You Am I chronology
Hi Fi Way (1995)	Hourly, Daily (1996)	#4 Record (1998)

International cover
- International release cover

Professional ratings
Review scores
Source	Rating
AllMusic	4.5/5 stars
Rolling Stone Australia	4/5 stars
Juice	5/5 stars

Hourly, Daily is an album by the Australian rock band You Am I, released in July 1996. Themes include childhood, suburbia and relationships. The album also seems to run the course of a day, "Good Mornin'" beginning with an alarm clock, ending with the question of "Who Takes Who Home" on a night out, and after a period of silence, the hidden track entitled "Forget It Sister" begins with 'good morning baby..'

The album debuted at No. 1 on the Australian ARIA Albums Chart. In October 2010, Hourly, Daily, was listed in the book, 100 Best Australian Albums with their previous album, Hi Fi Way (1995) at No. 8. In December 2021, the album was listed at no. 11 in Rolling Stone Australia’s ‘200 Greatest Albums of All Time’ countdown.

== Composition ==
Musically, Rogers was influenced by pop music played by bands like Swervedriver and Teenage Fanclub. He said, "They had power, but they also had pop smarts. I just would hear that and go, 'Oh, I want that.' Thankfully, Andy and Russ went, 'Yeah, we'll go with that. But can we freak out at the end of every song and finish with a big calamitous things falling over?' 'Sure'. It wasn't really the style of the time to write something like that. But that's what the band were kind of listening to. Pop music and power pop."

Other influences on Rogers at the time were, "Patrick White books and Gerard Manley Hopkins poetry and definitely Kinks records. We did 200-and-something shows the year that we wrote that record and I was missing home. I guess I just needed something to keep my fragile little noggin together where we were doing these endless tours of the States."

== Recording ==
Hourly, Daily was recorded at Q Studios in Sydney and produced by the band themselves. Wayne Connolly and Paul McKercher handled engineering duties and the album was mixed in Los Angeles by David Bianco (producer) and Connolly.

== Reception ==
Reviewed in Rolling Stone Australia at the time of release, it was noted that You Am I were moving away from their earlier "screeching guitar" rock towards gentler and more melodic music. The additional accompaniment of trumpets, French horns and string sections was remarked upon. Tim Rogers' writing was said to be, "almost totally concerned with other people, crafting intricate character sketches in the Beatles/Ray Davies tradition."

Juice magazine complimented the musical "width" and "strongly hued richness" on the album, though wondering if old fans would respond to the less direct music. Lyrically, Rogers was said to have, "a thematic cohesion and eye for detail that brings to mind Neil Young or Paul Westerberg at their finest."

In a retrospective piece titled "You Am I Is the Longest Love Affair I Have Ever Had", FasterLouder writer A.H. Cayley singled out Hi Fi Way and Hourly, Daily as the two high points of the band's career, which You Am I fans speak of with a "hushed reverence".

Tim Rogers later said of the album, "I was probably listening to too many Kinks records, it must be said. I'm glad people like it, I don't listen to it."

== 2013 reissues, concert tour ==
In 2013, You Am I reissued remastered versions of Sound As Ever, Hi Fi Way, and Hourly Daily with bonus discs featuring B-sides, out-takes and live recordings. In the winter of 2013, the band toured major cities of Australia on the Hi Fi Daily Double Tour, performing both Hourly Daily and Hi Fi Way in their entirety, followed by an encore of other songs from these reissued collections. Vinyl versions of the three albums were released for the first time to coincide with this tour. In turn, a live recording from the 2013 tour was released as a vinyl/DVD box set titled Live Electrified in 2014.

== 30th Anniversary in 2026 ==
In October/November of 2026, You Am I performed a special run of east coast Australian shows to celebrate the 30th anniversary of Hourly Daily. Entitled the STRUNG UP tour, they hand-picked songs from Hourly Daily and selections from their entire career and were backed by a string quartet. The album was reissued on vinyl on Friday, October 9th alongside Dailies, Seconds: Demos and B-Sides, featuring a collection of 14 rarities from the same era as Hourly Daily. The album was also selected as Record Of The Month by Australian record club Waxx Lyrical for November 2026, AusMusic Month.

== Track listing ==
All songs written by Tim Rogers.

=== Australian version ===
1. "Hourly, Daily"
2. "Good Mornin'"
3. "Mr. Milk"
4. "Soldiers"
5. "Tuesday"
6. "If We Can't Get It Together"
7. "Flag Fall $1.80"
8. "Wally Raffles"
9. "Heavy Comfort"
10. "Dead Letter Chorus"
11. "Baby Clothes"
12. "Someone Else's Home"
13. "Please Don't Ask Me to Smile"
14. "Moon Shines on Trubble"
15. "Who Takes Who Home?"
16. "Forget It Sister" (hidden track)

=== International version ===
1. "Hourly, Daily"
2. "Good Mornin'"
3. "Mr. Milk"
4. "Soldiers
5. "Trike"
6. "Tuesday"
7. "Opportunities"
8. "If We Can't Get It Together"
9. "Flag Fall $1.80"
10. "Wally Raffles"
11. "Heavy Comfort"
12. "Dead Letter Chorus"
13. "Baby Clothes"
14. "Please Don't Ask Me to Smile"
15. "Who Takes Who Home?"
16. "Forget It Sister" (hidden track)

The international release (June 1997) replaced the songs "Someone Else's Home" and "Moon Shines on Trubble" with "Opportunities" and "Trike", supposedly to increase its overseas appeal by including songs that did not explicitly refer to Sydney or Australia. The international version also replaced the sleeve photo of the ubiquitous Australian overhead telegraph pole with a simpler photo of the band playing live. Unlike the original issue, the new cover also had the virtue of fitting in with You Am I's recurring theme of retro-styled album covers.

=== Beat Party! (Live at Wiseold's) ===
Some copies of the album came with a live bonus disc of songs recorded in May 1996 with Greg Hitchcock on second guitar and organ.

1. "Minor Byrd"
2. "Punkerella"
3. "She's So Fine" (The Easybeats cover)
4. "Making Time (Lyrice Ad Nauseum [sic] Mix)" (Creation cover)
5. "How Much Is Enough"
6. "Applecross Wing Commander"
7. "Search And Destroy" (The Stooges cover)

== Charts ==
Chart (1996/97)	Peak position
Australian Albums (ARIA)	1

== Certifications ==
Region	Certification	Certified units/sales
Australia (ARIA)	Platinum	70,000^{^}
^{^} Shipments figures based on certification alone.
