= Berlin Chair =

Single by You Am I

from the album Sound as Ever
- Released: February 1994
- Studio: Pachyderm Studio (Cannon Falls, Minnesota)
- Genre: Alternative rock
- Length: 2:34
- Label: rooArt
- Songwriter(s): Andy Kent; Tim Rogers; Mark Tunaley
- Producer(s): Lee Ranaldo

You Am I singles chronology
"Adam's Ribs" (1993)	"Berlin Chair" (1994)	"Jaimme's Got A Gal" (1994)

"Berlin Chair" is the second single from the album, Sound as Ever by Australian rock band, You Am I. It was released in 1994 and peaked at No. 73 on the Australian ARIA singles chart. "Berlin Chair" was also listed at No. 23 in that year's Triple J Hottest 100, while in the 1998 Hottest 100 of All Time it came in at No. 61 and No. 52 in the 2009 Hottest 100 of All Time. In a phone-in poll in 1999, the song was voted best Australian song of the 1990s.

== Composition ==
Tim Rogers started writing the song while living in Chippendale, Sydney. It was finished with help from Andy Kent and Mark Tunaley. Rogers had titled the song after seeing Berlin chair, a piece by Dutch furniture designer and architect Gerrit Rietveld, which Rogers had seen while living in Canberra years earlier. Biographer Craig Mathieson described the imagery of the chair as symbolising "the hard, even impenetrable male edge, that [the song's character] had with his girlfriend."

== Reception ==
In Hi Fi Days, Craig Mathieson stated that "time has not lessened the magic of this song." Mathieson praised the song's lyrics for revealing a character that "admit[s] they're flawed, but still swear[s] their strength, support [and] love." He praised the band's musical performance for "increas[ing] the momentum with every verse, adding vigour and desperation to Tim's emotion. ... 'Berlin Chair' leaves me drained and elated."

Double J reviewer, Dan Condon, rated it as the best Australian song of the 1990s, saying, "In a way, it defies description. It bears little resemblance to any other song. It isn’t traditionally catchy, yet it won’t leave your head from the moment you hear those first lines."

Junkee's David James Young said, "It's a song of co-dependency, trust and endearing love through one another's flaws. It's the kind of song any self-respecting band, genre regardless, would have fucking killed to have written."

In 2025, the song placed 81 on the Triple J's Hottest 100 of Australian Songs.

== Track listing ==
1. "Berlin Chair" – 2:34
2. "Can't Explain" – 2:10
3. "Jaimme (Makers Mark Version)" – 2:40
4. "All I Want to Do Is Rock" – 5:42

All songs by Tim Rogers, except 2 (Pete Townshend) and 4 (Ross Wilson)

The track, "Can't Explain", is a cover version of "I Can't Explain" by The Who. "Jaimme (Makers Mark Version)" is an acoustic version of "Jaimme's Got A Gal". "All I Want to Do Is Rock" is a cover of the Mighty Kong track.

== Cover versions ==
Australian band Kisschasy did a cover version of "Berlin Chair" for their 2007 single release of "Opinions Won't Keep You Warm At Night". Australian Band SMUDGE did a rendition for their 1994 Single "The Outdoor Type". The song has been performed by Holly Throsby on Triple J's Like a Version segments; while Kevin Mitchell, performing as Bob Evans, covered it with You Am I on one of the band's Live at the Wireless sets. Paul Dempsey included his version on "Shotgun Karaoke" EP, released in 2013.

== Appearances in other media ==
The song's lyrics featured in the storyline of the Australian drama series Upright (2019) during season's 1 episode 5. The appearance references a common misunderstanding of the lyrics to "Berlin Chair". In the episode, a character listens to "Berlin Chair" while driving a car, and repeatedly skips the song backwards, as she tries to decipher a word in the song's chorus. The character initially thinks that the lyrics are "If you wait, I'll give all my eggs to you", before later realising that Rogers in fact sings "I'll give all my aches to you".

The track was used in the PC game Quarantine (1994), which had a soundtrack exclusively featuring songs by Australian alternative bands.

== Charts ==
Chart performance for "Berlin Chair"
Chart (1994)	Peak position
Australia (ARIA)	73
