= Cathy's Clown (You Am I song) =

Single by You Am I

from the album Hi Fi Way
- Released: February 1995
- Studio: Greene St. Recording, New York City
- Genre: Alternative rock
- Length: 2:25
- Label: rooArt
- Songwriter(s): Rusty Hopkinson, Andy Kent, Tim Rogers
- Producer(s): Lee Ranaldo

You Am I singles chronology
"When You Got Dry/How Much Is Enough" (1994)	"Cathy's Clown" (1995)	"Jewels and Bullets" (1995)

"Cathy's Clown" is the first single from the album Hi Fi Way by Australian rock band, You Am I. It was released in 1995 and was the band's first single to reach the Australian Top 40 singles chart, peaking at number 36. It was listed at number 84 in the Triple J Hottest 100, 1995, an opinion poll of national radio station Triple J's listeners.

== Lyrics ==
In an interview with Jane Gazzo, Tim Rogers explained that the intro to Cathy's Clown is lifted from 'Everybody's Got Something to Hide" by The Beatles. "But the direct lift is from a version that the Hoodoo Gurus did on a live to air broadcast. Lyrically it's a mess, but the attempt was to get fictional about the job my then-partner Tracy was deep into. She was working at the State Library. She studied hard to get a senior position and her dedication to the profession was deeply impressive to me."

== Track listing ==
1. "Cathy's Clown" – 2:25
2. "Hi-Way Fi" – 2:55
3. "Gira E Respira" – 5:03
4. "In the Street" – 2:03

"Hi-Way Fi" and "Gira E Respira" are You Am I originals (Tim Rogers), and the former track can be found on the Hi Fi Way's bonus live disc, Someone Else's Crowd. "In the Street" is a cover of Big Star's song, written by its members Chris Bell and Alex Chilton.

== Charts ==
Chart performance for "Cathy's Clown"
Chart (1995)	Peak position
Australia (ARIA)	36
