= Andy Kent =

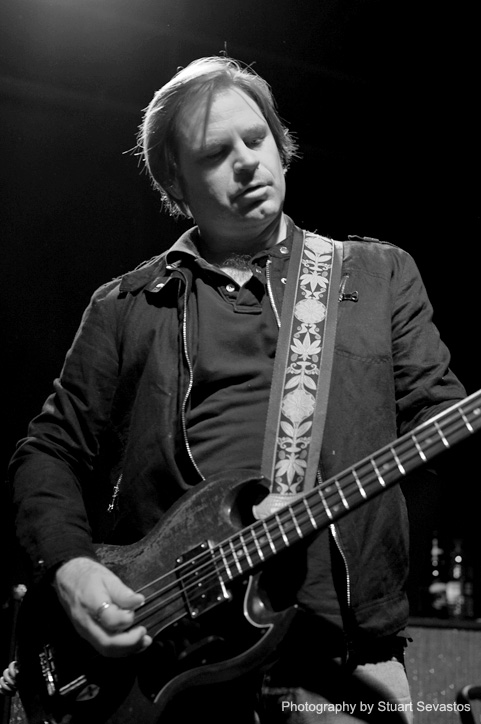
- Kent with You Am I in 2010

Background information
- Born: Andrew Charles Kent; 1969 (age 56–57); Wellington, New Zealand
- Genre: Rock
- Occupation: Musician
- Instrument: Bass guitar
- Years active: 198?–present
- Website: You Am I website

Andrew Charles Kent (born 1969) is the bass player for Australian rock band You Am I.

== Biography ==
Andy Kent was born in Wellington, New Zealand. He joined You Am I in late 1991. At the age of twenty-two, he replaced Nick Tischler, and joined Tim Rogers with new drummer Mark Tunaley (who had replaced Rogers' brother Jaimme). Kent was the band's live sound engineer prior to being asked to join the band at a performance in Canberra. Kent's first recorded appearance with the band was on their Goddamn EP in 1992. Tuanaley later left the band after the release of their first album, Sound As Ever, and was replaced by Rusty Hopkinson.

During the band commentary on The Cream and the Crock DVD, Tim and Andy mention that Kent was originally going to be the guitarist in You Am I, because of his level of proficiency. Ultimately he became the bass player.

In 2002, Kent took over the management of You Am I. He also runs concert promoting company Love Police Touring and independent record label, Love Police Records & Tapes.

Kent has also played bass for The Vines on their 2006 studio album, Vision Valley.

At the fourth annual Jack Awards in 2007, Kent won 'The Ian Rilen Best Bass Guitarist' award.
