= The Great Old Ones =

Studio album by Lubricated Goat
- Released: 2003
- Recorded: May 2003
- Studio: Studio G, Brooklyn, NY
- Genre: Noise rock
- Length: 34:18
- Label: Reptilian

Lubricated Goat chronology
Forces You Don't Understand (1994)	The Great Old Ones (2003)

The term "The Great Old Ones" may also refer to a group of Cthulhu Mythos deities.

The Great Old Ones is an album by noise rock group Lubricated Goat, released in 2003 by Reptilian Records. It featured 2003 re-recordings of previously released Lubricated Goat and Crunt tracks.

== Track listing ==
All tracks are written by Stu Spasm

No.	Title	Originally from (date)	Length
1.	"Bad Times"	Dope-Guns-'N-Fucking in the Streets Volume Four compilation (1990)	2:22
2.	"Spoil the Atmosphere"	Psychedelicatessen (1990)	3:57
3.	"Nerve Quake"	Plays the Devil's Music (1987)	2:31
4.	"Stroke"	Psychedelicatessen (1990)	3:22
5.	"Frotting With Ennio"	Plays the Devil's Music (1987)	1:25
6.	"Snap Out of It"	Crunt (1994)	3:51
7.	"You Remain Anonymous"	Forces You Don't Understand (1994)	3:58
8.	"Jason the Unpopular"	Plays the Devil's Music (1987)	2:31
9.	"Cannibals' Lament"	Paddock of Love (1988)	3:46
10.	"Play Dead"	"Play Dead" 7" (1993)	3:05
11.	"You're Fading Out"	Psychedelicatessen (1990)	3:31

== Personnel ==
Lubricated Goat

- Ant Migliaccio – guitar
- Hayden Millsteed – drums, percussion, backing vocals
- Jack Natz – bass guitar, backing vocals
- Stu Spasm – lead vocals, guitar, cover art

Production and additional personnel

- Joel Hamilton – engineering, mixing
- Tony Maimone – engineering, mixing
- Doug Milton – mastering

== Release history ==
Region	Date	Label	Format	Catalog
United States	2003	Reptilian	CD	REP 071
