= Cop =

Cop or Cops may refer to:

== Arts and entertainment ==
=== Film ===
- Cop (film), a 1988 American thriller
- Cops (film), a 1922 American silent comedy short starring Buster Keaton
- The Cop (1928 film), an American silent drama
- The Cop (1970 film), a French-Italian crime film
- A Cop (1947 film), a French drama
- Un flic ('A Cop'), a 1972 French crime film

=== Music ===
- COP International, a record label
- The Cops (Australian band), formed 2003
  - Cops (EP), 2004
- Cop (album), by Swans, 1984
- "Cop", a song by Alkaline Trio on the 1998 album Goddamnit
- "The Cop", a song by The Knife on the 2003 album Deep Cuts

=== Television ===
- Cop (TV series), a 2019 Russian crime comedy-drama
- Cops (TV program), an American documentary series since 1989
- COPS (animated TV series), 1988–1989
- The Cops (British TV series), 1998–2001
- The Cops (Israeli TV series), 2021

=== Other uses in arts and entertainment ===
- C.O.P. The Recruit, a 2009 video game

== Businesses and organisations ==
=== Businesses ===
- Columbus Outdoor Pursuits, parent organization of the Great Ohio Bicycle Adventure
- ConocoPhillips, an energy company, NYSE symbol COP
- COP Inc., manufacturer of the COP .357 Derringer pistol
- Copper State Air Service, an airline with ICAO designator COP

=== Organisations ===
- Cathedral of Praise, a megachurch in Manila, Philippines
- Olympic Committee of Portugal (Comité Olímpico de Portugal, COP)
- Political and Security Committee (Comité politique et de sécurité, COPS), of the European Union
- College of Paramedics, a professional body for paramedics in the UK
- Communities Organized for Public Service, a Texas community organization
- Community Oriented Policing Services, an agency of the U.S. Department of Justice
- Conference of the parties, the supreme governing body of an international convention
  - United Nations Climate Change Conference, conferences commonly called COP followed by the edition number
- Congress of the People (Trinidad and Tobago), a political party

== Places ==
- Cop, Haiti, a town in the Aquin Arrondissement
- Central Industrial Region (Poland) (Centralny Okreg Przemyslowy, COP)
- Canada Olympic Park, in Calgary, Alberta, Canada
- Chop, Ukraine, Cop is an alternative spelling found in some sources

== Science and technology ==
=== Computing ===
- COP, an interrupt in 65xx processors
- COPS (software), a UNIX security tool
- C Object Processor, a superset of the C programming language
- Common Open Policy Service, a network management protocol
- Common operational picture, a type of military technology
- Computer operating properly timer (COP timer), a watchdog timer

=== Other uses in science and technology ===
- Center of pressure (terrestrial locomotion) (CoP), in biomechanics
- Coefficient of performance, in thermodynamics
- Community of practice, a group of people who share a craft or a profession
- Opposite category (C^{op}), in mathematical category theory
- Cryptogenic organizing pneumonia, an illness
- Cyclic olefin polymer, an amorphous polymer
- COP, a variant of the chemotherapy regimen CHOP

== Other uses ==
- Cop, a slang term for a police officer
- Cop Weathers (1898–1964), American football player
- Čop (surname), including a list of people with the name
- Cop, the ball which builds up on the spindle in spinning
- Code of Points, another name for the ISU Judging System used to score ice skating
- Colombian peso (COP), a currency
- Combat outpost (COP)
- Coptic language, ISO 639-2/3 code cop
- Cost of products sold (COPS), concept in economics
- Close of play (COP), or end of day
- Community ophthalmic physician, a type of medical ophthalmologist in Ireland

== See also ==
- Copper (disambiguation)
