= Nursery Crimes (band) =

- Origin: Melbourne, Victoria, Australia
- Genres: Hardcore punk, power pop
- Years active: 1989–1994, 2006–2007, 2017, 2023
- Labels: Au Go Go, Shock, Normal, Survival, MDS
- Past members: Phil Rose; David Dixon; James McInnes; Shane Bush; Dave Ross; Paddy Chong; Dave Dixon; Russell Hopkinson; Caine Knight; Phil Rose; Davarj Thomas; James Masson; James McIness; Chris Latham; Ross Hetherington; Lonny Finn

Nursery Crimes were an Australian hardcore punk band from Melbourne. They formed in early 1989 by Phil Rose on lead vocals. They played both locally and around Australia before disbanding in 1994. They released two full-length albums, some singles and extended plays. Their debut releases were "All Torn up Inside" (1989 single), No Time for That Crime (1990 extended play, on pink bubblegum vinyl) and Fun Hurts! (May 1992, studio album). They were early pioneers and supporters of "all-ages", no-alcohol gigs, to allow a wider and younger audience to experience live music. Nursery Crimes were a support act on Australian tours by L7, Henry Rollins, Faith No More, Fugazi and All. Australian musicologist, Ian McFarlane, described how Nursery Crimes' "sound was built around melodic yet crunching guitar riffs, frenetic arrangements, rapid fire lead vocals and sweet harmonies". The group reunited for a series of gigs in 2006.

== History ==
Nursery Crimes formed in Melbourne in early 1989 with Paddy Chong on bass guitar; Dave Dixon on guitar and backing vocals; Caine Knight on lead guitar; Russell Hopkinson on drums (ex-Vicious Circle, Bamboos, Kryptonics, Cremator); and Phil Rose (aka Richard Andrew Rose) on lead vocals (ex-Slush Puppies). Australian musicologist, Ian McFarlane, described how their "sound was built around melodic yet crunching guitar riffs, frenetic arrangements, rapid fire lead vocals and sweet harmonies".

Their debut single, "All Torn up Inside", was issued on Au Go Go Records late in the following year, together with their extended play, No Time for That Crime. Chong left the group to join Girl Monstar and then The Fuck Fucks, he was replaced on bass guitar by Davarj Thomas, who also provided backing vocals.

Nursery Crimes left Au Go Go and joined Survival Records, and in 1990 they released another EP, Marked by Time, which was produced by Kaj Dahlstrom. For the European market, the group provided a compilation album, What Do You Know (Anyway)? on Normal Records. In April 1991 they issued their second single, "Eleanor Rigby", a cover version of The Beatles' 1966 song. Knight was replaced on lead guitar by James Masson, who added piano.

The group's debut studio album, Fun Hurts!, appeared in May 1992. It was co-produced by the band and Dahlstrom. McFarlane described it as "amphetamine-charged". By the end of that year Masson was replaced on guitar by James McInnes, and Chris Latham replaced Hopkinson on drums who joined You Am I.

In August 1993 the group released another EP, Something's Wrong with Our Heroes, and undertook a national tour to support it. Early the following year Nursery Crimes disbanded. During their career Nursery Crimes were a support act on Australian tours by L7, Henry Rollins, Faith No More, Fugazi and All. Thomas later joined pre.shrunk (1996–2003). In 1994 McInnes and Rose formed Shreen, McFarlane compared the two groups "Like Nursery Crimes, Shreen's sound combined melodic pop hooks, incisive guitar riffs, tight harmonies and rapid tempos". Dixon later joined the same group, which disbanded in 1996.

Rose has co-written material for Bodyjar, a Melbourne-based punk rock group. In mid-2006 Nursery Crimes reunited for a series of gigs in October and November with the line up of Dixon, Rose, Thomas, and McIness, joined by Ross Hetherington on drums (ex-Bodyjar).

In 2017, the band reunited again to open for Descendents (U.S.A), with Frenzal Rhomb drummer Gordy Forman filling in on drums.

In 2018 Rose was a co-writer & member of the collective TQX who released a debut LP 'Global Intimacy'. The record featured contributions from a variety of artists including: SIA, Barney McAll & Kool AD.

In 2023, the band reunited to play shows with The Hard Ons with a new line-up consisting of Phil Rose, David Dixon, James McInnes along with Shane Bush on Bass & Lonny Finn (28 Days) on drums. In October 2023, the band once again played shows with Descendents in Sydney & Melbourne.

In late 2024, the band recruited drummer Dave Ross (Civil Dissident, Vicious_Circle_(band), Massappeal, Caligula_(band) & Fun Again) to again support The Hard Ons and play a well-received Melbourne headline show - their first in 17 years.

In 2025, with a revived energy, the band are organising local shows and interstate tours and are busy writing new songs before heading into the recording studio later in the year.

Nursery Crimes on stage at Marrickville Bowlo, Sydney. November 14th, 2026.

In 2026 Nursery Crimes toured to celebrate the 35th anniversary of the album "Fun Hurts." The tour posters were headed: "35 years on - playtime was never safe. Nursery Crimes. Fun still hurts!"

== Members ==
- Paddy Chong – bass guitar (1989–1990)
- Dave Dixon – guitar, vocals (1989–1994, 2006–2007, 2017, 2023)
- Russell Hopkinson – drums, percussion (1989–1992)
- Caine Knight – guitar (1989–1991)
- Phil Rose – vocals (1989–1994, 2006–2007, 2017, 2023)
- Davarj Thomas – bass guitar (1991–1994, 2006–2007, 2017)
- James Masson – guitar, piano (1991–1992)
- James McIness – guitar (1992–1994, 2006–2007, 2017, 2023)
- Chris Latham – drums (1992–1994)
- Ross Hetherington – drums (2006–2007)
- Gordy Forman - drums (2017)
- Shane Bush - Bass (2023)
- Lonny Finn - Drums (2023)
- Dave Ross - Drums (2024)

== Discography ==
=== Albums ===
- What Do You Know (Anyway)? (compilation album, 1990) – Rattlesnake Records, Shock Records/Normal Records (RAT 510)
- Fun Hurts! (1992) – Survival Records (SUR518 CD/469146.2)

=== Extended plays ===
- No Time for That Crime (1990) – Au Go Go Records (ANDA 117)
- Marked by Time (1990) – Au Go Go Records, Survival Records (SUR702CD)
- Something's Wrong with Our Heroes (August 1993) – MDS (ABC123)

=== Singles ===
- "All Torn Up Inside" – (1989)
- "Eleanor Rigby" – (1991)
- "Marked By Time" - (1992)
