= Schadenfreude (EP) =

1989 EP by Lubricated Goat

EP by Lubricated Goat
- Released: May 1989
- Recorded: April 1989
- Studio: Sound Barrier Studios, Sydney, Australia
- Genre: Noise rock, post-punk
- Length: 22:54
- Label: Black Eye
- Producer: Dave Boyne, Stu Spasm

Lubricated Goat chronology
Paddock of Love (1988)	Schadenfreude (1989)	Psychedelicatessen (1990)

Schadenfreude is an EP by Australian noise rock band Lubricated Goat, released in May 1989 by Black Eye Records.

== Track listing ==
All tracks are written by Lubricated Goat

No.	Title	Length
1.	"Shut Your Mind"	3:22
2.	"Prayer for Blood"	3:14
3.	"Magumbo Head"	2:50
4.	"The Hunt Is Better Than the Kill"	4:13
5.	"Toys"	4:50
6.	"Melting"	4:23

== Personnel ==
Adapted from the Schadenfreude liner notes.

Lubricated Goat

- Guy Maddison – bass guitar
- Gene Ravet – drums
- Stu Spasm – lead vocals, guitar, production
- Charles Tolnay – guitar

Production and additional personnel

- Dave Boyne – production
- John Foy – cover art

== Release history ==
Region	Date	Label	Format	Catalog
Australia	1989	Black Eye	CD, LP	BLACK 3
