= Goba (disambiguation) =

Goba may refer to:

- Goba, Ubungo, an administrative ward of Ubungo District of Dar es Salaam Region, Tanzania
- Goba, a town in Ethiopia
- Goba, Mozambique
- Goba (woreda) the district or woreda containing the town of Goba
- Great Ohio Bicycle Adventure (GOBA), an annual bicycle tour
- Kévin Goba (born 1987), French footballer
- Moud Goba, LGBTIQ+ human rights activist
