= The S.I.G.I.T. =

Indonesian rock band

The S.I.G.I.T. (The Super Insurgent Group of Intemperance Talent)
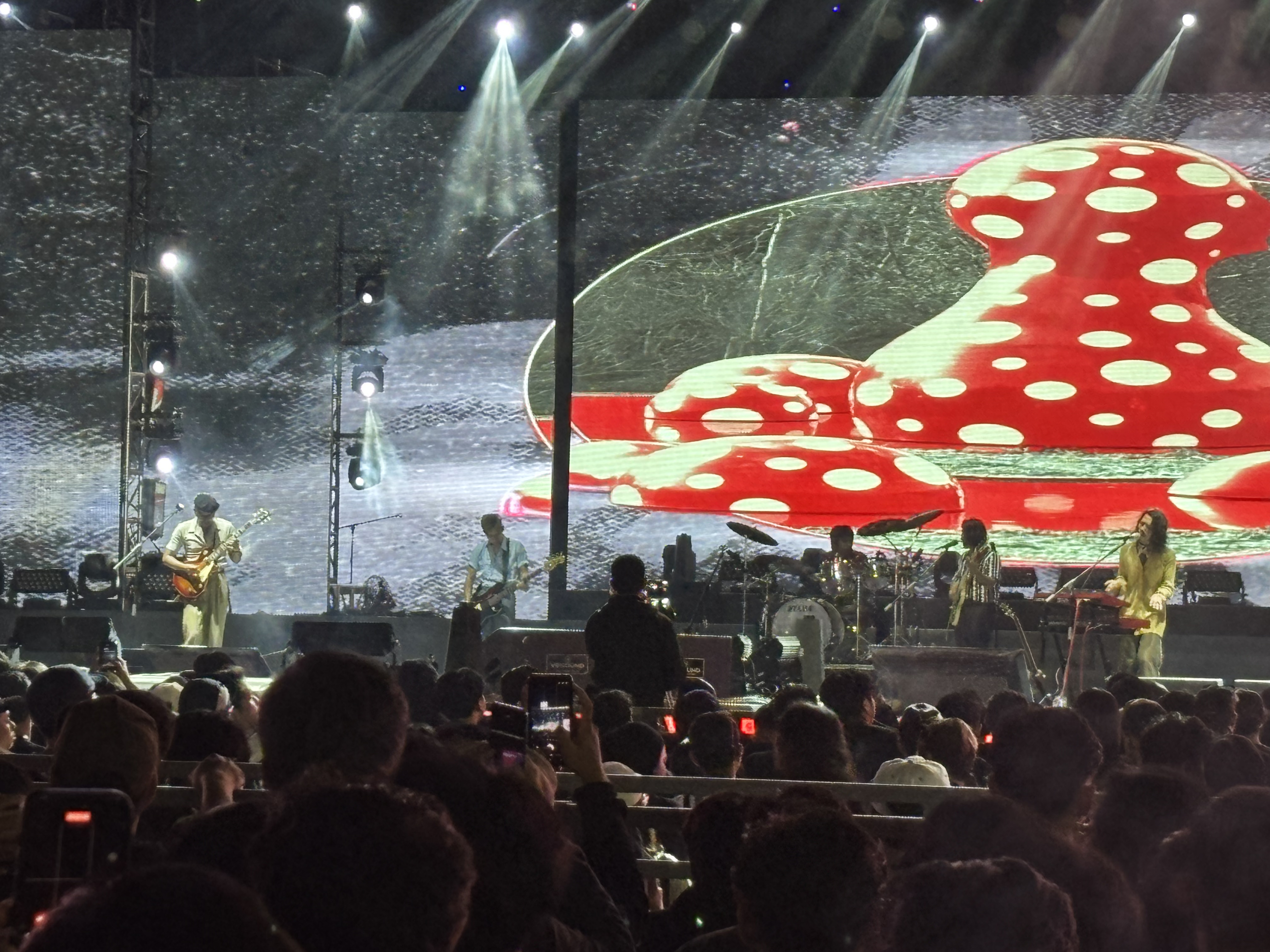
- The S.I.G.I.T. at Jakarta Fair, July 2025

Background information
- Origin: Bandung, West Java, Indonesia
- Genres: Hard rock; garage rock; blues rock; psychedelic rock
- Years active: 2002–present
- Labels: FFWD Records; Caveman!; Spills
- Members: Rekti Yoewono; Aghan Sudrajat; Farri Icksan; Absar Lebeh; Raveliza R.A.
- Past members: Aditya Bagja Mulyana; Acil Armando
- Website: www.thesigit.com

The S.I.G.I.T. (The Super Insurgent Group of Intemperance Talent, often stylized as The SIGIT) is an Indonesian rock band based in Bandung, Indonesia. The band consists of Rektivianto "Rekti" Yoewono (vocals, guitar), Farri Icksan Wibisana (guitar), Aghan Sudrajat (bass), and Absar Lebeh (guitar). They have three studio albums and two EPs: Visible Idea of Perfection (2007) and Detourn (2020); The S.I.G.I.T. (2004) and the two-parted Hertz Dyslexia that was released separately in 2009 and 2011.

When asked about the origin of the band's name, Rekti explained, "I was on the internet with nothing to do, so I just had this silly thought about searching for my name on Google. I thought, "What does 'Rekti' mean on the other side of the world?" Then I decided to do the same with my father's name, Sigit. Then I found this website sigit.com which was a science interests group's website, and I thought it would be a cool name for the band, so I worked on the abbreviation stand." The band later admitted that the idea of abbreviating the name came from Black Rebel Motorcycle Club, one of their influences.

They described themselves as hard rock band and often being compared to Wolfmother and The Datsuns. They were even dubbed as "The Indonesians answer to Wolfmother" by an Australian media.

== History ==
=== Formation and early years (1997–2004) ===
Rekti, Aditya, and Acil had known each other since middle school. They often had band practice together, mainly with the influence from Led Zeppelin, The Stone Roses and many more classic rock bands. Not long after, in high school, Farri came along and joined the band with a sense of musical arrangement and, of course, the same taste in music, so they started to write their own songs and later played at local gigs and school events.

In classroom, the group would discreetly listen to their 70s influences, in addition to recent phenomenon britpop, shoegaze and punk music at times. Every day after school, the band experimented in their garage, where they emulated sounds and styles they had heard earlier. The S.I.G.I.T.’s wide range of stylistic interests made it difficult for the band to identify the music styles that would fit under their inventive material, initially.

In the early years, they were a cover band for their idols. They often covered The Clash's to Led Zeppelin's in rehearsals. Later they thought it would be better if they start to play their own songs. They were one of the many local bands that surfaced born during 2000s. A time of stagnancy, judging from intensity of music events; unlike the 90's. Even though many of those gigs were held with lack of funds, everyone involved was doing it in such will—the D.I.Y. mentality was very strong at those times. The band admitted that help from various local communities in Bandung was really helpful to the band and other local independent acts that were in the same cause.

Formed in the early 2000s — a time when artists like Limp Bizkit and Britney Spears were dominating the airwaves — The S.I.G.I.T. wonder how their rock-based tendencies and reverences for multiple styles would be received by audiences. They soon began to send out invitations to weekly garage gigs, which also served beers and barbecues, and their engaging music. The audience’s reaction was extremely positive and the four-piece realized they would not be forced to confine to radio conventions to gain listeners. Their authentic love for good old rock and roll would be more than enough.

=== Record deal and self-titled EP (2004–2005) ===
In 2004 they signed with Spills Records and later, in response to popular garage gigs, they released their debut EP in late 2004. It received mixed reception. Notably when some people started to call them "mainstream rock 'n' roll" group because throughout this times, The White Stripes broke out into mainstream chart with Elephant; which was a garage rock album. People dubbed them as "too White Stripes". But the band had a denial by saying:

"Yes, coincidentally, this recent years are emerging with the wave of garage rock. Of course, we are aware and following this. Not because it had become a "trend", but because we've always been fans of this kind of music. Imagine the feeling that the music you love reborn and then many great bands come along to surf with the wave. But even though this emerging wave hadn't happened, I'm absolutely sure that we'll still be doing what we are doing right now—which is influenced by rock music from 60's, and 70's."

In the legion of garage rock revivalist, they were one of the new crop of bands that looked further into the past for inspiration and emerged triumphantly. Critics could argue that they, with all its pretentious moniker, were just a passing fad — a band that swam in the slipstream of the garage rock revival promoted by contemporaries like The Datsuns, Kings of Leon, or Wolfmother — but one needs only checking out their live shows to see some raw power in the work, a ferocious rock 'n' roll in the likes of AC/DC and Deep Purple. Haven't yet released a proper album, they'd won a cult following. And as many of us witnessed, the single "Soul Sister" somehow became a radio hit in Bandung and Jakarta. That was when the comparison between them and The Datsuns, who had actually been their good friends, started.

Then one afternoon, they were asked by producer of the movie Catatan Akhir Sekolah if their song could contribute for the soundtracks and would they even make an appearance in that movie. And so they did. In the scene of graduation night celebration, they played "Did I Ask Your Opinion?", where they were the guest star for the night. After that contribution, their fans grew rapidly; and not just in Bandung or Jakarta.

Spills Records didn't renew their contract (or they might dissolved) and began to use social medias to spread themselves. And with the help of their manager, Gino, they played in bigger music events; even appeared on NME's Stereo that said, "Black Amplifier: Scorching, gonzo Zep Rock from our hot new Indonesian friend."

=== Visible Idea of Perfection (2007) ===
With high-energy and passionate performances their profile began to rise rapidly through live shows. After many successful gigs, the local label FFWD (Fast Forward) came calling and signed them. The label provided opportunities for them to perform outside their garage. They started to rearrange songs from previously released EP. And with some new songs they had worked on, they released their first full-length album Visible Idea of Perfection under FFWD's subsidiary label FFCUTS. Not very long until people on the other side of the world caught their music. A year later, an Australian label Caveman! Records, signed them as one of their acts.

Caveman! released and distributed the record in Australia. In which afterwards in June 2007, The S.I.G.I.T. was invited to tour in Australia by the label. They were going to be the opening act for Dallas Crane, 67 Special, and The Beasts of Bourbon. The band agreed and so they had an Australia tour in hand. They were the first Indonesian band to have been brought to play in Australia by a label—it also became the first of many tours abroad.

On their Australia tour, they played in many venues, and bars in Sydney, Brisbane, Perth, and Fremantle. But, of course, most of the Australians watching didn't know of them. Not even a chord. But they received positive reviews from many Australian publications, and listeners. And even FasterLouder, an Australian media, quoted on saying, "...To top it all off, the supports were better calibre than most headliners I’ve seen lately, with Indonesia’s The S.I.G.I.T. playing old school rock 'n' roll better than Jet, and Children Collide though doing a somewhat circle jerk performance looking at nothing and shouting mainly unintelligible lyrics at the crowd; still pulled off some thumping bass grunge to impress the crowd. A top night from a headline band that need no props and don’t ask for accolades. You get what you see and if you don't like it tough."

After that successful first international appearances, The S.I.G.I.T. gained more and more followers who later call themselves the "Insurgent Army".

=== Hertz Dyslexia EP (2009) ===
After their first overseas tour in Australia, the band was scheduled to visit the United States to participate in the South by Southwest Festival (SXSW), in Austin, Texas. Unfortunately, the trip had to be cancelled because Acil's visa was rejected at the last minute. But they tried again the very next year; and this time they succeeded. They did a small United States tour, played four gigs with the main and last show being the SXSW Festival.

Despite the ups and downs, the band kept on playing their music with huge energy and passion as their fan base grew daily. The culmination point of this was in the music itself—they released their second EP: Hertz Dyslexia. Heartz Dyslexia was a two-parted EP that was released separately in between 2009 and 2011. The first included a cover of the famous Neil Young's "Only Love Can Break Your Heart" and the second one was released digitally on their website in the form of download code. And in conjunction with the recently released album, the band and its record company celebrated it by doing "The Dyslexia Concert" on 20 June in Bandung. The concert was planned to be held at The Venue, Eldorado.

A week before the celebratory concert, they had shows in Semarang and Yogyakarta. After each show the band would ask the fans if they would come to Bandung to attend the big show. For fans in other provinces there might be a problem because they have to buy the concert ticket, transport, and standard accommodations like hotel room—they didn't have that much money. They would have loved to and were willing to pay for the tickets but the money for other necessities was just not there. After coming home from the Central Java tour, the band had a discussion with the event organizer and later decided to provide transportation; fans could buy tickets with shuttle bus fare included, which definitely is easier. And the organizer extended invitations for fans from outside Bandung. This is a common thing for bands to do in the US or UK.

The sold-out concert was thoroughly enjoyed by everyone attended. More than three thousand people flocked from all over the country just to see what was destined to be a legendary concert. The S.I.G.I.T. was the only independent band to draw that many people from all over the country to come to see them live. Even more significant considering that most of their latest gigs have been for free. Rekti also thought the gig was something else on an interview afterward, saying:

"When you're on stage and you see so many people have come to your show, then they go home smiling at the end of the show, it makes you feel like you have succeeded. It is an overwhelming feeling."

Hertz Dyslexia was a good example of the band only playing what they wanted to play. The album was filled with rock music experiments, a bit different from what they have previously released. They moved a little away from traditional Led Zeppelin-style rock 'n' roll, and defined a new sound. Some of their fans will probably be surprised with the new material. On an interview with The Jakarta Post, they said,

"It's a new thing for us, we have never done this before—in terms of the musical journey as a band. It's pretty hard to describe, actually. Even though songs on this album come from our early periods, the executions had become a new expression of our ideas," Rekti, the lead vocalist and a charismatic frontman, said and added by Farri saying, "Hertz Dyslexia is a rough outline for our second full-album."

They have shown people they were strong enough to decide for themselves which musical direction they will take in the future. Not many bands can bravely stand at the top of their careers, and choose to do the unpopular thing; to release an experimental album. Well, they have not changed that much, but still, many people will be surprised by these changes.

The arrangements they used in Visible Idea of Perfection were deconstructed in Hertz Dyslexia. They aimed at giving people something unpredictable, but not too confusing. They tried many new methods, and used many different instruments in the sessions. This EP was a gateway to their second full-length album. Behind the scenes of their promotional sessions for Hertz Dyslexia, the band was working on material for their new album. However, these lads are still pursuing their love of learning, formally, in school. Rekti had just finished his postgraduate studies in Environmental Engineering at the Bandung Institute of Technology (ITB). Farri studied at the same postgraduate school, majoring in architecture. The other two members were the same; Adit was studying for his joint degree, and Acil was a full-time architect.

By this period they were still playing in many local rock music festivals, and school events. But they were more focused to finishing their education, and working on some new music.

=== Detourn (2013) ===
Detourn was released in March 2013, more than six years since their critically acclaimed debut album, Visible Idea of Perfection, back in 2007. During those times, they raced around the country's rock circuit, visiting a variety of places and performing their songs numerous times. But still they were in the process of finishing the album. On an interview, the band promised the album would be released in mid or late 2012 but later had to be postponed because they ran out of money or/and they had production issues.

Also the band was working towards perfection. They won't release it if they think it was not as good as the materials on the first LP. That helped to explain why the band had taken so long to finish their latest album. If they felt it wasn't good enough, this album might not have been released for another five years.

For fans and the industry, the album served as a release that had been anticipated for some time, as indicated by retail sales. The S.I.G.I.T. presented an approach to their rock music. The production on the album required a lengthy process and features sound explorations, transitions between songs, and work on beats. For some listeners, the album may be difficult to understand upon the first hearing. It is less accessible than the previous release, representing the current style of The S.I.G.I.T. Additionally, Rekti incorporated a flute and Irish whistle into "Son of Sam," instruments that are uncommon for a rock band.

The band planned to do another release show, similar to their release of Hertz Dyslexia. With help from their label, "Detournement" was held on 26 October 2013, at the same venue as "The Dyslexia Concert". Renowned for their lavish stage shows, the S.I.G.I.T. set high standards in sound quality, used innovative sound effects, and lightnings. Local musicians were invited to have appearance. Such as choir, backup singers, saxophone player, and many more talents. Like the concert four years ago, fans from all over the country attended this legendary event. Over three thousand fans came to a venue of five thousand. Many were left wondered because of several bizarre gestures from the personnel. One was as Rekti came out from backstage with eyes of Fatima on the palm of his hands and was in dark cloak. People might have misinterpreted this gimmick as "illuminati", but that was just his blessing for the fans—so they may be kept away from bad lucks. But though, the show went on clock-wise and was considered successful.

The S.I.G.I.T. continues to tour all around the country. Plays in school and college events or standard rock 'n' roll festivals. In January 2014, Rolling Stone Indonesia gave the album 4 stars out of 5 and later named it "The Album of the Year."

=== Live shows, tours, and lineup change (2014–present) ===
Due to the intricacy of playing songs from Detourn in live performances, they recruited Absar Lebeh as an additional guitar player. On 1 May 2016, the band was scheduled to visit Australia for another kickass tour on the country. The tour was set on two states, Victoria and New South Wales. In 2020, they released a single titled "Another Day"

In 2023, following the departure of former bassist Aditya Bagja Mulyana, The SIGIT announced a newly formed lineup, recruiting Indonesian band Monkey to Millionaire bassist and former crew member of the band, Aghan Sudrajat.

In 2024, Acil Armando announced his departure through a poem in his Instagram post, after spending more than two decades with the band. He has since been replaced by Raveliza starting from 2025.

== Band Members ==
Current Members

- Rektivianto "Rekti" Yoewono — vocals, guitar (2002 - present)
- Farri Icksan Wibisana — lead guitar (2002 - present)
- Aghan Sudradjat — bass guitar, backing vocals (2023 - present)
- Absar Lebeh — guitar (2023 - present)
- Raveliza Agustinus — drums (2025 - present)

Additional/Session/Touring Members

- Farhat 'Iyay' — harmonica (2009 - 2011)
- Aziz Saxsoul — saxophone, flute, occasional (2013–present)
- Absar Lebeh — guitar (2014 - 2023)
- Leon Sihombing — guitar, occasional (2014 - present)

Former Members

- Aditya Bagja Mulyana — bass guitar (2002 - 2023)
- Acil Armando — drums (2002 - 2024)

Timeline

== Discography ==
=== Albums ===
Title	Album details
Visible Idea of Perfection	Released: December 2006; Label: FFWD Records (Indonesia), Caveman! (Australia); Formats: CD, cassette, LP, digital download
Detourn	Released: March 21, 2013; Label: FFWD Records; Formats: CD, LP, digital download

=== EPs ===
Title	Album details
Self-titled	Released: December 2004; Label: Spills Records (Indonesia), Caveman! (Australia); Formats: CD, cassette
Hertz Dyslexia Part I	Released: June 2009; Label: FFWD Records; Formats: CD, LP, DVD, digital download
Hertz Dyslexia Part II	Released: 2011; Label: FFWD Records; Formats: CD, digital download

=== Compilations/Soundtracks ===
- Catatan Akhir Sekolah movie soundtrack (2005)
- Radit dan Jani movie soundtrack (2008)

== Awards and nominations ==
Year	Nominee / work	Award	Result
2007	Visible Idea of Perfection	Rolling Stone Indonesia — Best Album	Won
2007	The S.I.G.I.T.	Hai Magazine — Best Indie Band	Won
2007	The S.I.G.I.T.	Grey Magazine — Best Band	Won
2008	The S.I.G.I.T.	Indonesian Music Awards — Best of the Best Newcomer	Nominated
2010	The S.I.G.I.T	Indonesia Cutting Edge Music Awards — Favorite Band/Group/Duo	Nominated
2010	Hertz Dyslexia	Indonesia Cutting Edge Music Awards — Favorite Artwork from Album	Nominated
2010	"Money Making"	Indonesia Cutting Edge Music Awards — Favorite Rock Song	Won
2014	The S.I.G.I.T	Indonesia Cutting Edge Music Awards — Most Favorite Band/Group/Duo	Nominated
2014	“Let the Right One In”	Indonesia Cutting Edge Music Awards — Best Rock Track	Nominated
2014	“Let the Right One In”	Indonesia Cutting Edge Music Awards — Most Favorite Track ICEMA 2014	Nominated
2016	The S.I.G.I.T	Cherry Awards — Best International Act	Nominated
