= Čop =

Čop may refer to:

- Čop, Ukraine
- Čop (surname)
