= How Does It End =

Studio album by Tim Steward
- Released: 2006
- Genre: Rock
- Label: Reverberation

How Does It End is an album by Australian singer/songwriter Tim Steward. It won Best Album of 2006 from Fasterlouder.com.au.

== Track listing ==
1. before
2. not the same
3. remember what came first
4. law for yourself
5. the sun is beginning to rise
6. maybe
7. what are you doing to me?
8. i can't wait that long
9. the difference
10. sign from a star
11. Sunday morning

== Sources ==
- Tim Steward Album
