= The Bamboos (rock band) =

Western Australian musical group

- Origin: Collie, Western Australia, Australia
- Genres: Swamp rock, alternative rock
- Years active: 1984–1987
- Labels: Citadel, Cleopatra
- Past members: Tony Chiallella; Mark Gelmi; Craig Hallsworth; Greg Hitchcock; Russell Hopkinson; Shakir Pichler; Roger Russell

The Bamboos were an Australian swamp and alternative rock band from Collie, Western Australia which formed in 1984 by mainstays Mark Gelmi on bass guitar and Craig Hallsworth on guitar and vocals. They relocated to Perth by the following year and were joined by Greg Hitchcock (ex-The Go-Starts, Graverobbers) on guitar, and by Shakir Pichler (ex-The Kryptonics) on drums in 1986 who was replaced by Russell Hopkinson in the next year. The Bamboos released an album, Rarer than Rockinghorse Shit and an EP, Born Killer, before they disbanded in late 1987.

== History ==
The Bamboos were formed in 1984 in the West Australian rural town of Collie, which is 213 kilometres (132 mi) south of Perth. The line-up was Tony Chiallella on drums; Mark Gelmi on bass guitar; Craig Hallsworth on guitar and vocals; and Roger Russell on guitar. By 1985 they had relocated to the capital where Russell was replaced by Greg Hitchcock (ex-The Go-Starts, Graverobbers) on guitar. This line-up recorded three tracks for a 6× extended play box set, Cooking with George – Mark Too, with Ian Davis producing at Australian Broadcasting Corporation Studio 621 in Perth.

In 1986 Chiallella was replaced by Shakir Pichler (ex-The Kryptonics) on drums. According to Australian musicologist, Ian McFarlane, the group performed "raw guitar trash and country-swamp rock [which] caught the attention of Citadel Records boss John Needham". In September they released a single, "Snuff", on Citadel. A cassette album, Rarer Than Rockinghorse Shit, followed on Cleopatra Records in the same year. Another single, "Dead Girl", was succeeded in May next year by a six-track EP, Born Killer, on Citadel.

After two national tours Pichler left to form his own rockabilly band, The Howlin MoonDoggies who he also managed and produced 3 albums, 2 music videos and appeared on 6 international Rockabilly compilations, and was replaced by Russell Hopkinson (ex-Vicious Circle). They issued their final single, "With Which to Love You", in October 1987 and then disbanded. During their career The Bamboos supported Lime Spiders, Johnny Thunders, The Dammed, Nick Cave and the Bad Seeds, The Johnnys, Hoodoo Gurus, Violent Femmes and The Cramps.

== Aftermath ==
After disbanding ex-members of The Bamboos joined other groups. Hallsworth formed The Healers, Wild Palms, Zuvuya, Outstation, Tangled Star and The Slow Beings. In 2016 Craig released a solo album - What's The Story With This Hole? through Hidden Shoal. This is available for digital download. In 2019/20 Craig reunited with Jim Butterworth on bass (The Healers, Outstation, Zuvuya, Wild Palms and Tangled Star) and they enlisted Michael Newman on drums to form Magnets Have Souls. In 2024 Magnets Have Souls released their debut album, Evidence, which is available on all streaming platforms. They are currently working on a second album. Hitchcock has been associated with The Neptunes, The Kryptonics, New Christs, The Verys, Challenger 7, You Am I, The Dearhunters, and The Monarchs. Hopkinson joined Nursery Crimes and then You Am I. Hopkinson has also worked with Australian punk act, Radio Birdman, and managed a record label and distribution company, Reverberation Records from 2003 to August 2007, when it was taken over by Fuse Music Group. Pichler formed The Howlin MoonDoggies, Fink, Brutal Pancho and toured with Amphetish and United States band, Wish You Weres. Pichler also established his own label, Sexbeat Records, and appeared in feature films, Mission: Impossible 2, Ghost Rider, On Our Selection, Fat Pizza: The Movie,Jasper Jones; and a TV series, Nightmares and Dreamscapes: From the Stories of Stephen King. Recently he appeared in the Disney series Last Days of the Space Age as both action vehicle coordinator and stunt double for Iain Glen.

== Members ==
- Tony Chiallella – drums (1984–86)
- Mark Gelmi – bass (1984–87)
- Craig Hallsworth – guitar, vocals (1984–87)
- Greg Hitchcock – vocals, guitar (1985–87)
- Russell Hopkinson – drums (1986–87)
- Shakir Pichler – drums (1986)
- Roger Russell – guitar (1984–85)

== Discography ==
=== Albums ===
List of albums, with selected chart positions
Title	Album details	Peak chart positions
Title	Album details	AUS
Bamboos & Mutants of Desire (with Mutants of Desire)	Released: 1985; Format: CS; Label: The Bamboos	-
Born Killer	Released: June 1987; Format: mini-LP, CS; Label: Citadel Records (CITLP 506)	94
Rarer Than Rockinghorse Shit	Released: 1987; Format: LP, CS; Label: Cleopatra (CLP227)	-
