= Spilt Sauce (EP) =

EP by You Am I
- Released: 22 April 2016
- Recorded: 2015
- Genre: Alternative
- Length: 10:08
- Label: You Am I Set
- Producer: You Am I

You Am I chronology
Porridge & Hotsauce (2015)	Spilt Sauce (2016)	The Lives of Others (2021)

Spilt Sauce is the sixth EP released by You Am I, on 22 April 2016. This limited edition 7-inch EP is a collection of three studio outtakes from the band's recording session for the album "Porridge & Hotsauce". It was released at the same time as a red vinyl edition of Porridge and Hotsauce.

== Track listing ==
All songs: Rogers/You Am I

1. "Aubade"
2. "Til It Was My Tyme"
3. "Airport Lounge"

== Personnel ==
- Tim Rogers - vocals, guitar
- David Lane - guitar
- Andy Kent - bass guitar, backing vocals
- Rusty Hopkinson - drums
