= In the Raw =

In the Raw may refer to:

- In the Raw (Jaya album), 1997
- In the Raw (Tarja album), 2019
- In the Raw (film), a 2009 documentary film
- "In the Raw" (song), a song by Crashdïet
