= The Lives of Others (disambiguation) =

The Lives of Others is a 2006 German film directed by Florian Henckel von Donnersmarck.

The Lives of Others may also refer to:

- The Lives of Others (novel), a 2014 novel by Neel Mukherjee
- "The Lives of Others" (Castle), a 2013 episode of the television show, Castle
- The Lives of Others (album), a 2021 album by You Am I
