= You Am I (album) =

Studio album by You Am I
- Released: 8 October 2010
- Recorded: 2010
- Genre: Rock
- Length: 42 minutes
- Label: Other Tongues
- Producer: Greg Wales

You Am I chronology
Dilettantes (2008)	You Am I (2010)	Porridge & Hotsauce (2015)

You Am I is the ninth studio album by the Australian rock band You Am I, released on 8 October 2010.

The first single "Shuck" premiered on Triple J radio on 17 August and was also released as a downloadable single. The band departed from the major label Virgin Records after the release of their 2008 album Dilettantes; thus, You Am I became the band's first (and only) album on the independent label Other Tongues. On 17 October, the album debuted at a peak position of No. 18 on the ARIA Albums Chart. You Am I ultimately became the band's lowest charting album since their debut album in 1993, although its successor in 2015, Porridge & Hotsauce, charted at No. 20.

== Track listing ==
1. "We Hardly Knew You" – 3:45
2. "Kicking the Balustrade" – 3:35
3. "Lie and Face the Sun" – 2:54
4. "The Good Ones" – 3:57
5. "Shuck" – 4:28
6. "Crime" – 4:38
7. "The Ocean" – 4:28
8. "Pinpricks" – 2:14
9. "Waiting to Be Found Out" – 3:52
10. "Trigger Finger" – 3:35
11. "Let's Not Get Famous" – 4:46

(all songs written by Tim Rogers)

== Personnel ==
- Tim Rogers – guitars, vocals
- Davey Lane – guitars, backing vocals, keys
- Andy Kent – bass guitar, backing vocals
- Rusty Hopkinson – drums, backing vocals
- Megan Washington – backing vocals
- Lanie Lane – backing vocals
- Stevie Hesketh – Keyboard, Piano

== Charts ==
Chart (2010)	Peak position
Australian Albums (ARIA)	18
