= Brett Ford =

Australian rock musician (1959–2007)

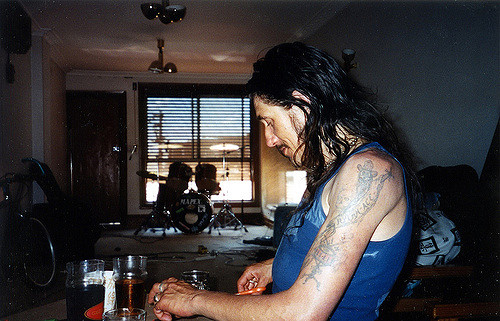

Background information
- Birth name: Brett Taylor Ford
- Also known as: Rhythm Ace
- Born: 30 December 1959; Melbourne, Victoria, Australia
- Died: 21 July 2007 (aged 47)
- Genres: Rock
- Occupation: Musician
- Instruments: Drums; guitar; harmonica
- Years active: 1983–2007
- Formerly of: Exhibit A; Rockafellas; Kansas City Killers; Kryptonics; Lubricated Goat; X; The Brett T. Ford Clinic

Brett Taylor Ford (30 December 1959 – 21 July 2007) was an Australian rock music drummer and songwriter.

Ford was a founder of noise rockers, Lubricated Goat (1986–89) in Perth. During the 1980s Ford played in many different bands, including the Kryptonics (1986–87) and X (with Ian Rilen of Rose Tattoo). In 1987 Ford and his then-wife, Melanie Greensmith, established a rock couture fashion label, Wheels and Doll Baby.

According to Ford's family, he died in 2007 from cardiac arrest.

== Biography ==
Brett Ford was born in 1959 and was raised in Melbourne. He was a member of different groups, Exhibit A, Rockafellas and Kansas City Killers. Ford was in Perth when he joined the Kryptonics on drums in mid-1986 alongside Peter Hartley on guitar (ex-Rockafellas, X-Offenders, Lavender Disaster), Ian Underwood on guitar and vocals and Cathy Webb on bass guitar. That line-up released the group's second single, "Land That Time Forgot" (January 1987), and third single, "Cyclops", before breaking up in mid-1987.

In September 1986 his former bandmate from Exhibit A, Stu Spasm (also ex-Zulu Rattle, Salamander Jim, Beasts of Bourbon, James Baker Experience, Death in Vegas, Hot Property), invited Ford and Hartley to record material as Lubricated Goat, while they were still members of Kryptonics. Their five tracks were included with four more that Spasm had recorded with Martin Bland in Adelaide, as the noise rock group's first album, Plays the Devil's Music (July 1987). Ford co-wrote the tracks, "Guttersnipe" and "Nerve Quake", with Hartley and Spasm.

Guy Maddison (ex-Greenhouse Effect) joined on bass guitar and the group released their second album, Paddock of Love (July 1988). Besides drums Ford provided harmonica, backing vocals and song writing. One of the tracks, "In the Raw", co-written by Ford and Spasm, was performed in November 1988 on Australian Broadcasting Corporation's TV series, Blah Blah Blah. The members appeared in the nude while lip-syncing to the track as the episode dealt with censorship.

Ford formed the Punjabbers in Sydney in 1988 with Roddy Radalj on guitar and vocals (ex-Exterminators, the Scientists, Rockets, Le Hoodoo Gurus, Johnnys, Love Rodeo, James Baker Experience, Dubrovniks), Tony Robertson on bass guitar (ex-Hitmen, New Christs, Naked Lunch) and Tony Thewlis on guitar (ex-Scientists). They issued a single, "Rock 'n' Roll Love Letter", on Timberyard Records in December. Radalj left and the group broke up.

In 1990 Ford joined Rattlesnake Shake, a garage rock group. The line-up included Steve Beves on guitar (ex-Melting Skyscrapers, Naked Lunch), Tony Gibson on guitar (ex-ME 262, Decline of the Reptiles), Andy Newman on bass guitar (ex-Trans 262, Howling Commandos) and Peter Patterson on vocals (ex-Melting Skyscrapers, Naked Lunch). They issued a self-titled EP in August on Rattlesnake Records, in March 1991 they changed their name to Dark Carnival and then to Thrill Killers a month later. Ford left soon after.
