= Psychedelicatessen =

Psychedelicatessen may refer to:

- Psychedelicatessen (Lubricated Goat album), 1990
- Psychedelicatessen (Moodswings album), 1997
- Psychedelicatessen (Threshold album), 1994
