= Reverberation (disambiguation) =

Reverberation is a persistence of sound after it is produced.

Reverberation may also refer to:

- "Reverberation (Doubt)", a 1966 song by The 13th Floor Elevators covered by Echo & the Bunnymen in 1990
- Reverberation (album), by Echo & the Bunnymen, 1990
- Reverberation (record label)
- Reverber/ation, a volume of The Early Years 1965–1972 by Pink Floyd

== See also ==
- Reverb (disambiguation)
