= Cops (EP) =

EP by The Cops
- Released: 27 August 2004 (Australia)
- Genre: Indie rock
- Length: 9:11
- Label: Love Police Records/Reverberation
- Producer: Paul McKercher; Greg Calbi

The Cops chronology
Cops (2004)	Stomp On Tripwires (2004)

This self-titled EP is the debut release by The Cops. Released in 2004, this 5-track EP introduced the band's raw, energetic sound that would later define their full-length albums.

== Critical reception ==
The EP received positive reviews from Australian music press, praising its "ferocious garage-punk energy and biting social commentary". The release helped establish The Cops as part of Australia's burgeoning punk revival scene in the early 2000s.

== Track listing ==
1. "The Shake" – 2:14
2. "Rectify" – 3:18
3. "Identify" – 2:50
4. "Treat You Like A Dog" – 1:29
