= Ozzie Wright =

Australian surfer, artist, filmmaker, and musician

Personal information
- Nickname: Ozzy Wrong
- Born: 1 July 1976; Australia
- Height: 6 ft (183 cm)
- Weight: 80 Kilos

Surfing career
- Sponsors: Volcom, Electric, Santa Cruz, Gorilla Grip
- Website: https://ozzywrong.com

Ozzie Wright (born 1 July 1976) is an Australian professional surfer, painter, and musician.

He is sponsored by Volcom and Santa Cruz surfboards. His artwork has been featured on Volcom clothing, and he was a character in the cartoon The Dawn of the Stone Age, which was part of a Volcom marketing campaign.

He is a member of the punk rock band Goons of Doom, and in 2013 he released the album Mylee Grace And Ozzy Wrong Songs with his wife Mylee Grace.

His artwork has been shown in Australia, France, England, Switzerland, Japan, USA, and Indonesia. It has been included on surfboards, album covers, and clothing. In 2021 was featured on a box from Louis Vuitton.
