= Dilettantes (album) =

Studio album by You Am I
- Released: 13 September 2008
- Recorded: 2008
- Genre: Rock
- Label: Virgin Records
- Producer: Greg Wales

You Am I chronology
Convicts (2006)	Dilettantes (2008)	You Am I (2010)

Dilettantes is the eighth studio album by the Australian rock band You Am I, released on 13 September 2008. It was recorded at Electric Avenue Studios in Sydney and Sing Sing South in Melbourne before being mixed at Studios 301 in Sydney. The first single, "Erasmus", was premiered on Triple J radio on Dools & Linda's show on 6 August, and was released on iTunes along with the album's title track as a downloadable single on 6 September. Video clips were released in November for "Beau Geste" and "Givin' Up And Gettin Fat" to be released as radio/iTunes singles.

The title track, "Dilettantes", was previewed as streaming audio on The Vine from 30 July 2008.

The iTunes Plus release includes a bonus video of live footage from a 1998 gig at the Budokan, supporting Soundgarden, on the #4 Record tour.

Songwriter Tim Rogers said of the album, "I think I'm as proud of that as I am of anything we've ever done."

== Track listing ==
1. "Dilettantes" – 4:25
2. "Disappearing" – 4:58
3. "Beau Geste" – 3:11
4. "Frightfully Moderne" – 3:11
5. "Wankers" – 4:46
6. "The Big Wheel" – 2:41
7. "The Boy's Angry at the Water" – 4:02
8. "Givin' Up and Gettin Fat" – 4:17
9. "Erasmus (song)|Erasmus" – 3:28
10. "Davey's Gone Green Again" – 3:30
11. "Jolly's First Time Around The Sun" – 4:36
12. "The Piano Up The Tree" – 7:09

(all songs written by Tim Rogers)

=== iTunes Plus bonus track ===
1. "Live at the Budokan" (video) – 18:25

== Personnel ==
- Tim Rogers – guitars, vocals
- Davey Lane – guitars, backing vocals, keys
- Andy Kent – bass guitar, backing vocals
- Rusty Hopkinson – drums, backing vocals
- Mel Robinson – string arrangements
- Mel Robinson, Zoe Black, Rebecca Chan, James Munro – strings
- James Dixon – Korg MS20
- Greg Wales – producer/engineer

== Charts ==
Chart (2008)	Peak position
Australian Albums (ARIA)	12
