= Tim Steward =

Australian musician (born 1966)

- Born: Timothy John Steward; 20 August 1966; London, United Kingdom
- Origin: Brisbane, Queensland, Australia
- Genres: Indie rock, indie pop, punk, acoustic
- Occupations: Singer-songwriter, producer, Guitarist
- Instruments: Vocals, piano, guitar, bass guitar
- Years active: 1987–present
- Website: Tim's page on the official Screamfeeder website

Tim Steward is a musician, singer, and songwriter from Brisbane, Australia. Steward was born in the United Kingdom and moved to Townsville, Australia in 1983, and Brisbane in 1989. Steward is most well known for his work in band Screamfeeder which formed in 1991, of which he is the singer, guitarist and principal songwriter.

He is also currently performing in Brisbane band We All Want To, who have released three critically acclaimed albums.

In 2006, Steward released his first solo studio album under Reverberation entitled How Does It End. Other bands/projects he has been involved with include Psycho Skate Smurfs on Smack, Lethal Injections, The Madmen and The Whats. He also played a role in promoting other Brisbane indie artists in the 90s through his record label Stone Groove.

== Discography ==
=== Tim Steward studio albums ===
- How Does it End (2006)

=== Screamfeeder studio albums ===
- Flour (album) (1992)
- Burn Out Your Name (1993)
- Fill Yourself With Music (1995)
- Kitten Licks (1996)
- Rocks on the Soul (2000)
- Take You Apart (2003)
- Pop Guilt (2017)

=== Screamfeeder EPs ===
- Felicitator (1994)
- Closing Alaska (1997)
- Home Age (1999)
- Delusions Of Grandchildren (2005)

=== Screamfeeder singles ===
- Fingers and Toes (1993)
- Fill Yourself With Music (1995)
- Who's Counting?/Sweet Little Oranges (1995)
- Dart (1996)
- Static (1996)
- Gravity (1996)
- Triple Hook (1998)
- Hi Cs (1998)
- Above The Dove (2000)
- Stopless (2000)
- Mr Tuba (2001)
- Ice Patrol (2003)
- 12345 (2003)
- I Don't Know What To Do Any More (2003)
- Bunny (2004)
- Alone in a Crowd (2015)
- All Over It Again (2016)
- Karen Trust Me (2016)

=== Compilations ===
- Seven Year Glitch (1996) A collection of live recordings, rarities, non-album tracks and pre-Screamfeeder songs.
- Introducing: Screamfeeder (2004) A collection of singles and almost singles.
- Cargo Embargo (B Sides & More) (2011) – digital release only, A collection of all the band's b sides and selected songs which appeared on non-Australian versions of albums.

=== Live Releases ===
- Live at The Zoo, Brisbane, March 2013
- Live at Woodland, December 2011
- Great Northern Hotel, Byron Bay, 13/1/98
- The Corner, Melbourne, 9/1/98
- Tim & Kellie Live in the Library, Singapore
- Tim and Kellie Live at The Zoo, 2001
- Tim Plays Solo 2002

=== We All Want To studio albums ===
- We All Want To (2010)
- Come Up Invisible (2012)
- The Haze (2015)

=== We All Want To EPs ===
- Back to the Car (2009)
- No Signs (2013)
- Sally Can't See (2013)(US promo EP)

=== The Whats ===
- All Mouth No Trousers LP
- A Bit Of Everything with The Whats EP

=== The Madmen ===
- Almost Past Caring Single
- Tower Single
- Cool Kinda Kid Single
- Thunder Egg EP

== Awards ==
- Tim Steward's solo studio album How Does it End was cited as Best Album of 2006 on Fasterlouder.com.au.
- Tim also won the Skinny's/Rockinghorse Alternative Award and Ellaway's Song of the Year for the song "Not the Same" in the 2007 Q Song Awards.
- In 2012 Steward was recognised with a star on the Brunswick Street Mall ‘Walk of Fame’ honouring Queensland's finest and most accomplished musicians.
- The second We All Want To album (Come Up Invisible) was included in the AMP Long List and selected as a finalist for the Q Song Album of the Year in August 2013.
- Tim was awarded the Grant McLennan Fellowship in 2015, traveling to the UK in 2016 to spend a month songwriting. The songs written there appeared on Screamfeeder's Pop Guilt, and will appear on future WE ALL WANT TO releases.
