= Reverb (disambiguation) =

Reverb, or reverberation, is the persistence of sound after the sound is produced.

Reverb may also refer to:

- Reverb effect, an audio effect to simulate reverberation
- Reverb (non-profit), an environmental organization
- Reverb (TV series), a weekly American series
- Reverb.com, an online marketplace for musical dequipment
- Reverb (DC Comics), a comic book character

== See also ==
- Reverberation (disambiguation)
