= Pre.shrunk =

Australian rock band

pre.shrunk
- Origin: Melbourne, Victoria, Australia
- Genre: Rock
- Years active: 1996–2004
- Labels: Production Workshop; Redcap/Shock; Black Yak/Phantom; MGM
- Past members: Justin Dwyer; Dave Morris; Davarj "Davage" Thomas
- Website: preshrunk.com

pre.shrunk were an Australian rock band, which formed in March 1996 with two bass guitarists, Dave Morris and David "Davarj"/"Davage" Thomas (ex-Nursery Crimes), and a drummer, Justin Dwyer. At the ARIA Music Awards of 1999 they were nominated in the Best Independent Release category for their single, "Triple A Side" (1998). In 2001 they were nominated in the same category for their debut album, Digital Sunset (2000). Thomas left in 2003 and the group continued until late the following year as a duo.

== History ==
=== 1996-1999: Formation and early EPs ===
pre.shrunk were formed in Melbourne in March 1996 as a rock trio with Justin Dwyer on drums and vocals, Dave Morris (ex-Housequake) on bass guitar and vocals, and David "Davarj"/"Davage" Thomas (ex-Nursery Crimes) on bass guitar and vocals. Dwyer had started his musical career at age 12 in a group, Liquid Crystal, "We rented out a local hall and went for it. I remember my dad dropping some dry ice into water with welding gloves on. Rock at its best." Morris' earlier band, Housequake, was a "Newcastle funk group" from the late 1980s while Thomas "came from a punk background, which resulted in a 'melding of styles'."

In March 1997 the group released a five-track extended play, Exhibit [A] via Production Workshop. They followed with another EP, Sudden Blinding Certainty, in November 1997, which has seven tracks, on Redcap Records. Playing tracks from the EP the trio were broadcast on Australian Broadcasting Corporation (ABC) music TV show, Recovery, and on national youth radio station, Triple J's Live at the Wireless.

Giordana of 4ZZZ caught a gig in Adelaide and heard the live version of their track, "Accelerate", from the latter EP: "About 15 minutes later I was bamboozled as they were still pumping out one of the most futuristic hypnotic funk inspired tracks I have heard to this day." At the ARIA Music Awards of 1999 they were nominated in the Best Independent Release category for their EP Triple A Side.

The group's fourth EP, Sub Chakra was released in August 1999. The Post's reviewer described the EP's genres: "we're going with rock, even though this all-instrumental sojourn takes us through trance dance, edgy power groove and what the band describes as 'the sub-sonic heartbeat'." The group supported Silverchair on a national tour to promote Sub Chakra. They followed with a co-headlining national tour, Turn Up Your Radio, alongside Motor Ace, Nitocris and Weta in August–September 1999.

=== 2000-2004: Digital Sunrise, Bestseller and disbandment ===
pre.shrunk's debut studio album, Digital Sunrise, was released in 2000. It was co-produced by the group with Peter "Reggie" Bowman (Southern Sons). At the ARIA Music Awards of 2001 they received their another Best Independent Release nomination for the album.

Their second studio album, Bestseller was released in January 2003, was recorded in August to September 2002 at Scream Louder Studios, Warrandyte, co-produced again by the trio with Bowman. Morris explained to Tiffany Bakker of The Sydney Morning Herald in October 2003, "A lot of our new stuff is coming through jam sessions, which is totally different to how we've worked before. In the past, it's been a much more disjointed process, where we all worked individually. But this is working out really well."

During 2004 pre-shrunk continued as a duo of Dwyer and Morris, plans for a third studio album fell through according to Dwyer, "Dave and I have decided not to do a third 'Shrunk album at this time. We have a bunch of songs on the demo board and plan to work together in the future, but Dave is going to live in Bangkok in a couple of months, whilst me an the family are going to go and live in Istanbul around July, which doesn't give us the time to finish, print and tour a CD properly. Preshrunk are going on an open ended holiday."

=== 2005-present: Post-Shrunk ===
In 2012 Davarj Thomas joined Australian band, the Nerve, alongside Ezekiel Ox (ex-Mammal) on vocals, Lucius Borich (ex-Cog, Juice) on drums and lead guitarist, Glenn Proudfoot. Their work is produced by Bowman who recommended Thomas to the rest of the group; Borich also recalled seeing pre.shrunk's "two bass players and them both being fantastic, and there being a lot of experimental electronica meets beats meets psy-trance but really heavy, and I thought it was great."

== Members ==
- Justin Dwyer (drums, vocals)
- Dave Morris (bass, vocals)
- David "Davarj"/"Davage" Thomas (bass, vocals)

== Discography ==
=== Albums ===
| Title | Album details |
|---|---|
| Digital Sunrise | Released: 2000; Label: Black Yak (BYOA14); Format: CD |
| Bestseller | Released: January 2003; Label: Black Yak (BYOA28); Format: CD |

=== Extended plays ===
| Title | EP details |
|---|---|
| Exhibit [A] | Released: March 1997; Label: Production Workshop (Pre-Shrunk 001); Format: CD |
| Sudden Blinding Certainty | Released: November 1997; Label: Redcap Records (RCAP001); Format: CD |
| Triple A Side | Released: 1998; Label: Black Yak Phantom(BYOE11); Format: CD |
| Sub Chakra | Released: August 1999; Label: Black Yak (BYOE12); Format: CD |
| Hot Robots | Released: 2000; Label: Black Yak (BYOE13); Format: CD |

== Awards and nominations ==
=== ARIA Music Awards ===
The ARIA Music Awards are a set of annual ceremonies presented by Australian Recording Industry Association (ARIA), which recognise excellence, innovation, and achievement across all genres of the music of Australia. They commenced in 1987.

| Year | Nominee / work | Award | Result | Ref. |
|---|---|---|---|---|
| 1999 | Triple A Side | Best Independent Release | Nominated | |
| 2001 | Digital Sunrise | Best Independent Release | Nominated | |
