= Stu Spasm =

Australian noise rock musician

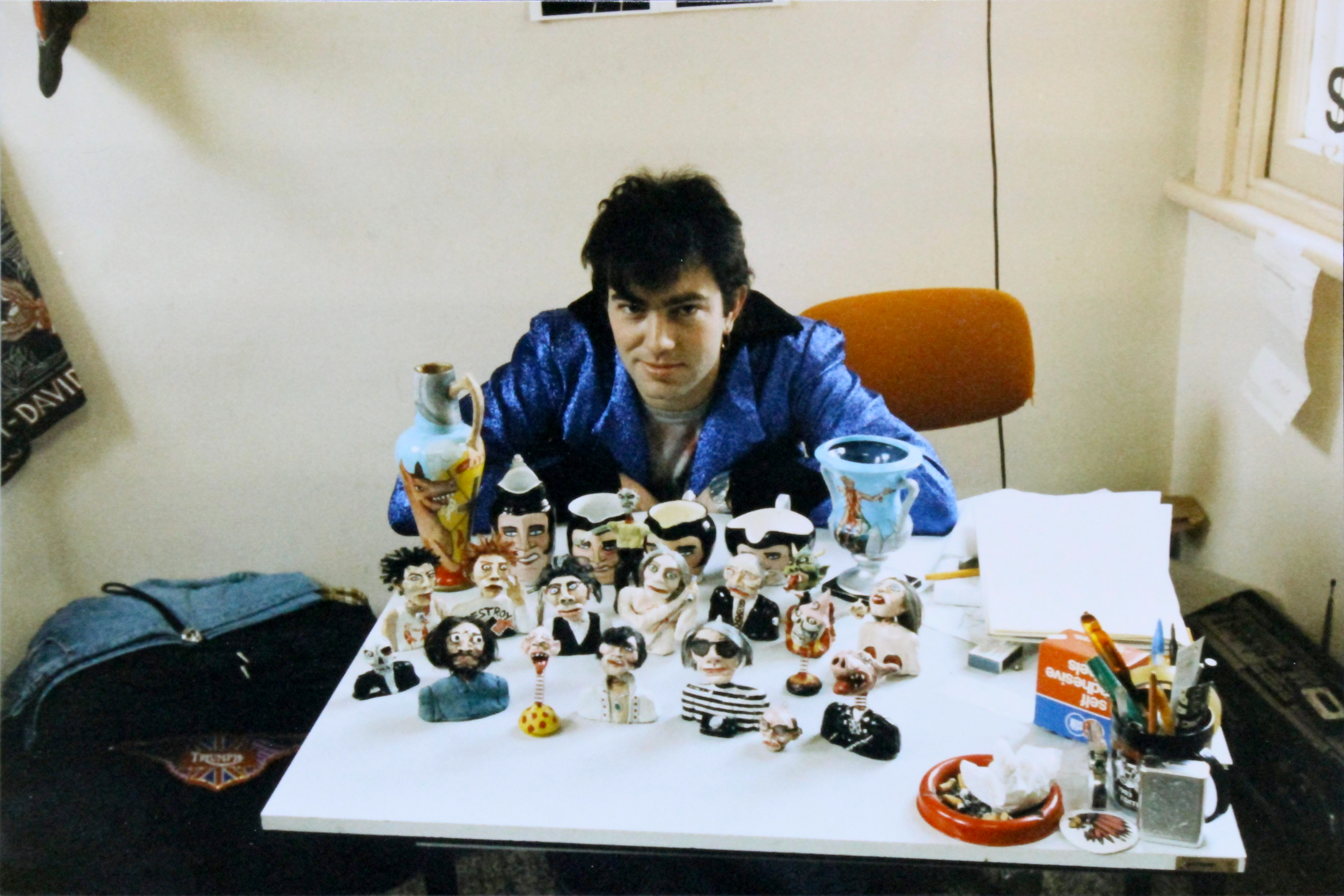
- Stu Spasm in Perth in 1986

Background information
- Born: Stuart Gray; 1961 (age 64–65); Australia
- Genres: Noise rock
- Occupation: Musician
- Instruments: Vocals, guitar, bass guitar, piano, synthesizer, sampler, tympani
- Years active: 1985–present
- Labels: Amphetamine Reptile, Black Eye

Stuart Gray (born 1961), better known by his moniker Stu Spasm, is an Australian musician and composer best recognized as the frontman for the experimental noise rock outfit Lubricated Goat.

== Biography ==
Spasm (Gray) commenced his musical journey in Adelaide, South Australia. A devotee of Adelaide's bourgeoning Punk scene, Spasm worked hard on his guitar playing, developing a New York Dolls/Johnny Thunders repertoire.

His first band named Exhibit A played primarily covers sourced from the Dolls, MC5, Birdman and other east coast US artists.

Stu Spasm joined the band Salamander Jim, who had already been active since the early eighties, to record their 1985 debut album Lorne Green Shares His Precious Fluids. Spasm soon left the group to pursue his own musical interests and formed Lubricated Goat in Perth in 1986.

In addition to himself, the line-up included former Salamander Jim drummer Martin Bland and ex-Kryptonics members Brett Ford and Pete Hartley. John Foy, founder of the Sydney-based label Red Eye Records, was so impressed by Lubricated Goat's music and antics that he created Black Eye Records for the band to issue their records through. Spasm became the group's principal songwriter and penned the majority of their oeuvre.

In 1990, while touring Europe to promote Psychedelicatessen, Spasm was stabbed (by Arab heroin dealers in a "transaction gone wrong") in Berlin. He put the band on hiatus and moved to New York where he met and began a relationship with Kat Bjelland of Babes in Toyland. They married in 1992 and began composing songs together. During this time Spasm began recording under the name Lubricated Goat with an entirely different line-up and recorded the material that would comprise Forces You Don't Understand. Along with drummer Russell Simins of The Blues Explosion, Bjelland and Spasm formed Crunt and released a self-titled album in 1994. The group was short lived however, as Bjelland and Spasm divorced in January 1995.

Spasm continued to play under the Lubricated Goat moniker with members such as Rich Hutchins of Live Skull and Jack Natz of Cop Shoot Cop.

In February 2015 he formed a new outfit, The Art Gray Noizz Quintet, with Hutchins, Skeleton Boy (formerly of Woman) on bass, Andrea Sicco (of Twin Guns) on guitar, Nikki D'Agostino on saxophone, and Nicholas John Stevens on trombone. Grace Bergere and Ty Varesi would eventually succeed Sicco in the rotating second guitar slot. The band was originally put together to perform a one-off at an afterparty for the New York premiere of The Color of Noise, a documentary on Minneapolis Noise Rock label Amphetamine Reptile, as Spasm was heavily featured in the film. A live recording documenting the group performing one of the last shows before pandemic lockdown restrictions shut New York City was released on Primitive Screwhead Tapes in 2021. The group released their debut self-titled LP on Bang! Records in May 2022, and continues on.

2024 saw the release of a feature-length documentary on the life and times of Spasm entitled "I Should Have Been Dead Years Ago", directed by Jason Axel Summers, who had previously made "Unknown Passage: The Dead Moon Story". The film premiered to a sold-out crowd for the DocNRoll Film Festival in Brooklyn on 7 May 2024 and has been described as "featuring archival footage, photos, interviews, Gray’s sculptures and paintings, live performance footage including Gray’s current band, The Art Gray Noizz Quintet." The Australian premiere was 7 July 2024 at the Revelation International Film Festival in Perth.

In 2026, The Art Gray Noizz Quintet was picked up by In The Red Records, who released a 10-inch single collaboration with Lydia Lunch, featuring covers of "Permafrost" by Magazine and "Mass Production" by Iggy Pop.

== Discography ==
=== Salamander Jim ===
Year	Title
1985	Lorne Green Shares His Precious Fluids

=== Lubricated Goat ===
Year	Title
1987	Plays The Devil's Music
1988	Paddock of Love
1990	Psychedelicatessen
1994	Forces You Don't Understand

=== Crunt ===
Year	Title
1994	Crunt

=== The Art Gray Noizz Quintet ===
Year	Title
2021	Live! Friday March 13, 2020
2022	The Art Gray Noizz Quintet
2024	Relief
