= The Lives of Others (album) =

Studio album by You Am I
- Released: 14 May 2021
- Recorded: Melbourne and Sydney
- Genre: Alternative rock
- Length: 46:26
- Label: Independiente
- Producer: You Am I

You Am I chronology
Spilt Sauce (2016)	The Lives of Others (2021)

The Lives of Others
Review scores
Source	Rating
Rolling Stone	4/5 stars
The Music	4/5 stars
Newcastle Herald	3.5/5 stars
Sydney Morning Herald	3.5/5 stars

The Lives of Others is the eleventh studio album by the Australian rock band You Am I. It was released on 14 May 2021.

Due to the COVID-19 pandemic in Australia, lead vocalist Tim Rogers and guitarist/backup vocalist Davey Lane worked on demo tapes in Melbourne, before sending them to bassist Andy Kent and drummer Rusty Hopkinson, who both live in Sydney. The Lives of Others became the band's most commercially successful album in over two decades, as the album peaked at No. 2 on the ARIA Albums Chart (their highest position since 1998's #4 Record peaked at No. 1).

== Track listing ==
1. "The Waterboy"
2. "The Third Level"
3. "Rosedale Redux"
4. "Manliness"
5. "DRB Hudson"
6. "We All Went Deaf Overnight"
7. "Rubbish Day"
8. "Readers' Comments"
9. "I'm My Whole World Tonight"
10. "Lookalikes"
11. "Woulda Been Me"
12. "The Lives of Others"

== Charts ==
Chart (2021)	Peak position
Australian Albums (ARIA)	2
