= Visible Idea of Perfection =

Studio album by The S.I.G.I.T.
- Released: December 2007
- Recorded: Massive Studio, Bandung
- Genre: Hard rock, blues rock, garage rock
- Length: 42:00
- Label: FFWD Records, Caveman!

The S.I.G.I.T. chronology
Visible Idea of Perfection (2007)	Detourn (2013)

Professional ratings
Review scores
Source	Rating
Deathrockstar	8.1/10
Supersonic Sounds	Positive

Visible Idea of Perfection is a debut album by the Indonesian hard rock band, The S.I.G.I.T. It was released in 2006 in Indonesia by FFWD Records; in 2007 in Australia by Caveman! Records.

This record includes its most popular track "Black Amplifier," and fans-favorite love ballad "All the Time."

== Track listing ==
All tracks written and composed by The S.I.G.I.T.

1. "Black Amplifier" 2:36
2. "Horse" 2:06
3. "No Hook" 2:42
4. "New Generation" 2:59
5. "Nowhere End" 3:46
6. "Live in New York" 2:32
7. "Clove Doper" 2:44
8. "Soul Sister" 3:49
9. "Save Me" 2:41
10. "Let It Go" 3:45
11. "All the Time" 3:18
12. "Alright" 2:32
13. Satan State" 3:33
14. "Provocateur" (Bonus track) 2:05
