= Screamfeeder =

Australian indie guitar pop group

- Origin: Brisbane, Queensland, Australia
- Genres: Australian rock; indie guitar pop; alternative rock
- Years active: 1991–present
- Labels: Survival; Hypnotized/Shock, Low Transit Industries; Rhythm Ace; Four Four (ABC)
- Members: Tim Steward; Kellie Lloyd; Darek Mudge; Phil Usher
- Past members: Dean Shwereb; Tony Blades; Mike Squire; Steph Hughes
- Website: screamfeeder.com

Screamfeeder is an Australian indie guitar pop group formed in Brisbane in 1991. The band's original line-up was composed of drummer Tony Blades, bassist/vocalist Kellie Lloyd and vocalist/guitarist Tim Steward. In 1995, Dean Shwereb replaced Blades on drums. Darek Mudge later joined on lead guitar from 2001 to 2005, and eventually rejoined in 2014. Screamfeeder have released eight studio albums: Flour (June 1992), Burn Out Your Name (August 1993), Fill Yourself With Music (1995), Kitten Licks (1996), Rocks on the Soul (2000), Take You Apart (2003), Pop Guilt (2017), and Five Rooms (2022).

== History ==
Screamfeeder were formed in August 1991 in Brisbane. Blades and Steward had previously been members of the Madmen, which formed in 1988 in Townsville with Bruce Gardner on guitar and vocals and Jeff Johnson on bass guitar. In 1989, Cam Hurst replaced Johnson on bass guitar and Gardner left. They released three singles and an extended play, Thunder Egg (1990), on their own label, Stone Groove. The Madmen toured Queensland numerous times, before relocating to Brisbane in 1989. When Hurst was replaced by Lloyd, the trio became Screamfeeder. Lloyd had previously made a filmclip for the Madmen, Tower.

Screamfeeder signed with Sydney-based label Survival Records and issued their debut studio album, Flour, in June 1992. One track, "Walking Through the Village", had been recorded back in June 1990 by the Madmen (with Hurst on bass guitar) at Pyramid Studios, and was co-produced by Steward and Murray Nash. The other tracks were recorded between November 1991 and the following January at Vibrafeel Studios with Mick Borkowski as producer, audio engineer and mastering engineer.

The Canberra Times wrote in January 1993 that Flour "captured the raw sound of Screamfeeder while displaying the inherent depth, feeling and power within the music. Influences within Screamfeeder range from Swervedriver to Hüsker Dü to Bitch Magnet and beyond. The songs on the album forge a path of intense feeling, crossing the ground from sublime melodies to sonic punishment." Flour was later remastered and re-released in 2014 by the Melbourne-based Poison City Records.

Their second album, Burn Out Your Name, was released in August 1993. It provided the single, "Fingers and Toes", in the same month. Pemberton Roach of AllMusic described their sound "it's pretty clear from the album's first song that the group has put in some serious hours listening to Hüsker Dü records. From the ringing distorto guitar to the throat-slashing, top-of-the-range Bob Mould-esque vocals, Screamfeeder has the Minnepolis [sic] trio's sound down better than anyone this side of Overwhelming Colorfast." Screamfeeder toured Europe with Screaming Tribesmen and the Chevelles later that year, and played the Big Day Out for the first time in January 1994. The band would go on to play the festival a further three times in 1997, 1998 and 1999.

In 1995, Dean Shwereb replaced Tony Blades on the drums, and the band toured to promote Fill Yourself With Music and wrote and recorded Kitten Licks. The rest of the 90s saw the band support acts such as Rollins Band, Sonic Youth, Ride and Pavement.

It was announced in January 2022 that drummer Dean Shwereb was stepping away from the band after a 25-year tenure. He was replaced by Phil Usher from Brisbane bands Grand Atlantic, Sacred Shrines and the Far Outs, as well as Sydney's Sounds Like Sunset. The following month, the band announced their first album in five years, Five Rooms, which was released on 6 May 2022.

== Discography ==
=== Studio albums ===
List of studio albums, with selected chart positions
Title	Album details	Peak chart positions
Title	Album details	AUS
Flour	Release date: 1992; Label: Survival (SUR521CD)	—
Burn Out Your Name	Release date: August 1993; Label: Survival (SUR532CD)	146
Fill Yourself with Music	Release date: 1995; Label: The Hypnotized Label (HIP006)	—
Kitten Licks	Release date: September 1996; Label: The Hypnotized Label (HIP016)	101
Rocks on the Soul	Release date: 2000; Label: The Hypnotized Label (HIP040)	—
Take You Apart	Release date: 2003; Label: Rhythm Ace (RA119)	—
Pop Guilt	Release date: 2017; Label: Four Four / ABC Music (5748686)	—
Five Rooms	Release date: 6 May 2022; Label: Modern Morning (MOD006)	—

=== Live albums ===
Title	Album details
Live At The Zoo, Brisbane, March 2013	Release date: September 2013; Label: Screamfeeder
Live in the Library, Singapore July 4th 2002	Release date: September 2013; Label: Screamfeeder
Live at The Great Northern, Byron Bay - Jan 1998	Release date: October 2013; Label: Screamfeeder
Live At The Corner - January 1998	Release date: October 2013; Label: Screamfeeder
Live At Woodland	Release date: November 2013; Label: Screamfeeder; Note: Recorded December 2011
Tim and Kellie Live at The Zoo	Release date: February 2014; Label: Screamfeeder
Tim and Kellie Live at The Zoo	Release date: February 2014; Label: Screamfeeder; Note: Recorded December 2001
Tim Plays Solo 2002	Release date: February 2014; Label: Screamfeeder; Note: Recorded 2002

=== Compilations ===
Title	Album details
Seven Year Glitch	Release date: 1996; Label: The Hypnotized Label (HIP013); Note: A collection of live recordings, rarities, non-album tracks and pre-Screamfeeder songs
Introducing: Screamfeeder. Singles & More 1992-2004	Release date: 2004; Label: Shock (SCREAM1CD); Note: A collection of singles and almost singles
Cargo Embargo (B Sides & More)	Release date: 2011; Label: Screamfeeder; Note: A digital release only, Note: A collection of b-sides and non-Australian versions of albums.
Patterns Form	Release date: 2011; Label: Four Four / ABC Music (6731253); Note: A collection of singles from 1991 to 2017, released for Record Store Day 2018
Demolition Vol 1	Release date: February 2025; Label: Screamfeeder
Demolition Vol 2	Release date: February 2025; Label: Screamfeeder
Demolition Vol 3	Release date: February 2025; Label: Screamfeeder
Demolition Vol 4	Release date: February 2025; Label: Screamfeeder

=== Charting Extended plays / Singles ===
List of extended plays, with selected chart positions within top 200
Title	Album details	Peak chart positions
Title	Album details	AUS
Fingers + Toes	Release date: July 1993; Label: Survival (SUR714)	182
Felicitator	Release date: January 1994; Label: Survival (SUR716)	154
Fill Yourself With Music	Release date: 1994; Label: The Hypnotized Label (HIP004)	189
Who's Counting? / Sweet Little Oranges	Release date: 1995; Label: The Hypnotized Label (HIP007)	192
Dart	Release date: 1996; Label: The Hypnotized Label (HIP015)	138
Static	Release date: 1996; Label: The Hypnotized Label (HIP020)	122
HI-C	Release date: 1998; Label: The Hypnotized Label (HIP032)	173
