= Beau Geste (song) =

Single by You Am I

from the album Dilettantes
- Released: 8 November 2008
- Recorded: 2008
- Genre: Alternative rock
- Length: 3:11
- Label: EMI
- Songwriter(s): Tim Rogers
- Producer(s): Greg Wales

You Am I singles chronology
"Erasmus" (2008)	"Beau Geste" (2008)	"Givin' Up And Gettin Fat" (2009)

"Beau Geste" is the second single from the album Dilettantes by Australian rock band You Am I, their eighth studio album. The track is loosely based on the Beau Geste story, with snippets of French dialog appearing during the instrumental section.

It was released as a download only single on iTunes on 8 November 2008 in three formats – one with just the single, one with a B-side and one with the music video, which is in part a homage to the various film versions of Beau Geste.

== Background ==
Rogers described the song:

"I kept this from the band for a while, superstitious that the way it popped into my head fully formed, give or take, was. like vertigo. The lyric concerns my oft-lapsed need to associate myself with a mentor. That those folks are usually grizzled ex-alcoholics or ex-junkies doesn't keep me from any sleep. The foreign legion looms oddly large in a few tracks. Maybe it's just the uniform."

== Music video ==
The music video takes the shape of the second part of a 2-part story (the first part being the clip for "Givin' Up and Gettin Fat", released after "Beau Geste") set in the 1920s. The clip was filmed in Niddrie, Victoria, doubling for Morocco and showcases the band as members of the Foreign Legion attempting to desert the army.

== Track listing ==
Single version:

1. "Beau Geste" – 3:11

With B-side:

1. "Beau Geste" – 3:11
2. "Let's Be Dreadful" – 2:52

All songs by Tim Rogers.
