= Givin' Up and Gettin Fat =

"Givin' Up And Gettin Fat"

Single by You Am I

from the album Dilettantes
- Released: 17 January 2009
- Recorded: 2008
- Genre: Alternative rock
- Length: 4:17
- Label: EMI
- Songwriter(s): Tim Rogers
- Producer(s): Greg Wales

You Am I singles chronology
"Beau Geste" (2008)	"Givin' Up And Gettin Fat" (2009)

"Givin' Up And Gettin Fat" is the third single from the album Dilettantes by Australian rock band You Am I, their eighth studio album. The accompanying music video acts as a prequel to the band's Beau Geste video, featuring the band in 1920s Marseille.

It was released as a download only single on iTunes on 17 January 2009.

== Track listing ==
1. "Givin' Up And Gettin Fat" – 4:17
2. "Out of Our Tiny Lil' Minds" - 2:50

All songs by Tim Rogers.

== Film clip ==
The film clip for the song forms the first part of a 2-part story (with the second part being the clip for "Beau Geste", released before this clip) set in the 1920s. In this clip the band members feature as four ruffians in Marseille, each getting into trouble and being chased across the city, eventually hiding in the Foreign Legion recruitment office. It ends with the four finding themselves in Morocco and in the Legion, leading into the "Beau Geste" clip. The video is subtitled in French, and was shot in Melbourne. You Am I fan Peter Helliar has a small cameo as a man whose baguette is stolen from him.
