= Lubricated Goat =

Australian noise rock band

- Origin: Sydney, New South Wales, Australia
- Genres: Noise rock, post-punk, garage rock
- Years active: 1986–present
- Labels: Black Eye, Amphetamine Reptile, Sub Pop, Sympathy for the Record Industry, PCP, Reptilian
- Members: Stu Spasm; Jack Natz; Richard Hutchins
- Past members: Brett Ford; Peter Hartley; Martin Bland; Guy Maddison; Peter Read; Charles Tolnay; Gene Revet; Renastair EJ; Lachlan McLeod; Tod Ashley; Tony Lee; Vincent Signorelli; Hayden Millsteed; Ant Migliaccio; Anne Mette Rasmussen; Creighton Chamberlain

Lubricated Goat are an Australian noise rock band which originally formed in 1986 by multi-instrumentalist Stu Spasm. They achieved brief notoriety in November 1988 for appearing nude on the ABC TV program Blah Blah Blah, wearing only their instruments and shoes. Mainly influenced by the Stooges and the Birthday Party, they are credited for playing a grimy, confrontational style of rock, which preceded grunge. They have issued five studio albums, Plays the Devil's Music (1987), Paddock of Love (1988), Psychedelicatessen (1990), Forces You Don't Understand (1994) and The Great Old Ones (2003).

== History ==
Lubricated Goat were formed in Sydney in 1986 by Stu Spasm (real name Stuart Gray) on lead vocals, guitar, synthesiser and bass guitar. Spasm had previously been a member of Exhibit A, Zulu Rattle, Salamander Jim, Beasts of Bourbon, James Baker Experience, Death in Vegas and Hot Property. The original band also included Martin Bland on drums and backing vocals (ex-Head On, Crawling Eye, Acid Drops, Bloodloss, Zulu Rattle, Salamander Jim, Primevils), Brett Ford on drums, and Pete Hartley on bass guitar and guitar (the latter two both formerly of the Kryptonics).

En route to Sydney after a visit to England, Spasm went via Perth to visit former Singing Dog drummer Ford, who was then playing in the Kryptonics with Hartley. While in Perth, Spasm recorded side 1 of the band's debut album, Plays the Devil's Music, at No Sweat Studios with Ford and Hartley. Side 2 was recorded in Adelaide on a 4-track with Bland.

Lubricated Goat signed to Red Eye Records offshoot Black Eye Records, established by John Foy., which released Plays the Devil's Music in July 1987. According to Australian musicologist Ian McFarlane, "For the musicians involved, it was simply a chance to exist on the very edges of the Sydney rock scene, and to play out a sick joke for their own entertainment... Foy... liked the joke and formed the Black Eye label specifically as an outlet for the recorded works of this bunch of noise terrorists".

In Sydney, Spasm recruited bassist Guy Maddison of Perth band the Greenhouse Effect (later a member of Mudhoney), Hartley switched to lead guitar. Most band members lived on Cleveland Street in an old, run-down three-story mansion which was dubbed Gracelands. The house was a haven for musicians and artists who hosted art shows and nude discos. In July 1988 the group released their second album, Paddock of Love, which included the track "In the Raw".

On 2 November 1988, the band provided a nude performance, lip-syncing to "In the Raw", on the Australian Broadcasting Corporation TV program, Blah Blah Blah. The event created national media outrage, according to McFarlane: "The sight of the Goats' real (and imagined) body parts was enough to prompt scores of irate callers to jam the ABC's switchboard for 30 minutes, for the Daily Mirror to run a front-page exposé and for current affairs shows like the Midday Show, Hinch and Newsworld, plus radio commentators like Ron Casey, to call for an end to such moral depravity". The criticism was met by ABC-TV's presenter, Tim Bowden of Backchat, who "appeared shirtless behind his desk so as to give an impression of nudity while discussing listener's letters about [that group's] appearance". A documentary film about the event, directed by Cousin Creep and also titled In the Raw, explained why the band were nude for that performance. It premiered on 11 December 2009 at the 19th Meredith Music Festival. The lineup for the ABC performance included musician Peter Read (also of the band Thug), who was brought in on a temporary basis when another band member felt uncomfortable about appearing nude.

In a line-up change, Hartley was dismissed and Ford quit, replaced respectively by guitarist Charles Tolnay (ex-Grong Grong, King Snake Roost) and drummer Gene Revet (ex-Ragdoll, the Space Juniors). In May 1989, they issued the Schadenfreude EP. Lubricated Goat's back catalogue was reissued by Amphetamine Reptile Records in the United States and on Normal in Europe before the band embarked on its first US tour in mid-1989. Tolnay and Revet did not participate in the tour; Spasm and Maddison were joined by ex-Bloodloss member Renastair EJ (on guitar and saxophone) and Bland (on synthesiser as well as drums). Later, after Maddison's departure, this line-up recorded a third full-length album, Psychedelicatessen, with Lachlan McLeod (ex-Salamander Jim) on bass guitar and audio sampler. McFarlane noted that the album showed "a variety of styles (from noisy free-form jazz to noisier hard rock), with tortured guitars and raw vocals being the band's characteristic mode of operation".

In 1990, the group commenced its first European tour, one that was plagued with tragedy via the stabbing of Spasm in Berlin – "in a drug deal gone wrong", according to McFarlane. The incident placed Lubricated Goat on hiatus.

Various incarnations of Lubricated Goat (often featuring only Spasm) existed in the early 1990s, documented on the 7-inch singles "Meating My Head" (1990, part of the Sub Pop Singles Club), "Shut Your Mind" (1992, Sympathy for the Record Industry) and "Play Dead" (1993, Sub Pop). During this period, Spasm was also a member of grunge supergroup, Crunt, which featured his then-wife Kat Bjelland of Babes in Toyland as well as Jon Spencer Blues Explosion drummer, Russell Simins; Crunt released their eponymous debut in 1994.

Lubricated Goat resumed activity in the mid-2000s. Among the members were Australian drummer Hayden Millsteed (also a founder of New York post-punk band Bell Hollow), who performed on the band's 2003 album, The Great Old Ones, which featured re-recordings of previously released Lubricated Goat and Crunt tracks.

In 2007, a new line-up of Lubricated Goat started performing with Anne Mette Rasmussen on keyboards, sound effects and backup vocals; Creighton Chamberlain (formerly of Heroine Sheiks) on bass; and drummer Rich Hutchins (formerly of Live Skull and Of Cabbages and Kings).

The line-up changed again in 2009, with Chamberlain replaced by Jack Natz, formerly of the 1980s New Jersey punk band the Undead as well as Black Snakes, Cop Shoot Cop and Red Expendables. Natz had previously played bass in Lubricated Goat intermittently from the late 1990s through to the mid-2000s. Rasmussen left to form her own band, LoveStruck, which also included both Spasm and Hutchins.

As of 2015, Spasm now heads The Art Gray Noizz Quintet with Hutchins, Skeleton Boy (formerly of Woman) on bass, Andrea Sicco (of Twin Guns) and Grace Bergere on guitar, Nikki D'Agostino on saxophone, and Nicholas John Stevens on trombone.

Temporary 1988 member Read died in Melbourne in 2016 after battling liver cancer.

A full-length documentary was released chronicling the life and music of Stu Spasm, entitled "I Should Have Been Dead Years Ago". Directed by Jason Axel Summers, the film premiered in May 2024 and is touted as "Exploring the life, music, & artistic output of Stuart Gray, the notorious underground rocker who created the most psychotronic group to emerge from Australia – the legendary Lubricated Goat. Shot over 20 years, featuring archival footage, photos, interviews, Gray’s sculptures and paintings, live performance footage including Gray’s current band, The Art Gray Noizz Quintet."

== Discography ==
=== Studio albums ===
- Plays the Devil's Music (1987, Black Eye Records)
- Paddock of Love (1988, Black Eye Records) (1989, Amphetamine Reptile Records)
- Psychedelicatessen (1990, Black Eye Records/Amphetamine Reptile Records)
- Forces You Don't Understand (1994, PCP Entertainment)
- The Great Old Ones (2003, Reptilian Records)

=== Extended plays ===
- Schadenfreude 12-inch (Black Eye Records, 1989)

=== Singles ===
- "Meating My Head" 7-inch (1990, Sub Pop)
- "Shut Your Mind" 7-inch (1992, Sympathy for the Record Industry)
- "Play Dead" 7-inch (1993, Sub Pop)

=== Compilation appearances ===
- "Jason's Place" on Waste Sausage LP (1987, Black Eye Records)
- "In the Raw" on Good Beer, Tasty Sandwiches cassette (1989, Twin/Tone Records/Amphetamine Reptile Records)
- "Bad Times" on Dope-Guns-'N-Fucking in the Streets Volume Four double 7-inch EP (1990, Amphetamine Reptile Records)
- "Bad Times" on Dope-Guns-'N-Fucking in the Streets Volumes 4–7 CD (1990, Amphetamine Reptile Records)
- "All Too Sane", "Guttersnipe", "Kill Somebody Today", "Can't Believe We're Really Making Love" and "Jason the Unpopular" on Love God – Music from the Original Motion Picture Soundtrack CD (2000, Koch Records)
- "Play Dead" on Color of Noise Comp CD (2012, Amphetamine Reptile Records)
- "Play Dead" on The Color of Noise (Original Motion Picture Soundtrack) LP (2015, Amphetamine Reptile Records)
