= In the Raw (film) =

- Directed by: Craig Barnes
- Distributed by: Happening Films
- Release date: 11 December 2009 (Meredith Music Festival)
- Running time: 27 minutes
- Country: Australia
- Language: English

In the Raw is a 2009 documentary film about Lubricated Goat's nude appearance on Australian TV.

In November 1988, Andrew Denton's Blah Blah Blah program caused a nationwide stir by allowing guitar group Lubricated Goat to perform on Australian Broadcasting Corporation TV completely naked. The resulting media frenzy jammed phone lines as the public debated this supposed decline in Australian media standards.

In The Raw dispels myths which have arisen as a result of Lubricated Goat's nude appearance by exposing the politics, censorship, and nudity of this event through extensive interviews with the members of the band, ABC Management, and the Blah Blah Blah production team. The project was directed by Craig Barnes and made for Happening Films of Melbourne, Australia.

In the Raw debuted on Friday 11 December, at the 19th Meredith Music Festival Outlands Ecoplex Cinema.
