= 80 in the Shade =

EP by The Cops
- Released: 4 November 2006
- Genre: Indie rock
- Length: 14:45
- Label: Inertia
- Producers: Magoo; Simon Carter

The Cops chronology
Stomp on Tripwires (2004)	80 in the Shade (2006)	Drop It in Their Laps (2007)

80 in the Shade is the second EP released by Australian band The Cops. It was recorded by Magoo (Regurgitator, Midnight Oil) and the band's singer/songwriter, Simon Carter. It was mixed by Paul McKercher (You Am I, Sarah Blasko) and mastered by Greg Calbi at Sterling Sound.

At the AIR Awards of 2007, it was nominated for Best Performing Single or EP.

== Track listing ==
1. "Call Me Anytime" – 3:51
2. "Starve on My Love" – 4:05
3. "Beat Remainder" – 3:26
4. "Let Me Be Your Weapon" – 3:23

== Charts ==
Chart performance for 80 in the Shade
Chart (2006)	Peak position
Australia (ARIA)	90
