= Drop It in Their Laps =

Studio album by The Cops
- Released: 28 April 2007
- Studio: Electric Avenue Studios, Sydney; Zapp Hole Studios, Sydney; Black Box Studios
- Genre: Indie rock
- Length: 44:48
- Label: Inertia
- Producer: Paul McKercher; Simon Carter

The Cops chronology
80 in the Shade EP (2006)	Drop It in Their Laps (2007)

Drop It in Their Laps is The Cops' second studio album, released in April 2007, and marked a radical change of direction from the band's earlier work. Described by the band as an expansive pop/rock opus that showcases the best of the 80 in the Shade EP and new tracks recorded during the year prior to release, the album was co-produced by singer/songwriter Simon Carter and highly regarded Australian producer Paul McKercher (You Am I, Augie March), with minor production credits to Magoo (Midnight Oil, Regurgitator) and Kim Moyes (The Presets).

The album was recorded at Electric Avenue Studios and mixed at Studios 301 in Sydney then mastered by Chris Gehringer at Sterling Sound, New York.

Drop It in Their Laps is the first full-length release from the Cops on their new label, Inertia Recordings. It spent two weeks on the ARIA Albums Chart in May 2007, peaking at number 59.

== Track listing ==
1. "Out of the Fridge / Into the Fire" – 4:21
2. "Cop Pop" – 2:48
3. "Call Me Anytime" – 3:49
4. "The Message" – 4:13
5. "Respectagon" – 3:01
6. "I Yell Trouble" – 3:25
7. "Hot Weapon" – 3:10
8. "Turn Up the Radio" – 3:29
9. "Static Forever" – 3:04
10. "Le Chic" – 3:53
11. "Starve on My Love" – 4:02
12. "La Musica Del Diablo" – 2:48
13. "Get This Girl (Into My Life)" – 2:45

== Personnel ==
=== The Cops ===
- Simon Carter – vocals, guitar, keyboards, percussion
- Rebecca Darwon – bass guitar, vocals, piano, keyboards
- Jarrod Murphy – guitar, vocals
- Todd Smith – keyboards, vocals
- Nicholai Danko – drums, percussion

=== Additional musicians ===
- Angus McKay – horns
- Todd Hardy – trumpet, flugelhorn
- Brad Child – baritone saxophone, tenor saxophone
- Dan Barnett – trombone
- Matt Bruce, Belinda Jezek, Kerry Martin, Alexandra Mitchell & Stephanine Zarka – violin
- Heather Lloyd & Nick Wales – cello
- Nick Kennedy – drums

== Charts ==
Chart performance for Drop It in Their Laps
Chart (2007)	Peak position
Australian Albums (ARIA)	59
