= AIR Awards of 2007 =

2nd edition of annual Australian music award

- Date: 10 December 2007
- Venue: Toff of the Town, Melbourne, Australia
- Hosted by: James Young and David Vodicka

Highlights
- Most wins: Sneaky Sound System (2)
- Most nominations: Sneaky Sound System (6)
- Website: https://air.org.au/air-awards/

The AIR Awards of 2007 is the second annual Australian Independent Record Labels Association Music Awards (generally known as the AIR Awards) and was an award ceremony at Toff of the Town, in Melbourne, Australia on 10 December 2007 to honour outstanding achievements in sales by Australian independent artists. Four genre categories were added the list of awards from the previous year and German liquor brand, Jägermeister were named as the sponsor of the event for the first time.

In 2015, Angus of Sneaky Sound System reflected on the night saying "We felt incredibly proud. Being an independent artist we'd put so much time, energy and money into the album so to receive these awards felt really very special. The AIR Awards mean a lot. Platinum awards and chart success and glowing reviews are wonderful of course, but it is just as gratifying to be recognised by your fellow independent artists for the quality of you recordings."

== Performers ==
- British India
- Ben Winkleman
- Urthboy
- Blue King Brown

== Nominees and winners ==
=== AIR Awards ===
Winners are listed first and highlighted in boldface; other final nominees are listed alphabetically.

Best Independent Artist	Best Performing Independent Album
**Sneaky Sound System**; Gotye; Hilltop Hoods; The John Butler Trio; Wolf & Cub	**The John Butler Trio - Grand National** (Jarrah Records / MGM); Blue King Brown - Stand Up (Roots Level / MGM); Birds of Tokyo - Day One (Egg Records / MGM); Hilltop Hoods - The Hard Road Restrung (Obese Records); Sneaky Sound System - Sneaky Sound System (Whack Records / MGM); Wolf & Cub - Vessels (Dot Dash / Inertia Music)
Best Performing Independent Single / EP	Best New Independent Artist
**Sneaky Sound System - "UFO"**; Ricki-Lee Coulter - "Can't Touch It"; Sneaky Sound System - "I Love It"; Sneaky Sound System - "Pictures"; The Cops - "80 in the Shade"; The John Butler Trio - "Funky Tonight"	**British India** (Flashpoint/Shock); Birds of Tokyo (Egg Records / MGM); Macromantics (Remote Control / Inertia Music); Muph & Plutonic (Obese Records); Toni Collette and the Finish (Hoola Hoop / MGM); Urthboy (Elefant Traks / Inertia Music)
Best Independent Blues and Roots Release	Best Independent Country Release
**C.W. Stoneking - King Hokum** (Low Transit Industries/Inertia Music); Ash Grunwald - Give Signs (Delta Grooves / Shock); Blue King Brown - Stand Up (Roots Level / MGM); The John Butler Trio - Grand National (Jarrah Records / MGM); The Beautiful Girls - Ziggurats (Die Boredom! / MGM)	**Gina Jeffreys - Walks of Life** (Independent/MGM)
Best Independent Dance / Electronica Album	Best Independent Jazz Release
**Midnight Juggernauts - Dystopia** (Siberia/Inertia Music); Gotye - Mixed Blood (Samples n' Seconds / Creative Vibes); Hilltop Hoods - The Hard Road Restrung (Obese Records); Sneaky Sound System - Sneaky Sound System (Whack Records / MGM); Urthboy - The Signal (Elefant Traks / Inertia Music)	**Ben Winkleman Trio - The Spanish Tinge** (Jazzhead/MGM); FourPlay String Quartet - Now to the Future (Smart Pussy Records / MGM); Greg Meyer – Greg Meyer (Swingworks Music / MGM); Triosk - The Headlight Serenade (Inertia Music)
Best Independent Hip Hop / Urban Release
**Hilltop Hoods - The Hard Road** (Obese Records)

== See also ==
- Music of Australia
