= Porridge & Hotsauce =

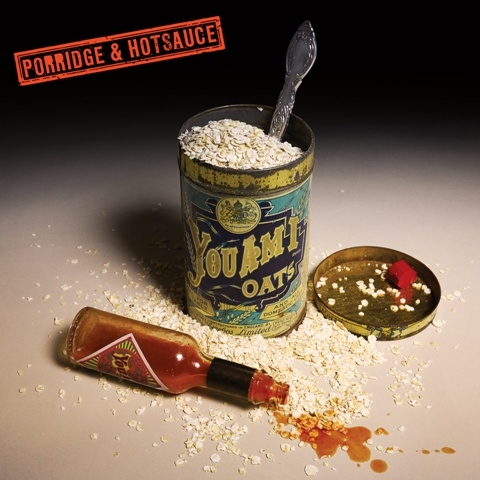

Studio album by You Am I
- Released: 6 November 2015
- Genre: Alternative rock
- Label: Inertia
- Producer: You Am I

You Am I chronology
You Am I (2010)	Porridge & Hotsauce (2015)	Spilt Sauce (2016)

Porridge & Hotsauce
Review scores
Source	Rating
The Guardian	3/5 stars
The Music	3.5/5 stars
News.com.au	3.5/5 stars
Rolling Stone	4/5 stars
The Sydney Morning Herald	4/5 stars

Porridge & Hotsauce is the tenth studio album by the Australian rock band You Am I. It was released on 6 November 2015.

The album was mainly recorded at Daptone's House of Soul Studio in Bushwick, Brooklyn, United States with some additional recording taking place at two studios in Melbourne. Porridge & Hotsauce peaked at No. 20 on the ARIA Albums Chart, and it was ultimately the band's lowest charting album since their debut album in 1993.

== Track listing ==
1. "Good Advices"
2. "Bon Vivants"
3. "No, A Minor Blue"
4. "Two Hands"
5. "One Drink At A Time"
6. "Out To The Never, Now"
7. "Daemons"
8. "Beehive"
9. "Buzz The Boss"
10. "She Said Goodbye"
11. "My Auld Friend"
12. "An East Doncaster Gurl"
13. "Porridge & Hotsauce"

== Charts ==
Chart (2015)	Peak position
Australian Albums (ARIA)	20
