= Forces You Don't Understand =

Studio album by Lubricated Goat
- Released: 27 September 1994
- Recorded: March 1992
- Studio: BC Studio (Brooklyn, NY)
- Genre: Noise rock, post-punk
- Length: 41:37
- Label: PCP Entertainment
- Producer: Martin Bisi, Stu Spasm

Lubricated Goat chronology
Psychedelicatessen (1990)	Forces You Don't Understand (1994)	The Great Old Ones (2003)

Professional ratings
Review scores
Source	Rating
AllMusic	2.5/5 stars

Forces You Don't Understand is the fourth studio album by Australian noise rock band Lubricated Goat, released on 27 September 1994 by PCP Entertainment.

== Track listing ==
All tracks are written by Lubricated Goat

No.	Title	Length
1.	"You Remain Anonymous"	3:45
2.	"Next World"	5:41
3.	"Crave"	3:31
4.	"The Hedonists"	3:28
5.	"Half-Life"	5:24
6.	"Psychic Detective"	2:20
7.	"Lost Time"	4:39
8.	"The Soul Remains in Pain"	3:07
9.	"20th Century Rake"	6:07
10.	"The Day in Rock"	3:30

== Personnel ==
Adapted from the Forces You Don't Understand liner notes.

Lubricated Goat

- Tony Lee – bass guitar
- Vincent Signorelli – drums
- Stu Spasm – lead vocals, guitar, bass guitar, sampler, synthesizer, tympani, production, recording (10)

Additional musicians and production

- Tod Ashley – sampler, tape, recording (10)
- Martin Bisi – production, engineering, recording
- Jim Collaruso – trumpet
- Jean Farrel Miles – design

== Release history ==
Region	Date	Label	Format	Catalog
United States	1994	PCP Entertainment	CD	PCP-012
