= Detourn =

Studio album by The S.I.G.I.T.
- Released: 21 March 2013
- Recorded: Massive Studio, Bandung
- Genre: Hard rock, blues rock, psychedelic rock, roots rock
- Length: 46:00
- Label: FFWD Records
- Producer: Rekti Yoewono & Farri Icksan

The S.I.G.I.T. chronology
Visible Idea of Perfection (2007)	Detourn (2013)

Professional ratings
Review scores
Source	Rating
Rolling Stone Indonesia	4/5 stars
Deathrockstar	Positive
Jurnallica	5/5 stars

Detourn is the second album by the Indonesian rock band The S.I.G.I.T. It was released nearly seven years after their first, Visible Idea of Perfection, in 2007. Previously, the band was planning to release it in 2012 but had to be postponed because of some reasons.

On March 15, the single "Let the Right One In" was released for free on their website. This album received great receptions from fans and many local music critics. In January 2014, Detourn was named the best album of 2013 by Rolling Stone Indonesia.

== Background ==
Post Visible Idea of Perfection era, they raced around the country’s rock circuit, visiting a variety of places and performing their songs numerous times. But still they were in the process of finishing the album. On an interview, the band promised the new album would be released in mid or late 2012 but later had to be postponed because they ran out of money or/and they had production issues. Also the band was working towards perfection. They won’t release it if they think it was not as good as the materials on the first LP. That helped to explain why the band had taken so long to finish their latest album. If they felt it wasn’t good enough, this album might not have been released for another five years.

== Recording and composition ==
Detourn was recorded at Massive Studio, Bandung. The album was produced by Rekti Yoewono (vocalist, guitarist) and Farri Icksan (guitarist). The album showed the group's fusion of blues, psychedelic and rock. For fans and the industry, the album was like a thirst-quencher—it was something had been awaiting for a very long time. Retail sales certainly point in that direction. The S.I.G.I.T. offered a fresh approach to their kind of rock music. The production on the album— which was a long process—comes across very well. They did a lot of sound explorations, flowing from one song to another, working on beats and few other things. Probably for some people, it will be quite hard to get this on the first hearing. This album was not as friendly to the ear as the previous one, but this was The S.I.G.I.T. now. And on the musical side, Rekti was given the opportunity to realize his long-held wish to have a flute and Irish whistle in "Son of Sam"; admittedly, not a common choice of instruments for a rock band.

== Released ==
The band planned to do another release show, just like what they did once when they released Hertz Dyslexia. And with the help from their label, and an event organized, "Detournement" was held on 26 October 2013, at the same venue as "The Dyslexia Concert". Renowned for their lavish stage shows, The S.I.G.I.T. set high standards in sound quality, used innovative sound effects, and lightnings. Also, many great local musicians were invited to have appearance. Like choir, backup singers, saxophone player, and many more talents. The preparations for the solo concert was, one could say— absolutely amazing. Proper one for the tenth anniversary of the band's togetherness.

Like the concert four years ago, fans from all over the country attended this legendary event. Over three thousand fans came to a venue of five thousand. Many were left wondered because of several bizarre gestures from the personnel. One was as Rekti came out from backstage with eyes of Fatima on the palm of his hands and was in dark cloak. People might have misinterpreted this gimmick as "illuminati", but that was just his blessing for the fans—so they may be kept away from bad lucks. But though, the show went on clock-wise and was considered successful.

The S.I.G.I.T. released 3 version of physical albums, which are LP, CD, and Cassette. They also released the boxset version containing CD, cassette, poster, and alternative cover artworks. On March 15, 2013, the single "Let the Right One In" was released for free on their website. This album received great receptions from fans and many local music critics. In January 2014, Detourn was named the best album of 2013 by Rolling Stone Indonesia.

== Track listing ==
All lyrics written by Rektivianto Yoewono and Farri Icksan; and music composed by The S.I.G.I.T.

1. "Détourné" 3:37
2. "Let the Right One In" 2:20
3. "Son of Sam" 3:30
4. "Gate of 15th" 2:53
5. "Tired Eyes" 4:58
6. "Owl and Wolf" 5:14
7. "Black Summer" (with "I Lay on Your Side" as a hidden track) 3:49
8. "Red Summer" 4:58
9. "Ring of Fire" 4:33
10. "Cognition" 3:49
11. "Conundrum" 6:20
