= The Cops (Australian band) =

Australian rock band

- Origin: Sydney, New South Wales, Australia
- Genre: Rock
- Years active: 2003–2008, 2015–2016
- Labels: Love Police Records/Reverberation; Illustrious Artists; Inertia
- Past members: See Members section
- Website: facebook.com/thecopsaustralia/

The Cops were an Australian rock band that formed in late 2003 by songwriter Simon Carter and bass player/keyboardist Rebecca Darwon (ex-Fyreflyes, Del-Emmas) in Sydney.

== History ==
Initially, Simon Carter began recording songs in his parents' basement, which were unlikely to see the light of day, until he sat down with his bass-playing friend Bec Darwon and offered to play her his demos.

"One day Simon asked if I'd like to hear some of his demos I didn't even know he had any so he put them on and they were awesome,"
"I told him we should start a band and it was funny because he didn't think they were any good but I thought they were great!"
— Rebecca Darwon

The Cops' original line-up also included Simon Meli (The Widowbirds), Jimmy Stacks (who previously played with Carter in 'General Lee'), Andrew Gilbert (Whom Carter played with in 'Hush Honey') and Nick Kennedy (ex-Big Heavy Stuff).

In early 2004, the band released their debut self-titled E.P. on Reverberation. In late 2004, The Cops signed with small independent record label Love Police Records, releasing the debut album Stomp On Tripwires in September that year.

In 2005, the band undertook numerous tours, with support slots for bands such as Blondie, The Dirtbombs, The Distillers, The Donnas, Dallas Crane and The Von Bondies; while also receiving nominations for 'Best Newcomer' and 'Best Bass Player' at the 2005 Jack Awards.

In May 2005, Jimmy Stacks left the band. This was followed by the departure of guitarist Andrew Gilbert and drummer Nick Kennedy. Carter and Darwon decided to rebuild the band, with Todd Smith being retained on keys, Jarrod Murphy, (ex-Major) on guitar and Nicholai Danko (78 Saab) on drums. The band also left their label, Love Police Records, and signed to Inertia Recordings in 2006 as the label's first exclusive recording artist.

The new line-up of the band recorded and released an EP entitled 80 In The Shade in November 2006. The EP's lead single, "Call Me Anytime," received significant airplay on numerous indie radio stations; with the video being played on MTV, Channel [V] and Rage. The song ended up placing at No. 33 in Triple J's Hottest 100 of 2006.

Making Triple J's Hottest 100 was a significant achievement for the band, as founding member Simon Carter stated:

"For years we've dreamt of getting on that bloody list. It was like some exclusive nightclub doorlist that forever eluded us, no matter how sharp and sexy a suit we were dressed in! Now, after spectacular support from our fans and Triple J, we were not only let in, we were given a free drink and a booth. Amen to that."
— Simon Carter

In 2007, The Cops supported !!! (Chk Chk Chk) on their east coast tour; as well as Kaiser Chiefs in March, followed by a performance at The Great Escape Festival in April.

The Cops released their second album, titled Drop It in Their Laps, on 28 April 2007, which was followed by a promotional tour and a national tour with Expatriate. The album spawned two singles, "Cop Pop" and "The Message," the latter of which came in at number 88 in the 2007 Hottest 100.

In early 2008, founding member Bec Darwon left the band because she no longer wished to tour. Rather than continue on, Simon Carter decided to put the band on indefinite hiatus and pursue a solo career. The demise of The Cops also saw the end of the working relationship between the band and Inertia. Carter released a solo record, The Black Book of the Universe, on Rusty Hopkinson's Illustrious Artists imprint in 2010.

In April 2015, Carter announced that The Cops would return for two headlining shows in Melbourne in May at the Northcote Social Club and Sydney in July at the Newtown Social Club. The shows intended to focus on the Stomp on Tripwires era of the band. Only Carter and Smith remained from the previous lineup; with Carter assembling a new line-up of Cec Condon (The Mess Hall) on drums, James Roden (The City Lights) on guitar and Archi Fires (Hell City Glamours, Black Ryder) on bass. Following the shows, Carter announced on Facebook that the new line-up and reunion of the band was permanent; and both a third studio album and further touring were both deemed "imminent." The band were also announced for the 2015 Newtown Festival in Camperdown Memorial Rest Park.

The band released a new single, entitled "Move Over Money," in September 2015. On 6 October 2015, it was officially announced that founding guitarist Jimmy Stacks was to rejoin the band. Ultimately, the reunion ceased activity in 2016, with Carter returning to making music as a solo artist.

== Band members ==
- Simon Carter – lead vocals, guitar (2003–2008; 2015–2016)
- Andrew Gilbert – guitar (2003–2005)
- Jimmy Stacks – guitar (2003–2005, 2015–2016)
- Nicholai Danko – drums (2005–2007)
- Todd Smith – keyboard, synthesizer, percussion, backing vocals (2005–2008; 2015–2016)
- Simon Meli – guitar, vocals (2003)
- Rebecca Darwon – bass, vocals (2003–2008)
- Nicholas Kennedy – drums (2003–2005, 2008)
- Jarrod Murphy – guitar, vocals (2006–2008)
- Cec Condon – drums (2015–2016)
- James Roden – guitar, backing vocals (2015–2016)
- Archi Fires – bass (2015–2016)

== Discography ==
=== Albums ===
Title	Details	Peak chart positions
Title	Details	AUS
Stomp On Tripwires	Released: 2004; Label: Love Police Records & Tapes (LPRT001); Formats: CD, DD	—
Drop It in Their Laps	Released: 2007; Label: Inertia (IR5225CD); Formats: CD, DD	59

=== Extended plays ===
Title	Details	Peak chart positions
Title	Details	AUS
The Cops	Released: August 2004; Label: Reverberation (REV004); Formats: CD, DD	—
80 in the Shade	Released: 2006; Label: Inertia (IR2513CD); Formats: CD, DD	90

=== Singles ===
- "The Shake" (2004)
- "Dirty Little Rebel" (2004)
- "Wallet Puffer Smokes Keys" (2004)
- "Call Me Anytime" (2007)
- "The Message" (2007)
- "Respectagon" (2007)
- "Move Over Money" (2015)

== Performances ==
=== Festivals ===
- Great Escape 2007
- Big Day Out 2005
- Come Together Music Festival 2005
- Falls Festival 2004
- Homebake 2004
- Pushover 2004
- Showdown at Sundown Festival 2004
- St Kilda Festival 2004 & 2005

=== Supporting ===
- Blondie
- The Von Bondies
- The Dirtbombs
- The Distillers
- The Black Keys
- The Donnas
- Dallas Crane
- Grinspoon
- Kaiser Chiefs

== Awards and nominations ==
=== AIR Awards ===
The Australian Independent Record Awards (commonly known informally as AIR Awards) is an annual awards night to recognise, promote and celebrate the success of Australia's Independent Music sector.

Year	Nominee / work	Award	Result
2007	"80 in the Shade"	Best Performing Independent Single or EP	Nominated

=== Jack Awards ===
- 2005 Best Bass Player – nominated
- 2005 Best Newcomer – nominated
