= Plays the Devil's Music =

Plays the Devil’s Music

Studio album by Lubricated Goat
- Released: July 1987
- Recorded: September 1986
- Studio: Martin Bland's living room No Sweat Studios, Perth, Australia
- Genre: Noise rock, garage rock
- Length: 28:07
- Label: Black Eye; Amphetamine Reptile (reissue)
- Producer: Martin Bland, Stu Spasm

Lubricated Goat chronology
Plays the Devil’s Music (1987)	Paddock of Love (1988)

Professional ratings
Review scores
Source	Rating
AllMusic	3/5 stars

Plays the Devil's Music is the debut studio album by Australian noise rock band Lubricated Goat, released in July 1987 by Black Eye Records.

== Track listing ==
All tracks are written by Stu Spasm.

Side one
No.	Title	Length
1.	"Jason the Unpopular"	2:57
2.	"Beyond the Grave"	3:49
3.	"Guttersnipe"	2:14
4.	"Nerve Quake"	3:17
5.	"Anal Injury"	1:21

Side two
No.	Title	Length
1.	"Hornraiser"	2:25
2.	"Frotting with Ennio"	4:23
3.	"Goats and the Men Who Ride Them"	4:10
4.	"Can't Believe We're Really Making Love"	3:37

== Personnel ==
Adapted from the Plays the Devil's Music liner notes.

Lubricated Goat

- Martin Bland – drums (B1–B4), backing vocals (B1–B4), production (B1–B4)
- Brett Ford – drums (A1–A5), backing vocals (A1–A5)
- Pete Hartley – bass guitar (A1–A5), guitar feedback (A1–A5), backing vocals (A1–A5)
- Stu Spasm – lead vocals, guitar, bass guitar, synthesizer, production

== Release history ==
Region	Date	Label	Format	Catalog
Australia	1987	Black Eye	LP	BLACK LP 2
United States	1989	Amphetamine Reptile	LP	ARR 89165
