= Paddock of Love =

Studio album by Lubricated Goat
- Released: July 1988
- Recorded: 22 August 1987 – 8 February 1988
- Studio: Sound Barrier and Trackdown Studios, Sydney, Australia
- Genre: Noise rock, post-punk
- Length: 47:24
- Label: Black Eye; Amphetamine Reptile (reissue)
- Producer: Stu Spasm

Lubricated Goat chronology
Plays the Devil’s Music (1987)	Paddock of Love (1988)	Schadenfreude (1989)

Professional ratings
Review scores
Source	Rating
AllMusic	2.5/5 stars

Paddock of Love is the second album by Australian noise rock band Lubricated Goat, released in July 1988 by Black Eye Records.

== Track listing ==
All tracks are written by Lubricated Goat.

No.	Title	Length
1.	"In the Raw"	4:28
2.	"Funeral on a Spit"	3:27
3.	"All Too Sane"	3:48
4.	"Bullock"	2:18
5.	"Broken Glass"	2:12
6.	"Gargoyles"	5:47
7.	"On the Gear"	6:31
8.	"Elsewhere Else"	5:59
9.	"He Moves in Mysterious Ways"	3:32
10.	"Promised Land"	2:29
11.	"Cannibal's Lament"	2:43
12.	"The Spectator"	4:10

== Personnel ==
Adapted from the Paddock of Love liner notes.

Lubricated Goat

- Brett Ford – drums, harmonica, backing vocals
- Pete Hartley – guitar, backing vocals
- Guy Maddison – bass guitar, backing vocals
- Stu Spasm – lead vocals, guitar, piano, synthesizer, percussion, production, bass guitar (2)

Additional musicians

- Nick Barker – bass guitar (3, 4, 11, 12)
- Ron Hadley – backing vocals
- Adrian Hornblower – saxophone (3, 12)
- Jody – backing vocals
- Lachlan McCleod – backing vocals

Production and additional personnel

- Dave Boyne – engineering (1–5, 10–12)
- Tim Ryan – engineering (6–9)

== Release history ==
Region	Date	Label	Format	Catalog
Australia	1988	Black Eye	CD, LP	BLACK 5
United States	1989	Amphetamine Reptile	CS, LP	ARR 89169
