= Vicious Circle (band) =

Australian hardcore punk band (formed 1983)

- Origin: Melbourne, Victoria, Australia
- Genres: Hardcore punk
- Years active: 1983–1990; 1995–present
- Labels: Reactor; Waterfront; Spent; Resist
- Spinoffs: Rue Morgue

Vicious Circle are an Australian hardcore punk band, which formed in 1983 and included founding members Paul Lindsay on lead vocals and Les Rumincik on lead guitar. They disbanded in 1990 and Lindsay and Rumincik formed Rue Morgue in the following year. Rue Morgue issued two albums, Soul Museum (1993) and Freak Nation (1995), before Lindsay and Rumincik revived Vicious Circle in 1995. That group's albums are Price of Progress (1985), Reflections (1986), Into the Void (1988), Reactivate (compilation album, 1995), Internal Headstrength (1997) and Perfect World Disaster (1999).

== History ==
Before the band was formed, Alby Brovedani co-produced, with Zol Szacsuri, a punk fanzine called Regression, with 11 issues published between 1982 and 1984.

Vicious Circle formed in late 1983 as a hardcore punk band in Melbourne by Alby Brovedani on bass guitar and guitar (ex-Politburo), Paul Lindsay on lead vocals, Les Rumincik on lead guitar (ex-Politburo) and Michael on drums. Michael was replaced on drums by Russell Hopkinson in 1984. Two early tracks, "Blood Race" and "Police Brutality" appeared on a Various Artists compilation album, Eat Your Head (1984) via No Master's Voice, which was re-released on CD in 1997 by Au Go Go Records. The group's debut five-track extended play, Search for the Solution, appeared in early 1985 via Reactor Records, which was owned by Phil McDougall.

The hardcore group followed with their first studio album, Price of Progress, in September 1985 also on Reactor. According to Australian musicologist, Ian McFarlane, it was "a ground-breaking release in the annals of the local hardcore scene." The album was also issued by Children of the Revolution record label in the United States and Europe. From their US contacts they teamed up with American punk rockers, Youth Brigade to issue a split album Epitaph/Care in April 1986. They released their first single, "A Nightmare so Quick", in that month. By that time David Ross had replaced Hopkinson on drums and Keith Chatham joined on bass guitar to allow Brovedani to focus on rhythm guitar.

Reflections, Vicious Circle's second album appeared in October 1986 via Reactor in Australia and on Boner in the US. McFarlane noticed it had "elements of melody seeping into the band's all-out thrash approach." The Australian hardcore band toured the US for three months, supporting gigs by GBH, Agnostic Front, MDC or Attitude Adjustment. Upon return to Melbourne at the end of that year Ross was replaced on drums by James Lynch. The group's last work for Reactor, Hope and Wait, was an EP issued in September 1987. They were signed to Sydney-based label, Waterfront Records in 1988, Lindsay explained, "the decision to go to Waterfront was made whilst [McDougall] was still running Reactor, I know because I told him."

Vicious Circle's studio album, Into the Void, was released on Waterfront in February 1988. RebelSynner of The Corroseum observed, "it's perhaps the most enjoyable [album] for Metal fans". The group continued until 1990 when they disbanded.

=== Rue Morgue years ===
Rue Morgue were formed by Lindsay and Rumincik in 1991 as an "eclectic mix of hardcore punk, death metal and skate-core." Other members were Danny O'Callaghan on drums, Gary Proghoulis on bass guitar and Peter on guitar. They provided the track, "Romance of Death", for the Various Artists' compilation Redrum (June 1993) via the Australian branch of Roadrunner Records. Soul Museum, their debut album, was issued late in 1993 via Def Records. A second album, Freak Nation, followed in January 1995 but Lindsay and Rumincik re-established Vicious Circle in mid-year.

=== Reformation and later years ===
With Vicious Circle's reformation they released a compilation album, Reactivate, in July 1995 on Def Records. They followed with a four-track EP of new material, Fixated, on Spent Records/Shock Records in March 1993. Internal Headstrength, their first album after the reunion, appeared in June 1996 with Lindsay and Rumincik joined by Gary on guitar, Chris Arnott on bass guitar (ex-Buttjuice) and Stu on drums. Their next album, Perfect World Disaster, was issued via Resist Records in 1999. For the album, Born Yesterday (2006), the line-up was Lindsay, Proghoulis, Lygnos, Squires and Williams. By Don't Lose It (2012) Lindsay was joined by Adam Shirley on guitar and vocals and Heath on drums, with Mano returning for the USA and Asia tours.

In 2024, Paul Lindsay and Adam Shirley formed the Melbourne hardcore punk band Copulaters, which has since received positive coverage in the punk and hardcore music press.

== Members ==
- Alby Brovedani – bass guitar, rhythm guitar (1983–1990)
- Paul Lindsay – lead vocals (1983–1990, 1995–present)
- Les Rumincik – lead guitar (1983–1990, 1995–2008)
- Michael – drums (1983–1984)
- Russell Hopkinson – drums (1984–1986)
- Keith Chatham – bass guitar (1986–1987)
- David Ross – drums (1986)
- James Lynch – drums (1987–1990)
- Gary Proghoulis – guitar (1996–2008)
- Mano Lygnos – bass (2001-2003) guitar (2005 - 2009)
- Chris Arnott – bass guitar
- Stu - drums
- Heath Williams – drums (2007 - 2015)
- Ash Newman – drums (2015 – 2019)
- Adam Shirley – guitar, vocals (2010 – 2016)

Rue Morgue

- Paul Lindsay – lead vocals (1991–1995)
- Danny O'Callaghan – drums (1991–1995)
- Gary Proghoulis – bass guitar (1991–1995)
- Les Rumincik – lead guitar (1991–1995)
- Peter – guitar (1991)

== Discography ==
=== Albums ===
- Price of Progress (September 1985) – Reactor Records (REACTOR 007)
- Epitaph/Care by Vicious Circle/Youth Brigade (split album, April 1986) – Reactor Records (REACTOR 009)
- Reflections (11 February 1986) – Reactor Records (REACTOR 015)
- Into the Void (10 February 1988) – Waterfront Records (Damp82)
- Reactivate (compilation album, July 1995) – Def Records (0019)
- Internal Headstrength (13 June 1996) – Spent Records (0017)
- Perfect World Disaster (1999) – Resist Records (RES004)
- Switched On (2000) – Circlework Records (001)
- Born Yesterday (2006) – Circlework Records
- Only the Brave (2008) – Circlework Records
- Don't Lose It (2012) – Circlework Records
- Knucklehead (2013) – Circlework Records
- Never Give In (2015) – Circlework Records
- Born to Destroy (2017) – Circlework Records

=== Extended plays ===
- Search for the Solution (February 1985) – Reactor Records (REACTOR 4)
- Hope and Wait (September 1987) – Reactor Records (REACTOR 17)
- Fixated (March 1996) – Spent Records/Shock Records (0010)
