= Crunt =

American rock band

Background information
- Origin: Minneapolis, Minnesota, U.S.
- Genres: Alternative rock, noise rock, garage rock, grunge
- Years active: 1993–1995
- Labels: Insipid Records, Trance Syndicate
- Members: Kat Bjelland; Stuart Gray; Russell Simins

Crunt was an American alternative rock band active from 1993 to 1995. Formed when all three members were living in Seattle, the band included Kat Bjelland of Babes in Toyland and Stuart Gray, who were married during the band's career. Bjelland considered the band something of a side project from her main output and drummer Russell Simins was also a member of the Jon Spencer Blues Explosion. Gray had previously been in Salamander Jim and Lubricated Goat prior to the formation of the band.

In February 1993, the band wrote a number of songs and the same month entered the studio to record their first and only album, the self-titled Crunt. Though the album's recording and production were short, the album was not released until a year later in February 1994. After the album's release, the band had plans for a full tour in order to promote the album, however, no such tour eventuated. Crunt disbanded around the same time Bjelland and Gray filed for divorce in January 1995.

== Band members ==
- Kat Bjelland – bass, vocals
- Stuart Gray – guitar, vocals
- Russell Simins – drums, vocals

== Discography ==
- Crunt (Trance Syndicate, 1994)
  - "Swine/Sexy" (promotional single released in Australia, Insipid Records, 1994)
  - "Unglued" (appearance on compilation album The Best of Babes In Toyland and Kat Bjelland, WEA International, 2004)
