= Mylee Grace =

- Genres: Rock and roll; folk; alternative country; indie rock
- Labels: Love Police
- Website: myleegrace.bandcamp.com

Mylee Grace is an Australian singer and songwriter based in Northern NSW. Her debut album Whiplash in the Moshpit was released in November 2021 on Love Police Records.

== History ==
Mylee Grace recorded her first EP Songs From Cat Hill when she was 16 years old. The EP featured the song Thesaurus Rex which had high rotation on FBi Radio and was later re-released in 2011 on her EP Baby Talk.

Following her 2011 EP Grace performed as Mylee & The Milkshakes. Later she released an album with her then-husband called Mylee Grace and Ozzy Wrong Songs, which they recorded mostly live in one week during 2013. The album was promoted with a video for the song Cloud Over Paradise directed by Sam Kristofski.

In 2020 Mylee Grace began working on a new album featuring collaborations with the likes of Stu Mackenzie (King Gizzard & the Lizard Wizard) on flute, Miles Myjavec (The Babe Rainbow) on percussion, and Molly Lewis whistling. She released the single and music video to Someday Song in 2021 to positive reviews, with Rolling Stone Australia calling it "equal parts hazy, relaxing, and resonant." Two more music videos for singles Call Me and Any Road followed, and in November 2021 Whiplash in the Moshpit was released on Love Police Records. The album was likened to a mix of The Band, Mazzy Star, and The Velvet Underground. It is made up of songs written over a seven-year period with the title taken from one of her song lyrics. The album was produced by Sam Joseph who has worked with King Gizzard & the Lizard Wizard and was mixed by Mikey Young (Eddy Current Suppression Ring / Total Control).

== Discography ==
- Baby Talk EP (2011)
- Mylee Grace and Ozzy Wrong Songs (2013)
- Whiplash In The Moshpit (2021)
