= Love Police Records =

- Founded: 20 September 2004
- Founder: Brian Taranto; Andy Kent
- Distributor: Reverberation
- Genre: Various
- Country of origin: Australia
- Location: Surry Hills, Sydney
- Official website: www.lovepolice.com.au

Love Police Records or Love Police Records and Tapes is an independent record label based in Surry Hills, Sydney. It was founded by Brian Taranto in September 2004 as a concept born from a t-shirt design, who was then joined by Andy Kent (of You Am I). One of their earliest signings was the Cops, which issued an album, Stomp on Tripwires (September 2004).

In September 2004 Taranto explained why he had started the label, "We started a label because we loved the Cops' demos so much, and we could also see the potential of future releases that involved international artists we tour. It was more of a case of 'Why not, we can do this ourselves' than some master plan to be independent."

The motto for Love Police Records is: "stop talkin crap, record it, package it, put it out... someone will like it." Love Police Records are distributed by Reverberation in Australia and New Zealand.

== Artists ==
- The Rolling Blackouts
- The Cops
- Mylee Grace
