= Great Ohio Bicycle Adventure =

Bicycle tour in Ohio, United States

The Great Ohio Bicycle Adventure (GOBA) is an annual week-long bicycle tour through the U.S. state of Ohio, averaging 50 miles (80 km) daily and featuring a different part of the state each year. Like other bicycle tours, GOBA is not a race; participants instead complete each day's ride at their own pace while stopping at various tourist destinations along the route. The first GOBA was held in 1989 and has grown to accommodate nearly 3,000 riders from around the world.

GOBA is primarily a tent camping tour, but trucks deliver riders' bags to the designated campgrounds. When GOBA arrives in a host town, a red carpet is rolled out with entertainment and food. Unlike other state bicycle tours, like Register's Annual Great Bicycle Ride Across Iowa (RAGBRAI), the Spectacular Annual Great Bike Ride Around Wisconsin (SAGBRAW), or the Bicycle Ride Across Georgia (BRAG), GOBA's route forms a loop, ending where it started in the initial departure city.

Since 1993, there have been layover days, where there is an option to take a loop or to stay in a particular city. GOBA is a project of Columbus Outdoor Pursuits (COP), a volunteer organization that provides opportunities and education for outdoor recreation.
