= Psychedelicatessen (Lubricated Goat album) =

Studio album by Lubricated Goat
- Released: August 1990
- Recorded: May 1990
- Studio: Electric Avenue Studios, Sydney, Australia
- Genre: Noise rock
- Length: 36:19
- Label: Black Eye/Amphetamine Reptile
- Producer: Lubricated Goat, Phil Punch

Lubricated Goat chronology
Schadenfreude (1989)	Psychedelicatessen (1990)	Forces You Don't Understand (1994)

Professional ratings
Review scores
Source	Rating
AllMusic	4/5 stars

Psychedelicatessen is the third studio album by Australian noise rock band Lubricated Goat, released in 1990 by Black Eye Records and Amphetamine Reptile Records.

== Release and reception ==
AllMusic staff writer Skip Jansen gave the album 4 out of 5 stars, praising it as being "classic noise rock in the vein of Helios Creed, the Jesus Lizard, and Halo of Flies".

== Track listing ==
All tracks are written by Lubricated Goat

No.	Title	Length
1.	"Stroke"	2:24
2.	"Eternal Loser"	3:25
3.	"New Kind of Animal"	4:36
4.	"Give Chance a Piece"	2:32
5.	"Lullaby"	2:44
6.	"I Saw It"	2:31
7.	"Stu's"	5:16
8.	"Spoil the Atmosphere"	4:41
9.	"Never Know What Hit You"	5:37
10.	"You're Fading Out"	2:29

== Personnel ==
Adapted from the Psychedelicatessen liner notes.

Lubricated Goat

- Martin Bland – drums, synthesizer
- Renastair E. J. – guitar, saxophone
- Lachlan McCleod – sampler
- Stu Spasm – vocals, guitar, bass guitar, synthesizer

Production and additional personnel

- Don Bartley – mastering
- Lubricated Goat – production
- Phil Punch – production, recording, engineering

== Release history ==
Region	Date	Label	Format	Catalog
Australia	1990	Black Eye	CD, LP	BLACK 11
United States	1990	Amphetamine Reptile	CD, LP	89204
