= Kryptonics =

Pop punk band from Perth, Western Australia

- Origin: Perth, Western Australia
- Genres: Pop punk Alternative rock
- Years active: 1985–1992, 2007, 2012
- Label: Festival Records/Mushroom Records
- Past members: see Members list

Originally from Perth, Western Australia, Kryptonics were a melodic pop punk band that were active between 1985 and 1992. Kryptonics were contemporaries of notable Perth bands The Stems, The Triffids & The Bamboos, and released a series of 7" singles and 12" vinyl EPs on a number of Australian independent record labels.

== Biography ==
Guitarist, Ian Underwood first met Cathy Webb (bass guitar) at Balcatta Senior High School in 1982, forming a band, when drummer Shakir Pichler answered a drummer wanted classified ad. The Kryptonics spent eighteen months in rehearsals before their first public performance, supporting The Stems in August 1985. Underwood however was not confident singing and playing guitar at the same time so Michael Reynolds was approached to perform lead vocals for the band. Shortly after the band recorded its first single, "Baby"/"Plastic Imitation" on local label, Cherry Top, along with a music video for the A side "Baby". On the eve of the single being released in January 1986 Pichler left the band to join another local band, The Bamboos. With the loss of Pichler, Underwood decided to go for an even bigger change with the band line-up, taking over the front man responsibilities from Reynolds and recruiting drummer Brett Ford, who had been spending time in England, and had just returned to Perth. In addition to Ford, they also had decided to add a guitar player, Peter Hartley, from a band called Lavender Disaster. With the new line-up the released their next single, "Land That Time Forgot" / "She's Got Germs", in 1987 on the Easter label and the flexi-single "Cyclops" / "Rock Me to Sleep" which came with issue No. 6 of Vortex fanzine. By this time, the band had reached the critical point where Perth bands either collapse or make the attempt at going the next step up, playing interstate. Playing interstate from Perth however is a different story than touring out of Brisbane, Melbourne or Adelaide. On their first trip, their van broke down in some little town in the middle of nowhere, and they spent three days trying to get rolling again with gigs waiting on the other end of the country. When they finally got up on a Sydney stage, things went much better. The band played well and audiences liked them, and they got to open for bands such as The Screaming Tribesmen and The Psychotic Turnbuckles. They also did some shows as headliners in smaller hotels. Chris Dunn from Waterfront Records saw them a couple times on this tour and told them that if they ever wanted to make a record, to come see him at Waterfront. After a two-week tour of Sydney, the band returned to Perth, but, buoyed by the success of the tour, they decided to try it again. The trip was a disaster, with Ford and Underwood getting arrested halfway across the Nullarbor Plain, subsequent tour dates being cancelled or rescheduled, resulting in a split within the band. Webb, Ford and Hartley all left the band and they were replaced by Russell Hopkinson and Greg Hitchcock, both from The Bamboos. This line-up recorded the band's first EP, Sixty Nine, which was released by Sydney-based label Waterfront in May 1989. Hopkinson and Hitchcock however left the band prior to the tour to promote the record, leaving Underwood to recruit his fourth line-up.

There were numerous changes to the drummer and bass player, before the line-up of Underwood (vocals and guitar), Tony Rushan (guitar), Peter Kostic (drums) and Jeff Halley (bass) was eventually finalised. The band issued the single "When It's Over" / "Oedipus Complex" on Waterfront in September 1989. A revised line-up of Underwood, Rushan, Kostic and Greg Brennan on bass recorded a new single for the Seaside label, "Bad September" / "Another Girl Another Planet" (live) / "Telephone Line" (live) which was released in November 1990. Richard Corey replaced Brennan in July 1990, and the band re-located to Sydney in August 1990 and toured heavily up and down the Eastern seaboard. The Kryptonics issued a 12-inch EP, Tonka Tuff, on the Zero Hour label in 1991 before parting company in mid-1992. They are remembered chiefly today for the number of ex-members who have gone to feature prominently in high-profile Australian artists including You Am I, Front End Loader, Lubricated Goat, Regurgitator & The Chevelles.

Underwood later formed Challenger 7 in Sydney in 1995, and recorded a mini album with the help of former Kryptonics members Greg Hitchcock, Peter Kostic and Richard Corey. He continued with that band under different line-ups until its demise in 2002. He now runs Reverberation, a Sydney-based independent label and distributor with his former bandmate Russell Hopkinson.

In November 2007 Underwood, Kostic, Corey and Rushan reformed to play a one-off performance in Perth, where they were joined by former guitarist Hitchcock for a number of songs.

== Discography ==
=== Albums/EPs ===
- Sixty Nine – Waterfront (DAMP95) (May 1989)
- Tonka Tuff – Zero Hour (ZERO801) (1991)
- Rejectionville – Memorandum/Reverberation (MEM03) (14 May 2007)

=== Singles ===
- Baby/Plastic Imitation – Cherry Top (CT002) (1985)
- Land That Time Forgot/She's Got Germs – Easter (MR7029) (January 1987)
- Cyclops/Rock Me to Sleep – Vortex fanzine (1987)
- Oedipus Complex/When It's Over – Waterfront (DAMP117) (October 1989)
- Bad September/Telephone Line (live)/Another Girl Another Planet (live) – Seaside (PIP001) (November 1990)

=== Contributions ===
- Hometown Farewell Kiss – 6UVS (DT001) (1988) ("Dare")
- I Could'a Been a Contender (A Waterfront Compilation) – Waterfront (DAMP121) (1989) ("Land That Time Forget")
- Across the Nullarbor (Triple J presents 16 Hot Bands from Perth) – ABC Music (838 975–1) (1990) ("Baby")
- This Ain't the Plimsouls – Zero Hour (ZEROCD 1001) (1991) ("I Want You Back")
- Bad Timing (A Perth Pop Retrospective) – Rubber/Idaho Music (RUB031) (1994) ("Land That Time Forgot" [live])

== Members ==
- Michael Reynolds – lead vocals (1985–1986)
- Ian Underwood – guitar (1985–1992, 2007), backing vocals (1985–1986), lead vocals (1986-1992, 2007)
- Cathy Webb – bass (1985–1987)
- Shakir Pichler – drums (1985–1986)
- Peter Hartley – guitar (1986–1987)
- Brett Ford – drums (1986–1987)
- Greg Hitchcock – guitar (1987–1988)
- Russell Hopkinson – drums (1987–1988)
- Tony Rushan – guitar, backing vocals (1989–1992, 2007)
- Jeff Halley – bass (1989–1990)
- Andrew Robinson – drums (1989)
- Peter Kostic – drums (1989–1992, 2007)
- Greg Brennan – bass (1990)
- Richard Corey – bass (1991, 2007)

== See also ==
- Waterfront records
- Lubricated Goat
- You Am I
