= Blah Blah Blah (TV series) =

1988 comedy television show

Blah Blah Blah is a 1988 comedy television show starring Andrew Denton, broadcast on the Australian Broadcasting Corporation. The show is most notable for the fact that it began the television careers of many Australian performers including Anthony Ackroyd, Flacco and Roy & HG. With its late night time slot, it was able to get away with a lot more adult humour and content than many other shows of the era.

Regular segments included In Bed Tonight with James Scanlon, and a performance by a rock band.

A running joke at the beginning of the series was that Denton was the "work experience kid" filling in while they were waiting for the real star of the show to arrive, à la Waiting for Godot. In contrast to the Godot play, he finally does arrive, five minutes from the end of the final episode.

The show also featured some controversial live performances: Ignatius Jones, former lead singer of Jimmy and the Boys, performed live in a suit made entirely from cuts of meat; and in November 1988 Lubricated Goat performed live, stark naked.
