= Čop (surname) =

Čop is a Croatian and Slovene surname. Notable people with the surname include:

- Bojan Čop (1923–1994), Slovenian linguist
- Davor Čop (born 1958), Croatian football player and manager
- Duje Čop (born 1990), Croatian footballer
- Franci Čop (1914–2003), Slovenian alpine skier
- Iztok Čop (born 1972), Slovenian rower
- Josip Čop (born 1954), former Croatian footballer
- Matija Čop (1797–1835), Slovene linguist, literary historian and critic
  - Čop Street
- Milan Čop (born 1938), former Croatian footballer
