= Crunt (album) =

Studio album by Crunt
- Released: 1994
- Recorded: February 1993
- Genre: Rock
- Label: Trance Syndicate
- Producers: Stuart "Spasm" Gray, Russell Simins

Crunt is a studio album by the American band Crunt, released in 1994. It was the band's only album. An estimated 20,000 copies had been sold worldwide as of January 1995.

== Critical reception ==
Professional ratings
Review scores
Source	Rating
AllMusic	3/5 stars
Robert Christgau	(2-star Honorable Mention)
Select	3/5

Trouser Press called the album an "enthusiastic if offhand outing," while acknowledging Simins's "typically muscular contribution." The Guardian thought that "the resolutely low-fi recording quality mashes the sound into a muddy sub-heavy metal broth that pleads for the description 'bloody racket', but this has its own bizarre charm." The Columbus Dispatch deemed it "a loud, distorted, violent, unpretty, harsh, nasty slab of music," writing that "the over-the-top rock 'n' roll here is mostly humorous." The Asbury Park Press deemed it "a mighty fine white-trash rock 'n' roll album."

Stephen Howell, in his AllMusic review, wrote: "Crunt proves that three chords and a childish mentality can be taken a long way. This is simplistic rock & roll that manages to create a fast and memorable hook for anyone within earshot."

== Track listing ==
All songs by Crunt

1. "Theme from Crunt"
2. "Swine"*
3. "Blackheart"
4. "Unglued"
5. "Changing My Mind"
6. "Snap Out of It"
7. "Sexy"
8. "Punishment"
9. "Spam"
10. "Elephant"
- * indicates single

== Personnel ==
- Stuart "Spasm" Gray – vocals, guitar
- Kat Bjelland – bass, vocals
- Russell Simins – drums, vocals
