= Rusty Hopkinson =

- Born: Russell Keith Hopkinson; East Fremantle, Western Australia, Australia
- Genre: Rock
- Occupation: Musician
- Instruments: Drums, guitar, vocals
- Years active: 1981–present
- Label: Reverberation

Russell Keith "Rusty" Hopkinson is an Australian rock musician and record label owner. He joined alternative rockers, You Am I, in 1993 on drums, percussion and backing vocals. He had previously been a member of the Bamboos (1986–87) and Kryptonics (1987–88). He established a record label, Reverberation, in 2003 with his former Kryptonics bandmate, Ian Underwood.

== Biography ==
Early in 1981 in Perth, Hopkinson was the lead vocalist and guitarist for Circle A, which included Don Burr on lead guitar and the Tarrant brothers: Dan on bass guitar and John on drums. They disbanded before the end of the year while Hopkinson and Burr (now on bass guitar) formed Zoo Rejects in the following year with Sean Pickersgill on guitar and vocals, and Craig Weighell on drums. However Hopkinson soon left and joined Genocide, on drums, by mid-1982, with Costa on lead vocals, Matthew Snashall on bass guitar and Craig Tobin on lead guitar. Hopkinson later recalled growing up in Fremantle, "I was really into punk rock. Being into punk rock in those days meant things could be pretty scary. I went to the same school that Bon Scott had been to, and we had a lot of run-ins while I was growing up. But there were lots of interesting people around – Fremantle's a port town, so you tend to get an interesting mix."

In January 1983 Hopkinson, Snashall and Tobin were joined by Ken Knight on lead vocals to form Mob Vengeance. Tobin left in August and they continued with a new guitarist. Knight became a local promoter and later recalled, "[we] were one of the early Perth punk bands; there wasn't too many places we were actually able to play at the time. The West Australian public was a bit terrified of people with green and pink hair. We had a residency for a while with the Quick and the Dead, the big skinhead band at the time. We used to have to play in the daylight hours at the City Hotel."

In 1984 Hopkinson replaced founding drummer, Michael, in Melbourne-based hardcore punk outfit, Vicious Circle, alongside Alby Brovedani on bass guitar and guitar (ex-Politburo), Paul Lindsay on lead vocals and Les Rumincik on lead guitar (ex-Politburo). Their early recordings include two tracks, "Blood Race" and "Police Brutality", on various artists compilation album, Eat Your Head (1984). The debut album, The Price of Progress, followed in September 1985. Hopkinson left in April 1986 and was replaced by David Ross.

Late in 1986 Hopkinson replaced Shakir Pichler on drums in Perth-based swamp rockers, the Bamboos, which included Greg Hitchcock on guitar (ex-Go Starts, Grave Robbers). They issued a single, "With Which to Love Her", in October 1987 and they had already broken up. Hopkinson and Hitchcock joined local garage rockers, Kryptonics, in mid-1987 with Jeff Halley on bass guitar (ex-Sunstones), and Ian Underwood on guitar and vocals. The line-up released an extended play, 69 (May 1989), on Waterfront Records; however, by that time Hopkinson was replaced by Andrew Robinson on drums (ex-Ritual).

Hopkinson formed Nursery Crimes, a punky power pop group, in Melbourne in early 1989 with Paddy Chong on bass guitar, David Dixon on guitar and backing vocals, Caine Knight on lead guitar and Phil Rose on lead vocals (ex-Slush Puppies). Their debut single, "All Torn up Iniside", and EP, No Time for that Crime, appeared late in 1990 on Au Go Go Records. The group's debut album, Fun Hurts!, was issued in May 1992, which was co-produced by the band members with Kaj Dahlstrom. At the end of that year Hopkinson was replaced by Chris Latham on drums.

Hopkinson was an occasional drinking buddy of You Am I members, whenever they visited Melbourne, from the turn of the 1990s. A month before the release of that group's first album, Sound As Ever (November 1993), their drummer, Mark Tunaley, was "ousted from the band." Hopkinson was brought in as his replacement. Ever since, he has been a core member of the band with Andy Kent on bass guitar and Tim Rogers on vocals, guitar and keyboards. According to Australian musicologist, Ian McFarlane, Hopkinson "supplied the boost of confidence required for You Am I to make the leap into the premier league of Australian rock." His first major performance with his new group was an appearance at the second annual, Big Day Out, national tour during January 1994.

Hopkinson's only recorded lead singing role for a You Am I song is on a cover of the Mummies' track "(You Must Fight to Live) On the Planet of the Apes" which is the B-Side of their single, "Good Mornin'" (September 1996). During a You Am I tour of the United States, their lead guitarist, Davey Lane, told Hopkinson that he had a side project, the Pictures which had recorded a demo. Hopkinson later described how "[Lane] didn't know how to go about putting out a record so I told him that I would do it. After that, I put out a single for The Vines and also for Persian Rugs. That was fun so I thought I'd put out some proper CDs and that is how it started." The Pictures issued a single, "You'll See" (2001), on Hopkinson's Illustrious Artists label with the Vines' "Hot Leather" and Persian Rugs' "Mr Tripper" (both 2002) following.

He established a record label, Reverberation, in 2003 with his former Kryptonics bandmate, Ian Underwood. Underwood described how they formed the label, "I'd known Russell by that time for about 20 years. We'd played in bands together, we'd been flatmates for a while and I worked for You Am I for a bit too. So Russell had Illustrious Artists and I had a couple of titles laying around as well and we realised that there wasn't anyone out there who wanted to distribute what we had, so we thought we'd have a shot at it ourselves. When we started, Russell had eight titles, I had a few and we just set (Reverberation) up in a room with our entire catalogue in a bookshelf."

== Drumming style and influences ==
Rogers cites Hopkinson's drumming style as the key part of the group's sound. So much so that when he writes new material, it's the drumming ferocity that will decide whether the song will be performed by You Am I or Rogers' other band, the Tim Rogers and the Temperance Union. Rogers described him, as "an enigma, a renaissance man and the best drummer in the world."

Rusty is often seen to wear his drumming influences on his sleeve. In a Triple J radio J File interview he comments "I try to sound like three different drummers in every song [laughs]", citing Ian Paice of Deep Purple as a key influence. Other sixties and seventies influences referenced include the Super Stocks, The Pretty Things, The Honeycombs and the Who.

With several songs, particularly on the Convicts album, Rusty recorded the drum tracks after only rehearsing the piece two or three times. His fills are often heavily improvised.

Upon the death of Syd Barrett in 2006, Rusty was interviewed on Triple J radio about the influence of Syd in the early days of Pink Floyd. He is also believed to be a fan of much other psychedelic era music.

== Equipment ==
Since 2001 Rusty has enjoyed a relationship with Pearl Drums whose drums he endorses wholeheartedly. On the 2006 Convicts tour, he played with a blue Pearl five-piece with two floor-mounted toms. He consistently uses Zildjian Custom A cymbals and New Beat 15" hi-hats. His snare drum collection includes a solid Jarrah Brady Snare (handmade Western Australian Drum), a 1968 Ludwig Superphonic snare and a handmade perspex Gas snare.

== Side projects ==
Aside from You Am I, Rusty has also played with Australian punk act Radio Birdman on their Zeno Beach (2006) album and consequent tours. Other bands Rusty is said to have been associated with during the course of his career include Circle A, Zoo Rejects, Genocide, Mob Vengeance, Dismembered, Insurrection, Vicious Circle, Greenhouse Effect, The Bamboos, Memento Mori, Cremator, The Kryptonics, Nursery Crimes and Killing Time as well as playing on The Pictures' second album, Kicking Indiffference. Outside of his band involvements, Rusty manages record label and distribution company Reverberation Records.

Hopkinson comperes a show, "Stronger Than Dirt" (a reference to his beloved Mummies), on Sydney radio station 2SER which features music from the last two centuries including Pre WW2 Folk and Jazz, Obscure Psychedelia, Gutter Punk, "Blue" Comedy records and Asian Go Go music.

=== Quotes ===
- "Tim comes up with the chords and the melody and we start playing it – I don’t know I can speak in terms of drums being a drummer. I want to provide a back beat for people to be the foundation of the song… it’s all about trying to make Tim’s hips swing basically when I see him when in studio playing he’ll pull off some move and you know you’re in the right zone – it’s just about turning each other on and enjoy playing to each other. That’s the bottom line". Access All Areas.net.au
- [User profile from SETI web site] "Hey I'm a rocknroll drummer from Sydney, Australia. I'm in my thirties and as a hobby I run an independent record label called "Illustrious Artists". I love sixties science fiction movies like "Teenagers from Outer Space" and I collect records, mainly underground psychedelia like The Blues Creation and July. I'm married to a beautiful woman named Andrea (we got married in Vegas a couple of years ago)and we have two cats (Flugelhorne and Cheeks)and an Old English Sheepdog (Dewey)."
- [Asked about his favourite song] "Drumming-wise, Rumble, because I nicked the drum beat from Kraftwerk's Showroom Dummies", says Hopkinson. "Or Minor Byrd, because it's the sound of a very white-bread punk drummer trying to be funky like a James Brown record and ending up sounding like something else entirely."
- "I've played on more shitty punk records than you've had hot dinners".
