= Reverberation (record label) =

- Founded: 2003
- Founder: Russell Hopkinson; Ian Underwood
- Distributor(s): Reverberation
- Genre: Various
- Country of origin: Australia
- Location: Sydney
- Official website: Reverberation website

Reverberation is an Australian independent record label distributor. It helps distribute records from independent overseas records labels such as Alternative Tentacles and Eyeball Records, and also for small record labels such as Love Police Records and their own label Reverberation.

Reverberation was started in 2003 by Russell Hopkinson (You Am I) and Ian Underwood (The Kryptonics).

== Representation ==
=== Labels ===
- Art School Dropout
- Big Radio
- Blazing Strumpet
- Butcher's Hook
- Cass
- Caveman
- Coqi
- Daptone
- Funhouse
- Helltrack
- Illustrious Artists
- Livecast
- Love Police
- Memorandum
- Microindie
- Pee Records
- Red Recordings
- Reverberation
- Spasticated
- Two Bucks

=== Bands ===
- Brian Jonestown massacre
- Children Collide
- The Cops
- D.O.A.
- The Holy Soul
- The Fuzz
- Dave Graney & Clare Moore
- Loene Carmen
- Mexico City
- Midnight Juggernauts
- The Queers
- Red Riders
- Richie and the Creeps
- Schvendes
- Sloan
- Tim Steward
- The Whats
- The Flower Machine
- The Wright Hill

== See also ==
- List of record labels
