= List of RocKwiz episodes =

RocKwiz is an Australian television quiz show series focused on rock music and broadcast on SBS One. It premiered in 2005. The final episode aired on 25 June 2016. In February 2019, SBS Channel Manager Ben Nguyen announced that the show is not returning to SBS.

In October 2022, it was announced the series will be revived by Foxtel and air on Fox8 in 2023 with eight 30-minute-long episodes.

With the possible exceptions of episodes 49, 105, 106 and 107, the following episode numbering is as per SBS OnDemand information.

== Season 1 ==
Episode	Original airdate	Guest performers
1	31 January 2005	Christine Anu and Joe Camilleri
2	5 February 2005	Angie Hart and Dave Graney
3	12 February 2005	Vika Bull and Dave Larkin
4	19 February 2005	Rebecca Barnard and Tim Rogers
5	26 February 2005	Katy Steele and Paul Kelly
6	5 March 2005	Sophie Koh and Jimmy Little
7	12 March 2005	Deborah Conway and Tex Perkins
8	19 March 2005	Vanessa Morgan and Ross Wilson
9	26 March 2005	Lisa Miller and Robert Forster
10	2 April 2005	Donna Simpson and Paul Hester
11	9 April 2005	Roman Tucker and Renée Geyer
12	16 April 2005	Ella Hooper and Troy Cassar-Daley

== Season 2 ==
Episode	Original airdate	Guest performers
13	26 November 2005	Jimmy Barnes and Mahalia Barnes; with panelist Michael Gudinski
14	3 December 2005	Martha Wainwright and Dan Kelly
15	10 December 2005	Kat Spazzy and Chris Bailey
16	17 December 2005	Chrissy Amphlett and Chris Cheney
17	7 January 2006	Mia Dyson and James Reyne
18	14 January 2006	Clare Bowditch and Ed Kuepper
19	21 January 2006	Sally Dastey and Kutcha Edwards
20	28 January 2006	Mark Seymour and Felicity Urquhart
21	4 February 2006	Stephen Cummings and Tania Doko
22	11 February 2006	Glenn Tilbrook and Linda Bull
23	18 February 2006	Mick Harvey and Sarah Blasko
24	25 February 2006	Angry Anderson and Sarah McLeod
25	4 March 2006	Dave Faulkner and Holly Throsby
26	11 March 2006	Dave McCormack and Jade MacRae
27	18 March 2006	Mick Thomas and Kavisha Mazzella
28	25 March 2006	Kim Salmon and Jodi Phillis
29	1 April 2006	Venetta Fields and Davey Lane

== Season 3 ==
Episode	Original airdate	Guest performers
30	?	Special including: Deborah Conway, Ella Hooper, Rebecca Barnard, Tim Rogers, Tex Perkins, Dave Larkin
31	29 July 2006	Eddi Reader and Liam Ó Maonlaí
32	5 August 2006	Gareth Liddiard and Taasha Coates
33	12 August 2006	Sarah Lee Guthrie and Chris Wilson
34	19 August 2006	Ron Peno and Jen Cloher
35	26 August 2006	Mary Black and Shane Howard
36	2 September 2006	Archie Roach and Sara Storer
37	9 September 2006	Martha Wainwright and Adrian Belew
38	16 September 2006	Kate Ceberano and Eran James

== Season 4 ==
Episode	Original airdate	Guest performers
39	24 February 2007	Kate Miller-Heidke and Paul Dempsey
40	3 March 2007	Chelsea Wheatley and Chris Ballew
41	10 March 2007	Betty Harris and John Paul Young
42	17 March 2007	Beccy Cole and Mark Lizotte
43	24 March 2007	Deni Hines and Michael Spiby
44	31 March 2007	Serena Ryder and Lior
45	7 April 2007	Anne McCue and Sean Kelly
46	14 April 2007	Josh Pyke and Neko Case
47	21 April 2007	Leanne Kingwell and Matt Taylor
48	28 April 2007	Melinda Schneider and Russell Morris
49	?	"End of Year Special" Compilation of highlights and outtakes from previous episodes (included on Series 4 DVD)
50	?	Special: "Live at the Forum" Rockwiz at the Melbourne Comedy Festival Katie Noonan, Glenn Shorrock; with Kev Carmody
51	?	Special: "Best of the Fest"; Rockwiz at the Melbourne Comedy Festival. A compilation of four sold-out shows.

== Season 5 ==
Episode	Original airdate	Guest performers
52	29 September 2007	Jackie Marshall and Colin Hay; with Wanda Jackson
53	6 October 2007	Abby Dobson and Rai Thistlethwayte
54	13 October 2007	Natalie Pa'apa'a and Ian Moss
55	20 October 2007	Jess McAvoy and Charles Jenkins
56	27 October 2007	Kevin Borich and Sacred Cowboys' Penny Ikinger
57	3 November 2007	Gina Jeffreys and Doc Neeson
58	10 November 2007	Sharon O'Neill and Dann Hume
59	17 November 2007	Dave Dobbyn and Anika Moa; with Noel Crombie
60	1 December 2007	Tin Lids' EJ Barnes and Liam Finn
61	8 December 2007	Billy Miller and Stephanie Dosen
62	15 December 2007	Paul Gray and Abbe May; with Ross Hannaford
66	22 December 2007	2007 Christmas Special. (See below.)
64	29 December 2007	Laura Jean and Ned Collette; with Tim Rogers and Talei Wolfgramm
65	5 January 2007	Lisa Mitchell and Quan Yeomans; with Jon Cleary
63	12 January 2008	Love Outside Andromeda's Sianna Lee and Phil Jamieson

=== RocKwiz 2007 Christmas special ===
On 22 December 2007, a special RocKwiz show (RocKwiz Christmas Special) was broadcast featuring the RocKwiz band (James Black, Peter Luscombe, Mark Ferrie) along with the Wolfgramm Sisters on backing vocals, Ashley Naylor on guitar and following guest performers:

- All Alone on Christmas / Please Come Home on Christmas / Christmas Ain't Christmas Without The One You Love / Run Run Rudolf / All I Want For Christmas - The Wolfgramm Sisters, Jade MacRae, Joe Camilleri, Ashley Naylor and the RocKwiz Orkestra
- Fairytale of New York - Clare Bowditch, Tex Perkins, Joe Camilleri, Ashley Naylor and the RocKwiz Orkestra
- Christmas Wrapping - Chelsea Wheatley, The Wolfgramm Sisters, Ashley Naylor and the RocKwiz Orkestra
- River - Angie Hart, Tim Freedman, Ashley Naylor and the RocKwiz Orkestra
- Maybe This Christmas - Tim Freedman, Ashley Naylor and the RocKwiz Orkestra
- How To Make Gravy - Paul Kelly, Dan Kelly, Ashley Naylor and the RocKwiz Orkestra
- Merry Christmas Everybody - Liam Finn, Jade MacRae, Tex Perkins, Clare Bowditch, Chelsea Wheatley, Angie Hart, Tim Freedman, Paul Kelly, The Wolfgramm Sisters, Brian Nankervis, Julia Zemiro, Ashley Naylor and the RocKwiz Orkestra

== Season 6 ==
Episode	Original airdate	Guest performers
68	6 September 2008	Sophie Koh and Steve Kilbey
70	13 September 2008	Abbe May and Dom Mariani
69	20 September 2008	Karina Utomo and Steve Lucas
72	11 October 2008	Leo Sayer and The Wolfgramm Sisters
78	18 October 2008	Amandah Wilkinson and Dominic Byrne
71	25 October 2008	Catherine Britt and Max Merritt
67	30 October 2008	Kasey Chambers and Shane Nicholson
77	1 November 2008	Wendy Matthews and Johnny Galvatron
79	8 November 2008	Tony Hadley and Kylie Auldist
80	15 November 2008	Eve von Bibra and Jed Kurzel
81	22 November 2008	Liz Stringer and Dan Wilson
82	29 November 2008	Tina Arena and Jeff Martin
83	6 December 2008	Kram and Elana Stone
84	13 December 2008	Amanda Brown and Glenn Richards
74	10 January 2009	Patience Hodgson and Broderick Smith
73	17 January 2009	Angie Hart and Nathan Hudson
86	24 January 2009	Adalita and Gareth Liddiard
85	31 January 2009	Toni Childs and Adam Green
87	7 February 2009	Lilith Lane and Tim Finn
88	14 February 2009	Vanessa Amorosi and Ashley Naylor
89	21 February 2009	Barrence Whitfield and Paris Wells
90	28 February 2009	Richard Clapton and The Bamboos' Ella Thompson
91	7 March 2009	Special episode titled "RocKwiz Salutes the Bowl". (See below.)
76	31 March 2009	Taasha Coates and Pete Murray
75	24 April 2009	Toby Martin and Sarah Kelly

=== RocKwiz Salutes the Bowl ===
On 7 March 2009, a special 90-minute RocKwiz show (RocKwiz Salutes the Bowl) was broadcast as the sixth season's finale. The episode was filmed on 13 February 2009 at the Sidney Myer Music Bowl in front of a crowd of about 11,000 people (as part of the Bowl's 50th birthday celebrations). Whilst the show maintained a similar quiz format to a regular episode, it featured many more guest stars giving performances before, between, and after the usual rounds. For the occasion, the regular RockWiz band was expanded with the Wolfgramm Sisters on backing vocals, Ashley Naylor on guitar, and a horn section featuring Paul Williamson.

- Nic Cester & Ashley Naylor – Venus & Mars / Rock Show / Maybe I'm Amazed
- Kram – Most People I Know (Think That I'm Crazy)
- Rebecca Barnard & Billy Miller – World of Our Own
- Adalita – Rock 'N' Roll Ain't Noise Pollution
- Kutcha Edwards, Ron Murray & Joshua Bond – Treaty
- Denis Walter – Crunchy Granola Suite
- Jeff Duff – Dancing Queen
- Paul Kelly – Cinnamon Girl
- Madder Lake's Mick Fettes – 12Lb Toothbrush
- Stephen Cummings & Andrew Pendlebury – Who Listens to the Radio?
- Ella Hooper & Skyhooks' Bob Starkie – Living in the Seventies
- Ross Wilson & Ross Hannaford – Bom Bom
- Ross Wilson & Ross Hannaford – Hi Honey Ho
- Bella Hunter – April Sun in Cuba
- Dave Faulkner & Lisa Miller – Like A Rolling Stone
- Patience Hodgson, Glenn Richards & Paul Kelly – Leaps And Bounds
- Judith Durham – The Carnival Is Over

== Season 7 ==
Episode	Original airdate	Guest performers
93	3 October 2009	Holiday Sidewinder and Andrew Stockdale
95	10 October 2009	Bertie Blackman and Jim Keays
92	17 October 2009	Victoria Williams and Henry Wagons
94	24 October 2009	Jenny Morris and Don McGlashan
96	31 October 2009	Dash & Will and Kav Temperley
97	7 October 2009	Katy Steele and Bob Evans
98	14 November 2009	Suzannah Espie and Brian Cadd
99	21 November 2009	Loene Carmen and Jack Ladder
100	28 November 2009	Dan Sultan and Ella Hooper, Ashley Naylor, The Wolfgramm Sisters, Paul Williamson, Ross Irwin
101	5 December 2009	Megan Washington and G. Love
102	12 December 2009	Teeth & Tongue's Jess Cornelius and Mike Rudd
104	19 December 2009	2009 Christmas Special. (See below.)
103	26 December 2009	Sarah Blasko and Leader Cheetah's Dan Crannitch
105	16 October 2010	RockWiz Live on the Road
106	23 October 2010	RockWiz Live in Toowoomba Clare Bowditch, John Paul Young, Kevin Borich & Adalita Srsen
107	30 October 2010	2010 Aria Hall of Fame Awards at the Hordern Pavilion in Sydney

Note: it is not certain that episodes 105, 106 and 107 are officially part of season seven.

=== RocKwiz 2009 Christmas special ===
The 2009 RocKwiz Christmas special was broadcast on 19 December 2009. The 90-minute special was filmed at the Palais Theatre in St. Kilda, Melbourne. The show featured a regular quiz format, except that there were multiple contestants and guest performers. The regular RocKwiz Orkestra was augmented by Ashley Naylor on guitar and the Wolfgramm sisters (Eliza, Kelly, and Talei) on vocals. The guest performers were (in order of performance):

- Tex Perkins and Tim Rogers
- Paris Wells
- Paul Gray and Abby Dobson
- Adalita Srsen
- Bill Chambers and Kasey Chambers
- Holiday Sidewinder and Glenn Richards
- Toby Martin and Sarah Kelly
- Sally Seltmann and Dan Kelly
- Tex Perkins and Paris Wells
- Vika Bull and John Paul Young
- Tim Rogers
- Joe Camilleri

== Season 8 ==
Episode	Original airdate	Guest performers
113	19 March 2011	Marcia Hines and Ohad Rein
108	26 March 2011	Sally Seltmann and Dave Mason
109	2 April 2011	Georgia Fields and Normie Rowe
110	9 April 2011	Romy Hoffman and Oh Mercy's Alexander Gow
111	23 April 2011	Gemma Ray and Jon English
112	16 April 2011	Mary Gauthier and Jordie Lane

== Season 9 ==
Episode	Original airdate	Guest performers
114	1 October 2011	Chris Cheney and Suzi Quatro
115	8 October 2011	Lanie Lane and Alex Burnett
116	15 October 2011	Linda Bull and Black Joe Lewis
117	22 October 2011	Jae Laffer and Patience Hodgson; with Owl Eyes
118	29 October 2011	Talei Wolfgramm and The Felice Brothers' Simone Felice
119	5 November 2011	Ben Salter and Kimbra
120	12 November 2011	Shellie Morris and Ross Wilson
121	19 November 2011	Leah Flanagan and David Bridie; with Busby Marou
122	26 November 2011	Hayley Mary and Jon Stevens
123	3 December 2011	Jarad Brown and Kate Miller-Heidke
124	10 December 2011	Lucie Thorne and The Groop's Ronnie Charles
125	17 December 2011	Stonefield's Amy Findlay and Nick Barker; with Dirty Dozen Brass Band
126	24 December 2011	2011 Christmas Special. (See below.)

=== RocKwiz 2011 Christmas special ===
The 2011 RocKwiz Christmas special was broadcast on 24 December 2011. The 82-minute special was filmed at the Palais Theatre in St Kilda, Melbourne. The show featured three quiz segments, the first involving guest performers and the second and third (and main quizzes) involving four audience members with team leaders Rebecca Barnard and Lanie Lane, and then Josh Pike and Jon English. The guest performers were (in order of performance):

- "Merry Christmas Everybody" – sung by The Nymphs (Kelly Day, Clare Hendry, Jane Hendry)
- "Sleigh Ride" – sung by Julia Zemiro
- "Soul Christmas" – sung by Shellie Morris and Ross Wilson
- "All I Want For Christmas Is You" – sung by Henry Wagons
- "Santa Baby" – sung by Patience Hodgson
- "Someday at Christmas" – sung by Josh Pyke
- The Bellrays' "Rocket ship Santa" – sung by Rebecca Barnard
- "A Christmas Card from Dougal McAndrew" – read by Brian Nankervis
- "Christmas Card from a Hooker in Minneapolis" – sung by Lanie Lane
- "Happy Xmas (War Is Over)" and "Jesus Christ, Superstar" – sung by Jon English
- "Christmas Must Be Tonight" – sung by Paul Kelly
- Ramones' "I Don't Want to Fight Tonight" – sung by Patience Hodgson and Ross Wilson
- "Love Will Roll the Clouds Away" – sung by everyone (including the audience)

== Season 10 ==
Episode	Original airdate	Guest performers
127	7 July 2012	Tim Freedman and Judy Collins
132	14 July 2012	Emma Louise and Husky Gawenda; with Steve Harley
131	21 July 2012	The McClymonts (Brooke, Mollie & Samantha) and John Williamson
130	28 July 2012	Emma Russack and Children Collide's Johnny Mackay; with Ziggy Marley
128	4 August 2012	Jake Stone and Eilen Jewell
136	11 August 2012	Missy Higgins and Butterfly Boucher
134	18 August 2012	Joe Camilleri and Mary Wilson; with Gil Askey
133	25 August 2012	Jordi Davieson and Gossling (Helen Croome); with Wendy Saddington
137	1 September 2012	Ainslie Wills and 360 (Matt Colwell)
135	8 September 2012	Amaya Laucirica and James Reyne; with Julia Stone
129	15 September 2012	Hugo Race and Amanda Palmer
138	22 September 2012	Clairy Browne & The Bangin' Rackettes and C. C. Adcock. A tribute to Levon Helm was included at the end of the episode.

== Season 11 ==
Episode	Original airdate	Guest performers
	25 May 2013	RocKwiz Bluesfest Special (see details below)
145	1 June 2013	Julian Hamilton and Connie Mitchell; with Gabrielle Aplin
141	8 June 2013	Tinpan Orange's Emily Lubitz and Paul Dempsey with John Paul Young
147	15 June 2013	Passenger and Deborah Conway with Archie Roach
143	22 June 2013	Urthboy and Bertie Blackman with Mark Seymour
146	29 June 2013	Adalita and J Mascis with Sarah Lee Guthrie & Johnny Irion
144	6 July 2013	Nkechi Anele and Chet Faker with Sarah Blasko
152	13 July 2013	Jess Ribeiro and Tim Rogers with Henry Wagons
140	20 July 2013	Courtney Barnett and Dave Faulkner with Bob Evans
149	27 July 2013	Sherry Rich and Steve Kilbey with The Hungry Kids of Hungary
142	3 August 2013	Sophia Brous and Jens Lekman with Gurrumul Yunupingu
148	10 August 2013	Sal Kimber and Troy Cassar-Daley with Spencer P. Jones
151	17 August 2013	Jen Cloher and Ronnie Burns with Russell Morris
139	24 August 2013	Hailey Cramer and Norman Blake with Joe Camilleri and Jess Cornelius
150	31 August 2013	Mia Dyson and Tex Perkins with Don Walker and Charlie Owen

=== RocKwiz Bluesfest special ===
- Vika & Linda Bull
- Alan Stone
- Ruthie Foster
- Steve Kilbey
- Tex Perkins
- Trombone Shorty
- Nkechi Anele & Saskwatch Horns
- Kylie Auldist & Lance Fergusson
- Emily Lubitz
- Dan Sultan
- Russell Morris

== Season 12 ==
Episode	Original airdate	Guest performers
S12E01	24 March 2014	RocKwiz Vanda and Young Special (see details below)
S12E02	31 March 2014	Ella Thompson and Dan Sultan; with Owl Eyes
S12E03	7 April 2014	Steve Smyth and Juanita Stein; with Ross Wilson & Eric McCusker
S12E04	14 April 2014	Isabella Manfredi and Stephen Cummings; with Georgi Kay
S12E05	21 April 2014	Miss Murphy and Robert Susz; with Suze DeMarchi
S12E06	28 April 2014	Olympia and Declan Melia; with Sweet Jean
S12E07	5 May 2014	Phoebe Baker and Kurt Vile; with Iva Davies
S12E08	12 May 2014	Courtney Barnett and Billy Bragg; with Ngaiire
S12E09	19 May 2014	Marlon Williams and Pieta Brown; with Tina Arena
S12E10	26 May 2014	Mikelangelo and Colleen Hewett; with Megan Washington
S12E11	2 June 2014	Kira Puru and Garland Jeffreys; with Sally Seltmann
S12E12	9 June 2014	Heidi Lennfer and Sam Margin; with Daryl Braithwaite
S12E13	16 June 2014	Fiona Boyes and Russell Morris; with Frente
S12E14	23 June 2014	RocKwiz at Bluesfest 2014 Special (see details below)

=== RocKwiz Vanda and Young special ===
- Nic McKenzie
- Hailey Cramer
- The Basics
- Ashley Naylor
- Gossling
- Steve Kilbey
- Doc Neeson
- Issabella Manfredi
- Mark Gable
- Dave Larkin

=== RocKwiz at Bluesfest 2014 special ===
- Vika & Linda Bull
- Adalita Srsen
- Robert Susz
- Steve Earle
- Grace Potter
- Continental Robert
- Garland Jeffreys

== Season 13 - RocKwiz Salutes The Decades ==
Episode	Original airdate	Guest performers
S13E01 "The 50s"	30 May 2015	Caitlin Park, Joe Camilleri, Katie Noonan and Col Joye
S13E02 "The 60s"	6 June 2015	Declan Melia, Dinah Lee, Normie Rowe and Holiday Sidewinder
S13E03 "The 70s"	13 June 2015	Kira Puru, Vance Joy, Tex Perkins and Glenn Shorrock
S13E04 "The 80s"	20 June 2015	Scarlett Stevens, Jordi Davieson, Kate Ceberano and Dave Faulkner, Connie Mitchell
S13E05 "The 90s"	27 June 2015	Emma Donovan, Robert Forster, Davey Lane and Tim Freedman
S13E06 "The 000s"	4 July 2015	Julia Stone, John Butler, Seth Sentry and Paul Kelly

== Season 14 - RocKwiz Salutes The Legends ==
Episode	Original airdate	Guest performers
S14E01 "...of Europe"	7 May 2016	Jess Cornelius, Megan Washington, Phoebe Baker and Lou James
S14E02 "...of the USA"	21 May 2016	Ms Murphy and Mojo Juju with Kav Temperley
S14E03 "...of the UK"	28 May 2016	Sarah Blasko and Tim Rogers with Josh Pyke
S14E04 "...of Ireland"	4 June 2016	Montaigne and Dan Kelly (Maddy & Memphis) with Henry Wagons
S14E05 "...of Canada"	11 June 2016	Olympia and Brian Cadd with Paul Dempsey
S14E06 "...of New Zealand"	18 June 2016	Hollie Smith and Mark Williams with Gypsy & The Cat
S14E07 "...of Australia"	25 June 2016	Blake Scott and Ella Hooper, with Richard Clapton, Archie Roach, Emma Donovan and Craig Pilkington

Vika and Linda provide lead and backing vocals on all episodes.

== Season 15 - Foxtel Series 1 ==
Episode	Original airdate	Guest performers
S15E01	24 February 2023	Jimmy Barnes and WILSN
S15E02	3 March 2023	Allen Stone and Meg Mac
S15E03	10 March 2023	Tina Arena and Izzi Manfredi
S15E04	17 March 2023	Ben Lee and Megan Washington
S15E05	24 March 2023	Vance Joy and Gretta Ray
S15E06	31 March 2023	Sam Cromack and Ella Hooper
S15E07	7 April 2023	Dan Sultan and Thndo
S15E08	14 April 2023	Chris Cheney and Fanny Lumsden

== DVD releases ==
- RocKwiz Series 1 – Contains episodes 1–12
- RocKwiz Series 2 – Contains episodes 13–29
- RocKwiz Series 3 – Contains episodes 31–38
- RocKwiz Series 4 – Contains episodes 39–48, 49 (End of Year Special) and 50 (Live at the Forum)
- RocKwiz Salutes The Bowl
- RocKwiz 2010 National Tour
