= The RocKwiz Christmas Album =

RocKwiz Christmas Album

Compilation album
- Released: 2011
- Label: Liberation Music

RocKwiz Christmas Album is a compilation album of songs recorded for Rockwiz Christmas specials at the Palais Theatre in 2007 and 2009. It was released on vinyl and CD.

== Reception ==
Sally Browne of the Sunday Mail wrote "With loads more cool Yule songs to unwrap, there's plenty here to make you say 'Christmas rocks!' and not 'Bah humbug!'." The Age's Michael Dwyer gave it 3½ stars saying "RocKwiz presses its real-deal difference with this gritty cull from two past Christmases at the Palais."

== Accolades ==
| Year | Award | Nomination | Result |
|---|---|---|---|
| 2012 | ARIA Music Awards | Best Original Soundtrack/Cast/Show Album | Nominated |

== Album track listing ==
1. Christmas Medley '07 - The Wolfgramm Sisters, Jade Macrae, Joe Camilleri
2. Fairytale Of New York - Tex Perkins, Clare Bowditch
3. River - Tim Freedman, Angie Hart
4. Maybe This Christmas - Tim Freedman
5. Christmas Wrapping - Chelsea Wheatley, The Wolfgramm Sisters
6. How to Make Gravy - Paul Kelly
7. Merry Christmas Everybody - Liam Finn, Jade Macrae, Tex Perkins, Clare Bowditch, Chelsea Wheatley, Angie Hart, Tim Freedman, Paul Kelly, The Wolfgramm Sisters
8. Little Drummer Boy - Tex Perkins, Tim Rogers
9. Christmas Medley '09 - The Wolfgramm Sisters, Paris Wells, Abby Dobson
10. 2000 Miles - Adalita
11. Christmas Time - Kasey Chambers, Bill Chambers
12. Just Like Christmas - Glenn Richards, Holiday Sidewinder
13. The Christmas Song - Sarah Kelly, Toby Martin
14. Hey Guys! It's Christmas Time - Dan Kelly, Sally Seltmann
15. Blue Christmas - Tex Perkins, Paris Wells
16. Christmas Train - Vika Bull, John Paul Young
17. Christmas (From Tommy) - Tim Rogers
18. (What's So Funny 'Bout) Peace, Love, and Understanding - Joe Camilleri, Tim Rogers, The Wolfgramm Sisters

Track 1 is a medley of All Alone On Christmas, Christmas (Baby Please Come Home), Christmas Ain't Christmas (Without The One You Love), Run Rudolph Run and All I Want For Christmas Is You
Track 9 is a medley of What Christmas Means to Me, This Christmas, Who Took the Merry Out Of Christmas, Last Christmas
Tracks 8, 9, 11, 15 and 16 are omitted from the vinyl version.
