= Holiday Sidewinder =

Australian singer-songwriter and producer

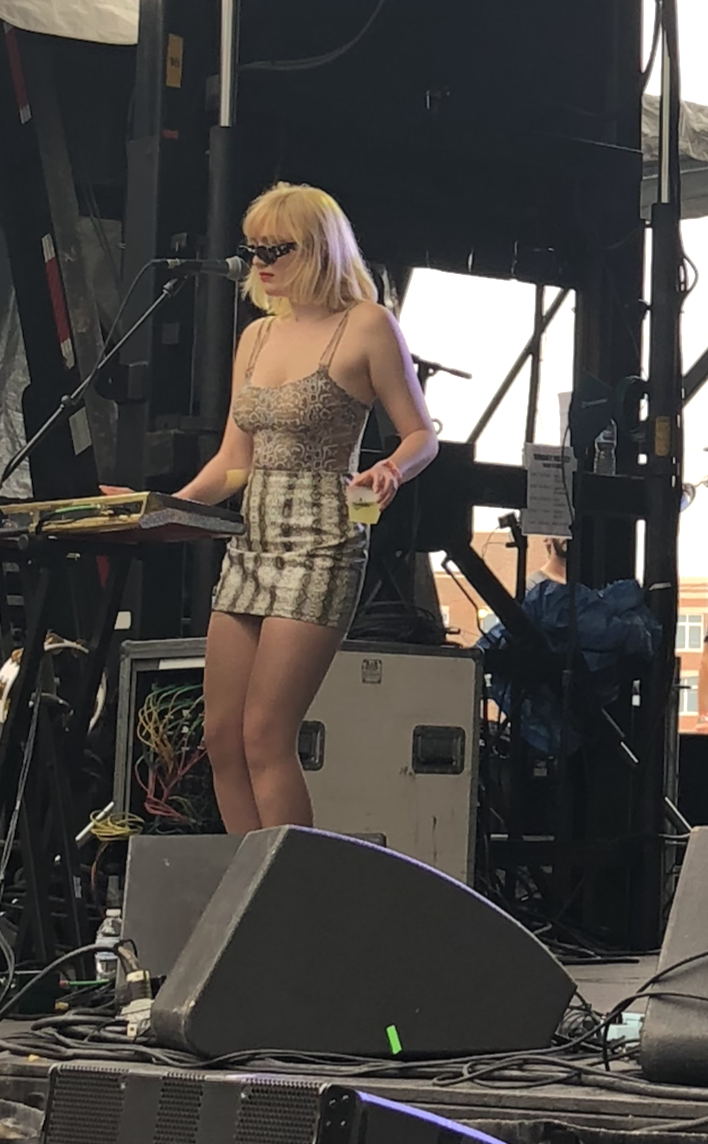
- Sidewinder performing in 2018

Background information
- Born: Holiday Sidewinder Carmen-Sparks; 21 December 1990 (age 35); Sydney, Australia
- Genre: Pop
- Occupations: Musician; producer
- Instruments: Vocals; guitar; keyboards
- Years active: 2005–present
- Label: Personal Best
- Formerly of: Bridezilla
- Website: holidaysidewinder.com

Holiday Sidewinder Carmen-Sparks is an Australian-born indie pop singer-songwriter, musician and record producer. She was the founding lead singer of Bridezilla (2005–13). After that group disbanded Sidewinder relocated to England to start her solo career. Her debut album, Forever or Whatever, appeared in October 2019.

== Early years ==
Sidewinder was born on 21 December 1990 and raised in Sydney. Her mother, Lo Carmen, is a country soul singer-songwriter and actor, originally from Adelaide; while her step-father, Aden Young is a Canadian-Australian actor. Carmen and Young have had two other children. Her father, Jeremy Sparks, Carmen's then-partner, was a film set constructor and later worked as an engineer on the Sydney Olympics opening ceremony (2000), festivals and large public artworks (including Halo). In October 2019 she reflected on her upbringing, "I was raised by a colourful family completely entrenched in the entertainment industry; a complex group of eccentric individuals. My mother was a teenage actress who sang in bands, my dad was a set builder. My mother left my father for a wonderful woman (who was a singer). They raised me in the red light district of Darlinghurst in the 90s." Sidewinder's stepmother is Australian actress Claudia Karvan. Since living together, Karvan and Sparks have had two other children.

For secondary education, she attended Newtown High School of the Performing Arts and recalled working on music with a friend, "when we were 13 and both playing guitar, we started a band called Bridezilla." Her grandfather, musician Peter Head, provided the band's name.

== Bridezilla ==
Sidewinder, on lead vocals and guitar, formed Bridezilla in Sydney in 2005 with Josh Bush on drums, Pia May Courtley on lead guitar, Millie Hall on saxophone and keyboards, and Daisy Tulley on violin. Bush was a childhood friend, while Courtley, Hall and Tulley all attended her high school. They gained local popularity and were signed to Ivy League Records in 2007, and with Inertia Recordings by 2009. The group played festivals and opened for the Dirty Three, John Cale (of the Velvet Underground), Wilco, Stephen Malkmus (Pavement), the Drones, Interpol, and Sia. Nick Cave selected them to play at the All Tomorrows Parties Festival which he curated in Australia.

They released a five-track self-titled extended play (November 2007), a vinyl split single shared with the Tren Brothers (2019) and a sole full-length studio album, The First Dance (October 2009). The album was co-produced by Mark Kramer and Chris Townend. Their original material was co-written by all five members; Courtley explained to Louise McClean of The Blackmail, "Our song writing style has changed so much since the EP and that natural progression to a more sophisticated platforms equals more hard work. An album's such a vast playing field and there's much more room for vulnerabilities, strengths and weaknesses to show themselves. I think the personality of a band really comes to the fore." In 2010 the band went into hiatus for two years before resuming in mid-2012, they announced their imminent separation in December of that year and played their last show in the following month.

== Collaborations and other appearances ==
In October 2009 Sidewinder appeared on Season 7, Episode 93 of SBS-TV's music quiz and trivia show, RocKwiz. She performed a duet with Andrew Stockdale (of Wolfmother) on Stevie Nicks and Don Henley's 1981 song, "Leather & Lace". Since then she has re-appeared on the show and also joined RocKwiz live tours. From March to June 2010 on such a tour, she was recorded on solo cover versions of "Time" and "The Boat That I Row", and a duet with Dave Faulkner on "Pale Blue Eyes" on the album, RocKwiz National Tour 2010. Another duet was with Glenn Richards on "Just Like Christmas", which was broadcast for the RocKwiz 2009 Christmas Special in December of that year, but it was not released until 2011 as part of The RocKwiz Christmas Album. Her duet with Stockdale was issued on a DVD, Rockwiz Duets. With a Little Help from Our Friends. Volume IV, in 2014.

On 15 August 2014, Personal Best Records (co-owned by Josh Beagley [her uncle] and Mike Di Francesco), issued a single, "Born on the Wind", as her collaboration with PBO (the label's in-house production team), which was also the label's first release. It was co-written by Sidewinder, Beagley and Di Francesco. She described her inspiration for the lyrics, "I'd just been given a ring from grandmother that my grandfather had given to her in 1966 inscribed with 'born on the wind, by the wrath of the sea, under the sky's infinity'. So I imagined their romance where they would go on long drives in Western Australia and gave myself some poetic license... I think my grandfather romantically summated her character pretty well." Nic Kelly of project u described the track, "a dance-pop gem that sounds like it could easily fit on a Crystal Fighters album or maybe even a Van She one."

She was the featured vocalist on the track, "Girl", by Stay Bless in 2015. On 25 January 2016 she appeared on Jeremy Dylan's podcast, My Favorite Album, and talked about Bob Dylan's Pat Garrett & Billy the Kid. She had met Bob Dylan and Booker T. Jones, who plays bass guitar on that album. From 2017 to 2019 she was a touring member of Australian musician Alex Cameron's backing band. She provided keyboards and vocals live on Pitchfork's performance and interview series, Juan's Basement. and performed live with the Killers.

Holiday contributed a cover version of Darlene Love and Phil Spector's "Christmas (Baby Please Come Home)" to Valentine Recording Presents: A Christmas Miracle (23 December 2018); a collaborative benefit album by various artists for victims of that year's California Wildfires with other contributions from Cameron, Mac Demarco, Jack Ladder, Kirin J. Callinan and Weyes Blood. She is a guest vocalist on Callinan's album, Return to Center (June 2019), on the tracks "Life is Life" and "You Weren't in Love with Me", (for which she produced the accompanying music video, starring Andie MacDowell). Fred Nicolson of The A List described the latter track, "[her] harmonies in the chorus are lush and add to the track's overall appeal." She is a vocalist on Cameron's third studio album, Miami Memory (September 2019), for the tracks "Miami Memory", "Step-Dad" and "Divorce".

== Solo career ==
Sidewinder relocated to London in late 2012 to pursue a solo pop career; she briefly returned to Bridezilla for their final dates. She told Zac Bayly of Oyster magazine in August 2014, "The allure for me with pop music: it's universal and it shows that we're all human, that we all have these common feelings despite age, race, socio-economic backgrounds and all that. Pop is genuine. Although lots of pop songs are definitely calculated, there's something about the chemistry of them that gets a reaction from so many people." She explained why she left Bridezilla, "working with a team can be limiting, you know? In a group it's such a democracy and you're working towards a common goal and whatever, but everything's so laboured. This has been really quite emancipating for me."

In March 2014 she independently released a single, "Carousel", written with Mike Chapman (Blondie's producer) and shot the accompanying video on the Brighton Pier with choreographer Holly Blakey. Pop Justice premiered the track, with a contributor saying, "it sounds both completely demented and extremely brilliant." Robin Murray of Clash stated, "There's a sense of classicism here, in the way that Holiday can reconstitute languid, widescreen pop into something thrillingly new." Australian singer-songwriter Sia tweeted about the single, revealing that she used to babysit Sidewinder. The Hairpin's Jia Tolentino wrote, "I read somewhere that having Sia Furler as your babysitter means that you are contractually obligated to produce great pop music for the rest of your life, which explains this new single from Holiday Sidewinder, very much a kooky, cotton-candy, retro-dream-pop jam."

In March 2015 FBi Radio's Nicholas Watts interviewed Sidewinder and previewed her new material, including tracks with song writing and production team, Biffco; she described a song, "I wrote this in a church in the south of France, in the middle of a Sunflower field, having a kind of intercontinental love affair." In December 2016 she released a cover version of East 17's Christmas track, "Stay Another Day". Clash premiered the video which she directed herself, Murray described its, "glacial synths and sun-washed vocals." FMS-Mag's writer called it "another sparkling gem" from "a dreamy pop sensation." In October 2017 she released a single, "Casino", via through Personal Best Records. Sosefina Fuamoli of The AU Review observed, "this is a return we have been hanging out for ages... [it] heralds a new chapter for Holiday as she continues to mine the depths of some hectic psych infused disco-pop and present a final result that is almost insatiably good."

Paper's Justin Moran premiered the follow-up single, "Tra$h Can Luv", in February 2018, which he described: "Singer-songwriter [Sidewinder] has officially gone solo to become a global pop sensation... Her sound marries Debbie Harry nostalgia with Róisín Murphy experimentation, which comes together flawlessly on her new single. In August of that year she released "Leo", which Zeba Blay of HuffPost felt was a "pop-esque anthem about being an unapologetic heaux." The track appeared on Paper, together with an interview by Jhoni Jackson, where she explains, "I always write from experience and add a dose of fantasy. I was a hopeless and foolish romantic, frivolous cheater, and serial monogamist. Every relationship was bumper to bumper. So I am now conclusively (and for the foreseeable future) a free and empowered Sex-positive movement independent lover. Still learning though. Who knows what's next. Conflama for life, whether you like it or not." Harry Webber of Life Without Andy noticed that it was, "Addressing the double standards that women experience when it comes to the world of dating, normalising behaviour that for some reason has different implications based on your gender, encouraging strength and erasing shame – [she] is clearly not afraid to examine the burning issues facing many women in the world today. However, expressing these ideas in a four minute bubblegum pop video is her true masterstroke."

In May 2019 her single "Baby Oil" was released, which was featured in Guardian Australia's Nathan Jolly's 20 best Australian tracks of the month. He explained, "[it] is so effervescent you'll need an insulin shot from all the sugar, with a Game Boy-esque riff, drum machines from an 80s-imagined future, and the same sex-positive message that has shone from her past few solo singles. The guitar solo that closes the song would be at home on the Purple Rain soundtrack, as would the sultry lyrics. 'Baby Oil' feels like sneaking into an R-rated movie or listening to Madonna records and wondering what it all means – but feeling it nonetheless."

Sidewinder performed her original tracks, "Tra$h Can Luv", '"Baby-Oil", "Whispers" and "Leo" live on United Kingdom reality TV show, Made in Chelsea, Series 17 Episode 07. In May 2019 the title track, "Forever or Whatever", from her debut album was released. The Line of Best Fit's Olivia Swash premiered the track and wrote, "[she] slams picture-perfect 'keeping up with the Joneses' lifestyles... her droll lyrics take a swipe at the assumption that a nuclear family is the culmination of happiness, singing of white picket fences and four-wheel drives." She supported British rock band, the Feeling, on their twelfth anniversary tour of their debut album, Twelve Stops and Home.

Sidewinder's debut album, Forever or Whatever, appeared in October 2019 via Personal Best Records. Album of the Year's correspondent, TheBravesDH, felt, "her first batch of songs that shows she can fit right in with those others [Cameron and Callinan] in terms of wit and humor. These are funny, catchy songs that owe a lot to the synth pop of the 80's." Her second album Face of God followed in May 2021 on Lab78 Records, which was produced by Nick Littlemore (Lost Valentinos, Mercy Arms, Mika). Sidewinder partly based its lyrics on Littlemore's poetry and diaries. They made a rough recording of it over five days in a Hollywood studio, while Littlemore was also working on his indie project Two Leaves in 2016. Littlemore later reworked it with New York-based studio musicians. Face of God was described by Cat Woods of Audiofemme as "cosmic disco via transcendental dance, taking elements of psychedelic indie rock, electronica and new wave synths to result in a highly-referential, wholly new sonic playground."

== Personal life ==
In 2017 she launched an exercise company, Lovercise, in London with her personal trainer and then-boyfriend, Sapan Sehgal, and British entertainer and broadcast journalist, Carolyn Owlett. It was described by Andrea Thompson of Marie Claire as a "bespoke fitness class focussed around matchmaking like-minded singles." In an interview with Javita Lee of Black Magazine (NZ), in August 2018, she explained, "Well, I somehow ended up running a gym with my personal trainer (who became my boyfriend, of course). He was a Hindu Punjabi man and I lapped up his knowledge of Bollywood, muscles, and spirituality."

Sidewinder relocated to Hollywood late in 2017. She later briefly lived in Estonia and then Cyprus before settling in Thailand, as from May 2021. In 2019 Sidewinder had married in a private ceremony on a beach in Koh Samui, Thailand.

== Discography ==
=== Albums ===
List of albums
Title	Album details
Forever or Whatever	Released: 4 October 2019; Label: Personal Best (PBRCD11); Formats: CD, LP, DD, streaming
Face of God	Released: 21 May 2021; Label: Lab78; Formats: DD, streaming
The Last Resort	Released: 22 March 2024; Label: Venus Beach Records; Formats: DD, streaming

=== Singles ===
==== As lead artist ====
Title	Year	Album
"Carousel"	2014	Non-album singles
"Born on the Wind" (by Holiday Sidwinder and PBO)	2014	Non-album singles
"Stay Another Day"	2016	Non-album singles
"Casino"	2017	Forever or Whatever
"Tra$h Can Luv"	2018	Forever or Whatever
"Leo"	2018	Forever or Whatever
"Whispers"	2018	Forever or Whatever
"Baby Oil"	2019	Forever or Whatever
"Forever/Whatever"	2019	Forever or Whatever
"Kokomo"	2019	Non-album singles
"Another World"	2019	Non-album singles
"Lazy GF"	2020	Non-album singles
"Twin Flames"	2020	Non-album singles
"Red Right Hand"	2020	Non-album singles
"The Real Tea"	2020	Non-album singles
"Survive This"	2021	Non-album singles
"Into the Universe"	2021	Face of God

==== As featured artist ====
Title	Year	Album
"Girl" (Stay Bless featuring Holiday Sidewinder)	2014	Non-album singles
"Come Close" (Blackpaw featuring Holiday Sidewinder)	2021	Non-album singles
