= Pray TV =

Pray TV may refer to:

== Film and TV ==
- Pray TV (1980 film), comedy film spoofing televangelism starring Dabney Coleman
- Pray TV (1982 film), made-for-television drama film about televangelism starring John Ritter and Ned Beatty

== Music ==
- Pray TV (band), indie pop/Indie rock band from Melbourne, Australia
