= First Dance =

A first dance is the opening dance in various traditions.

First Dance may refer to:

- First Dance (EP), a 1995 EP by Michael Bublé
- "First Dance" (song), a 2009 song by Justin Bieber
- The First Dance, a 2009 album by Bridezilla
- First Dance (Reacher episode), a 2022 TV episode
