= Mr Floppy discography =

- Studio albums: 3
- EPs: 1
- Singles: 2

The discography of the Australian punk band Mr Floppy currently consists of one single, one EP and three albums.

== Albums ==
=== Breakfast ===
Breakfast

Studio album by Mr Floppy
- Released: 16 December 1991
- Recorded: Whirled Records, Melbourne, October 1990
- Genre: Oi!
- Length: 38:47
- Label: Waterfront

Breakfast is the debut album by Mr Floppy. It was released on 16 December 1991 and contains the tracks from their previous EP Firm and Fruity alongside three versions of a previously unreleased track, "Breakfast" (a parody of the Australian Crawl song "Reckless").

Track list
No.	Title	Length
1.	"Breakfast" (Manuel Mix)	3:37
2.	"Breakfast" (Cake Mix)	4:39
3.	"Homebrew"	3:26
4.	"Noonan"	2:46
5.	"Stir Fry Baby"	4:39
6.	"I Feel Sick"	1:33
7.	"Up the Duff"	3:03
8.	"God Loves You"	3:10
9.	"Breakfast" (Yes, we know it's too bloody long, but we like it that way, so you can go to buggery, edit)	11:55

=== Gratuitous ===
Gratuitous

Studio album by Mr Floppy
- Released: 1992
- Recorded: May 1992
- Genres: Oi!, rap rock
- Length: 20:47
- Label: Waterfront

Gratuitous is the second album by the band. It was released in 1992, and features a re-recording of "100 000 Morrisseys" in a rap rock-style, and a cover of the Yugoslavian beer drinking song, "The Tree in the Wood".

Track list
No.	Title	Length
1.	"Come Back, You Bitch"	3:29
2.	"The Tree in the Wood"	3:11
3.	"Coldsore"	2:13
4.	"Jelly Baby"	3:09
5.	"Daddy, What is That?"	4:13
6.	"Yes, That's Right"	2:49
7.	"100,000 Morrisseys"	1:43

=== The Unbearable Lightness of Being a Dickhead ===
The Unbearable Lightness of Being a Dickhead

Studio album by Mr Floppy
- Released: July 1993
- Recorded: Part 1: Laughter; Atlantis Studios, Melbourne; Part 2: Forgetting and Only a Story; The Big Pie, Moonee Ponds; Hidden Live Tracks; The Lansdowne, Sydney, 29 August 1992
- Genres: Alternative rock, oi!, neofolk
- Length: 67:47
- Label: Zombie Penis Death Classics

Released in 1993, The Unbearable Lightness of Being a Dickhead is the band's third and final album. The album contained two covers of "Wuthering Heights", originally by Kate Bush.

==== Track list ====
Part 1: Laughter
No.	Title	Length
1.	"Chew the Fat"	3:20
2.	"Get a Dog Up Ya"	2:59
3.	"Birdie Num Num"	4:51
4.	"Head Job"	3:09
5.	"Wuthering Heights"	3:06
6.	"Piss Off, You Witch"	3:42
7.	"Steak and Kidney Pie"	3:05
8.	Untitled	0:44

Part 2: Forgetting
No.	Title	Length
9.	"Boring Fart"	3:57
10.	"They Call Me Bruce"	2:51
11.	"The 1992 WS Cox Plate"	4:12
12.	"Sunflowers"	3:59

Only a Story
No.	Title	Length
13.	"Part 2: Kellar's Keep"	4:33
14.	"Part 3: The Dance of the Puppets"	4:53
15.	"Part 1: Return of the Witch Lord"	6:07
16.	Untitled	3:09

Live, Landsdowne Hotel, 29 August 1992
No.	Title	Length
17.	"I Feel Sick"	2:18
18.	"100 000 Morrisseys"	2:13
19.	"Noonan"	3:33
20.	Untitled	1:06

Track 8 is a sample from a porn film, with the stereo channels in inverse directions. Track 16 is an instrumental version of Wuthering Heights with no guitars, bass or drums. Track 20 is a minute of silence followed by someone saying "Floppy Floop". "Boring Fart" has the mantra Om mani padme hum chanted throughout. The lyrics to "Sunflowers" are taken from various letters written by Vincent van Gogh in the final years of his life.

== Singles and EPs ==
=== "100 000 Morrisseys" ===
"100 000 Morrisseys"

Single by Mr Floppy
- B-side: "Big Death"
- Released: 1989
- Recorded: 1989
- Genre: Alternative rock
- Length: 4:32
- Label: Zombie Penis Death
- Songwriters: Mick Carroll; Paul Johnson
- Producer: Keith Baxter

"100 000 Morrisseys" is the debut single by Mr Floppy. It was written by Tim Aylward and Paul Johnson. It was recorded and released in 1989 on the Zombie Penis Death label and was later reissued in 1990 on Waterfront. The single was produced by Keith Baxter and got negative reviews but was played on John Peel's radio show. It uses a sample of the beginning of "This Charming Man" and samples other Smiths songs throughout the track. The B-side is a 2-minute instrumental (except for the chorus). In 1992, it was released on the album Gratuitous in a re-recorded version in which the vocals were rapped.

==== Track list ====
No.	Title	Length
1.	"100 000 Morrisseys"	4:32
2.	"Big Death"	2:37

=== Firm and Fruity ===
Firm and Fruity

EP by Mr Floppy
- Released: 1990
- Recorded: Whirled Records, Melbourne, October 1990
- Genres: Oi!, psychedelic rock
- Length: 18:36
- Label: Waterfront

Firm and Fruity is the first extended play by Mr Floppy. It was released in 1990 and contains 6 tracks, despite 8 tracks being listed on the cover.

The track "Noonan" went on to be a fan favourite. Its chorus resembles that of "Cool for Cats" by the UK Squeeze.

==== Track list ====
All tracks are written by Paul Johnson and Tim Aylward.

No.	Title	Length
1.	"I Feel Sick"	1:36
2.	"Up the Duff"	3:03
3.	"God Loves You"	3:30
4.	"Homebrew"	3:26
5.	"Noonan"	2:46
6.	"Stir Fry Baby"	4:39

As well as the 6 tracks above, the tracks "She Bangs the Drum Machine" and "He Eat Like a Duck" are listed on the label.

"Up the Duff" samples a line from National Lampoon's European Vacation. "Stir Fry Baby" features an extended outro with duelling wah-wah solos from Aylward and Carroll. "God Loves You" samples the spoken intro ("I still believe in God, but God no longer believes in me") from The Mission's song "Wasteland".

Live versions of tracks 1 and 5 were included in the hidden track section of the album The Unbearable Lightness of Being a Dickhead. The entire EP was included on the album Breakfast. In 1991, a test pressing was made for a planned "Homebrew" single. It was never released to the public, however.

== Poontang* ==
Poontang*
- Origin: Melbourne, Victoria, Australia
- Genres: Alternative rock, punk rock, hard rock
- Years active: 1994–1999
- Label: Rectum Records
- Past members: Paul Johnson; Jonathan Rayson-Hill; Mick Betinsky; Hamish Cheyne

Poontang* were a band formed in 1994 by Paul Johnson (ex-Mr Floppy), Jonathan Rayson-Hill, Michael Betinsky and Hamish Cheyne. They never got as popular as Mr Floppy and in fact only played 23 concerts before disbanding in late 1999.

Musically, the group were a continuation of the hard rock cultivated by Johnson during Mr Floppy's twilight years.

=== Poonball ===
Poonball

Studio album by Poontang*
- Released: October 1998
- Recorded: 1996–1997, Rowdy Productions
- Genres: Hard rock, alternative rock
- Length: 44:25
- Label: Rectum Records

Poonball is the first and only album by Poontang*, released in October 1998.

==== Track list ====
No.	Title	Length
1.	"Wanker With a Pitbull"	2:55
2.	"Sensible Footware"	2:50
3.	"Bike"	3:26
4.	"Hommus"	2:28
5.	"Fitzroy Poet"	5:00
6.	"A Brief History of Time"	0:54
7.	"Hommoninity"	3:49
8.	"Pots and Pinnies"	3:01
9.	"No Penis"	4:19
10.	"Richard Gere's Brolly"	4:30
11.	"Jeffrey"	3:12
12.	"Swearing at the Empy"	1:29
13.	"Dickhead Junkie Loser"	3:16
14.	"Whore"	3:17
