= The Gingers =

Australian pop punk band

- Also known as: The Gingerettes
- Origin: Melbourne, Victoria, Australia
- Genres: Rock, punk, pop punk
- Years active: 2005–2008
- Label: Standard/Illicit
- Past members: Etta Curry; Nellie Jackson; Chelsea Wheatley; Christopher Kelly; Stephen Lavery

The Gingers were an Australian pop punk band which formed in early 2005 with Etta Curry on drums and vocals; Nellie Jackson on lead guitar, rhythm guitar and vocals; and Chelsea Wheatley on lead vocals, bass guitar and keyboards. They signed with Illicit Records, which issued a five-track extended play, Love You Long Time, in May 2006.

== History ==
The Gingers formed in Melbourne after the members had attended Falls Festival 2003: Etta Curry on drums and vocals; Nellie Jackson on lead guitar and vocals; and Chelsea Wheatley on lead vocals, bass guitar and keyboards. The group played their first show at The Tote with The Turbo AC's in February 2004. All three were aged 16 or 17 and completing year 12 at the same secondary school – they had been members of a four-piece group, Postal. Initially called The Gingerettes, they shortened the name to The Gingers after an early gig.

In 2004 The Gingers signed to Ralph Carr's Standard Records offshoot Illicit Records label – he had heard their website's demos. Indie Initiative website caught their gig in August and found that "the guitarist plays huge slabs of riffs, the drummer bangs away and the bass player sings and rocks. She is definitely a star. She has attitude and ability and teen sex appeal. The band is raw and needs work, but the energy and some of the songs come through well. The set was broken into two with the singer playing bass in one half and keyboards the other". In November they supported Spiderbait for a gig at the Forum Theatre.

The Gingers appeared at Push Over 2006 in mid-March, the all-ages concert included Grinspoon, Frenzal Rhomb and Butterfingers. In that month Craig Mathieson of The Age described their sound as "a spiky brew of punk daubed with electro impulses".

In May 2006 they released their debut extended play, Love You Long Time, which was produced by Lindsay Gravina (Jet, Thirsty Merc, Grinspoon, The Living End) and mixed at Birdland Studios, Melbourne. FasterLouder's reviewer found the EP was "extremely catchy, radio-friendly pop-rock with enough energy and girl-friendly subject matter to see the band win a large fan-base". They toured the east coast in support of the EP, and also appeared on CD:Live. Their music video for the track, "Evening Rose", was played on Channel V, Video Hits and Rage, with the track also aired on national radio stations Triple J, Nova and Community Radio. "Evening Rose" was also used in an ad for Jay Jay's.

In August they supported Pennywise, at a gig in Melbourne, on the Australian leg of the United States punk group's tour. The Gingers have also supported gigs by The Queers, Against Me!, Hoobastank (February 2007), and toured with Ground Components (October 2006), The Go Set, This War, and More.

The Gingers started 2007 by playing Peaches and Cream Festival and the Big Day Out in Melbourne. Stephen Lavery (ex-The Vaginals) joined on lead guitar and vocals while Jackson switched to rhythm guitar. In September that year The Gingers released a split EP, Giant Panda EP: The Goons of Doom Split The Gingers, with Sydney surf rock band, Goons of Doom, on half the tracks. The CD came free with Waves Magazine across Australia and was available on a joint tour by the bands across Australia's East Coast during September and October.

Late in 2007 Curry left the group to pursue education in the arts, the remaining members found it difficult to find a replacement, by February 2008 Christopher Kelly joined on drums. The Victorian Curriculum and Assessment Authority added "Evening Rose" to the approved list for their 2008 curriculum in the Victorian Certificate of Education subject Music: Group Performance. Also that year The Gingers supported Juliette Lewis and the Licks and recorded tracks for a new EP, with Indra Adams of Ground Components, however it was not released. The Gingers disbanded by the end of the year.

== Afterwards ==
From 2009 Curry has periodically performed as a DJ under the pseudonym, Etta Curry Suppression Ring (not to be confused with Eddy Current Suppression Ring), including performances at the Sandcastles Festival in January 2010; and Leaps and Bounds Festival in July 2013.

By early 2011 Chaos Kids, a punk rock duo, were formed by Curry on drums and lead vocals; and Jackson on guitar and lead vocals; which issued a track, "My Mind", on their website. It was the lead track of their self-titled four-track EP, which appeared on 10 February 2011 on Jackknife Music.

In January 2013 Jackson joined Joe McGuigan (ex-Ground Components) on lead vocals, and Eamon Stewart (Shoot The Sun) to form, Joseph Paul. According to Scott Fitzsimons they "employ electronic beats and synthesiser and embrace ... ska patterns".

Chelsea Wheatley went on to perform under the pseudonym of Chela. She released an EP, Romanticise, through Kitsuné. Performing electro pop, she has also appeared on dance tracks by Clubfeet, Viceroy and Goldroom.

== Members ==
- Etta Curry – drums, vocals
- Nellie Jackson – lead guitar, rhythm guitar, vocals
- Chelsea Wheatley – lead vocals, bass guitar
- Stephen Lavery – lead guitar, vocals
- Christopher Kelly – drums

== Discography ==
=== Extended plays ===
- Demo - Melbourne Records (2005)
- Love You Long Time (2006)
- The Goons of Doom Split The Gingers Giant Panda (4 September 2007)
