= The First Dance =

Studio album by Bridezilla
- Released: 6 November 2009
- Genre: Alternative, Indie, Indie Folk
- Length: 46:16
- Label: Inertia Recordings

Bridezilla chronology
Bridezilla EP (2007)	The First Dance (2009)

The First Dance is the debut studio album by the indie folk band Bridezilla.

== Release ==
The album was released on 6 November 2009 in Australia. There are fourteen tracks on the album, with a fifteenth bonus track available on iTunes. It was produced and engineered by Kramer (musician).

== Track listing ==
No.	Title	Length
1.	"Lunar Eclipse"	3:09
2.	"Beaches"	2:25
3.	"Queen Of Hearts"	2:56
4.	"Speaking To Soft Toys"	2:38
5.	"Tailback"	2:19
6.	"Shipping Man"	2:38
7.	"Heart You Hold"	5:02
8.	"Soft Porn"	4:07
9.	"Magnetic Arrest"	3:46
10.	"Lottery Tickets"	3:16
11.	"Western Front"	2:35
12.	"Forth & Fine"	3:20
13.	"White Feather"	2:33
14.	"The Last Dance"	3:00
Total length:		46:16

iTunes Bonus Track
No.	Title	Length
14.	"He Fires At Me"	2:30

== Critical reception ==
Professional ratings
Review scores
Source	Rating
X-Press Magazine	(favourable)
Drone Magazine	(favourable)
BMA Magazine	(favourable)
Sputnik Music	3/5 stars
Oyster Mag	(favourable)
Soulshine Music	5/5 stars
Rave Magazine	3.5/5 stars
The AU Review	9.5/10 stars
iTunes Ratings	4.5/5 stars

The album garnered mostly positive reviews. The AU Review talks of their unique sound – "a sultry mix of folk inspired rock and roll, The First Dance is gentle but strong, holding an understated power, a subtle strength that many bands lack". Mac Easton at Soulshine speaks favourably, "The First Dance is a musical moment to be absolutely savoured." "The album – anything but raucous – lures the listener to the same state felt on a relaxed yet contemplative summer's afternoon," says Drone Magazine.

== Personnel ==
- Holiday Sidewinder – Vocals, Guitar
- Pia May – Guitar
- Josh Bush – Drums
- Millie Hall – Saxophone, Keyboards
- Daisy Tulley – Violin
