= Love Outside Andromeda (album) =

Studio album by Love Outside Andromeda
- Released: 6 September 2004
- Recorded: January–June 2004
- Genre: Indie rock
- Length: 44:06
- Label: Shock
- Producer: Shane O'Mara; Love Outside Andromeda

Love Outside Andromeda chronology
Something White and Sigmund (2003)	Love Outside Andromeda (2004)	Longing Was a Safe Place to Hide (2006)

Love Outside Andromeda is the debut, self-titled album by Australian indie rock band, Love Outside Andromeda. It was released in September 2004, which peaked at No. 77 on the ARIA Albums Chart. The album consists of twelve tracks and includes experiments with a wide variety of time signatures. The track, "Boxcutter, Baby", was written about the Sasebo slashing.

== Reception ==
Professional ratings
Review scores
Source	Rating
Triple J	4.0/5 stars

National youth radio station, Triple J, declared Love Outside Andromeda to be their Album of the Week upon its release.

== Track listing ==
All tracks are written by Sianna Lee.

1. "Tongue Like a Tether" – 3:28
2. "Made of Broken Glass" – 3:55
3. "Gonna Try to Be a Girl" – 2:26
4. "Boxcutter, Baby" – 4:54
5. "Something White and Sigmund" – 3:55
6. "Your Baby, My Blood" – 3:34
7. "Hecate Pose" – 3:50
8. "Chameleon" – 4:15
9. "Improper Methods" – 4:11
10. "Juno" – 3:35
11. "If You Really Want So Little from Me" – 2:07
12. "Achilles (All 3)" – 3:50

== Personnel ==
- Sianna Lee – vocals and guitar
- Jamie Slocombe – guitar and vocals
- Jesse Lee – bass
- Joe Hammond – drums and gong
- Alastair Watts – cello on tracks 4, 7, 8, 11

== Charts ==
Chart performance for Love Outside Andromeda
Chart (2004)	Peak position
Australian Albums (ARIA)	77
