= Umabel =

EP by Love Outside Andromeda
- Released: 2001
- Genre: Indie rock
- Length: 15:31
- Label: Shock Records
- Producer: Shane O'Mara and Love Outside Andromeda

Love Outside Andromeda chronology
Umabel (2001)	Something White and Sigmund (2003)

Umabel was the debut EP release by Australian indie rock band Love Outside Andromeda, on Shock Records in 2003. It was recorded at Bootfull Audio by Matthew Dufty, and the cover art is by Matthew Chapman.

== Track listing ==
Tracks 1, 2 and 4 were written by Sianna Lee; track 3 was written by Jamie Slocombe. Arrangements were by Love Outside Andromeda.

1. "Umabel" – 5:10
2. "Back of My Head" – 3:33
3. "New Dawn" – 3:49
4. "Raido" (Acoustic) – 2:59

=== Instruments ===
- Sianna Lee - Vocals and guitar
- Jamie Slocombe - Vocals and guitar
- Jesse Lee - Bass
- Joe Hammond - Drums
- Tihm Harvey - Guitar
