= Longing Was a Safe Place to Hide =

Studio album by Love Outside Andromeda
- Released: 18 September 2006
- Recorded: 2005–06
- Studio: Melbourne
- Genre: Pop rock
- Length: 41:06
- Label: Shock
- Producers: Tony Cohen; Russell Fawcus

Love Outside Andromeda chronology
Love Outside Andromeda (2004)	Longing Was a Safe Place to Hide (2006)

Longing Was a Safe Place to Hide is the second studio album by Australian pop-rock band Love Outside Andromeda, released on 18 September 2006. It peaked at No. 8 on the ARIA Hitseekers Albums chart. Overall, it is significantly mellower than their self-titled debut, distancing itself from some of the more frantic songs.

Lead single, "Bound by Hurt Dissolved", received radio play in late 2005, and later singles, "Measuring Tape" and "Sparrow", began to receive play in July to August 2006, closer to the album's appearance. Its title is a lyric from the fourth track, "A Room Full of People". The group effectively disbanded in December 2006, with an announcement of the hiatus on their website, "we've decided it's time to take a serious break. Effective immediately."

== Track listing ==
Shock Records (LOA004) All tracks are written by Sianna Lee, except as noted.

1. "Razor Stone Free" – 2:06
2. "Enora" – 4:05
3. "Bound by Hurt Dissolved" – 3:43
4. "A Room Full of People" – 3:16
5. "Sparrow" – 2:48
6. "Keep Looking at the Sky" (S Lee, Joseph Hammond) – 4:17
7. "You and Me Amplified" – 2:45
8. "Measuring Tape" – 3:36
9. "Hook in My Throat" – 3:28
10. "Past Tense (But a Prayer Nonetheless)" (Jamie Slocombe, S Lee, Hammond) – 7:32
11. "A Pretty Girl for a Power Game" – 3:26

== Personnel ==
Love Outside Andromeda

- Jesse Lee – bass guitar, double bass, keyboards, guitar
- Jamie Slocombe – guitar, keyboards, backing vocals, percussion, horns arranger
- Joseph Hammond – drums, keyboards, guitars, backing vocals, percussion, horns arranger
- Sianna Lee – lead vocals, guitars, keyboards

Other musicians

- Alastair Watts – cello, double bass, extra keyboards, strings arranger
- Russell Fawcus – violin
- Raphael Hammond – trumpet
- Sebastian Hammond – saxophone
- Raph, Cedric, Ali, Jeremy Lee, Ashleigh Flanders – backing vocals (track 11)

Production work

- Producer – Tony Cohen, Russell Fawcus
