= Something White and Sigmund =

EP by Andromeda
- Released: July 2003
- Recorded: April–June 2002
- Genre: Indie rock
- Length: 20:18
- Label: Shock
- Producer: Shane O'Mara; Andromeda

Andromeda chronology
Umabel (2001)	Something White and Sigmund (2003)	Love Outside Andromeda (2004)

Something White and Sigmund is the second extended play by Australian indie rock band, Andromeda, released in July 2003 on Shock Records. It peaked at number 10 on the ARIA Hitseekers Singles Chart. Soon after release, the group changed its name to Love Outside Andromeda, to avoid confusion with another band, and re-released the EP under the new name.

== Track listing ==
All tracks written by Sianna Naji; arrangements by Andromeda.

1. "Something White and Sigmund" – 4:03
2. "Mercury 2 Degrees" – 4:42
3. "Raido" – 4:29
4. "Third Dimension Colour Scene" – 3:03
5. "Starseeds" – 4:01

=== Instruments ===
- Sianna Lee - Vocals, guitar and keyboard
- Jamie Slocombe - Guitar and vocals
- Jesse Lee - Bass
- Joe Hammond - Drums, percussion and backing vocals
- Tihm Harvey - Keyboard on track 2, guitar on track 5
- Raph Hammond - Trumpet on track 3
