= Rail (Australian band) =

Australian indie pop band

- Also known as: Sleeper; Fragment
- Origin: Melbourne, Victoria, Australia
- Genres: Indie guitar pop
- Years active: 1993–1998
- Labels: White/Mushroom/Festival; White/Mushroom/Sony
- Past members: Ashley Naylor; David Sayer; Dan Vertessy; Ian Williams; Dan O'Halloran; Craig Sayer

Rail were an Australian indie guitar pop group, which formed in 1993 as Sleeper. In 1994 they changed their name, first to Fragment and then to Rail. The initial line-up was Ashley Naylor on guitar and vocals, David Sayer on bass guitar, Dan Vertessy on vocals and guitar, and Ian Williams on drums. They released two albums, Bad Hair Life (1995) and Goodbye Surfing Hello God! (1997). At the ARIA Music Awards of 1996 they were nominated for Best New Talent for Bad Hair Life, while its lead single, "Immune Deficiency", was nominated for Breakthrough Artist – Single. The group disbanded in late 1998. Ian Gregory Williams died, by drowning, in mid-1999, aged 28.

== History ==
=== 1993: Sleeper EP ===
Rail were an Australian indie guitar pop group from Melbourne, during the 1990s. They were formed in 1993 by Ashley Naylor on lead guitar and vocals (ex-Swarm, from 1994 he was contemporaneously a member of Even), David Sayer on bass guitar and backing vocals, Danny Richard Vertessy on lead vocals and guitar, and Ian Williams on drums and backing vocals. Vertessy and Williams had played together in the Wick Effect from 1990 to 1992. Williams was also a member of Melbourne Indie guitar band Raw Nerves ~91-93.

Rail were originally named Sleeper and released a six-track, self-titled extended play (EP) in March 1994. Triple J picked up the track, "Spinning Ball", from Sleeper, and the track was later included on their debut album. They changed their name to Fragment to avoid confusion with a United Kingdom band (see Sleeper). As Fragment they recorded a track, "Careering", for rooArt's Youngblood 4 (1994) compilation before settling on the name Rail. They signed to Mushroom Records' imprint, White Label, in that year.

=== 1994–1996: Bad Hair Life ===
Their debut album, Bad Hair Life was released in September 1994 and was critically acclaimed. Barry Divola of Who Weekly (November 1995) declared, "Vertessy has a delicious drawl of a voice... Rail are world weary without being total boring losers. The refrain of 'Immune Deficiency' is an irresistible sing-along rather than a dirge, while 'Rock Dreams' is a scrawled tale of faded flannelette reading about rock stars." Rolling Stone's yearbook for 1995 includes, "another triumph for the kind of pop songwriting which doesn't rely on overdrive to make it's [sic] point. These guys used their imaginations first, volume knobs second, and came up with one of the more interesting production jobs of the year as a result."

The album's lead single, "Immune Deficiency", was released in August 1995, which received high rotation on radio and TV on the Australian Broadcasting Corporation (ABC), especially on national youth radio, Triple J. The lyrics, by Vertessy, are written from the point of view of a person with HIV/AIDS. It was listed at No. 72 in Triple J Hottest 100, 1995. At the ARIA Music Awards of 1996 they were nominated for Best New Talent for Bad Hair Life, while "Immune Deficiency" was nominated for ARIA Award for Breakthrough Artist – Single. Rail performed at the South by South West Conference & Festival in Austin, Texas in 1996.

=== 1997–1998: Goodbye Surfing, Hello God ===
The second album, Goodbye Surfing, Hello God was released in May 1997. It was named after a Brian Wilson reference, was recorded in mid-1996 at Sing Sing Studios, Melbourne with New York producer Don Fleming (Teenage Fanclub, the Posies, Sonic Youth). Fleming described how, "Producing is psychology. Every band is different, there's different personalities. There's trouble makers, fuck ups, analytical ones... you have to dig your way through." The album was influenced by Neil Young, Alex Chilton, Big Star, the Posies, Swervedriver, Teenage Fanclub: all of whom Rail had supported.

Simon Woolridge of Juice felt, "[this] is comparatively live and off the cuff as opposed to Bad Hair Life's painstaking genesis. And it's [sic] lyrics are written from a fictional perspective, Vertessy now having experienced the responsibilities of song writing which involved fans expecting him to play the part of the protagonist in his songs." Rolling Stone's Tracey Grimson discussed how the album, "courses the spectrum of moods, through melancholy lamentations on love to the forthright embrace of power, drive and strength. It's there in the songs, from the classic rollicking rock of 'Sun Shiny Day' to the gentle balladry of 'Hey Little Beauty Queen'. 'My Art' takes a ride through country; the single 'I Am Awake' is honest heart-on-sleeve sweetness with a soaring chorus".

It was Naylor's final recording session with the band as he had left by October 1996 to concentrate on his main band, Even. Most of the group's work was written by Vertessy. Dan O'Halloran (ex-Saidaside) replaced Naylor on guitar in 1997. O'Halloran left the band in mid-1998 and they performed as trio with occasional inclusion of keyboardist, Craig Sayer. Rail performed at The Big Day Out, Melbourne and at The Falls Festival. TV performances include Channel 31 Melbourne, ABC TV's Recovery (as the featured band) and programming of an episode of Rage in 1996. The group split up in late 1998. Drummer Ian Williams drowned in mid-1999, aged 28.

== Members ==
- Ashley Naylor – lead guitar, vocals (1993–96)
- David Sayer – bass guitar, backing vocals (1993–98)
- Daniel Richard Vertessy – lead vocals, guitar (1993–98)
- Ian Gregory Williams – drums, backing vocals (1993–98) died 1999
- Dan O'Halloran – guitar (1997–98)
- Craig Sayer – keyboards (1998)

== Discography ==
=== Albums ===
Title	Details
Bad Hair Life	Released: September 1994; Label: Mushroom Records/Festival Records (D24432); Format: CD
Goodbye Surfing Hello God!	Released: May 1997; Label: White/Mushroom Records (MUSH33006-2); Format: CD

=== Extended plays ===
Title	Details
Sleeper (as Sleeper)	Released: March 1994; Label: MDS/Bliss Inc (BLISS1); Format: CD

=== Singles ===
Title	Year	Album
"Immune Deficiency"	1995	Bad Hair Life
"Freebird"	1996	Bad Hair Life
"Never Whole"	1996	Bad Hair Life
I Am Awake"	1997	Goodbye Surfing Hello God!
"Relapse"	1997	Goodbye Surfing Hello God!

== Awards and nominations ==
=== ARIA Music Awards ===
The ARIA Music Awards is an annual awards ceremony that recognises excellence, innovation, and achievement across all genres of Australian music. They commenced in 1987.

Year	Nominee / work	Award	Result	Ref.
ARIA Music Awards of 1996	Bad Hair Life	Best New Talent	Nominated	
ARIA Music Awards of 1996	"Immune Deficiency"	Breakthrough Artist – Single	Nominated	
