= Ashley Naylor =

Australian musician (born 11 February 1970)

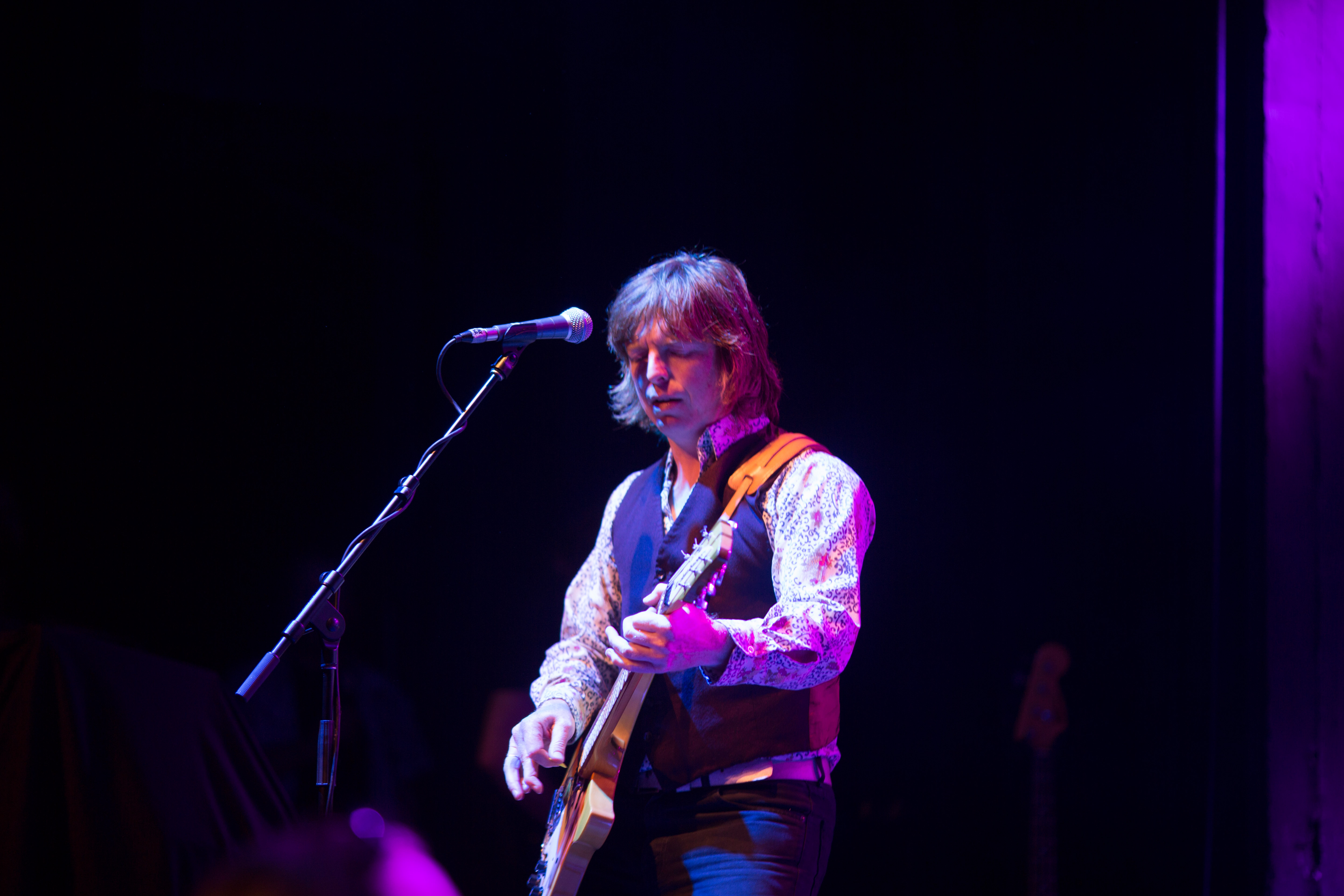
- Naylor in April 2013

Background information
- Born: Ashley John Naylor; 1970 (age 55–56); Australia
- Genres: Rock, indie rock
- Occupations: Singer, guitarist, songwriter
- Instruments: Vocals, guitar
- Years active: 1987–present
- Labels: Rubber Records, El Reno Music, White Label, Festival Mushroom, Off the Hip, Interstate 40 Music, Elephant Stone

Ashley John Naylor (born 1970) is an Australian musician, best known for his guitar and vocals in Melbourne-based band Even.

In 1987 at the age of 17, Naylor played guitar in Melbourne indie rock band The Swarm, whose bassist Tim Aylward was best known as guitarist for Mr Floppy between 1989 and 1994. He occasionally played guitar with Melbourne band Pray TV on studio recordings and also live. In 1994 he formed Even with Matthew Cotter, whom he had played with in Swarm, and bass player Wally Kempton of The Meanies. In 1995, Naylor was playing with both Even and Fragment, who later changed their name to Rail, a group fronted by Naylor's songwriting friend Danny Vertessy, turning his main focus to Even by 1998.

In 1999 Naylor created another side band, The Grapes, with singer Sherry Rich. In 1999 he contributed guitar to Stephen Cummings' Spiritual Burn album. He also played with the Countdown Spectacular's house band. In 2006, together with Cameron Bruce, he joined Paul Kelly's touring band, replacing Dan Luscombe, who left to join The Drones. Naylor released his debut solo album, Four Track Mind, in 2004 on El Reno Records, later released in September 2006 in the USA on Elephant Stone Records. He also plays guitar in a band with Spiderbait drummer-vocalist Kram, in The Ronson Hangup and in the Manta Trio. Naylor released his second solo album High Horse in November 2011 on El Reno Music. In 2016 Naylor joined The Stems.

In 2015 and 2016 he was guitarist for the RocKwiz 'Orkestra', the house band for the TV music trivia quiz RocKwiz.

In February 2020 Naylor joined Australian band The Church.

Naylor is not related to fellow Australian guitarist Tony Naylor of the Bootleg Family Band.

== Discography ==
=== Albums ===
Title	Details
Ashley Naylor's Four Track Mind	Released: 2006; Label: El Reno (ER001); Format: CD
High Horse	Released: 2011; Label: El Reno (ER005); Format: CD, DD, LP
Soundtracks Volume 1	Released: 2020; Label: El Reno (ER024); Format: DD, LP, streaming
Soundtracks Volume 2	Released: 2023; Label: El Reno (ER???); Format: DD, LP, streaming
