= Bridezilla (band) =

Australian experimental band (2005–2013)

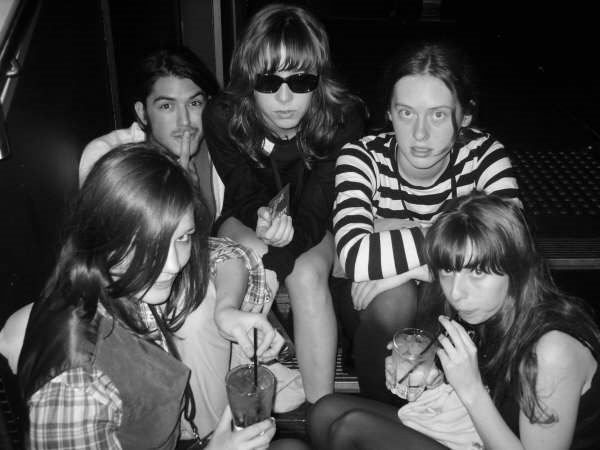

Background information
- Origin: Sydney, New South Wales, Australia
- Genres: Experimental, classical, melodramatic pop
- Years active: 2005–2013
- Labels: Ivy League Records, Inertia
- Past members: Holiday Sidewinder; Pia May; Daisy Tulley; Millie Hall; Josh Bush

Bridezilla were an Australian experimental band from Sydney formed in 2005, during their early years of high school. They played their farewell show at the Oxford Arts Factory on 16 January 2013.

The band composed of vocalist Holiday Sidewinder, Pia May, the band's guitarist, Millie Hall on Saxophone, Daisy Tulley on violin, and drummer Josh Bush.

In September 2007, the band signed with Ivy League Records and released their debut EP on 24 November 2007. In February 2009, they signed to Inertia (independent record company) with in-house label Inertia Recordings, and released their debut full-length album The First Dance on 30 October 2009.

== Touring and press ==
Over 6 years of touring the band played supports for The Dirty Three, John Cale (The Velvet Underground), Wilco, Stephen Malkmus (Pavement), The Drones, Interpol, Sia and many more.

They were billed on numerous festivals: The Great Escape (festival), Big Day Out, Homebake, Splendour in the Grass, The Mt. Buller and Cockatoo Island Nick Cave and The Bad Seeds curated All Tomorrow's Parties (music festival) and the New York All Tomorrow's Parties (music festival) 2009 curated by The Flaming Lips.

The band were featured in the September 2007 edition of Australian Rolling Stone.

Bridezilla announced their "inevitable departure and divorce" in December 2012.

== Discography ==
=== Albums ===
Title	Details
The First Dance	Released: 30 October 2009; Label: Inertia Recordings; Format: CD, digital download

=== EPs ===
Title	Details
Bridezilla	Released: 24 November 2007; Label: Ivy League Records; Format: CD, digital download

== Awards ==
=== AIR Awards ===
The Australian Independent Record Awards (commonly known informally as AIR Awards) is an annual awards night to recognise, promote and celebrate the success of Australia's Independent Music sector.

Year	Nominee / work	Award	Result
2010	themselves	Breakthrough Independent Artist	Nominated
