= Love Outside Andromeda =

Australian indie rock band

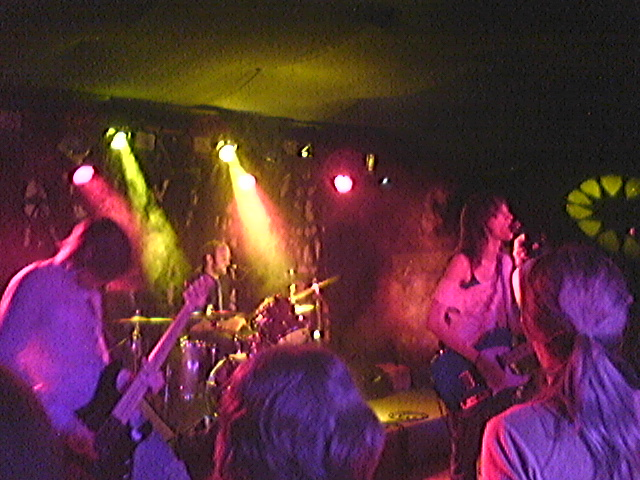
- Love Outside Andromeda performing at the Green Room

Background information
- Origin: Melbourne, Australia
- Genres: Indie rock
- Years active: 2000–2007, 2019, 2023–present
- Labels: Shock
- Members: Sianna Lee; Jamie Slocombe; Jesse Lee
- Past members: Peter Lee; Tim Harvey; Joe Hammond
- Website: loveoutsideandromeda.com.au

Love Outside Andromeda is an indie rock band from Melbourne, Australia. The band was formed in 2000 as Andromeda, and they released their debut EP, Umabel, in 2001. The title track from their second EP, Something White and Sigmund, appeared on the Triple J Hottest 100 2003 at No. 65. The band changed their name to Love Outside Andromeda to avoid confusion with the Swedish band of the same name. Over the following years, the band released two studio albums: Love Outside Andromeda (2004) and Longing Was a Safe Place to Hide (2006), both on Shock Records.

The band announced a hiatus at the start of 2007, ultimately breaking up. It reunited for a one-off show in 2019 as part of Melbourne Music Week, and digitally released an EP containing demos from 2003 to 2005. The band reformed in the early 2020s and released a third album, Stella Interrupted, in 2024.

== Members ==
- Sianna Lee (vocals, guitar)
- Jamie Slocombe (guitar, vocals)
- Jesse Lee (bass)

== Discography ==
=== Albums ===
List of albums, with selected chart positions
Title	Album details	Peak chart positions
Title	Album details	AUS
Love Outside Andromeda	Released: September 2004; Format: CD; Label: Shock (LOA003)	74
Longing Was a Safe Place to Hide	Released: September 2006; Format: CD; Label: Shock	
Stella Interrupted	Released: April 2024; Format: Digital	—

=== Extended plays ===
- Umabel (2001)
- Something White and Sigmund (2003)
- Acoustic Demos 2003–2005 (2019)

=== Promotional singles ===
- "Gonna Try to Be a Girl" (2004)
- "Boxcutter, Baby" (2004)
- "Bound by Hurt Dissolved" (2005)
- "Measuring Tape" (2006)
- "Keep Looking at the Sky" (2006)
