= Pray TV (band) =

Australian indie band

- Origin: Melbourne, Australia
- Genres: Indie pop, Indie rock
- Years active: 1987–1997, 2015, 2016–present
- Labels: Shock, The Hypnotized Label, Au Go Go, Radioactive, Mr Spaceman
- Members: Aidan Halloran; Martin Kennedy; Joseph Kennedy; Russell Baricevic
- Past members: Matt Scully; Pat Burke; Ashley Naylor; Damian Percy; Vicky Guglielmo; Colin Rivenell
- Website: praytvband.com

Pray TV were an indie pop/indie rock band from Melbourne, Australia. They existed from 1987 until their breakup in 1997. They released four studio albums. A compilation CD was released in 2010. The band reformed for a one-off reunion show at the Yarra Hotel in Abbotsford (Melbourne) on 31 January 2015. After 20 years since their last recording, the band released a new album in August 2016, titled Horizontal Life.

== History ==
=== 1987–1991: Formation and Flux ===
Pray TV began in 1987 in Melbourne. The band's early sound was described as "songs that have a lot of energy and rock along with power, yet they project this depressive mood that most bands can only get by playing slow. It's a neat trick.'" The band had various members over the years, with the only consistent members being Aidan Halloran (vocals) and Martin Kennedy (guitar/bass). Joseph Kennedy, Martin's brother, was the drummer for most of the band's existence.

Their debut 7" vinyl only single "In My Street", along with the 6 track, 12" vinyl only EP Sure were released in 1989 on Mr Spaceman. Both of these releases were recorded by Perri and Bo at the Phantom Tollbooth in Carlton, Melbourne. Shortly after these releases, Kennedy joined Ascot Vale band Mr Floppy as drummer, but left shortly after. The 7" vinyl only single "Spent" was released by Au Go Go Records in 1990. The 7" vinyl only single "Cold Dog Strew" was released in 1991 on Shock Records and was lifted from their debut CD LP Flux of the same year.

=== 1992–1997: Paydirt, Swinger's Paradise & Westona ===
Pray TV's second album Paydirt was released on Shock Records in 1992. The album included a bonus track of the band covering the Hüsker Dü song "Sorry Somehow", which was also regularly performed live. The released was followed by a series of shows in New York and Los Angeles with Radioactive label mates Live.

In 1992, Pray TV featured on a CD called Dress Ups (Shock Records) with other Melbourne bands, The Glory Box and The Fauves, with each band performing a track from the others repertoire, as well as contributing one original track. Melbourne band Ripe were also intended to take part but did not due to other recording commitments.

In January 1994, they supported The Smashing Pumpkins at the Prince of Wales in St Kilda, Melbourne. Their third album Swinger's Paradise was released on Concubine Records in 1995. It was produced by Ed Kuepper. On 27 July 1995 they performed on the RMITV show Under Melbourne Tonight

Their fourth studio album Westona was released on The Hypnotized Label in 1996 and apart from Halloran and Kennedy, featured a new guitarist and drummer as well as new bass player Russell Baricevic, formerly of Geelong band Bored!. Pray TV disbanded in 1997 with a farewell show at the Public Bar in North Melbourne.

=== 2015–present: Reunion and Horizontal Life ===
The band reformed for a one-off reunion show at the Yarra Hotel in Abbotsford on 31 January 2015, with the line-up of Martin and Joseph Kennedy, Halloran and Baricevic.

After 20 years since their last recording, the band released a new album in August 2016, titled Horizontal Life. The album was launched at the Grace Darling Hotel in Collingwood, Melbourne on 10 September 2016, with support from The Glory Box.

== Discography ==
=== Studio albums ===
Title	Details
Flux	Released: 1991; Label: Shock (SHOCK 008); Format: CD, LP
Paydirt	Released: 1992; Label: Shock (SHOCKCD0021); Format: CD, LP
Swinger's Paradise	Released: 1995; Label: Concubine Records (album 005); Format: CD
Westona	Released: 1996; Label: The Hypnotized Label(HIP018CD); Format: CD
Horizontal Life	Released: July 2016; Label: Pray TV (PRAYTV001); Format: CD, DD

=== Compilation albums ===
Title	Details
Lost Transmissions 1987-1996	Released: 2010; Label: Pray TV; Format: CD, DD
Learning to Breathe	Released: December 2016; Label: Pray TV; Format: DD; Note: Demos and B-Sides

=== Extended plays ===
Title	Details
Sure	Released: 1989; Label: Mr. Spaceman (MRSM 16); Format: 12" LP
Dress Ups (with The Fauves & The Glory Box)	Released: October 1992; Label: Shock (ShockCD0023); Format: CD

=== Singles ===
Title	Year	Album
"In My Street"	1989	non album single
"Cold Dog Strew"	1991	Flux
"Spent"	1991	Flux
"Aftermath"	1992	Paydirt
"Sucker Punch"	1994	Swingers Paridise
"All The Way"	1995	Swingers Paridise
