= Jess McAvoy =

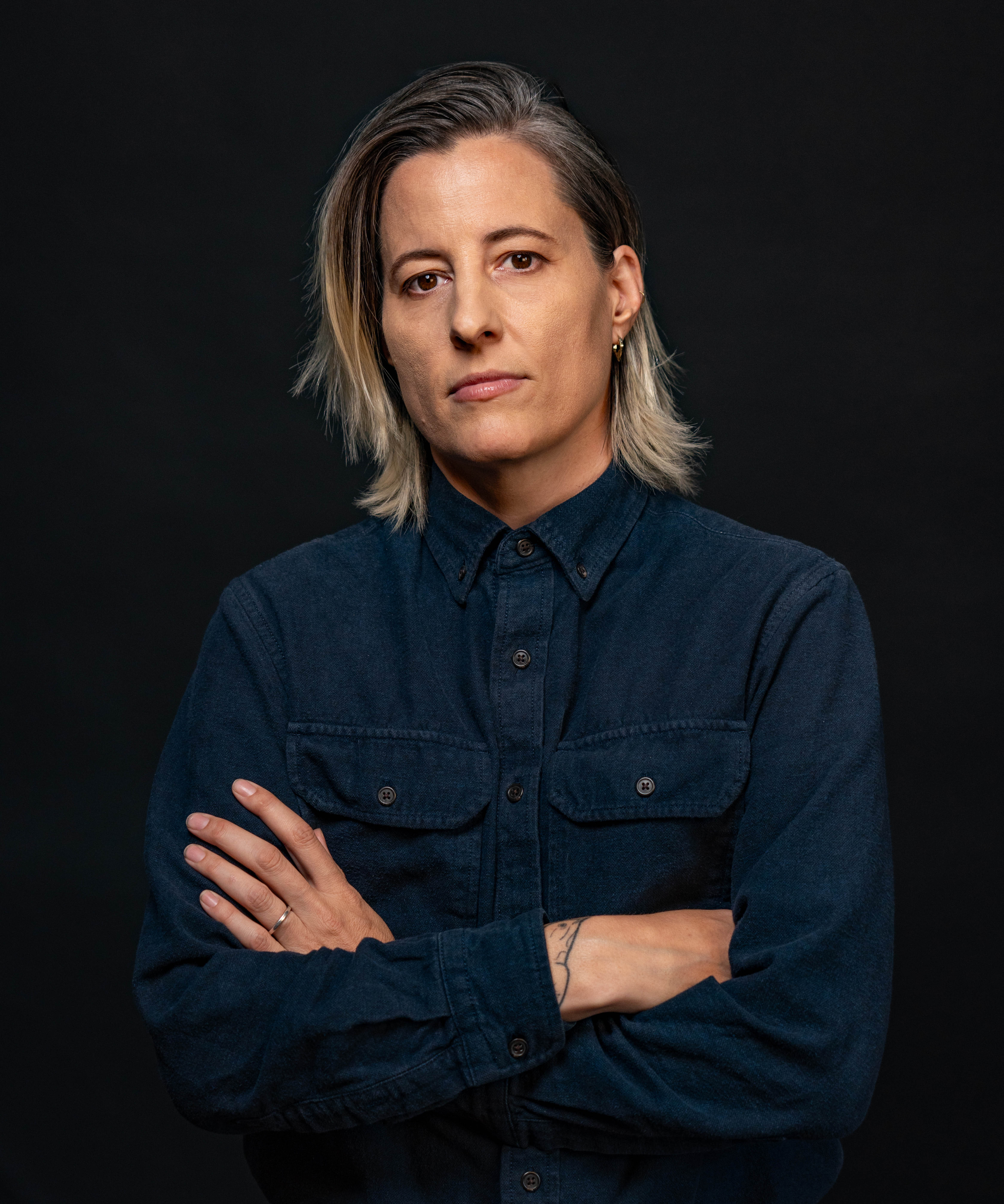

Background information
- Born: Jesse James H McAvoy; 11 January 1980 (age 46); Perth, Western Australia, Australia
- Origin: Melbourne, Victoria, Australia
- Genres: folk, pop, rock, blues, indie
- Occupations: Performing artist, songwriter, musician
- Instruments: Guitar, vocals, piano, drums
- Years active: 1996–present
- Label: Henduwin/independent
- Website: jessmcavoy.com

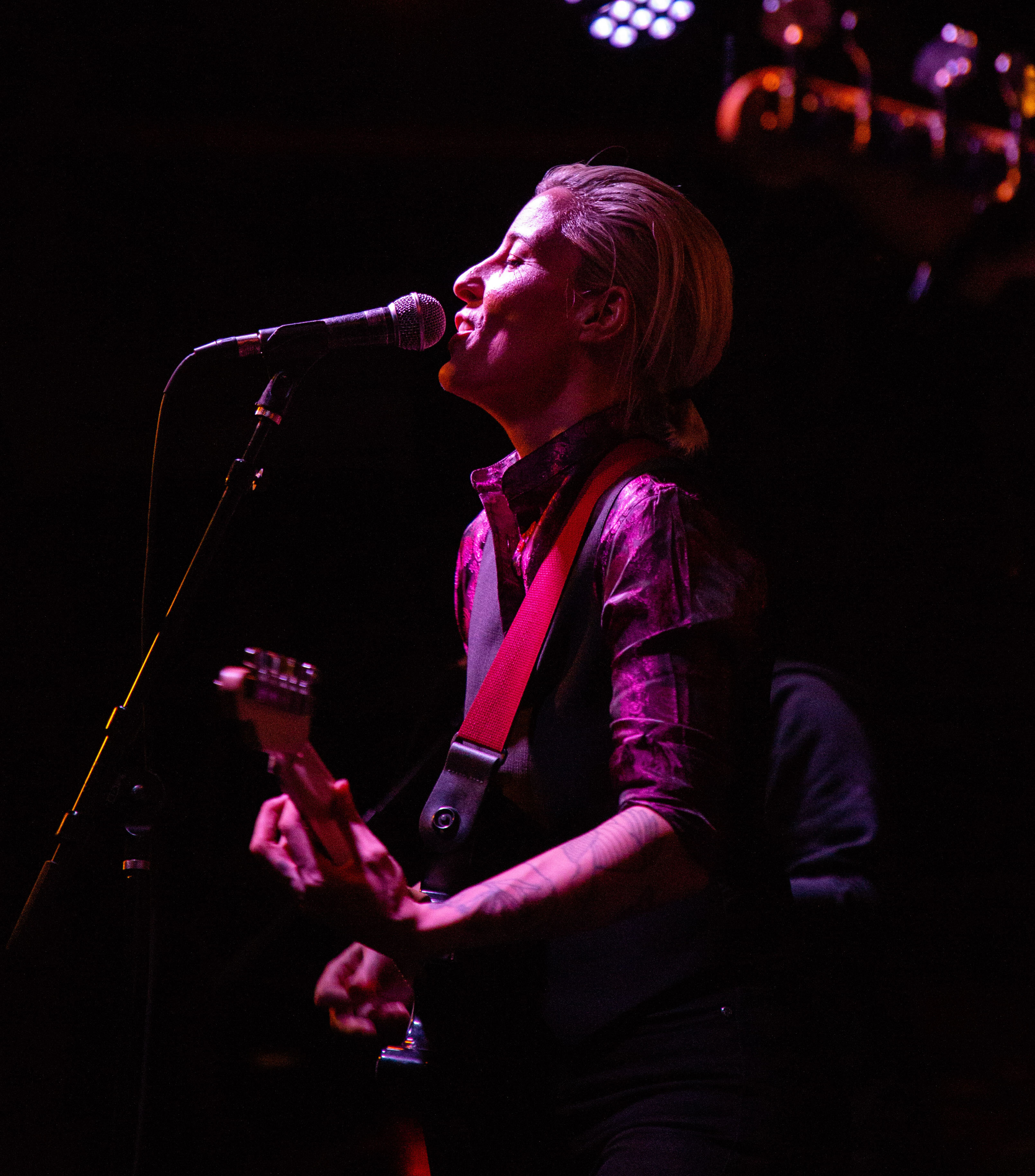

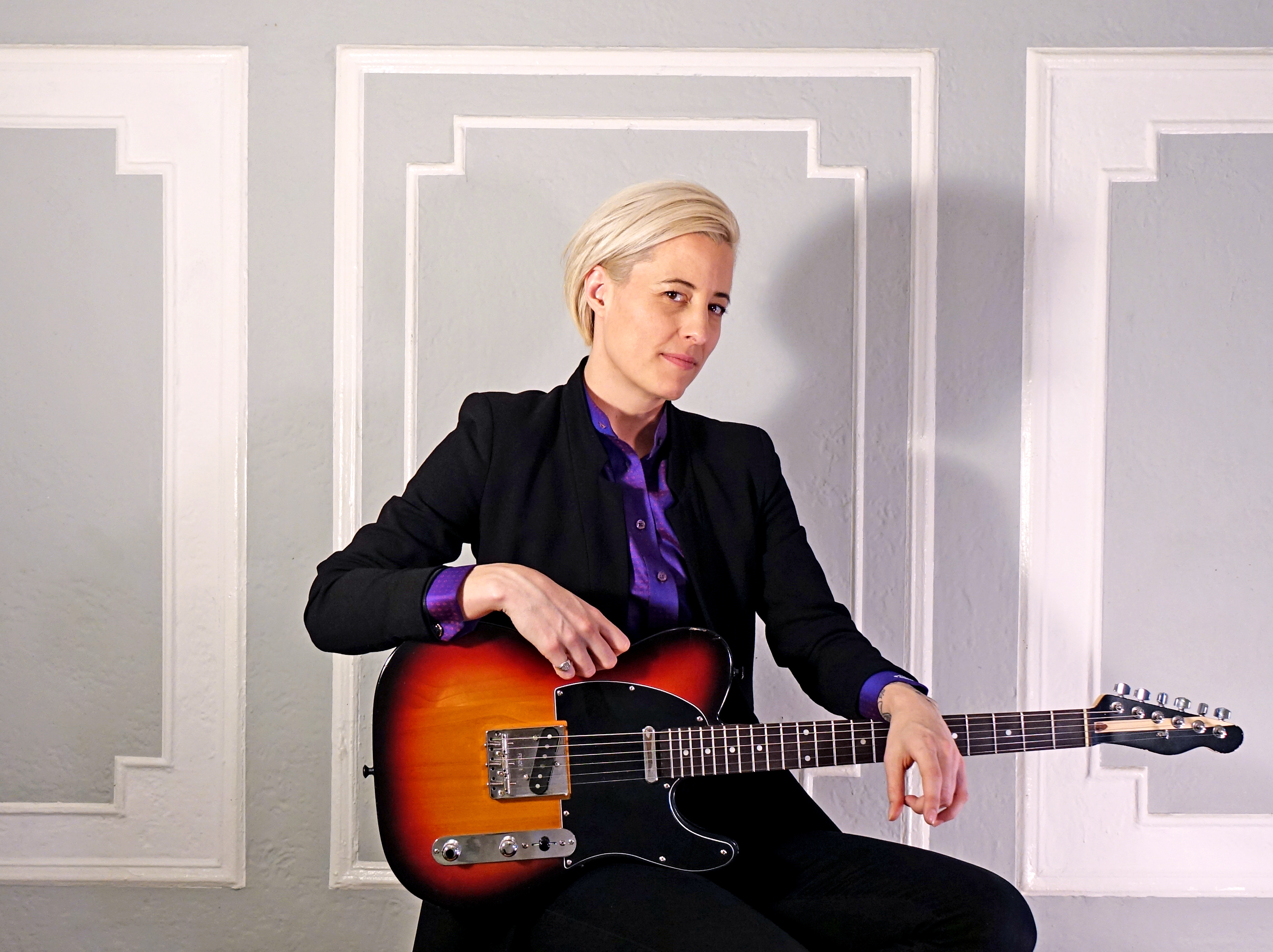

Jess McAvoy is a Brooklyn-based performing artist, songwriter, musician and voice coach who was born in Perth, Western Australia. Their career spans over three decades and twenty independent studio recordings. McAvoy has toured extensively across Australia, Europe, Canada and the United States. They currently reside in Brooklyn, New York.

== Biography ==
Jess McAvoy was born on 11 January 1980 in South Perth and started playing the guitar and writing music at the age of eleven. When McAvoy was only 14, they created their own record label, Henduwin Music. At sixteen, McAvoy performed in Western Australia for the first time in "Battle of the Bands" at the now defunct Fly by Night Club in Fremantle, where they won first prize. In 1999, McAvoy began playing the Melbourne pub circuit. As their career gained momentum, they became a staple on National Australian Radio and made appearances on Australian television.

In 2006, McAvoy released Into the Dark, which was declared Album of the Week by Beat Magazine's Nick Snelling. He wrote, "This is truly a beautiful release. Into the Dark not only crystallizes the gorgeous melancholy of her songwriting, but finally does justice to that wonderful frayed beauty in her voice, that husk versus honey, and the raw introspection of her lyrics. An album to treasure". The album received high accolades from The Age's Clem Bastow, who described McAvoy as "one of the best rootsy female singer-songwriters" and the album as "a stunning spectrum of songs and emotions ... [which] explores the many facets of love and life, and most listeners will find more than a few songs resonating personally".

In 2008, McAvoy's follow up album, As the Sun Falls, also earned rave reviews. Kaz Mitchell from Inpress Magazine (Melbourne) and Drum Media (Sydney) described it as "Her best album to date. Thumbs up to a very cool album filled with plenty of verve". As the Sun Falls features their most popular single, The Sailor.

In 2011, McAvoy decided to relocate to North America. During their "farewell show" at the Corner Hotel in Melbourne, several fellow Australian performers surprised the audience by interpreting their favorite McAvoy songs. Liz Stringer and Dallas Frasca made cameo appearances. McAvoy also performed a special duet version of The Sailor with Wally de Backer (Gotye).

Currently based in Brooklyn, New York, McAvoy continues to write and collaborate with other artists. In addition they are a voice coach and host of The Sing Easy™, a collective voice practice for all bodies.

In 2023 Jess staged their one person rock musical “The Search” at The Tank theater in Manhattan. It was followed by performances at the Butterfly Club in Melbourne for Midsumma Festival in January 2024 and at 3 Dollar Bill in Brooklyn later that year.

Reviews of The Search include 5 stars from Artshub in Melbourne

"The Search by Jess McAvoy is, simply put, a class act – a 60-minute tour de force that will remain with you for some time"

- Artshub Australia

== Personal life ==
McAvoy has Dutch heritage and speaks fluent Dutch.

McAvoy has cited many of their musical influences as Tori Amos, Billy Joel, Radiohead, Rage Against the Machine, Jeff Buckley, Nina Simone and Karnivool.

McAvoy came out as non-binary in 2019.

== Discography ==
=== Albums (all released on Henduwin Music) ===
- Deepest Feelings (cassette, EP 1994)
- Watershed (EP, 1997)
- Release (EP, 1999)
- Four Short Stories (EP, 2001)
- Light Wait (2002)
- En Masse (2004)
- Into the Dark (2006)
- As the Sun Falls (2008)
- Favorite Time of Day (2009)
- Favorite Time of Day (Live at the Wick) DVD release (2010)
- 14 North (EP, 2010)
- Somewhere (with Liz Stringer) (EP, 2011)
- The Women (2014)
- Curious (Single, 2018)
- Courage (Single, 2018)
- All Alone (Single, 2018)
- Do What You Want (Single, 2019)
- Everything Must Change (Single, 2020)
- Things I Never Told You (EP, 2020)
- American Dreaming (LP, 2024)

== Awards ==
- McAvoy was nominated at the West Australian Music Industry Awards, including the 1999 track "Girl", which was compiled on the related album, Kiss My WAMi '99.
- Beat Magazine's Album of the Week for Into the Dark
- Australian Council grant recipient
- Short listed for the APRA Professional Development Award
