= Goldroom =

American songwriter

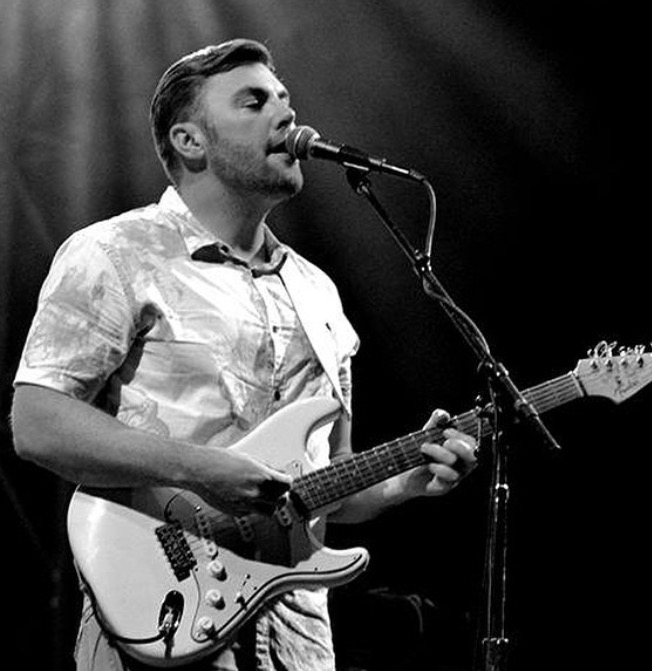
- Goldroom in 2015

Background information
- Born: Josh Legg; 1983 or 1984 (age 41–42)
- Origin: Boston, Massachusetts, United States
- Genres: Nu-disco; deep house; electropop; tropical house
- Occupations: Producer; songwriter; singer; musician
- Years active: 2007–present
- Labels: Binary; Downtown
- Formerly of: NightWaves
- Website: goldroom.la

Josh Legg, known professionally as Goldroom, is an American electronic musician.

== Early life and education ==
Legg grew up in Wellesley, Massachusetts. Legg studied psychology at the University of Southern California in Los Angeles and graduated in 2010.

== Career ==
Legg and classmate Kyle Peterson formed the synthpop band NightWaves and co-founded the record label Binary Entertainment, although the former went on hiatus in 2011. Since being established in 2007, Binary has worked with artists including Anoraak, Bag Raiders, College, Futurecop!, Miami Horror, and The Twelves.

Legg began producing music under the name Goldroom in 2011, with remixes of tracks including Niki and the Dove's "Mother Protect". He took his stage name from the name of a bar in the Echo Park area of LA. He released his debut EP, Angeles, the same year, followed by the EP Embrace in 2013. Although Goldroom had performed vocals on all Angeles tracks (he also sang harmonies and backing vocals in NightWaves), for Embrace he enlisted vocalists including Chela, Ariela Jacobs, Mereki, and Say Lou Lou.

In 2014, Goldroom released the single "Till Sunrise", the music video for which was directed by actress Dianna Agron. In 2015, he issued the EP It's Like You Never Went Away via Downtown Records. Accompanying the EP, music videos for each of the tracks were premiered via the video messaging application Snapchat. It's Like You Never Went Away includes a newly recorded version of "Embrace" featuring the song's co-writer, George Maple.

Goldroom's musical influences include Alan Braxe, Daft Punk, Bob Dylan, Fred Falke, Al Green, LCD Soundsystem, Nirvana, and Tom Petty. He describes his output as "modern dance music production incorporating live instrumentation" and "dance music for the backyard, dance music for the beach".

== Discography ==
=== Studio albums ===
- West of the West (2016)
- Plunge /\ Surface (2019)

=== Extended plays ===
- Angeles (2011)
- Embrace (2013)
- It's Like You Never Went Away (2015)

=== Singles ===
- "Fifteen" (2012)
- "Sweetness Alive" (2012)
- "Only You Can Show Me" (2013)
- "Embrace" (2014)
- "Till Sunrise" (2014)
- "Waiting to Ignite" (2015)
- "Silhouette" (2016)
- "Lying to You" (2016)
- "Retrograde" (2016)

=== Remixes ===
- Penguin Prison – "Fair Warning" (2011)
- Poolside – "Do You Believe" (2011)
- Niki and the Dove – "Mother Protect" (2011)
- Lancelot – "We Can Dance" (2012)
- Alpine – "Hands" (2012)
- St. Lucia – "All Eyes on You" (2012)
- MS MR – "Hurricane" (2012)
- Atlas Genius – "Back Seat" (2013)
- Charli XCX – "You (Ha Ha Ha)" (2013)
- The Knocks – "Modern Hearts" (2013)
- Owl Eyes – "Jewels & Sapphires" (2013)
- MØ – "Don't Wanna Dance" (2014)
- Architecture in Helsinki – "I Might Survive" (2014)
- EKKAH – "Last Chance To Dance" (2015)
- Chvrches – "Leave a Trace" (2015)
- Janet Jackson – "No Sleeep" (2016)
