= Bridezilla (EP) =

EP by Bridezilla
- Released: 24 November 2007
- Recorded: 2007
- Genre: Indie rock
- Length: 20:56
- Label: Ivy League Records

Bridezilla EP is the first official release by the Australian indie band Bridezilla. It was released on 24 November 2007

== Track listing ==
1. "Brown Paper Bag" - (3:06)
2. "Chainwork" - (4:51)
3. "Saint Francine" - (4:31)
4. "Mr. Young" - (4:35)
5. "Forbidden Holiday" - (3:56)

== Reception ==
The album received mixed reviews getting a score of 3.5/5 at Sputnik Music. Alex Silveri said it was "A beautiful sprawling mix of great alternative rock that drips with potential."
