= Paris Wells =

Australian singer-songwriter

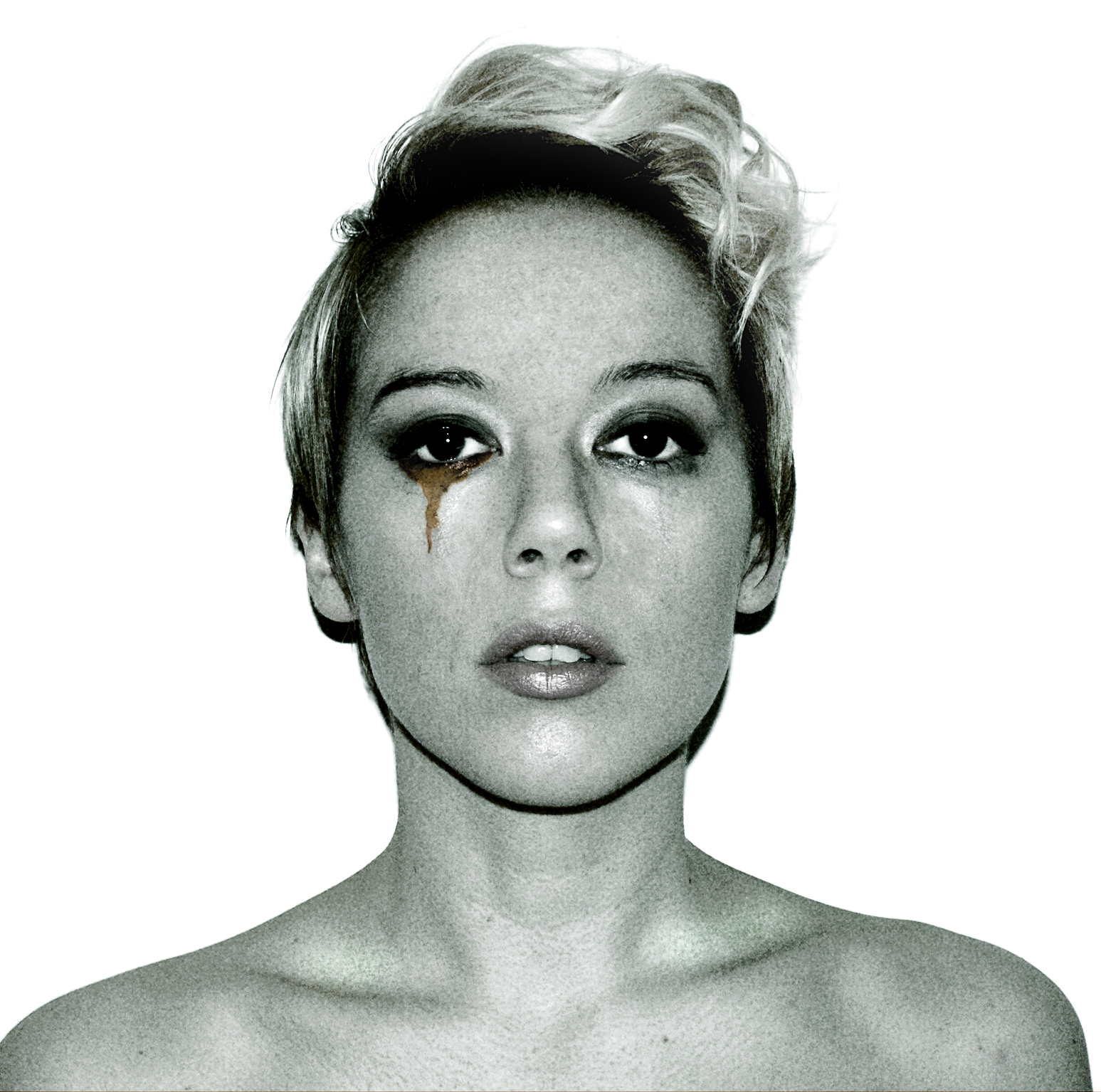
- Wells in 2010

Background information
- Genre: Indie pop
- Occupations: Musician, songwriter, topliner
- Instrument: Vocals,
- Years active: 2004–present
- Label: Xelon
- Website: http://pariswellsmusic.com/

Paris Wells is an Australian singer-songwriter based in Melbourne. She has released two albums and one EP. Wells has played at festivals such as Falls Festival, Big Day Out, Meredith and Sydney Music Festival. She has supported Justin Timberlake, Rod Stewart, Plan B, Robyn and Jamie Lidell on tour.

== Biography ==
Wells was a Fairfax employee working in the advertising sales department, when she started performing tiny underground gigs with DJ friends in Melbourne.

Her early gigs at local bars consisted mostly "toasting" over funk breaks, but after forming a creative partnership with Ryan Ritchie (aka RHyNO), a songwriter and artist with group True Live, she released her debut EP of her own material, Mum Hasn't Slept Yet, with label Illusive Sounds. Wells was then offered slots on the festival circuit, playing the Meredith Music Festival, Falls Festival and the Sydney festivals.

Wells released her first album, entitled Keep It, in July 2008.

Wells' song "Grace Baby" was picked up for a Myer's television advertising campaign. The singer was awarded the $10,000 Jessica Michalik Contemporary Music Endowment, an annual grant given to promising acts by the producers of the Big Day Out.

On 14 March 2009, she appeared with Bliss n Eso at the Sound Relief concert at the MCG, performing "Field of Dreams". Following a successful audition, Wells supported Justin Timberlake during his FutureSex/Loveshow tour of Australia and New Zealand.

Wells was also the voice of Tourism Victoria.

In October 2010, Wells released her second album, Various Small Fires. She was chosen to sing the St. Kilda Saints AFL Football Club's theme in the 2010 AFL Grand Final. Two songs have been released off the Various Small Fires album: "Through And Through" and "Lets Get It Started". Wells has appeared on TV programs such as Spicks and Specks, Rockwiz, Adam Hills in Gordon Street Tonight, Talkin' 'Bout Your Generation and Good News Week.

In 2013, she appeared on Australian Channel Seven's soap drama Home and Away.

Wells moved to London on the advice of Raye Cosbert (Amy Winehouse's manager) who told her to do more Topline work along with her solo projects. Wells began a writing hub with celebrity DJ Kaz James and Belgium punk and pop producer/composer Nico Renson.

In 2014 Wells met Danish fashion designer Christian Back and moved to Copenhagen where she was signed with Sony Denmark for her single "Overbite". "Overbite" was used by Elie SaaB for their Cannes Film Festival campaign.

Wells is now working on her next release along with toplining for others in 2018. She is also in training to be a celebrant.

== Discography ==
=== Albums ===
List of albums, with selected details and chart positions
Title	Album details	Peak chart positions
Title	Album details	AUS
Keep It	Released: July 2008; Format: CD; Label: Illusive Sounds (ILL017CD)	—
Various Small Fires	Released: October 2010; Format: CD; Label: Illusive Sounds (ILL035CD)	61

=== Extended plays ===
List of EPs, with selected details
Title	Details
Mum Hasn't Slept Yet	Released: September 2007; Format: CD

=== Singles ===
List of singles
Title	Year
"Dat Du Dat"	2008
"Lonely"	2008
"Through and Through"	2010
"Overbite"	2015
"Two Step Romance"	2017
"Nerve" (with Watermelon Boy)	2017

=== Guest appearances ===
List of guest appearances, with other performing artists, showing year released and album name
Title	Year	Other artist(s)	Album
"Field of Dreams"	2008	Bliss n Eso	Flying Colours
"Success"	2012	Chance Waters	Infinity
