= Chela (singer) =

Filipino-Australian singer and songwriter

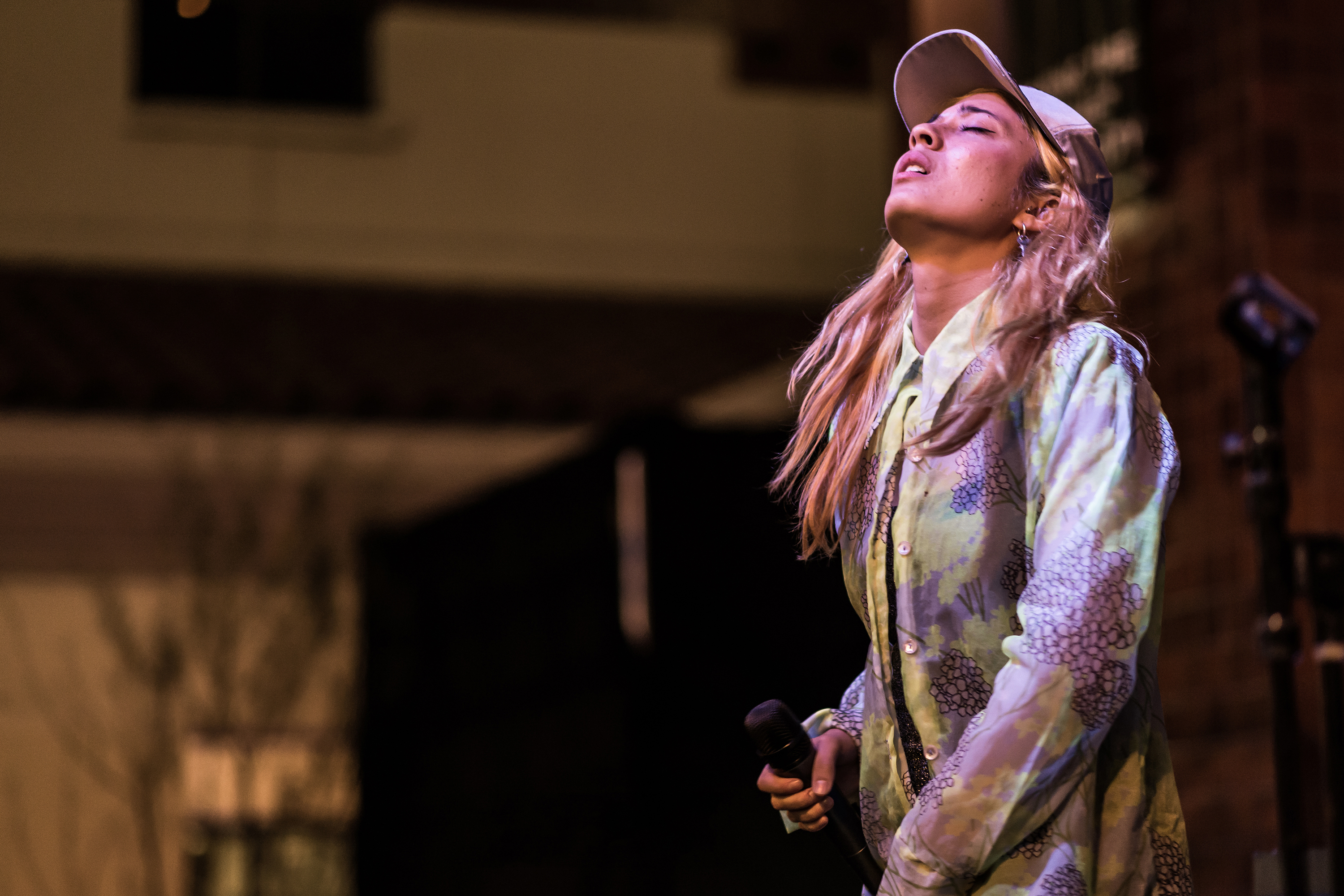

Background information
- Also known as: Chela
- Born: Chelsea Wheatley; Fremantle, Western Australia, Australia
- Genres: Electropop, alternative
- Occupations: Singer, musician, songwriter, record producer
- Instruments: Vocals, bass guitar, keyboard
- Years active: 2014–present
- Labels: Kitsuné 2014-2017; Independent 2017-present
- Formerly of: The Gingers
- Website: https://www.chelaetc.com/

Chela (born Chelsea Wheatley) is a Filipino-Australian singer and songwriter who has released a number of singles.

== Biography ==
Originally from Fremantle, Western Australia, she relocated to Melbourne, Victoria with her family at the age of 15, and currently resides in Los Angeles.

Chela began producing music at age 12 on Logic software, and played bass guitar in punk bands throughout her teenage years. She directs her own music videos, and writes and produces most of her own songs, as well as writes for other artists. In 2014 she teamed up with Styalz Fuego to write "Closure" for Owl Eyes, the first single off her debut album "Nightswim", which reached No. 28 in the Australian Albums Chart.

In 2015 Chela was formally recognised by Spotify via their Spotlight Artists. Pulse Radio listed her as one of ten electronic crossover acts "to watch out for" in 2015, and Bit Candy described her as recording "seriously catchy, stand-out music that sets her apart from the sea of electro-pop acts that have been popping up this year".

Chela first gained international attention releasing singles "Romanticise" (featured in the trailer to Sleeping With Other People) and "Zero" on French taste-maker label Kitsuné. It was followed by the single "Plastic Gun". She has also collaborated with several music groups, including Goldroom on his summer-anthem "Fifteen", Clubfeet on their highly-rotated single "Heartbreak", and queer pop-punk cult hero Seth Bogart on his debut self-titled solo album alongside Kathleen Hanna and Tavi Gevinson.

On September 14, 2017, Chela returned with a new single "Bad Habit" by premiering the self-directed video on NPR.

Chela collaborated with Gus Dapperton on the track "My Say So" from his 2020 album Orca. The only song on Dapperton's Orca which features another artist, Chela performs solos during the bridge and "guides the background vocals."
