= Mr Floppy =

Australian alternative/punk rock and oi! band

- Origin: Melbourne, Victoria, Australia
- Genres: Alternative rock, punk rock, oi!
- Years active: 1989–1994
- Labels: Waterfront, Zombie Penis Death
- Past members: Tim Aylward; Mick Kuarol; Bernard Blake; Paul Johnson; Joseph Kennedy

Mr Floppy were an Australian alternative rock, punk rock and oi! band formed in 1989 by Tim Aylward on guitar (ex-The Swarm), Mick Kuarol on guitar, Paul Johnson on bass guitar and vocals and Joseph Kennedy (ex-Pray TV) on drums. They issued three studio albums on Zombie Penis Death Records, which were distributed by Waterfront Records, Breakfast (1991), Gratuitous (1992) and The Unbearable Lightness of Being a Dickhead (1993). They enjoyed a cult following; however, the band broke up in 1994. They were compared to TISM throughout their career, with some people actually claiming Mr Floppy were a TISM side project, although the band members hated such comparisons.

== History ==
Mr Floppy were formed in Ascot Vale, a suburb of Melbourne, in 1989 by Tim Aylward on guitar (ex-The Swarm); Mick Kuarroll on guitar; Paul Johnson on bass guitar and lead vocals and Joseph Kennedy (ex-Pray TV) on drums. The band's name comes from the fourth and final series of the BBC sitcom Blackadder, Blackadder Goes Forth, "Mr Floppy" being one of the Trinity College Tiddlywinkers mentioned by Lt George. They set up their own label, Zombie Penis Death, which was distributed by Waterfront Records. Sometime before the release of their first single, Kennedy left the band and was replaced with a drum machine, dubbed "Bonecrusher Roland" by the band.

Their debut single, "100,000 Morrisseys", appeared in late 1989, which was written by Aylward and Johnson. The lyrics deal with English rock group The Smiths' frontman, Morrissey. The single received many negative reviews but was played on John Peel's radio show. It uses a sample of the beginning of "This Charming Man" and samples other Smiths' songs (including "William, It Was Really Nothing" and "Accept Yourself") throughout the track. It was seen by Jason Heller of The A.V. Club as an anti-Morrissey song where the lyrics ask listeners to "imagine a nightmarish apocalypse where the fearful question on humanity's lips is 'What shall we do? / What shall we do? / When 100,000 Morrisseys come marching over the hill?'". In mid-1990, they signed to Waterfront, who reissued "100,000 Morrisseys".

Late in 1990, they issued a six-track extended play, Firm and Fruity, which had been recorded in that October at Whirled Records Studios. For a Firm and Fruity track, "Stir Fry Baby", Australian blues musician, Chris Wilson, guested on harmonica. Nick Radford of Tharunka felt, "[they] have come up with a few more funny, irreverent tasty ones... [it's] not bad value. The sort of thing you play before going out on a stupid, drunken night on the town."

Kuarrol left the band at the end of 1990 and was replaced by Bernard Blake. On 16 December 1991, Mr Floppy released their debut studio album, Breakfast, which included three cover versions of Australian Crawl's 1983 single, "Reckless" written by James Reyne, parodied as "Breakfast". Also included was the entire contents of Firm and Fruity. "Breakfast" peaked at No. 5 on the 2XX Independent Chart in March 1992.

In early 1992, Blake quit the band, who decided to continue as a two-piece. Later in 1992, Mr Floppy issued a seven-track album, Gratuitous. In April, that year the group supported a gig by pub rockers, v. Spy v. Spy and Canadian folk-rockers, Crash Test Dummies. This turned out to be their last release on Waterfront – they left the label shortly after and got a distribution deal with Mushroom Distribution Services. The band also headlined a show at the Lansdowne in Sydney on 29 April, from which three songs would be included on their next album.

In July 1993, the band released their third and final album, The Unbearable Lightness of Being a Dickhead, which included two cover versions of Kate Bush's "Wuthering Heights". The track "Boring Fart" from this album was used by Silverchair to open up their first tours in the mid-1990s.

The band split up in 1994. Some of their final performances took place between 4 and 7 March of that year at Club O in Perth. Johnson formed a new band called Poontang* that year, reusing the old Mr Floppy PO Box. They played 24 concerts and released one album in October 1998 before disbanding. Aylward currently performs in the band Snake Powder.

In November 2008, The Dwarf website's Matt James reviewed an EP by Melbourne band Root!, Get Up Yourself (August 2008), and noted the influence of Mr Floppy on TISM and Root!: "[w]hatever this kind of music is – I'm gonna go with pop-schlock for now–is very much the wry Melbourne type that seems to have evolved from the oval ball park of Mr Floppy (punk rock), to TISM (dance punk), through to the 5-piece of Root! (roots punk?)".

Most of the songs pre-1992 were written by Aylward and Johnson. The album The Unbearable Lightness of Being a Dickhead credits all songs to Johnson except "Get a Dog Up Ya", written by Aylward and Johnson, and "Birdie Num Num", written by Johnson and Blake. "Birdie Num Num" is first known to have been performed in late 1991 in Sydney.

== Discography ==
- Breakfast (1991)
- Gratuitous (1992)
- The Unbearable Lightness of Being a Dickhead (1993)

== Members ==
- Paul Johnson – lead vocals, bass guitar (1989–1994)
- Tim Aylward – lead guitar, backing vocals (1989–1994)
- Mick Kuarol – rhythm guitar (1989–1990)
- Bernard Blake – rhythm guitar (1990–1992)
- Joseph Kennedy – drums (1989)
