= RocKwiz =

Australian television music show

- Genre: Quiz show
- Created by: Brian Nankervis; Peter Bain-Hogg; Ken Connor
- Written by: Brian Nankervis; Michael Ward
- Directed by: Paul Drane
- Presented by: Julia Zemiro; Brian Nankervis
- Starring: Peter Luscombe; James Black; Mark Ferrie; Ashley Naylor; Clio Renner; Dugald McAndrew
- Theme music composer: The RocKwiz Orkestra
- Country of origin: Australia
- Original language: English
- No. of seasons: 15
- No. of episodes: 185 (list of episodes)

Production
- Executive producers: Joe Connor; Ken Connor; Peter Bain-Hogg
- Production locations: St Kilda, Victoria, Australia
- Editors: Chris Ward; Samuel Frederick
- Running time: 60–90 minutes
- Production company: Renegade Films

Original release
- Network: SBS
- Release: 31 January 2005 – 25 June 2016
- Network: Fox8
- Release: 24 February – 14 April 2023

RocKwiz is an Australian television live music trivia quiz show, focused on rock music and featuring different guest artist musicians who perform live in each episode. The show was co-created by Brian Nankervis, Peter Bain-Hogg, and Ken Connor. It was originally broadcast on SBS and premiered in 2005. The 14th season was the final season produced by SBS, with the final episode airing on 25 June 2016. In October 2022, it was announced that a new series would be commissioned by Foxtel. and will air on Fox8 in 2023 with eight 30-minute episodes, with some changes to the format due to the shorter episodes and filming in a studio.

The series won the 2007 AFI Award for Best Light Entertainment Television Series and was nominated in the same category three times. It was also nominated for a Helpmann Award

== Summary ==
The program is hosted by Julia Zemiro and originally aired on Saturdays at 8:30 pm, except in 2014 when it aired on Mondays at 9:30 pm. Regular episodes are shot in The Gershwin Room at St Kilda's Esplanade Hotel, commonly called just The Espy, in Melbourne. The program format typically puts local lesser-known singers alongside more well known Australian and international musicians in a show closing duet after they have led teams of contestants chosen from the audience in a trivia quiz. It has a cult following for its no-frills style. The show features the "RocKwiz Orkestra" which provides musical clues and backing for the special music guests and, where needed, the contestants.

RocKwiz began taking the show on tour in 2009, adapting the show into a successful touring franchise and has staged national tours and special appearances at festivals. During and since television production ended, RocKwiz continues to undertake multi city shows around the country every year.

== Cast ==
=== Hosts ===
The show is hosted by Julia Zemiro with Brian Nankervis as the scorer and "adjudicator where necessary". Dugald McAndrew is the roadie who features as a "human scoreboard". The show had the following guest hosts while Zemiro was away on Eurovision duties:

- Tex Perkins (10 January 2009 and 27 February 2010)
- David McCormack (17 January 2009)

=== House Band ===
The RocKwiz Orkestra comprises:

- Peter "Lucky" Luscombe – drums, lead vocals
- "Jumping" James Black (2005–2014) (see The Black Sorrows, Mondo Rock) – guitar, Hammond organ, vocals
- Mark Ferrie (former member of Sacred Cowboys and Models) – bass guitar
- Ashley Naylor (2015–2016) – guitars, vocals
- Clio Renner (2015–2016, 2023) – keyboards, vocals
- Bill McDonald (2023) – bass guitar
- Olympia (2023-2024) – lead guitar and vocals
- The Wolfgramm Sisters originally provided backing vocals, including many Christmas Specials, Comedy Festivals and RocKwiz Salute the Bowl performances.
- Vika and Linda Bull frequently provide backing vocals for the guest.

== Rounds ==
The quiz comprises five rounds, and one preliminary round called "Ready Steady RocKwiz" which happens off air to select the contestants for the show from the live audience at the venue on the night. A notable feature of the show is its very casual attitude to the scoring system – a fact Brian once addressed on his introductory segment after apparently receiving some complaints from viewers. A common example of this is the awarding of "bonus points", often done when one team appears to be dominant.

- Ready Steady RocKwiz – Early series of RocKwiz often opened with this pre-recorded segment, however more recently this is all done off air. Brian Nankervis runs three or four rounds of questions to find four finalists from 24 players to make up the two teams later for the TV episode recording. After the footage has been shown and the guests introduced, Zemiro will usually ask the four guests what the first album they ever bought was, and/or what the first concert they ever went to was. The title of this segment is an allusion to the 1960s British pop music TV show Ready Steady Go! and theme music of this segment comes from the 1978 song "Know your Product" by Australian group The Saints.
- Who Can it Be Now? – This round introduces the show's two musical guests for the evening. Clues are read out in a "Who Am I?" style, and a team buzzes in when they know the answer. Ten points are awarded, and then the guest arrives and performs a song. The first guest announced will join the team that correctly guessed them, then the next guest joins the other team (after also performing a song), although the first team can still answer the question. Zemiro usually asks the guests about their first concert and/or album bought as well. The title and theme music of this segment comes from the 1981 song "Who Can It Be Now?" by Australian group Men at Work.

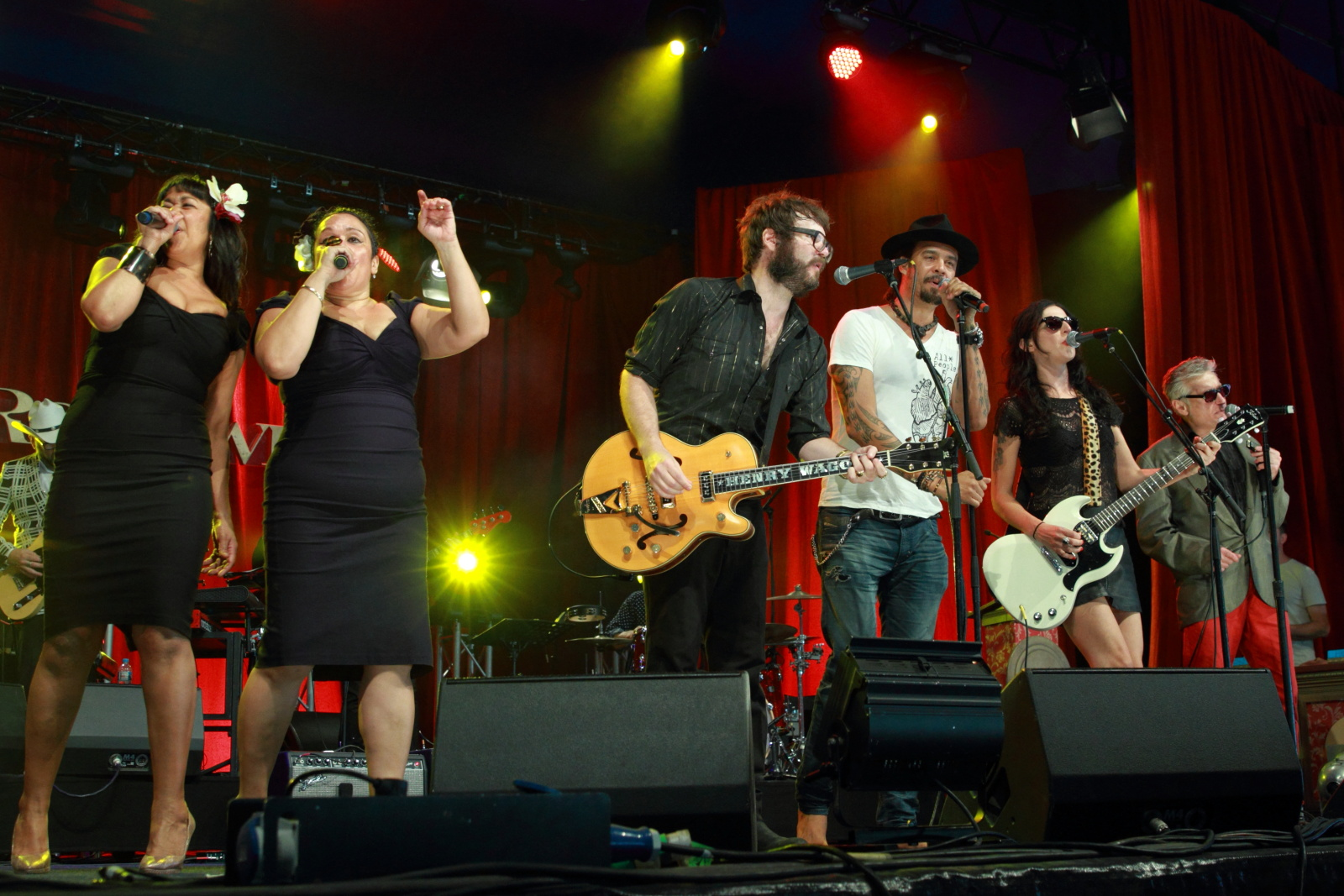
Finale of Rockwiz Live at Byron Bay Bluesfest, April 2014. L to R - Linda Bull, Vika Bull, Henry Wagons, Michael Franti, Adalita Srsen, Robert Susz.

- Local and/or General – As the title suggests, this is a general knowledge music quiz section. The title of this segment comes from the album title and song by Australian group Models on their 1981 album of the same name.
- Million Dollar Riff – The RocKwiz Orkestra plays a series of notable riffs and a team buzzes in when they recognise the riff. The riff played as the intro in the first 12 series is from AC/DC's "Back In Black". More recently the intro music reflects the title of this segment which comes from the 1975 song by Australian group Skyhooks.
- Master Blaster – The musical guests are given a number of questions, usually around five, to answer, on a specialist subject they have nominated. The title and theme music of this segment comes from the 1980 song "Master Blaster (Jammin')" by Stevie Wonder.
- Whole Lotta Facts - This segment replaced Master Blaster in series 11. The musical guests essentially pick a topic and talk (or sometimes sing) on that topic. The riff played as the intro is from "Whole Lotta Love" by Led Zeppelin, which also inspired the segment name. This segment did not reappear in series 12.
- Thirty Three and a Third - A new segment for series 11. Each team has 33 and one third seconds to answer as many questions as they can. The title of the segment comes from the number of revolutions per minute of a vinyl album. There is no intro riff. While it supposedly shares its name with the 1976 George Harrison album "Thirty Three & 1/3", there is no evidence to suggest it was named after this record.
- The Middle Eight - Another new segment introduced in series 11. Eight questions with the last three questions having the same answer, a performer's name, and that artist will make a surprise appearance to perform a song.
- Furious Five – This round involves "five or so" minutes of fast and furious questions to both teams. Usually, the Furious Five does not quite reach the five-minute mark. The title of this segment comes from the American group Grandmaster Flash and the Furious Five and the theme music is composed of five 'furious' notes.

To close each show the musical guests perform a duet accompanied by the RocKwiz Orkestra. Four volumes of the best duets have been released on CD & DVD and some of the duets are available on iTunes.

== Episodes ==
As of June 2016, fourteen seasons of the show had been broadcast on SBS. In addition to the regular episodes, there have been a number of specials and Christmas shows. Episode running times for series one and two was 26 minutes. Series three to ten had a regular running time of 44 minutes. Season 11-14 episodes have a regular running time of 52 minutes. The 15th season airing on Foxtel in 2023 has a running time of 30 minutes.

== Tours ==
Since 2009, RocKwiz began touring around Australia adapting the episodic format into a successful touring format and subsequent franchise. In addition to national tours, RocKwiz continues to join festivals and perform once-off shows around the country. Notably in 2026, RocKwiz returned to the Espy for 4 shows in May, the first time since SBS ended production in 2016

- RocKwiz National Tour - 2010
- RocKwiz Some Kind of Genius Tour - 2012
- RocKwiz Salute Vanda And Young - 2013
- RocKwiz Live! Salutes the ARIA Hall of Fame - 2015
- RocKwiz Really Really Good Friday - Yearly since 2016 at Hamer Hall
- The RocKwiz Live! Christmas(ish) Show - 2016
- RocKwiz Live! 'TWENTYSEVENTEEN'
- RocKwiz Revue - 2018
- RocKwiz Live! Back on the Road - 2022
- RocKwiz Salutes Mushroom 50 - 2023
- Never Mind the Buzzers, Here's RocKwiz Live! - 2024
- RocKwiz Live in '25

== Discography ==
=== Albums ===
List of albums + music video releases, with Australian chart positions
Title	Album details	Peak chart positions		Certifications
Title	Album details	AUS	AUS DVD	Certifications
RocKwiz Duets / Two for the Show	Released: August 2006; Format: CD / DVD; Label: SBS/Liberation (LIBCD8211.2/LIBDVD1064)	86	14	ARIA: Gold (DVD)
RockWiz Duets Volume 2	Released: October 2007; Format: CD / DVD; Label: SBS/Liberation (LIBCD9245.2/LIBDVD1079)	-	29	
RockWiz Christmas	Released: 2008; Format: CD; Label: Liberation (LMCD0030)	-	—N/a	
The RocKwiz Duets Volume III: The Beat Goes On	Released: October 2009; Format: CD / 2×DVD; Label: SBS/Liberation (LMCD0091/LIBDVD1079)	-	23	
RockWiz Uncovered	Released: 2010; Format: 4×CD; Label: Universal Music Australia (5326069)	-	—N/a	
National Tour	Released: October 2010; Format: CD + DVD; Label: Liberation (LIBDVD1110)	-	6	
RockWiz The Christmas Album	Released: 2011; Format: CD, LP; Label: Universal Music Australia (LMCD0153)	-	—N/a	
RockWiz Uncovered Volume Two	Released: 2012; Format: 2×CD; Label: Universal Music Australia (5339127)	-	—N/a	
RocKwiz - Sunday Morning	Released: September 2015; Format: CD, LP; Label: RocKwiz (ROC009b); Note: Compilation	-	—N/a	
RocKwiz, Vol.1 (Live)	Released: October 2024; Format: LP, Digital; Label: Renegade Films (RW044); Note: Compilation	-	—N/a	

== DVD releases ==
- RocKwiz Salutes The Bowl was released on DVD in Australia on 21 August 2009
- RocKwiz Duets volume 1-3 DVDs were collected into a box set released on DVD in Australia on 28 May 2010
- Series 1 was released on DVD in Australia on 5 October 2011
- Series 2 was released on DVD in Australia on 5 October 2011
- Series 3 was released on DVD in Australia on 30 November 2011
- Series 4 was released on DVD in Australia on 6 June 2012

== Awards and nominations ==
=== ARIA Music Awards ===
The ARIA Music Awards is an annual awards ceremony that recognises excellence, innovation, and achievement across all genres of Australian music. They commenced in 1987.

Year	Nominee / work	Award	Result	Ref.
2009	RocKwiz Salutes the Bowl	Best Music DVD	Nominated	
2011	Live National Tour	Best Music DVD	Nominated	
2012	The RocKwiz Christmas Album	Best Original Soundtrack, Cast or Show Album	Nominated	

== See also ==
- Spicks and Specks, a similar ABC music quiz show.
