= Reclink Australia =

Australian health and recreation charity

- Formation: 1990
- Founder: Peter Cullen
- Type: Non-profit organisation
- Location: Australia
- Website: reclink.org

Reclink Australia is an Australian non-profit organisation that provides sport, recreation and arts programs for people experiencing disadvantage. Established in Victoria in 1990 by Peter Cullen, the organisation developed from sporting programs for people experiencing homelessness and unemployment in Melbourne and later expanded its activities throughout Australia.

Reclink also benefits from the Reclink Community Cup, an annual charity Australian rules football event combining football and live music. The event began in Melbourne in 1993 and has since expanded to several Australian cities.

== History ==
=== Origins ===
Reclink Australia was established in Victoria in 1990. Its founder, Peter Cullen, had worked with people experiencing homelessness and disadvantage through the Sacred Heart Mission in St Kilda. Cullen worked as an outreach worker before becoming the mission's sport and recreation coordinator.

Reclink's early development was closely associated with Australian rules football. In a 2000 interview with ABC Radio National, Cullen said that the Sacred Heart Mission football team had begun in response to the boredom and loneliness he encountered while working with people on the streets of St Kilda. The initial activity consisted of informal kick-to-kick sessions, which developed into social football matches.

Cullen subsequently contacted other community agencies to establish the Recreation Link Football League. By 2000, the league consisted of nine teams and was described by the ABC as a competition for unemployed and homeless people. The competition emphasised participation rather than conventional competitive success, with teams accommodating players who had varying levels of experience and ability.

=== Organisational Development ===
By the 2010s, Reclink had expanded beyond its original Victorian operations. In 2015, the Victorian Government stated that the organisation was providing more than 4,500 sporting and artistic activities nationally.

In 2017, the Australian Government announced $2 million in funding over two years for Reclink's national program. At the time, the federal government reported that Reclink had partnerships with more than 300 community organisations around Australia. The funded program was intended to operate across 25 metropolitan and regional locations and provide opportunities for up to 3,000 participants.

The 2017 federal funding supported both team-based and individual sport and recreation programs. The program also incorporated access to support services and case management for some participants, including assistance for people seeking education or employment.

== Programs ==
Reclink provides sport and recreation activities through partnerships with community organisations. Its programs have been directed towards groups including people experiencing homelessness, unemployment, social isolation, disability, mental illness and drug or alcohol issues.

Programs have varied according to location and community needs. In 2017, the Australian Government cited examples including a 14-team Australian rules football competition in Victoria, a 20-team touch football competition in south-east Queensland and a learn-to-swim program for Afghan refugees in Tasmania.

=== Reclink Australia Victorian Football League ===
The Reclink Australia Victorian Football League developed from the football programs associated with Reclink's early history. The Recreation Link Football League was already operating in Melbourne by 2000, when it consisted of nine teams for people experiencing unemployment or homelessness.

The Victorian league has subsequently been used as a case study of the effects of structured community sport. In 2016, Reclink commissioned the La Trobe University Centre for Sport and Social Impact to investigate the social value of the league.

The study examined the experiences of participants as well as community agencies, volunteers and other organisations involved in the league. It considered outcomes including social connectedness, mental and physical health, skill development, employment, substance use and interactions with the criminal justice system.

Using a social return on investment methodology, the researchers estimated that the league generated at least $8.94 in social value for every $1 in cash, staff time, volunteer time and other resources invested in its operation. SROI incorporates social outcomes in addition to conventional financial returns.

=== Access for All Abilities Play ===
Reclink operates Access for All Abilities Play, commonly known as AAA Play, in Victoria. The program is an information and referral service intended to connect people with disabilities to accessible sport and recreation opportunities.

AAA Play assists participants in locating activities based on factors including their location, disability and preferred sport or recreational activity. The service works with sporting associations, community clubs, local governments and disability sport and recreation providers. The program is supported by the Victorian Government.

== Reclink Community Cup ==
The Reclink Community Cup is an annual charity Australian rules football event that combines a football match with live music. The first Community Cup was held in Melbourne in 1993.

In Melbourne, the principal match traditionally pits the Rockdogs, a team of musicians, against the Megahertz, a team of community radio presenters associated with stations including Triple R and PBS. Live bands also perform during the event.

The Community Cup subsequently expanded outside Melbourne. By 2025, events were scheduled in Sydney, Brisbane, Adelaide, Hobart, Canberra and Perth as well as Melbourne. Different editions of the event have adapted the teams to their local music, media and community organisations.

The event has included performances or participation from a number of Australian musicians, including Paul Kelly, Tim Rogers, Dan Sultan, Courtney Barnett and Archie Roach. Prime Minister Anthony Albanese has also been involved with Community Cup events and fundraisers.

In 2025, Reclink chief executive Dave Wells told The Guardian that Community Cup events generated more than $250,000 each year for Reclink Australia. The funds are used to support the organisation's sport and recreation programs.

== Research and evaluation ==
Reclink's programs have been examined in research concerning the use of sport and recreation among people experiencing disadvantage. One of the organisation's principal evaluations was the 2017 report The social value of a Reclink Australia structured sport program, produced by the Centre for Sport and Social Impact at La Trobe University.

The study focused on the Victorian Reclink Australia Football League and used interviews with participants, Reclink staff, representatives of partner agencies, volunteers and community sporting organisations. Its stated purpose was to identify ways in which participation in the league contributed to the physical, mental and social health of participants, as well as examining benefits to agencies and volunteers.

Researchers reported outcomes associated with increased social connectedness, improvements in participants' reported mental wellbeing, development of interpersonal and employment-related skills, and connections between participants and support services. The researchers also attempted to assign an economic value to these outcomes through the social return on investment calculation, producing the estimate of $8.94 in social value for every $1 of resources invested in the league.

The study noted that Reclink's model involved cooperation between the organisation, community agencies, volunteers, local government and sporting clubs. Resources used by football teams included staff and volunteer time, playing equipment and access to sporting facilities.

== See also ==
- Community Cup
- Sport in Australia
- Homelessness in Australia
