= Rebecca Barnard =

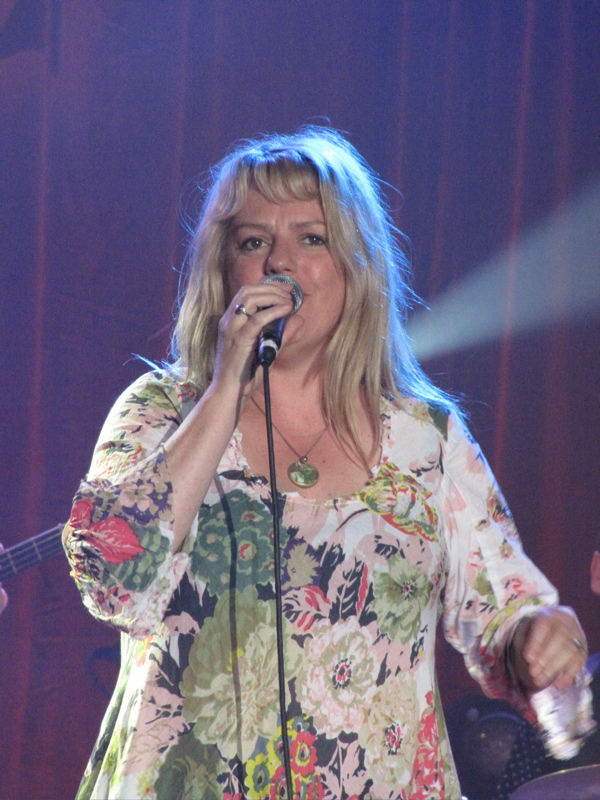
- Barnard performing at the Royal Theatre in Canberra

Background information
- Born: Rebecca Chirnside Barnard; 1960 (age 65–66); Melbourne, Victoria, Australia
- Genres: Pop, rock, jazz
- Occupations: Musician; singer-songwriter; jazz singer; producer; teacher
- Instruments: Vocals, guitar, bass
- Years active: 1982–present
- Formerly of: Rebecca's Empire
- Website: www.rebeccabarnard.com

Rebecca Chirnside Barnard (born 1960) is an Australian singer, songwriter, producer and musician. She was the lead singer of the band Rebecca's Empire from 1993 to 2000 and has forged a solo career since her debut album, Fortified, was released in 2006. Her second solo album, Everlasting, was released in 2010. After a lengthy break of just under seven years, Barnard released her third solo album, Music for Listening and Relaxation, in 2017. She released her first solo jazz album, The Night We Called It A Day, in 2023.

Barnard is a Melbourne-based musician with a versatile musical range, delving into rock, and pop, but is mainly a jazz singer. She has appeared on recordings by many Australian artists, including Paul Kelly, Tim Rogers, Renée Geyer, Deborah Conway, the Meanies, Warped, Stephen Cummings, TISM, You Am I, the Black Sorrows, The Fauves, Kutcha Edwards, The Audreys, and Guy Pearce.

== Early life and education ==
Rebecca Chirnside Barnard was born in Melbourne, Australia, the daughter of Australian jazz drummer Len Barnard (once a member of the jazz band Galapagos Duck) and Jane Chirnside. She grew up in the outer-eastern Melbourne suburb of Mooroolbark in an estate designed by Edna Walling.

Barnard comes from a rich musical family history. In the 1920s her grandparents Jim and Kath Barnard ran the Kath Barnard Jazz Band. In 1952 her father's Len Barnard Jazz Band recorded Australia's first microgroove LP record and toured extensively in Australia and overseas until his death in 2005. Her uncle, Bob Barnard (1933–2022), was an accomplished Australian jazz trumpet and cornet stylist.

During her childhood, she listened to Gladys Moncrieff, Fats Waller, Pinetop Smith, Billie Holiday and Louis Armstrong. She started playing music at 10 when her father gave her a guitar and started writing songs at 12. At 14, she became acquainted with Joni Mitchell and Bob Dylan.

== Career ==
Barnard is inherently a jazz singer and has said "I've always sung jazz, that's sort of like my first love, you know, it's like breathing. It's sort of effortless." Barnard began singing jazz in Melbourne venues when she was 16.

Barnard featured in the Australian bands Daktari (1982), the Escalators (1983–1984), Black Coffee (and the Beans) (1985), Way Back Five (1986), Romance Without Finance, Peaceful Anticipation Social Aid and Pleasure Club (1990), the Stephen Cummings Band (1986 and 1990–91), the Trees (a pop band with John McAll) (1990), Triple Peaks (1991), and the Rebecca Barnard Band (1992). The band Way Back Five were a "supergroup" which played funk and reggae covers and consisted of Barnard, Kate Ceberano, Phil Ceberano, James Reyne, and Steve Kearney (from Los Trio Ringbarkus).

From 1982 to 1992, Barnard refined her live performance and vocal skills and was an in-demand session singer, providing vocals and backing vocals on many Australian albums (including soundtracks and guest starring with various musicians). She went on to record and tour with Stephen Cummings, where she met Shane O'Mara (guitarist, multi-instrumentalist and producer).

In the late 1980s, Barnard featured on Tonight Live with Steve Vizard and The Big Gig as part of the inhouse band for the respective shows. The band Swinging Sidewalks, featured on The Big Gig, was a jazz band which featured the singers Kerri Simpson and Shelley Scown.

Barnard has credited the journalist Jill Singer with giving her the confidence to sing her own songs. When songwriting became a focus, she founded the band Rebecca's Empire in 1993, initially as a duo with O'Mara. In 1994, the band included Peter Luscombe and Bill McDonald. Michael den Elzen joined in 1995 when McDonald left to play with the band Frente!. The band toured extensively, supported acts such as Billy Bragg and Paul Kelly on their respective Australian tours, released three EPs and two albums (Way of All Things in 1996 and Welcome in 1999) and appeared on the Triple J Hottest 100 albums three years in a row. The track "Way of All Things" was featured on the soundtrack to the Australian film Blackrock and featured on the hit television series Good Guys Bad Guys. At this height of popularity, Barnard had her own cooking segment on Triple J called "Pot of Rock". Barnard has said of her popularity at this time that she had "wasted a real good opportunity to do more with the momentum that we had".

Rebecca's Empire formally disbanded in June 2000, when Barnard was mother to a young child and there was conflict with O'Mara. During and after 2000, many Australian bands recorded their albums in O'Mara and Barnard's home studio called Yikesville. Barnard indicated that she suffered writer's block from 2000 to 2005, hence a hiatus between Rebecca's Empire ending and her solo career commencing.

Barnard has been credited in providing the means for singer Vika Bull in starting her musical career when one of the backing vocalists in Barnard's band lost her voice. Bull, who was a receptionist at Platinum Studios in Melbourne, volunteered to fill the space.

== Solo career ==
Barnard has recorded three solo albums: Fortified (2006); Everlasting (2010); and, after a lengthy hiatus, Music for Listening and Relaxation (2017). Her first two albums are on her own record label, Ladybird and distributed by Shock Records.

In 2022, it was announced that Barnard would be releasing her first album of jazz standards entitled The Night We Called It A Day, which has been produced and arranged by Barnard's friend Monique diMattina.

None of Barnard's solo albums have charted on the Australian ARIA Charts, which has been attributed to limitations of promotional budgets and lack of airplay. She also cites ageism in the music industry as a factor for the lack of exposure.

=== Fortified (2006) ===
Fortified was co-produced by Barnard and her then husband, Shane O'Mara, and recorded at their home studio, Yikesville. She commenced writing material for the album in 2003. Fortified featured various Melbourne musicians such as Lisa Miller (backing vocals), Tim Rogers (backing vocals), Peter Jones (drums), Michael Barker of the John Butler Trio (drums) and Snout's Ross McLennan (bass). The album contains tracks penned by Barnard and co-writers, including Rosemary Milne who wrote the lyrics to the theme of Play School on the song "I Hurt" (a track about the dark side of love). Fortified features one cover song, the Bob Dylan song "Boots of Spanish Leather". The album is led with the exuberant track "Keep Smiling", a song which deals with a longstanding relationship (either family or a friend) and the feeling of being so close, disassociated and out of control as a person becomes older ("who would have guessed, we would be such a mess ... down the track").

Track listing

1. "Keep Smiling" – 5:06
2. "Little Boy" – 4:11
3. "Fortified" – 4:31
4. "Nobody Breaks This Heart" – 3:53
5. "Sirens" – 3:33
6. "Such A Bore" – 3:58
7. "The Moon" – 3:05
8. "I Hurt" – 4:42
9. "As Free As You Can Be"– 4:50
10. "Husbands"– 4:05
11. "Boots of Spanish Leather"– 5:57

=== Everlasting (2010) ===
The emotive Everlasting was recorded in New York City, and mixed at Tony Bennett's studio in Englewood New Jersey, during a two-week stint of recording in 2008, with the help of jazz pianist Barney McAll, a long-time friend of Barnard and the first album without the assistance of Shane O'Mara. Rebecca Barnard co-produced this album with Barney McAll, which deals with issues of loss and love. The track Everlasting deals with the death of her father, jazz musician, Len Barnard. Everlasting includes some mature pop songs infused with jazz, such as Born in a Shirt (a Russian metaphor for being born lucky). The tracks were all written by Barnard, except the track Seasong which is cover of a track by Robert Wyatt. The album was predominantly promoted by Barnard herself due to the lack of a promotional budget. Everlasting was made with the assistance of a VicARTS grant. Rebecca has said "How incredible that we live in a society, where most of us are to be free to be. The government giving a 49-year-old woman money to write and record music. There are thousands of women out there deserving of this. Women that struggle with the constant dilemma of creativity versus motherhood, hormonal weirdness, ageing parents, trying to be everything to everyone." The album received favourable reviews upon its release.

Everlasting was also the ABC Radio "disc of the week" (week starting 21 June 2010), where the album received some airplay. The ABC Radio review of the album indicated that Everlasting was "sultry, sassy and even a little bit sexy, Rebecca captures the sound of a woman on top of her game."

The musicians on the album (apart from Barnard and Barney McAll) include Matt Darriau (he plays a clarinet solo on the song You Are Loved), drummer Dan Rieser (ex-band member from Marcy Playground and drummer for Norah Jones), jazz musician Jonathan Maron on bass (from the band Groove Collective), and cellist Rufus Cappadocia.

Track listing

1. "Born in a Shirt" – 4:58
2. "Age 14" – 5:37
3. "Everlasting" – 4:51
4. "Fall and Walk" – 4:35
5. "Give Way" – 5:25
6. "Own Time" – 4:27
7. "Closer to You" – 3:14
8. "Seasong" – 3:09
9. "Little Ruffy"– 3:16
10. "You Are Loved"– 4:30

=== Music for Listening and Relaxation (2017) ===
The album was released on iTunes on 9 April 2017, and available on music streaming websites such as Tidal and Spotify, with the album being officially launched in Melbourne on 8 July 2017.

For this album, Barnard collaborated with Michael den Elzen, (who previously played bass with Rebecca's Empire on their 1996 album, Way of All Things). The album was recorded in den Elzen's studio in Central Victoria, called Waldemar's Studio. The album was a true collaboration between Rebecca and Michael, as they play all the instruments on the album. Rebecca on vocals, guitar, kalimba, percussion and keyboards, whilst Michael plays guitars, bass, drums, percussion, cello, double bass, keyboard, banjo, mandolin, tzoura, chimes vocal, and also undertook the field recording of the Australian bush, which features heavily on the album.

Barnard has indicated that the album was inspired by "the power of nature, love, the fragile beauty of planet Earth", and that this is reflected in the lyrics.

The title Music for Listening and Relaxation was inspired by an old record cover Barnard found in an opportunity shop in the Blue Mountains. Barnard indicated that the title "seemed to encapsulate the mood of the songs we were writing at the time, and our obsession with nature photographer Michael K Morcombe."

Barnard has indicated that in retrospect she should have called the album 'Music for Listening', "because some people seriously have thought it's a new age meditation record. Or I should have called it 'Music for Listening while Driving."

Barnard indicated that many of the tracks on the album focused on the fate of the world, where "Golden Hour" is about nature, "Black Coral" about aging and young girls, and "Crash and Burn" being inspired by Australian Greens founder Bob Brown – where Barnard was inspired by a quote of his "If it goes, it's gone forever" – Barnard said, "(It) just stuck in my mind, so you know, it is a bit negative.".

Track listing (All songs by Rebecca Barnard and Michael den Elzen)

1. "Everything We Knew" – 5:56
2. "Golden Hour" – 8:29
3. "Crash and Burn" – 5:34
4. "Sound Your Heart Makes" – 5:20
5. "All at Sea" – 4:24
6. "Black Coral" – 7:24
7. "Generations" – 2:32
8. "Smoking Gun" – 4:42
9. "Flash A New Love" – 4:46
10. "Melancholia"– 6:49

== Soundtracks and other appearances ==
In 1986, Barnard provided vocals to the songs "The Moon" and "Detective Love" on the motion picture soundtrack to Jamezee's Changing Name – Do You "Speak My Language?" album.

In 1995, Rebecca's Empire contributed to a compilation jazz and blues album called Up All Night, with a song written by O'Mara and Stephen Cummings called "One Step".

In 2002, Barnard contributed to the album The Women at the Well, an album featuring Australian female artists covering Paul Kelly songs. Her contribution was the song "She's Rare".

In 2013, Barnard contributed to The Boy Castaways movie soundtrack with the song "I Know Where You're Going". The film featured Paul Capsis, Tim Rogers, and Megan Washington. The film was directed by Michael Kantor.

In 2016, Barnard featured on the tracks "Now That Our Babies Have Grown", a duet with Paul Kelly, and "The Children" as part of the Pesky Bones project. The project features different Australian artists singing in diverse styles. It was established by the Boom Crash Opera founder Peter Farnan (with all songs written by him).

During 2011 and 2012, Barnard teamed with up with fellow Australian singers Monique Brumby and Kerri Simpson, performing the show "Sheilas of the '70s" (a tribute to female singers of that decade), where the show included comic dialogue and songs by Kate Bush, Donna Summer, Suzi Quatro, Melanie, Blondie, and Fleetwood Mac.

On 26 September 2017, Barnard, in an interview with Jon Faine (on ABC Radio Melbourne), indicated that it was difficult to "get bums on seats" in touring and promoting her own original work. Consequently, she was touring, doing jazz shows, and dedicated shows singing songs by Bob Dylan and Joni Mitchell.

Throughout 2017, Barnard and Monique diMattina toured their "Dao of Dylan" show, showing their appreciation of the talent of Bob Dylan in their music.

In April 2018, Barnard announced that she would be doing a series of shows (in June 2018) with Jodi Phillis (from the band The Clouds).

== Television and radio appearances ==
Barnard has appeared on RocKwiz (a music-focused TV show) in 2005, 2006 and 2009. She has also appeared on another music-oriented music quiz show, Spicks and Specks, in 2009 and 2024. In 1998, she appeared on the Good News Week show osted by Paul McDermott.

Barnard has appeared regularly on radio station 774 ABC Melbourne co-hosting with Derek Guille and, until the end of 2013, was a regular on 3RRR's The Word with Tracee Hutchison.

Barnard sings the theme song to the ABC TV series Back Roads.

== Other activities ==
She is a founding member of the Mirabel Foundation, which works to assist children who have been orphaned and abandoned due to parental drug use.

In 1992, Barnard contributed to an album with a group of other musicians called P.R.I.C.S (Performers Releasing Information About Clean Syringes), on the album called "Covered". Barnard contributed with a Bob Dylan penned song called "Serve Somebody". In 1994, she provided two tracks with P.R.I.C.S (now renamed Performers Releasing Information About Clean Syringes/Clean Sex) on the album "If You Do It Do It Safe" - the two tracks contributed were Pearl Jam's "Alive", and Prince's "Sign O' The Times". Barnard also contributed bass on a David Hosking-penned song called "Simply Survivors" which was sung by Shelly Scown.

She was running songwriting workshops for girls in the Melbourne western suburbs in 2007.

Barnard also conducts songwriting workshops with intellectually disabled adults in Ballarat (who have recently formed a band, the Funky Turtles) and at the Footscray Community Arts Centre with a Sudanese Choir.

Barnard was a regular performer at the annual Sacred Heart Mission of St Kilda fundraiser concert in Melbourne in the 2010s.

In 2011, Rebecca Barnard released a CD and download single called "A Mother Weeps" (with the Models Super Orchestra), featuring Cal McAlpine (drums), Mark Ferrie (bass), Billy Miller (lead guitar/harmony), Sean Kelly (rhythm guitar/harmony), Andrew Duffield (piano/harmony) and Jack Howard (trumpet/harmony). All profits of the single went to Cancer research. The motivation of the single, was a tribute to Gabby Larkin who died at the age of 16 from an extremely rare and aggressive form of cancer.

In 2015, Barnard submitted a piece of writing to the book From the Heart: A Collection from Women of Letters, as part of Women of Letters series curated by Marieke Hardy and Michaela McGuire. The book was published on 18 November 2015.

As of 2017 Barnard was a part-time music teacher at Northern College of the Arts and Technology (NCAT) in Melbourne. In 2015, as part of the course, some of the participants had the opportunity to perform live gigs with Barnard. The hands-on course aims to develop skills in songwriting, recording, rehearsal techniques, performance, stagecraft, vocal technique and more - all under the guidance of Barnard. She also had a residence at Melbourne's Caravan Club with the "Rebecca Barnard & Billy Millers Sing-Along", where participants are encouraged to sing, for both fun and therapeutic purposes.

== Personal life ==
Barnard married musician Shane O'Mara in 1989 and a son was born to them in 1996. The couple separated amicably in 2009.

== Discography ==
=== Solo albums ===
Album	Release date	Catalogue number	Producer	AUS (ARIA) Chart
Fortified	3 April 2006	LADYBIRD1	Rebecca Barnard & Shane O'Mara	-
Everlasting	7 May 2010	LADYBIRD2	Rebecca Barnard & Barney McAll	-
Music for Listening and Relaxation	9 April 2017	WILDFLOWER1	Rebecca Barnard & Michael den Elzen	-
The Night We Called It A Day	TBC	TBC	Monique diMattina	-

=== Albums with Rebecca's Empire ===
Album	Year	Record Company and Catalogue Number	Producer	AUS (ARIA) Chart
Way of All Things	1996	Eternity Recordings/Polydor (Australia) 5279802	Shane O'Mara	-
Welcome	1999	Festival B0000506O4	Shane O'Mara	-

=== Collaborations ===
Rebecca Barnard has appeared on the following artists/various albums:

- 1986 - Jamezee's Changing Name – Do You "Speak My Language?" soundtrack - providing vocals on "The Moon" and "Detective Love".
- 1988 - Harem Scarem, Lo & Behold - backing vocals.
- 1988 - Stephen Cummings, A New Kind of Blue - harmony vocals.
- 1991 - Stephen Cummings, Good Humour - backing vocals.
- 1992 - Stephen Cummings, Unguided Tour - backing vocals.
- 1992 - Chris Wilson, Landlocked - backing vocals, on the tracks "Big Mouth Baby" and "World Keeps Moving Sideways".
- 1992 - Stephen Cummings, Lovetown - harmony vocals (some harmonies).
- 1993 - Kate Ceberano, Kate Ceberano & Friends - backing vocals.
- 1993 - Kerri Simpson, Vévé - backing vocals on "Vévé" and "Cowboys".
- 1993 - Paul Grabowsky, Phoenix (Music From The ABC TV Series) - vocals on "Welcome to the World of Major Crime".
- 1993 - Tanya Lee, Perfect Moment - backing vocals on "Solid Ground".
- 1994 - Stephen Cummings, Falling Swinger - backing vocals.
- 1994 - The Black Sorrows, Lucky Charm - backing vocals on the track Down to the Sea.
- 1995 - Dave Graney 'n' the Coral Snakes, The Soft 'N' Sexy Sound - backing vocals.
- 1996 - Four Hours Sleep, More of Her - vocals on When I First Met You (with David McComb).
- 1997 - Renée Geyer, Dedicated - backing vocals on "Beautiful Morning" and "So I Can Love You".
- 1997 - Dave Graney 'n' the Coral Snakes, The Devil Drives - backing vocals.
- 1998 - Paul Kelly, Words and Music - duet with Paul Kelly on She Answers The Sun (Lazybones).
- 1998 - RRRewind In The Chapel - lead vocals singing the Divinyls "Sleeping Beauty" and AC/DC's "You Shook Me All Night Long".
- 1999 - Stephen Cummings, Spiritual Bum - backing vocals.
- 2001 - Deborah Conway, PC. The Songs of Patsy Cline - backing vocals.
- 2001 - Stephen Cummings, Skeleton Key - harmony vocals.
- 2001 - Snout, Managing Good Looks - backing vocals on Kickin' Up A Racket and Prince of Plainsong.
- 2002 - The Women at the Well - lead vocals on the Paul Kelly song She's Rare.
- 2002 - Icecream Hands, vocals on Broken UFO album.
- 2003 - Stephen Cummings, Firecracker - provides backing vocals.
- 2003 - Barb Waters, Rosa Duet - "Wipe Away My Tears" - vocals with Lisa Miller and Barb Waters.
- 2003 - Cell Count Blues - David Stephens & Emma O'Brien, 'Living Soul' "Original Songs of hope, love, laughter, courage, peace and the will to live, written by people whose lives have been touched by cancer."
- 2005 - Stephen Cummings, Love-O-Meter - backing vocals.
- 2005 - Tim Rogers, Dirty Ron/Ghost Songs - Backing vocals on I's Rather Be Krund and Social Pages.
- 2006 - The Audreys, Between Last Night and Us - Vocals on "Pale Dress".
- 2006 - RocKwiz Duets, duet with Tim Rogers on Stop Draggin' My Heart Around (live).
- 2006 - You Am I, Convicts - backing vocals.
- 2007 - Stephen Cummings, Space Travel - backing vocals.
- 2007 - RocKwiz Duets Vol.2 - It's A Long Way to the Top - duet with Kutcha Edwards (live).
- 2012 - Tim Rogers, Rogers Sings Rogerstein - additional vocals on "Out of Our Tiny Lil Minds' & 'The FJ Holden'.
- 2013 - David Bridie, Take The Next Illusionary Exit - guest vocals.
- 2014 - Guy Pearce, Broken Bones
- 2015 - Dan Lethbridge, Inner Western - vocals on "Close the Deal" and "Do No Harm".
- 2016 - Pesky Bones project, "The Children" and "Now That Our Babies Have Grown" duetting with Paul Kelly.
