= Tines of Stars Unfurled =

Studio album by Tim Rogers & The Twin Set
- Released: 24 February 2023
- Genre: Alt-country
- Labels: Virgin Music, Universal Music
- Producer: Jimi Maroudas

Tines of Stars Unfurled is a studio album by You Am I frontman Tim Rogers and the Twin Set, a sequel to their 1999 album What Rhymes with Cars and Girls. It reached number 4 on the Australian albums chart.

== Details ==
Tines of Stars Unfurled is a sequel to What Rhymes with Cars and Girls, Rogers' first solo album from 1999. The titles of the albums rhyme and all the songs refer to songs on the earlier album.

The writing started with "Been So Good, Been So Far", an answer song to "You've Been So Good to Me So Far", Which contains the lines "forgot all my girlfriends and I even washed my hair and I did all that couples stuff and I pretended that I cared." Rogers said, "Every time I heard that line, I’d think, 'No, I didn’t have girlfriends, I had one girlfriend. And I wasn't pretending that I cared. I really cared. And I thought, "God, who’s the guy who wrote those songs?"' He added, "I needed to correct some wrongs, even if just for myself. I rewrote each song on this record about three times. Sylistically, they're all acoustically based. But they all had different tempos and different strumming patterns and different chords and melodies. So different songs essentially, but with the same lyrics."

Rogers said he may have been inspired to revisit his earlier work by Jennifer Egan. He said, "she wrote a book called The Candy House that came out a year ago. It's sort of a sequel to her previous book, A Visit from the Goon Squad. It was the way she talks about it, and maybe that was a prod as well. So rather than thinking I needed to write some wrongs – as I’ve said in the past – it was a bit of just a writing exercise as well."

The inspiration for "That Arse-Kicking song was, Rogers said, "Simply retelling a night in Birdsville where a gentleman who looked and smelled like he'd had a beating asked me to play him a tune. I hope he enjoyed a little of it because I sure enjoyed his company, if not his breath. But I’m nitpicking here. We looked after each other."

Many of the same musicians from the previous album returned for Tine of Stars Unfurled. Rogers said, "We wanted to get as many of the original members together that we could, but through death and relocation that wasn’t possible."

== Reception ==
The Courier-Mail said, "the alt-rock of You Am I is traded for the stringy alt-country of The Twin Set. The Beatlesque string crescendo of title-ish track Tines of Stars sets the mood for an album of reflection on his demons, parents and children, train stations and friends present or absent. And Rogers' high, whimsical vocals often recall those of Tim Finn. Forte wrote, "Presented with the wisdom of a hardened barfly; the wit of John Prine and the vulnerability of an AA meeting, Rogers' newest release conveys more than just a stylistic reinvention, instead feeling like the debut of a whole new Rogers entirely."

== Track listing ==
1. Tines of Stars 2:54
2. Been So Good, Been So Far 5:01
3. I Left My Heart in a Country Church Hall 4:50
4. Can You Just Do It for Me Friend 4:30
5. That Arse Kicking Song 4:31
6. A Quiet Anniversary 3:34
7. Twenty Two 4:17
8. I Live Near a Train Station 6:43
9. Up-A-Get (Tá Brón Orm) 6:24
10. Get High, Support the Band 4:20
11. The Drinks They Drained as I Drove Away 7:05

== Personnel ==
- Tim Rogers – guitar, vocals
- Jen Anderson – strings and arrangements
- Mark Wallace – accordion
- Ed Bates – pedal steel
- Sally Dastey – vocals
- David Lane – guitar
- Jeff Consi – drums
- Peter Lawler – vocals
- Richie Bradbeer – bass

== Charts ==
Chart performance for Tines of Stars Unfurled
Chart (2023)	Peak position
ARIA Top 50 Albums Chart	4
