= My Better Half (album) =

Studio album by T'N'T
- Released: September 2006
- Studio: Yikesville
- Label: Liberation Music

Tex Perkins chronology
Sweet Nothing (2003)	My Better Half (2006)	No. 1's & No. 2's (2007)

Tim Rogers chronology
Dirty Ron/Ghost Songs (2005)	My Better Half (2006)	The Luxury of Hysteria (2007)

My Better Half is a collaborative studio album by Tex Perkins and Tim Rogers, credited to TnT. It was initially meant to be an extended play to sell at shows, but the recording process resulted in a full-length album. The album was released in September 2006 and peaked at number 31 on the ARIA Charts.

== Track listing ==
1. "Everybody Hates You When You're Popular" – 2:22 (Rogers, Perkins, Kristyna)
2. "Semi Auto-Duo-Bio" – 3:28 (Rogers, Perkins)
3. "Any Old Time" – 3:52 (Rogers)
4. "Half of Nothing" – 4:46 (Perkins)
5. "Turn Me Loose" – 4:03 (Rynoski, Paul Dean)
6. "Dinosaurs" – 3:19 (Rogers)
7. "Someone Above" – 4:35 (Rogers, Perkins)
8. "You Should See Her Now" – 2:33 (Rogers)
9. "Here I Am" – 2:30 (Perkins)
10. "Hate This City" – 3:29 (Rogers)
11. "Fire Escape" – 2:22 (Kim Salmon)
12. "Come On and Love Me" – 3:50 (Paul Stanley)
13. "Tonight's the Night" – 4:57 (Rod Stewart)
14. "Cunnilingus" (hidden unlisted track) – 4:14 (Rogers, Perkins)

== Personnel ==
- Tex Perkins – vocals, guitar, bass, percussion
- Timothy Adrian Rogers – vocals, guitar, mandolin, keyboards, autoharp, percussion

with:

- Shane O'Mara – banjo (track 3), bass (tracks 1, 3, 13), lap steel guitar (track 9), lead guitar (track 10)
- Shane Walsh – double bass (tracks 2, 4, 5, 7)

== Charts ==
Chart (2006)	Peak position
Australian Albums (ARIA)	31
