= Rogers Sings Rogerstein =

Studio album by Tim Rogers
- Released: 24 August 2012
- Recorded: Yikesville Studios, Yarraville
- Length: 42min
- Label: ABC Music

Tim Rogers chronology
The Luxury Of Hysteria (2007)	Rogers Sings Rogerstein (2012)	The Rules of Attraction (2015)

Rogers Sings Rogerstein is the fifth studio album by You Am I frontman, Tim Rogers. The album was released on 24 August 2012.

== Track listing ==
1. All Or Nothing - 4:00
2. Drivin At Night- 4:25
3. One O The Girls - 2:54
4. Part Time Dads - 3:13
5. Out Of Our Tiny Lil' Minds - 2:49
6. Go On Out, Get Back Home - 3:32
7. The FJ Holden - 3:46
8. Walkin Past The Bars - 2:50
9. I Love You Just As You Are, Now Change - 3:06
10. Didn't Plan To Be Here Either, Baby - 2:58
11. Beefy Jock Guys And Modern Dance Music - 3:35
12. If Yer Askin, I'm Dancin' - 3:31
13. Let's Be Dreadful - 2:17

== Personnel ==
- Tim Rogers - Guitar, Vocals
- Shane O'Mara
- Peter Lawler
- Melanie Robinson
- Bruce Haymes
- Ben Hendry
- John Bedgegood
- Shel Rogerstein
- Lizanne Richards - additional vocals on 'All Or Nothing'
- Sal Kimber - additional vocals on 'If Yer Askin' & "Walking Past The Bars'
- Rebecca Barnard - additional vocals on "Out Of Our Tiny Lil Minds' & 'The FJ Holden'

== Charts ==
Chart performance for Rogers Sings Rogerstein
Chart (2012)	Peak position
Australian Albums (ARIA)	45
