= Aidan Fennessy =

Australian playwright, stage director, and actor (died 2020)

Aidan Fennessy (died 13 September 2020) was an Australian playwright, stage director and actor, known for his work with the Melbourne Theatre Company (MTC), where he was at one time associate director.

Fennessy's career began in Melbourne in the 1990s, involving his talents as writer, director and actor. He acted in a number of television series, including Neighbours, Introducing Gary Petty, Blue Heelers and City Homicide. In 2012, he was the programming director at MTC.

His play, National Interest (2012), was commissioned by the MTC and the Black Swan State Theatre Company (Western Australia) on the theme of the Balibo Five. Fennessy's cousin, Tony Stewart, was one of the five journalists who became known as the Balibo Five after they were murdered in Balibo, East Timor, in 1975. The play focuses on Stewart's family, in particular his mother and sister, as well as the Indonesian Government's cover-up, and the Australian Government's handling of the affair. The play incorporates media coverage, speeches, court transcripts, and other factual material, into the "deeply personal story". It was performed in Perth and Melbourne during 2012.

Fennessy had two children with his partner, the writer Nova Weetman. He died from cancer during one of the lockdowns in Melbourne arising from the COVID-19 pandemic in Australia.

== Selected works ==
Plays written by Fennessy include:

- The Architect
- National Interest
- What Rhymes With Cars And Girls (a musical based on the album What Rhymes With Cars And Girls by Tim Rogers, staged by MTC in 2015)
- Chilling and Killing My Annabel Lee (Playbox/Malthouse),
- The House On The Lake (Black Swan)
- The Way Things Work (Griffin, Red Stitch)
- The Heartbreak Choir

== Accolades ==
- The Trade (2002), written for the Melbourne International Comedy Festival, won the 2002 Barry Award (since renamed the Melbourne International Comedy Festival Award.
- Chilling and Killing My Annabel Lee (2006) won the Wal Cherry Award and was shortlisted for the Victorian Premier's Literary Award.
- National Interest (2012, script) won the People's Choice award at the Victorian Premier's Literary Awards in 2012.
- What Rhymes With Cars And Girls (2015) was nominated for a Helpmann Award for Best New Australian Work in 2015.
