= Sophia Rosoff =

American pianist and educator

Sophia Rosoff (January 26, 1924 - November 22, 2017) was an American pianist and educator, and a founder of the Abby Whiteside Foundation.

She was a co-editor of the reprinted collection of Abby Whiteside's writings, along with Joseph Prostakoff.

Her pupils have included the jazz pianists Brad Mehldau, Jeremy Siskind, Fred Hersch, Barry Harris, Ethan Iverson, Benoit Delbecq, Angelica Sanchez, Monique diMattina and Aaron Parks.
