= Community Cup =

Australian Football Match

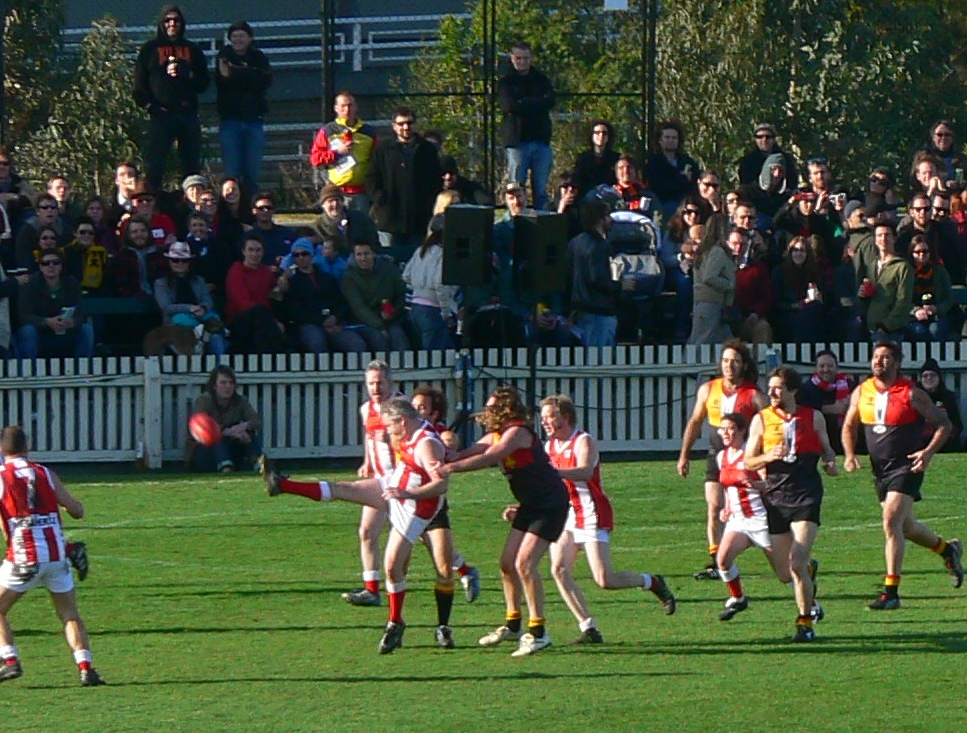
- Action from the 2007 Community Cup in Melbourne between the PBS FM Megahertz and the Rockdogs
- Genre: Celebrity sports match, Charity event
- Dates: AFL split round, June
- Frequency: annual
- Locations: Victoria Park, Abbotsford, Victoria (2017-), Elsternwick Park, Elsternwick (2009-2016); Junction Oval, St Kilda (1998-2008); Ross Gregory Oval, St Kilda (1997)
- Years active: 33 (includes recesses in 2008, 2020 and 2021)
- Inaugurated: 1993
- Participants: Two local community representative teams
- Attendance: 23,000 (record 2007 in Melbourne)
- Patron: 10,000
- Organiser: Reclink Australia
- Website: http://www.communitycup.com.au

The Community Cup (known as the Reclink Community Cup since 2009 under naming rights) is an annual charity event which features a celebrity mixed-gender Australian rules football match. It is noted for its cult following, celebrity appearances and media profile. First run in Melbourne in 1993, it has since expanded nationally, being hosted in Sydney (2012-), Adelaide and Perth/Fremantle (2015-), Hobart and Brisbane (2016-). And Canberra (2017)

Its origins date back to 1993 in Melbourne with the formation of social teams composed of radio station employees (Megahertz) and musicians (Rockdogs). The first match was played in Melbourne and was later played each year during the Australian Football League (AFL) split round. The Melbourne event remains the most popular, attracting a crowd of around 12,000 each year and raising around $250,000 for Reclink Australia.

In contrast to today's strict AFL codes of conduct the Reclink Community Cup is promoted as embracing grassroots community amateur football and as a result it is promoted as "kid and dog friendly" with quarter and half time pitch invasions for traditional kick-to-kick.

== History ==
The teams involved in the cup date back to 1990. Espy Rockdogs were founded in 1990 as a social footy team to play against Chasers. The team played in a charity match against the Tote Hotel in 1993 and raised $500.

It first became known as the "Community Cup" in 1997 when 3RRR Program Manager James Young proposed the creation of the 3RRR and PBS FM Megahertz to play against the Rockdogs and raise money for St Kilda's Sacred Heart Mission.

That match organised held at Ross Gregory Oval in St Kilda. Drawing a crowd of over 2,000 people it was successful in raising over A$6,000.

Due to the interest generated, Sacred Heart Mission assumed its organisation and a larger venue, Junction Oval, a former Victorian Football League stadium was chosen to accommodate the larger crowds.

The 2005 event packed the Junction Oval to capacity, attracting 23,000 people. In 2006, despite the installation of temporary fencing to accommodate more spectators, the stadium was once more packed to capacity.

The 2007 event introduced an entry charge $5 for the first time, previous events were by gold coin donation. Despite the entry fee, a similarly large crowd attended.

In May 2008 Sacred Heart Mission withdrew due to increased costs of running it. RRR tried to keep the event alive but there was not enough time to secure a charity partner to host the event on the planned date and much to the disappointment of the St Kilda community, the event was shelved.

The Cup secured a new charity in 2009, Reclink Australia, and it was moved to Elsternwick Park, held on 21 June. A positive online feedback poll result saw news radio stations ABC Local Radio and Radio National cover the match for the first time. With the new venue, the event took a hit in its attendance, drawing just 8,000, however in 2010 attendances rebounded to over 10,000.

The 2011 match drew 12,000 people and raised over $120,000.

In 2012, the match was held outside of Melbourne for the first time, playing a match at Henson Park in Marrickville, Sydney.

In 2015, the Community Cup launched in Adelaide (featuring the mighty Rockatoos versus the Anchors) and in Perth, while 2016 sees the game also launch in Hobart and Brisbane.

In 2017, the Reclink Community Cup was held at Victoria Park in Abbotsford with Spiderbait and The Peep Tempel headlining the event. Courtney Barnett and Remi supported. This year also saw it first played in Canberra.

The 2019 cup was held at Victoria Park, with Magic Dirt headlining, to celebrate the 25th playing of the cup (excluding the missed year in 2008). Anthony Albanese was in attendance.

The cup was not played in 2020. In 2021 it was played in Brisbane, Hobart and Fremantle only, no Melbourne match.

In 2022 the cup returned to Victoria Park to a crowd of 12,000.

In 2023, the 30 year anniversary was celebrated.

In 2025 a green vinyl compilation record featuring the musical history of the cup was released including tracks from Paul Kelly, TISM, Baker Boy, Hiatus Kaiyote and Archie Roach.

== The match ==
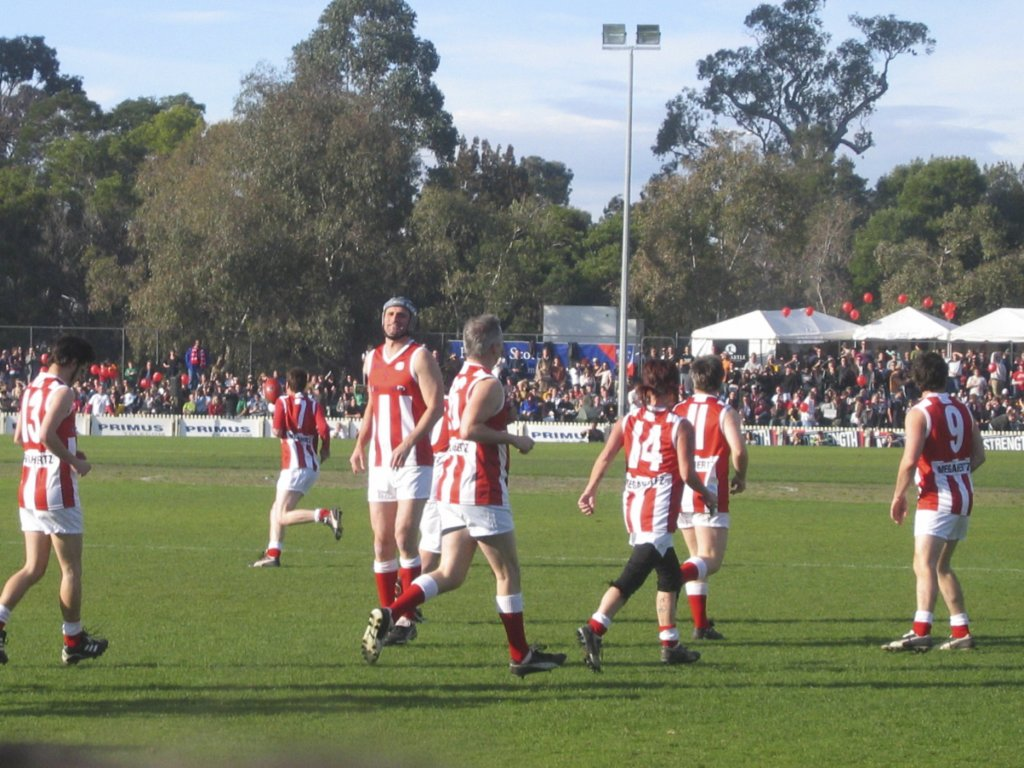
Megahertz warming up in the 2005 Community Cup

The football match features two teams of non-footballing local communities: the 3RRR/3PBS Megahertz, which consists of personnel from Melbourne's two main community radio stations, and the Rock Dogs, a mix of former and present musicians. The Megahertz wear red and white, and the Rockdogs wear black, red white and yellow guernseys. The match is usually umpired by a mix of comedians and notable music industry people, costumed according to a chosen theme, such as 'Do You Love Me?' in 2011 as a tribute to Nick Cave.

=== Individual awards ===
The match has been followed by the presentation of a number of medals named after recently deceased musicians, including Dave McComb, Paul Hester, Grant McLennan, Tim Hemensley, Norm Fagg, Andrew Entsch and Stuart Speed. The Dave Taranto Medal, named for a former PBS-RRR comic presenter, is awarded to the "most silly Megahertz". The only living medal was the Stephen Hurley Medal, named for a member of the first Rockdogs side in 1993 who broke his spine in November that year and now uses a wheelchair.

The Steve Connolly Medal is still awarded for the best on ground, and is presented by The Age sports writer Rohan Connolly in memory of his brother.

=== Celebrity appearances ===
Celebrities to have participated in a match include:

- Angus Sampson (2003)
- Samantha Lane (2003)
- Rupert Betheras (2009)
- Mick Harvey (2010- regular)
- Dave Larkin of Dallas Crane (2010)
- Paul Kelly (2011 Rockdogs coach)
- Tex Perkins (2014 Rockdogs coach)
- Urthboy (2014)
- Jude Bolton (2014)
- The Meanies (Link and Wally)
- Tim Rogers (regular for many years)
- Brian Nankervis (played and umpired - 2012)
- Kram (regular for many years)
- Peter Rowsthorn (player and umpire)
- Anthony Albanese (2015)
- Simona Castricum (2017)
- Ashley Naylor (2019)
- Sam Pang
- Courtney Barnett
- Dan Sultan
- Penny Wong
- Adalita
- Felix Riebl (2021)
- Peter Malinauskas (2022)
- Kyam Maher (2022)
- Katrine Hildyard (2022)
- Steven Marshall (2022)
- Tammy Franks (2022)
- Chad Cornes (2022)
- Nathan Bassett (2022)
- Nikki Gore (2022)
- Tory Shepherd (2022)
- Jessica Braithwaite
- Peter Goers (2022)

== Entertainment ==
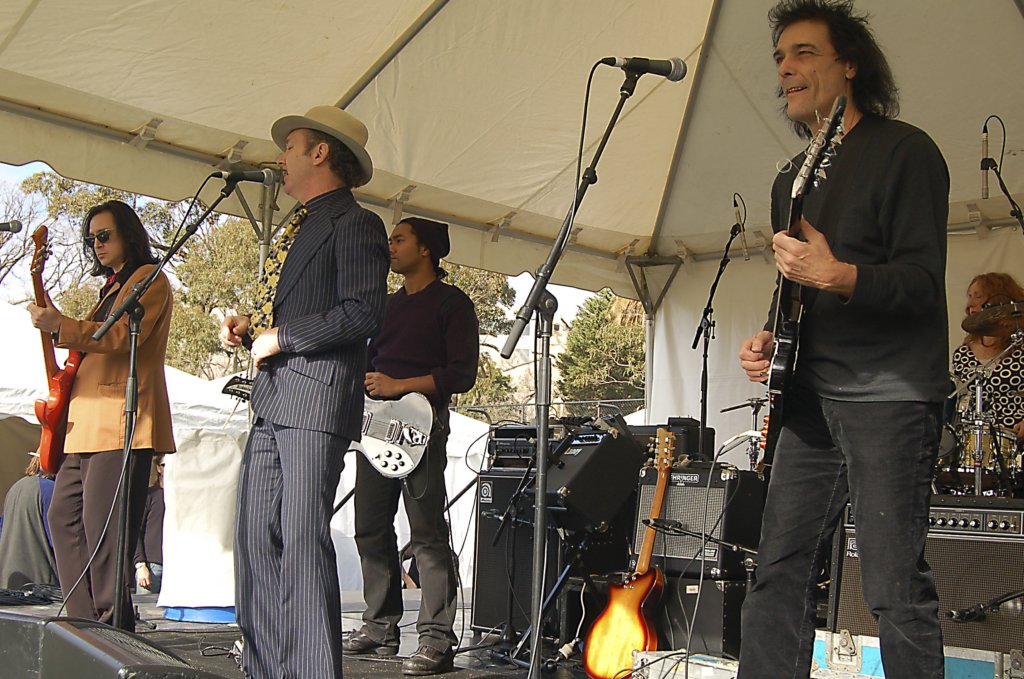
Dave Graney and the Lurid Yellow Mist at the 2006 Community Cup

The match itself is accompanied by a two-to-three-hour-long concert, along with entertainment at half time, and usually sees notable acts volunteering their time to entertain the Community Cup audience. Notable performances include Paul Kelly, TISM and Magic Dirt (2004), one-off reunion concerts by Rebecca's Empire and Weddings Parties Anything (2005) and Dave Graney (2006) and Mach Pelican (2007). Paul Kelly returned again to accompany Renée Geyer on harmonica while she sang "Waltzing Matilda" at the 2006 Cup, with state sports minister and former VFL footballer Justin Madden tossing the coin to decide which team was kicking for which goal.

In 2009, live acts included Cosmic Psychos, Kram, Doll Squad, Jordie Lane, and The Scared Weird Little Guys. The 2010 line-up included The Blackeyed Susans, Money For Rope, Little Freddie and The Pops, Living End, and Nick Barker and the Reptiles. Streakers, both male and female, also made appearances.
