= Spit Polish =

Studio album by Tim Rogers
- Released: 26 April 2004
- Genre: Alternative rock
- Label: Festival Records

Tim Rogers chronology
What Rhymes with Cars and Girls (1999)	Spit Polish (2004)	Dirty Ron/Ghost Songs (2005)

Alternative cover
- Standard jewel case cover

Spit Polish is the second studio album by Tim Rogers, and the first to feature his backing band The Temperance Union. The album was released on 26 April 2004 as a digipack, and was later re-released in a standard jewel case. A vinyl LP was also pressed for sale at gigs. 'Fiction' was released as a radio single.

== Track listing ==
1. "Some Fella's Heartbreaker" – 3:03
2. "Fiction" – 3:09
3. "Goldfields Blues" – 3:01
4. "Stray Dog Bruise" – 3:39
5. "Where the Wind Don't Blow" – 3:56
6. "The Mess" – 5:37
7. "Time & Distance" – 3:37
8. "King of the Hill" – 3:15
9. "I Only Understand Her in the Rain" – 4:00
10. "Letter to Gene" – 3:39
11. "Damn Songs" – 2:39
12. "Fun (Part One)" – 4:32

All songs written by Tim Rogers.

== Personnel ==
- Tim Rogers – guitar, vocals
- Shane O'Mara – guitar
- Ian Kitney – drums, percussion
- Stuart Speed – bass guitar
- Lisa Miller – vocals on "Damn Songs"

== Charts ==
Chart performance for Spit Polish
Chart (2002)	Peak position
Australian Albums (ARIA)	52
