= Monique diMattina =

Australian jazz pianist, singer and composer

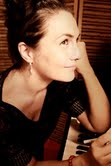
- Born: Melbourne, Australia
- Education: University of Melbourne
- Occupations: Pianist, singer-songwriter, composer, playwright
- Children: 2
- Website: moniquedimattina.com

Monique diMattina is an Australian singer-songwriter, performer and playwright. diMattina wrote the book, music and lyrics to STELLA: A New Australian Musical on the life of Australian author Stella Miles Franklin. diMattina has released six studio albums and one live album, including Nola's ark (New Orleans), Live at the 55 (NYC), Everybody Loves Somebody (Melbourne) and three solo piano albums.

diMattina composes and performs in a range of genres encompassing jazz roots, country, blues, neo-classical and contemporary styles.

== Personal life and education ==
diMattina grew up in Melbourne, Australia. She studied law at the University of Melbourne before taking up jazz piano and composition at Victorian College of the Arts, focussing her masters thesis on pianist Wynton Kelly.

diMattina lives in Melbourne with her two daughters. She teaches at the Melbourne Conservatorium of Music and Monash University.

== Career ==
From 2000-2009 diMattina was based in New York City, initially on a Fulbright scholarship. While in NYC, diMattina studied with Sophia Rosoff, Fred Hersch, Sam Yahel and Barry Harris, taught at the Henry Street Music School, worked on digital orchestrations for Lars von Trier's Dancer in the Dark starring Björk, played the 55 Bar, The Living Room, Rockwood Music Hall and Joe's Pub, and opened for Lou Reed.

In 2002, diMattina released Live at the 55, an instrumental collection of covers and originals with Adam Armstrong on bass, Kim Thompson on drums, diMattina on wurlitzer piano and K. T Tolhurst on pedal steel. diMattina toured in Europe, Japan, China and Sydney as principal pianist in Disney's The Lion King orchestra.

In 2009 diMattina released her first solo piano album, Senses, followed by Welcome Stranger, in which she sings and plays piano. The album mostly contains original songs, with a cover of Paul Kelly's "Dumb Things" in a New Orleans style. In 2011 diMattina released her second solo piano album Sun signs, designed around the twelve signs of the zodiac. During this period she performed a regular segment called "Shaken Not Rehearsed" on radio station 3RRR 102.7 FM (Tim Thorpe's Vital Bits program) and later on ABC 774, playing bespoke songs on air, written within the hour to listener requests. diMattina also performed in the Clare Bowditch musical theatre piece Eva based on the life of jazz singer Eva Cassidy, opened for Chris Botti on his Australian tour and was musical director of Tapestry: The Music of Carole King starring Vika Bull and Debra Byrne.

In 2012 diMattina recorded Nola's ark, at Piety Street Recording in New Orleans with producer Mark Bingham and musicians including Leroy Jones on trumpet, Matt Perrine on bass and June Yamagishi on guitar. Many of the eight original songs on the album originated in the "Shaken Not Rehearsed" segment. Nola's Ark was released on Head Records in 2013.

Of album Everybody Loves Somebody Martin Jones wrote "Monique diMattina has reached that hallowed ground where influences and inspirations coalesce to produce a unique voice. On this new album, jazz sensibilities and classic songwriting skills blend to produce something reminiscent of the jazzier shadows of Rickie Lee Jones or Joni Mitchell..some of the approaches, and aesthetics draw from jazz, but first and foremost it's about the singer and her songs."

diMattina's third solo piano album Tides (2021) comprises ten notated neo-classical compositions. In 2022 diMattina arranged and produced Australian singer-songwriter Rebecca Barnard's jazz album The Night We Called It A Day.

diMattina has cited J. S. Bach, Nina Simone, Sidney Bechet, Édith Piaf, Bob Dylan, Astor Piazzolla, Rickie Lee Jones, Lili Boulanger, Donny Hathaway and Allen Toussaint as influences on her music.

== STELLA: A New Australian Musical ==
diMattina wrote the book, music and lyrics to STELLA: A New Australian Musical on the life of Australian author Stella Miles Franklin. STELLA debuted at the Alexander Theatre Monash in June 2026.

== Discography ==
=== Albums ===
Year	Album	Label
2002	Live @ The 55	Elwood Records
2008	Senses	Head Records
2010	Welcome stranger	Head Records
2011	Sun signs	Head Records
2013	Nola's ark	Head Records
2015	Everybody loves somebody	Head Records
2021	Tides	

=== Single ===
- "Say My Name" (2012)

=== Appearances on other artists' recordings ===
- Clare Bowditch - The Winter I Chose Happiness
- Belinda Moody – Moody's Brood
- Martha Baartz – Twelve Salutations
- Andrew Swann – The Braves
- Andrew Swann – Southside Blues
- Andrew Swann – Nasty Cook
- Andrew Firth – Montage
- Tanya Lee Davies - The Duetting Damsel
