= Kerri Simpson =

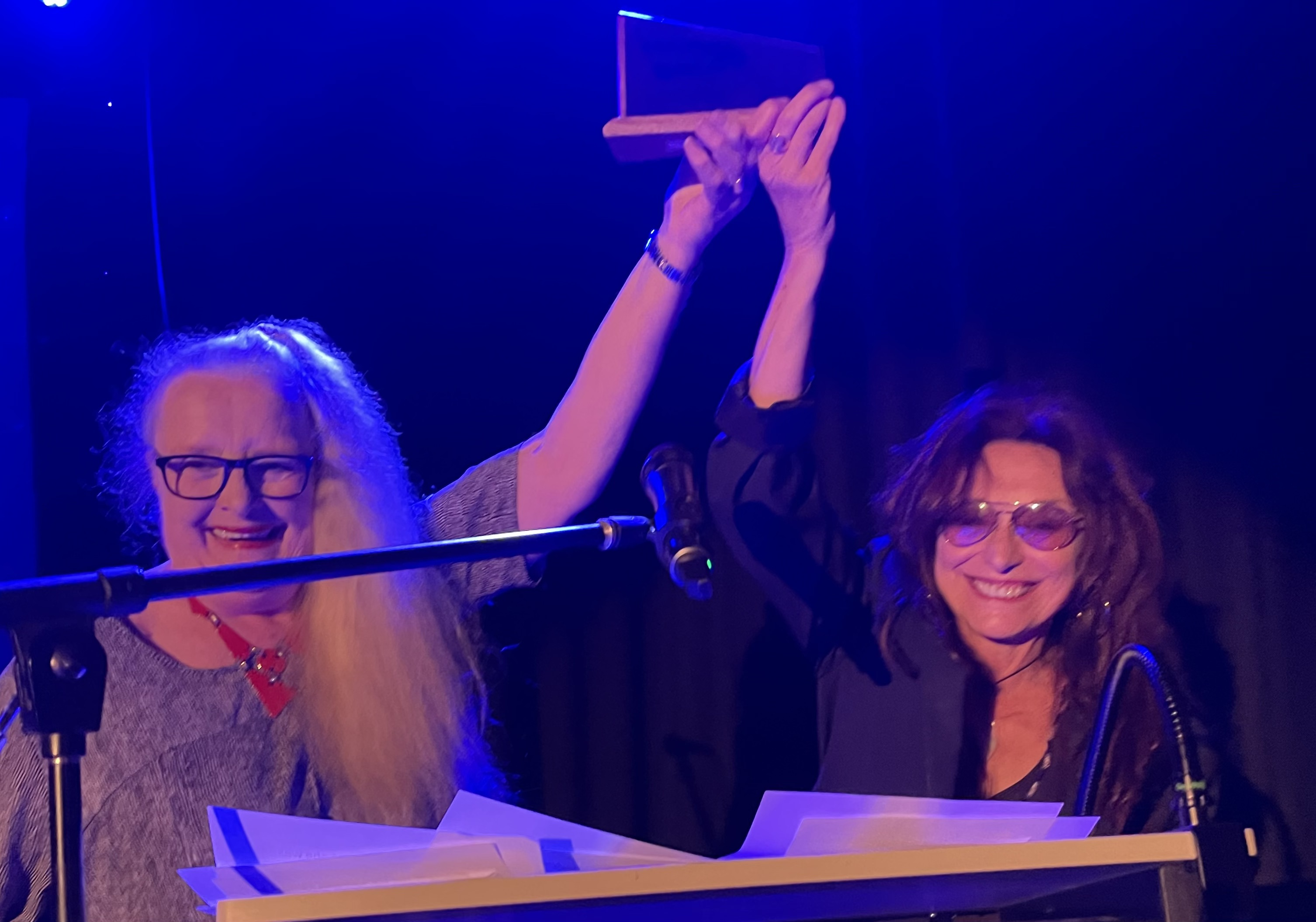
- Kerri Simpson accepting Blues Music Victoria Hall of Fame award

Background information
- Born
- Origin: Melbourne, Victoria
- Genres: Blues
- Years active: 1982–present

Kerri Simpson is a blues singer from Melbourne. In 2024 Simpson was inducted into Blues Music Victoria's Hall of Fame. Her band Opelousas, a trio with Allison Ferrier and Anthony 'Shorty' Shortte, won Music Victoria Awards in 2024 for best blues work, and best blues album in 2019 with Opelousified. Simpson's album Confessin' the Blues was nominated for a 1999 ARIA Award for Best Blues & Roots Album. In 2005 Simpson won Chain Australia Blues Music Awards for best female vocals.

Predominantly a blues musician, she has also performed country with 'Kerri Simpson and the Prodigal Sons', gospel with the Gospel Belles and Ska with The Ska Vendors. Gospel Belles were formed in 2006 and consists of singers Kerri Simpson, Kelly Auty, Marisa Quigley and Diana Wolfe. The Ska Vendors is a Ska band fronted by Melbourne Ska Orchestra's Steve Montgomery alongside Simpson, Steve Phillips, Chris Rogers, Johnny Holmes, Dean Hilson, Russell Roberts, Michael Havir and Pat Powell.

== Discography ==
=== Albums ===
Title	Details
VeVe	Released: 1993; Label: Kerri Simpson (SPUD 001 CD); Format: CD
The Arousing (with VeVe)	Released: June 1995; Label: Kerri Simpson (SPUD CD 002); Format: CD; Note: Recorded at Periscope June 1994
Speak (with VeVe)	Released: 1996; Label: Karmic Hit (KH 005); Format: CD
Confessin' the Blues	Released: 1998; Label: Viridian (VR028); Format: CD
Vodou Songs of the Spirits	Released: 2001; Label: Kerri Simpson (SPUD CD 3); Format: CD
Maybe By Midnight	Released: 2007; Label: Origin Records (OR077); Format: CD
Sun Gonna Shine	Released: 2008; Label: Belmore Records (BEL009); Format: CD
Fortune Favoured Me	Released: 2012; Label: Kerri Simpson (KATB2); Format: CD, digital
4AM	Released: 2013; Label: Kerri Simpson (KABD3); Format: CD, digital
Bluebirds	Released: 2017; Label: Independent; Format: CD

=== Singles ===
Title	Details
Higher	Released: 1991; Label: Razor Cuts (X14963); Format: 12", 7" Vinyl 45 RPM
Kiss Her Goodbye	Released: 1992; Label: Mushroom (X14411); Format: 12", 33 ⅓ RPM

=== Opelousas Releases ===
Title	Details
Opelousas Baby	Released: 2018; Label: Format: Limited edition EP
Opelousified	Released: 2019; Label: Format: CD, digital
Dear John	Released: 2019; Label: Format: Digital single
Third Jinx Blues	Released: 2020; Label: Format: single digital, vinyl
The JVG Radio Method Mix	Released: 2020; Label: Format: Digital single
Opelousafried	Released: 2024; Label: Self Release; Format: Vinyl

=== Collaborations, Compilations, Projects ===
- Jeff Lang: More Life (2024)
- Hey Gringo: Keep on Moving (2024)
- Belmar Records tringle: Tuskegee Airman (2024)
- David Bridie: It's been a while since our last correspondence (2023)
- Stranger Cole, Ska Vendors: More Ska single (2023)
- Belmar Records Grubby Rhythm and Soul Vol 1 (2021)
- Bruce Hearn and the Machinists Live at the Athenaeum: A tribute to Woody Guthrie (2020)
- Hey Gringo: Not the same planet (2018)
- Glenn Skuthorpe: Wild winds of Dooga (2018)
- Glen Skuthorpe: Small Change (2017)
- Glen Skuthorpe: See My World (2016)
- Barb Waters, Suzannah Espie, Alison Ferrier: Bluebirds (2017)
- Belmar Records Top 10 Vol 5 (2017)
- Belmar Records Top 10 Vol 6 (2019)
- Ska Vendors: Feeling Fine (2015)
- Suzannah Espie: Mother’s Not Feeling Herself Today (2015)
- Wendy Rule: Black Snake (2015)
- A band called Milton: Kiss single (2014)
- Andy Szikla: Dark Valley (2013)
- David Bridie: Take the next illusionary exit (2013)
- Geoff Achison and Chris Wilson: Box of Blues (2012)
- Just Music [Jesuit Social Services] (2012)
- The Gospel Belles (2010)
- Diana Wolfe: Rutherglen Road (2010)
- The Ears: Dogs in Space (2010)
- Suzannah Espie: First and Last Hotel (2009)
- Rory Ellis:Two Feathers [2008]
- Hau About: I am woman. Compilation for the women of East Timor (2008)
- Sarah Carroll: Yippee (2006)
- Rory Ellis: The Rushes (2005)
- Telek: Amette (2004)
- Cyndi Boste: Scrambled Eggs (2004)
- David Bridie: Music Totempted (Film soundtrack 2002)David Bridie: Act of Free Choice (2000)
- Wendy Rule: Deity (1998)
- Wendy Rule: Zero (1996)
- Stephen Cummings: Four Hours Sleep album, She Wanted To Fight (1996)
- Turkey Neck: Lasso (1996)
- Native Tongue: Loudspeaker (1996)
- PsyHarmonics Comp. #1 [Psyharmonics] (1994)
- Swinging Sidewalks: Attic Jazz (1994)
- P.R.I.C.S: Covered (1992)
- Sophisticated Boom Boom: Don’t mess with Bill (1986)
- Sophisticated Boom Boom: Heatwave (1986)
- The Five Aces: Tough Love (1983)

=== Film / Soundtracks ===
- Bran Nue Dae (Australia 2010)
- Tempted soundtrack (US 2000)
- Last Drinks [Australia 1998)
- Island of Salvation [US 1998)
- Nomad SBS TV (Australia 1993)
- Big Night Out (Australia 1990)

=== Print ===
- Music City: A slice of the Melbourne music scene (2024)
- Wangaratta festival of Jazz and Blues: 30 years (2022)
- WOW: Celebrating 20 years ofWay out West roots music club (2021)
- The Singers companion by C. Sullivan (2019)
- Blues Portrait: A profile of the Australian blues scene by P. Bailey (2019)
- Roots: How Melbourne became the live music capital of the world by C. Horne (2019)
- Witch: A Magikal Year – chapter: ‘Lakes of Memory’ by F. Horne (1999)

== Awards and nominations ==
=== ARIA Music Awards ===
The ARIA Music Awards is an annual awards ceremony held by the Australian Recording Industry Association.

Year	Nominee / work	Award	Result
1999	Confessin' the Blues	Best Blues & Roots Album	Nominated

=== Music Victoria Awards ===
The Music Victoria Awards are an annual awards night celebrating Victorian music. They commenced in 2006.

Year	Nominee / work	Award	Result	Ref.
2014	4am	Best Blues Album	Nominated	
