= The Luxury of Hysteria =

The Luxury Of Hysteria

Studio album by Tim Rogers
- Released: 29 September 2007
- Genre: Alternative rock
- Label: Ruby Q
- Producer: Tim Rogers, Jimi Maroudas and Mel Robinson

Tim Rogers chronology
Dirty Ron/Ghost Songs (2005)	The Luxury Of Hysteria (2007)

The Luxury of Hysteria is the fourth studio album by the front man for Australian rock band You Am I, Tim Rogers, and his first to be credited solely to his name, although his backing band, The Temperance Union, did play on most tracks. The album was released on the 29 September 2007. The only single from the album, "When Yer Sad", was released to radio and TV. Rogers actually created his own record label, Ruby Q, specifically to release this album, so he could remain free from any creative control issues.

== Tour ==
The brief album launch tour in support of The Luxury of Hysteria began on 3 October 2007, and lasted for approximately 1 month. The performance consisted of a 4-piece orchestra set, The Temperance Union and Louis Macklin on the keys. The tour brought a different experience to what fans of Tim Rogers were used to. Each show was brought to auditoriums in a sit-down, intimate event that allowed the album to be enjoyed. The shows were accompanied by visuals projected behind the band.

== Track listing ==
1. "A Quiet Night in" – 5:00
2. "A Most Ordinary Set of Events" – 2:55
3. "When Yer Sad" – 4:51
4. "Wise Words" – 2:53
5. "You Absolutely Charming Man" – 3:24
6. "Goodnight Boys" – 3:50
7. "Jimmy's Delicate Condition" – 4:17
8. "Correspondence" – 3:34
9. "Things Gonna Get Ugly" – 2:54
10. "The Luxury of Hysteria" – 4:58
11. "James the Second" – 4:58

A second exclusive disc was available from JB Hi-Fi Online, consisting of five live tracks from the 'A Gentleman's Agreement' tour.

1. "You Absolutely Charming Man" (live)
2. "Correspondence" (live)
3. "Jimmy's Delicate Condition" (live)
4. "Paragon Cafe" (live)
5. "Get Drunk Call Your Friends" (live)

== Personnel ==
- Tim Rogers – guitar, vocals
- Shane O'Mara – lute, guitarsenal
- Ian Kitney – drums, percussion (both tuned and otherwise), stretched goatskin and bosophorus cymbals
- Peter Lawler – bass, throat manipulation, Hammond organ, Wooly mammoth horns
- Louis Macklin – piano
- Mel Robinson – vocals and cello
- Christina Katsimbardis, Rebecca Chan, James Munro – strings
- Jack Howard, Mickaela Mowat, David Mowat – horns

== Charts ==
Chart performance for The Luxury of Hysteria
Chart (2007)	Peak position
Australian Albums (ARIA)	41
