= Sacred Heart Mission =

Charitable organisation in Melbourne, Australia

Sacred Heart Mission in St Kilda, an inner suburb of Melbourne, is a medium-sized not-for-profit organisation that grew from the Catholic parish of The Sacred Heart in Grey Street, West St Kilda. It addresses homelessness, social exclusion and disadvantage by providing a range of diverse and creative services that:

- ensure people have access to necessities including housing, food and healthcare; and
- enable people to connect with their community and develop support networks that sustain and nurture their lives.

== History and beginnings ==
A researcher on social structure in St Kilda in 1979 commented that "there seems to be an above average concentration of isolated single men" often living in rooming houses. Even though such accommodation had been on the decline, there were still 4,298 rooming house beds across 247 rooming houses in St Kilda in 1978. Almost one-third of rooming houses across the inner-Melbourne city councils were in St Kilda and the unemployment rate was nearly 10% in 1981. Community services were hard pressed to meet existing demands. It was in this context that Sacred Heart Mission had its origins in early 1982. Then newly appointed parish priest, Fr Ernie Smith, offered a welcoming response to those who came to the presbytery door seeking food and shelter. Demand grew to such an extent that a volunteer roster was set up to serve food daily and the daily meal was moved from the small presbytery kitchen to the hall supper room. By 1984 a manager was appointed, other welfare activities supporting people who were homeless, isolated and disadvantaged were taking shape and Sacred Heart Mission was set up as a separate legal entity.

Fr Ernie was succeeded as parish priest in 1998 by Fr Terry Kean, and he in turn by Fr John Petrulis in 2007.

== The Mission in recent years ==
In 2015-2016 the Mission had a budget of $18.7m which is drawn from federal, state and local government funding, philanthropic, corporate and individual donations, fundraising events, bequests, grants, income from its clinic appointments and residential fees, and its op shops. The Mission employs 300 staff members and draws on the efforts of 1,200 individual volunteers. The work of the Mission encompasses a range of services and programs.

=== Meals program ===
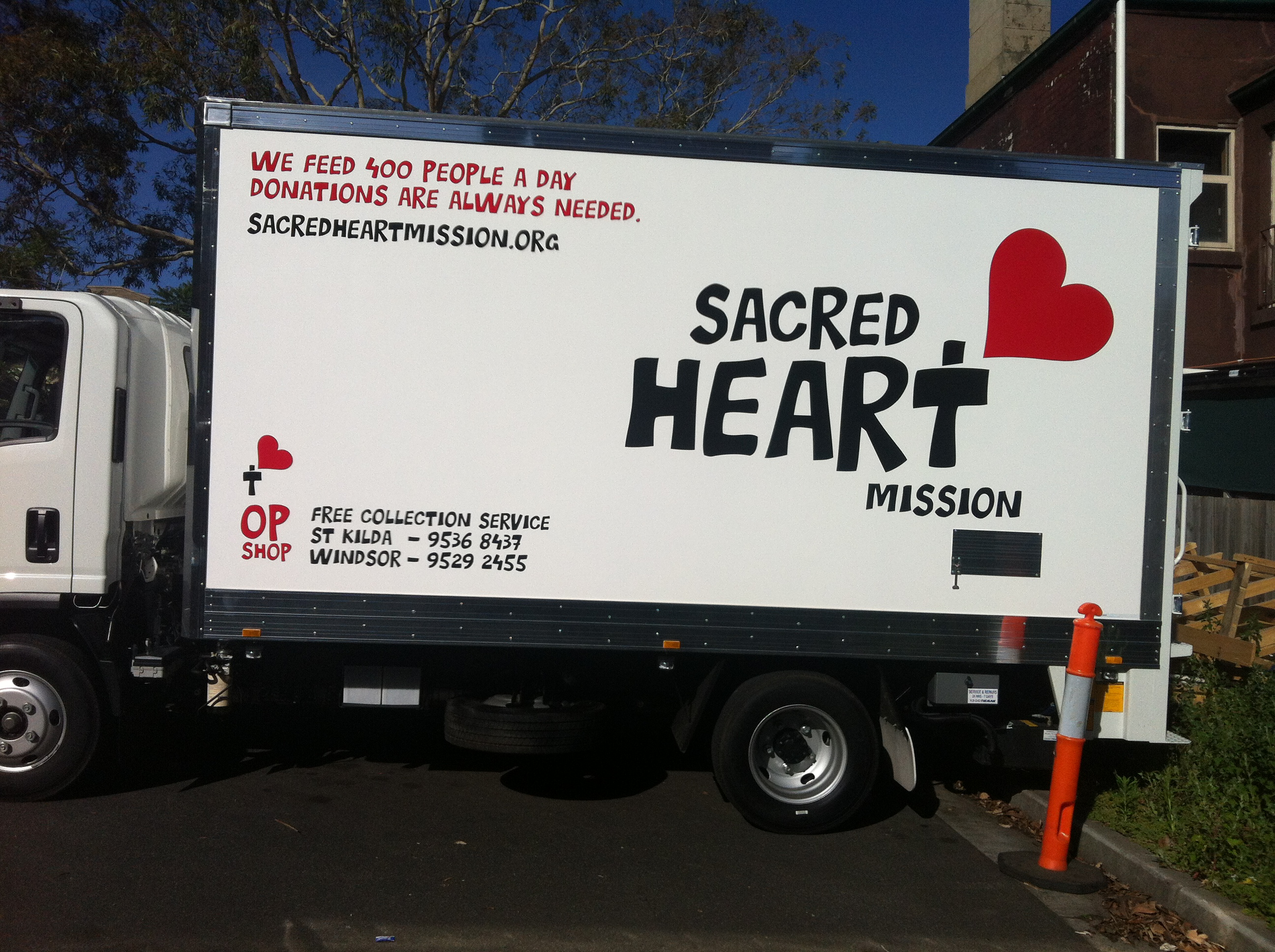
Sacred Heart Mission has a fleet of trucks that is used to pick up donations of food for its meals program and pre-loved items for its op shops.

Four paid kitchen staff, three trainee chefs and 25 rostered volunteers provide a nutritious three-course lunch daily for around 350 people. Everybody is welcome. People who are homeless or living in poverty also come by for breakfast and tea or coffee. Three support workers are present each day to engage with those who may need additional services offered by the Mission or other agencies. Much of the food is donated by markets and local businesses or sourced through food rescue organisations which retrieve edible produce otherwise headed for landfill.

Regular donors to the meals program include Junee Abattoirs, Davies Bakery, Dobsons potatoes, Monte Coffee/Bean Alliance, Susan Day cakes, Carmen's Muesli, Nuttelex and Lion (Milk). During his years at the Mission, Fr Ernie struck up a relationship with stallholders at the Footscray Wholesale Market (now in Epping) which continues today, with many donating fresh fruit and vegetables weekly. In addition, former commercial flower grower Les Baguley has since 1999 been donating to the meals program vegetables and herbs that he grows on his Heatherton farm.

Waste management company KS Environmental collects the leftover food scraps which are then turned into garden compost.

In January 2013 funding was announced for a $1.2 million renovation of the dining hall from where the meals are served. The money was raised by philanthropist Paula Fox, her family and friends, the State Government of Victoria and the Catholic Archdiocese.

=== Clinic ===
Sacred Heart Mission's clinic was the first in the Hands on Health network. This network assists communities to improve the delivery of health and other services to people who are marginalised, and today has projects across the Asia-Pacific. The Mission's clinic offers various of services and complementary therapies such as hairdressing, counselling, podiatry, acupuncture, naturopathy and Reiki, all conducted by volunteer practitioners.

=== Women's services ===
The Women's House in Robe St is an open access centre offering a safe place for women in need. Staff offer general case management, of usually 13 weeks, and intensive case management with the Women's Housing Complex Needs Program (WHCN), which is usually between six and 12 months. Staff members provide support and referrals for issues such as counselling, housing, drug and alcohol support and parenting. Women who use these programs often need support having experienced family violence. The Women's House open access operates from Monday to Friday, 11:30am – 3.00pm, providing women with a lunch, shower and laundry facilities. There is a sleeping room available for women to take a rest during opening hours. Health and wellbeing activities are also organised, such as ceramics and yoga classes, provided by volunteers.

The Outlandish program became part of Sacred Heart Mission in 2013, and offers eco-volunteering to women, to increase community participation. Examples of eco-volunteering could be working with (farm) animals, growing plants or doing marine research.

Bethlehem Community merged with Sacred Heart Mission in July 2015 and provides medium to long term accommodation to support homeless women in Victoria. This accommodation centre has facilities in Reservoir and Thomastown.

Homefront is a crisis accommodation centre where women over 25 can stay overnight. Homefront does not accommodate accompanying children. The average stay is six weeks, where women receive support and case management to work towards a more permanent housing plan. They also get help with issues such as family and sexual violence, physical and mental illness and alcohol and drug addictions.

=== Rooming house ===
As a response to the closure of rooming houses due to the gentrification of the area, in 2005 accommodation of 67 self-contained units in a former motor inn on nearby Queens Road was established in partnership with Community Housing Limited. The iconic building was designed by revered mid-century architect Robin Boyd and the Rolling Stones stayed in the motor inn in 1965. The building had been adapted a number of times before being turned into the rooming house.

The tenancies are for people with histories of homelessness and many have complex needs including dual diagnosis. Support workers are on hand, with some residents needing daily assistance to maintain good health and a stable tenancy. A social inclusion program seeks to engage residents in community activities and employment for those who show interest. An art studio encourages creative expression and a number of artist residents have shown their work at exhibitions.

=== Sacred Heart Community Residential Services ===
The two facilities provide accommodation for 83 residents, most of whom have experienced homelessness and social isolation. Sacred Heart Community provides an 'ageing in place' approach. People who choose to live at Sacred Heart Community have the option to live here for the rest of their lives. There is a 24-hour registered nurse and staff coverage in the facilities.

The comprehensive Lifestyle Program creates opportunities for residents to connect within the facilities and with the broader community. Many people have had long relationships with other services at Sacred Heart Mission and are supported to maintain these.

=== Sacred Heart Local ===
A team of staff and volunteers provide support to 75 elderly people living within the cities of Port Phillip, Stonnington and Glen Eira. They assist with activities such as shopping, transport, meal provision, cleaning and personal care to enable the residents to remain in their own homes.

=== Sports and recreation program ===
Trophies won by the Hearts footy team, displayed in Sacred Heart Mission's dining hall.

Participants can take part in active sports like swimming and basketball, cricket and football, as well as movies and excursions. Peter Cullen, then a seminarian, initiated the sports program in the early 1990s and ran it without funding for a number of years. These days the sporting teams from the Mission play in competitions organised by RecLink. The football team, The Hearts, draws enthusiastic support from the local community. Sacred Heart Mission is a charity partner of the St Kilda Football Club and players sometimes attend The Hearts' training sessions.

The Kick Start program is part of the sports program, meant for people to build the confidence to pursue sport activities in the wider community. It aims to help build the skills and knowledge to start practicing a sport, while addressing their physical and mental health, drug or alcohol use. Health or age related issues can create a barrier for sporting activities. Kick Start offers individualised, case management support, from learning about healthy diets to learning how to swim or join the gym.

=== Specialist Services ===
People with complex needs and mental health and/or drug and alcohol issues are offered case management and referred for secondary consultation.

=== Journey to Social Inclusion program ===
A pilot project that commenced in late 2009, J2SI provides one of the most in depth studies of long-term homelessness ever undertaken in Australia. Sacred Heart Mission developed the pilot in recognition that people who are long-term homeless are currently using expensive services yet their homelessness is not being addressed. J2SI provides three years of intense support for 40 people who are long-term homeless and aims to demonstrate that breaking the cycle of homeless has both social and economic benefits for the community. Funded from both philanthropic sources and government, this program relies on service partnerships with several health, welfare and social research agencies. The social aspects of the pilot are being evaluated by the Australian Housing and Research Institute at RMIT. The Melbourne Institute of Applied Economic and Social Research at The University of Melbourne is evaluating the economic impact. The evaluation was completed by RMIT researchers in 2014. With the results of this evaluation, Sacred Heart Mission started the second phase of the J2SI project, expanding it to more people and a wider geographical area.

=== Being with people until the end ===
A pastoral team of three, including the parish priest, extends companionship and spiritual support and comfort to people who, at the end of their life, may have no family at hand. From time to time "Mission people" are given a funeral service in the Grey Street church: some are buried at Emerald Cemetery or, more recently, at Bunurong Memorial Park near Dandenong.

== Fundraising ==
=== Events ===
Fundraising staff work with volunteer committees on a program of functions, some of which have become landmark events on the Melbourne calendar. Sacred Heart Mission generates enormous goodwill and this is evident in the events which receive both financial and gift-in-kind support from corporate organisations, businesses, foundations and individuals.

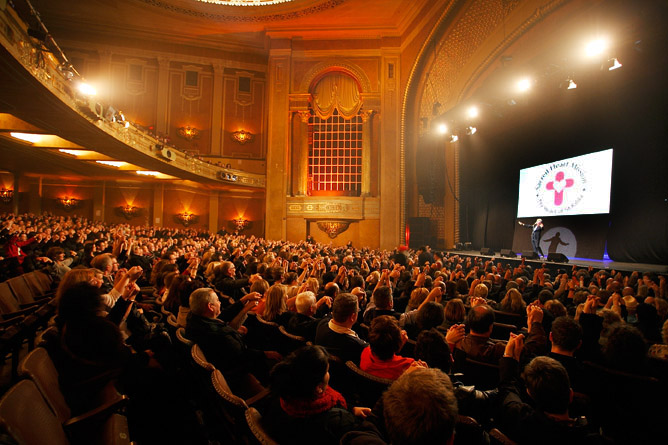
Heart of St Kilda Concert audience watches Brian Nankervis on stage at the Palais Theatre 2011.

The most attended event is the Heart of St Kilda Concert that has been held annually mid-year at the Palais Theatre, St Kilda since 2008. It is hosted by Brian Nankervis and some of the prominent Australian musicians and comedians who have performed pro bono include: Paul Kelly, Jon Stevens, Jimeoin, Des Dowling, Dan Sultan, Kate Ceberano, Dave Hughes, Adalita, Tex Perkins, Rebecca Barnard and Icehouse.The concert was the idea of a few people involved in The Community Cup, an Australian Rules football match played annually between two non-footballing communities (typically musicians and comedians). Sacred Heart Mission organised the event for 14 years before it became too big logistically.

Every May, Sacred Heart Mission holds its fundraising campaign DINE WITH HEART MONTH. First organised in 2014 as a gala dinner on the stage of St Kilda's iconic Palais Theatre, the event has expanded to a month-long collaboration with restaurants, bars and cafes all over Melbourne who help to raise money for the Mission's Meals Program, which provides up to 400 free meals daily. Every four dollars raised covers the cost of a meal for someone experiencing homelessness, social isolation or disadvantage. In 2016 the Dine with Heart event brought in $115,000, enough for 28,750 meals.

An intimate sporting-themed dinner “Dine with the Champions” takes place each year to raise money for Sacred Heart Mission's sports and recreation program. Athletes, sporting personalities and sports journalists such as Giaan Rooney, Rick Kelly, Michael Klim, Simon Gerrans, Angela Pippos, Peter Moody and Merv Hughes have been invited to be panellists and share their stories with guests. It has been held at a number of locations including the nearby historic Junction Oval. Dine with the Champions raised $65,000 in 2016 for Sacred Heart Mission's Kick Start program

Specific fundraising for the Mission's Women's House started in 1995 with a $100 dinner with 100 women at a private house to raise $10,000. This has evolved into the annual “Light Up a Life” cocktail party that in 2012 was held at The Prince Deck and attended by more than 350 people.

The Mission has also been involved with "Batting for the Battlers" over the years – a charity cricket match at the Peanut Farm Oval in St Kilda with celebrities competing in the teams Veg Out vs The Vineyard.

== Supporters ==
Sacred Heart Mission receives an enormous amount of support from all areas of the community. Star of the Sea, a Melbourne girls' school, has a long tradition of sending groups of students to volunteer in the Mission's dining hall as part of its community service program as well as undertaking fundraising activities for the Mission. Actress Rachel Griffiths began her association with the Mission when she was a student at Star of the Sea. In 2001 she asked friends to donate to the Mission in lieu of birthday gifts and later that year, at Christmas time, helped to distribute 400 hampers. She raised more than $30,000 for the Mission through selling photos of her wedding to the media. Her children were baptised at Sacred Heart Church.

A number of major corporations support the Mission financially and through volunteering, such as the National Australia Bank and Ernst & Young. Both organisations regularly send teams of staff members to volunteer as well as having workplace giving programs that support the Mission. They are also strong supporters of past events.

Local real estate agents Chisholm & Gamon have supported the Mission since 2005 as major sponsors of "Dine with the Champions", conducting the "rowdy auction" at this and other fundraising events and have also provided pro bono real estate boards advertising for events. In 2011 they began to promote the Mission's op shops to people who are moving in or out of properties which they have sold or manage.

== Volunteers ==
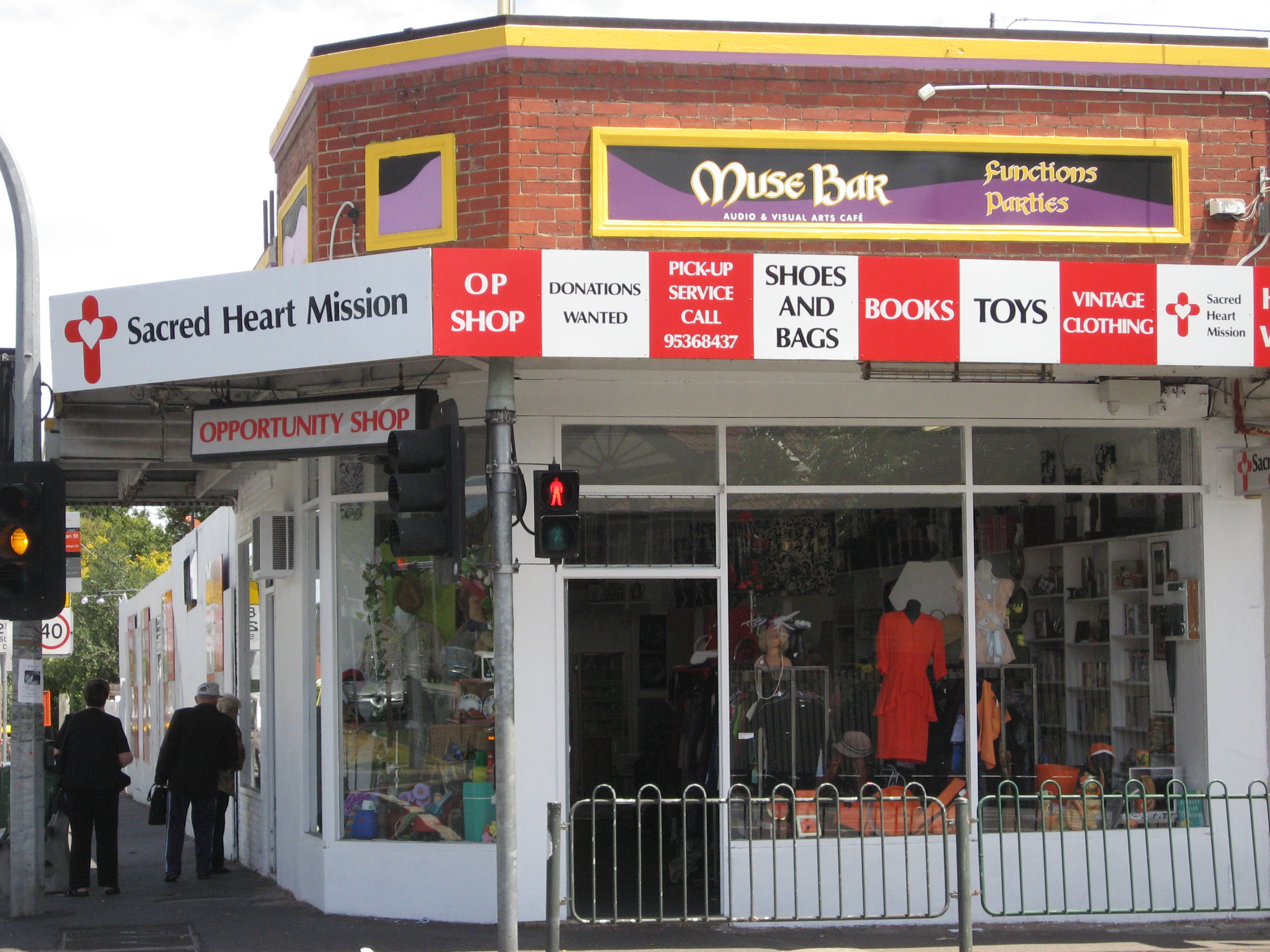
The exterior of the East St Kilda op shop.

Initially, the volunteers were those few who helped prepare meals round the presbytery kitchen table. Now two staff members induct and liaise with around 1,000 volunteers who work willingly alongside paid staff in many of the Mission's programs. The volunteers are most visible in the dining hall and op shops, but others offer expertise as practitioners and therapists at the clinic, accompany hostel residents on outings, visit the elderly, help out in the sports and recreation programs, assist in the women's house or help in administration. A number of businesses and schools send teams on a regular basis as a community service.

== Opportunity shops ==
Thirteen op shops sell donated goods and cater to people wanting to support the circular economy and buy second-hand items. Located in St Kilda, East St Kilda, South Melbourne, Prahran, Chapel Street, Bentleigh, Elsternwick, Fitzroy, Fitzroy North, Cheltenham, Northcote, Hawthorn, and Preston, the shops raise 30% of the funds needed to run the various programs Sacred Heart Mission provide to people experiencing homelessness in Melbourne. No two op shops look alike. The stores are also known for their events, in particular, the yearly Chapel Street event. In 2019, Sacred Heart Mission's Online Store was developed, selling second-hand goods online. One of the first op shops to develop a dedicated e-commerce platform, the store sells high-end and designer goods.
