= PBS 106.7FM =

PBS 106.7FM (3PBS)
- Melbourne, Australia; Australia
- Broadcast area: Melbourne RA1
- Frequencies: 106.7 MHz FM; DAB+: VHF block 9B
- Branding: PBS 106.7FM Melbourne

Programming
- Language: English
- Format: Specialist, contemporary and progressive music Community

Ownership
- Owner: Progressive Broadcasting Service Cooperative Ltd

History
- First air date: 21 December 1979; 46 years ago
- Former frequencies: 107.7 MHz FM (1979–1987)
- Call sign meaning: Progressive Broadcasting Service

Technical information
- ERP: 56 kW

Links
- Website: pbsfm.org.au

PBS 106.7FM (call sign: 3PBS), also known as the Progressive Broadcasting Service, is a cooperatively owned community radio station in Melbourne, Australia, that broadcasts on 106.7FM, digital radio, and online. PBS celebrated its 40th year of broadcast in 2019.

PBS is a specialist contemporary music radio station hosting approximately 80 programs per week. To maintain musical diversity, volunteering PBS announcers independently choose their content according to genre or theme. Volunteer efforts are both behind the scenes and on air.

The station dropped the "3" from its call sign before the turn of the century, preferring in the age of internet streaming and digital radio to be known as just PBS, PBS-FM, or PBS 106.7 FM.

The cooperative holds a Community class license and raises funds largely through paid annual membership. This is supplemented by on-air sponsorship, live music events and other activities relevant to the music community in Melbourne.

Shareholding members of the cooperative elect a board of directors that employs a station manager to be responsible for all aspects of the station's operations, encompassing more than 400 dedicated volunteers and a small team of professional staff.

Programming is determined by a committee chaired by a board member who oversees the process. The committee includes the Station Manager, Program Manager, and seven coordinators. They are tasked with choosing the announcers and programs.

In 2019, PBS 106.7FM was inducted into the Music Victoria Hall of Fame.

== History ==
In 1975, Royal Melbourne Institute of Technology (RMIT) student campus station 3ST applied to the Broadcasting Control Board for a restricted commercial AM license. The application by student campus stations was done under the name of the SRNA, with 3ST, 3CT (Caulfield Institute of Technology), 3MU (Monash University) and the newly formed 3SW (Swinburne University). The application was unsuccessful and the license went to 3CR.

In 1976 Felix Hofmann, who had no affiliation with any broadcasting radio station, called a meeting of interested parties to establish an FM radio station for "progressive music". It was not practical to hold this meeting at his parents' home in St Kilda East so it was held in Garry Page's lounge room at 1 Baldwin Street, Armadale. To publicise the meeting Felix Hofmann used a press story in "The Southern Cross" newspaper and an advertisement in "The Toorak Times" newspaper; while Garry Page, as a former member of 3ST extended personal invitations to other 3ST members such as John Maizels and Barry Bron, and posted notices at the 3CR and 3ST studios.

Given his knowledge of the industry and radio licensing process, the elected chairman was John Maizels, Technical Manager at 3ST (and son of noted broadcaster Monty Maizels) and co-host of the 'John and Paul Show' on 3ST (with Paul Cuthbert). Although not a member of 3CR, given his expertise, John Maizels was one of the announcers on 3CR's first test transmission from their Armadale station on 1 May 1976. Felix Hofmann was elected vice-chairman and ensured the vision of a progressive music service was not lost. Early active members also included Rosalie Brookes, Maria McGuane, Alan Quirk, Sally-Ann Rozario, David Stubbs, and Lee Traynor.

During this early period, enthusiasts who had an interest in microprocessors from Intel, Motorola, Signetics 2650, Fairchild F8, etc. were meeting at the Clayton campus of Monash University, Graham Thirkell's Optro premises and went on to form the Microcomputer Club of Melbourne (MICOM). Peter Jetson, who was to play a significant role in 3PBS plus MICOM, and Garry Page, a Broadcast Technical Officer employed by the Australian Broadcasting Commission (ABC) to perform studio maintenance, were both members of MICOM. Rosalie Brookes facilitated the meeting when the 'Progressive Broadcasting Service' name was adopted. Subsequently, membership cards were printed for the unincorporated 3PBS group with the first memberships to John Maizels, Felix Hofmann and Garry Page. For convenience, the initial 3PBS mailing address was a Post Office Box in Armadale.

As the initial meeting was about 400 meters from the 3CR radio station in High Street, Armadale there were a significant number of curious 3CR members in attendance. All names and addresses were recorded and used for initial mail-outs. As PBS would be a special interest music station and non-political the vast majority of 3CR members were not seen at subsequent meetings, did not pay memberships or become active members of 3PBS. Garry Page managed the membership records on his account on the Control Data Corporation (CDC) Cyber 6000 series mainframe computer system at St Kilda Road. The 3PBS membership records were later transferred by John Maizels to an IBM mainframe. Subsequently, the 3PBS postal address was moved from Armadale.

Soon after the 3PBS group was established meetings moved to John Maizels home in Port Melbourne. 3PBS membership was drawn from ABC, 3ST, unaffiliated public and some 3CR members. It is a myth that 3PBS was an early splinter group of 3CR headed by John Maizels. Caroline Kardachi and Ken Fargher played significant roles in the establishment of the station. For example, the group registered as the Progressive Broadcasting Service Co-operative Limited at a meeting at Ken Fargher's upstairs room, Peel Street, North Melbourne.

3PBS test transmissions from a low power FM transmitter located on the BHP Building, corner of Bourke and William Streets in the Melbourne CBD occurred from a studio at John Maizels' Port Melbourne home in 1977 and 1978. Reception reports were received from listeners throughout Melbourne's extended metropolitan area. In August 1978 the station was successful in its application to the Australian Broadcasting Authority for a license and subsequently began a series of short broadcasts from temporary studios. The fledgling station started to make regular broadcasts to inner Melbourne in the early 1980s on 107.7 MHz from its studios at the Prince of Wales Hotel and a 200W transmitter on the old Royal Women's Hospital site in Carlton. The first programme was presented by David Stubbs at 4:30pm on 21 December 1979, and the first track broadcast was I'll Be Gone (Someday I'll Have Money) by Spectrum. David Stubbs selection of I'll Be Gone was significant for Melbourne radio as it had been the final rock track played on the formerly top rating, commercial station 3AK 3AK#1970s-1980s when it had changed from a Rock/Pop format. Initially, PBS-FM's broadcast hours were restricted to exclude daytime on weekdays with Melbourne University claiming interference from the nearby transmitter.

The station moved from the Prince of Wales Hotel in St Kilda up Acland Street to the Park Lake building in 1985. From there it began broadcasting 24 hours a day to greater Melbourne in late 1987, only becoming possible with the transmitter relocating to Mt. Dandenong on the new frequency of 106.7 MHz. The official frequency changeover took place on 16 November 1987.

In 2001 the station moved again, this time to 47 Easey Street Collingwood with the first transmission from the new premises on 27 November 2001. It was announced in 2018 that PBS was going to relocate as the first tenant announced for Collingwood Yards, the redevelopment of the former Collingwood Technical School site in Johnston Street. A fundraising campaign was held to support the relocation with the station fully moved to the new studios in Collingwood Yards in February 2022.

In 2019, PBS published a 212-page book to celebrate the 40th year of broadcasting.

== Magazine ==
Separate from internal newsletters (Ripples and Unreal News), PBS has produced several magazines for financial members and the public during its history. The first was Waves from 1977 until it was discontinued in March 1988. Static emerged as a short-lived replacement in 1989, of which there were only three issues leading up to the station's 10th Anniversary; Issue Minus 3 (July 1989), Minus 2 (Oct 1989) and Minus 1 (Dec 1989). Largely for financial reasons, there was hiatus until late 2002 when a single issue of Over Easey appeared. Subsequently, this was renamed Easey magazine in 2003, initially published every three months. Easey magazine is still the official PBS print magazine, and is now posted out to all PBS Members twice a year.

== Awards ==
=== Music Victoria Awards ===
The Music Victoria Awards are an annual awards night celebrating Victorian music. They commenced in 2005.

Year	Nominee / work	Award	Result
2019	PBS 106.7FM	Hall of Fame	inductee

=== Mick Geyer Award ===
Mick Geyer was a broadcaster and journalist in the alternative Melbourne music scene in the 1980s and 1990s. His influence was widespread, but remained largely outside the public view. In honour of his legacy as a fierce campaigner for the role of alternative and community radio (and PBS in particular), this occasional award was introduced by PBS in 2012 to acknowledge enormous contributions to the station and its community.

The recipients to date are; Peter Merrett (2012), Mike Glover (2013), David Heard (2014), Helen Jennings (2015), John Carver (2016), Jan Dale (2017), Maddy MacFarlane (2018), Pierre Baroni (2019).

== See also ==
- Community Cup
