= What Rhymes with Cars and Girls =

Studio album by Tim Rogers
- Released: 3 March 1999
- Genre: Country, folk
- Label: Ra Records/BMG
- Producer: Jen Anderson

Tim Rogers chronology
What Rhymes with Cars and Girls (1999)	Spit Polish (2004)

What Rhymes with Cars and Girls is the debut studio album by You Am I frontman Tim Rogers, and also the name of the stage musical created by Rogers and playwright Aidan Fennessy in 2015.

The album was recorded at Jen Anderson's (of Weddings Parties Anything) home studio, and featured many varied musicians, including Sally Dastey of Tiddas (on "Up-A-Ways").

At the ARIA Music Awards of 1999, Rogers won Best Male Artist for this release.

== Reception ==
Trouser Press said the album "filters American country, folk and bluegrass through his Australian perspective. The largely acoustic instrumentation includes upright bass, trombone, clarinet, banjo and accordion. The laid-back arrangements lend an air of humility to another sterling set of Rogers compositions."

== Singles ==
"You've Been So Good to Me So Far" and "I Left My Heart All Over the Place" were released as a double-sided radio single.

== Track listing ==
1. "Bushell and a Peck" – 2:08
2. "You've Been So Good to Me So Far" – 4:40
3. "I Left My Heart All Over the Place" – 4:11
4. "You Just Don't Do It for Me, Friend" – 3:36
5. "Arse Kickin' Lady from the Northwest" – 2:56
6. "Happy Anniversary" – 3:51
7. "Twenty Eight" – 3:28
8. "Under the Flight Path" – 3:10
9. "Up-A-Ways" – 3:16
10. "Hi, We're the Support Band" – 2:47
11. "The Songs They Played as I Drove Away" – 4:45

All songs were written by Rogers. "Arse Kickin' Lady from the Northwest" and "Under the Flight Path" both appeared previously as You Am I songs on the "Rumble" single, with the former also appearing as the first track on the live ...Saturday Night, 'Round Ten album.

== Personnel ==
- Tim Rogers – vocals, guitar, keyboards
- Jen Anderson – violin, viola, harmonium, omnichord
- Stuart Speed – upright bass
- Ian Kitney – drums and percussion
- Mark Wallace – accordion
- Ed Bates – pedal steel
- Peter Somerville – banjo
- Richard Gillard – electric guitar
- Ben Hoddanger – trombone
- Andy Reid – clarinet and washboard
- Jeff Burston – mandolin
- Sally Dastey – vocals (on "Up-A-Ways"), brandy
- David Lane – guitar

== Charts ==
Chart performance for What Rhymes with Cars & Girls
Chart (1999)	Peak position
Australian Albums (ARIA)	14

== Musical ==
In 2015, the album was adapted for the stage, with playwright Aidan Fennessy working with Rogers to create a new musical, What Rhymes with Cars and Girls, for the Melbourne Theatre Company.

=== Awards ===
The musical was nominated for a Helpmann Award for Best New Australian Work in 2015.
