= Dirty Ron/Ghost Songs =

Studio album by Tim Rogers
- Released: 5 September 2005
- Genre: Alternative rock
- Label: Festival Records

Tim Rogers chronology
Spit Polish (2004)	Dirty Ron/Ghost Songs (2005)	My Better Half (2006)

Dirty Ron/Ghost Songs is a double album by Tim Rogers and the Temperance Union. The album was released on 5 September 2005 as a double album and peaked at number 48 on the ARIA Albums Chart.

== Singles ==
"Do It Again" was released as a radio single. All tracks written by Tim Rogers with exception of 'Simple Things' by Tim Rogers/Ian Kitney.

== Track listing ==
Dirty Ron

1. "Do It Again" – 4:09
2. "My Brother's Room" – 3:12
3. "I's Rather Be Krund" – 3:53
4. "Rats" – 2:16
5. "Kickin' Stones" – 3:58
6. "Shit" – 2:29
7. "Kalgoorlie" – 4:09
8. "Simple Things" – 2:53
9. "Who You Settin' Your House Up For?" – 3:33
10. "The Singer-Songwriter Blues" – 3:36

Ghost Songs

1. "Dumb" – 2:12
2. "Wild One" – 4:42
3. "Obviously" – 3:57
4. "Ghost Songs" – 4:14
5. "Broken Stuff" – 3:07
6. "Ridin' Between My Place and Ours" – 3:26
7. "Social Pages" – 3:18
8. "Paperboy" – 4:14
9. "Tonight" – 6:00

== Personnel ==
- Tim Rogers – guitar, vocals
- Shane O'Mara – guitar
- Ian Kitney – drums, percussion
- Stuart Speed – bass guitar
- Donna Simpson – vocals ("Tonight"), backing vocals (Broken Stuff)
- Rebecca Barnard – backing vocals (I's Rather Be Krund, Social Pages)
- Missy Higgins – backing vocals (Ghost Songs, Paperboy)

== Charts ==
Chart performance for Dirty Ron/Ghost Songs
Chart (2005)	Peak position
Australian Albums (ARIA)	48
