= Tim Rogers (musician) =

Australian musician and actor

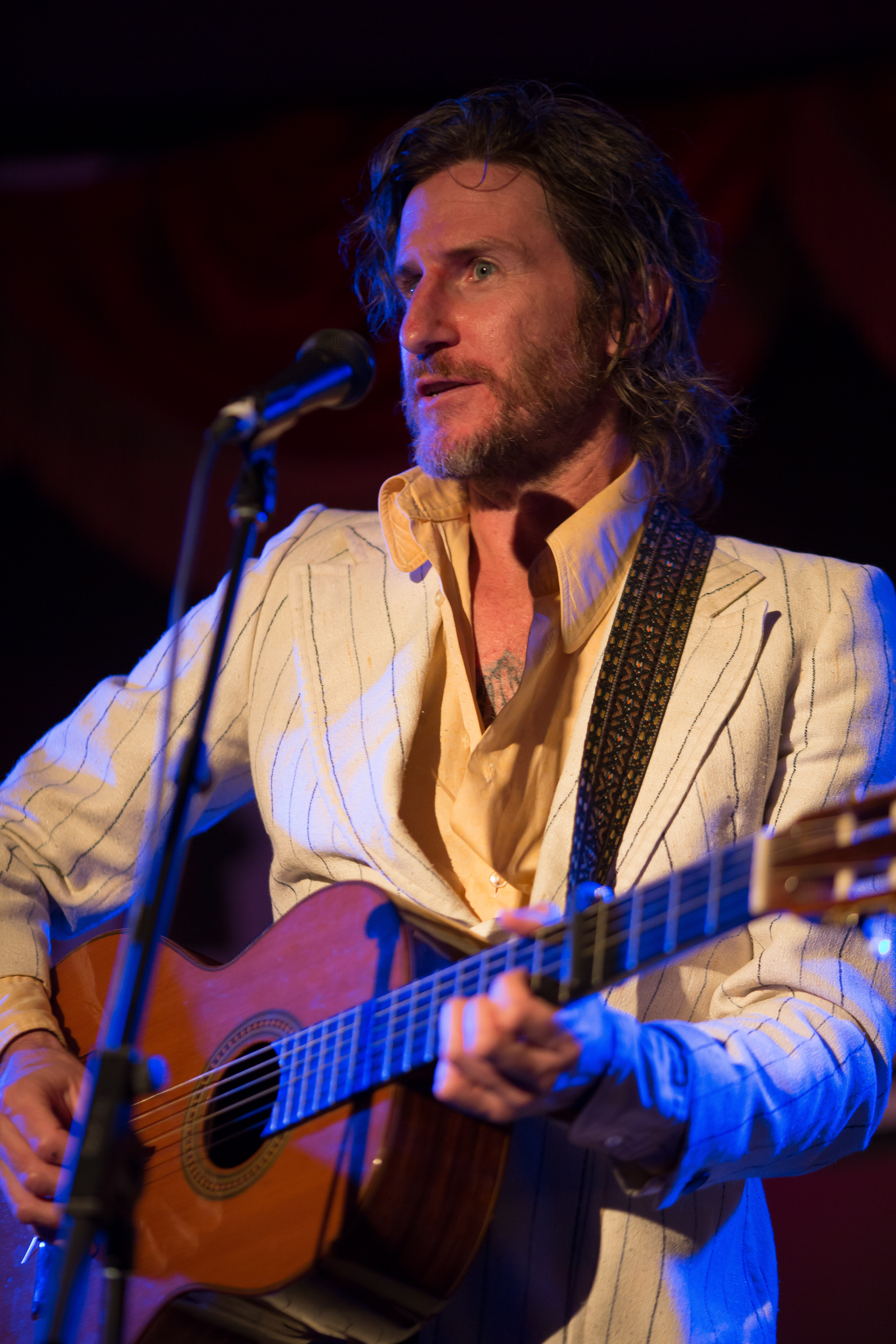
- Rogers in 2014

Background information
- Born: Timothy Adrian Rogers; Kalgoorlie, Western Australia, Australia
- Genres: Rock, country
- Occupations: Musician, songwriter, actor, writer
- Instruments: Guitar, vocals
- Years active: 1989–present
- Label: FOUR FOUR
- Member of: You Am I, Hard-Ons, The Ferguson Rogers Process
- Formerly of: TnT, Tim Rogers & The Temperance Union, Tim Rogers & The Twin Set
- Website: tim-rogers.com.au youami.com.au

Timothy Adrian Rogers (born 20 September 1969) is an Australian musician and actor, most notable as the frontman of the rock band You Am I. He has also recorded solo albums with backing bands. As of July 2013, Rogers has released 12 albums with You Am I and five solo albums.

== Early life ==
Born in Kalgoorlie, Western Australia, Rogers moved between towns multiple times during his adolescence, including Adelaide and Canberra. Following his primary school years in Applecross, a suburb of Perth, Rogers later became school captain at Sydney school Oakhill College. Rogers studied law at the Australian National University in Canberra, aged 18, though did not complete a degree. While at ANU, Rogers lived at Toad Hall residential accommodation, and worked part-time at Canberra Theatre. During this time, Rogers met Andy Kent, who later became the long-term bass player of You Am I.

== Career ==
=== Music ===
==== Box the Jesuit ====
The first band that Rogers joined which performed in front of crowds was Box the Jesuit, of which he was a member for roughly a dozen shows. Rogers later referred to Goose (real name: Stephen Gray) from Box the Jesuit as his 'mentor', with Rogers later writing the song "Paragon Cafe" about his experience travelling along the Hume Highway to attend Goose's funeral in 1993.

==== 1989–present; You Am I ====
Rogers formed You Am I with school friend Nick Tischler and older brother Jaimme Rogers in 1989. Although the line-up regularly changed during the band's early period, Andy Kent and Mark Tunaley eventually settled on bass guitar and drums, respectively. Kent had previously been the band's sound mixer before joining as a musician. After the recording of their debut album Sound As Ever Tunaley was asked to leave the band and Russell 'Rusty' Hopkinson joined. Second guitarist Davey Lane, initially part of The Twin Set touring band, joined in 1999.

==== 1999–present: Solo career ====
Rogers released his first solo album What Rhymes with Cars and Girls in 1999 after his relocation to Melbourne. Rogers later provided a brief background for an album that was recorded over a three-week period on an eight-track digital recorder: "I had some time alone and I found myself writing some songs and then I just thought, well it looks like You Am I's not going to be recording for a while, while we're waiting for albums to come out overseas, so I wanna make a record…" Recorded at the home studio of Weddings Parties Anything band member Jen Anderson, the album mostly consists of country/folk-style songs, even though Rogers hesitated at the idea of a country sound. Rogers used the name The Twin Set for his backing band, as well as for the corresponding tour. He later won an ARIA award for Best Male Artist for the album.

In late 2004, Rogers wrote a jingle called "Our Time Begins Again Today" for the Australian Cricket Board's summer promotional campaign "Long Live The Weekend". Rogers was the face of the Australian Football League (AFL)'s 2012 finals series, starring in a television commercial and print advertising campaign. The advertisements, featuring the slogan "This Is Greatness", consist of Rogers recounting some of the greatest final moments in AFL history.

On 29 September 2007, Rogers released his fourth solo album The Luxury of Hysteria, the first album for which his name is the sole performing credit, although The Temperance Union performed on the album. Rogers also created his own record label, Ruby Q, to release the album.

Writing for The Age newspaper, Michael Dwyer wrote in an October 2007, saying "Tim Rogers never sounded as lost as on this strange, beautiful album .... The first three songs are troubled inner monologues. A Quiet Night in and When Yer Sad infuse the act of being alone with Shakespearean gravity. Much of the rest is like personal correspondence, written late at night when feelings are raw and references obscure. There's no mistaking the mood, though: regret and bewilderment bounce off each other like booze and smokes." Australian music writer Ed Nimmervoll described The Luxury of Hysteria as: "Reflective, brutally honest and painful- but never self indulgent …"

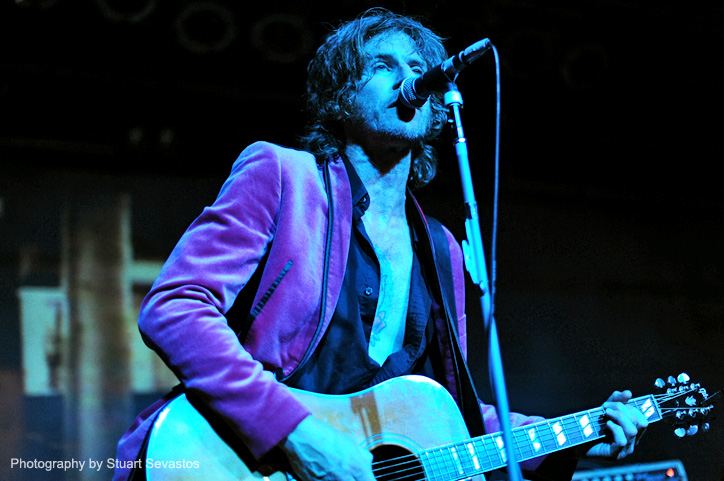
Rogers, 2010

Ten years after the release of What Rhymes With Cars and Girls, Rogers, together with musicians from the original recording sessions, played several live performances in the Australian cities of Sydney and Melbourne during April 2009 for a limited tour that involved the album played live in its entirety. The concerts lacked Stuart Speed, the album's bass guitarist, who had died. Anderson reflected upon the album's significance prior to the commencement of the shows, "Moving to Melbourne for him [Rogers] was a fresh start. He didn't choose to talk about it [the relationship] and I didn’t bring it up. It was a healing, moving on process for him. And it was best to leave it at that—let him work through what was going on in his life and introduce him to some new musical buddies in Melbourne."

For Rogers's fifth solo album, his second without a backing band, he signed with FOUR FOUR, an imprint of ABC Music. Entitled Rogers Sings Rogerstein, the album was released on 24 August 2012 and was produced by long-time collaborator Shane O'Mara. The album's title refers to Shel Rogerstein, an American whom Rogers met on a train in Southern France. Rogers revealed in 2013 that Rogerstein does not appear on the Google search engine and is averse to touring. In the corresponding press release for the album's launch, Rogers wrote, "Quite where the percentages lie in lyrical/musical contributions on this album is unclear ... Shel claims he's as baffled as to his contributions as I am to mine. Subjects are close to my bones, but as our lives within this loose ramble have become so confluent, quite who's leaning on whose shoulder is unclear."

Rogers won the Double J Australian Artist of the Year award in 2015.

In October 2022, Rogers announced the forthcoming release of Tines of Stars Unfurled, scheduled for release in February 2023.

==== Influences ====
Tim Rogers regards Keith Richards (The Rolling Stones), Pete Townshend (The Who) and Paul Westerberg (The Replacements) as his three formative musical heroes, becoming aware of each of those artists as a teenager. Throughout his career, Rogers eventually supported all three of these heroes as a musician: You Am I supported The Rolling Stones in 2003, The Who in 2004, and The Replacements in 2015.

Rogers regards Paul Westerberg as his favourite songwriter, The Replacements as his favourite band, and regards Bring the Family (1987) by John Hiatt as his favourite album, although he has listed other albums in similar lists at other times.

==== Side projects ====
The initial release of You Am I's fifth album Dress Me Slowly also contained a bonus disc entitled The Temperance Union EP that consisted of eight songs Rogers had recorded and written, mostly in solo format. He later used the name of the EP, based loosely on that of the Woman's Christian Temperance Union, to name his backing band for two subsequent albums, starting with Spit Polish in 2004. The release of the second Temperance Union recording, a double album entitled Dirty Ron/Ghost Songs, occurred in 2005, and the recording features various special guests such as Missy Higgins, Donna Simpson and Rebecca Barnard.

In 2006, Rogers collaborated with long-time friend Tex Perkins to form T'N'T, eventually releasing the album My Better Half, a collection of acoustic originals and cover versions. The album received mixed reviews for its minimal production values and "tongue-in-cheek" covers, such as Rod Stewart's "Tonight's the Night".

In August 2021, it was announced that Rogers had become the Hard-Ons' new lead singer. Rogers first album with the band, I'm Sorry Sir, That Riff's Been Taken, was released in October 2021.

=== Film ===
Along with a You Am I cameo appearance in the film Dirty Deeds, Rogers has made various forays into acting. His first acting experience was a small cameo role in Jane Campion's Holy Smoke!, while his television acting debut was released on 28 July 2005, an episode of ABC TV's medical drama series MDA in which Rogers played Joel Palmer, a rock star who donates a kidney to a daughter he did not know he had fathered. Rogers also acted in the Michael Weisler short film Hunter Finkelstein that was shown at the 2005 Melbourne International Film Festival.

In January 2013, Rogers and Australian musician Megan Washington worked as actors on the musical/thriller film The Boy Castaways. Filmed in Adelaide, Australia, the film was directed by Michael Kantor, who also directed the 2009 theatre production Woyzeck (in which Rogers also starred). Filming took three weeks and the premiere occurred at the Adelaide Film Festival in October 2013. In 2013, Rogers also played Glendle in the film Tracks directed by John Curran, alongside actors Mia Wasikowska and Adam Driver.

Rogers features in the music video of the Reels' "Quasimodo's Dream", produced by Sandpit, to coincide with the theatrical release of The Boy Castaways in late 2013.

=== Theatre ===
In February 2009, Rogers made his professional stage debut at the Malthouse Theatre as the Entertainer in its production of Woyzeck, a play directed by Kantour, with music composed by Nick Cave and Warren Ellis.

In 2012, Rogers composed the score for Marion Potts' production of Federico García Lorca's Blood Wedding at the Malthouse Theatre. During the production's run in August 2012, Rogers described the score as "impressionistic" in a media interview and revealed that his initial method involved producing large pieces of music and then discarding 95 percent of it: "If it's not needed to have music there, or complementary, just leave it out. So at times we have sounds emanating from the stage that are only vaguely tonal."

In 2012, Rogers also acted in and composed the music for The Story of Mary MacLane by Herself, by Ride on Theatre's Bojana Novakovic (script adaptation) and Tanya Goldberg (director). Rogers performed original compositions for the play, accompanied by musicians Dan Witton and Andy Baylor. Sydney's Griffin Theatre production occurred in early 2012, while the Melbourne season was held at the Beckett Theatre of the Malthouse Theatre complex during November and December.

In 2015, Rogers took his album What Rhymes with Cars and Girls to the stage with the Melbourne Theatre Company. The musical's script was adapted by Aidan Fennessy, while Rogers was musical director. Actors Sophie Ross and Johnny Carr performed in the show, which was nominated for a Helpmann Award for Best New Australian Work in 2015.

In 2019, Rogers brought his radio show Liquid Lunch (Double J) onto the stage along with broadcaster Jon Von Goes and sound designer Russell Goldsmith.

=== Television ===
Rogers has frequently appeared as a television guest on programs such as RocKwiz, Rove Live, Talkin' 'bout Your Generation, The Fat and Hard Quiz. He appeared as himself in the second season of The Micallef Program and in the "Be a Rock Star" episode of Lawrence Leung's Choose Your Own Adventure, and also appeared in several episodes of the ABC television series MDA as a rock musician. Rogers' interview on Andrew Denton's Enough Rope coincided with the September 2008 launch of You Am I's eighth studio album Dilettantes.

In 2013, Rogers hosted the music performance/interview show Studio at the Memo during July and August. Guests on the show included Martha Wainwright, Tex Perkins, Kate Miller-Heidke, Bernard Fanning and Don Walker. The six-part series was produced by the Renegade company that also produces SBS Television's RocKwiz series. Writing for the Australian news outlet, Graeme Blundell concluded his review with the following sentiment:

There's no one else like him on TV and this show, like RocKwiz, should run for decades, especially as Foxtel has allocated a multi-million-dollar fund to record local performance. Rogers is seriously cool, in the sense that the word means calm, stoic, intriguing and impressive, and suggests reserved confidence, a self-conscious aplomb in behaviour that distances itself from authority rather than directly confronts it. A way of fitting in while standing out, maybe.

=== Radio ===
Rogers presents the Liquid Lunch program on Double J digital radio each Friday afternoon (repeated Saturday afternoon)

=== Writing ===
Rogers has written for Australian publication The Monthly on two occasions: a review of Don Walker's musical memoir Shots from March 2009, and a small non-fiction piece in December 2010. Rogers also wrote the cover feature article of the inaugural edition of the Australian bicycle magazine Treadlie in 2010, in which he covers topics such as baskets, songwriting and cycling outfits: "Just as I festoon myself in full North Melbourne kit circa 1975 to challenge both my hamstrings and mid-life plight at footy training of a Wednesday and Sunday, so shall my treadling brethren furnish themselves for celerity." Rogers published his literary memoir titled "Detours" in 2017.

== Personal life ==
Rogers has a daughter. He was married to Rocio Garcia Rodriguez, his daughter's mother, between 1999 and the early 2010s. They met in Madrid, Spain, and later lived together in Melbourne. Rodriguez worked as a Spanish philosophy teacher, and was the founding director of Melbourne's La Mirada Film Festival. In August 2012 Rogers reflected on their divorce by explaining, "To my great shame I took my marriage for granted."

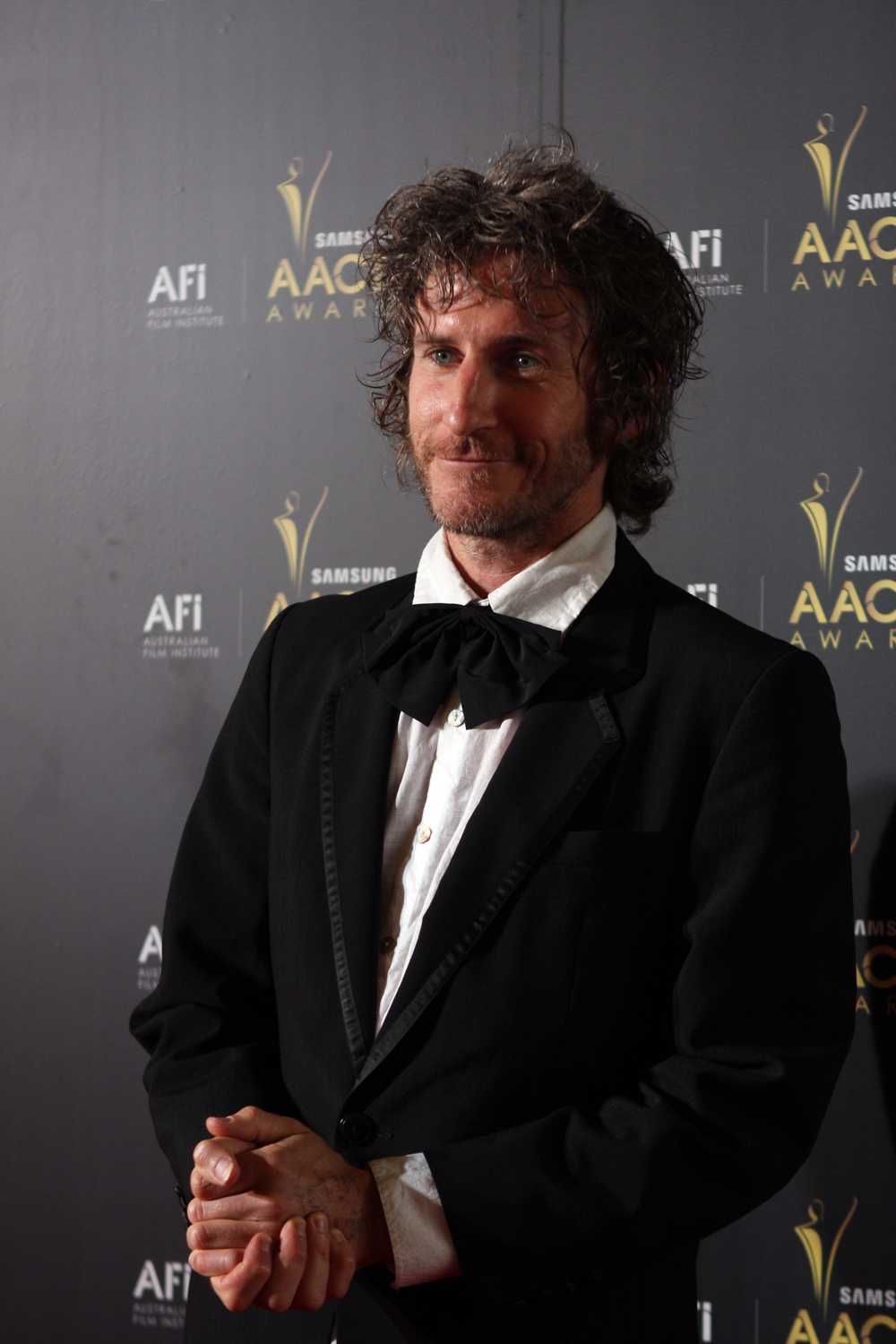
Rogers, January 2012

Rogers draws income from various artistic projects such as music, soundtrack composition and acting, as well as other ventures like gardening.

Rogers experienced mental health issues such as anxiety during his twenties, including panic attacks. He chose to openly disclose this information from the 2000s onwards, to help others experiencing similar symptoms. Rogers revealed in 2012 that he is much happier at the age of 42 years than he was in his mid-twenties:

I'm far more excited about anything currently, I'm enjoying more, I've read more, I've seen more. No nostalgia at all. A couple of good records … that I heard. Did some great travelling, but I travel better now, I was really sort of medicined up. I didn't enjoy touring as much, we were doing some touring through Europe and the States and I enjoy doing those tours more now. I enjoy everything about touring and being in the band more now. I don't think back on it anything less than fondly, but I'm so much happier at 42 than I was at 26.

Rogers has also been involved in relationships with Australian musician Megan Washington and Serbian-Australian actor Bojana Novakovic. In an August 2012 interview, Rogers revealed that a significant number of his relationships were broken due to attention from the press.

Rogers' 2017 memoir Detours detailed his late 2010s relationship with a woman he referred to as "The Hurricane". Rogers named this partner as Rosemary in interviews surrounding the book.

An avid sports fan since childhood, Rogers enjoys the game of Australian rules football, and played in the 2005 and 2009 Community Cup charity matches for Melbourne, Australia's Sacred Heart Mission charitable organisation. Rogers is a supporter of the North Melbourne Football Club, joined in the resistance against the AFL's effort to relocate the club to the Gold Coast, Queensland and recorded a cover version of the team's theme song 'Join in the chorus'. As part of the protest against efforts to relocate the club, Rogers hosted the "Roo-sistence" benefit concert that featured You Am I, T'N'T and other popular Australian rock bands.

Rogers has been an avid Sturt Football Club supporter (in the SANFL) since about the age of five. He was made the official club ambassador in 2015, and attends games when possible.

Rogers has lived in the Melbourne seaside suburb of St Kilda since 1999, and has referred to the "crepuscular ambience of St Kilda". In late 2012, Rogers briefly explained his perspective of St Kilda:

Winter is particularly great … Backpacker culture isn't as obvious, so you tend to see folks you haven't seen for the rest of the year all clamouring for hot toddies. I was away for two months doing theatre in Sydney and was then in the States for two months. It's pretty good when you come home from a trip that's been rather eventful and if you're really excited to be home.

In 2024, Rogers' partner was Alice Topp, a ballet dancer-turned-choreographer whom he met in 2010.

=== Controversy ===
In 2003, a drunken Rogers taunted Australian Idol judge Mark Holden in an Adelaide airport terminal. He claimed that You Am I were told to "make way" by their record label for new Idol winners. A physical altercation ensued and both parties were reprimanded by airport authorities.

At the 2004 Falls Festival, in Marion Bay, Tasmania, You Am I were one of the headline bands. However, Rogers apologised midway through the band's performance and walked off the stage. Guitarist Davey Lane tried to stop Rogers, but the lead singer became aggressive and continued on his way. Newspaper The Age reported:

Rogers threw his guitar onto the stage mid-song, saying he couldn't continue, and stormed off, pushing another band member who also walked off-stage looking upset ... Rogers also was involved in an incident backstage with singer Missy Higgins which left her visibly upset ... But Higgins recovered and joined Melbourne band The Beautiful Girls on stage to entertain the crowd when Rogers stopped playing.

== Discography ==
=== Studio albums ===
List of studio albums, with selected chart positions
Title	Album details	Peak chart positions
Title	Album details	AUS
What Rhymes with Cars and Girls	Released: March 1999; Label: Ra Records, BMG Entertainment; Format: CD	14
Spit Polish (with The Temperance Union)	Released: April 2004; Label: Festival Mushroom Records; Format: CD	52
Dirty Ron/Ghost Songs (with The Temperance Union)	Released: 2005; Label: Festival Mushroom Records; Format: CD	48
The Luxury of Hysteria	Released: October 2007; Label: Ruby Q Records; Format: CD	41
Rogers Sings Rogerstein	Released: August 2012; Label: ABC Music, Four Four Music, Universal Music; Format: CD	45
The Rules of Attraction (with The Bamboos)	Released: May 2015; Label: Atlantic; Format: CD, LP, download	26
An Actor Repairs	Released: May 2017; Label: ABC Music, Four Four Music; Format: CD, LP, download	30
Tines of Stars Unfurled (with The Twin Set)	Released: 24 February 2023; Label: Virgin Music, Universal Music; Format: CD, LP, download	4

=== Collaborative albums ===
List of collaborative albums, with selected chart positions
Title	Album details	Peak chart positions
Title	Album details	AUS
My Better Half (with Tex Perkins as TnT)	Released: August 2006; Label: Liberation Music; Format: CD	31

=== Movie soundtracks ===
- Idiot Box (1999)
- Dirty Deeds (2002)
- Wish You Were Here

== Awards and nominations ==
=== APRA Awards ===
The APRA Awards are presented annually from 1982 by the Australasian Performing Right Association (APRA), "honouring composers and songwriters".

Year	Nominee / work	Award	Result	Ref.
2018	"Youth"	Song of the Year	Shortlisted	
2022	"The Waterboy" by You Am I (Tim Rogers)	Most Performed Rock Work	Nominated	
2022	"The Waterboy" by You Am I (Tim Rogers)	Song of the Year	Shortlisted	
2024	"Been So Good, Been So Far" by Tim Rogers & The Twin Set	Most Performed Blues & Roots Work	Nominated	

=== ARIA Music Awards ===
The ARIA Music Awards is an annual awards ceremony that recognises excellence, innovation, and achievement across all genres of Australian music. They commenced in 1987.

Year	Nominee / work	Award	Result	Ref.
1999	What Rhymes with Cars and Girls	Best Adult Alternative Album	Nominated	
1999	What Rhymes with Cars and Girls	Best Male Artist	Won	

=== EG Awards / Music Victoria Awards ===
The EG Awards (known as Music Victoria Awards since 2013) are an annual awards night celebrating Victorian music. They commenced in 2006.

Year	Nominee / work	Award	Result	Ref.
2012	The Bamboos featuring Tim Rogers – "I Got Burned"	Best Song	Nominated	
2012	Tim Rogers	Best Male	Won	
2017	Tim Rogers	Best Male	Nominated	

=== J Awards ===
The J Awards are an annual series of Australian music awards that were established by the Australian Broadcasting Corporation's youth-focused radio station Triple J. They commenced in 2005.

Year	Nominee / work	Award	Result
2015	Tim Rogers	Double J Artist of the Year	Won

=== Helpmann Awards ===
The Helpmann Awards is an awards show, celebrating live entertainment and performing arts in Australia, presented by industry group Live Performance Australia since 2001. Note: 2020 and 2021 were cancelled due to the COVID-19 pandemic.

Year	Nominee / work	Award	Result	Ref.
2015	What Rhymes with Cars and Girls (with Aidan Fennessy)	Best New Australian Work	Nominated	
2015	What Rhymes with Cars and Girls	Best Music Direction	Nominated	
2015	What Rhymes with Cars and Girls	Best Original Score	Nominated	
