= Rebecca's Empire =

Australian indie pop-rock band

- Origin: Melbourne, Victoria, Australia
- Genres: Alternative rock; rock; pop
- Years active: 1994–2000
- Labels: Eternity/Polydor; Festival
- Past members: Rebecca Barnard; Shane O'Mara; Peter Luscombe; Bill McDonald; Michael den Elzen

Rebecca's Empire (also written as the variant Rebeccas Empire) were an Australian indie pop-rock band formed in 1994. Their mainstay members were Rebecca Barnard on lead vocals and her then-domestic partner, Shane O'Mara on lead guitar. They released two full-length albums, Way of All Things (1996) and Welcome (1999) before disbanding in 2000.

== History ==
=== 1989–2000: Career ===
In 1989 Rebecca Barnard, a singer-songwriter, and her then-domestic partner, Shane O'Mara on lead guitar, recorded a cover version of TISM's track, "The Judeo-Christian Ethic", which was released on that group's 1991 single, "Let's Form a Company" (see Hot Dogma). Barnard and O'Mara had worked together (since 1986) and separately in various groups and as session or backing musicians for other artists.

Rebecca's Empire was based around Barnard and O'Mara, which formed in 1994 in Melbourne as a rock, pop duo. They recorded a cover version of Pearl Jam's "Alive" for an album by Performers Releasing Information about Clean Syringes (P.R.I.C.S.), Do It Safe (1994). P.R.I.C.S. was a government project for AIDS prevention and education.

The band signed with Polydor's newly created Eternity label and the duo were expanded to a four-piece by the addition of Peter Luscombe on drums (ex-Stephen Cummings Band, Black Sorrows) and Bill McDonald on bass guitar (ex-Hot Half Hour, Deborah Conway Band). This line-up released their debut single, "Atomic Electric", as a four-track extended play, late in 1994. "Atomic Electric" was an indie success, which was listed at No. 38 on the 1994 Triple J Hottest 100 listeners poll.

Early in 1995 Michael den Elzen on bass guitar replaced McDonald, who joined Frente!. Their label released another four-track EP in June of that year with remixed and re-recorded versions of "Atomic Electric" together with "Red Dress" and "Wasting Time" from the first EP. In September they followed with a six-track EP, Take a Look at Happiness, which included the tracks, "Empty" and "Alive". "Empty" was listed at No. 62 on the 1995 Triple J Hottest 100.

The band's breakthrough occurred in July 1996, when their first full-length album, Way of All Things, was released to relative critical acclaim. It was produced by O'Mara. Australian musicologist, Ian McFarlane, opined, "[it] was brimming with quality songs like the ballads 'In Deep' and 'Talking Star', tough rockers like 'Way of All Things' (with its funky Lenny Kravitz-styled riff), 'So Rude' and 'Atomic Electric', plus two sterling slices of Badfinger-style guitar-pop, 'Empty' and 'Mirage'." Jonathan Lewis of AllMusic rated it at four-out-of-five stars and explained, "an example of melodic power pop, similar to both Belly's Star, though without the quirkiness, and Teenage Fanclub's Grand Prix, though more influenced by Led Zeppelin than by The Byrds. Infectious, well-written guitar pop songs were the order of the day and few bands do these as well."

The album was successful in indie circles, and had some minor success on the mainstream charts. It provided three singles, "In Deep", "So Rude" and "Way of All Things". "So Rude" was listed at No. 57 on the 1996 Triple J Hottest 100; while "Way of All Things" polled at No. 94 in the 1997 list.

Way of All Things was followed by a two-year relative hiatus, although they played some concerts in this time. They released a three-track CD single, "Car Radio", in November 1997, which was only available from concerts. In mid-1998 den Elzen left to join deadstar and was replaced by McDonald returning.

In October 1998 Rebecca's Empire issued a single, "Medicine Man", which preceded their second album, Welcome (August 1999) via Festival Records. Again, it was produced by O'Mara. It provided two more singles, "Big Smoke" (April 1999) and "Bad Blood" (July). Welcome was not as well received by critics as their earlier efforts. Although, McFarlane observed, "the three year wait had been worth it; it was another slice of pop perfection." Despite the band's profile, none of its singles made the Hottest 100 that year. The album and its accompanying singles were their last releases as they announced their break-up in June 2000.

=== 2000–present: Post-disbandment ===
In April 2006 Barnard released her debut solo album, Fortified, via Shock Records, which was co-produced by Barnard and O'Mara. Both returned to session and backing work.

After a period of nearly twenty years of being out-of-print, Rebecca's Empire first album was released on streaming platforms in April 2020, with Brian Parker from YourMusicRadar opining that Way of All Things "has now reemerged not only as a great Australian album, but also a case study of a band that could have been a lot more popular".

On 12 November 2022, Barnard performed her cover of "The Judeo-Christian Ethic" at the Croxton Bandroom in the Melbourne suburb of Thornbury, shortly before TISM took to the stage for the first time in eighteen years.

== Members ==
- Rebecca Barnard – lead vocals, guitar (1994–2000)
- Shane O'Mara – lead guitar (1994–2000)
- Peter Luscombe – drums (1994–2000)
- Bill McDonald – bass guitar (1994, 1998–2000)
- Michael den Elzen – bass guitar (1995–1998)

== Discography ==
=== Studio albums ===
List of studio albums, with selected details and chart positions
Title	Details	Peak chart positions
Title	Details	AUS
Way of All Things	Released: July 1996; Label: Eternity, Polydor (527 980-2); Format: CD	75
Welcome	Released: August 1999; Label: Festival (D24132); Format: CD	102

=== Extended plays ===
List of extended plays, with selected details and chart positions
Title	Details	Peak chart positions
Title	Details	AUS
Atomic Electric	Released: December 1994; Label: Eternity, Polydor (579 313 2); Format: CD	126
Rebecca's Empire	Released: 1995; Label: Eternity, Polydor (8533932); Format: CD	—
Take a Look at Happiness	Released: 1996; Label: Eternity, Polydor (579 601 2); Format: CD	—

=== Charting singles ===
List of charting singles, to top 200, with selected chart positions
Title	Year	Chart positions
Title	Year	AUS
"Empty"	1995	190
"In Deep"	1996	117
"So Rude"	1996	125
"Way of All Things"	1997	142
"Medicine Man"	1998	188
"Big Smoke"	1999	200
"Bad Blood"	1999	197

== Awards and nominations ==
=== ARIA Music Awards ===
The ARIA Music Awards is an annual awards ceremony that recognises excellence, innovation, and achievement across all genres of Australian music. They commenced in 1987.

Year	Nominee / work	Award	Result	Ref.
1997	Way of All Things	Breakthrough Artist - Album	Nominated	
