= The Whitlams discography =

Band discography

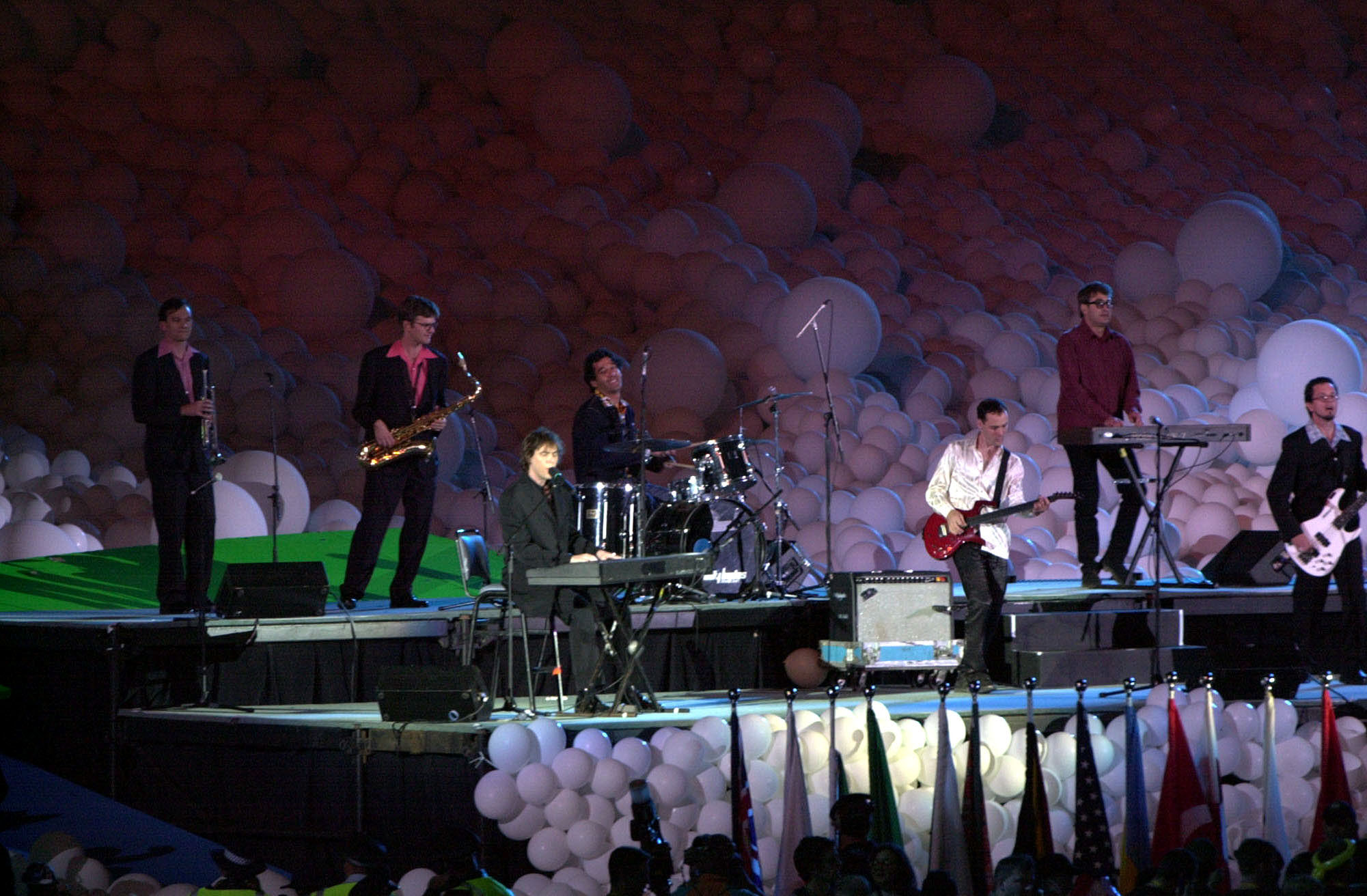
- The Whitlams performing at the closing of the 2000 Sydney Paralympics
- Studio albums: 8
- Live albums: 2
- Compilation albums: 1
- Singles: 24

The discography of Australian rock band the Whitlams, consists of eight studio albums, two live albums, one compilation album, and twenty-four singles.

Since 2021, the Whitlams have recorded as the Whitlams BlackStump Band and released Kookaburra in March 2024, which acts as the group's eighth studio album.

== Albums ==
=== Studio albums ===
List of studio albums, with selected chart positions and certifications
Title	Album details	Peak chart positions	Certifications (sales thresholds)
Title	Album details	AUS	Certifications (sales thresholds)
Introducing the Whitlams	Released: August 1993; Label: Phantom (PHMCD-27); Format: CD	—	
Undeniably the Whitlams	Released: February 1995; Label: Black Yak/Phantom (BYO-A1); Format: CD	167	
Eternal Nightcap	Released: 18 March 1997; Label: Black Yak/Phantom (BY0-A7); Format: CD	14	ARIA: 2× Platinum
Love This City	Released: 1 November 1999; Label: Black Yak/Warner (3984297282); Format: CD	3	ARIA: 2× Platinum
Torch the Moon	Released: 22 July 2002; Label: Black Yak/Warner (09274589362); Format: CD	1	ARIA: Platinum
Little Cloud	Released: 19 March 2006; Label: Black Yak/Warner (5101118432); Format: CD	4	ARIA: Gold
Sancho	Released: 28 January 2022; Label: EGR (EGR009); Format: CD, vinyl, digital	21	
Kookaburra (as the Whitlams Black Stump)	Released: 8 March 2024; Label: EGR (EGR015); Format: CD, vinyl, digital	54	
"—" denotes a release that did not chart or was not issued in that region.

=== Live albums ===
List of live albums
Title	Album details
Stupor Ego	Released: August 1996; Label: Black Yak (BY0-E4); Format: CD
The Whitlams & The Sydney Symphony Live in Concert	Released: June 2008; Label: Black Yak; Format: promotional CD

=== Compilation albums ===
List of compilation albums, with selected chart positions and certifications
Title	Album details	Peak chart positions	Certifications (sales thresholds)
Title	Album details	AUS	Certifications (sales thresholds)
Truth, Beauty and a Picture of You	Released: 2 August 2008; Label: Black Yak/Warner (5144288042); Format: CD, CD+DVD	3	ARIA: Gold

=== Video albums ===
List of video albums, with selected chart positions and certifications
Title	Album details	Peak chart positions	Certifications (sales thresholds)
Title	Album details	AUS DVD	Certifications (sales thresholds)
The Whitlams Years 1992–2004	Released: 13 September 2004; Label: Warner (5046749142); Format: 2× DVD	8	ARIA: Gold

== Singles ==
List of singles, with selected chart positions
Title	Year	Peak chart positions		Album
Title	Year	AUS	NZL	Album
"I Make Hamburgers"	1995	130	—	Undeniably the Whitlams
"Met My Match"	1995	—	—	Undeniably the Whitlams
"You Sound Like Louis Burdett"	1997	—	—	Eternal Nightcap
"No Aphrodisiac"	1997	59	47	Eternal Nightcap
"Melbourne"	1998	70	—	Eternal Nightcap
"Thank You (for Loving Me at My Worst)"	2000	63	—	Love This City
"Blow Up the Pokies"	2000	21	—	Love This City
"Made Me Hard"	2000	75	—	Love This City
"Fall for You"	2002	21	—	Torch the Moon
"Best Work"	2002	35	—	Torch the Moon
"Royal in the Afternoon"	2003	66	—	Torch the Moon
"Don't Believe Anymore"	2003	47	—	Torch the Moon
"Beautiful as You"	2007	40	—	Little Cloud
"Ballad of Bertie Kidd"	2020	—	—	Sancho
"Man About a Dog"	2021	—	—	Sancho
"(You're Making Me Feel Like I'm) 50 Again"	2021	—	—	Sancho
"50 Again" (as the Whitlams Black Stump)	2021	—	—	Kookaburra
"Cambridge Three"	2021	—	—	Sancho
"Nobody Knows I Love You"	2022	—	—	Sancho
"The Day John Sattler Broke His Jaw" (as the Whitlams Black Stump)	2022	—	—	Kookaburra
"Kate Kelly" (as the Whitlams Black Stump featuring Felicity Urquhart)	2023	—	—	Non-album single
"No Aphrodisiac" (as the Whitlams Black Stump)	2023	—	—	Kookaburra
"Man About a Dog" (as the Whitlams Black Stump)	2023	—	—	Kookaburra
"You Sound Like Louis Burdett" (as the Whitlams Black Stump)	2024	—	—	Kookaburra
"—" denotes releases that did not chart.

== Videography ==
=== Music videos ===
Year	Title
1993	"Woody"
1993	"Gough"
1995	"Following My Own Tracks"
1998	"No Aphrodisiac"
1998	"Melbourne"
1999	"Chunky Chunky Air Guitar"
1999	"Thank You (for Loving Me at My Worst)"
2000	"Blow Up the Pokies"
2001	"Made Me Hard"
2001	"I Will Not Go Quietly (Duffy's Song)"
2002	"Fall for You"
2002	"Best Work"
2003	"Royal in the Afternoon"
2003	"Don't Believe Anymore"
2006	"I Was Alive"
2006	"Fondness Makes the Heart Grow Absent"
2020	"The Ballad of Bertie Kidd"
2021	"(You're Making Me Feel Like I'm) 50 Again"
2022	"The Day John Sattler Broke His Jaw"
