= Truth, Beauty and a Picture of You =

Greatest hits album by The Whitlams
- Released: August 2, 2008
- Genres: Rock, pop, piano rock
- Label: Black Yak / Warner Music

The Whitlams chronology
Live in Concert (2008)	Truth, Beauty and a Picture of You (2008)	Sancho (2022)

Alternative Covers
- Pre-release cover

Truth, Beauty and a Picture of You is the first greatest hits album by Australian rock band The Whitlams. It was released in August 2008 and peaked at number 3 on the ARIA charts. Upon release, Tim Freedman said, "I decided to leave a couple of singles off, because I wanted to tell a story of The Whitlams in song, and I needed to put a couple of early tunes in there, and a couple of songs which were about the dramas that the band lived through, and I tried to make a nice mix between the popular songs and those that are an emotional journey."

A two disc deluxe edition includes a bonus DVD with documentaries on the making of the Love This City and Torch the Moon albums, and footage of their concerts at the Sydney Opera House in 2007 with the Sydney Symphony Orchestra. An article in The Age promoted the album's release, discussing the orchestrally-reworked Whitlams songs, the highs and lows of the band, and Freedman's young daughter Alice.

== Track listing ==
No.	Title	Writer(s)	Length
1.	"Blow Up the Pokies" (from Love This City)	Tim Freedman	3:25
2.	"Buy Now Pay Later" (from Eternal Nightcap)	Freedman	3:45
3.	"Fondness Makes the Heart Grow Absent" (from Little Cloud)	Freedman	3:58
4.	"No Aphrodisiac" (from Eternal Nightcap)	Freedman	4:22
5.	"Beauty in Me" (from Little Cloud)	Freedman	3:06
6.	"Fall For You" (from Torch the Moon)	Freedman	3:49
7.	"Thank You (for Loving Me at My Worst)" (from Love This City)	Freedman	4:12
8.	"You Sound Like Louis Burdett" (from Eternal Nightcap)	Freedman	4:01
9.	"I Will Not Go Quietly" (from Torch the Moon)	Freedman	3:51
10.	"I Make Hamburgers" (from Undeniably)	Freedman	3:36
11.	"Gough" (from Introducing)	Freedman	3:17
12.	"Following My Own Tracks" (from Undeniably)	Stevie Plunder	3:31
13.	"Shining" (from Undeniably)	Plunder	4:23
14.	"Royal in the Afternoon" (from Torch the Moon)	Freedman	2:58
15.	"Melbourne" (from Eternal Nightcap)	Freedman	4:19
16.	"The Road is Lost" (featuring Torcha and the Queensland Orchestra)		3:43
17.	"Keep the Light On" (Live with the Sydney Symphony Orchestra)	Freedman	3:54
18.	"The Curse Stops Here" (Live with the Sydney Symphony Orchestra)	Freedman	3:37
19.	"Out the Back" (from Torch the Moon)	Freedman	4:30
20.	"There's No-one" (from Love This City)	Freedman	5:05

=== Bonus DVD ===
Includes videos from The Whitlams Years DVD and footage from the Whitlams & SSO concerts.

- The Stories Behind the songs interview with Tim Freedman - 19:25
- Making of Love This City Doco (from the whitlam years DVD) - 15:57
- Making of Torch The Moon Doco (from the whitlam years DVD) - 7:02
- Where Is She from the Byron Bay Festival 1995 (from the whitlam years DVD) - 4:15
- Live Performance of "Fondness Makes The Heart Grow Absent" (with SSO) - 4:18
- Live Performance of "Ease of the Midnight Visit" (with SSO) - 4:57

== Charts ==
=== Weekly charts ===
Weekly chart performance for Truth, Beauty and a Picture of You
Chart (2008)	Peak position
Australian Albums (ARIA)	3

=== Year-end charts ===
Year-end chart performance for Truth, Beauty and a Picture of You
Chart (2008)	Position
Australian Albums (ARIA)	84

== Certifications ==
Region	Certification	Certified units/sales
Australia (ARIA)	Gold	35,000^{^}
^{^} Shipments figures based on certification alone.
