= Kookaburra (album) =

Studio album by the Whitlams Black Stump
- Released: 8 March 2024
- Recorded: May 2021 and August 2023
- Studios: Sony (East Sydney); Rancom St (Botany); The Music Cellar (Central Coast); Oceanic (Brookvale); Wilder (Gowrie Park)
- Length: 48:29
- Label: EGR
- Producers: Matt Fell; Rod McCormack

The Whitlams Black Stump chronology
Sancho (2022)	Kookaburra (2024)

Singles from Sancho
- 1. "50 Again" Released: 13 August 2021; 2. "The Day John Sattler Broke His Jaw" Released: 22 April 2022; 3. "Blow Up the Pokies (Black Stump)" Released: 28 October 2022; 4. "No Aphrodisiac (Black Stump)" Released: 28 July 2023; 5. "Man About a Dog" Released: 15 December 2023; 6. "You Sound Like Louis Burdett" Released: 25 January 2024

Kookaburra is the eighth studio album by Australian band the Whitlams, and first under the name the Whitlams Black Stump. It was released on 8 March 2024. The album was supported by the 25-date Kookaburra tour, commencing in March 2024. In May 2024, the tour was extended by an extra 20 days.

About making a country album, lead singer Tim Freedman said "I am a parochial lyric writer, and country music has a strong sense of time and place, so clothing my stories in a country music coat seemed like a natural progression to me, I had to scratch that itch and investigate."

At the AIR Awards of 2025, the album was nominated for Best Independent Country Album or EP.

== Reception ==
In an album review on Sunburnt Country, Sophie Hamley acknowledged the risk the group took by re-recording their songs into a different style. Hamley said "What is also profoundly clear – in a way that it wasn’t on the earlier recordings – is that Freedman is a really lovely singer." Hamley closed the review saying, "This is an album made by experts and the listener is rewarded accordingly. Freedman's high-stakes gamble has paid off, and old fans will no doubt mingle with new as he takes these songs to people all over the land."

== Track listing ==
1. "Man About a Dog" (Tim Freedman) – 4:07
2. "No Aphrodisiac" (Freedman, Glen Dormand, Matt Ford) – 2:59
3. "Fallen Leaves" (Perry Keyes, Matt Fell, Freedman) – 3:44
4. "In the Last Life" (Freedman, Wayne Connolly) – 4:39
5. "The Day John Sattler Broke His Jaw" (Keyes) – 4:47
6. "You Sound Like Louis Burdett" (Freedman, Mark Wells) – 4:14
7. "Your Boyfriend's Back in Town" (Bernie Hayes) – 3:23
8. "Nobody Wants to Be You" (Dan Reeder) – 2:06
9. "There's No One" (Freedman) – 3:35
10. "Blow Up the Pokies" (Freedman, Greta Gertler Gold) – 3:43
11. "50 Again" (Freedman, Daniel Denholm, John Housden) – 3:21
12. "Witness Protection Scheme" (Freedman, Chris Abrahams) – 2:57
13. "Birds" (Neil Young) – 4:54

== Personnel ==
The Whitlams Black Stump

- Tim Freedman – vocals, piano
- Ollie Thorpe – pedal steel guitars, electric guitars, backing vocals
- Rod McCormack – banjo, acoustic guitars, backing vocals, additional engineering (all tracks); production (track 1)
- Matt Fell – bass, percussion, ukulele, additional acoustic guitars, additional electric guitars, additional keyboards, backing vocals, production, mixing
- Terepai Richmond – drums, percussion

Additional musicians

- Stu Hunter – Hammond organ, piano (tracks 3, 5–13)
- Josh Schuberth – drums, percussion (tracks 1, 3, 5, 7–11, 13)
- George Washingmachine – violin (tracks 1, 2)
- Melanie Jackson – backing vocals (tracks 3, 8–10, 12, 13)
- Daniel Denholm – string arrangement, conductor (track 3)
- Michele O'Young – string leader (track 3)

Technical

- William Bowden – mastering
- Dan Frizza – engineering
- Adrian Breakspear – engineering (tracks 1, 3, 5, 7–11, 13)
- Ted Howard – additional engineering

Visuals

- David Frazer – lino print
- Cate Pepper – album art, design
- Cherrie Hughes – inside cover photo

== Charts ==
Chart performance for Kookaburra
Chart (2024)	Peak position
Australian Albums (ARIA)	54
