= Every Tuesday Sometimes Sunday =

Studio album by Bernie Hayes
- Released: October 1999
- Recorded: 1999
- Label: Half a Cow

Bernie Hayes chronology
Every Tuesday Sometimes Sunday (1999)	Domestic Departures (2003)

Singles from Every Tuesday Sometimes Sunday
- 1. "Mission in Life"; 2. "Matchbox Cars and Marbles"; 3. "Your Boyfriend's Back in Town"

Every Tuesday Sometimes Sunday is the debut solo album by Australian singer-songwriter, Bernie Hayes, which was issued in October 1999. Three of its tracks were released as singles, "Mission in Life", "Matchbox Cars and Marbles" and "Your Boyfriend's Back in Town". "Mission in Life" received wide airplay on national youth radio, Triple J. Every Tuesday Sometimes Sunday is an acoustically based album and included songs written by Hayes over his musical career.

The Whitlams recorded a version of Hayes' track, "You Made Me Hard" (see "Made Me Hard"), on that group's double platinum album, Love This City, in November 1999. It was released as its third single in 2001. Hayes used to play a version of the song with his brother Anthony Hayes a.k.a. Stevie Plunder (1963–1996), who had been a founding member of the Whitlams.

== Track listing ==
1. "Falling Over Backwards"
2. "Speak Memory Speak"
3. "Matchbox Cars and Marbles"
4. "You Made Me Hard"
5. "Your Boyfriend's Back in Town"
6. "Last Time"
7. "Mission in Life"
8. "South Perth"
9. "Slumber"
10. "Casting Couch"
11. "Test the Water"
12. "Kibonki"
13. "You Don't Even Know My Name"
14. "Lullaby"
