= Bernie Hayes =

Australian singer/songwriter

Bernie Hayes is an Australian singer/songwriter who has released four albums as a solo artist and written songs for other Australian artists notably "You Made Me Hard" which was the third single from The Whitlams Love This City album.

Hayes was born and raised in Canberra and was a member of a musical family (including brothers Pat Hayes of Stella One Eleven and formerly of the Falling Joys, Justin Hayes of Whopping Big Naughty and the late Anthony Hayes (aka Stevie Plunder) of The Whitlams and The Plunderers fame). He began playing around the wine bars of Canberra at age 15, and among his first bands was Secret Seven. Hayes later relocated to Sydney along with a number of other Canberra musicians, including his brothers.

He first came to public prominence when he joined Club Hoy in 1990. He played on that bands Thursday's Fortune album released in 1991 which enjoyed a positive critical response and minor chart success. Grant McLennan of The Go-Betweens produced the band's first single "Da Da Da Da/Green and Blue". Club Hoy later played on one of McLennan's solo albums. (1) After the break-up of Club Hoy, Hayes and Julia Richardson of Club Hoy formed a new group called the Troublemakers. However the Troublemakers failed to enjoy much success. (2)

Hayes is perhaps best known among fans, however, as a member of The Shout Brothers (aka The Shouties) with brothers Anthony and Pat and drummer Pete Velzen. The band held a Sunday afternoon residency at the Sandringham Hotel in Newtown, Sydney through the 1980s until 1996, playing a mix of covers and original songs. They released two albums: Colossus and Indelible.

In 1996, Hayes' younger brother Anthony, of The Whitlams, committed suicide. Bernie Hayes played guitar on The Whitlams Eternal Nightcap released later in 1997. (3)

Hayes released his first solo album, Every Tuesday, Sometimes Sunday, in late 1999. The album was acoustic-based and included material that he had written since the beginning of his musical career. (4) The album featured several singles, "Mission in Life", "Matchbox Cars and Marbles" and "Your Boyfriend's Back in Town", with "Mission in Life" receiving airplay on Triple J. (5) The Whitlams recorded a track from the album "You Made Me Hard" on their 1999 Love This City album. It was released as the third single from the album in 2001 with Hayes present in the studio for the recording of the single. (6) The Whitlams later recorded a cover of "Your Boyfriend's Back in Town" as part of their 2024 Kookaburra album, the debut album for The Whitlams Black Stump.

After the release of his solo album, Hayes put together a band, the Bernie Hayes Quartet, featuring John Encarnacao, Bill Gibson and Jess Ciampa. He played with his band and solo on the ABC Television program Love Is a Four Letter Word in 2001. He released his second album, Domestic Departures, in 2003 with the band. Genevieve Maynard and Peter O'Doherty of Mental As Anything produced the album while Nic Dalton, formerly of The Lemonheads, produced the first single, "Your Green Light". (7)

More recently, Hayes has worked with Bow Campbell of Front End Loader and Brendan Gallagher of Karma County as the Dead Marines.

His third album, Homebody, was released in 2007 and was followed in 2015 by Slow Fix.

Bernie is a long time member of Australian band Dog Trumpet, headed by Reg Mombassa and Peter O'Doherty, founding members of the ARIA Hall of Fame band Mental as Anything.

== Discography ==
- Every Tuesday Sometimes Sunday 1999
- Domestic Departures 2003
- Homebody 2007
- Lucky Dip (B Side Collection - iTunes) 2007
- Slow Fix 2015
