= Royal in the Afternoon =

Single by The Whitlams

from the album Torch the Moon
- Released: February 2003
- Recorded: 2002
- Genre: Piano rock
- Length: 2:58
- Label: Black Yak / Phantom
- Songwriter: Tim Freedman

The Whitlams singles chronology
"Best Work" (2002)	"Royal in the Afternoon" (2003)	"Don't Believe Anymore" (2003)

"Royal in the Afternoon" is a song by Australian band, The Whitlams. It was released in February 2003 as the third single from their fifth studio album, Torch the Moon. It received moderate success, peaking at number 66 in Australia in February 2003..

The song on Sunrise on 1 August 2008 to promote their latest release Truth, Beauty and a Picture of You.

== Reception ==
The Guardian described the song as, "A blokey rock song about leaving behind the life of a hellraiser for domestic bliss. Freedman sounds as if he is having fun as 'the mad king of it all', while Jak Housden provides the bouncy guitar." The Sydney Morning Herald agreed the song was "bouncy" and said it was "sure to be a live singalong favourite".

== Track listing ==
1. "Royal in the Afternoon" – 2:58
2. "Buy Now, Pay Later" (live) – 4:55
3. "Met My Match" (live) – 4:34
4. "No Aphrodisiac" (live) – 6:01
5. "I Make Hamburgers" (live) – 3:55

== Charts ==
Chart performance for "Royal in the Afternoon"
Chart (2003)	Peak position
Australia (ARIA)	66
