= Jak Housden =

- Born: John Paul Housden; 12 June 1969 (age 57); Sydney, New South Wales, Australia
- Genre: Rock
- Occupation: Musician
- Instrument: Guitar
- Years active: 1986–present
- Label: Boffin
- Website: jakhousden.com

John Paul "Jak" Housden (born 12 June 1969) is an Australian guitarist, singer, and composer. Best known as a long-standing member of the Whitlams, he is also a founding member of the Badloves, appearing on all their classic 1990s releases. A regular session guitarist, Housden has performed and recorded with Barry Gibb, Olivia Newton-John, Richard Clapton, Steve Kilbey, Kate Ceberano, Jimmy Barnes, Daryl Braithwaite, and Steve Balbi. Since 2015, he has been involved with Tim Minchin, touring extensively and recording on the album Apart Together.

== Early life and career ==
Housden has played guitar since he was 11 years old. He joined Melbourne band, Show of Hands, at 16, performing regularly around Melbourne, even flying to Tokyo to represent Australia in Yamaha's Band Explosion at the Budokan Stadium. In 1988, Housden began a spell of touring with Daryl Braithwaite. Also in the band, at the time, was Stephen O'Prey on bass guitar (also ex-Show of Hands) and Michael Spiby on lead guitar and backing vocals (ex-Screen Idols).

Housden, O'Prey, and Spiby (now on lead vocals) founded the Badloves in Melbourne with Chris Tabone on drums and initially Spiby's brother, John, on keyboards and saxophone. According to Australian musicologist, Ian McFarlane, they "became a popular live attraction courtesy of regular gigs and a fine set of laid-back, 1970s-styled blues, Memphis soul and New Orleans R&B material. The band's sound was simple, soulful and very funky. The Badloves were immediately labelled as 'organic', 'neo-hippies' and 'retro', which may have been the case, but at least it showed a band working within a rich musical tradition." The group released two studio albums, Get on Board (June 1993) and Holy Roadside (September 1995), before disbanding in 1997.

In 1999, Housden was one of the session musicians on the Whitlams' fourth studio album, Love This City. In 2001, he became a permanent band member, touring and recording the albums Torch the Moon (2002) and Little Cloud (2006), alongside founding mainstay lead vocalist and pianist, Tim Freedman, bass guitarist, Warwick Hornby and drummer, Terepai Richmond. In February 2022, the Whitlams released their first album in 16 years, Sancho. Housden has remained a member of the Whitlams.

== Solo material and other projects ==
Housden released his self-produced debut solo album, Mad About Disco, in 2004 through Boffin Records, which included the single, "To Die For" (2005). In 2020, Housden released the single Bombs on Triplespeak. Strong on melody, Bombs is a stomper with intoxicating harmonies, and the psychedelic guitar for which Housden has become famous. Produced by Housden, Bombs was mastered at Abbey Road Studios.

Housden has played in numerous bands including Clayton Doley (Hammond organ) Organ Donors and the Sydney psychedelic band, The Dolly Rocker Movement. in recent times, he has featured in various music videos for Tim Minchin, including '15 Minutes' and 'Leaving LA'.

Housden's film & television credits include the Emmy Award-winning animated Beatles series, Beatbugs, for which he recorded on tracks featuring Rod Stewart, Chris Cornell and Regina Spektor. And in 2017, he was the guitarist and Music Advisor on the critically acclaimed ABC biopic Friday on My Mind – The Story of the Easybeats.

=== Genre and style ===
Housden is renowned for his bendy guitar style and highly distinctive tone, as well as his fervent falsetto vocals. He draws upon 1960s and '70s influences including the Beatles, Rolling Stones, and west coast rock bands like the Byrds and Jefferson Airplane.

== Personal life ==
Housden is married to singer and performer Robyn Loau. His brother Stephen Housden is the lead guitarist of Little River Band. He is also the uncle of composer Paul Housden, who was part of the now-defunct Pornland.

== Discography ==
=== Albums ===
- Mad About Disco (2004) Boffin Records / MGM Distribution.
1. To Die For
2. Mad About Disco
3. I Want You Back (don't care what I have to do)
4. Emily, I Stare
5. The Hand of Ruby
6. The Legendary Man from Decca
7. Love Illusion
8. Bus
9. To Make a Fool of You
10. Turn Around (bright eyes)

=== Singles ===
- "To Die For" (2005) Boffin Records
1. To Die For (CD version)
2. Your World/My World
3. The Legendary Man from Decca (Original Version)
4. To Die For (Acoustic Version)
- "Bombs" (2020) Triplespeak / Metropolitan Groove Merchants
1. Bombs
2. She Knows
