= The Lab (Australian band) =

- Origin: Sydney, Australia
- Genres: Synthpop, electronica
- Years active: 1989-1998
- Labels: rooArt, BMG
- Past members: Warwick Factor; Paul McDermott; Yolanda Podolski

The Lab were an Australian electronic band formed by keyboardist Paul McDermott, vocalist Yolanda Podolski and bass guitarist and vocalist Warwick Factor. They issued two extended plays, Ultra (1992) and Terminal (1994), and a studio album, Labyrinth (September 1997) before disbanding in 1998. McDermott, as Paul Mac, also performed in a techno-dance duo Itch-E and Scratch-E from 1991. Factor, as Warwick Hornby, joined the Whitlams in 1999, while Podolski undertook an operatic career.

== History ==
The Lab's Paul McDermott worked with a DJ, Tristan Mason, to develop an early electronic music group in Sydney, which included two bass guitarists. The project's name, "the Lab", developed from an Eric B and Rakim album track, "Step Back" (1990), which includes the lyric: "Now try to do this step ('Back to the lab') and make sure the pace is kept." According to Mason the phrase "described our after gig practices, as in lets go back to The Lab, which was where me, [Mac] and [Podolski] all lived." The Lab were formed in 1989 by McDermott on keyboards and samples, Yolanda Podolski on lead vocals and Warwick Factor on bass guitar and vocals. They were signed with the rooArt label imprint rA. Their first release was the track "Heaven" which was included on rooArt's new artists sampler Young Blood 3 (1991) by Various Artists.

The Lab's early work was characterised by a dense, darkwave-industrial sensibility mixed with techno and synthpop elements with vocals provided by Factor and the operatically-trained mezzo-soprano Podolski. Their early sound displayed influences as varied as Cocteau Twins to Tackhead. (whom they supported at a 1989 Sydney show) and New Order. By 1991 McDermott, as Paul Mac, had also formed an electronic, techno-dance duo Itch-E and Scratch-E with Andy Rantzen (of Pelican Daughters). Tom Ellard from Severed Heads helped produce an album during this era that was never released, and only a smattering of their darker material made its way on to the Ultra (November 1992) and Terminal (March 1994) extended plays.

The Lab's live performances, mostly at Sydney inner-city venues the Annandale Hotel or the Phoenician Club, used multiple film and/or video projectors, displaying surreal footage and stills synchronised with songs being played. While the group's tracks appeared on youth radio station Triple J, they never achieved high-level commercial success. The Lab took a recording hiatus during the mid-1990s as McDermott concentrated on Itch-E and Scratch-E. Australian musicologist Ian McFarlane compared McDermott's two groups, "unlike [Itch-E and Scratch-E], the Lab concentrated on a more emotional and accessible sound." Two singles, "Beautiful Sadness" (1996) and "I Will Find You" (1997), were released in advance of the Lab's debut album, Labyrinth (September 1997). By that time their sound was ambient-pop-oriented music, with little commercial success.

Labyrinth was the Lab's final album and the group disbanded in 1998 as the members pursued solo and other projects. McDermott performed in Itch-E and Scratch-E (and associated projects) until 2001, when he issued his solo album, 3000 Feet High. Factor, as Warwick Hornby, joined the Whitlams in 1999. Podolski undertook an operatic career including performances of Richard Straus' opera Elektra at Capitol Theatre, Sydney in 2000.

== Discography ==
=== Albums ===
List of albums, with selected details
Title	Details
Labyrinth	Released: September 1997; Label: rooArt (74321522022); Format: CD

=== Extended plays ===
List of EPs, with selected details
Title	Details
Ultra	Released: November 1992; Label: Ra Records (4509905202); Format: CD
Terminal	Released: 1993; Label: Ra Records (4509938232); Format: CD
