= Warwick Hornby =

Australian musician

Warwick Hornby is an Australian musician, best known for his time as bassist for The Whitlams. He joined the band together with drummer Terepai Richmond in 1998, and remained with them until 2022.

Warwick was born near Manchester, England, and emigrated to South Australia with his family in 1966. Encouraged by his parents to take up guitar at age 11, he studied music for 2 years and formed his first band, 'Virginia Wolfe' with friends from the same area. They played high school shows, local clubs and entered Hoadley's Battle of the Sounds, where they were the youngest entrants. After winning their heat but then being disqualified for being ineligible for that particular heat, they were asked to perform in the final as a non competing opening act at Adelaide Town Hall. Warwick studied at the Adelaide School of Audio Engineering in 1983, where he met Hamish Marr and Rappo, two musicians from Adelaide band 'These Cars Collide', who were looking for a bassist. He joined and the band moved to Sydney in 1984. Since then, Warwick has gone on to record and tour with Smash Mac Mac, Filthy Children (with Greg Jordan, Tony Buck and Linda Patching), The Infidels, Jan Hellriegel (NZ), Peggy Van Zalm, The Lab, Christine Anu and Paul Mac, and as a solo artist under the name Warwick Factor. He has also recorded with Max Sharam and Diana Anaid, (where he met his future Whitlams cohorts, Jak Housden and Terepai Richmond). Warwick produced re-mixes for The Lab and The Infidels.

== Warwick's equipment ==
Warwick plays a G&L L.2500 5-string bass and a Peavey Midi Bass. Peavey amplification. Fx = Electro Harmonix Pog and Big Muff Deluxe, Aguilar Filter Twin, Boss Flanger.
