= Triple J's Hottest 100 of 1997 =

Most popular songs of the year in Australia

1997 Triple J Hottest 100
- Album artwork for the CD compilation

Countdown details
- Date of countdown: 26 January 1998

Countdown highlights
- Winning song: The Whitlams "No Aphrodisiac"
- Most entries: The Whitlams; The Verve; Radiohead; Jebediah; Silverchair; The Living End; Faith No More; Grinspoon; Ween; The Bloodhound Gang; Arkarna; Everclear (2 tracks)

Chronology
← Previous; 1996	Next → 1998 (Of All Time)

The 1997 Triple J Hottest 100, was a countdown of the most popular songs of the year, according to listeners of the Australian radio station Triple J, and was broadcast on January 26, 1998. A CD featuring 31 of the songs was released. A countdown of the videos of most of the songs was also shown on the ABC music series Rage. The announcement of "No Aphrodisiac" as the year's most popular song was announced by former Prime Minister Gough Whitlam, the namesake of the winning group.

== Full list ==
Note: Australian artists

#	Song	Artist	Country of origin
1	No Aphrodisiac	The Whitlams	Australia
2	Song 2	Blur	United Kingdom
3	Tubthumping	Chumbawamba	United Kingdom
4	Bitter Sweet Symphony	The Verve	United Kingdom
5	Backdoor Man	Pauline Pantsdown	Australia
6	Dammit	Blink-182	United States
7	Paranoid Android	Radiohead	United Kingdom
8	The Beautiful People	Marilyn Manson	United States
9	Karma Police	Radiohead	United Kingdom
10	Leaving Home	Jebediah	Australia
11	Walkin' on the Sun	Smash Mouth	United States
12	One Angry Dwarf and 200 Solemn Faces	Ben Folds Five	United States
13	Freak	Silverchair	Australia
14	Down Again	The Superjesus	Australia
15	Prisoner of Society	The Living End	Australia
16	Everybody's Free (To Wear Sunscreen)	Quindon Tarver	United States
17	Crazy	Cordrazine	Australia
18	Into My Arms	Nick Cave & the Bad Seeds	Australia
19	Everyday Formula	Regurgitator	Australia
20	I Will Survive	Cake	United States
21	Monkey Wrench	Foo Fighters	United States
22	The Drugs Don't Work	The Verve	United Kingdom
23	Calypso	Spiderbait	Australia
24	A.D.I.D.A.S.	Korn	United States
25	Hitchin' a Ride	Green Day	United States
26	The Perfect Drug	Nine Inch Nails	United States
27	The Door	Silverchair	Australia
28	Cows with Guns	Dana Lyons	United States
29	Semi-Charmed Life	Third Eye Blind	United States
30	Forty Six & 2	Tool	United States
31	Ashes to Ashes	Faith No More	United States
32	Coma	Pendulum	Australia
33	Military Strongmen	Jebediah	Australia
34	DC×3	Grinspoon	Australia
35	Summertime	The Sundays	United Kingdom
36	Mutilated Lips	Ween	United States
37	Naughty Boy	The Mavis's	Australia
38	The Memory Remains	Metallica	United States
39	Captain (Million Miles an Hour)	Something for Kate	Australia
40	Why's Everybody Always Pickin' on Me?	Bloodhound Gang	United States
41	Deadweight	Beck	United States
42	Brimful of Asha	Cornershop	United Kingdom
43	You're Not the Only One Who Feels This Way	Ammonia	Australia
44	Temptation	The Tea Party	Canada
45	Wrong Number	The Cure	United Kingdom
46	Fire Water Burn	Bloodhound Gang	United States
47	(Can't You) Trip Like I Do	Filter and The Crystal Method	United States
48	Anatomically Correct	Custard	Australia
49	From Here on In	The Living End	Australia
50	Eat Me	Arkarna	United Kingdom
51	So Much for the Afterglow	Everclear	United States
52	#1 Crush	Garbage	United States
53	You Sound Like Louis Burdett	The Whitlams	Australia
54	Everything to Everyone	Everclear	United States
55	Love Rollercoaster	Red Hot Chili Peppers	United States
56	Funky Shit	The Prodigy	United Kingdom
57	Girl at the Bus Stop	My Drug Hell	United Kingdom
58	I Go Off	Diana Ah Naid	Australia
59	Your Woman	White Town	United Kingdom
60	New York City	They Might Be Giants	United States
61	Block Rockin' Beats	The Chemical Brothers	United Kingdom
62	The End Is the Beginning Is the End	The Smashing Pumpkins	United States
63	Repeat	Grinspoon	Australia
64	Stripsearch	Faith No More	United States
65	The Outdoor Type	The Lemonheads	United States
66	JC	Powderfinger	Australia
67	I Choose	The Offspring	United States
68	Cosmic Girl	Jamiroquai	United Kingdom
69	Waving My Dick in the Wind	Ween	United States
70	Place Your Hands	Reef	United Kingdom
71	Sick With Love	Robyn Loau	Australia
72	Pulse	Front End Loader	Australia
73	Lakini's Juice	Live	United States
74	The Ghost of Tom Joad	Rage Against the Machine	United States
75	Female of the Species	Space	United Kingdom
76	Legend of a Cowgirl	Imani Coppola	United States
77	Lovefool	The Cardigans	Sweden
78	Degenerate Boy	The Mark of Cain	Australia
79	All Mine	Portishead	United Kingdom
80	Faded	Ben Harper	United States
81	Did It Again	Kylie Minogue	Australia
82	Shake Hands with Beef	Primus	United States
83	I Wanna Be a Drug-Sniffing Dog	Lard	United States
84	Feelin' Kinda Sporty	Dave Graney 'n' the Coral Snakes	Australia
85	Nightmare	Brainbug	United Kingdom
86	Smokin' Johnny Cash	The Blackeyed Susans	Australia
87	6 Underground	Sneaker Pimps	United Kingdom
88	Nothing	Beaverloop	Australia
89	Not If You Were the Last Junkie on Earth	The Dandy Warhols	United States
90	Society	Pennywise	United States
91	Remember Me	Blue Boy	United Kingdom
92	Titanic Days	Sidewinder	Australia
93	Weightlessness	Skunkhour	Australia
94	Way of All Things	Rebecca's Empire	Australia
95	Don't Leave	Faithless	United Kingdom
96	Bound for the Floor	Local H	United States
97	The Future's Overrated	Arkarna	United Kingdom
98	Da Funk	Daft Punk	France
99	Naked Eye	Luscious Jackson	United States
100	I Give In	Effigy	Australia

== Statistics ==
=== Artists with multiple entries ===
#	Artist	Tracks
2	The Whitlams	1, 53
2	The Verve	4, 22
2	Radiohead	7, 9
2	Jebediah	10, 33
2	Silverchair	13, 27
2	The Living End	15, 49
2	Faith No More	31, 64
2	Grinspoon	34, 63
2	Ween	36, 69
2	The Bloodhound Gang	40, 46
2	Arkarna	50, 97
2	Everclear	51, 54

=== Countries represented ===
Nation	Total
United States	40
Australia	34
United Kingdom	23
Canada	1
France	1
Sweden	1

=== Records ===
- Dave Grohl and The Smashing Pumpkins made their fifth consecutive appearance in the Hottest 100, both having featured in every annual countdown to date.
- Pauline Pantsdown's track "Back Door Man" which came in at No. 5, was banned by a court injunction from Pauline Hanson only 11 days after being first broadcast by Triple J. "Back Door Man" by is only song that has been voted into, but omitted from the airplay of a countdown.
- The 1997 Hottest 100 is the most diverse list, with 88 different artists appearing throughout the countdown.

== Top 10 Albums of 1997 ==
Bold indicates winner of the Hottest 100.

#	Artist	Album	Country of origin	Tracks in the Hottest 100
1	Radiohead	OK Computer	United Kingdom	7, 9, (55 in 1998)
2	Regurgitator	Unit	Australia	19, (6, 26, 32 in 1998)
**3**	**The Whitlams**	**Eternal Nightcap**	Australia	**1, 53, (37, 43, 56 in 1998)**
4	Grinspoon	Guide to Better Living	Australia	34, 63, (74 in 1995) (18, 79 in 1998)
5	Jebediah	Slightly Odway	Australia	10, 33, (7, 42, 91 in 1998)
6	Silverchair	Freak Show	Australia	13, 27
7	Faith No More	Album of the Year	United States	31, 64
8	Live	Secret Samadhi	United States	73
9	The Verve	Urban Hymns	United Kingdom	4, 22
10	Portishead	Portishead	United Kingdom	79

== CD release ==
Disc 1
No.	Title	Artist(s)	Length
1.	"No Aphrodisiac" (#1)	The Whitlams	4:19
2.	"Song 2" (#2)	Blur	2:01
3.	"Bitter Sweet Symphony" (#3)	The Verve	5:57
4.	"Dammit" (#6)	Blink-182	2:45
5.	"Paranoid Android" (#7)	Radiohead	6:23
6.	"The Beautiful People" (#8)	Marilyn Manson	3:39
7.	"Leaving Home" (#10)	Jebediah	2:58
8.	"Walkin' on the Sun" (#11)	Smash Mouth	3:25
9.	"Down Again" (#14)	The Superjesus	5:05
10.	"One Angry Dwarf and 200 Solemn Faces" (#12)	Ben Folds Five	3:50
11.	"Freak" (#13)	Silverchair	3:45
12.	"Everybody's Free (To Wear Sunscreen)" (#16)	Quindon Tarver	7:08
13.	"Prisoner of Society" (#15)	The Living End	3:52
14.	"Crazy" (#17)	Cordrazine	4:01
15.	"Everyday Formula" (#19)	Regurgitator	2:10
16.	"Monkey Wrench" (#21)	Foo Fighters	3:51
17.	"I Go Off" (#58)	Diana ah Naid	3:09

Disc 2
No.	Title	Artist(s)	Length
1.	"Into My Arms" (#18)	Nick Cave and the Bad Seeds	4:11
2.	"Calypso" (#23)	Spiderbait	1:50
3.	"Lakini's Juice" (#73)	Live	4:58
4.	"The Perfect Drug" (#26)	Nine Inch Nails	5:15
5.	"DC×3" (#34)	Grinspoon	2:54
6.	"Semi-Charmed Life" (#29)	Third Eye Blind	4:27
7.	"Naughty Boy" (#37)	The Mavis's	3:12
8.	"Brimful of Asha" (#42)	Cornershop	4:04
9.	"Funky Shit" (#56)	The Prodigy	5:16
10.	"Fire Water Burn" (#46)	Bloodhound Gang	4:51
11.	"Place Your Hands" (#70)	Reef	3:37
12.	"Legend of a Cowgirl" (#76)	Imani Coppola	3:47
13.	"Pulse" (#72)	Front End Loader	3:06
14.	"Did It Again" (#81)	Kylie Minogue	4:14
15.	"6 Underground" (#87)	Sneaker Pimps	3:48
16.	"Remember Me" (#91)	Blue Boy	3:57

The CD also has an interactive component that could be accessed on a PC.

A later version, released under the Warner label, omitted "The Beautiful People", "One Angry Dwarf and 200 Solemn Faces", "Lakini's Juice, and "The Perfect Drug", but included "Cows with Guns" by Dana Lyons on the first disc and "Cosmic Girl" by Jamiroquai on the second disc.

== See also ==
- 1997 in music
