= Blow Up the Pokies =

2000 single by The Whitlams

Single by The Whitlams

from the album Love This City
- Released: 29 May 2000
- Genre: Piano rock
- Length: 3:27
- Songwriters: Tim Freedman, Greta Gertler

The Whitlams singles chronology
"Thank You (for Loving Me at My Worst)" (2000)	"Blow Up the Pokies" (2000)	"Made Me Hard" (2001)

"Blow Up the Pokies" is a song by the Australian band The Whitlams, released in May 2000 as the second single from their fourth studio album, Love This City, it peaked at number 21 on the ARIA Singles Chart.

In January 2018, as part of Triple M's "Ozzest 100", the 'most Australian' songs of all time, "Blow Up the Pokies" was ranked number 84.

== Lyrics ==
The lyrics written by lead singer Tim Freedman were a statement on the destruction he saw in original Whitlams bassist Andy Lewis's life due to his gambling. The original music and some lyrics were written by Greta Gertler. The song was originally called "Dwell" before being later adapted by Freedman. During the band's Canadian tour in April 2000 supporting Blue Rodeo, the band received word Lewis had committed suicide back in Australia. Freedman soon after wrote "The Curse Stops Here", a piece describing being the "last one" from the original line-up of the band, and voicing his determination to survive. "The Curse Stops Here" was included as a B-side track on the "Blow Up the Pokies" single and also appeared on the album Little Cloud. The song was re-recorded for its single release, with new vocals and different instrumentation. This version appeared on their best-of compilation in 2008.

== Music video ==
A music video was made for the song and features all four members playing in an abandoned theatre. The theatre depicted in the music video is the Princess Theatre in the Brisbane suburb of Woolloongabba.

== Reception ==
The Guardian said, "this protest anthem about the poison of gambling in Australia is the Whitlams’ biggest radio hit. Knowing that Lewis killed himself just three months after this album was released, having just lost a week’s wages to the pokies, makes it even more impactful."

== Track listing ==
1. "Blow Up the Pokies" (Ocean Way Radio Mix) – 3:25
2. "Thank You (for Loving Me at My Worst) (Single Edit) – 3:52
3. "Bring Me Back" (Full Band Version) – 4:54
4. "Putting On a Show" – 2:01
5. "The Curse Stops Here" – 3:37

== Charts ==
Chart (2000)	Peak position
Australia (ARIA)	21
