= Love Is a Four Letter Word (TV series) =

- Created by: Michael Miller; Shelley Birse
- Written by: Michael Miller; Shelley Birse; Ellie Beaumont; Matt Ford
- Directed by: Daniel Nettheim; Kay Pavlou; Tony Tilse
- Starring: Peter Fenton; Kate Beahan; Leeanna Walsman; Paul Barry; Linal Haft; Matt Doran

Production
- Executive producer: Tim Pye
- Producer: Rosemary Blight

Original release
- Network: ABC
- Release: 30 January – 24 July 2001

Love Is a Four Letter Word is an Australian drama written by Matt Ford produced by the Australian Broadcasting Corporation in 2001. It was set and filmed in Newtown, in Sydney, New South Wales, following the lives of a group of friends working in a pub, and the concerns facing urban 20somethings in Australia. One of the regular features of the drama was a performance in the pub by a contemporary Australian band. The program is currently in syndication in the United States on Vibrant TV Network.

== Cast and characters ==
- Peter Fenton as Angus O'Neil
- Kate Beahan as Alicia 'Albee' Barrett
- Paul Barry as Paul Bannister
- Leeanna Walsman as Larissa Barrett
- Linal Haft as Bernie O'Neil
- Matt Doran as Phil 'Klaus' Kaperberg
- Teresa Page as Juliette Briones
- John Molloy as Roy Williams
- Garry McDonald as Tom Mattingly
- Annie Davis-McCubbin as Maya Fink
- Rudi Baker as Quentin Richards
- Joanne Priest as Rachel Fox
- Paul Tassone as Eddie Bird
- Damian Walshe-Howling as Dean Masselos
- Joel McIlroy as Brent Duffy
- Zoe Coyle as Melissa Duvet
- Genevieve Mooy as Evelyn Richards
- Jack Finsterer as Evan Green (5 episodes)
- Ben Mendelsohn as Self (1 episode)

== Featured bands ==
- pre.shrunk
- Machine Gun Fellatio
- The Duvets (fictitious band created for the show)
- Stella One Eleven
- Widow Jones
- On Inc
- Jackie Orszaczky and the Grandmasters
- Nokturnl
- Hamish Cowan
- Jodi Phillis
- I Can't Believe It's Not Rock
- Bernie Hayes
- Luke Hanigan
- The Dumb Earth
- Endorphin
- Tim Freedman
- Sunk Loto
- Christa Hughes
- Felicity Hunter

== Soundtrack ==
love is a four letter word

- Tracks:

1. Daniel Denholm – Albee's Theme
2. Machine Gun Fellatio – I'm Not Afraid Of Romance
3. pre.shrunk – Sound Pimp
4. The Dumb Earth – Auld Lanxiety Attack
5. The Whitlams – Charlie No 1
6. Jodi Phillis – Waiting, Wanting, Holding
7. Hamish Cowan – I'll Never Grow Up
8. Bernie Hayes – You Made Me Hard
9. Stella One Eleven – The River
10. Endorphin – Free
11. Nitocris – Spouse Killer
12. Sunk Loto – Shiver
13. Lo-Tel – Disconnected (Acoustic Version)
14. Christa Hughes – Carrot Day
15. Felicity Hunter – Angel Fire
16. Bernie Hayes and the Shouties – Long Letter
17. pre.shrunk – Hot Robots
18. Daniel Denholm – Angus's Theme

== See also ==
- Twentysomething – a comedy series from 2007-13, set in Melbourne
