= Stupor Ego =

Live album by The Whitlams
- Released: 1996
- Recorded: 1994–1995
- Genre: Piano rock
- Length: 26:55
- Label: Black Yak / Phantom Records

The Whitlams chronology
Undeniably the Whitlams (1995)	Stupor Ego (1996)	Eternal Nightcap (1997)

Stupor Ego, released in 1996, is the first live album to be released by The Whitlams.

The album contains live recordings from performances at the Harbourside Brasserie in mid-1994, and at Goosens Hall on July 30, 1995, as part of national radio station Triple J's Real Appeal broadcast.

When asked if Stupor Ego would be re-pressed Tim Freedman replied:

"I want 'Jesus' gone. It offends people and death threats are no fun ... Mixed with this motive was my perception that people were buying [Stupor Ego] at gigs thinking it represented what they had just seen. They would get a shock when they got home and played it.

Due to its discontinued status, extreme rarity and nostalgia value (it features The Whitlams in the initial trio of Tim Freedman, Stevie Plunder and Andy Lewis), copies of this CD have been known to sell for hundreds of dollars.

== Track listing ==
1. "Stuck In The Middle [With You]" (J. Egan, G. Rafferty) - 3:24
2. "Dumb Bloke" (W. Madigan) - 2:08
3. "Rollercoaster" (J. Richman) - 2:18
4. "Ballad Of A Thin Man" (B. Dylan) - 3:41
5. "Met My Match" (T. Freedman, A. Lewis) - 3:51
6. "Happy Days" (S. Plunder) - 2:12
7. "Ballad Of Lester Walker" (S. Plunder) - 3:57
8. "I Get High" (T. Freedman, S. Plunder) - 3:33
9. "Jesus Has Got an Erection" (T. Freedman, G. Gershwin, I. Gershwin) - 1:49

== Personnel ==
- Stevie Plunder - guitar, vocals
- Tim Freedman – piano, vocals
- Andy Lewis – double bass, backing vocals
- Stuart Eadie - drums
- Michael Vidale – bass (Tracks 7–9)

== Trivia ==
Tracks 1 through 7 are given inaccurate duration in the liner notes. This varies from a few seconds to 23 seconds (for Track 7, listed as 3:34 in the notes).

Track 3, though printed in the notes (and on the disc itself) as Rollercoaster, is a cover of "Roller Coaster By The Sea" by Jonathan Richman and the Modern Lovers. It is preceded by a few bars of The Whitlams' song "Gough".

The Gershwin brothers are, for Track 9, jointly credited with Tim in the notes (and on the disc) as "G & I Gerschwin".
