= My Drug Hell =

British rock band

- My Drug Hell 2 Album Cover

Background information
- Origin: Shepherd's Bush, London, England
- Genres: Rock, pop, power pop, indie
- Years active: 1993–present
- Labels: UK Diversity, Voltone, Forthesakeofthesong, US Countdown/Unity, Aus TWA, Shimmydisc
- Members: Tim Briffa, Harry Stam, Steve Jones
- Website: www.mydrughell.com

My Drug Hell are a British rock band. Their current line up is vocals and guitarist Tim Briffa, bass Harry Stam, drums Steve Jones.

== Career ==
After a brief stint in the band Chelsea, Tim Briffa formed the Atomic Vicars with Paul Donnelly on bass and Chris Argyrou on drums. They released one 7" single after which Argyrou left to be replaced by Joe Bultitude. Soon after they changed their name to My Drug Hell (a reference to an over-used tabloid headline.)

Debut single "Girl at the Bus Stop" was released in the UK by Diversity where it spent several weeks in the Melody Maker/NME independent charts, becoming Single Of the Week on Radio 1's Evening Session as well as several shows on XFM and GLR. In Australia it was released through TWA Records making Triple J's Hot Hundred for 1997 and in the US via Countdown/Unity where it spent over three months in the college charts and was Number 1 Most Requested on every commercial station to play it, including a record ten-week run on WHTG in New Jersey. The song was later used in a Miller Genuine Draft Beer commercial and two feature films Origin Of the Species and Black Circle Boys. The accompanying video also won a Best Video vote on MTV's Alternative Option.

Two more UK singles followed ("2am", "You Were Right I was Wrong"), both making the Indie Top 10.

Their This is My Drug Hell LP was recorded at the all-analogue Toe Rag Studios, but was delayed due to a series of technical problems including the loss of half the master mixes due to a faulty tape machine. Two weeks before its planned UK release Diversity went bust.

By this time the album had been released in the US and Australia where it received a series of rave reviews and made the US Specialty Show Top 10. The album was eventually released in the UK through the band's own Voltone label along with a single of "Maybe We Could Fly" and a re-release of "Bus Stop", which was Single Of the Weekend on the Mark Goodier show on BBC Radio 1. By this point Bultitude had left, replaced by Raife Burchell (Ed Harcourt, The Lightning Seeds) followed a year later by Donnelly who was replaced by Sebastian Hoog (Izia Higelin.) This second line-up gigged for around three years, before also breaking up. A third incarnation was put together with David Preston on bass and Sebastian Kellig on drums and their second album My Drug Hell 2 was released on Forthesakeofthesong with the single "Mysteries of Love". The song was used in British gangster film, The Crew, along with two other tracks from the album, "Nowhere Town" and "You Don't Need Me Today".

The band recently released their third album entitled The Good Times Are All Gone as well as a four language EP, Spider's Web. Following the departure of Sebastian Kellig and David Preston in early 2017, Briffa put together a new line-up featuring Harry Stam on bass and Steve Jones on drums.

Tim Briffa has recently released a solo album of songs originally written while a schoolboy entitled I Was A Teenage Pop Star as well as a spoof radio show 'Clive Snippett presents 'The Story of The Casual Ties for Radio Midhurst 1379.4FM' and an accompanying album (co-written with John Hodgson) entitled 'World of The Casual Ties – Singles 1966–87'.

After releasing a series of tracks attacking and satirising Govt policy during the lockdowns including Livin’ La Vida Lockdown and a rewrite of John Lennon’s Gimme Some Truth, Briffa was described by Australia’s Freethenation Music as “one of the few British musos to be vocal in his support of freedom of choice and to publicly stand against mandates.”The video for Year of the Rat (I Will Not Comply) was also called “awesome” by Dr Jay Battacharya - founder of The Great Barrington Declaration and current director of America’s National Institute of Health (NIH).

Briffa is also the author of How To Pick Up Girls - A Play which had a two-week run at the Etcetera Theatre in Camden in 2006, a spoken word show entitled I F*cked Nicola Kidman's Arse Double (performed at the Maverick Theatre in Soho in 2019) and a recently published collection of essays entitled Some of My Best Friends Are Goths.

== Analogue recording ==
The band are strong supporters of vinyl and fully analogue recordings which they record in their own studio (Voltone International). As a protest against being asked to provide an extra track for a CD single release, Briffa recorded a 16-minute spoken word diatribe against CDs and digital technology entitled "Bonus Track No 9" which included a request for fans only to buy their releases on vinyl record in future.

== Cover Versions ==
Several My Drug Hell songs have been recorded by other artists including, "Don't Say Goodbye" (Lilys), "Girl at the Bus Stop" (Lida Husik, Kiesgroup, Mr Pink), "Garden Party" (Jason and The Prisms), "Simply Years Ahead", "Smear Campaign" (The Blofelds).

== Discography ==
=== Studio albums ===
- 1996 – This is My Drug Hell
- 2010 – My Drug Hell 2
- 2019 – The Good Times Are All Gone
- 2020 – The Dregs of my Drug Hell- (out-takes from This Is My Drug Hell)

=== Singles ===
- 1995 – "Girl At The Bus Stop" / "Don't Say Goodbye"
- 1996 – "You Were Right I Was Wrong" / "Locked My Heart Up"(alternate version)
- 1997 – "2am" / "Maybe We Could Fly"
- 1998 – "Maybe We Could Fly" / "For Your Eyes"
- 2008 – "Mysteries Of Love" / "Goblins, Mermaids and Things"
- 2018 – "Tuesday Lovebirds" / "Jordan's Bridge"

=== Tim Briffa (solo) ===
- 2020 – I Was A Teenage Pop Star – Songs Written While I Was at School. LP
- 2020 – Next / Funeral Tango (Jacques Brel cover versions). Single
- 2021 – "Livin' La Vida Lockdown" / "Coronavirus Blues". Single
- 2023 – World of the Casual Ties – Singles 1966–87. Album
