= Stevie Plunder =

- Stevie Plunder c. 1994

Background information
- Born: Anthony Dominic Hayes; 15 August 1963; Canberra, Australian Capital Territory, Australia
- Died: 25 January 1996 (aged 32) Wentworth Falls, New South Wales, Australia
- Genres: Pop, rock
- Occupations: Musician, songwriter
- Instruments: Guitar, vocals, bass guitar,
- Years active: 1980–1996
- Labels: Citadel Records, Phantom, Half A Cow Records, Green Fez, Black Yak

Stevie Plunder, born as Anthony Hayes (15 August 1963 – 25 January 1996), was an Australian guitarist and singer-songwriter. He was a founding member of music groups The Plunderers (1984–1995) and The Whitlams (1992–1996).

== Biography ==
=== Early years ===
Stevie Plunder was born as Anthony Hayes in Canberra on 15 August 1963 and grew up in the suburb of Narrabundah. His other musical brothers are Bernie, Pat and Justin Hayes (aka Justin Credible, Stanley Claret). Plunder left school at 15: he played in bands from his late teens, providing guitar and vocals. He was in a folk-pop group, Get Set Go, with Nic Dalton and a pair of sisters, Suzie and Jenny Higgie. In May 1984 Plunder, on guitar and vocals, and Dalton formed The Plunderers. The group issued one compilation album Banana Smoothie Honey (1992) and a handful of singles/mini-albums. Plunder also played with other acts such as The Shout Brothers (aka The Shouties), No Concept, Z For Zip, Smarte Music, Folk U Mate, Captain Denim, Hippy Dribble and The New Christs. After Dalton temporarily left The Plunderers to join The Lemonheads, Plunder joined New Christs on guitar from January 1992 to the end of that year.

=== The Whitlams ===
On 26 January (Australia Day) 1992 while outside Hordern Pavilion where grunge group, Nirvana, were playing during the first Big Day Out, Plunder caught up with Tim Freedman (ex-Itchy Feet, Penguins on Safari). Back in 1987 the pair had first met when Plunder was hired to support Freedman's earlier group. They discussed forming a band and at the end of 1992 they formed The Whitlams as a pop group with Plunder on vocals and guitar; Freedman on vocals and keyboard; and Andy Lewis on double bass and bass guitar (ex-The Plunderers). The group developed their material acoustically on Saturday afternoons at Sandringham Hotel, Newtown. In October 1993 they released their debut album, Introducing the Whitlams.

In December 1993 Plunder performed a Christmas gig as a member of The Shout Brothers, with Peter Velzen on drums (ex-The Plunderers, member of Falling Joys), and Plunder's brothers Pat on guitar and vocals (also Falling Joys) and Bernie on guitar and vocals (ex-Secret Seven, The Tall Shirts, Club Hoy).

The Whitlams, with Stuart Eadie on drums, toured the Australian east coast before recording their follow up album, Undeniably the Whitlams (February 1995). During his time with the group Plunder wrote or co-wrote 18 tracks, including the single, "Following My Own Tracks" (June 1995). By 1995 Plunder was married to Tori.

=== Death ===
On 26 January 1996 Stevie Plunder was found dead at the bottom of Wentworth Falls in the Blue Mountains, apparently a suicide. Plunder's funeral was held in his hometown suburb of Narrabundah in Canberra and a memorial service was held at St Stephen's Church, Newtown in February 1996. The Whitlams' first album after Plunder's death, Eternal Nightcap (March 1997), was dedicated to his memory.
