= Sandringham Hotel, Newtown =

Sandringham Hotel
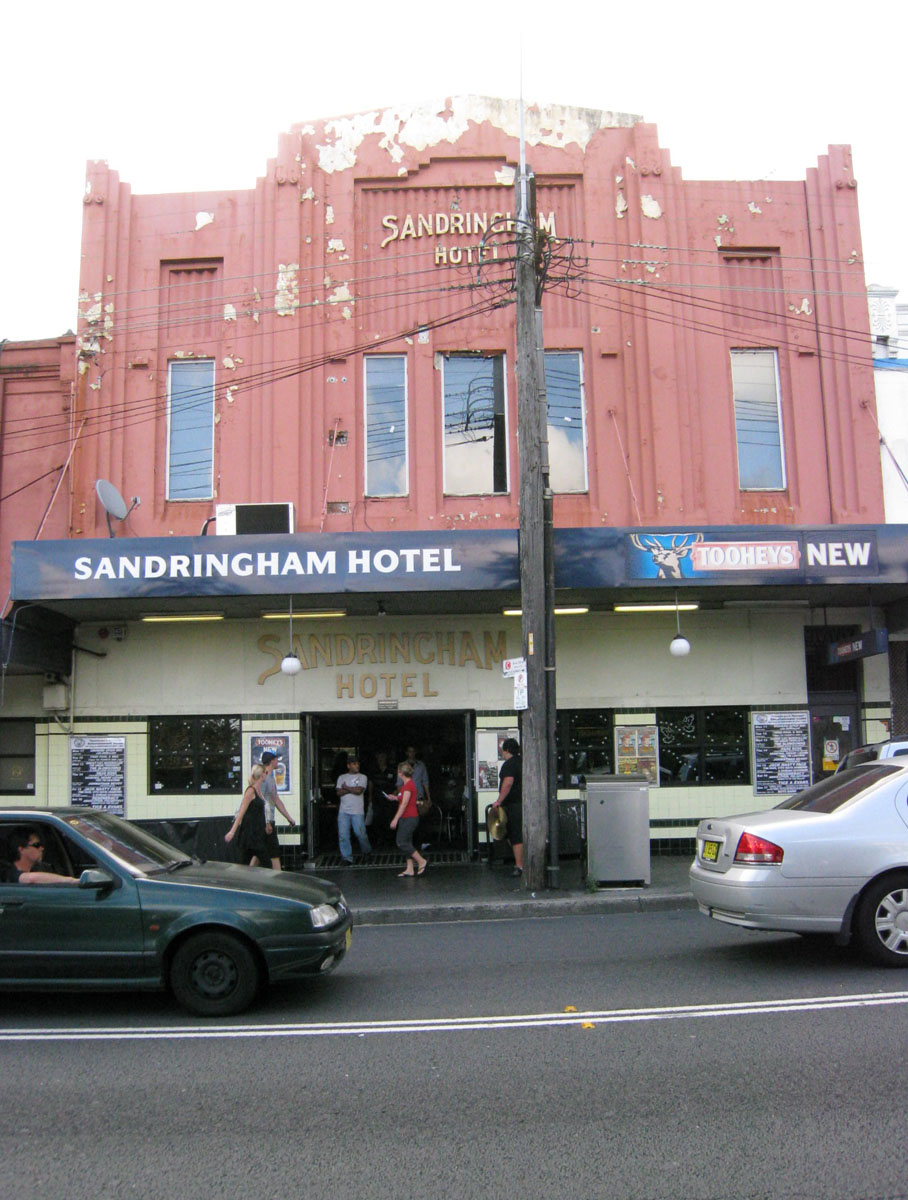
- Sandringham Hotel on King St, Newtown

General information
- Location: 387 King Street, Newtown
- Coordinates: 33°53′58″S 151°10′40″E
- Opened: 1870

The Sandringham Hotel, 387–391 King Street, locally known as The Sando, was a pub in the Inner West suburb of Newtown in Sydney, Australia.

== History ==
The pub first opened in 1870 and has a long history including being the spiritual home to several of Sydney's bands, including Frenzal Rhomb, Bughouse, and The Whitlams.

Before renovations in the late 1990s, the pub had a unique layout. The bar had an art-deco theme and was essentially a large square in the middle of the pub. It was possible to sit at the bar and watch the band on the other side of the bar in the corner. The front-middle stage used to jut into one corner of the square bar allowing performers to rest their beer on the bar at the front of the stage. Between 1980 and 1998 the pub was a thriving live music venue, for most of that time (1985-1998) hosting live music every night and "operating as a gateway to the wider inner Sydney pub rock scene".

Following further renovations, the pub was bought in 2005 by music promoter Tony Townsend, who intended to revitalize the Sando as a live music venue. In June 2012, the Sandringham Hotel was placed in receivership with management owing a reported $3.6 million to creditors. The impending closure of the popular venue caused fans to mobilise a rally to "Save The Sando" on 26 August. The event was publicly supported by musicians Angry Anderson and Tim Freedman and saw an estimated 3000 supporters gather on King Street outside the pub while the former frontman of The Angels, Doc Neeson played to the crowd.

=== The Newtown Social Club ===
In October of the same year, The Sando was purchased by the owners of popular Melbourne rock venue The Corner Hotel and renamed The Newtown Social Club. The band room upstairs reopened in May 2014 with an audience capacity of 300, hosting live acts several nights per week.

=== Holey Moley ===
In July 2017, the Sandringham reopened as Holey Moley, a cocktail bar and 18-hole miniature-golf course. A spokesman for developers Funlab said the new venue would give punters much "good content for Instagram".

== Popular culture ==
- In 1997, Australian band The Whitlams wrote a song about the pub, "God Drinks at The Sando". It appeared on their 1999 album Love This City. Co-written by Tim Friedman and poet Justin Lowe, it was inspired by Lowe's earlier poem "God Drinks at the Sandringham Hotel".
- In 2002, Australian singer/songwriter Jodi Martin recorded her live album, Twenty One Stairs (Recorded Live at The Sando), at the pub.

== See also ==
- List of public houses in Australia
