= Beautiful as You =

Single by The Whitlams

from the album Little Cloud
- Released: 20 February 2007
- Recorded: 2006
- Length: 3:46 (album version); 3:20 (single edit)
- Label: Black Yak Records
- Songwriter(s): James Cooper / Tim Freedman

The Whitlams singles chronology
"Royal in the Afternoon" (2003)	"Beautiful as You" (2007)	"Ballad of Bertie Kidd" (2020)

"Beautiful as You" a song by Australian band, The Whitlams. It was released in February 2007 as the lead and sole single from the band's sixth studio album, Little Cloud. The song peaked at number 40 on the ARIA Charts.

== Track listings ==
CD single

1. "Beautiful as You" – 3:20
2. "Fondness Makes the Heart Grow Absent" (remix) – 4:07
3. "I Was Alive" (live) – 2:51

iTunes

1. "Beautiful as You" – 3:20
2. "Fondness Makes the Heart Grow Absent" (remix) – 4:07
3. "I Was Alive" (live) – 2:51
4. "Friends" – 2:46
5. "Wastin' Time" – 3:15

== Charts ==
Chart performance for "Beautiful as You"
Chart (2007)	Peak position
Australia (ARIA)	40
