= Effigy (band) =

Australian indie pop band

- Origin: Perth, Western Australia, Australia
- Genre: Indie pop
- Years active: 1994–1998
- Label: Roadrunner Records
- Past members: Peter Hardman; Annie Beckerling; Cobina Crawford; Jason Stacey

Effigy were an Australian three-piece indie pop/synth band, formed in Perth in 1994. The band originally consisted of Peter Hardman (vocals, guitar, harmonica), and Annie Beckerling (bass), and Jason Stacey (drums). The band signed to US label, Roadrunner Records, one of the label's first Australian signings, and relocated to Melbourne.

The group released their debut self-titled album, Effigy, in 1997, with the track, "I Give In", placing at No. 100 in the Triple J Hottest 100 for 1997.

Beckerling left the band during the earlier stages of recording their second album and was replaced by Cobina Crawford (ex-Sourpuss). Their second album, Century Collapsing, produced by Kalju Tonuma (The Sharp, Nick Barker, The Mavis's) and Hardman, was released in August 1998 and debuted at No. 68 on the Australian album charts, peaking at No. 65. The first single from the album, "Suspicion Bells", reached No. 90 on the Australian singles chart but the second single, "Caught", failed to chart as successfully, reaching No. 201. They toured nationally in support of The Mavis's and broke up shortly afterwards.

Hardman subsequently moved back to Perth and formed a new version of Effigy as a four-piece, with Rob T (drums), Micheal Boddington (guitar, keyboards) and Peter Twilby (bass).

== Discography ==
=== Albums ===
Album	Details	Peak chart positions
Album	Details	AUS
Effigy	Released: March 1997; Label: Roadrunner Records (RR 8843-2)	108
Century Collapsing	Released: August 1998; Label: Roadrunner Records (RR 8710-2)	65
"—" denotes releases that did not chart.

=== Singles ===
Year	Single	Peak chart positions	Album
Year	Single	AUS	Album
1996	"Lovers"	114	Effigy
1997	"Small"	148	Effigy
1998	"Suspicion Bells"	90	Century Collapsing
1998	"Caught"	201	Century Collapsing
"—" denotes releases that did not chart.
