= Best Work =

Single by The Whitlams

from the album Torch the Moon
- Released: 9 September 2002
- Recorded: 2002
- Length: 4:32 (album version); 3:51 (single edit)
- Label: Black Yak / Phantom
- Songwriter(s): Tim Freedman, Ben Fink

The Whitlams singles chronology
"Fall For You" (2002)	"Best Work" (2002)	"Royal in the Afternoon" (2003)

Best Work is a song by Australian band, The Whitlams. It was released in September 2002 as the second single from their fifth studio album, Torch the Moon. It peaked at number 35 in Australia.

== Reception ==
The Guardian said, "Freedman’s falsetto opener and bold piano sound makes it stand out – along with the great bridge, where the lovely yowl of an electric guitar spills over the crescendo."

== Track listing ==
1. "Best Work" (Single Edit) — 3:51
2. "Cries Too Hard" — 4:11
3. "Out the Back" (Peter Sculthorpe Variation) — 9:45

== Charts ==
Chart (2002)	Peak position
Australia (ARIA)	35
