= My Drug Hell 2 =

Studio album by My Drug Hell
- Released: 2010
- Studios: Voltone, London
- Genres: Rock, Indie, Power pop
- Label: Forthesakeofthesong

My Drug Hell chronology
This is My Drug Hell (1996)	My Drug Hell 2 (2010)	The Good Times Are All Gone(Unreleased) (2015)

My Drug Hell 2 is the second studio album by British rock trio My Drug Hell.

== Track listing ==
No.	Title	Length
1.	"You Don't Need Me Today"	2:21
2.	"Waiting for Anna"	2:20
3.	"Nightgames"	2:27
4.	"Garden Party"	3:14
5.	"Mysteries of Love"	4:14
6.	"Goblins, Mermaids and Things"	2:47
7.	"Nowhere Town"	3:12
8.	"Don't Fall In Love"	3:20
9.	"Something's Not Quite Right"	1:53
10.	"D Is for Delinquent"	3:25
11.	"Any Old Fool"	2:19

== Personnel ==
- Tim Briffa – Vocals, Guitar
- David Preston – Bass guitar
- Sebastian Kellig – Drums
