= This Is My Drug Hell =

This is My Drug Hell

Studio album by My Drug Hell
- Released: September 1996
- Studios: Toe Rag Studios, London
- Genres: Rock, Power pop, Indie
- Labels: Voltone, Forthesakeofthesong

My Drug Hell chronology
This is My Drug Hell (1996)	My Drug Hell 2 (2010)

This is My Drug Hell is the first studio album by British rock group My Drug Hell. The album was recorded in London's all analogue Toe Rag studios - later made famous by the White Stripes' No 1 album Elephant. After a series of setbacks including the loss of half the original mixes due to a faulty tape machine and the bankruptcy of their UK record label two weeks before its intended release date, This Is My Drug Hell was finally released in 1996 and went on to spend 3 months in the US college radio charts as well as making the national Specialty Show Top 10. The album yielded four UK singles - 2am, You Were Right, I Was Wrong, Maybe We Could Fly and Girl at the Bus Stop - the latter becoming Number 1 Most Requested on every US commercial station to playlist it including a record-breaking ten week run on WHTG in New Jersey and several UK Single of the Weeks including shows on XFM, GLR and Radio 1. The song also won a 'Best Video' vote on MTV's Alternative Nation and was used in a Miller Beer TV commercial as well as two feature films (Origin of the Species and Black Circle Boys.)

== Critical reception ==
Chris Adams of Lollipop Magazine wrote that the songs "shimmer and groove along rather pleasantly in a sparse acoustic-electric mix."

== Track listing ==
All tracks are written by Tim Briffa (except Teen Psycho Nightmare No 99 written with Paul Donnelly).

No.	Title	Length
1.	"Don't Say Goodbye"	2:50
2.	"2am"	3:45
3.	"You Were Right, I Was Wrong"	3:42
4.	"Girl At the Bus Stop"	2:37
5.	"Maybe We Could Fly"	3:58
6.	"Jinx's Hole"	3:39
7.	"For Your Eyes"	5:01
8.	"She Locked My Heart Up (And Swallowed the Keys)"	3:46
9.	"Teen Psycho Nightmare No 99"	4:59
10.	"She Flies So High"	7:30
11.	"It's Good But...(Hidden Track)"	3:02

== Personnel ==
- Tim Briffa – Vocals, Guitar
- Paul Donnelly – Bass guitar
- Joe Bultitude – Drums
