= The Whitlams & The Sydney Symphony Live in Concert =

Live album by The Whitlams
- Released: 1 June 2008
- Recorded: 20–22 September 2007
- Genre: Pop
- Length: 37:40
- Label: Black Yak / Warner

The Whitlams chronology
Little Cloud (2006)	The Whitlams & The Sydney Symphony Live in Concert (2008)	Truth, Beauty and a Picture of You (2008)

'The Whitlams & the Sydney Symphony Live in Concert' is a 2008 release by The Whitlams. The album was recorded with the Sydney Symphony Orchestra at the Sydney Opera House 20–22 September 2007. 700,000 copies were made available in the Sunday Telegraph on 1 June 2008, at the time the first non-compilation album to be given away free with a newspaper in Australia.

== Track listing ==
1. "Fondness Makes the Heart Grow Absent" – 4:33
2. "No Aphrodisiac" – 4:36
3. "Keep the Light On" – 3:52
4. "Year of the Rat" – 4:00
5. "Melbourne" – 4:35
6. "Make Me Hard" – 4:20
7. "Thank You (For Loving Me at My Worst)" – 4:20
8. "Gough" – 3:55
9. "Beauty in Me" – 3:13
10. "Up Against The Wall" – 2:49
11. "Charlie No.3" – 4:20
