= Fall for You (The Whitlams song) =

Single by The Whitlams

from the album Torch the Moon
- Released: 17 June 2002
- Recorded: 2002
- Length: 3:47
- Label: Black Yak, Phantom
- Songwriter(s): Tim Freedman, Daniel Denholm
- Producer(s): Daniel Denholm

The Whitlams singles chronology
"Made Me Hard" (2001)	"Fall for You" (2002)	"Best Work" (2002)

"Fall for You" is a song by Australian band, The Whitlams. It was released in June 2002. as the lead single from their fifth studio album Torch the Moon. It peaked at number 21 in Australia.

== Reception ==
The Guardian said, "With its shuffling beat and bendy guitar notes, this is the Whitlams song most often enjoyed by people who don’t normally like the Whitlams. It’s undeniably catchy and the whisper of a woman’s vocals underneath Freedman’s gives it a hypnotic quality."

== Track listing ==
1. "Fall For You" [Single Mix] – 3:50
2. "Fall For You" [Perky Mix] – 3:37
3. "I Will Not Go Quietly (Duffy's Song)" [Album Version] – 3:52
4. "I Will Not Go Quietly (Duffy's Song)" [Radio Edit] – 3:29
5. "One In A Million" ['Love This City' Out-take] – 4:03
6. "Fall For You" [Atomica Remix] – 4:37

== Charts ==
Chart (2002)	Peak position
Australia (ARIA)	21
