= Sancho (album) =

Studio album by Australian band

Studio album by The Whitlams
- Released: 28 January 2022
- Label: EGR
- Producer: Tim Freedman, Daniel Denholm

The Whitlams chronology
Truth, Beauty and a Picture of You (2008)	Sancho (2022)	Kookaburra (2024)

Singles from Sancho
- 1. "Ballad of Bertie Kidd" Released: 30 October 2020; 2. "Man About a Dog" Released: 16 April 2021; 3. "(You're Making Me Feel Like I'm) 50 Again" Released: 18 June 2021; 4. "Cambridge Three" Released: 10 December 2021; 5. "Nobody Knows I Love You" Released: 14 January 2022

Sancho is the seventh studio album by Australian band The Whitlams, released on 28 January 2022. It debuted and peaked at number 21 on the ARIA Albums Chart.

The title is the nickname bandleader Tim Freedman gave the band's late road manager Greg Weaver, who died in 2019.

== Reception ==
Professional ratings
Review scores
Source	Rating
The Music	4/5 stars
NME	4/5 stars
The Sydney Morning Herald	3.5/5 stars

Liz Giuffre from The Music said "Overall, a mixed bag rather than a themed album, and while there are flashes of the different 'types' of Whitlams of the past, Sancho carves its own path.

David James Young from NME said "A wistful, endearing collection of songs from a seemingly-evergreen band, Sancho will have fans feeling thankful that such a triumph has arisen out of such a tragedy."

== Track listing ==
1. "Catherine Wheel" - 3:34
2. "Nobody Knows I Love You" - 5:03
3. "Sancho" - 6:12
4. "In The Last Life" - 4:15
5. "Cambridge Three" - 3:28
6. "(You're Making Me Feel Like I'm) 50 Again" - 3:16
7. "Get a Hotel Room" - 2:58
8. "Sancho in Love" - 5:10
9. "Man About a Dog" - 3:55
10. "Ballad of Bertie Kidd" - 6:09

== Charts ==
Weekly chart performance for Sancho
Chart (2022)	Peak position
Australian Albums (ARIA)	21
