= You Sound Like Louis Burdett =

Single by The Whitlams

from the album Eternal Nightcap
- Released: January 1997
- Recorded: 1996
- Length: 4:01
- Label: Black Yak / Phantom
- Songwriters: Tim Freedman, Mark Wells
- Producers: Rob Taylor & Tim Freedman

The Whitlams singles chronology
"Met My Match" (1995)	"You Sound Like Louis Burdett" (1997)	"No Aphrodisiac" (1997)

"You Sound Like Louis Burdett" is a song by Australian band the Whitlams. It was released in January 1997 as the lead single from their third studio album, Eternal Nightcap. The single was placed at number 53 of Triple J's Hottest 100 of that year.

Louis Burdett is an eccentric inner-west Sydney personality. Tim Freedman once shared a cottage in Tempe with Burdett, who is described on the Whitlams' official site as "an underemployed avant-garde musician." The song's narrator repeatedly scolds himself for sounding like Louis Burdett.

== Reception ==
The Guardian said, "Named for the drummer and Freedman’s one-time housemate, this energetic song is filled with sleazy guitar, jangling piano and a breathless account of life in Sydney that is bewildering to Whitlams fans living anywhere else."

== Track listing ==
1. "You Sound Like Louis Burdett" – 4:00
2. "10 or 11 Drink Clown" – 3:49
3. "Charlie No.3" – 4:29
4. "Hurt" – 3:17
