= Melbourne (song) =

Single by The Whitlams

from the album Eternal Nightcap
- Released: 27 January 1998
- Recorded: 1997
- Length: 4:50 (album version); 4:19 (single mix)
- Label: Black Yak, Phantom
- Songwriter(s): Tim Freedman
- Producer(s): Rob Taylor and Tim Freedman

The Whitlams singles chronology
"No Aphrodisiac" (1997)	"Melbourne" (1998)	"Thank You (for Loving Me at My Worst)" (2000)

"Melbourne" is a song by Australian band, The Whitlams. It was released on 27 January 1998. as the third and final single from their third studio album, Eternal Nightcap. The song peaked at number 70 on the ARIA singles chart in June 1998.

== Track listing ==
1. "Melbourne" – 4:50
2. "Buy Now Pay Later" (Cottco's Dream remix) – 4:34
3. "400 Miles from Darwin" (demo) – 3:21
4. "Your Daddy's Car" – 2:42
5. "Real Emotional Girl" – 2:45

== Charts ==
Chart performance for "Melbourne"
Chart (1998)	Peak position
Australia (ARIA)	70
