= Greta Gertler =

Australian musician

Greta Gertler Gold
- Born: Greta Miriam Gertler; Boston, Massachusetts
- Occupation: Musician
- Website: http://www.GretaGertlerGold.com

Greta Gertler is a pianist, singer, and songwriter. She was Born in Boston, Massachusetts and grew up in Sydney, Australia, and got her start there as a songwriter, performing and penning hits for other artists. She is co-leader of orchestral pop collective, The Universal Thump, with Adam D Gold.

== Early career ==
She self-released Little Sins, and toured the country with her chamber pop combo, Peccadillo. She then moved to New York City and her career developed. In 2001, she took home the grand prize in N.Y.C.'s Indie Band Search Competition for her song "Everyone Wants to Adore You." The song became the first track on Gertler's May 2003 release, The Baby That Brought Bad Weather

== Debut release ==
Her debut solo release "The Baby That Brought Bad Weather" was described as "one of those hoped-for revelations that emerged from the never ending pile of new releases" by Vin Scelsa (WFUV) and "a sonic revelation and lyrical treat" by John Rhodes (Headliner Magazine, Radio City Music Hall). Her next album, Greta Gertler & The Extroverts: Edible Restaurant (2007), featured members of Slavic Soul Party! and the song 'Veselka' (NPR Song of the Day) about the much-beloved Ukrainian diner on 9th/2nd.

== Other accomplishments ==
In Australia, she is a multi-platinum-selling hit songwriter, having co-penned the 'classic rock' hit, "Blow Up the Pokies" (performed by The Whitlams), which was ranked 11th in a popular vote as one of the country's Top 20 Best Songs of All Time. Her song, "Charlie # 3" (also co-written with Tim Freedman and a track on the breakthrough album, "Eternal Nightcap") was performed at the Sydney Opera House by The Whitlams and the Sydney Symphony Orchestra in December 2009.

She has performed and recorded with a diverse range of artists such as Sufjan Stevens ("All Delighted People" EP), Sarah Blasko, Noe Venable, Clare & The Reasons, John Wesley Harding, Missy Higgins, Matt Kanelos, Martha Wainwright, Glenn Tilbrook (Squeeze), Glenn Patscha (Ollabelle), Joan As Policewoman, The Last Town Chorus and Madeleine Peyroux, Elysian Fields and was cited as one of NYC's Top 20 Orchestral Pop artists (the Deli Magazine).

In 2009 a successful Kickstarter campaign raised funds for The Universal Thump, a band co-led by Adam Gold and album loosely inspired by Moby Dick, performed by an orchestral pop collective and initially released in 4 chapters. In 2012 the album was released, along with music videos for the songs 'Flora', 'Darkened Sky' and 'Honey Beat'.

In 2015, after a European tour, The Universal Thump released Walking the Cat: The Abbey Road EP. Subsequently, they released a series of Digital Singles: 'Seder-Masochistic' (along with a popular music video, directed by Greta Gertler Gold), 'Middle Life' and 'Hard to Hope'.

== Musical Theater ==
Greta Gertler Gold is also a composer, lyricist and producer of musical theater. A Yaddo Fellow, Jonathan Larson Grant and NY Women's Fund Finalist, she was awarded a Create NSW Grant with playwright Hilary Bell to write a musical adaptation of Joan Lindsay’s "Picnic at Hanging Rock", directed by Jo Bonney. She produced the first 29-hour reading of “Picnic” in November 2023 at Open Jar Studios, NYC following a music workshop at Ars Nova and a developmental workshop at the Hayes Theatre, Sydney earlier in the year.

She composed music for psychedelic rock musical "The Red Tree" (based on Shaun Tan's book) in collaboration with Hilary Bell for seasons at Sydney Opera House, Arts Centre Melbourne and National Theatre of Parramatta. Gertler Gold and Bell also received a Cultural Grant from the City of Sydney and Create NSW Grant to develop a musical adaptation of Bell & Antonia Pesenti’s "Alphabetical Sydney: All Aboard", which toured Riverside Theatre, Sydney Opera House, The Joan and The Concourse.

Greta and playwright Alexandra Collier were awarded residencies and workshops to develop rock musical “Triplight” at Ucross Foundation (Wyoming), Rhinebeck Writers Retreat, Space at Ryder Farm, New Musicals Australia and The Tank (NYC) culminating in a concert season starring Kristen Sieh and Tony Torn at Joe's Pub at The Public Theater, NYC. Greta was a composer in Ars Nova's "Uncharted" Program and Polyphone Festival (Philadelphia), where she developed the musical "The Real Whisper" with playwright Akin Salawu. She and Stew (Tony Award winning creator of "Passing Strange") were granted a residence at The Orchard to begin development of their musical "Anna Hit". Greta was also a composer in the BMI Lehman Engel Musical Theatre Workshop.

In early 2023, Greta made her Lincoln Center debut with her show ‘Characters’ merging an orchestral pop ensemble with guests from the musical theater world. Greta is also composed music for Dr. Seuss Tonies characters Cat in the Hat, The Lorax, The Grinch and others, in collaboration with LA-based actor-producer, Bill Kates and Adam Gold.

== Personal life ==
Greta is married to drummer, audio engineer/producer Adam Gold. They have two children.
