= I Make Hamburgers =

Single by The Whitlams

from the album Undeniably
- Released: 6 November 1995
- Recorded: 1994
- Length: 3:36
- Label: Black Yak / Phantom
- Songwriter: Tim Freedman
- Producers: Rob Taylor & Tim Freedman

The Whitlams singles chronology
"I Make Hamburgers" (1995)	"Met My Match" (1995)

"I Make Hamburgers" is a song by The Whitlams. It was first released to radio in February 1995 as the band's debut single. It was released on CD single in November 1995 as the first single from their second album, Undeniably.

The song was number 79 in the 1996 Triple J Hottest 100, a ranking of songs voted for by Triple J listeners. It was included on the compilation CD for that year.

== Reception ==
The Guardian said the song was, "the closest to a novelty song the Whitlams have. Hollering 'more sauce!' during live performances ranks up there with 'no way, get fucked, fuck off' in the pantheon of Australian music call and responses. But underneath the fun, it still has heart: a burger-flipping lothario who just likes giving girls the world."

== Track listing ==
1. "I Make Hamburgers" (Radio Mix) - 3:39
2. "I Make Hamburgers" (Rebirthed) - 3:38
3. "Sydney 2000 Olympics Theme" - 4:59
4. "Waiting" - 2:48
5. "Jesus" - 2:02
6. "[untitled]" - 1:09

== Charts ==
Chart performance for "I Make Hamburgers"
Chart (1995)	Peak position
Australia (ARIA)	130
