= Thank You (for Loving Me at My Worst) =

Single by The Whitlams

from the album Love This City
- Released: 10 January 2000
- Genre: Piano rock
- Length: 3:58 (album version) 3:52 (single edit)
- Label: Black Yak / Warner
- Songwriter: Tim Freedman

The Whitlams singles chronology
| "Melbourne" (1998) | "Thank You (for Loving Me at My Worst)" (2000) | "Blow Up the Pokies" (2000) |

"Thank You (for Loving Me at My Worst)" is a song by Australian band, The Whitlams. It was released in January 2000 as the lead single from their fourth album, Love This City. It peaked at number 63 on the ARIA charts.

== Music video ==
The music video for the song revolves around Tim Freedman working at a supermarket, singing the song over a public announcement system while occasionally cleaning or moving from aisle to aisle.

== Track listing ==
1. "Thank You (for Loving Me at My Worst)" [Single Edit] – 3:52
2. "Thank You (for Loving Me at My Worst)" [Short Soup Edit] – 3:38
3. "Chunky Chunky Air Guitar" – 3:03
4. "Bring Me Back to Your Love" – 4:06
5. "Coming Up for Air" – 3:46
6. "Chunky Chunky Air Guitar" [Mr. Chill & Friends remix] – 5:17

== Charts ==
Chart performance for "Thank You (for Loving Me at My Worst)"
| Chart (2000) | Peak position |
|---|---|
| Australia (ARIA) | 63 |
