= Undeniably the Whitlams =

1995 studio album by the Whitlams

Studio album by The Whitlams
- Released: 1995
- Recorded: 1994
- Genre: Pop
- Length: 59:43
- Label: Black Yak / Phantom
- Producer: Rob Taylor

The Whitlams chronology
Introducing the Whitlams (1993)	Undeniably the Whitlams (1995)	Stupor Ego (1996)

Singles from Undeniably the Whitlams
- 1. "I Make Hamburgers" Released: February 1995; 2. "Met My Match" Released: June 1995

Undeniably the Whitlams is the second studio album by Australian band the Whitlams, released by Black Yak / Phantom in 1995. Due to popular request, it was re-released in 2001 as Undeniably the Whitlams - Reworked. It is their last album to feature guitarist Stevie Plunder.

== Reworked edition ==
In 2001, Tim Freedman reworked much of the album, dedicating it to the memory of Stevie Plunder and Andy Lewis. Freedman explained that the original recordings and mixings had been rushed, and that these new versions were more comparable to the band's original vision.

Roughly half of the album was left as is, while "Met My Match", "Following My Own Tracks", "1995", "End of Your World" and "Shining" were remixed, often resulting in a marked difference from the originals. As well as this, "I Make Hamburgers" was replaced on the album with its single mix, and two previously unreleased songs, "Why Doesn't Andy?" and "Where Are You?" were included.

Initially, these two new tracks were scarcely anything more than demos, and were eventually fleshed out by Freedman, aided by current Whitlams members Jak Housden and Terepai Richmond.

== Track listing ==
1. "Peter Collard" (S. Plunder) – 3:14
2. "Met My Match" (T. Freedman, A. Lewis) – 3:36
3. "Following My Own Tracks" (S. Plunder) – 3:32
4. "1995" (T. Freedman, A. Lewis, S. Plunder) – 4:41
5. "End of Your World" (S. Plunder) – 4:40
6. "Pass the Flagon" (S. Plunder) – 3:32
7. "I Make Hamburgers" (T. Freedman) – 3:36
8. "You'll Find a Way" (T. Freedman) – 4:25
9. "Don't Love Too Long" (T. Freedman after W.B. Yeats) – 2:46
10. "You Don't Even Know My Name" (S. Plunder) – 3:01
11. "Shining" (S. Plunder) – 4:15
12. "I Get High" (T. Freedman, S. Plunder) – 3:21
13. "Hollow Log" (S. Plunder) – 2:07
14. "If I Only Had a Brain" (E. Harburg, H. Arlen) – 2:19
15. "I'm Still Faithful" (T. Freedman) – 0:56

=== 2001 Bonus Tracks ===
16. "Why Doesn't Andy?" (T. Freedman) – 3:10
17. "Where Are You?" (S. Plunder) – 4:34

Both the original and the reworked versions of the album contain an unlisted final track, featuring snippets of songs, radio interviews, phone calls, etc. These are 5:02 and 5:40 in length on the original and reworked, respectively.

== Personnel ==
- Tim Freedman – piano, keyboards and vocals
- Andy Lewis – double bass and backing vocals
- Stevie Plunder – guitar and vocals
- Stevie Wishart – hurdy-gurdy (tracks 2 and 4) and sustained violin (track 8)
- Stuart Eadie – drums (tracks 1, 2, 3, 4, 5, 6, 7, 8, 9, 13)
- Nick Cecire – drums (tracks 10, 11, 12)
- Chris Abrahams – Hammond organ (tracks 2, 11) and piano (track 10)
- Terepai Richmond – drums (tracks 16 and 17) and backing vocals (track 17)
- Jak Housden – guitar solo (track 16)
- Ronald S. Peno – backing vocals (track 4)
- Al Jones – piano (track 6)
- Holden Kingswood – chamois solo (track 7)
- Catherine Brownhill – violin and viola (tracks 8 and 17)
- Sophie Wheeler – cello (tracks 8 and 17)
- Ken Maeda – string arrangement (track 8)
- David Pitchfork – trumpet (track 17)
- Rob Taylor – producer and engineer
- Simon Sheridan – engineer
- Michelle Arcane – photography
- Peter Fitzpatrick – photography
- Guy Fleming – photography

== Charts ==
Chart performance for Undeniably the Whitlams
Chart (1995–98)	Peak position
Australia (ARIA)	167
