= Made Me Hard =

Single by The Whitlams

from the album Love This City
- Released: May 2001
- Recorded: 1999
- Length: 3:33
- Label: Black Yak, Phantom
- Songwriter: Bernie Hayes
- Producer: Joe Hardy

The Whitlams singles chronology
"Blow Up the Pokies" (2000)	"Made Me Hard" (2001)	"Fall for You" (2002)

"Made Me Hard" a song by Australian band, the Whitlams. Released in May 2001 as the third and final single from their fourth album, Love This City. It peaked at number 75 in Australia. A music video for the song was filmed in Thailand.

== Track listing ==
1. "Made Me Hard" – 3:33
2. "Gough" (JJJ Live at the Wireless, Nov. 1999) – 3:22
3. "Charlie No.3" (JJJ Live at the Wireless, Nov. 1999) – 4:14
4. "Blow Up the Pokies" (MCM Cold Live at the chapel, May 2000) – 3:28

== Charts ==
Chart performance for "Made Me Hard"
Chart (2001)	Peak position
Australia (ARIA)	75
