= Introducing the Whitlams =

Studio album by The Whitlams
- Released: August 1993
- Recorded: January to March 1993
- Genre: Pop
- Length: 27:29
- Label: Phantom
- Producer: Rob Taylor

The Whitlams chronology
Introducing the Whitlams (1993)	Undeniably the Whitlams (1995)

Introducing the Whitlams is the debut studio album by Australian band The Whitlams, released by Phantom in August 1993. The album features a mix of original and cover songs, including songs written by Whopping Big Naughty frontman Stanley Claret (born Justin Hayes, and credited as Justin Credible in the liner notes), brother of The Whitlams guitarist Stevie Plunder, and Everything but the Girl, among others.

Freedman has noted during a live performance of 'Gough' at The Basement in Sydney that he wrote the song while sharing a home in Newtown with Louis Burdett, and while practising the song, was told by Burdett that if he were going to "rip off Miles Davis, do it f***ing properly." Freedman then changed some notes in the song, making it what he called an "exact copy."

== Track listing ==
1. "The Ballad of Lester Walker" (S. Plunder) – 3:25
2. "Where Is She?" (T. Freedman) – 4:16
3. "Happy Days" (S. Plunder) – 1:41
4. "Gough" (T. Freedman) – 3:16
5. "Mum's Going Out" (J. Credible, B. Rossen) – 0:26
6. "Pigeons in the Attic Room" (T. Thorn, B. Watt) – 1:55
7. "Woody" (T. Freedman) – 1:16
8. "Jumpin' Leprechauns" (J. Richman) – 2:15
9. "I'm Different" (live) (R. Newman) – 2:04
10. "Winter Lovin'" (live) (T. Freedman, A. Lewis, S. Plunder) – 3:18
  - untitled hidden track from 3:48 to 6:50

== Personnel ==
- Tim Freedman - Piano, vocals
- Andy Lewis - Double Bass, backing vocals
- Stevie Plunder - Guitar, Vocals
- Louis Burdett - drums on track 1, Brushes on track 2
- Nick Cecire - cymbals on track 2, Drums on track 4
- Rob Taylor - Producer, Engineer
- Dave Henderson - Engineer
- Guy Fleming - Photography
