= Little Cloud =

Studio album by The Whitlams
- Released: 20 March 2006
- Recorded: 2005–2006
- Genre: Pop
- Length: 53:57
- Label: Black Yak / Warner
- Producer: J. Walker

The Whitlams chronology
| Torch the Moon (2002) | Little Cloud (2006) | The Whitlams & The Sydney Symphony Live in Concert (2008) |

Alternative cover
- Released in the UK as Little Cloud by Tim Freedman

Singles from Little Cloud
- 1. "Beauty In Me" Released: 2006; 2. "I Was Alive" Released: 11 March 2006; 3. "Beautiful as You" Released: 20 February 2007

Professional ratings
Review scores
| Source | Rating |
|---|---|
| AllMusic | 3/5 stars |
| The Sydney Morning Herald | (favourable) |

Little Cloud is the sixth studio album by Australian band The Whitlams, released by Black Yak through Warner on 20 March 2006. It debuted at number four on the ARIA Albums Chart.

== Album information ==
The first disc, entitled Little Cloud, is about returning to Australia from overseas in an election year. The second disc, The Apple's Eye, is mostly thematically centred in New York City. The majority of the album was written by singer/songwriter Tim Freedman whilst he lived for several months in New York.

== Track listing ==
Disc One: Little Cloud

1. "Been Away Too Long" – 3:57
2. "White Horses" – 3:19
3. "I Was Alive" – 3:06
4. "Year of the Rat" – 3:52
5. "Keep the Light On" – 3:40
6. "Tonight" – 3:40
7. "12 Hours" – 2:28
8. "Little Cloud" – 3:30

Disc Two: The Apple's Eye

1. "Beauty in Me" – 3:05
2. "Fondness Makes the Heart Grow Absent" – 3:56
3. "Beautiful as You" – 3:48
4. "Second Best" – 3:15
5. "Fancy Lover" – 3:38
6. "Stay with Me" – 3:09
7. "She's Moving In" – 2:12
8. "The Curse Stops Here" (Live with the West Australian Symphony Orchestra) – 3:22

== Charts ==
| Chart (2006) | Peak position |
|---|---|
| Australian Albums (ARIA) | 4 |

== Certifications ==
| Region | Certification | Certified units/sales |
|---|---|---|
| Australia (ARIA) | Gold | 35,000^{^} |
^{^} Shipments figures based on certification alone.
