= No Aphrodisiac =

1997 single by the Whitlams

Single by the Whitlams

from the album Eternal Nightcap
- Released: 14 December 1997
- Genre: Piano rock
- Length: 3:29 (single mix); 4:19 (album version)
- Label: Black Yak, Phantom
- Songwriters: Tim Freedman, Matt Ford, Glen Dormand
- Producers: Rob Taylor, Tim Freedman

The Whitlams singles chronology
"You Sound Like Louis Burdett" (1997)	"No Aphrodisiac" (1997)	"Melbourne" (1998)

"No Aphrodisiac" is a song by Australian band the Whitlams, released in December 1997 as the second single from their third album, Eternal Nightcap. The song peaked at No. 59 on the Australian Singles Chart. The lead track was written by the band's founding mainstay, Tim Freedman, together with Pinky Beecroft (Matt Ford) and Chit Chat Von Loopin Stab (Glen Dormand): both from the band, Machine Gun Fellatio. It was produced by Freedman with Rob Taylor. "No Aphrodisiac" won Song of the Year at the ARIA Music Awards of 1998. It was listed at No. 1 on the Triple J Hottest 100 for 1997. Former Australian Prime Minister Gough Whitlam, for whom the band was named, announced news of their win on air. One of its B-sides is "Gough". Machine Gun Fellatio provided a re-mix of "No Aphrodisiac" for the remixes version of the single.

== Details ==
"No Aphrodisiac" was written for Freedman's then-girlfriend, who was living in Melbourne, while he was in Sydney. He later recalled, "We were growing apart, not writing to each other so much... Pinky Beecroft and Chit Chat had just played me a demo of theirs, which consisted of very funny personal classifieds, and we used 6 lines of that to finish the song." One of the lyric lines is "truth, beauty and a picture of you", Freedman later explained "their role in the song is just to be comedic. I'm saying 'I miss you but the universe will turn me on in your absence'. Truth of course doesn't exist, and beauty is all."

The single mix version adds more electric guitar and is almost a minute shorter than the album version. This version does not appear on the band's 2008 compilation album, Truth, Beauty and a Picture of You – the title is a line from the lyrics – instead the album version was used, which was also the preferred radio version.

== Reception ==
"No Aphrodisiac" won Song of the Year at the ARIA Music Awards of 1998 and was also nominated for Single of the Year but lost out to Natalie Imbruglia's cover version of "Torn". The track was performed by the band at a ceremony in Sydney before the Millennium. It was also performed live during the closing ceremony of the Sydney 2000 Paralympic Games.

AllMusic's Jonathan Lewis felt it was "a melancholy, piano-driven song about long-distance relationships". According to Bernard Zuel of The Sydney Morning Herald, it was "A ballad about infidelity, or even masturbation – 'there's no aphrodisiac like loneliness' – it became a national love-song request. The single was released independently by Freedman's own label, had no film clip, no commercial radio airplay and no marketing budget."

The Guardian said, "No Aphrodisiac is a demarcation in the Whitlams’ sound: gone were the boyish songs about mates and girls, replaced by melancholic, clever songs about being lonely and drinking too much (and girls). In a neat encapsulation of the band’s shift, Lewis even swapped his double bass for an electric bass halfway through the track."

In 2025, the song ranked 91 on the Triple J's Hottest 100 of Australian Songs.

== Track listings ==
There are four releases of the "No Aphrodisiac" single, one that consists of different mixes of the lead track and three versions which have different bonus tracks as detailed below:

CD-Maxi: BYO-E8 (C) / EAN 9398603201025 (14 December 1997)

1. No Aphrodisiac (single mix) – 3:32
2. Winter Lovin' – 3:22
3. 1995 – 4:44
4. Charlie No.3 – 4:24
5. No Aphrodisiac (edit#1 mix) – 3:28

BYO-E8 "No Aphrodisiac – The Remixes" (1998)

1. No Aphrodisiac (Single mix) – 3:29
2. No Aphrodisiac (Room for your Dog mix) – 5:54
3. No Aphrodisiac (Machine Gun Fellatio mix) – 4:23
4. No Aphrodisiac (Headspace Caisidorpha mix) – 5:25
5. No Aphrodisiac (Album mix) – 4:20

BYO-E8 (A) "No Aphrodisiac" (1998)

1. No Aphrodisiac (single mix) – 3:29
2. Gough – 3:16
3. Met My Match – 3:36
4. Up Against the Wall – 5:28
5. No Aphrodisiac (edit#1 mix) – 3:28

BYO-E8 (B)

1. No Aphrodisiac (single mix) – 3:29
2. Where is She – 4:17
3. I Make Hamburgers – 3:36
4. You Sound Like Louis Burdett – 4:01
5. No Aphrodisiac (edit#1 mix) – 3:28

== Awards and nominations ==
Year	Nominee / work	Award	Result
1998	ARIA Music Awards of 1998	Song of the Year	Won
1998	ARIA Music Awards of 1998	Single of the Year	Nominated
1998	APRA Music Awards of 1998	Song of the Year	Nominated

== Charts ==
Weekly chart performance for "No Aphrodisiac"
Chart (1997–2000)	Peak position
Australia (ARIA)	59
Canada Adult Contemporary (RPM)	79
New Zealand (Recorded Music NZ)	47
