= Terepai Richmond =

Australian drummer (born 1971)

- Also known as: The Pieman
- Born: Terepai Chalmers Richmond; 21 February 1971 (age 55); Sydney, New South Wales, Australia
- Genres: Pop, rock, electronic
- Occupations: Musician, songwriter, surfer
- Instruments: Drums, percussion, vocals
- Years active: 1977–present

Terepai Chalmers Richmond (born 21 February 1971) is an Australian drummer. He joined the Sydney-based rock band The Whitlams in September 1999 and formerly played in acid jazz group Directions in Groove (d.i.g.) (1991–1998, 2008).

== Biography ==
Terepai Chalmers Richmond was born on 21 February 1971 to a Scottish father and a Cook Island mother who ran a restaurant in Sydney. He started drumming in his parents' Polynesian show band at the age of six, with his sister Jennifer dancing, where he performed several shows every week until finishing school at eighteen. After finishing school, he joined Sydney soul/funk outfit Bellydance and another well established funk band Swoop (their song "Everybody Loves The Sunshine" contains the line "Time to boogie to the rhythm of Terepai"). He was the founding drummer and percussionist of acid jazz group, Directions in Groove (dig) formed in Sydney in 1991. The original dig line-up featured keyboardist and vocalist Scott Saunders, saxophonist Rick Robertson, guitarist Tim Rollinson, bassist Alex Hewetson and Richmond as drummer, percussionist and backing vocalist. He contributed song writing to all five dig albums including two live recordings. With Saunders and Samuel Dixon, Richmond went on to form Multiball (1995). Inspired by an encounter with The Roots, Multiball toured extensively and released a self-titled album before bassist Sam Dixon relocated to London. Terepai joined rock band The Whitlams in September 1999 for the release of Love This City, for which he recorded drums. Since then, Terepai has toured and written with the Whitlams.

Richmond has also written and toured for reggae band King Tide, funk veterans Professor Groove and the Booty Affair. As a session drummer, he is regarded as one of the best in Australia. He has worked for other artists including Savage Garden, SoulDecision, Max Sharam, Guy Sebastian, Delta Goodrem, Trevor Guthrie and Hawksley Workman.

Richmond has surfed since the age of eleven, and was once titled "King of the Island" (Shark Island). He has featured in numerous surfing movies including Life Like Liquid (Billabong) alongside Dave Rastovich, "2230" & "Square" to mention a few. He was a team surfer for Mambo in the 1990s. He won numerous surfing titles through the 1980s and 1990s before pursuing a less competitive path. Today, Terepai is renowned for his tube riding skills and can often be found hunting big waves with his eldest son "Tainui" in his local area South of Sydney. Photos of him have been published in surfing literature around the globe.

Richmond and Dixon provided the rhythm section for television and film composer, Stephen Rae's debut solo music album, Feet Lift Off the Ground (2004). He toured extensively with Missy Higgins, both in Australia and the United States, from 2006 to 2010. He has appeared on many Australian and American television shows including "Letterman", "Earth Hour" and "Where I Stood" at the 2007 ARIA Awards. He has also recorded and toured extensively with Guy Sebastian and label mate Delta Goodrem.

Richmond's domestic partner is former Sparkadia guitarist Tiffany Preece. The couple have three children, Rocket, Fin and Ochre.
