= The Whitlams =

Australian rock band

- The Whitlams in 2016. L–R: Warwick Hornby, Terepai Richmond, Jak Housden, Tim Freedman

Background information
- Origin: Sydney, New South Wales, Australia
- Genres: Indie rock, jazz, piano rock, pop
- Years active: 1992–2011, 2013–present
- Labels: Black Yak/Phantom; MDS; EastWest; Warner
- Spinoffs: The Whitlams Black Stump
- Spinoff of: The Plunderers; Olive Branch; Penguins on Safari; The New Christs
- Members: Tim Freedman; Jak Housden; Terepai Richmond; Ian Peres
- Past members: See Band members
- Website: thewhitlams.com

The Whitlams are an Australian Indie rock band formed in late 1992. The original line-up was Tim Freedman on keyboards and lead vocals, Andy Lewis on double bass and Stevie Plunder on guitar and lead vocals. Other than mainstay Freedman, the line-up has changed numerous times. From 2001 to 2022, he was joined by Warwick Hornby on bass guitar, Jak Housden on guitar and Terepai Richmond on drums – forming the band's longest-lasting and best-known line-up. Four of their studio albums have reached the ARIA Albums Chart top 20: Eternal Nightcap (September 1997, No. 14), Love This City (November 1999, No. 3), Torch the Moon (July 2002, No. 1) and Little Cloud (March 2006, No. 4). Their highest-charting singles are "Blow Up the Pokies" (May 2000) and "Fall for You" (June 2002) – both reached number 21. The group's single, "No Aphrodisiac" was listed at number one on the Triple J Hottest 100, 1997 by listeners of national radio station, Triple J. In January 1996 Stevie Plunder was found dead at the base of Wentworth Falls. Andy Lewis died in February 2000.

== History ==
=== 1992–1995: Formation and early years ===
The Whitlams (1992, left to right): Tim Freedman, Andy Lewis and Stevie Plunder

Tim Freedman (ex-Penguin on Safari, Olive Branch) and Anthony Hayes a.k.a. Stevie Plunder (ex-the Plunderers, New Christs) met at the Big Day Out Sydney concert in January 1992. While missing Nirvana performing inside the arena, the two planned to form a group. The Whitlams were formed as a pop band by September that year, with Freedman on keyboards and lead vocals, Andy Lewis on double bass (also ex-The Plunderers, The Gadflys, Olive Branch) and Plunder on guitar. Freedman named the band after the former Prime Minister of Australia, Gough Whitlam, although Plunder had sought to call themselves, 'The Three Nice Boys'. According to Freedman "I loved the family names—the Smiths, the Reivers. I thought, the Whitlams, no-one's done that. I'll be able to steal all the goodwill that Australia holds in reserve for Gough Whitlam." Initially, without a drummer, the band developed their material acoustically at the Sandringham Hotel, Newtown. Australian music critic, Ed Nimmervoll, felt that they were "a sideline band formed by two Sydney songwriters in search of a bit of extra action." In December 1992 they played a gig in Canberra supporting the Gadflys.

This line-up released their debut album, Introducing the Whitlams, in August 1993 on Black Yak/Phantom Records. The album was recorded in January and March 1993 at the Skyhigh Studios in Newcastle; for the recording sessions they used Louis Burdett and Nick Cecire on drums, with Rob Taylor producing. The album features a mix of original and cover songs, including tracks written by Justin Hayes a.k.a. Stanley Claret (Plunder's brother). The album comprises three studio tracks, five live takes and two songs from their first demo, including a tribute song to the band's namesake, "Gough", which was written by Freedman. The lead single, "Woody", detailed Woody Allen's break up with Mia Farrow and was followed by their second single, "Gough". Plunder described their sound to Naomi Mapstone of The Canberra Times, "There'd been lots of rap and lots of thrash and that's all very good, but we just have a different style of music and I think people appreciated hearing something a bit different [... it's] sort of happy, sensitive, not that loud... much more acoustic." The Canberra Times' reporter, Nicole Leedham felt it was "sublime and ridiculous, the band's bluesy, country, jazzy, punky, folky pop swings from bleeding sensitivity to drunken hilarity." Oz Music Project described the album as being "very different to later recordings, with the band sounding a little bit country and a little bit rock and roll. A far cry from the lush orchestration of recent recordings."

Stuart Eadie (The Clouds, Olive Branch) became the band's first permanent drummer. During 1993 to 1994 they performed over 300 shows along the Australian east coast. At first they travelled in Freedman's Holden Kingswood station wagon before using a tour bus, which was used for the 1994 feature film, Priscilla, Queen of the Desert. The group recorded their second album, Undeniably the Whitlams, from April to May 1994 at the 48V Studio in Sydney, with Taylor and Freedman co-producing. The songwriting for the album was shared between Freedman and Plunder, with significant contributions by Lewis. It was released by Black Yak/Phantom in February 1995 and sold approximately 8,000 copies. Ahead of the album, in October 1994, they issued a single, "Met My Match". Late that year Lewis had left to return to the Gadflys, with Mike Vidale brought in as his replacement. Their next single, "I Make Hamburgers", was released in October 1995 and received airplay on national radio stations, including Triple J.

=== 1996–2000: Eternal Nightcap and Love This City ===
The Whitlams' "I Make Hamburgers" was listed on the Triple J Hottest 100, 1996 on Australia Day (26 January). That same day, Stevie Plunder was found dead at the base of Wentworth Falls; according to Nimmervoll, he was "either the victim of suicide, or of an accidental fall after a night out." The death of Plunder was the make it or break it moment for the band. After several months Freedman reformed the Whitlams with new members; another round of line-up changes occurred later in that year. In August 1996 they issued a nine-track live EP, Stupor Ego, with material recorded from performances at the Harbourside Brasserie in mid-1994 and at Goosens Hall on 30 July 1995 (part of national radio station Triple J's 'Real Appeal' broadcast), with the earlier three-piece line-up of Freedman, Lewis and Plunder.

The Whitlams recorded their third album, Eternal Nightcap, with Freedman and Taylor co-producing. Freedman "chose musicians to fit each song, rather than have the same band through the whole album." The album was recorded on an extremely limited budget of $18,000. In a later interview Freedman reflects "The band became a revolving door because I had no money to pay anyone. I actually made the album, Eternal Nightcap, during that most difficult period, that was a really tough year in which to keep my focus and keep my head up, but it ended in September 1997 when I put the record out, and it just started selling itself." Jonathan Lewis of AllMusic described it as being " full of gentle, well-crafted, piano-driven pop songs." Singles from the album include "You Sound Like Louis Burdett" (May 1997), "Melbourne" (January 1998) and "No Aphrodisiac" (February).

"No Aphrodisiac" was released independently by Freedman's own label, had no film clip, no commercial radio airplay and no marketing budget however it reached the top 60 on the ARIA Singles Chart, and top 50 in New Zealand. "No Aphrodisiac" sold more than 80,000 copies and was listed at number one in the Triple J Hottest 100, 1997. The success of the single translated into sales of over 200,000 copies of the album, with it peaking at No. 14 on the ARIA Albums Chart in February 1998. At the ARIA Music Awards of 1998 The Whitlams won Best Independent Release (for Eternal Nightcap), Song of the Year (for "No Aphrodisiac") and Best Group. The 'Best Group' award was presented by Gough Whitlam, who announced the winners as "It's my family". At the conclusion of the ARIA Awards ceremony the Whitlams performed a cover of the Skyhooks' "Women in Uniform", this was subsequently released in March 1999 as a limited edition single. In mid-1999 the group signed a distribution deal with Warner Music Australasia, and toured Canada.

The group's fourth studio album, Love This City, was released in November 1999, which peaked at No. 3 on the ARIA Albums Chart. It was recorded with the line-up of Freedman with Ben Fink on guitar, Bill Heckenberg on drums and Cottco Lovett on bass guitar, together with a large cast of guest musicians including Marcia Hines, Jackie Orszaczky, Chris Abrahams, Garry Gary Beers and members of Machine Gun Fellatio. The album had four producers: Freedman, Taylor, Daniel Denholm and Joe Hardy and was recorded in Sydney and Memphis (a reflection of the considerably larger budget that Freedman had to work with). The three singles from the album "Thank You (For Loving Me at My Worst)" (January 2000), "Blow Up the Pokies" (May) and "Made Me Hard" (September 2001) all charted in the top 100 singles charts in Australia. "Blow Up the Pokies" was their highest-charting single – it peaked at No. 21.

AllMusic's Jonathan Lewis compared Love This City to their previous album, "this disc is less cohesive, covering a wide range of subject matter. The song style is different here, too, as Freedman allows his piano to take a back seat to guitars or brass on a number of tracks. The city of the title is Sydney, and many of these songs relate to its changing face." He described "You Gotta Love This City" as "less-than-complimentary reaction to the commercialism of the Olympic Games" and "Blow Up the Pokies" as detailing the "infiltration of gambling machines (pokies) into suburban bars and clubs." Freedman had found himself frustrated that the venues he performed at were replacing live music for pokies, writing the song in response. Nimmervoll described how the album "was again recorded in a number of studios, with a changed line-up, leaning on the same and new songwriting collaborations. It couldn't match the emotional charge that came with Eternal Nightcap but did enough to ensure The Whitlams' survival."

Former founding member, Andy Lewis committed suicide in Sydney in February 2000, after losing a weeks wage to pokies. A month after Lewis' death a benefit concert was held at the Metro club in Sydney to raise money for his wife and child. The event was hosted by Paul McDermott, Mikey Robins and Steve Abbott (The Sandman), and performers included Max Sharam, and The Gadflys. During the Whitlam's Canadian tour in April, supporting Blue Rodeo, they received word that Lewis was dead. "Blow Up the Pokies" had been co-written by Freedman and Greta Gertler before Lewis' death – as a statement about the destruction in Lewis' life due to gambling. Freedman wrote "The Curse Stops Here" to describe being the 'last one' of the original line-up and voicing his determination to survive. "The Curse Stops Here" was included as a B-side track on the single version of "Blow Up the Pokies".

During the broadcast of the 2000 Sydney Olympics in September, the Whitlams' track, "Sydney 2000 Olympic Theme", was played – it is a B-side from their 1995 single, "I Make Hamburgers". The track was reworked as "You Gotta Love This City" on Love This City. Its choice for the Sydney Olympics is an irony, as the song's protagonist commits suicide by jumping in the Harbour at the end of the song, disgusted at the city's crass pursuit of money: It dawns on him / The horror / We got the Olympic Games.

=== 2001–2006: Torch the Moon and Little Cloud ===
Torch the Moon, the Whitlams' fifth studio album, was released in July 2002, which debuted at No. 1. ARIA Reported that the group are "one of the great underdog success stories of recent Aussie rock history, [they] have immortalized themselves, by becoming the latest Australian act to debut at # 1." For the album the line-up were Freedman with Warwick Hornby on bass guitar (ex-Max Sharam, Paul Mac), Jak Housden (ex-the Badloves) on guitar and Terepai Richmond (dig, Tina Arena) on drums. The producers were Denholm and Atomica. Clayton Bolger of AllMusic described the "strong album from a promising lineup" which "only falls when the band significantly stray from their classic rock/pop sound."

It provided the singles "Fall for You" (June 2002, which became their equal highest single at No. 21), "Best Work" (September, No. 35), "Royal in the Afternoon" (July 2003, No. 66) and their cover version of Icehouse's "Don't Believe Anymore" (February, No. 47) with video directed by Ryan Renshaw. Another track on the album, "I Will not Go Quietly (Duffy's Song)", had been written and performed by Freedman for the Australian TV series, Love Is a Four Letter Word, "Episode 21: Oval" (June 2001).

The band's sixth studio album, Little Cloud (consisting of two CDs: Little Cloud and The Apple's Eye), was released on 19 March 2006 in Australia, which peaked at No. 4. Ian Hockley of Beyond the Pale website described the "return to basics with few overdubs and often just a voice and piano base" where the first disc "deals with John Howard's re-election and the bleak feelings that event engendered" and the second one "is more hopeful and life-affirming with bigger, more elaborate productions." Several tracks received considerable airplay, including "I Was Alive". Three of the songs on the album have been released as radio-only singles, with a fourth, "Beautiful as You", released as a CD single.

The album was followed up with almost non-stop touring around Australia, including performances at political and university events. Freedman released Little Cloud outside Australia under his own name. The band made the news in September 2006 when, for political reasons, Freedman refused to perform to troops in Iraq, he told Peter Holmes of The Sunday Telegraph, "I was asked, and decided not to go. ... I went to East Timor and enjoyed the experience. I understand how hard the soldiers do it. In this instance, I don't agree with the war."

=== 2007–2010: Sydney Symphony to Truth, Beauty and a Picture of You ===
The Whitlams performed an orchestral tour from September to November 2007, performing shows with the Sydney Symphony, the Adelaide Symphony Orchestra, the West Australian Symphony Orchestra and The Queensland Orchestra. In mid-2008 they gave away 700,000 copies of The Whitlams & The Sydney Symphony Live in Concert, as a free CD with various newspapers: The Sunday Telegraph (1 June), The Australian (26 July) and The Mercury. It contains material from their four live performances with the Sydney Symphony at the Sydney Opera House in the previous September.

The Whitlams released a compilation album, Truth, Beauty and a Picture of You in August 2008, which peaked at No. 3. As part of it promotion the group performed on TV programs including Nine's Footy Show (NRL), Seven's Sunrise and The Morning Show. The Whitlams performed with the Sydney Symphony in 2009 to celebrate the 12th anniversary of the release of their breakthrough album, Eternal Nightcap.

=== 2011–2016: Australian Idle ===
From 2011 to 2013 the Whitlams were on hiatus. On 11 November 2011 (the anniversary of Gough Whitlam's dismissal), Freedman released a solo album, Australian Idle, which featured his new backing band The Idle. The line-up was Heath Cullen on guitar, Zoe Hauptmann on bass guitar, Dave Hibbard on drums and Amy Vee on guitar and keyboards. The Whitlams reunited in 2013, with a performance schedule reduced to around four weeks each year. They performed an outdoor concert with West Australian artist, Jason Ayres, in March 2015 at the Mundaring Weir Hotel

=== 2017–present: Anniversary tours, Sancho, Hornby's departure and Kookaburra ===
To celebrate the 25th anniversary of the band, the Whitlams performed six shows with the symphony orchestras of each capital city in Australia for an Anniversary tour. Taking place in April and May 2017, the tour visited Brisbane, Melbourne, Sydney, Perth, Canberra and Adelaide. In each city, they were backed by a 50-piece orchestra using performers from each city. Tim Freedman said that "It is an honour to play with these musicians who in some cases have been playing their instruments since they were in the womb."

In 2020, the band released their first new song in almost 15 years, "Ballad of Bertie Kidd". The six-minute song was written from the perspective of a would-be criminal, enlisted by Kidd for an art gallery heist in Gosford. The single was later revealed to be the lead single from the band's seventh album, Sancho, which was released on 28 January 2022. A further four singles were released from the album: "Man About a Dog", "(You're Making Me Feel Like I'm) 50 Again", "Cambridge Three" and "Nobody Knows I Love You".

In April 2022, Freedman launched a country music off-shoot of the band, billed as The Whitlams Black Stump Band. The band is composed of Freedman, Richmond, banjo player Rod McCormack, pedal steel player Ollie Thorpe and bassist Matt Fell. Freedman began the project after discovering that "Man About a Dog" had been added to country radio. A new version of "No Aphrodisiac" by the Black Stump Band was released in July.

In June 2022, the band announced a 25th anniversary tour for Eternal Nightcap. With the announcement came the band's first line-up change since 2001: the departure of bassist Warwick Hornby, who was replaced by Sancho session bassist Ian Peres. In a statement shared to the band's social media, Freedman confirmed that Hornby had retired:

We would like to announce the retirement from live performance of our rock on the bass Warwick Hornby, who joined The Whitlams at the same time as Terepai in 1999. Warwick is seeking more of the quiet life on the couch with his bulging vinyl collection, [or] on the golf course with his two wood, and is looking forward to watching the band live for the first time this September at The Enmore Theatre. Look for him in the stalls. Thanks for all the good times Waz, and for all the memories from London to Montreal, and New York to Broome.

In May 2023, the band announced a national tour for October that saw them focus on the early years of The Whitlams' material, between 1993 and 1997. To replicate the sound of these albums, the band was joined by double bassist Scott Owen of The Living End.

In February 2024, it was announced that The Whitlams Black Stump Band had changed its name to The Whitlams Black Stump, and would release the album Kookaburra in March 2024.

== Band members ==
=== Current members ===
- Tim Freedman – lead vocals, piano, keyboards (1991–2011, 2013–present)
- Terepai Richmond – drums, backing vocals (1999–2011, 2013–present)
- Jak Housden – guitar, backing vocals (2001–2011, 2013–present)
- Ian Peres – bass, keyboards, backing vocals (2022–present)

=== Former members ===
- Stevie Plunder – guitar, lead vocals (1991–1996; died 1996)
- Andy Lewis – double bass, backing vocals (1991–1994, 1996; died 2000)
- Stu Eadie – drums (1993–1994)
- Michael Vidale – bass (1994–1996, 1996–1997)
- Louis Burdett – drums (1994–1995)
- Hanuman Daas – drums (1995)
- Michael Richards – drums (1995–1996)
- Oscar Briz – guitar (1996)
- Tim Hall – guitar, backing and occasional lead vocals (1996–1997)
- Bill Heckenberg – drums (1996–1999)
- Chris Abrahams – keyboards (1996–1998)
- Ben Fink – guitar (1997–2001)
- Cottco Lovett – bass (1997–1998)
- Clayton Doley – keyboards (1998–1999)
- Alex Hewitson – bass (1999)
- Mike Gubb – keyboards (1999–2002)
- Warwick Hornby – bass, backing vocals (1999–2011, 2013–2022)

=== Former touring musicians ===
- Scott Owen – double bass, backing vocals (2023–2024)
- Matt Fell – bass, backing vocals (2025–2026; substitute for Ian Peres)

== Discography ==
as The Whitlams

- Introducing The Whitlams (1993)
- Undeniably The Whitlams (1995)
- Eternal Nightcap (1997)
- Love This City (1999)
- Torch the Moon (2002)
- Little Cloud (2006)
- Sancho (2022)

as The Whitlams Black Stump

- Kookaburra (2024)

== Awards and nominations ==
=== AIR Awards ===
The Australian Independent Record Awards (commonly known informally as AIR Awards) is an annual awards night to recognise, promote and celebrate the success of Australia's Independent Music sector.

Year	Nominee / work	Award	Result	Ref.
2025	Kookaburra (as The Whitlams Black Stump)	Best Independent Country Album or EP	Nominated	

=== APRA Music Awards ===
The APRA Awards are held in Australia and New Zealand by the Australasian Performing Right Association to recognise songwriting skills, sales and airplay performance by its members annually.

Year	Nominated work	Award	Result	Ref.
1998	"No Aphrodisiac"	Song of the Year	Nominated	

=== ARIA Music Awards ===
The ARIA Music Awards is an annual awards ceremony that recognises excellence, innovation, and achievement across all genres of Australian music. The Whitlams have won three ARIA Music Awards from fourteen nominations.

Year	Nominated work	Award	Result	Ref.
1998	"No Aphrodisiac"	Single of the Year	Nominated	
1998	"No Aphrodisiac"	Song of the Year	Won	
1998	Eternal Nightcap	Album of the Year	Nominated	
1998	Eternal Nightcap	Best Independent Release	Won	
1998	Eternal Nightcap	Best Pop Release	Nominated	
1998	Eternal Nightcap	Best Group	Won	
1998	Eternal Nightcap – Rob Taylor, Tim Freedman	Producer of the Year	Nominated	
1998	Eternal Nightcap – Rob Taylor	Engineer of the Year	Nominated	
2000	Love This City – Rob Taylor, Tim Freedman	Producer of the Year	Nominated	
2002	Torch the Moon	Best Pop Release	Nominated	
2002	Torch the Moon – Daniel Denholm	Producer of the Year	Nominated	
2002	Torch the Moon – Daniel Denholm	Engineer of the Year	Nominated	
2002	Torch the Moon – Art of the State, Scott James Smith	Best Cover Art	Nominated	
2006	Little Cloud	Best Adult Contemporary Album	Nominated	

=== Helpmann Awards ===
The Helpmann Awards is an awards show, celebrating live entertainment and performing arts in Australia, presented by industry group Live Performance Australia since 2001. Note: 2020 and 2021 were cancelled due to the COVID-19 pandemic.

Year	Nominee / work	Award	Result	Ref.
2008	The Whitlams with the Sydney Symphony	Best Performance in an Australian Contemporary Concert	Nominated	

=== Mo Awards ===
The Australian Entertainment Mo Awards (commonly known informally as the Mo Awards), were annual Australian entertainment industry awards. They recognise achievements in live entertainment in Australia from 1975 to 2016. The Whitlams won one award in that time.

Year	Nominee / work	Award	Result (wins only)
1997	The Whitlams	Rock Performer of the Year	Won

=== Triple J ===
The Triple J Hottest 100 is an annual music listener poll hosted by the publicly funded, national Australian youth radio station, Triple J.

Triple J Hottest 100

Year	Work	Position	Ref.
1996	"I Make Hamburgers"	79	
1997	"You Sound Like Louis Burdett"	53	
1997	"No Aphrodisiac"	1	
1998	"Buy Now Pay Later (Charlie No. 2)"	37	
1998	"Melbourne"	43	
1998	"Charlie No. 3"	56	
1999	"Chunky Chunky Air Guitar"	38	
1999	"Thank You (for Loving Me at My Worst)"	54	
2000	"Thank You (for Loving Me at My Worst)"	37	
2001	"Duffy's Song (I Will not Go Quietly)"	42	
2002	"Fall for You"	40	

Triple J Hottest 100 of All Time

Year	Work	Position	Ref.
1998	"No Aphrodisiac"	36	
1998	"You Sound Like Louis Burdett"	43	
