= Torch the Moon =

Studio album by The Whitlams
- Released: 22 July 2002
- Recorded: 2001–2002
- Genre: Pop
- Length: 49:58
- Label: Black Yak / Warner
- Producer: Daniel Denholm

The Whitlams chronology
Love This City (1999)	Torch the Moon (2002)	Little Cloud (2006)

Alternative Covers

Singles from Torch the Moon
- 1. "Fall For You" Released: 17 June 2002; 2. "Best Work" Released: 9 September 2002; 3. "Royal in the Afternoon" Released: February 2003; 4. "Don't Believe Anymore" Released: June 2003

Professional ratings
Review scores
Source	Rating
Allmusic	3.5/5 stars

Torch the Moon is the fifth studio album by Australian band The Whitlams, released by Black Yak through Warner in 2002. It peaked at number one on the ARIA Albums Chart. It received platinum album certification from ARIA.

== Track listing ==
All tracks written by Tim Freedman, unless otherwise noted.

1. "Cries Too Hard" – 4:11
2. "Fall for You" (Freedman, D. Denholm) – 3:47
3. "The Lights Are Back On" – 3:44
4. "I Will Not Go Quietly (Duffy's Song)" (Freedman, J. Willing) – 3:53
5. "Kate Kelly" – 4:18
6. "Royal in the Afternoon" – 2:58
7. "Gone Surfing" (Freedman, J. Housden, T. Richmond, W. Hornby) – 2:12
8. "Best Work" (Freedman, B. Fink, N. Freedman) – 4:33
9. "Start My Cellar Again" – 4:08
10. "Coming Over" (Freedman, W. Hornby) – 4:26
11. "Out the Back" – 4:31
12. "Breathing You In" – 2:56
13. "Ease of the Midnight Visit" – 4:20

== Re-releases ==
Initial prints of Torch the Moon contained a second CD, entitled Side 4. The track list contained:

1. "Don't Believe Anymore" – 5:22
2. "Last Life" – 4:45
3. "Witness Protection Scheme" – 3:52
4. "Back into the Wild" – 3:40
5. "Still in Love with You" – 3:23

A second print of the CD was released with the initial track listing, as well as "Don't Believe Anymore" (a cover of a track from Icehouse's 1984 album Sidewalk) and "Last Life".

A third release of the CD saw the thirteen initial tracks included, but none of the tracks from Side 4.

Finally, a fourth print of the CD saw a combination of the fifteen-track release as well as an exclusive 'Rarities' CD, collecting B-sides and unreleased tracks from the last nine years. The track list ran as follows:

1. "The Curse Stops Here" – 3:37
2. "Where Is She? (Demo)" – 4:28
3. "Tiny Girls" – 2:50
4. "Buy Now Pay Later (Charlie No. 2) (Live)" – 4:53
5. "Bring Me Back to Your Love (Full Band Version)" – 4:05
6. "Coming up for Air" – 3:46
7. "Fall for You (Perky Mix)" – 3:36
8. "Never Fall in Love Again" – 3:36
9. "No Aphrodisiac (MGF Remix)" – 4:22
10. "400 Miles from Darwin (Demo)" – 3:20
11. "Out the Back (Sculthorpe Variation)" – 9:43
12. "I Make Hamburgers (Live Remix)" – 3:01

== Personnel ==
- Tim Freedman – Piano, Vocals, Backing Vocals
- Jak Housden – Guitar, Backing Vocals
- Terepai Richmond – Drums, Percussion
- Warwick Hornby – Bass
- Daniel Denholm – Strings
- Emma-Jane Murphy, Melissa Barnard, Peter Morrison – Cello
- Caroline Henbest – Viola
- Aiko Goto, Doreen Cumming, Elizabeth Jones, Helena Rathbone, Jun Yi Ma, Naomi Radom – Violin

== Charts ==
=== Weekly charts ===
Chart (2002–03)	Peak position
Australian Albums (ARIA)	1

=== Year-end chart ===
Chart (2002)	Position
Australian (ARIA Charts)	49

== Certifications ==
Region	Certification	Certified units/sales
Australia (ARIA)	Platinum	70,000^{^}
^{^} Shipments figures based on certification alone.

== In popular culture ==
The first verse of "Kate Kelly", a song about Kate Kelly, younger sister of Ned Kelly, may have inspired Australian author David Hunt in his 2016 book "True Girt: The Unauthorised History of Australia, Volume 2" in which he also describes Joe Byrne as having been "strung up" like a "marionette".
