= Eternal Nightcap =

Studio album by The Whitlams
- Released: 8 September 1997
- Recorded: 1996–1997
- Genre: Piano rock, alternative rock
- Length: 54:39
- Label: Black Yak Phantom
- Producer: Tim Freedman, Rob Taylor

The Whitlams chronology
| Stupor Ego (1996) | Eternal Nightcap (1997) | Love This City (1999) |

Singles from Eternal Nightcap
- 1. "You Sound Like Louis Burdett" Released: 11 January 1997; 2. "No Aphrodisiac" Released: December 1997; 3. "Melbourne" Released: January 1998

Eternal Nightcap is the third studio album by Australian rock band The Whitlams, first released by Black Yak Phantom in September 1997. The album peaked at number 14 on the ARIA charts and was certified gold, and then triple platinum.

Single No Aphrodisiac was voted number 1 on the Triple J Hottest 100 in January 1997 and won Song of the Year at the 12th Annual ARIA Music Awards in 1998. Eternal Nightcap won Best Independent Release, and The Whitlams won Best Group. The band toured in support of the album and played 150 dates on the Learning Your ABC's National Tour presented by Triple J, Recovery and Rage.

A limited edition vinyl LP of Eternal Nightcap was released in 2006, with only 500 copies being pressed. Notably, "Love is Everywhere" and "Tangled Up in Blue" were left off this version of the album.

On 6 August 2009, The Whitlams played Eternal Nightcap in its entirety for the first time, with the exclusion of "Tangled Up in Blue", at the Karova Lounge in Ballarat. In August 2009, they played the entire album in full before moving on to various other hits, first at the Corner Hotel in Richmond, Melbourne and then at The Tivoli in Fortitude Valley, Brisbane.

In September 2022 the band embarked on the Eternal Nightcap: 25th Anniversary Tour across Australia and released a remastered version of the album. The 2022 re-release was baked and extracted from original half-inch tapes. The 2022 vinyl release of the album included all tracks except "Life's a Beach".

== Critical reception ==
Professional ratings
Review scores
| Source | Rating |
|---|---|
| AllMusic | 4.5/5 stars |

Critics praised the band's unique pop – rock style as an impressive step up from their last album, Undeniably The Whitlams. The album not only achieved critical acclaim but also commercial success as it became the biggest selling independent album in Australian history. On 3 December 2006, it was announced that Eternal Nightcap was voted number 27 in ABC's list, Australia's Favourite Album. Eternal Nightcap was also placed at number 17 in the Triple J Hottest 100 Australian Albums of All Time, 2011.

== Reissues ==
=== New Zealand ===
Eternal Nightcap – New Zealand Release was the first album released by The Whitlams specifically for a country other than Australia. Eternal Nightcap – New Zealand Release contained 17 tracks selected from the band's first three studio albums: Introducing The Whitlams, Undeniably The Whitlams and Eternal Nightcap. The album was released by Black Yak Phantom in 1999, and includes many former singles and B-sides from the first three albums including "You Sound Like Louis Burdett", "No Aphrodisiac", "Charlie" Nos. 1–3, "Melbourne" and "Following My Own Tracks".

=== Canadian ===
Eternal Nightcap – Canadian Release was the second album released by The Whitlams specifically for a country other than Australia. Eternal Nightcap – Canadian Release contains 13 tracks selected from two of their studio albums, Eternal Nightcap and Undeniably The Whitlams – Reworked. This album was released by Black Yak Phantom/Warner Music Canada in 2000, coinciding with The Whitlams Canadian tour supporting Blue Rodeo.

It consists mostly of tracks from the Australian release of Eternal Nightcap, along with some 4-tracks from Undeniably The Whitlams - Reworked, and the track "1999", a remix of the track "1995" which was first released on Undeniably The Whitlams. "1999" was also released on the FOW Exclusive CD, available only to members of the Friends of The Whitlams, the band's official fanclub.

== Track listing ==
All tracks written by Tim Freedman, unless otherwise noted.

1. "No Aphrodisiac" (Freedman, G. Dormand, M. Ford) – 4:19
2. "Buy Now Pay Later (Charlie No. 2)" – 3:46
3. "Love Is Everywhere" – 4:01
4. "You Sound Like Louis Burdett" (Freedman, M. Wells) – 4:01
5. "Melbourne" – 4:50
6. "Where's the Enemy?" (Tim Hall) – 4:09
7. "Charlie No. 3" (Freedman, G. Gertler) – 4:23
8. "Life's a Beach" – 3:39
9. "Tangled Up in Blue" (Bob Dylan) – 5:39
10. "Laugh in Their Faces" – 4:13
11. "Charlie No. 1" – 3:10
12. "Up Against the Wall" – 5:28
13. "Band on Every Corner" – 2:53

== Personnel ==
- Tim Freedman – piano, vocals, backing vocals
- Tim Hall – guitar, vocals, backing vocals, trebley wah guitar
- Andy Lewis – bass, double bass
- Oscar Briz
- Bernie Hayes
- Matt Galvin
- Nick Freedman
- Ian Hildebrand
- Chris Abrahams
- Larry Muhoberac
- Cottco Lovett
- Michael Vidale
- Mike Richards
- Stuart Eadie
- Scott Johnson
- Steph Miller
- Greta Gertler
- Robert Hindley
- FourPlay Electric String Quartet
- Paul Jensen
- Andy Kell
- Daniel Barnett
- Bill Heckenberg

== Awards and nominations ==
=== Awards ===
- 1997 Triple J Hottest 100 Winner, for "No Aphrodisiac"
- 1998 ARIA Awards, Song of the Year for "No Aphrodisiac"
- 1998 ARIA Awards, Best Independent Release
- 1998 ARIA Awards, Best Group
  - This award was personally presented to the band by the man they named themselves after, Gough Whitlam.

=== Nominations ===
- 1998 ARIA Awards, Album of the Year
- 1998 ARIA Awards, Single of the Year for "No Aphrodisiac"
- 1998 ARIA Awards, Best Pop Release
- 1998 ARIA Awards, Producer of the Year
- 1998 ARIA Awards, Engineer of the Year

== Charts ==
=== Weekly charts ===
| Chart (1997–1998) | Peak position |
|---|---|
| Australian Albums (ARIA) | 14 |

=== Year-end charts ===
| Chart (1997) | Position |
|---|---|
| Australian Albums (ARIA) | 97 |
| Chart (1998) | Position |
| Australian Albums (ARIA) | 23 |

== Certifications ==
| Region | Certification | Certified units/sales |
|---|---|---|
| Australia (ARIA) | Gold | 35,000^{^} |
^{^} Shipments figures based on certification alone.
