= Love This City =

Studio album by The Whitlams
- Released: 1 November 1999
- Recorded: 1999
- Genre: Pop
- Length: 54:49
- Label: Black Yak / Warner
- Producer: Rob Taylor / Daniel Denholm

The Whitlams chronology
Eternal Nightcap (1997)	Love This City (1999)	Torch the Moon (2002)

Singles from Love This City
- 1. "Thank You (For Loving Me at My Worst)" Released: 10 January 2000; 2. "Blow Up the Pokies" Released: 29 May 2000; 3. "Made Me Hard" Released: May 2001

Love This City is the fourth studio album by Australian band The Whitlams, released by Black Yak through Warner in 1999. It peaked at No. 3 on the ARIA Albums Chart.

Professional ratings
Review scores
Source	Rating
AllMusic	4.5/5 stars

== Track listing ==
1. "Make the World Safe" – 3:43
2. "Thank You (for Loving Me at My Worst)" – 3:59
3. "Chunky Chunky Air Guitar" – 3:04
4. "Pretty as You" – 4:48
5. "You Gotta Love This City" – 5:11
6. "God Drinks at the Sando" – 2:53
7. "Blow Up the Pokies" – 3:27
8. "400 Miles from Darwin" – 3:37
9. "Time" – 3:32
10. "Made Me Hard" – 3:34
11. "High Ground" – 3:46
12. "Unreliable" – 2:29
13. "Her Floor Is My Ceiling" – 5:51
14. "There's No One" – 5:05

== Charts ==
=== Weekly charts ===
Chart (1999)	Peak position
Australian Albums (ARIA)	3

=== Year-end charts ===
Chart (1999)	Position
Australian Albums (ARIA)	69
Chart (2000)	Position
Australian Albums (ARIA)	85

== Certifications ==
Region	Certification	Certified units/sales
Australia (ARIA)	2× Platinum	140,000^{^}
^{^} Shipments figures based on certification alone.
