= Tim Freedman =

Australian musician (born 1964)

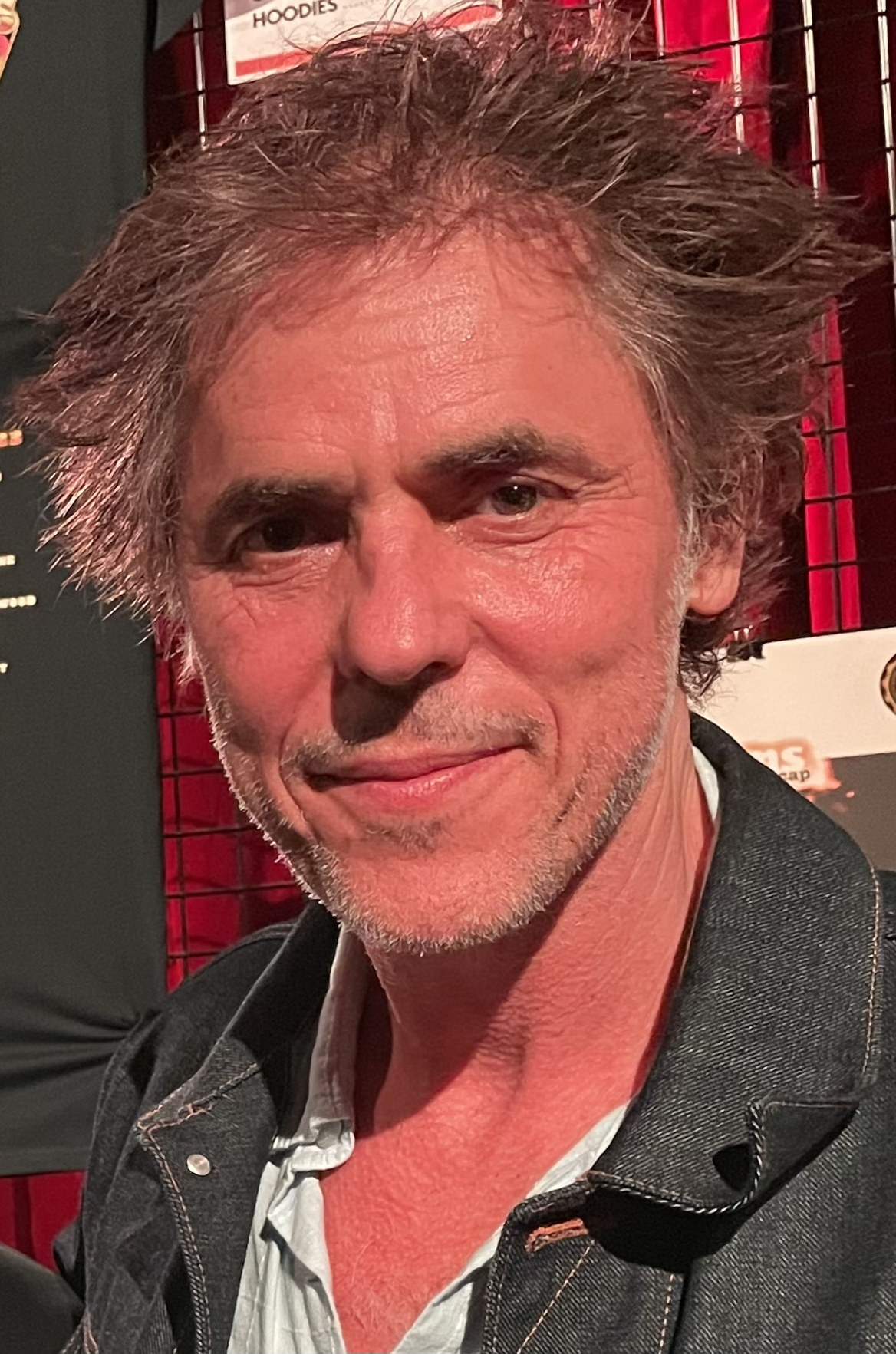
- Freedman in 2023

Background information
- Born: Timothy James Freedman; 25 November 1964 (age 61); Sydney, New South Wales, Australia
- Genres: Rock; pop; alternative rock; indie pop; ska
- Occupations: Singer; songwriter
- Instruments: Vocals; piano
- Years active: 1986–present
- Labels: E.G. Records, Sony Music Australia

Timothy James Freedman (25 November 1964) is an Australian musician, best known as the mainstay lead singer and keyboardist of the Australian band The Whitlams formed in 1993. The song "No Aphrodisiac", co-written by Freedman, was their breakthrough hit in 1997; their top four ARIA albums by sales are Love This City (1999), Torch the Moon (2002), Little Cloud (2006), and their compilation album Truth, Beauty and a Picture of You: Best of the Whitlams in 2008.

A highlight of his career was receiving an ARIA Music Award for 'Song of the Year' in 1998 from the former Australian prime minister Gough Whitlam—after whom his band is named.

== Biography ==
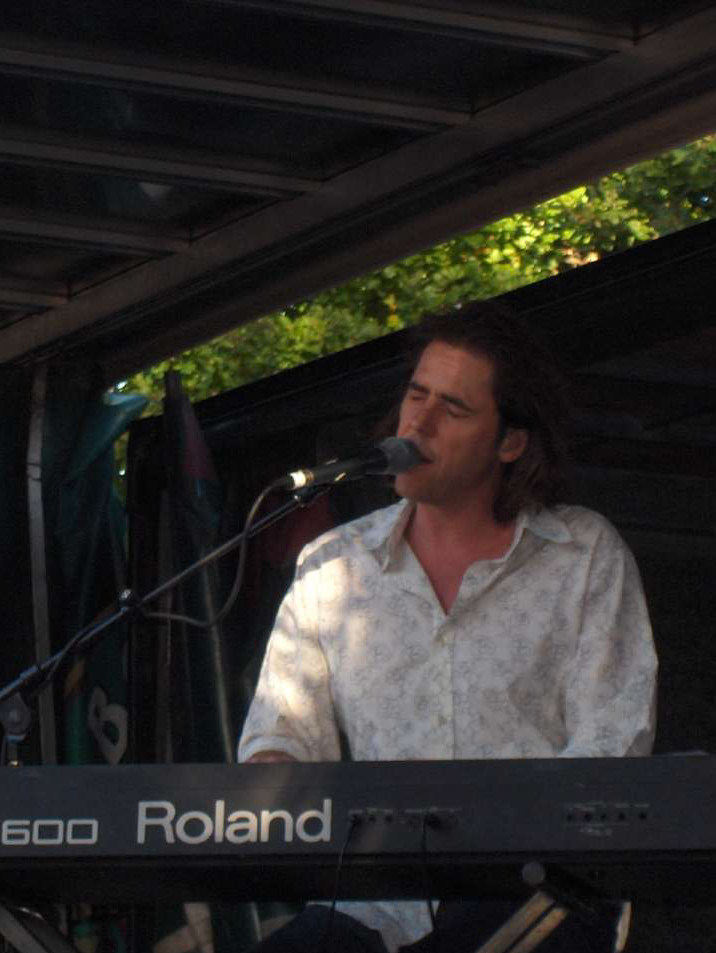
Freedman performing in 2006

Tim Freedman was born in 1964 in Sydney and was raised in Collaroy, in Sydney's Northern Beaches region, and was educated at the Shore School in North Sydney. Prior to co-founding The Whitlams, Freedman was the front man of ska band Itchy Feet, and later the indie pop bands Penguins on Safari and The Olive Branch. He had stints as sideman with Sunnyboys 1986–87 (who he would later manage), and The Hummingbirds 1989–90.

At the Gimme Ted benefit concert on 10 March 2001, Freedman performed his cover version of two songs, "Julia" and "Falling in Love Again", originally by Ted Mulry. In an interview, which aired on 612 ABC Brisbane on Friday 29 September 2006, Freedman said he became a pianist "by mistake" after quitting law school. He later completed a Bachelor of Arts at The University of Sydney.

In 2014, he started writing as a music critic for a newly founded print and digital newspaper, The Saturday Paper, to help support the paper's growth, which has since grown to a circulation of 900,000 as of 2021.

== Discography ==
=== Solo ===
- Australian Idle (2011)

=== The Whitlams ===
- Introducing The Whitlams (1993)
- Undeniably The Whitlams (1995)
- Eternal Nightcap (1997)
- Love This City (1999)
- Torch the Moon (2002)
- Little Cloud (2006)
- Sancho (2022)

== Personal life ==
Freedman shares two children with basketball player Lauren Jackson. During the 2024 Paris Olympics, Freedman travelled to France to help care for their children, staying at a nearby hotel while Jackson was based in the Olympic Village.
