= The Lemonheads discography =

- Studio albums: 11
- Extended plays: 4
- Live albums: 1
- Compilation albums: 2
- Singles: 18

This is a comprehensive listing of official releases by The Lemonheads.

The Lemonheads are an alternative rock band formed in 1986 in Boston, Massachusetts featuring guitarist, vocalist and songwriter Evan Dando, who is the only original member left in the current Lemonheads line-up. Current members in addition to Dando are Karl Alvarez, Vess Ruhtenberg, Bill Stevenson and Devon Ashley; previous members include original band co-founder Ben Deily, and Juliana Hatfield. The first Lemonheads album, Hate Your Friends, was released in 1987 on punk/underground label Taang! Records. After releasing two more albums in the next two years, both of which performed well on North American college radio, the band parted ways with Taang! and signed to Atlantic in 1990. Over this period, the band's fame rose, as did their charting positions. After the 1996 release of the Car Button Cloth album, The Lemonheads went on an extended hiatus before reuniting in the early 2000s. In their recording career, the band has released eight studio albums, two compilation albums, three extended plays and 15 singles.

NOTE: This list is not intended to include material that members have recorded or performed outside the Lemonheads.

== Studio albums ==
Year	Title	Peak Chart Positions									Certifications (sales thresholds)
Year	Title	US	AUS	BEL	CAN	GER	NED	NZ	SWE	UK	Certifications (sales thresholds)
1987	Hate Your Friends: Released: 1987; Label: Taang!	—	—	—	—	—	—	—	—	—	
1988	Creator: Released: August 1988; Label: Taang!	—	—	—	—	—	—	—	—	—	
1989	Lick: Released: April 1989; Label: Taang!	—	—	—	—	—	—	—	—	—	
1990	Lovey: Released: July 1990; Label: Atlantic	—	118	—	—	—	—	—	—	—	
1992	It's a Shame About Ray: Released: June 2, 1992; Label: Atlantic	68	23	—	31	—	—	—	—	33	US: Gold; AUS: Gold; UK: Gold
1993	Come on Feel the Lemonheads: Released: October 12, 1993; Label: Atlantic	56	19	—	34	—	56	39	26	5	US: Gold; UK: Gold
1996	Car Button Cloth: Released: October 15, 1996; Label: Atlantic	130	36	—	—	—	—	—	54	28	
2006	The Lemonheads: Released: September 26, 2006; Label: Vagrant	—	97	98	—	92	—	—	—	56	
2009	Varshons: Release: June 23, 2009; Label: The End	177	—	—	—	—	—	—	—	106	
2019	Varshons 2: Release: February 8, 2019; Label: Fire Records	—	—	—	—	—	—	—	—	—	
2025	Love Chant: Release: October 24, 2025; Label: Fire Records	—	—	—	—	—	—	—	—	—	

== EPs ==
Year	Title
1986	Laughing All the Way to the Cleaners: Released: August 1986; Label: Amory Arms/Huh-Bag Records (self-released)
1990	Favourite Spanish Dishes: Released: June 1990; Label: Atlantic
1991	Patience and Prudence: Released: September 1991; Label: Atlantic

== Demos ==
Year	Title
2011	Hotel Sessions: Released: November 2011; Label: Cobraside

== Compilations ==
Year	Title
1989	Create Your Friends: Released: July, 1989; Label: Taang!
1998	The Best of The Lemonheads: The Atlantic Years: Released: July 14, 1998; Label: Atlantic
2011	Laughing All the Way to the Cleaners: The Best Of: Released: December 12, 2011; Label: Bertus (H'art) / Music Club Records
2014	If Only You Were Dead: Released: April 19, 2014; Label: Fire Records

== Singles ==
Year	Song	Peak chart positions				Album
Year	Song	US	US Mod	AUS	UK	Album
1989	"Luka"	—	—	—	—	Lick
1990	"Different Drum"	—	—	—	—	Non-album single
1991	"Gonna Get Along Without Ya Now"	—	—	—	—	Non-album single
1992	"It's a Shame About Ray"	—	5	68	31	It's a Shame About Ray
1992	"Mrs. Robinson"	118	8	16	19	It's a Shame About Ray
1993	"My Drug Buddy/Confetti"	—	—	—	44	It's a Shame About Ray
1993	"Into Your Arms"	67	1	46	14	Come on Feel the Lemonheads
1993	"It's About Time"	—	—	98	57	Come on Feel the Lemonheads
1994	"Big Gay Heart"	—	—	—	55	Come on Feel the Lemonheads
1994	"The Great Big No"	—	15	133	—	Come on Feel the Lemonheads
1996	"If I Could Talk I'd Tell You"	—	15	90	39	Car Button Cloth
1996	"It's All True"	—	—	109	61	Car Button Cloth
1997	"The Outdoor Type"	—	—	131	91	Car Button Cloth
1997	"Balancing Act/Galveston"	—	—	—	92	Non-album single
2006	"Become the Enemy"	—	—	—	101	The Lemonheads
2006	"Pittsburgh"	—	—	—	—	The Lemonheads
2009	"I Just Can't Take It Anymore"	—	—	—	—	Varshons
2009	"Hey, That's No Way To Say Goodbye (with Liv Tyler)"	—	—	—	—	Varshons
2013	"Mallo Cup"	—	—	—	—	Lick
2018	"Can't Forget"	—	—	—	—	Varshons II
2018	"Old Man Blank"	—	—	—	—	Varshons II
2019	"Unfamiliar"	—	—	—	—	Varshons II
2023	"Fear Of Living"	—	—	—	—	Non-Album Single
2024	"Seven Out"	—	—	—	—	Non-Album Single
2025	"Deep End"	—	—	—	—	Love Chant
2025	"In the Margin"	—	—	—	—	Love Chant
2025	"The Key of Victory"	—	—	—	—	Love Chant

== Music videos ==
Year	Title	Director
1987	"Second Chance"	
1989	"Luka"	Michael Patterson & Candice Reckinge
1989	"Mallo Cup"	
1990	"Half the Time"	
1992	"It's a Shame About Ray"	
1992	"Mrs. Robinson"	Jesse Peretz
1992	"Rockin Stroll"	
1992	"My Drug Buddy"	
1993	"Confetti"	
1993	"Hannah & Gabi"	
1993	"Into Your Arms"	
1993	"It's About Time"	Tamra Davis
1994	"Big Gay Heart"	
1994	"The Great Big No"	
1994	"Being Around"	
1996	"If I Could Talk I'd Tell You"	
2025	"Deep End"	Luigi Parisi & Carlao Busato
2025	"In the Margin" (Official Lyric Video)	Antonia Teixeira
2025	"The Key of Victory"	Slick Jim

== Tribute albums ==
- Drug Buddies: A Tribute To The Lemonheads (Double D Records) - 2009

== Bootlegs ==
- Petrol Side Salad (live at the Astoria in London) - 15 October 1992
- The secret life of Evan Dando (live at McCabes Guitar Shop, Los Angeles, CA, USA) - May 1993
