= The Best of The Lemonheads: The Atlantic Years =

The Best of the Lemonheads: The Atlantic Years

Greatest hits album by The Lemonheads
- Released: 1998
- Genre: Alternative rock
- Length: 37:21
- Label: Atlantic

The Lemonheads chronology
Car Button Cloth (1996)	The Best of the Lemonheads: The Atlantic Years (1998)	The Lemonheads (2006)

Professional ratings
Review scores
Source	Rating
Allmusic	4/5 stars
Select	4/5 stars
Stereo & Video	4/5 stars

The Best of the Lemonheads: The Atlantic Years is a compilation album by alternative rock band The Lemonheads. The American release is considered "criminally brief at 12 tracks" by one critic, with the international version adding seven extra tracks.

== Track listing ==
=== US release ===
All songs by Evan Dando unless otherwise stated.

1. "Confetti"
2. "Rudderless"
3. "Into Your Arms" (Robyn St. Clare)
4. "It's a Shame About Ray" (Words by Dando, Tom Morgan; music by Dando)
5. "Mrs. Robinson" (Paul Simon)
6. "My Drug Buddy"
7. "It's About Time" (Dando, Morgan)
8. "Big Gay Heart" (Dando, Morgan)
9. "If I Could Talk I'd Tell You" (Dando, Eugene Kelly)
10. "The Great Big No" (Dando, Morgan)
11. "It's All True"
12. "Ride With Me" (Acoustic)

=== International release ===
All songs by Evan Dando unless otherwise stated.

1. "Confetti"
2. "Into Your Arms" (Robyn St. Clare)
3. "Mrs. Robinson" (Paul Simon)
4. "Rudderless"
5. "It's a Shame About Ray" (Words by Dando, Tom Morgan; music by Dando)
6. "The Great Big No" (Dando, Morgan)
7. "Ride With Me"
8. "My Drug Buddy"
9. "Big Gay Heart" (Dando, Morgan)
10. "It's About Time" (Dando, Morgan)
11. "The Outdoor Type" (Morgan)
12. "It's All True"
13. "If I Could Talk I'd Tell You" (Dando, Eugene Kelly)
14. "Hospital"
15. "Rudy With a Flashlight" (Rainer Ptacek)
16. "Into Your Arms" (Acoustic)
17. "Down About It"
18. "Being Around"
19. "Rick James Acoustic Style"

== Charts ==
Chart (1998)	Peak position
Australian Albums (ARIA)	146
