= Sneeze (disambiguation) =

A sneeze is an explosive expulsion of air from the lungs.

Sneeze or The Sneeze may also refer to:

- Sneeze Achiu (1902–1989), American football player
- Sneeze (band), a music group from Sydney, Australia
  - Sneeze (album), a 1993 album by Sneeze, also released as 41 Songs In 47 Minutes
- Sneeze (video game), a video game inspired by the 2009 swine flu pandemic
- Sneeze: Naoki Urasawa Story Collection, a 2019 anthology of manga by Naoki Urasawa
- The Sneeze (blog), written by Steven Molaro
- The Sneeze (play), a play by Michael Frayn from works by Anton Chekhov

== See also ==
- Sneezy
- Snooze
