= Lost the Spirit to Rock & Roll =

Studio album by Sneeze
- Released: 2001
- Recorded: May 1998–April 2001
- Label: Half a Cow Records
- Producer: Nic Dalton, Tom Morgan

Sneeze chronology
The Four Seezons (1997)	Lost the Spirit to Rock & Roll (2001)	Red Electric Noodle (2004)

Lost the Spirit to Rock and Roll (HAC96) is an album by Australian band Sneeze. As with the band's previous record, Sneeze - aka 41 Songs In 47 Minutes (1995) and Nic Dalton's other band, Godstar, this record has a huge cast of ensemble players. All songs are written by Tom Morgan and Nic Dalton, who play on all tracks, except 6 by Morgan/Dalton/Hayes, 7 by Morgan/Dalton/Meyerratken, 13 by Morgan/Dalton/Ciampa, and 18 by Morgan/Dalton/Hayes. The other members listed below are variously scattered across the record.

The album was rated 2.5 out of 5 stars by AllMusic.

== Track listing ==
1. "Wu-Li"
2. "Too Much Man to Be My Woman"
3. "Doctor of Love"
4. "Deaf Girl, Dumb Guy, Blind Love"
5. "(You're Not) The 'Onely One"
6. "(Don't Go) Distant"
7. "Dancin' Dollars"
8. "Tittie Bar"
9. "B.U."
10. "I Got a Type"
11. "Maybe Moving in Together Wasn't Such a Good Idea"
12. "I Want To Be a Woman (Part 2)"
13. "Welcome Back Succubus"
14. "Sex Gang of the Year"
15. "Casual Cashew Daddy"
16. "I Believe in Marrickville (Parts 1 & 2)"
17. "Ain't No Love On the Road"
18. "I've Lost the Spirit to Rock & Roll"

== Personnel ==
- Tom Morgan
- Nic Dalton
- Lara Meyerratken
- Jess Ciampa
- Nicole Forsyth
- Jen Hoy
- Yi Wang
- Clare Rowe
- Dan Eastabrook
- Martin Taylor
- Greg Gibson
- Tom McElvogue
- Russell Hopkins
- Airena Nakamura
- Bernie Hayes
- Rebecca Henry
- John Encarnacao
- Simon Gibson
- Cameron Bruce
- Christine Hainslin
- Beth Proudly
- Isis Dalton
