= Sleeper (Godstar album) =

Studio album by Godstar
- Released: 1993
- Genre: Alternative rock, indie rock
- Length: 39:58
- Label: Half A Cow; Taang!

Godstar chronology
Sleeper (1993)	Coastal (1995)

Professional ratings
Review scores
Source	Rating
AllMusic	4.5/5 stars

Sleeper is the debut album by Godstar, released in 1993.

== Critical reception ==
AllMusic wrote that "the songs are unpretentious but extremely catchy." Trouser Press called the album full of "chiming guitars and charming vocals." Spin called it "14 pure power pop shots to the dome."

== Track listing ==
1. "Ersatz"
2. "Bad Bad Implication"
3. "Little Bit About"
4. "Single"
5. "Everything You Give Me Breaks"
6. "Wigram"
7. "Forgotten Night"
8. "Lie Down Forever" (Tom Morgan, Robin St. Clare)
9. "The Brightest Star"
10. "Had The Time Of My Life"
11. "Stranger"
12. "Days Gone By"
13. "Something Unplanned"
14. "Every Now & Again"

All songs written by Nic Dalton except where indicated.

== Personnel ==
- Nic Dalton
- Tom Morgan
- Robin St. Clare
- Alison Galloway
- Bob Weston
- Evan Dando
- Rachel King
