= Godstar =

Godstar may refer to:

- "Godstar" (song), a 1985 song by Psychic TV
- Godstar (band), a psychedelic pop band
