= Young Adult (soundtrack) =

Young Adult (Music from the Motion Picture)

Soundtrack album by various artists
- Released: December 6, 2011
- Genre: Pop; indie rock; alternative rock
- Length: 59:38
- Label: Rhino Entertainment

Young Adult (Music from the Motion Picture) is the soundtrack to the 2011 film Young Adult, directed by Jason Reitman. Released by Rhino Records on December 6, 2011, the album consisted of 15 tracks that are mostly indie rock and alternative rock tracks. The soundtrack features artists such as Diana Ross, The Lemonheads, Cracker, 4 Non Blondes, The Replacements, Dinosaur Jr., Suicidal Tendencies and songs from the film's composer Rolfe Kent and Mateo Messina (who previously scored Reitman's directorial Juno). The soundtrack features instrumental renditions by Messina of a number of rock songs, including songs from Faith No More and Pearl Jam.

== Reception ==
Mikael Wood of Los Angeles Times rated it two-and-a-half stars out of five and wrote: "Listening to these songs one after the other — as they might have been presented on a handmade mixtape from the mid-1990s — you think about the shift in tone that’s taken place in pop since then, from that era’s once-ubiquitous slacker vibe to today’s fixation on harder-better-faster-stronger. Young Adult seems to side with that earlier mind-set, but perhaps not: The album closes with a handful of elevator-music renditions of [popular] tunes, that’s easy to hear as a kind of requiem for irony." Reviewing for AllMusic, James Christopher Monger summarised: "Young Adult should find even the most jaded Generation X'ers reaching for their fire sticks and flannels." Writing for New York Daily News, Jim Farber wrote that the soundtrack "offers both a vehicle for retro fun and an implicit send-up of the character's inability to move on".

Comparing the similarities with Reitman's Juno, Al Alexander of The Patriot Ledger praised its soundtrack as "evocative, featuring some of the best music from the late 1980s and early ‘90s. Bands like The Replacements, Lemonheads, Dinosaur Jr. and Teenage Fanclub, whose jangly pop masterpiece, “The Concept,” plays an integral part in the plot." Oliver Lyletton of IndieWire wrote that the soundtrack "has a tastefully curated mix of ‘90s cuts"; he further praised Messina's muzak-like rendering of the 90's hits as the clever choice in the film's music.

== Track listing ==
No.	Title	Artist(s)	Length
1.	"When We Grow Up"	Diana Ross	2:08
2.	"What's Up"	4 Non Blondes	4:56
3.	"Achin' To Be"	The Replacements	3:42
4.	"It's A Shame About Ray" (remastered album version)	The Lemonheads	3:07
5.	"Seether"	Veruca Salt	3:16
6.	"The Concept"	Teenage Fanclub	6:06
7.	"Pledge Your Allegiance"	Suicidal Tendencies	4:29
8.	"Feel the Pain" (2007 remastered LP version)	Dinosaur Jr.	4:17
9.	"Low"	Cracker	4:33
10.	"Why Buddy?"	Rolfe Kent	1:16
11.	"Epic"	Mateo Messina	4:02
12.	"Even Flow"	Mateo Messina	6:24
13.	"Where It's At"	Mateo Messina	4:19
14.	"Big Me"	Mateo Messina	2:19
15.	"Black Hole Sun"	Mateo Messina	4:44
Total length:			59:38

== Credits ==
Credits adapted from AllMusic.

- Linda Cohen – music supervisor
- Peter Halm – design
- Denise Luiso – executive in charge of music (Rhino)
- Mateo Messina – producer, arrangements
- Jason Reitman – executive producer
- Jason Richmond – soundtrack co-ordinator
- Randy Spendlove – executive in charge of music (Paramount Pictures)
- Mason Williams – project supervisor
