= Car Button Cloth =

Studio album by the Lemonheads
- Released: October 15, 1996
- Genres: Pop; country rock; alternative rock; noise rock
- Length: 43:18
- Labels: Atlantic, TAG
- Producer: Bryce Goggin

The Lemonheads chronology
| Come on Feel the Lemonheads (1993) | Car Button Cloth (1996) | The Best of The Lemonheads: The Atlantic Years (1998) |

Singles from Album
- 1. "If I Could Talk I'd Tell You" Released: 1996; 2. "It's All True" Released: 1996; 3. "The Outdoor Type" Released: 1997

Professional ratings
Review scores
| Source | Rating |
|---|---|
| AllMusic | 3.5/5 stars |
| Chicago Tribune | 3/4 stars |
| Entertainment Weekly | B+ |
| The Guardian | 2/5 stars |
| Los Angeles Times | 2.5/4 stars |
| NME | 8/10 |
| Q | 4/5 stars |
| Rolling Stone | 4/5 stars |
| Spin | 8/10 |
| Uncut | 8/10 |

Car Button Cloth is the seventh studio album by the Lemonheads, and the last under their contract with Atlantic Records. The band, as it were, consisted mostly of Dando himself playing many instruments, including his usual guitars and lead vocals, and Patrick Murphy on drums, along with a series of session musicians and producer Bryce Goggin filling in on other instruments. Following the recording of the album, Bill Gibson, who had played bass on several tracks, joined the band for the supporting tour along with Dando and Murphy.

Despite receiving mediocre reviews and not being as commercially successful as the Lemonheads' previous two albums, It's a Shame About Ray and Come On Feel the Lemonheads, Car Button Cloth has gained a minor cult following in recent years. The tracks "It's All True", and "If I Could Talk I'd Tell You" (cowritten by Eugene Kelly of the Vaselines) were released as singles in Europe. "Purple Parallelogram", a song written by Dando and Oasis's Noel Gallagher, was originally included on the promotional copies of Car Button Cloth between "Something's Missing" and "Knoxville Girl", but was reportedly removed at Gallagher's request. The album would be the last studio release from The Lemonheads for a decade, when they released a long-awaited self-titled follow-up, while in the meantime the group's frontman and only remaining original member, Evan Dando, issued his first official solo album, 2003's Baby I'm Bored (a live album and EP were released in Australia two years earlier).

== Release and promotion ==
In 1996, the band performed "If I Could Talk I'd Tell You" and "It's All True" on The Jenny Jones Show.

== Track listing ==
All songs by Evan Dando except where noted.

1. "It's All True" – 2:15
2. "If I Could Talk I'd Tell You" (Dando, Eugene Kelly) – 2:50
3. "Break Me" – 3:34
4. "Hospital" – 2:54
5. "The Outdoor Type" (Tom Morgan) – 2:35
6. "Losing Your Mind" – 5:36
7. "Something's Missing" – 2:47
8. "Knoxville Girl" (Traditional; arranged by Dando) – 3:53
9. "6ix" – 2:39
10. "C'mon Daddy" (Dando, Epic Soundtracks) – 3:32
11. "One More Time" – 2:39
12. "Tenderfoot" (Morgan, Adam Young) – 2:01
13. "Secular Rockulidge" – 5:33

== Personnel ==
- Evan Dando – guitar, lead vocals, percussion, piano, bass, Moog synthesizer; drums on track 12; design, illustrations
- Bill Gibson – bass, backing vocals, guitar
- Patrick Murphy – drums except track 12
- Bryce Goggin – organ, vocals, moog synthesizer, producer, engineer, mixing
- Rich Gilbert – pedal steel
- Royston Langdon – piano; bass on track 12
- Erich Drew Luening – whistle
- Kenny Lyon – guitar, clapping
- Dina Waxman – bass

- Scott Hull – mastering
- Sue Kapa – assistant engineer, photography
- Paul Marconi – mixing assistant
- Darrin Ehardt – design

== Charts ==
Chart performance for Car Button Cloth
| Chart (1996) | Peak position |
|---|---|
| Australian Albums (ARIA) | 36 |
| Swedish Albums (Sverigetopplistan) | 54 |
| UK Albums (Official Charts) | 28 |
| US Billboard 200 | 130 |
