= Rumors of My Demise =

Memoir by Evan Dando

- Author: Evan Dando; Jim Ruland
- Language: English
- Publisher: Gallery Books
- Publication date: October 7, 2025
- Publication place: United States
- ISBN: 9781982175221

Rumors of My Demise is a 2025 memoir by Evan Dando, ghostwritten by Jim Ruland. The book covers Dando's childhood, his leadership of the Lemonheads, and his drug use.

== Background and publication ==
Rumors of My Demise was first announced in late 2020, at which time Dando told press that he was writing the book to "get a little money". The book was written by Jim Ruland, based on extensive interviews with Dando, who then proofread it.

The book was published on October 7, 2025 in the United States by Gallery Books.

== Content ==
Dando's drug use is covered in detail in Rumors of My Demise. Record Collector wrote that the book "reads like the memoir of a career junkie who picks up an unexpected music habit along the way". Dando told the New York Times that he has given up illegal drugs but that "I don't believe God meant us to be sober". Anecdotes in the book include:

- Dando climbing scaffolding outside the Atlantic Records building with Johnny Depp after they had taken LSD.
- Dando "taking out Marilyn Manson's tour manager with a flying banana."
- The Lemonheads missing a Glastonbury Festival slot because Dando was taking heroin in his hotel room.
- Stories of Dando's sleepwalking.
- Dando's father encouraging him when he heard Dando singing "One Way Out" as a child.

== Critical reception ==
Alexis Petridis of The Guardian wrote that Dando "sounds insufferable, but weirdly, he doesn't come across that way in the pages of Rumours of My Demise. You wouldn't want to be in a band with him, nor sign him to your label, but he's a good writer". Music magazines Mojo and Record Collector both rated the book 4 out of 5 stars. Kirkus Reviews called the book "an amiable—and sometimes dark—self-portrait of a self-deprecating artist."
