= Sneeze (album) =

Studio album by Sneeze
- Released: 1993
- Genre: Indie pop
- Length: 47:00
- Label: Half a Cow Records
- Producer: Desmond Heffrey, Michael Lewis, Tod Ersatz

Sneeze chronology
Sneeze (1993)	The Four Seezons (1997)

Sneeze or 41 Songs In 47 Minutes (HAC50) as it is also known, is the first album by Australian band Sneeze. On the cover, tracks 1, 22-41 are marked as "bonus tracks" - the rest were initially released as a double 7 inch vinyl (Moo 08). Total running time of the album is 47 minutes, the track Demand is the shortest song at 18 seconds, Back Down the longest at 1:58.

== Personnel ==
- Tom Morgan
- Nic Dalton
- Ben Aylward
- Evan Dando
- Simon Day
- Paul Duncan
- Allison Galloway
- Simon Holmes
- Michael Levis
- David Lord
- Geoff Milne
- Nicole Moore
- Jesse Peretz
- Stevie Plunder
- Alannah Russack
- David Ryan
- Nicola Schultz
- Robyn St Clare

== Track listing ==
1. Sneeze Theme
2. Ying and Yang Telephone
3. Trouble In School
4. 2 Kates
5. There He Is
6. Commencing December
7. Shakey Ground
8. Doomed To Visit Disneyland
9. Back Down
10. Don't Go (Girlie)
11. Demand
12. Ripped Jeans
13. (Cause You're So) Sweet
14. Winter Won Out
15. Pedal
16. Accident Prone
17. Satan
18. Autumnal Eyes
19. Baby Asleep
20. Monday Night At Mars With Zero People
21. Goodbye Vinyl
22. Darth Vader Helmet
23. Dad's Trailer
24. Create Your Friends
25. Better Days
26. Photo Finish
27. I'm Upset Enough (Parts 1&3)
28. Could Run Or Walk
29. Lolly Land
30. You Put Me Where I Am Today
31. Climbing Vulture Street
32. Evil Star
33. R
34. She's Got A Boyfriend
35. Pins And Needles
36. Dice
37. Cold Cold Morning
38. (You're So) Patient
39. Nevermind
40. Explain Deep December
41. Strawbreeze
