= Live at the Brattle Theatre =

Live at the Brattle Theatre/Griffith Sunset [EP]

Live album by Evan Dando
- Released: October 8, 2001
- Genre: Alternative/Country
- Length: 30:00 (Live at the Brattle Theatre); 24:41 (Griffith Sunset)
- Label: Modular Recordings (Australia)
- Producer: Bryce Goggin (Live at the Brattle Theatre); Wayne Connolly, Evan Dando, Howe Gelb, Goggin (Griffith Sunset)

Evan Dando chronology
Live at the Brattle Theatre/Griffith Sunset [EP] (2001)	Baby I'm Bored (2003)

Live at the Brattle Theatre is a live album by Evan Dando recorded at the Brattle Theatre in Cambridge, Massachusetts, on October 18, 2000, and released in Australia the following year. It contains a mix of originals from Dando's albums with the Lemonheads ("Stove," "My Drug Buddy," "Down About It," etc.) in addition to three covers, including Victoria Williams's "Frying Pan," and one new track, "The Same Thing You Thought Hard About Is the Same Part I Can Live Without," which later appeared on Dando's first solo studio album, Baby I'm Bored (2003).

Live at the Brattle Theatre is packaged as a two-CD set; the second disc is an EP titled Griffith Sunset, which features Dando covering country songs such as Bobby Helms's "Fraulein" and the Louvin Brothers' "My Baby's Gone." AllMusic's Stephen Thomas Erlewine wrote that the live album "moves quickly, which is probably why it needed to be supplemented by a second disc consisting of covers (good, but a little too overworked in the studio), and it really isn't a substantial addition to [Dando's] catalog. It's simply a nice, warm album, which is enough after a half-decade wait."

== Track listing ==
Disc 1: Live at the Brattle Theatre

1. "Down About It" (Evan Dando, Tom Morgan) – 2:25
2. "The Turnpike Down" (Dando) – 2:22
3. "The Outdoor Type" (Morgan) – 2:50
4. "My Drug Buddy" (Dando) – 2:56
5. "The Same Thing You Thought Hard About Is the Same Part I Can Live Without" (Dando, Ben Lee, Morgan) – 3:15
6. "Ride With Me" (Dando) – 3:18
7. "Frying Pan" (Victoria Williams) – 2:36
8. "Excuse Me Mister" (Gale Garnett) – 1:10
9. "Thirteen" (Chris Bell, Alex Chilton) – 2:12
10. "Stove" (Dando) – 3:34
11. "Half the Time" (Dando) – 3:26

Disc 2: Griffith Sunset EP

1. "Ba-De-Da" (Fred Neil) – 3:36
2. "Fraulein" (Lawton Williams) – 3:06
3. "Sam Stone" (John Prine) – 4:47
4. "Nothin'" (Townes Van Zandt) – 2:17
5. "My Baby's Gone" (Hazel Houser) – 2:54
6. "Tribute to Hank Williams" (Tim Hardin) – 3:15
7. "Ba-De-Da" [Alternate Version] – 4:50
