= Baby I'm Bored =

Studio album by Evan Dando
- Released: February 25, 2003
- Genre: Alternative/Country
- Length: 37:52
- Label: Setanta (UK); Bar/None (US)
- Producer: Jon Brion, Bryce Goggin et al.

Evan Dando chronology
| Live at the Brattle Theatre/Griffith Sunset EP (2001) | Baby I'm Bored (2003) |

Professional ratings
Aggregate scores
| Source | Rating |
|---|---|
| Metacritic | 72/100 |
Review scores
| Source | Rating |
| AllMusic | 4/5 stars |
| Blender | 4/5 stars |
| Entertainment Weekly | C |
| The Guardian | 4/5 stars |
| Mojo | 4/5 stars |
| NME | 8/10 |
| Pitchfork | 3.6/10 |
| Rolling Stone | 2/5 stars |
| Spin | B+ |
| Uncut | 4/5 stars |

Baby I'm Bored is an album by Evan Dando that was released on February 25, 2003. It was his first solo studio album as well as his first LP of new songs since the release of the Lemonheads' Car Button Cloth in 1996. Elizabeth Moses, who married Dando in 2000, appears on the album's cover. Baby I'm Bored was reissued by Fire Records in June 2017, on CD and LP, with a bonus disc of rarities; the vinyl version received a special release for Record Store Day 2017.

== Chart performance ==
Baby I'm Bored peaked at #30 on the UK albums chart and #27 on the US Top Independent Albums chart. It produced the singles "Stop My Head" (UK #38) and "It Looks Like You" (UK #68).

== Track listing ==
1. "Repeat" (Jon Brion, Evan Dando) – 3:13
2. "My Idea" (Chris Brokaw, Tom Morgan) – 2:34
3. "Rancho Santa Fe" (Dando, Patrick Doyle) – 4:23
4. "Waking Up" (Dando, Royston Langdon) – 2:36
5. "Hard Drive" (Ben Lee) – 3:14
6. "Shots Is Fired" (Brion, Dando) – 2:47
7. "It Looks Like You" (Brion, Dando) – 3:16
8. "The Same Thing You Thought Hard About Is the Same Part I Can Live Without" (Dando, Lee, Morgan) – 3:43
9. "Why Do You Do This to Yourself?" (Brion, Dando) – 1:59
10. "All My Life" (Lee) – 3:12
11. "Stop My Head" (Brion, Dando) – 3:35
12. "In the Grass All Wine Colored" (Dando) – 3:27

2017 bonus disc

1. "Shots Is Fired" [Alternative Version; featuring Liv Tyler]
2. "I Wanna Be Your Mama Again"
3. "Tongue Tied"
4. "Whoops"
5. "Sucker Punch"
6. "The Same Thing You Thought Hard About Is the Same Part I Can Live Without" [Alternative Version]
7. "Au Bord de la Seine"
8. "Rancho Santa Fe" [Alternative Version]
9. "A Walk in the Woods With Lionel Richie"
10. "Rudy With a Flashlight"
11. "Hannah & Gabi" [Live]
12. "The Same Thing You Thought Hard About Is the Same Part I Can Live Without" [Live]
