= Smudge (band) =

Australian rock/indie pop band

- Origin: Sydney, New South Wales, Australia
- Genres: Rock; indie guitar pop
- Years active: 1991–1999; 2002–present
- Labels: Half a Cow; Shake; Domino
- Members: Tom Morgan; Alison Galloway; Adam Yee
- Past members: Paul Duncan; Pete Kelly

Smudge are an Australian rock and indie pop trio formed in 1991 by Paul Duncan on bass guitar, Alison Galloway on drums and Tom Morgan on guitar and vocals. Morgan is known outside Australia as a song writing collaborator of Evan Dando and his band, the Lemonheads. In 1994 Duncan was replaced on bass guitar by Adam Yee and in 1997 Pete Kelly joined on guitar. Smudge signed with Half a Cow to issue four studio albums, Manilow (1994), Hot Smoke and Sassafras (1994), You Me Carpark . . . Now (1996) and Real McCoy Wrong Sinatra (1998), before going into hiatus from late 1999. Since 2002, Smudge play a few times a year. There has been no new music since 1998.

== History ==
Smudge were formed in 1991 in Sydney by Paul Duncan on bass guitar, Alison Galloway on drums and Tom Morgan on guitar and vocals. Galloway and Morgan were also bandmates in Godstar alongside Nic Dalton, who was the co-owner of the record label, Half a Cow. Duncan and Morgan were former school friends.

Smudge had formed after Galloway and Morgan were asked by Dalton to contribute a song, "Tea, Toast and Turmoil", to the 1991 Half a Cow 7-inch four-track split extended play, Slice (with one track each from Swirl, Jupiter and Studley Lush). The group's first gig was at the Lansdowne Hotel – where Galloway had worked as a barmaid – to launch the EP. An Oz Music Project reporter described Smudge's track as "a short, melodic pop song with colourful lyrics which set the blueprint for the future output of [the band]." In mid-year Morgan met Evan Dando (of the Lemonheads) via Dalton; Morgan and Dando subsequently developed a song writing partnership. They released a 7-inch single, "Don't Want to Be Grant McLennan" (referencing the Go-Betweens' Grant McLennan) in October 1991, which was also issued on a four-track EP of the same name, for the UK market, in March 1992. It was named by John Peel as his record of the week and NME provided a favourable review.

Smudge appeared at the inaugural Big Day Out, January 1992 in Sydney. Love Lust & Lemonjuice (September 1992), their second EP, included the track, "Divan". According to Australian musicologist, Ian McFarlane, the two EPs demonstrated "rough-hewn yet sprightly power pop wrapped around witty lyrics, squalling, fuzzy guitars, urgent melodies and grungy production." They followed with a third EP, Superhero, in May 1993, which included covers of the Laverne & Shirley theme "Making Our Dreams Come True" and John Waite's "Missing You". Steve Bell of theMusic.com.au observed that they had "by this time released a string of catchy, infectious EPs ... so from the outset there was a lot more going on in the Smudge world than mere association or nepotism." In 1993 the group issued a compilation album, Tea, Toast & Turmoil, for the international market on Canadian label Shake/Cargo. It contained material from their three Australian EPs and Various Artists' compilations.

In 1994 Duncan was replaced by Adam Yee on bass guitar (ex-Headache). In March of that year the band released its debut album, Manilow, produced by Dalton, on Half a Cow Records. The first single from the album, "Impractical Joke" (November 1993), was released in three different countries, each with different B-sides culled from a number of home-made four-track recordings conducted independently by each of the band members. Twenty years later Morgan recalled "we did alright with the EPs and stuff, I guess... I think we already had three EPs plus a compilation for overseas, so [Manilow] was our first proper album. It was done pretty quickly, in about five days or something. [Dalton] was producing – he was there every day. He played guitar on a couple of songs, plus helped us with some arrangements and stuff. It was such a long time ago."

In October 1996 they released their second album, You, Me, Carpark...Now!, which was recorded at Idful Music Corporation in Chicago, with producer Casey Rice (Liz Phair, Dirty Three) and number of additional studio musicians, including John McEntire (Tortoise). The release saw a decisively less lo-fi sound. The album provided "Mike Love, Not War" as a single in April, with the cover art featuring a parody of the Beach Boys' album, Pet Sounds. Its second single was a three track, "Slight Return", in August. In 1997 the band released a compilation of rarities, Mo Poontang.

During 1997–1998 the band had two guitars in line-up – Pete Kelly (ex-Disneyfist, Sea Life Park, Decoder Ring) joined the band on second guitar and helped record the band's fourth album, Real McCoy, Wrong Sinatra. It was recorded in a home built eight-track studio in Gerroa, New South Wales, which peaked at No. 10 on the Australian Music Report's Top 10 Localternative Albums.

From late October 1999 until 2002 the band went on an extended hiatus while drummer Alison Galloway went trekking across the world. She joined Her Name in Lights, which issued their debut album, Into the Light Again, in October 2004, but she had already left that band before it appeared.

The band re-united for a limited number of performances in Sydney and Melbourne at the end of 2004. In October 2008 they again performed together at the inaugural Sounds of Spring Festival in Brisbane which was followed by two performances in Melbourne the following weekend. In August 2010 the band released a compilation album, This Smudge is True. In November and December that year they supported The Lemonheads on an Australian tour playing all thirteen songs from the 1992 album It's a Shame about Ray, plus a selection of songs from other albums. Morgan and Galloway played with Dando in the encore performance of "The Outdoor Type". Smudge performed as part of the lineup for the 2011 Big Day Out Festival.

== Discography ==
=== Albums ===
- Manilow – Half a Cow/Domino/Shake (1994)
  - Manilow 2cd Reissue – Half a Cow (2006)
- You, Me, Carpark...Now! – Half a Cow (1996)
- Real McCoy, Wrong Sinatra – Half a Cow (1998)

=== Compilations ===
- Tea, Toast & Turmoil – Shake The Record (Canada, 1993)
- Mo' Poontang – Half a Cow (1997)
- This Smudge Is True – Half a Cow (2010)

=== Extended plays ===
- Don't Want to Be Grant McLennan – Shock UK (1992) (7-inch EP)
- Love, Lust & Lemonjuice – Half a Cow (1992)
- Superhero – Half a Cow/Domino (1993)
- Hot Smoke and Sassafras – Half a Cow/Domino/Shake/100 Guitar Mania (1994)
- Big City Poontang – Half a Cow (1995)
- Mike Love Not War – Half a Cow (1996)
- Impractical Joke – Half a Cow/Domino/Shake (1994)
- Slight Return EP – Half a Cow (1996)
- Eighteen in a Week – Half a Cow (1999)

=== Singles ===
- "Don't Want to Be Grant McLennan" – Half a Cow (1991) (7-inch)
- "Leroy de Foix" – Half a Cow (1992) (promotional 7-inch)
- "The Outdoor Type" – Domino (1993) (12-inch/cd)
- "Desmond" 7 – The Bus Stop Label, USA (1994) (7-inch)
- "Hot Potato (demo version)" – Blind (1998) (split 7-inch)

== Further references ==
- Half a Cow: Smudge. Retrieved 31 May 2007.
