= The Lemonheads (album) =

Studio album by The Lemonheads
- Released: September 26, 2006
- Recorded: Blasting Room, Fort Collins, Colorado
- Genre: Punk rock
- Label: Vagrant
- Producers: Bill Stevenson, Evan Dando

The Lemonheads chronology
The Best of the Lemonheads: The Atlantic Years (1998)	The Lemonheads (2006)	Varshons (2009)

The Lemonheads is the eighth studio album by alternative rock band the Lemonheads and the first after their return from a nine-year hiatus. Bandleader Evan Dando created the album with Descendents rhythm section Karl Alvarez on bass and Bill Stevenson on drums.

== Background ==
On April 26, 2006, it was announced that the Lemonheads had signed to Vagrant Records. The group's new lineup consisted of original member Evan Dando and Descendents/All bassist Karl Alvarez and drummer Bill Stevenson. It was also revealed that the band was working on an album due for release later in the year.

The Lemonheads features contributions from Josh Lattanzi on bass, the Band's Garth Hudson on keyboards, and Dinosaur Jr.'s J Mascis on lead guitar. "Steve's Boy" is dedicated to William A. Stevenson, Bill Stevenson's father.

== Release ==
On July 6, 2006, The Lemonheads was announced for release, and the track listing was revealed; later that month, the band played a few shows in the UK. On August 22, 2006, "No Backbone" was posted online. The Lemonheads was made available for streaming on September 25, 2006, and was released a day later. In November and December 2006, the band went on a tour of the U.S. In January and February 2007, they toured the US again; they then embarked on a tour of New Zealand and Australia in March and April 2007. In July 2007, the band toured the US East Coast with support from the Icarus Line.

A limited-edition yellow vinyl version of the album was released in 2008, with signed copies made available via the Lemonheads' website.

== Critical reception ==
Professional ratings
Aggregate scores
Source	Rating
Metacritic	70/100
Review scores
Source	Rating
AllMusic	4/5 stars
The Guardian	3/5 stars
Pitchfork	6.8/10
Rolling Stone	2.5/5 stars
Slant	4.5/5 stars
Spin	3/5 stars

On review aggregator Metacritic the album holds a score of 70/100, based on 23 reviews, indicating a "generally favorable" reception.

Jimmy Newlin of Slant reviewed the album very positively, calling it "nearly as great as the band’s masterpiece, It's a Shame About Ray, and far more dependable than the runner-up Come on Feel the Lemonheads." Jon Young of Spin wrote that "Dando chooses maximum accessibility, offering agreeably chunky guitar pop." Maddy Costa of the Guardian was more critical, writing "there's a broken feeling about this album, a resignation that reflects the trouble of the intervening years."

== Track listing ==
All songs by Evan Dando unless otherwise stated.

1. "Black Gown" - 2:04
2. "Become the Enemy" (Bill Stevenson) - 3:54
3. "Pittsburgh" - 2:55
4. "Let's Just Laugh" (Dando, Stevenson) - 4:44
5. "Poughkeepsie" - 2:10
6. "Rule of Three" - 2:19
7. "No Backbone" (Tom Morgan) - 3:07
8. "Baby's Home" (Morgan; intro by Dando) - 3:31
9. "In Passing" - 2:50
10. "Steve's Boy" (Stevenson) - 2:44
11. "December" - 4:22

== Personnel ==
The Lemonheads

Evan Dando — Vocals and guitar; piano on track 1

Karl Alvarez — Bass on tracks 1, 2, 3, 4, 7, 10 and 11

Bill Stevenson — Drums, additional guitar, backing vocals

Additional musicians

Josh Lattanzi — Bass on tracks 5, 6, 8 and 9

Andrew Berlin — Electric piano on track 8

Gibby Haynes — Cassette noise on track 6

J Mascis — Guitar on tracks 7 and 10

Spot — Guitar on track 10

Garth Hudson — Keyboard on tracks 1 and 11

Technical

Engineered by Andrew Berlin, Bill Stevenson, and Jason Livermore

Mixed and mastered by Jason Livermore

Produced by Bill Stevenson and Evan Dando

== Charts ==
Chart performance for The Lemonheads
Chart (2006)	Peak position
Australian Albums (ARIA)	97
Belgian Albums (Ultratop Flanders)	98
German Albums (Offizielle Top 100)	92
UK Albums (Official Charts)	56
US Independent Albums (Billboard)	26
