= Sneeze (band) =

Australian pop rock band

- Origin: Sydney, New South Wales, Australia
- Genres: Pop rock
- Years active: 1991–present
- Label: Half a Cow/MGM
- Past members: Nic Dalton; Tom Morgan; Lara Meyerratken; Russell Hopkinson; Simon Gibson; Evan Dando; Andy Calvert; Bill Gibson; Cameron Bruce; Leticia Nichang

Sneeze are an Australian pop rock band formed in 1991 by Nic Dalton (who ran the band's record label, Half a Cow) on vocals, bass guitar, guitar, keyboards, and drums, and Tom Morgan (from Smudge) on vocals and guitar. They issued four albums, Sneeze (1993), The Four Seezons (1997), Lost the Spirit to Rock & Roll (2001) and Just The Blues Sped Up (April 2004). As of mid-2019, Sneeze have been working on new material.

== History ==
Sneeze were formed in Sydney in 1991 by Nic Dalton (The Plunderers) on vocals, bass guitar, guitar, keyboards and drums, and Tom Morgan (from Smudge) on vocals and guitar. In 1993 they issued their debut album, Sneeze, which initially comprised 20 tracks with none over two minutes in length on Dalton's own label, Half a Cow. It was recorded with a range of guest musicians: Simon Day (from Ratcat) on guitar and vocals, Alannah Russack (from the Hummingbirds) on guitar and vocals, and Evan Dando (from the Lemonheads) on guitar and vocals. It was expanded by 21 additional tracks and released on CD as 41 Songs in 47 Minutes (June 1996).

Dalton later recalled that the group was initially a studio-only side project, "Tom and I were just writing these short songs for Smudge, I was in the Plunderers and the Hummingbirds. The Lemonheads were the first band to record a Sneeze song, even before Tom and I did. We ended up starting Sneeze, but we never thought we’d play live." Lara Meyerratken joined on the drums in 1996 when they started playing live. Sneeze's second album, The Four Seezons (1997), has one side providing their "take on Vivaldi's Four Seasons" and the b-side has live tracks recorded at Fbi Radio. After Meyerratken left the group in 1998 they used "several drummers including using the drummer of their support act for the evening."

Sneeze had many other members including drummers Russell Hopkinson (from You Am I), Simon Gibson (from Half Miler), and Andy Calvert (from Wifey). Bill Gibson (from the Eastern Dark) on bass guitar and Cameron Bruce (from the Fantastic Leslie) on keyboards have played shows with the band, as did Bernie Hayes, Jess Ciampa and Leticia Nischang (from Bambino Koresh). Sneeze saw their floating line-up as one of their strengths. Dalton described how "there’s about 10 or 11 Sneeze members. Basically it's like the album, Sneeze is who ever we want to get in the band. Every time we play live we seem to have a completely different lineup, and just really love that. It makes it fresh and exciting, and you never know who's going to turn up and what it's going to sound like. But there're all such good musicians that it always ends up sounding great."

The band's third album, Lost the Spirit to Rock & Roll (2001), was described by Michelle Ho of Oz Music Project as "Reaching past the simple (but not necessarily bad) structure of classic indie pop guitar/bass/drums, Sneeze delves into elements of soul, groove and even, heaven help us, dabblings into seventies disco, making heavy use of the sorely underrated casio keyboard, bongo drums and deliciously giggle-worthy male falsettos, making [the album] one of the most unique Australian pop releases to date." In April of the following year they issued an eight-track extended play, Maybe Moving In, which Ho's colleague Jasper Lee felt "shows the band with slightly greater thematic consistency that is far easier to appreciate... it's hard to discern when to take Sneeze seriously, no doubt they've got their act together in this fairly comprehensive and lengthy EP. There are moments where you can see the pop genius of Morgan and Dalton at work, and that can only be a good thing."

The group's fourth album, Just the Blues Sped Up (April 2004), was promoted with an east coast tour. AllMusic's Richie Unterberger rated the album as three out of four stars and explained, "Variety can be a virtue, but the main shortfall here is that the songs aren't special. The range, it must be emphasized, is admirable: quasi-hard rock, psychedelic, punkish numbers that verge on Fall-like harshness at times, amiable No Depression-like country-rock, turgid soul-pop vaguely reminiscent of Lambchop..."

Sneeze's recordings use a range of guest artists including other members of the Lemonheads (who were the first band to record a song for the first Sneeze album), Robyn St. Clare, Simon Holmes (of the Hummingbirds), Bernie Hayes, John Encarnacao (from Warmer), Swirl, the Plunderers) and Jess Ciampa. Gibson and Holmes were both members of Her Name in Lights, which issued their debut album, Into the Light Again, in October 2004.

== Discography ==
=== Albums ===
- Sneeze – Half a Cow (hac50, January 1994)
  - 41 Songs in 47 Minutes – Half a Cow (June 1996)
- The Four Seezons – 12 inch vinyl only (hac69, 1997)
- Lost the Spirit to Rock & Roll (hac96, 2001)
- Just the Blues Sped Up (hac109, 5 April 2004)

=== Extended plays ===
- Shaky Ground (ER-177, 1997)
- The Maybe Moving In EP aka Maybe Moving in Together Wasn't Such a Good Idea (hac97, 15 April 2002)

=== Singles ===
- Doctor of Love (hac81, 1999)
- 1-800 Billy Ruane (hac193, 2017)

=== Compilations ===
- Ying And Yang Telephone, Ripped Jeans on Half A Cow "Compilation" (hac28, 1993)
- Shhh! Sex Gang… (hac200, 2018)
