= Godstar (band) =

Australian psychedelic pop band

- Also known as: The Godstar Reminder, The Godstar Rewinder
- Origin: Sydney, New South Wales, Australia
- Genres: Psychedelic pop
- Years active: 1991–1995
- Labels: Half A Cow, Taang! The Bus Stop Label
- Past members: Nic Dalton; Tania Bowers; John Encarnacao; Bon King; Robyn St Clare; John Encarnacao; Alison Galloway; Tom Morgan

Godstar were a psychedelic pop band which formed in 1991. The group's founding mainstay, Nic Dalton, is a multi-instrumentalist who was also in The Plunderers, Sneeze and The Lemonheads, and ran the Half A Cow record label. Other members were Robyn St Clare The Hummingbirds, Alison Galloway on drums (ex-Jupiter) and Tom Morgan (also in Sneeze) on guitar and vocals. In September 1993 the band toured nationally promoting their debut studio album, Sleeper. In July 1995 their second album, Coastal, appeared and was followed by another national tour. The group disbanded later that year. Dalton's Half a Cow label issued further Godstar material under the name The Godstar Reminder. Around this time, Dalton formed other groups including The Kombi Nation, The Ultimate Vanilla and Chewee. Galloway and Morgan were also members of Smudge, an indie pop band, during their time with Godstar.

== History ==
In January 1991 Godstar were formed in Sydney with Nic Dalton The Plunderers, also in Sneeze) on guitar and lead vocals; John Encarnacao (Flies) on lead guitar; Alison Galloway (Jupiter) on drums; and Tom Morgan (also in Sneeze) on bass guitar. This line-up recorded a handful of songs and never played live. Dalton took the name from United Kingdom video art and music group, Psychic TV's 1986 single of the same name. Before the end of the year Galloway and Morgan formed an indie pop band, Smudge, while Dalton was also involved with jangle pop group, The Hummingbirds. In 1992 Godstar's line-up of Dalton, Galloway and Morgan were joined by Robyn St Clare (also in The Hummingbirds) on bass guitar and vocals. They recorded two extended plays, The Brightest Star (November 1992) and Chemcraze (May 1993), before Dalton flew to join United States alternative rockers, The Lemonheads from mid-1992. Both EPs were issued on the Dalton-owned Half A Cow record label. Dalton and Morgan had co-written material with The Lemonheads' founder Evan Dando.

In August 1992 while The Lemonheads were touring the US, Godstar recorded their debut studio album, Sleeper, in Boston. Aside from Dalton, Galloway, Morgan and St Clare, other musicians used were Dando on drums (for three tracks) and Rachael King (The Cake Kitchen and Bob Weston (Juliana Hatfield Band) on bass guitar. The album was produced by the band and released in August 1993 in Australia on Half a Cow / Regular Records and in October for the US-Canadian market on Taang! Records with two bonus tracks. Australian rock music historian, Ian McFarlane, observed it was "full of rough-hewn and basic, yet boisterous, psychedelic pop". AllMusic's Stewart Mason commended Dalton's "affably plain punk-pop voice", on "songs [that] are unpretentious but extremely catchy" which showcased the group's "wave of distorted guitars and righteously sloppy drumming". During September the band, with Dando on board, promoted the album on an Australian east coast tour. During 1994 they issued two EPs, Glasgow and Four Seventy, followed by a compilation album, Way Out Jim, and another EP, Single.

In July 1995 Godstar issued their second album, Coastal, which McFarlane found "mixed feisty pop and psychedelic sound collages with dancefloor grooves". AllMusic's Richie Unterberger described it as "a reasonably engaging 1990s alternative rock record with a guitar pop slant, though not one that stands out in the pack of a genre in which many bands sound rather similar to each other". The group followed with another national tour but disbanded by the end of the year. Dalton's Half a Cow label issued further Godstar material under the name The Godstar Reminder. Dalton formed other groups including The Kombi Nation and The Ultimate Vanilla, and also had a solo career. Galloway and Morgan continued with Smudge. Like many other Half a Cow bands, Godstar had a long list of recording musicians. On most tracks, the only common members were Dalton and Morgan. The number of people on any particular track varied and belied the simple pop punk nature of the songs. In 1997 a compilation album, September, was issued by The Godstar Reminder; it was a collection of otherwise unreleased tracks, including some solo work by Dalton. In February a 2× CD version of Coastal was reissued with bonus tracks, and a bonus disc, Before and After Coastal, comprising unreleased recordings, rare tracks, and a live show from November 1995".

Godstar reformed for one show in October 2015 at the Petersham Bowling Club in Sydney when Half A Cow Records celebrated their 25th anniversary. Billed as 'The Godstar Rewinder', it was Godstar's first appearance in twenty years and the band's line-up consisted of Dalton, along with Tom Morgan, John Encarnacao, Tania Bowers, Alison Galloway and guest vocalist Alannah Russack from the Hummingbirds.

== Discography ==
=== Studio albums ===
- Sleeper – Half A Cow HACCD22 (August 1993)
- Coastal – Half a Cow HACCD42 (July 1995)

=== Extended plays ===
- The Brightest Star – Half A Cow HACCD11 (November 1992)
- Lie Down Forever – Half a Cow HACCD21, Taang! Records TAANG!80 (1993)
- Bad Bad Implications – The Chemcraze E.P. – Half a Cow HACCD14 (May 1993)
- Glasgow – Half a Cow/RuggerBugger DUMP17 (1994)
- Single – Taang! Records TAANG!85 (1994) Note: Issued as a three-track 7" vinyl, or as a six-track CD.
- Four Seventy – Bus Stop BUS 37 (1994)
- Take the Money and Run – Elefant Records ER-184 (1996) Note: Released as by The Godstar Reminder in Spain.

=== Singles ===
- "Table for One" (1995)
- "Seeing Stars" (1995)
- "Has She Got Your Time Now" (1996) Note: Released as by The Godstar Reminder

=== Compilation albums ===
- Way Out Jim – 100 Guitar Mania 100GM02 (1994)
- September – Half A Cow HAC 60 (1997)
