= It's a Shame About Ray (song) =

1992 single by the Lemonheads

Single by the Lemonheads

from the album It's a Shame About Ray
- Released: October 5, 1992
- Genre: Power pop; alternative rock
- Length: 3:06
- Label: Atlantic
- Songwriter(s): Evan Dando, Tom Morgan
- Producer(s): The Robb Brothers

The Lemonheads singles chronology
"Gonna Get Along Without Ya Now" (1991)	"It's a Shame About Ray" (1992)	"Mrs. Robinson" (1992)

"It's a Shame About Ray" is a song by American alternative rock band the Lemonheads from their album of the same name. Written by frontman Evan Dando and his friend and occasional songwriting partner Tom Morgan, the song was inspired by a story in an Australian newspaper. The song was released as a single in October 1992, charting in the UK. It has since received positive reception from critics.

== Background ==
"It's a Shame About Ray" was written by Evan Dando with friend Tom Morgan while in Sydney, Australia. The song title came from when they saw the line, "It's a shame about Ray," in a Sydney newspaper article. Dando recalled:

We came across a newspaper article that said, "It's a Shame About Ray," and we just liked that phrase. From there, I had the music and I just wrote it really quickly—about half an hour or an hour—and then we had it. We brought it down to our friend's record store and played it for him, and we were all excited about it. That was the first song we had written together.

Dando said of the song's ambiguous lyrics, "It's spooky. It's about a disappearing person. It's a very open-ended, grey sort of song. I think it's one of those things, like The Trouble with Harry. Like a mysterious sort of song."

The article that was the source of the line 'It's a shame about Ray' was published in Sydney's Sun-Herald newspaper on Sunday, 3 November 1991.The story was a double-page spread on pages 12-13 of the newspaper titled, 'Kings Cross: showcase of our shame', written by journalists Susan Borham and Stephen Skinner.

The first part of the article detailed research about the health of young teenage girls who were prostitutes in Sydney's King's Cross. In particular, their exposure to AIDS. A second section was titled 'The children who survive on drugs and sex'. This provided vignettes of 8 young people and the backgrounds to how they had become homeless and turned to drugs and prostitution in Kings Cross.

The last of these was titled 'Ray's story'. It outlined how 15-year old Ray from Nowra was forced to leave home after his alcoholic, abusive father violently attacked his mother and then mutilated his pet dog in front of him. Ray had then dropped out of grade 8 at Shoalhaven High School and moved to Sydney. He slept on the streets begging for money and sometimes robbing people.

Ray spoke of his friendship with 14-year old named 'John' who was a prostitute at 'The Wall' in Darlinghurst, a Sydney landmark synonymous with male sex workers. Ray explained that John was encouraging Ray to join him by working as a prostitute as well. The story ended with comments from Ray's former school principal, Bill Bailey, who the journalists had contacted to verify Ray's background. The school principal stated:

"After living on the streets for as long as he has, I doubt that he could ever fit back into the school system."

"It's a shame his school education has ended. You come across kids like him from time to time - with the family problems he has - and sometimes at the school you are able to make a success of them."

"It's a shame about Ray."

== Release ==
"It's a Shame About Ray" was released on the album of the same name in 1992. The song was released as the debut single from the album, with "Shakey Ground" on the B-side. The single became a minor chart hit, reaching number 31 in the UK and number 68 in Australia. The song also reached number five on the US modern rock charts.

A music video for the song was filmed, featuring Johnny Depp in a starring role. The song has also appeared on the compilation The Best of The Lemonheads: The Atlantic Years.

== Reception ==
"It's a Shame About Ray" has generally seen positive reception from critics. Len Comaratta of Consequence wrote that the song was "among the best releases of the decade (if not beyond)," while Michael Gallucci of Diffuser.fm praised the song as "a ringing '90s power-pop tune laced with Dando's sleepy-stoner delivery and a sprinkling of indie-rock spice." Bill Janovitz of AllMusic described the track as "a wistful, melodic singalong song that has an underlying element of melancholy [that] is delightfully vague in its message" and praised the song's melody and production.

== Charts ==
Weekly chart performance for "It's a Shame About Ray"
Chart (1993)	Peak position
Australia (ARIA)	68
UK Singles (OCC)	31
US Modern Rock Tracks (Billboard)	5

== Release history ==
Release dates and formats for "It's a Shame About Ray"
Region	Date	Format(s)	Label(s)	Ref.
United Kingdom	October 5, 1992	7-inch vinyl; 10-inch vinyl; CD; cassette	Atlantic	
United Kingdom (rerelease)	March 29, 1993	10-inch vinyl; CD; cassette	Atlantic	
Australia	May 3, 1993	CD; cassette	Atlantic	
