= July (band) =

British rock music group

- Origin: Ealing, England
- Genres: Psychedelic rock, psychedelic pop
- Years active: 1968–1969, 2009–present
- Labels: Major Minor, Ariola, Epic
- Members: Tom Newman; Pete Cook; Chris Jackson; Alan James
- Past members: Tony Duhig; Jon Field

July are a psychedelic rock band from Ealing, London that was professionally active between 1968 and 1969, and reformed in 2009. The band's music was a blend of psychedelic rock and psychedelic pop, marked by lush harmonies, acoustic guitars, keyboards, and intricate lead guitar work. Although none of the band's records charted in the UK or the U.S., July are today best remembered for their songs "My Clown", "Dandelion Seeds", and "The Way", which have all been included on a number of compilation albums over the years.

== History ==
There is some dispute regarding the band's origin. According to encyclopedia author Colin Larkin, the AllMusic website, and a number of other sources, the band's origin can be traced back to a late 1950s skiffle group named the Playboys, which later transitioned into a rhythm and blues band and changed their name to The Thoughts, before finally becoming The Tomcats. However, in a 2009 podcast interview the band members themselves disputed this history, calling it "a misunderstanding". According to the band, they initially formed in the early 1960s as The Dreamers and began playing music that was influenced by The Shadows and the Everly Brothers amongst others. The Dreamers soon changed their name to The Tomcats, however, due to the national success that Freddie and the Dreamers were enjoying at the time, and they also transitioned into playing harder rhythm and blues music, influenced by the likes of Chuck Berry and Bo Diddley. The original Tomcats' line-up included guitarist and singer Tom Newman, bassist Alan James, lead guitarist Peter Cook, and drummer Chris Jackson, but this incarnation of the band broke up in 1965. Alan James has stated that it was Newman's father who suggested The Tomcats as a new name, which the group then used.

Meanwhile, another London based R&B group, named Second Thoughts, came together in 1965. Second Thoughts included conga player, flautist and keyboardist Jon Field, guitarist Tony Duhig, lead singer Patrick Campbell-Lyons, and future member of Thunderclap Newman John "Speedy" Keen among its members. Like The Tomcats, Second Thoughts also broke up in 1965, with singer Patrick Campbell-Lyons departing to form the psychedelic rock band Nirvana with Alex Spyropoulos. Soon after, a new line-up of The Tomcats came together, featuring members of the original band and ex-members of Second Thoughts: Newman on vocals, Duhig on guitar, Field on flute/keyboards, James on bass, and Jackson on drums. The Tomcats then relocated to Spain and enjoyed success there during 1966 as "Los Tomcats", playing gigs in Madrid, Barcelona, and the Canary Islands, as well as reaching the Spanish charts with a string of EPs.

After returning to London, Newman and his friend Pete Cook (who had been in the first line-up of The Tomcats) began writing new material for the group that was less R&B influenced and more psychedelic in nature. Cook was not a member of the group at this time, however.

The band changed their name to July in 1968 and secured a recording contract with Major Minor Records soon after. The band (still a qunitet of Newman, Duhig, Field, James, and Jackson). who were by now managed by Spencer Davis, released "My Clown" b/w "Dandelion Seeds" as their first single in 1968, but it failed to reach the UK Singles Chart. The band also issued a self-titled album in 1968, but this too failed to reach the charts. Newman wrote the vast majority of the band's songs, with Jackson contributing one LP track. Newman was later (according to a 1975 interview) to recall the description by one reviewer who said that "it was the worst album they'd ever heard and a complete waste of plastic". In the years since its release, the July album has become a much sought after rarity among collectors of British psychedelia. A second single was released, coupling the non-album song "Hello, Who's There?" with "The Way" but again, this release was a commercial failure.

July disbanded in 1969, with Duhig going on to play in the band Unit 4 + 2, before hooking up with Field and vocalist Glyn Havard to form Jade Warrior. Newman released a number of solo albums and also produced several albums for other artists, including Mike Oldfield (Tubular Bells, Tubular Bells II, and Heaven's Open).

In the years since the band's demise, the July album has been reissued a number of times by different record labels. There have also been two compilations released by the band: the 1987 LP Dandelion Seeds, which features all of the tracks from the July album and both sides of the "Hello, Who's There?" single; and 1995's The Second of July, which contains previously unreleased alternate versions and outtakes (including some material co-written by Cook with Newman). In addition, songs by July have appeared on a number of various artists compilations, including The British Psychedelic Trip, Vol. 2, It's Only a Passing Phase, Electric Psychedelic Sitar Headswirlers, Vol. 1, The Great British Psychedelic Trip Vol 3: 1965–1970, Acid Drops, Spacedust, & Flying Saucers: Psychedelic Confectionery, and Insane Times: 25 British Psychedelic Artefacts from the EMI Vaults.

Duhig died in 1990.

In 2009, Tom Newman, Pete Cook, Chris Jackson, and Alan James reformed July. For 2013's Resurrection, Cook and Newman were the only credited band members. Cook was the main songwriter, with one track written by Newman.

== Band members ==
- Tom Newman – lead vocals, guitar (born Thomas Dennis Newman, 6 May 1943, Perivale Middlesex)
- Tony Duhig – lead guitar, organ (born Anthony Christopher Duhig, 18 September 1941, Acton, west London died 11 November 1990, Somerset)
- Jon Field – vocals, flute, organ (born John Frederick Field, 5 July 1940, Harrow, Middlesex)
- Chris Jackson – drums, organ
- Alan James – bass guitar
- Peter Cook – vocals, guitar

== Discography ==
=== Singles ===
- "My Clown"/"Dandelion Seeds" (Major Minor MM 568) 1968
- "Hello, Who's There?"/"The Way" (Major Minor MM 580) 1968

=== Albums ===
Studio albums

- July (1968)
- Resurrection (2013)
- The Wight Album (2020)

Compilations

- Dandelion Seeds (1987)
- The Second of July (1995)
