= Snooze =

Snooze may refer to:

- Sleep, a naturally recurring state of reduced consciousness and inactivity, especially:
  - Nap, a short period of sleep
- Snooze button, a common feature of an alarm clock
- Snooze (album), a 1996 album by American pianist Joanne Brackeen
- "Snooze" (SZA song), 2022
- "Snooze" (Agust D song), 2023
- "Snooze" (The Goodies), an episode of the British television series The Goodies
- Snooze (musician) or Dominique Dalcan (born 1964), French electronic musician and composer
