= Varshons 2 =

Varshons II

Studio album by The Lemonheads
- Released: February 8, 2019
- Length: 39:29
- Label: Fire

The Lemonheads chronology
Varshons (2009)	Varshons II (2019)	Love Chant (2025)

Professional ratings
Aggregate scores
Source	Rating
Metacritic	68/100
Review scores
Source	Rating
AllMusic	3.5/5 stars
Under the Radar	3/10
Louder Than War	7/10
Flood Magazine	7/10

Varshons II is the tenth studio album by American band The Lemonheads. It was released on February 8, 2019, through Fire Records.

It is the second cover album by The Lemonheads, with Varshons being released in 2009.

== Track listing ==
Discography by Discogs, Rolling Stone, and AllMusic

No.	Title	Writer(s)	Original artist	Length
1.	"Can't Forget"	Ira Kaplan	Yo La Tengo	2:12
2.	"Settled Down Like Rain"	Gary Louris, Mark Olson	The Jayhawks	2:52
3.	"Old Man Blank"	Nick Saloman	The Bevis Frond	3:36
4.	"Things"	Paul Westerberg	Paul Westerberg	2:45
5.	"Speed of the Sound of Loneliness"	John Prine	John Prine	2:46
6.	"Abandoned"	Lucinda Williams	Lucinda Williams	3:40
7.	"Now and Then"		Natural Child	2:37
8.	"Magnet"	Joey Spampinato, Terry Adams	NRBQ	3:24
9.	"Round Here"	Rodney Clawson, Chris Tompkins, Thomas Rhett	Florida Georgia Line	2:18
10.	"TAQN"	Joe Ramirez	The Eyes	2:03
11.	"Unfamiliar"		The GiveGoods	3:32
12.	"Straight to You"	Nick Cave	Nick Cave and the Bad Seeds	4:27
13.	"Take It Easy"	Jackson Browne, Glenn Frey	Eagles	3:17

== Charts ==
Chart	Peak position
Scottish Albums (Official Charts)	75
UK Independent Albums (Official Charts)	14
US Independent Albums (Billboard)	43
