= Varshons =

Studio album by the Lemonheads
- Released: June 23, 2009
- Recorded: 2008
- Genres: Alternative rock, punk rock
- Label: The End
- Producer: Gibby Haynes

The Lemonheads chronology
The Lemonheads (2006)	Varshons (2009)	Varshons II (2019)

Professional ratings
Review scores
Source	Rating
AllMusic	4/5 stars
The A.V. Club	C+
Drowned in Sound	6/10 stars
Pitchfork	4.7/10
Planet Sound	8/10 stars
PopMatters	7/10 stars

Varshons is the ninth studio album by alternative rock band the Lemonheads, and is an album of covers. On March 27, 2009, it was announced that Varshons would be released in the US on June 23 on The End Records. It was promoted with a US tour throughout June 2009, and a UK tour in September 2009. Between January and March 2010, Dando went on a US tour.

Produced by Butthole Surfers frontman Gibby Haynes, the album features a variety of tracks from GG Allin, Wire, Leonard Cohen, and Christina Aguilera. Guest performances include vocals from actress Liv Tyler on Leonard Cohen's "Hey, That's No Way to Say Goodbye", and model Kate Moss guests on Arling & Cameron's "Dirty Robot". The Only Ones guitarist John Perry guests on five tracks.

The cover art is by Mark Dagley. The front cover resembles a Spirograph design, while the rear cover is an homage to the back cover of Never Mind the Bollocks, Here's the Sex Pistols.

Online editions of the album feature a bonus track, a cover of Tim Hardin's "How Can We Hang On to a Dream".

== Track listing ==
#	Title	Writer	Original artist	Time
1.	"I Just Can't Take It Anymore"	Gram Parsons	Gram Parsons	3:02
2.	"Fragile"	Bruce Gilbert, Graham Lewis, Colin Newman, Robert Gotobed	Wire	1:19
3.	"Layin' Up with Linda"	GG Allin	GG Allin	2:17
4.	"Waiting Around to Die"	Townes Van Zandt	Townes Van Zandt	2:22
5.	"The Green Fuz"	Randy Alvey, Les Dale	Randy Alvey & The Green Fuz	2:48
6.	"Yesterlove"	Ian Willis	Sam Gopal	4:30
7.	"Dirty Robot"	Gerry Arling, Richard Cameron	Arling & Cameron	2:54
8.	"Dandelion Seeds"	July	July	3:31
9.	"New Mexico"	FuckEmos	FuckEmos	3:41
10.	"Hey, That's No Way to Say Goodbye"	Leonard Cohen	Leonard Cohen	3:04
11.	"Beautiful"	Linda Perry	Christina Aguilera	3:45
12.	"How Can We Hang On?" (Online Bonus Track)	Tim Hardin	Tim Hardin	1:56
