= Sneeze (video game) =

2009 video game

- Screenshot of Sneeze
- Developer: Oil Productions / Player 3
- Publisher: Channel 4 / Wellcome Trust
- Release: 2009
- Mode: Single-player

Sneeze is a 2009 browser game created in Adobe Flash. In every level, the player can sneeze only once and is awarded points based on how many people they are able to infect.

Sneeze was commissioned by the Wellcome Trust and Channel 4 to subversively teach children the importance of healthy practices. During the 2009 swine flu pandemic, inspired Flash games became prevalent, and Miniclip rebranded the game Stop Swine Flu to draw attention to it. It soon reached the Top 10 on their website. Some journalists considered games based on the swine flu to be in poor taste. In particular, Donald G. McNeil Jr. of The New York Times questioned the awarding of bonus points for infecting children and the elderly.

== Gameplay ==
Sneeze is a browser game made in Adobe Flash. Players control their avatar and have only one sneeze, which they must use to infect as many people as possible. Infected people turn green and sneeze in turn, infecting more people. Players are awarded points based on how many people were infected, with bonus points awarded for infecting children and elderly people. If they infect enough people, the player progresses to the next level. Examples of levels include a pedestrian-filled street, a train station, and a nursery school. Virus-related factoids appear in between levels.

== Background and reception ==
The 2009 swine flu pandemic saw the Influenza A virus subtype H1N1 ("swine flu") spread rapidly from the United States across the globe and infect millions of people. Journalists noticed that the pandemic had inspired many browser-based Flash games, including Swinefighters and Swine Flu: Hamdemic. The number of players on virus-related games released before the pandemic also rose significantly. Mic Wright of The Guardian said that some people were skeptical if topics like disease should be explored in video games.

Commissioned by the Wellcome Trust and Channel 4, Sneeze was released in 2009 before the pandemic as part of a series on genetics called Routes. It was created to subversively encourage young people to practice "healthy habits". The attention given to the pandemic led game portal Miniclip to rename the game Stop Swine Flu later in the year. Wright characterized the change as "misleading" and noted that it led The New York Times' Donald G. McNeil Jr. to question if it was appropriate for the game to award points for infecting toddlers. A commissioning editor for education at Channel 4 asked Miniclip to restore the original message of Sneeze. Griffin McElroy of Engadget considered the game surprisingly fun, but Asher Moses of the Brisbane Times opined that swine flu games "inevitably border on bad taste". Stop Sneeze Flu reached the Top 10 on the Miniclip portal.
