= Mrs. Robinson =

1968 single by Simon & Garfunkel

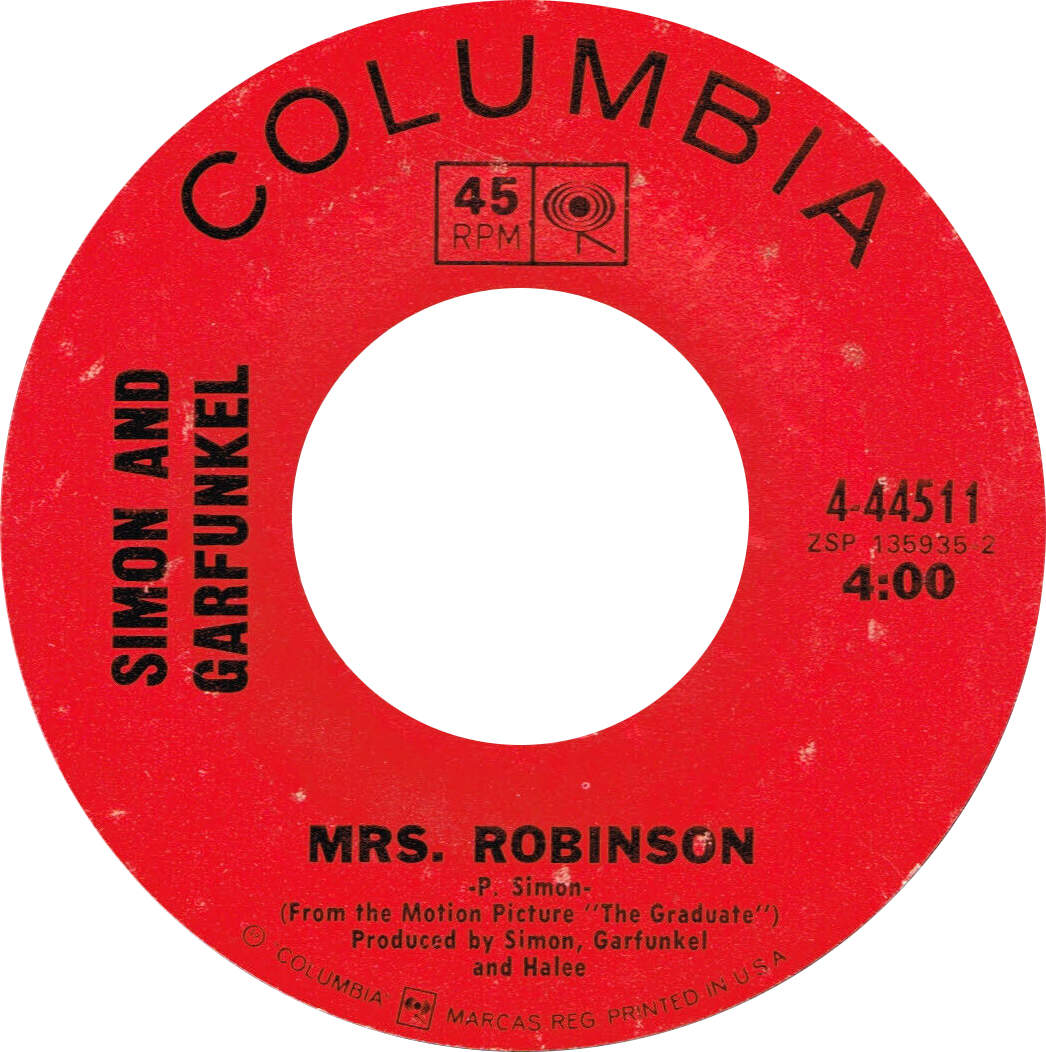
- One of the side-A labels of the US vinyl single crediting The Graduate as the source of the song. Another pressing credits the song's parent album Bookends as the source.

Single by Simon & Garfunkel

from the album Bookends and The Graduate
- B-side: "Old Friends"; "Bookends"
- Released: April 5, 1968
- Recorded: February 2, 1968
- Genre: Folk rock
- Length: 4:02
- Label: Columbia
- Songwriter: Paul Simon
- Producers: Paul Simon; Art Garfunkel; Roy Halee

Simon & Garfunkel singles chronology
"Scarborough Fair/Canticle" (1967)	"Mrs. Robinson" (1968)	"The Boxer" (1969)

Music video
- "Mrs. Robinson" (audio) on YouTube

Alternative release
- Dutch picture sleeve

"Mrs. Robinson" is a song by American folk rock duo Simon & Garfunkel from their fourth studio album, Bookends (1968). The song was written for the 1967 film The Graduate, which contained only fragments of it. The full song was released as a single on April 5, 1968, by Columbia Records. Produced by Simon & Garfunkel and Roy Halee, the song was written by Paul Simon, who offered parts of it to movie director Mike Nichols alongside Art Garfunkel after Nichols rejected two other songs intended for the film. The Graduate's soundtrack album uses two short versions of "Mrs. Robinson". The song was additionally released on the Mrs. Robinson EP in 1968, which also includes three other songs from the film: "April Come She Will", "Scarborough Fair/Canticle", and "The Sound of Silence".

"Mrs. Robinson" became the duo's second chart-topper, reaching No. 1 on the Billboard Hot 100, as well as peaking within the top 10 of the United Kingdom, Ireland, and Spain, among other countries. In 1969, it became the first rock song to win the Grammy Award for Record of the Year. The song contains a famous reference to baseball star Joe DiMaggio. The song has been covered by a number of artists, including Frank Sinatra, the Lemonheads, and Bon Jovi. In 2004, it finished at No. 6 on AFI's 100 Years...100 Songs survey of top tunes in American cinema.

== Background ==
Simon & Garfunkel reached national fame in the United States in 1965–66, touring colleges and releasing a string of hit singles and albums. Meanwhile, director Mike Nichols, then filming The Graduate, became fascinated with two of the duo's songs, listening to them nonstop before and after filming. After two weeks of this obsession, he met with Columbia Records chairman Clive Davis to ask for permission to license Simon & Garfunkel music for his film. Davis viewed it as a perfect fit and envisioned a best-selling soundtrack album. Simon was not as immediately receptive, viewing movies as akin to "selling out", but he agreed to write at least one or two new songs for the film after being impressed by Nichols' wit and the script. Leonard Hirshan, a powerful agent at William Morris, negotiated a deal that paid Simon $25,000 to submit three songs to Nichols and producer Lawrence Turman.

Several weeks later, Simon re-emerged with two new tracks, "Punky's Dilemma" and "Overs", neither of which Nichols was particularly taken with. Nichols asked if the duo had any more songs to offer, and after a break from the meeting, they returned with an early version of "Mrs. Robinson". They had been working on a track titled "Mrs. Roosevelt" (Eleanor Roosevelt), and returned to perform it for Nichols. He was ecstatic about the song, later commenting, "They filled in with dee de dee dee de dee dee dee because there was no verse yet, but I liked even that." Garfunkel later expanded upon the song's placement in The Graduate:

Paul had been working on what is now 'Mrs. Robinson', but there was no name in it and we'd just fill in with any three-syllable name. And because of the character in the picture we just began using the name 'Mrs. Robinson' to fit […] and one day we were sitting around with Mike talking about ideas for another song. And I said 'What about Mrs. Robinson.' Mike shot to his feet. 'You have a song called "Mrs. Robinson" and you haven't even shown it to me?' So we explained the working title and sang it for him. And then Mike froze it for the picture as 'Mrs. Robinson'.

The final version of "Mrs. Robinson" was completed on February 2, 1968, at Columbia Studio A in New York City. The recording was released more than three months after the release of The Graduate, but through its numerous radio plays became an important cross-promotion of the film during its initial run in theaters. A louder and punchier bass drum is present on the promo mix, which was done to accommodate for the limited dynamic range produced by AM radio.

Cash Box called the single version a "booming-beat satire with the glittering vocals and unique lyric material that hallmark the duo's material." Billboard called it an "infectious rhythm ballad". Record World called it "a scather".

== Composition ==
"Mrs. Robinson"
The song contains a famous reference to baseball player Joe DiMaggio.

Simon's inclusion of the phrase "coo-coo-ca-choo" is an homage to a lyric in the Beatles' "I Am the Walrus".

References in the last verse to Joe DiMaggio are perhaps the most discussed. Simon, a fan of Mickey Mantle, was asked during an intermission on The Dick Cavett Show why Mantle was not mentioned in the song instead of DiMaggio. Simon replied, "It's about syllables, Dick. It's about how many beats there are." Simon happened to meet DiMaggio at a New York City restaurant in the 1970s, and the two immediately discussed the song. DiMaggio said "What I don't understand, is why you ask where I've gone. I just did a Mr. Coffee commercial, I'm a spokesman for the Bowery Savings Bank and I haven't gone anywhere!" Simon replied "that I didn't mean the lines literally, that I thought of him as an American hero and that genuine heroes were in short supply. He accepted the explanation and thanked me. We shook hands and said good night". Following DiMaggio’s death in 1999, numerous media outlets ran headlines stating: "Joltin' Joe has left and gone away".

In a New York Times op-ed in March 1999, shortly after DiMaggio's death, Simon discussed this meeting and explained that the line was meant as a sincere tribute to DiMaggio's unpretentious and modest heroic stature, in a time when popular culture magnifies and distorts how we perceive our heroes. He further reflected: "In these days of Presidential transgressions and apologies and prime-time interviews about private sexual matters, we grieve for Joe DiMaggio and mourn the loss of his grace and dignity, his fierce sense of privacy, his fidelity to the memory of his wife and the power of his silence". Simon subsequently performed "Mrs. Robinson" at Yankee Stadium in DiMaggio's honor (leaving out the second verse).

== Awards and nominations ==
"Mrs. Robinson" was awarded two Grammy Awards at the 11th Annual Grammy Awards in 1969. It became the first rock song to win Record of the Year (although the previous year's "Up Up and Away" by the 5th Dimension could also be considered a contender) and it also was awarded the Grammy for Best Contemporary-Pop Performance – Vocal Duo or Group. Simon & Garfunkel were asked to perform the song live at the ceremony, but they declined. Instead, they shot a video for the show set to the music that consisted of them "romping around Yankee Stadium", a reference to the song's lyrics concerning DiMaggio.

Since "Mrs. Robinson" was not written specifically for The Graduate, it was deemed ineligible for the Academy Award for Best Original Song.

In 1999 the 1968 recording of the song on Columbia Records was inducted into the Grammy Hall of Fame.

== Personnel ==
- Paul Simon – acoustic guitars, vocals
- Art Garfunkel – vocals, percussion
- Hal Blaine – drums, congas
- Larry Knechtel – bass

== Charts ==
=== Weekly charts ===
Chart (1968)	Peak position
Argentina (CAPIF)	9
Australia (Kent Music Report)	8
Belgium (Ultratop 50 Flanders)	8
Canada Top Singles (RPM)	1
Finland (Suomen virallinen lista)	32
Netherlands (Dutch Top 40)	8
Netherlands (Single Top 100)	5
New Zealand (Listener)	9
Norway (VG-lista)	8
Switzerland (Schweizer Hitparade)	6
UK Singles (Official Charts)	4
US Billboard Hot 100	1
US Easy Listening (Billboard)	4
US Cash Box Top 100	1
West Germany (GfK)	39

=== Year-end charts ===
Chart (1968)	Position
Canada Top Singles (RPM)	3
UK Singles (OCC)	65
US Billboard Hot 100	9
US Cash Box Top 100	5

== Certifications ==
Region	Certification	Certified units/sales
Denmark (IFPI Danmark)	Gold	45,000^{‡}
Germany (BVMI)	Gold	250,000^{‡}
Italy (FIMI)	Platinum	100,000^{‡}
New Zealand (RMNZ)	2× Platinum	60,000^{‡}
Spain (Promusicae)	Platinum	60,000^{‡}
United Kingdom (BPI)	Platinum	600,000^{‡}
United States (RIAA)	Gold	1,000,000^{^}
^{^} Shipments figures based on certification alone.^{‡} Sales+streaming figures based on certification alone.

== Cover versions ==
=== Frank Sinatra version ===
"Mrs. Robinson"

Single by Frank Sinatra

from the album My Way
- Released: 1969
- Length: 2:56
- Label: Reprise
- Songwriter: Paul Simon
- Producer: Don Costa

Frank Sinatra singles chronology
"If You Go Away" (1969)	"Mrs. Robinson" (1969)

One of the earliest well-known cover versions of this song was by Frank Sinatra for his 1969 album My Way. This version changes a number of lines, including replacing "Jesus" with "Jilly" and including a new verse directly referring to Mrs. Robinson's activities in The Graduate. In The Complete Guide to the Music of Paul Simon and Simon & Garfunkel, Chris Charlesworth writes that Sinatra's change was "senseless", motivated by the refusal of some radio stations to play the song because of the name "Jesus".

=== The Lemonheads version ===
"Mrs. Robinson"

Single by the Lemonheads

from the album It's a Shame About Ray
- B-side: "Being Around"
- Released: November 23, 1992
- Genre: Alternative rock; pop-punk; jangle pop
- Length: 3:43
- Label: Atlantic
- Songwriter: Paul Simon
- Producer: Julian Standen

The Lemonheads singles chronology
"It's a Shame About Ray" (1992)	"Mrs. Robinson" (1992)	"My Drug Buddy" (1993)

American alternative rock band the Lemonheads recorded a punk-inflected cover version of this song in 1992 that made it to No. 18 on the US Billboard Bubbling Under Hot 100, No. 8 on Billboard's Modern Rock Tracks chart, and the top 20 in Australia and New Zealand. In Ireland and the United Kingdom, where the song also reached the top 20, "Mrs. Robinson" was released as a double A-side with "Being Around". Although not originally included on the Lemonheads' album It's a Shame About Ray, the album was re-released with the cover of "Mrs. Robinson" included after the single's chart success.

The band's frontman, Evan Dando, later told American Songwriter that he "hated" the song as well as its author and that its recording was only to promote a 25th anniversary home video release of The Graduate. He noted that Simon greatly disliked the cover, but Garfunkel was more favorable toward it.

==== Charts ====
Chart (1992–1993)	Peak position
Australia (ARIA)	16
Australian Alternative (ARIA)	1
Europe (Eurochart Hot 100)	67
Ireland (IRMA) with "Being Around"	7
New Zealand (Recorded Music NZ)	9
UK Singles (Official Charts) with "Being Around"	19
UK Airplay (Music Week)	21
US Bubbling Under Hot 100 Singles (Billboard)	18
US Modern Rock Tracks (Billboard)	8

==== Certifications ====
Region	Certification	Certified units/sales
United Kingdom (BPI)	Silver	200,000^{‡}
^{‡} Sales+streaming figures based on certification alone.

==== Release history ====
Region	Date	Format(s)	Label(s)	Ref.
United Kingdom	November 23, 1992	7-inch vinyl; 10-inch vinyl; CD; cassette	Atlantic	
Australia	February 21, 1993	CD; cassette	Atlantic	

== In popular culture ==
In early January 2010, after news of Iris Robinson (wife of Northern Ireland First Minister Peter Robinson) having an extramarital affair with the (40 years younger) adult child of a family friend became public, a group was set up on Facebook attempting to get the song "Mrs. Robinson" to No.1 in the Official UK Singles Chart for that week via download sales. It received coverage in The Telegraph and other British media, including coverage in gay-related publications because of the anti-gay principles of the Robinsons.

The song is included in Quentin Tarantino's 2019 film Once Upon a Time in Hollywood. It plays as an homage to The Graduate, in a scene in which Cliff Booth (Brad Pitt) spots the much younger Pussycat (Margaret Qualley). It also appears on the film's soundtrack.

== Bibliography ==
- Bennighof, James (2007). The Words and Music of Paul Simon. Greenwood Publishing Group. ISBN 978-0-275-99163-0 – via Google Books.
- Browne, David (2012). Fire and Rain: The Beatles, Simon and Garfunkel, James Taylor, CSNY, and the Lost Story Of 1970. Da Capo Press. ISBN 978-0-306-82072-4.
- Charlesworth, Chris (1997). "Bridge Over Troubled Water". The Complete Guide to the Music of Paul Simon and Simon & Garfunkel. Omnibus Press. ISBN 978-0-7119-5597-4.
- Ebel, Roswitha (2004). Paul Simon: seine Musik, sein Leben [Paul Simon: His Music, His Life] (in German). epubli. ISBN 978-3-937729-00-8 – via Google Books.
- Eliot, Marc (2010). Paul Simon: A Life. John Wiley and Sons. ISBN 978-0-470-43363-8.
- Fornatale, Pete (2007). Simon and Garfunkel's Bookends. Rodale. ISBN 978-1-59486-427-8.
- Humphries, Patrick (1982). Bookends: The Simon and Garfunkel story. Proteus Books. ISBN 978-0-86276-063-2.
- Kingston, Victoria (2000). Simon & Garfunkel: The Biography. Fromm International. ISBN 978-0-88064-246-0.
