= Come On Feel the Lemonheads =

Studio album by the Lemonheads
- Released: October 12, 1993
- Recorded: 1993
- Genres: Power pop; country rock; folk rock
- Length: 54:36
- Label: Atlantic
- Producer: The Robb Brothers

The Lemonheads chronology
| It's a Shame About Ray (1992) | Come On Feel the Lemonheads (1993) | Car Button Cloth (1996) |

Singles from Come on Feel the Lemonheads
- 1. "Into Your Arms" Released: October 4, 1993; 2. "It's About Time" Released: November 15, 1993; 3. "Big Gay Heart" Released: May 2, 1994; 4. "The Great Big No" Released: 1994

Come On Feel the Lemonheads is the sixth studio album by the American alternative rock band the Lemonheads. It was released on October 12, 1993. Produced by The Robb Brothers, the band lineup consisted of Evan Dando (lead vocals, guitar), Nic Dalton (bass guitar) and David Ryan (drums), along with former bassist Juliana Hatfield singing backing vocals on several tracks. The album was written by Dando and his songwriting partner Tom Morgan. Following the success of their prior album, It's a Shame About Ray, the band had attracted considerable media attention as alternative rock darlings, and some big-name guest musicians appeared on the album as well, including the Go-Go's lead singer Belinda Carlisle and funk musician Rick James. The song "Into Your Arms", a cover version of a song written and recorded previously by Dalton's former band, Love Positions, became the Lemonheads' biggest charting hit.

== Reception ==
Professional ratings
Review scores
| Source | Rating |
|---|---|
| AllMusic | 3.5/5 stars |
| Entertainment Weekly | B+ |
| Los Angeles Times | 2.5/4 stars |
| NME | 9/10 |
| Pitchfork | 7.1/10 |
| Q | 4/5 stars |
| Rolling Stone | 3.5/5 stars |
| Select | 4/5 |
| Uncut | 8/10 |
| The Village Voice | C+ |

Following on from the success of the previous album, It's a Shame About Ray, Come on Feel the Lemonheads reached number 56 on the Billboard 200, making it the Lemonheads' highest ever chart position to date. The album produced the singles "It's About Time", "Big Gay Heart", "The Great Big No" and their highest-charting single, "Into Your Arms", which reached number one on Billboard's Modern Rock Tracks for nine weeks (from November 6, 1993, to January 1, 1994), a record at the time which they shared with U2.

== Track listing ==
All songs written and composed by Evan Dando and Tom Morgan, except as noted.

1. "The Great Big No" – 2:51
2. "Into Your Arms" (Robyn St. Clare) – 2:44
3. "It's About Time" – 2:41
4. "Down About It" – 2:15
5. "Paid to Smile" (Dando) – 2:59
6. "Big Gay Heart" – 4:37
7. "Style" – 2:12
8. "Rest Assured" – 2:32
9. "Dawn Can't Decide" (Nic Dalton, Dando) – 2:18
10. "I'll Do It Anyway" (Dando) (featuring Belinda Carlisle) – 3:34
11. "Rick James Style" – 3:18
12. "Being Around" – 1:48
13. "Favorite T" (Dando) – 2:59
14. "You Can Take It with You" (Dando) – 2:05
15. "The Jello Fund" (Dando) – 15:32
  - Following "The Jello Fund" are several hidden tracks titled "Lenny" (Dalton, Dando, David Ryan), "Noise Parts 1–3", "The Amp Went Out" and "High-Speed Idiot Mode".

== Personnel ==
- Evan Dando – lead vocals, guitar, piano
- Nic Dalton – bass guitar, backing vocals
- David Ryan – drums
- Juliana Hatfield – backing vocals
- Belinda Carlisle – backing vocals on "I'll Do It Anyway"
- Rick James – backing vocals on "Rick James Style"
- Sneaky Pete Kleinow – steel guitar on "Being Around" and "Big Gay Heart"
- Tom Morgan – "guidance counselor" on "You Can Take It with You"

== Charts ==
| Chart (1993) | Peak position |
|---|---|
| Australian Albums (ARIA) | 19 |
| Canada Top Albums/CDs (RPM) | 34 |
| Dutch Albums (Album Top 100) | 56 |
| German Albums (Offizielle Top 100) | 64 |
| New Zealand Albums (RMNZ) | 39 |
| Swedish Albums (Sverigetopplistan) | 26 |
| UK Albums (Official Charts) | 5 |
| US Billboard 200 | 56 |

== Certifications ==
| Region | Certification | Certified units/sales |
|---|---|---|
| United Kingdom (BPI) | Gold | 100,000^{^} |
| United States (RIAA) | Gold | 500,000^{^} |
^{^} Shipments figures based on certification alone.
