= It's a Shame About Ray =

1992 studio album by the Lemonheads

Studio album by Lemonheads
- Released: June 2, 1992
- Recorded: 1991–1992
- Studio: Cherokee (Hollywood)
- Genres: Alternative rock; grunge; pop-punk; jangle pop; folk rock
- Length: 29:46 (original release); 33:28 (re-release); 57:20 (deluxe edition)
- Label: Atlantic
- Producer: The Robb Brothers

Lemonheads chronology
Lovey (1990)	It's a Shame About Ray (1992)	Come on Feel the Lemonheads (1993)

Singles from It's a Shame About Ray
- 1. "It's a Shame About Ray" Released: October 5, 1992; 2. "Mrs. Robinson" Released: November 23, 1992; 3. "My Drug Buddy" Released: 1993; 4. "Confetti" Released: 1993

Professional ratings
Review scores
Source	Rating
AllMusic	4.5/5 stars
Chicago Tribune	3/4 stars
Encyclopedia of Popular Music	4/5 stars
Mojo	5/5 stars
NME	8/10
Pitchfork	8.4/10
Q	4/5 stars
The Rolling Stone Album Guide	4/5 stars
Select	4/5
Uncut	4/5 stars

It's a Shame About Ray is the fifth album by American alternative rock band the Lemonheads, released on June 2, 1992. The album was produced by the Robb Brothers. At the time of principal recording, the band consisted of Evan Dando (lead vocals, guitar), Juliana Hatfield (bass, backing vocals) and David Ryan (drums). Though not originally on the album, the band's cover of Simon & Garfunkel's "Mrs. Robinson" was added to the album in later pressings after it had become a major worldwide radio hit, and it features a later lineup of the band with Nic Dalton on bass.

== History ==
The title track was inspired by a quote that band leader Evan Dando had seen in a Sydney newspaper in November 1991. The newspaper story was about a 15 year old boy named Ray, who had left school in Nowra and moved to Sydney where he was homeless and considering working as a prostitute. The song became an international hit for the band, reaching #31 in the UK Top 100 as well as #5 on the Modern Rock Tracks chart in the U.S. It was later included at #138 on Pitchfork's "Top 200 Tracks of the 90s" list. The music video features Johnny Depp.

Actress Polly Noonan and her car appear on the cover of the album.

=== Rereleases ===
After its initial release, the album was reissued with a cover of the song "Mrs. Robinson", written by Paul Simon and originally recorded by Simon & Garfunkel. The Lemonheads' version was recorded to celebrate the 25th anniversary of the release of the film The Graduate. The band recorded the song in Berlin while on tour, with Nic Dalton on bass guitar. It was released as a single. Also, the song "My Drug Buddy" was later truncated to just "Buddy," but was later restored.

The album was reissued by Rhino in 2008 as a collector's edition that includes several demo versions of album tracks, the B-side song "Shaky Ground" and a DVD containing the previously released (on VHS) Two Weeks in Australia.

=== Notable performances ===
The Lemonheads toured Australia in late 2010, playing the album in its entirety along with songs from their other albums.

The band performed the entire album at London's Shepherd's Bush Empire on September 14–15, 2005, as part of the All Tomorrow's Parties–curated Don't Look Back concert series, with "Mrs. Robinson" missing from the setlist.

The band performed the album in its entirety while opening for certain dates of Jawbreaker's 2022 spring tour.

The Lemonheads toured Australia in May 2025, with the tour being advertised as the band performing both It's A Shame About Ray and the Come On Feel The Lemonheads albums in their entireties. For these performances, the original track listing of the album was performed in sequence.

== Track listing ==
All songs by Evan Dando unless otherwise stated.

1. "Rockin Stroll" - 1:48
2. "Confetti" - 2:47
3. "It's a Shame About Ray" (words: Dando, Tom Morgan; music: Dando) - 3:08
4. "Rudderless" - 3:21
5. "My Drug Buddy"- 2:52
6. "The Turnpike Down" - 2:34
7. "Bit Part" (words: Dando, Morgan; music: Dando) - 1:52
8. "Alison's Starting to Happen" - 2:00
9. "Hannah & Gabi" - 2:41
10. "Kitchen" (Nic Dalton) - 2:55
11. "Ceiling Fan in My Spoon" - 2:00
12. "Frank Mills" (James Rado, Gerome Ragni, Galt MacDermot) - 1:45

Re-release bonus track

"Mrs. Robinson" (Paul Simon) - 3:45

Bonus material

1. "Shaky Ground" (B-side) - 1:49
2. "It's a Shame About Ray" (demo version) - 2:57
3. "Rockin Stroll" (demo version) - 1:49
4. "My Drug Buddy" (demo version) - 2:47
5. "Hannah & Gabi" (demo version) - 2:27
6. "Kitchen" (demo version) - 3:13
7. "Bit Part" (demo version) - 1:55
8. "Rudderless" (demo version) - 3:21
9. "Ceiling Fan in My Spoon" (demo version) - 2:18
10. "Confetti" (demo version) - 1:16

== Personnel ==
The Lemonheads

- Evan Dando – guitar, vocals
- Juliana Hatfield – bass guitar, backup vocals
- David Ryan – drums
- Nic Dalton – bass guitar on "Mrs. Robinson"
- Jeff "Skunk" Baxter – slide guitar on "Hannah & Gabi"

== Charts ==
Chart (1992)	Peak position
Australian Albums (ARIA)	23
UK Albums (Official Charts)	33
US Billboard 200	36

== Certifications ==
Region	Certification	Certified units/sales
Australia (ARIA)	Gold	35,000^{^}
United Kingdom (BPI)	Gold	100,000^{^}
United States (RIAA)	Gold	500,000^{^}
^{^} Shipments figures based on certification alone.
