= Nic Dalton =

- Born: Nicholas James Dalton; 14 November 1964 (age 62); Canberra, Australian Capital Territory, Australia
- Occupations: Musician; record label owner
- Instruments: Guitar; bass guitar; mandolin; Casio MT-65; drums
- Years active: 1983–present
- Label: Half a Cow Citadel Records

Nicholas James "Nic" Dalton (born 14 November 1964) is an Australian multi-instrumentalist and record label owner. He was a member of various Australian bands including The Plunderers (1984–95), Godstar (1991–95) and Sneeze (1991–present); as well as playing with Ratcat and The Hummingbirds. He was the bass guitarist for American band, The Lemonheads in the early 1990s. He also runs the record label Half a Cow, which he co-founded in 1990. His current bands are The Sticker Club and, until recently, the Gloomchasers (who disbanded in November 2019).

== Early bands ==
Nic Dalton was born on 14 November 1964 in Canberra, Australian Capital Territory. He showed an interest in music in his pre-teens and started an informal group with Charlie Owen. One of Dalton's early bands was Girls With Money. He was in a folk-pop group, Get Set Go, with Anthony Hayes (later known as Stevie Plunder) and a pair of sisters, Jenny and Suzie Higgie. Suzie later recalled "down at Commonwealth Park there used to be a tunnel with a power point ... My first band with Nic Dalton and Stevie Plunder...we wrote most of our songs down there".

In January 1984 Dalton on bass guitar and vocals, Plunder on guitar and vocals, and Elmo Reed on drums started the Plunderers. In May 1984, Get Set Go split up and the newly-formed Plunderers asked Lindsay Dunbar to join on drums. There was also a line up that included David Branson on violin and Jacquie Martin on saxophone. In December 1984, Dunbar left and the group went into hiatus while Dalton and Hayes joined cover band, the Gadflys, for six months. The line-up was Dalton on bass guitar, Hayes on guitar, Mick Moriarity on guitar and vocals, his brother Phil Moriarty on clarinet, and Pete Velzen on drums.

In June 1985 Dalton, Velzen and Plunder left the Gadflys and revived the Plunderers. In October of that year they issued a single, "Into The Ice"/"Strange Affection". The group relocated to Melbourne late that year when Andy Lewis joined on keyboards, guitar and harmonies. They moved to Sydney in July 1986. Lewis left the band in 1987. In January 1989 Velzen was replaced by Geoff Milne (ex-Eastern Dark) on drums. The trio also played gigs and released records as Hippy Dribble and Captain Denim. In 1987 Dalton's parents opened a book store, Dalton's Books, in Glebe, Sydney. In late 1989 Dalton and his friend, Miles Ferguson, took over the store, renamed it as Half a Cow and expanded its stock list to include comics, records and T-shirts.

In 1990 Dalton and Ferguson founded a record label, Half a Cow. In 1990 Robyn St Clare, the bass guitarist for the Hummingbirds took leave from that band during her pregnancy, and Dalton filled in during their tour of Australia supporting visiting American band, the Lemonheads. Lemonheads' lead singer, Evan Dando, formed a friendship and musical collaboration with Dalton and his Sneeze bandmate Tom Morgan, and the results of Dando and Morgan's song writing collaboration contributed two songs to the Lemonheads' 1992 album, It's a Shame about Ray and formed much of the Lemonheads' 1993 album, Come on Feel the Lemonheads.

== The Lemonheads ==
It's a Shame About Ray featured Juliana Hatfield on bass and backing vocals, as Dalton was unable to get to the US in time for the album's recording schedule. When Hatfield continued with her solo career, Dando asked Dalton to join the band as its bass player. Dalton agreed, despite having formed the bands Sneeze and Godstar around the same time.

Dalton played with the Lemonheads for two years, and played on the band's 1993 album Come on Feel the Lemonheads. He co-wrote the song "Dawn Can't Decide" with Dando. Most of the remaining songs on the album were written by Dando and Tom Morgan, except for the album's hit single "Into Your Arms", which was written by Robyn St Clare and originally appeared on the Love Positions' Billiepeebup album (a collaboration between Dalton and St Clare released in 1990).

After touring with the Lemonheads for the Come on Feel... album, Dalton left the band in August 1994 and returned to Australia. He rehearsed with Dando and Dinosaur Jr. drummer Murph for the recording of the Car Button Cloth album in 1996, but ultimately decided to decline Dando's offer to remain in the band.

== Solo work and other bands ==
In January 2000, Dalton left Sydney and moved to a farm on the outskirts of the village of Morongla (near Cowra in central west New South Wales) with his girlfriend, writer Lucy Lehmann. He closed the Half A Cow bookshop (in January 1998), but continued to run the record label from the farm, while working on a new album. Dalton and Lehmann ended their relationship in April 2003, and Dalton continued to work on the album, setting himself a deadline of his 40th birthday for its recording. The album, titled Home of the Big Regret, was recorded between July and November 2004 with a folk-rock and bluegrass band Dalton called the Gloomchasers. Despite their break-up, Lehmann remained involved with the album, having co-written several of the songs and writing the liner notes for the album. A second album Play All Night was released in December 2010 and the band continued to play - with a revolving line-up - until November 2019.

Dalton joined Ratcat on bass guitar in 1998.

After a year in Melbourne, Dalton moved back to Sydney in 2006 and formed a new line-up of the Gloomchasers, as well as joining lounge act the Handlebars. In 2011 he formed a "bubblegum band for kids" called The Sticker Club with Alison Galloway, Ben Whitten, Nellie Afford, Damien 'Dizzi' Cassidy and Ruby Firmstone. Their album Scratch 'n Sniff was a joint release by ABC Kids and Half A Cow Records. Dalton also released two albums, in 2015 and 2017, under the name Chewee.

== Documentary ==
Melbourne film maker Jarrad Kennedy is completing a documentary about Dalton, covering his work as a musician and label boss for Half A Cow. If It's Catchy, It Means You Stole It has no set release date.
