= Godstar (song) =

Single by Psychic TV
- Released: 1985
- Genre: Psychedelic pop; bubblegum pop
- Length: 3:42
- Label: Temple Records
- Songwriters: Genesis P-Orridge; Alex Fergusson
- Producers: Genesis P-Orridge; Ken Thomas

Music video
- "Godstar" (Official Video + Interview) on YouTube

Godstar is the name of a song and several releases by Psychic TV in 1985. The releases feature the band The Angels of Light. Two compilations, Godstar: Thee Director's Cut and Godstar: The Singles - Pt. 2, were later released. The song was about the life of Rolling Stones founder Brian Jones. The song was covered by Television Personalities on their album Don't Cry Baby, It's Only A Movie.

== Catalogue numbers ==
- 12" vinyl: TOPYH 009
- 12" vinyl picture disc: TOPIC 009
- 7" vinyl: TOPY 009
- 2x7" vinyl: TOPYS 009

== Album notes ==
"Godstar" was advertised as the theme song for the forthcoming feature film of the same name about the life of Brian Jones. The mentioned film has not been released since, and is unlikely to exist.

== Track listing ==
=== 12" vinyl and 12" vinyl picture disc ===
Side A

1. "Godstar (Hyperdelic Mix)"

Side B

1. "Godstar (California Mix)"

=== 7" vinyl ===
Side A

1. "Godstar"

Side B

1. "Godstar (B.J. Mix)"

=== 2x7" vinyl ===
Side A

1. "Godstar"

Side B

1. "Godstar (BJ Mix)"

Side C

1. "Discopravity (Fish Mix)"

Side D

1. "Yes It's The B Side"

== Charts ==
Chart (1986)	Peak position
UK Singles (OCC)	67
UK Indie	1
