= The Lemonheads =

American alternative rock band

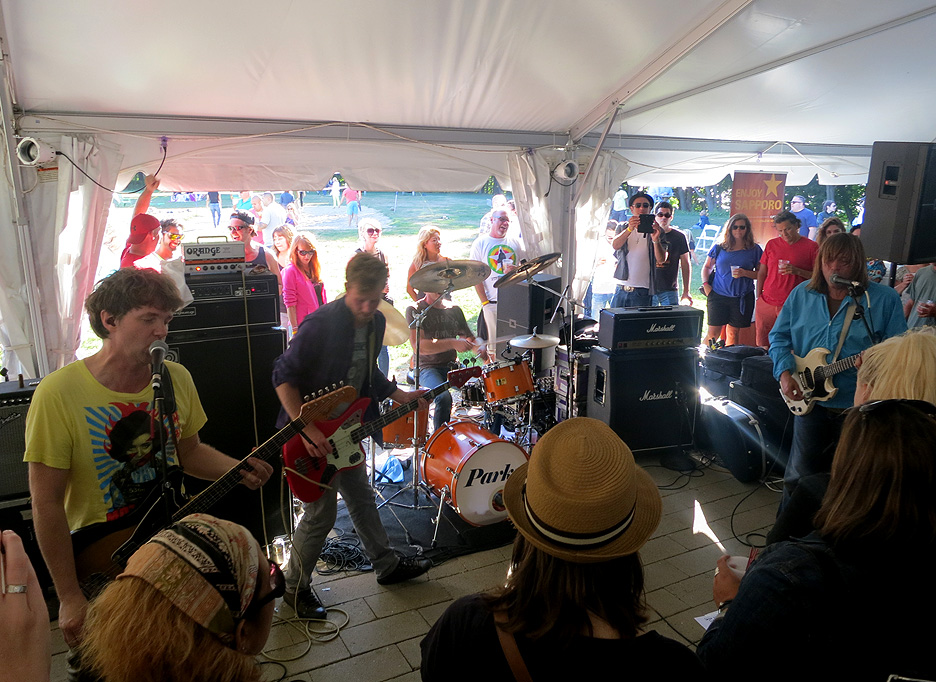
- The Lemonheads in 2014

Background information
- Origin: Boston, Massachusetts, U.S.
- Genres: Alternative rock; grunge; pop-punk; jangle pop; power pop
- Works: The Lemonheads discography
- Years active: 1986–1997; 2005–present
- Labels: Taang!; Atlantic; TAG; Vagrant; The End; Fire
- Members: Evan Dando
- Past members: Vess Ruhtenberg; Corey Loog Brennan; John Strohm; Jeff Furtaw; Doug Trachten; Jesse Peretz; Devon Ashley; Nic Dalton; David Ryan; George Berz; Xan Aird; Bill Gibson; Patrick Murphy; Ben Daughtry; Byron Hoagland; Josh Lattanzi; John Kent; Mark "Budola" Newman; Karl Alvarez; Bill Stevenson; P. David Hazel; Kenny Lyon; Mark Cutsinger; Ben Deily; Juliana Hatfield; Chip Dalby
- Website: thelemonheads.net

The Lemonheads are an American alternative rock band formed in Boston in 1986 by Evan Dando, Ben Deily, and Jesse Peretz. Dando has remained the band's only constant member. After their initial punk-influenced releases and tours as an independent/college rock band in the late 1980s, the Lemonheads' popularity with a mass audience grew in 1992 with the major label album It's a Shame about Ray, which was produced, engineered, and mixed by the Robb Brothers (Bruce Robb, Dee, and Joe). This was followed by a cover of Simon and Garfunkel's "Mrs. Robinson", which eventually became one of the band's most successful singles. The Lemonheads were active until 1997 before going on hiatus, but reformed with a new lineup in 2005 and released The Lemonheads the following year. The band released its latest album, Love Chant, in October 2025

Since its formation, recording and touring lineups of the band have included co-founders Deily and Peretz, John Strohm (Blake Babies), Doug Trachten, Corey Loog Brennan, Byron Hoagland (Folks on Fire), Ben Daughtrey (Squirrel Bait), Juliana Hatfield (Blake Babies), Nic Dalton (Godstar, Sneeze, the Plunderers), David Ryan (Fuzzy), Patrick "Murph" Murphy (Dinosaur Jr.), George Berz (Dinosaur Jr., Gobblehoof), Josh Lattanzi, Bill Gibson (the Eastern Dark), Mark 'Budola' Newman, Kenny Lyon, Vess Ruhtenberg, Devon Ashley, Karl Alvarez and Bill Stevenson (Descendents), P. David Hazel, Farley Glavin, Chip Dalby and various others.

== History ==
=== Early years (1986–1991) ===
Evan Dando, Ben Deily and Jesse Peretz formed the Lemonheads as teenagers at the Commonwealth School in Boston. The band was originally called the Whelps, until inspiration came from a brand of candy, which Dando noted was "sweet on the inside and sour on the outside." The band recorded and self-released the 7-inch EP Laughing All the Way to the Cleaners. The band's first show was played on August 19, 1986.

After high school, Dando enrolled at Skidmore College but could not maintain his grades and dropped out to pursue a musical career. Having signed to local label Taang! Records, the Lemonheads released the albums Hate Your Friends (1987), Creator (1988), and Lick (1989) with Deily and Dando sharing lead vocals and songwriting duties. Initially they also shared lead guitar and drumming duties as well, but when this became unworkable, they hired drummers such as Doug Trachten, John Strohm, and Mark Natola to fill in the lineup. As all three albums were compiled from various recording sessions from 1986 onward, the lineups on each album varied considerably from song to song. The band enjoyed a good deal of college radio airplay and were popular in the burgeoning indie rock scene, up until Deily left the band in 1989. Dando then recruited David Ryan on drums, and Corey Loog Brennan as a second guitarist, and signed to major label Atlantic Records, releasing the album Lovey in August 1990. Straddling punk rock, country music and heavy metal, Lovey was released a year before the commercial explosion of grunge, and failed to chart or produce any songs with serious airplay.

=== Breakthrough and height of fame (1992–1997) ===
Dando cut his losses and flew to Australia to write some songs with friends Nic Dalton and Tom Morgan. These songs formed the basis for It's a Shame about Ray, the Lemonheads' breakthrough album. In the intervening time, Jesse Peretz had left music, and had taken up a career in photography and film; he would remain as the band photographer, and would eventually go on to direct music videos, TV shows, and feature films. Replacing Peretz in the band was Juliana Hatfield, who provided bass and backing vocals. Hatfield would leave the band shortly after recording the album to found her own band, the Juliana Hatfield Three, and would be replaced on bass by Nic Dalton. A cover of "Mrs. Robinson" (recorded to promote the video release and the 25th anniversary of The Graduate) was released as a single and got them the most exposure they had had so far. This cover was also used in the film Wayne's World 2 and in Martin Scorsese's 2013 film The Wolf of Wall Street. When the Ray album was reissued, the track was tacked on to the end. The band enjoyed some success on college radio as well as mainstream exposure. The title track, "It's a Shame About Ray", also saw commercial success. Despite the popularity of grunge, Dando confounded fans and his own mother by dialing down the amps on the album, he told Guitar World writer Jim Beaugez: "We were going for an AM radio sort of sound. It sounded really different; it stuck out at the time. My mom was like, 'What are you doing? Your kind of music has gotten really popular. Why are you changing it?' She was worried." During 1992–1993, Dando's face graced many magazine covers, and he was included in People's 50 Most Beautiful People list.

Now consisting of Dando, Dalton, and Ryan, the band officially renamed themselves from "Lemonheads" to "The Lemonheads" prior to the release of Come on Feel the Lemonheads in October 1993. Though no longer playing bass, Hatfield did appear as a backing singer on many of the tracks. The album also featured guest appearances by steel guitarist Sneaky Pete Kleinow and singers Belinda Carlisle and Rick James. This was a successful album with tracks such as "Big Gay Heart" and "It's About Time." The band enjoyed modest mainstream success, this time with the single "Into Your Arms" (their highest charting UK hit to date). Writer Robyn St. Clare made the first recording of this song in 1990 as part of Love Positions with Nic Dalton.

Dando befriended Oasis and appeared at the band's live shows. The cracks were beginning to show, and after one particularly disjointed interview with Dando almost unable to speak, having lost his voice after smoking crack cocaine, he admitted to having a drug problem. The band went on hiatus and Dando went into rehab.

In 1996, Dando re-formed the Lemonheads with a completely new lineup, including drummer Murph (formerly of Dinosaur Jr.), bassist Bill Gibson (formerly of The Eastern Dark), and guitarist John Strohm (formerly of the Blake Babies; Strohm had also played drums with the Lemonheads during their early years). This band produced another Lemonheads album, Car Button Cloth. While featuring jangly guitar songs such as "If I Could Talk I'd Tell You," this set also showed off the darker side of Dando's writing.

The band contributed to Schoolhouse Rock! Rocks, a 1996 tribute album for Schoolhouse Rock! creator Thomas G. Yohe, which contained remakes of many popular Schoolhouse Rock! songs – the Lemonheads offered their take on "My Hero Zero." Previously, the band had contributed to a Kiss tribute album, recording Kiss' 1977 song "Plaster Caster" for Kiss My Ass: Classic Kiss Regrooved (1994).

The band toured successfully in 1997 and played a final gig at the UK's Reading Festival. Following a cameo line in the BBC's all-star cover version of Lou Reed's "Perfect Day" (which reached number one in the UK Singles Chart), Dando continued to play live solo shows.

=== Hiatus (1998–2004) ===
Atlantic released The Best of the Lemonheads in August 1998. Through 1998 and 2004 Evan Dando undertook some solo tours performing the band's songs but an official reunion was never confirmed. During this time, Dando released a live album Live at the Brattle Theatre in 2001, and a solo album in 2003, titled Baby I'm Bored. He also co-wrote the song "The Last High" with Courtney Taylor-Taylor of the Dandy Warhols for the album Welcome to the Monkey House by the Dandy Warhols.

=== Reunion (2005–present) ===
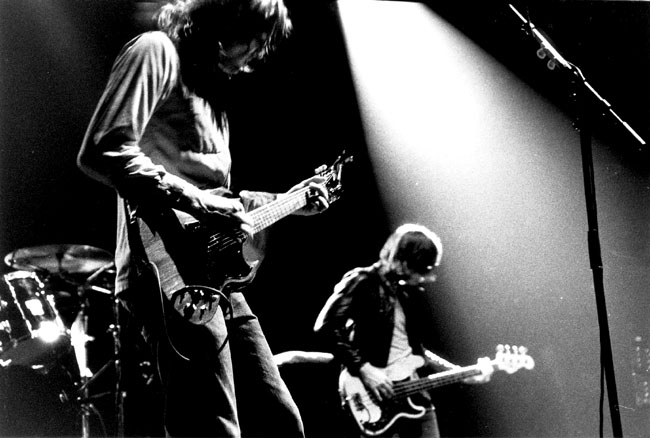
The Lemonheads at Shepherd's Bush Empire, September 2005

After a nine-year hiatus, the band reformed in the summer of 2005 with a recording lineup bolstered by Bill Stevenson and Karl Alvarez, members of Descendents. The live lineup during this period fluctuated, with Stevenson and George Berz (Dinosaur Jr.) both sitting in on drums during 2005, while Josh Lattanzi—chiefly known for his work with Ben Kweller—has frequently taken on bass duties for live shows.

On September 14 and 15, 2005, Dando, Stevenson and Lattanzi performed two shows at Shepherd's Bush Empire in London as part of the ATP Don't Look Back series, where they played It's a Shame About Ray in its entirety.

In April 2006, the Lemonheads were signed to Vagrant Records. The album, simply titled The Lemonheads, was released on September 26, 2006, in the United States and one day earlier in the UK; the album featured special guests Garth Hudson and J Mascis on select tracks. To promote the album Dando toured the UK, Europe and US in late 2006 with a band consisting of Vess Ruhtenberg (bass) and Devon Ashley (drums) of the Pieces. In the US, they toured with Vietnam and Hymns (band) as support. The same lineup toured again in 2007 and 2008. The recording lineup of Dando, Alvarez and Stevenson played live for the first time together on a 20-date US tour in late 2007.

While the Lemonheads reformed, co-founder Deily received a degree from Harvard University. He currently works as an Associate Creative Director in the advertising industry. His power pop/punk band, Varsity Drag, completed a 25-city European tour during January and February 2007, performing their own material alongside several Deily compositions from the first four Lemonheads releases. Varsity Drag continues to perform periodically in the Boston Area.

A deluxe reissue of Lemonheads' 1992 album It's a Shame About Ray was released in March 2008 (US) and April 2008 (UK) on Rhino Records, which features demos, B-sides and a DVD issue of the previously VHS-only Two Weeks In Australia, featuring footage from the band's Australian tour in the wake of their breakthrough album's release. To promote the reissue, the lineup of Dando, Ruhtenberg and Ashley performed the album in full at a number of gigs between March and May 2008. Later in 2008 the band toured again in Europe with Vess Ruhtenberg and P. David Hazel (drums) of Beta Male.

On April 23, 2008, at the inaugural NME US Awards ceremony at the El Rey in Los Angeles, Dando received the classic album award for It's A Shame About Ray, and also performed "My Drug Buddy" and the album's title track acoustically. According to reports, soon after receiving the award, Dando deposited it into a garbage can, telling a minder "I don't want this".

On June 23, 2009, the Lemonheads released Varshons – a collection of eleven covers, including tracks by Gram Parsons, Wire, GG Allin, and Christina Aguilera. The album also featured actress Liv Tyler performing a duet on Leonard Cohen's "Hey That's No Way To Say Goodbye". Despite several websites reporting a release date of September 13, 2008, the album was not released on this date. Later, in a blog post on the band's MySpace page, Dando hinted at a March 2009 release. On March 27, 2009, it was announced that Varshons would be released on June 23 on The End Records.

In an August 2007 interview, drummer Bill Stevenson stated that he was going to produce the Lemonheads' ninth album of original material. As of August 2010, however, announcements of a new album have not yet been released.

In September 2010 the Lemonheads announced an Australian tour playing all thirteen songs from the 1992 album It's a Shame about Ray, plus a selection of songs from other albums.

On February 7, 2012, the Lemonheads will release Hotel Sessions on Hall of Records/Breath of Saltwater – an intimate recording documenting a Sunday night that Evan Dando spent recording new songs with just an acoustic guitar (and some revealing commentary) in a hotel room in Bondi Beach, Australia. The 14 songs include some that never made it to an official Lemonheads album, but Dando says, "the "Into Your Arms" I did here is better than the one on the album (I like it anyway)."

The Lemonheads completed a 9-week U.S. tour in spring of 2012 playing all thirteen songs from the 1992 album It's a Shame about Ray, plus a selection of songs from other albums. Lead singer Evan Dando recruited drummer Chuck Treece and former Taking Back Sunday lead guitarist Fred Mascherino to play bass.

Juliana Hatfield rejoined the Lemonheads for a late 2012 tour supporting the Psychedelic Furs.

On September 17, 2012, Ryan Adams tweeted that he would be playing drums on a new 'punker sounding' Lemonheads album as well as producing it. He also announced that Evan Dando would be joined on the record by Juliana Hatfield and, for the first time since 1989's Lick, co-founder and original co-songwriter Ben Deily. Like the earlier Bill Stevenson produced sessions, however, no album was released.

The Lemonheads played a seven-date tour in Ireland and the UK in October 2015.

On August 14, 2017, Atlantic Records divested the Lemonheads' back catalog to Fire Records, which released several of the band's albums in the UK.

A second album of covers (the band's first album in a decade), titled Varshons 2, was released in 2019.

In September 2025, a performance by the Lemonheads at the Vintage Industrial Bar in Zagreb, Croatia, was cut short after frontman Evan Dando left the stage mid-set. The Croatian newspaper Jutarnji list described the show as disorganized and reported that Dando appeared visibly distressed and smashed stage equipment before ending the concert.

In November 2026, the band announced Townesville, a covers album dedicated to songs written by Townes Van Zandt. The album is set to be released on January 22, 2027.

== Musical style ==
Musically, the band has been classified as alternative rock, grunge, jangle pop, power pop, and pop-punk.

== Personnel ==
During the earliest years, the band consisted of Evan Dando, Ben Deily, and Jesse Peretz. Dando and Deily shared singing and songwriting duties; when recording or performing live each would sing and play guitar on their own compositions while the other would play drums. When the arrangement became unworkable, they hired additional drummers including Doug Trachten and John Strohm. On most of the first three albums (released by independent label TAANG!), songs from various recording sessions and live tracks are mixed, so instrumentation varies considerably from track-to-track depending on who was in the band when the tracks were recorded. CD versions of these albums were also released with bonus tracks from even later lineups of the band.

When Deily quit the band in 1989, Dando replaced him with guitarist Corey Loog Brennan and drummer Mark Natola. Natola would be replaced by drummer David Ryan prior to the band's first major label album, Lovey. Following the recording of Lovey, founding bass player Jesse Peretz left the band to pursue a career in photography and filmmaking, and Brennan left to concentrate on his career as a college professor.

On their breakout album, It's a Shame About Ray, Juliana Hatfield had joined on bass guitar and backing vocals. She would remain the backing vocalist for the follow-up album Come on Feel the Lemonheads, but would be replaced on bass guitar by Nic Dalton. John Strohm, who had previously played drums with the band during their early years, toured with the band as a second guitarist in support of these albums.

Starting with 1996's Car Button Cloth and continuing through the present, the band membership has been fluid, with the name the Lemonheads generally being used by whomever Evan Dando had recruited to record and/or play with at the time. Their last official release was 2019's collection of cover songs Varshons 2, which followed on from their prior release, 2009's Varshons. Several announcements of albums of new material or tours involving any number of musicians have been announced over the years since then, most recently a 2012 project involving Ben Deily, Juliana Hatfield, and Ryan Adams, but as yet no major recordings or substantial tours have materialized.

Below is an approximate timeline of membership in the Lemonheads. Other than Evan Dando, the band has rarely had a stable lineup. The timeline below shows only members which were primary recording or touring members. It does not include guest musicians, or ephemeral lineups which only appeared on stage under the Lemonheads moniker for one-off shows or brief appearances. Dates of membership are approximate based on known shows and recordings.

Current members

- Evan Dando – vocals (1986–present), guitar (1986–present), drums (1986–1989)
- Farley Glavin – bass (2014–present)
- John Kent – drums (2023–present)

Former members

- Ben Deily – vocals (1986–1989), guitar (1986–1989), drums (1986–1989)
- Jesse Peretz – bass (1986–1991)
- Doug Trachten – drums (1987)
- Mark Natola – drums (1989)
- Mark Newman – drums (1989)
- Corey "Loog" Brennan – guitar (1989–1991)
- Juliana Hatfield - bass (1991–1992, 2012), backing vocals (1991–1993, 2012)
- David Ryan – drums (1989–1994)
- Nic Dalton – bass (1992–1994)
- John Strohm – guitar (1994–1997), drums (1988)
- Patrick "Murph" Murphy – drums (1996–1998)
- Bill Gibson – bass (1996–1998)
- Bill Stevenson– drums (2005–2007)
- Karl Alvarez – bass (2005–2007)
- Devon Ashley – drums (2008–2010)
- Vess Ruhtenberg – bass (2008–2010)

== Discography ==
Studio albums

- Hate Your Friends (1987)
- Creator (1988)
- Lick (1989)
- Lovey (1990)
- It's a Shame About Ray (1992)
- Come on Feel the Lemonheads (1993)
- Car Button Cloth (1996)
- The Lemonheads (2006)
- Varshons (2009)
- Varshons 2 (2019)
- Love Chant (2025)

== See also ==
- All
- Black Flag
- Bullet LaVolta
- Smudge
