= Evan Dando =

American rock musician

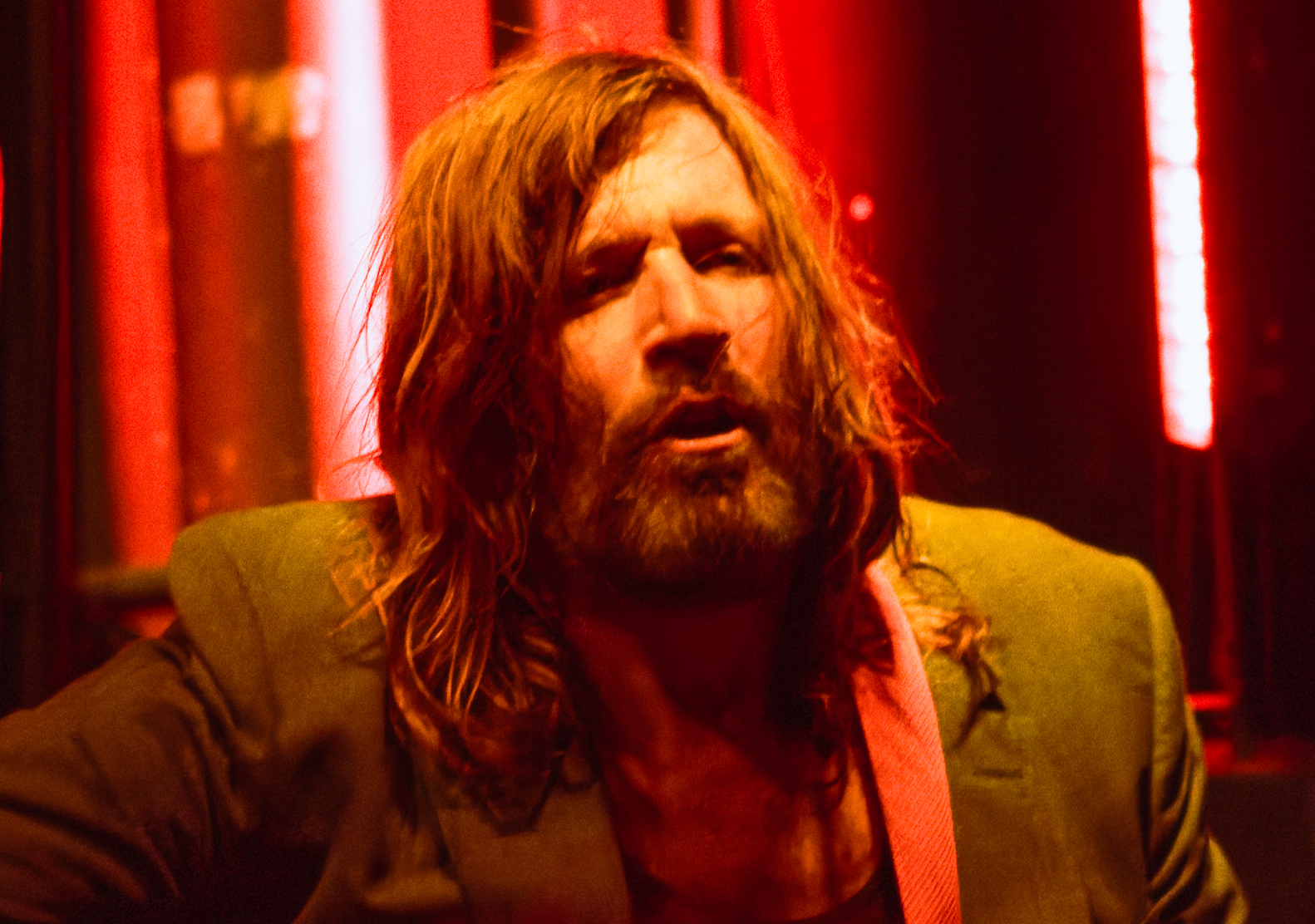
- Evan Dando in 2025

Background information
- Born: Evan Griffith Dando; March 4, 1967 (age 59); Essex, Massachusetts, U.S.
- Origin: Boston, Massachusetts, U.S.
- Genres: Alternative rock; punk rock; country rock
- Occupations: Singer; musician; songwriter
- Instruments: Vocals; guitar
- Years active: 1986–present
- Label: Bar/None
- Spouse: Elizabeth Moses (m. 2000; div. 2010) Antonia Teixeira (m. 2024)

Evan Griffith Dando (born March 4, 1967) is an American musician and the frontman of the rock band the Lemonheads. He has also embarked on a solo career and collaborated on songs with various artists. In December 2015, Dando was inducted into the Boston Music Awards Hall of Fame.

== Early life and education ==
Dando was born in Essex, Massachusetts, on Boston's North Shore, to Susan, a former fashion model, and Jeffrey, who worked as a real estate attorney. At the age of nine, his family moved from Essex to Boston; his parents divorced two years later. In his teens Dando attended Commonwealth School in Boston. In the fall of 1986 he enrolled at Skidmore College but dropped out after getting "four Fs and a D."

== Career ==
=== The Lemonheads ===
While at Commonwealth, Dando met Ben Deily and Jesse Peretz, and in 1986 they formed the Whelps before changing their name to Lemonheads, like that of the candy manufactured by Ferrara Pan. The Lemonheads debuted at the Meltdown House in Cambridge on July 18, 1986, followed by a show at The Rat on August 19. The band recorded an EP, Laughing All the Way to the Cleaners, which got the attention of Taang! Records, a local label. The Lemonheads' first three albums, Hate Your Friends, Creator, and Lick, were all released on Taang!

Following the third album, Dando left the group briefly after some tension with Deily, and joined Juliana Hatfield's band Blake Babies. However, he returned as a drummer when The Lemonheads' cover of Suzanne Vega's song "Luka" became successful, and the group had an opportunity to tour Europe. Deily, however, quit the band shortly before the tour, and Dando replaced him as the guitarist and lead vocalist. Dando brought in David Ryan on drums, and the group signed with Atlantic Records, releasing the album Lovey in 1990.

Dando spent some time in Australia to write songs with friends Nic Dalton and Tom Morgan, who later started the band Sneeze. Some of his songs formed the basis for The Lemonheads' fifth album, It's a Shame About Ray. In 1992, The Lemonheads recorded a punk-inflected cover of Simon and Garfunkel's hit "Mrs. Robinson" to help promote the VHS release of The Graduate for the film's 25th anniversary. The song reached number 19 on the UK Singles Chart in December 1992, and was included in the album's re-release as a bonus track. Dando initially disliked the song's inclusion on the album, feeling like he was tricked by his label, who asked him to record it. After seeing the track being played in Martin Scorsese's The Wolf of Wall Street, however, his opinions towards the track changed. Dando's face appeared on several magazine covers, and People listed him among the "50 Most Beautiful People". In an interview with Q magazine, he admitted he smoked crack cocaine and regretted it. In late 1993, the group released the album Come on Feel the Lemonheads, which featured singles "It's About Time", "Big Gay Heart", and "Into Your Arms". During the group's touring in 1994, Dando befriended Oasis and appeared at some of their live shows. He also made a cameo appearance at the end of the 1994 film Reality Bites.

Dando re-formed The Lemonheads with former member John Strohm on guitar, Bill Gibson, former bassist of Australian band The Eastern Dark, and Patrick Murphy, a former member of Dinosaur Jr., on drums. The group released the album Car Button Cloth in 1996. In 1997 the band went on tour and played its final gig at the Reading Festival, after which the band went on hiatus.

In 2005, Dando put together a new lineup for The Lemonheads which included Karl Alvarez and Bill Stevenson, formerly of the Descendents. In April 2006, they signed with Vagrant Records, and released a self-titled album in September. Dando also had a lineup which included bassist Vess Ruhtenberg and drummer Devon Ashley of the Pieces where they toured the UK, Europe and the United States. In late 2007, Alvarez and Stevenson toured with Dando for the first time live on the US tour. In 2008, he toured with Ruhtenberg and Ashley to promote the re-release of a deluxe version of It's a Shame About Ray, and then toured with Ruhtenberg and drummer P. David Hazel of Beta Male for a European Tour. On April 23, 2008, at the inaugural NME US Awards ceremony held at the El Rey in Los Angeles, Dando received a Classic Album award for It's a Shame About Ray, although Entertainment Weekly reported that he threw the award in the garbage offstage, and then returned to perform "Ray" and "My Drug Buddy".

In 2009 the Lemonheads released Varshons, a collection of 11 covers, including tracks originally recorded by Gram Parsons, Wire, GG Allin, Christina Aguilera; the album featured vocal performances by actress Liv Tyler and model Kate Moss. For many of the tours since 2010, The Lemonheads have included the entire It's a Shame About Ray album on the setlist.

=== Solo career and collaborations ===
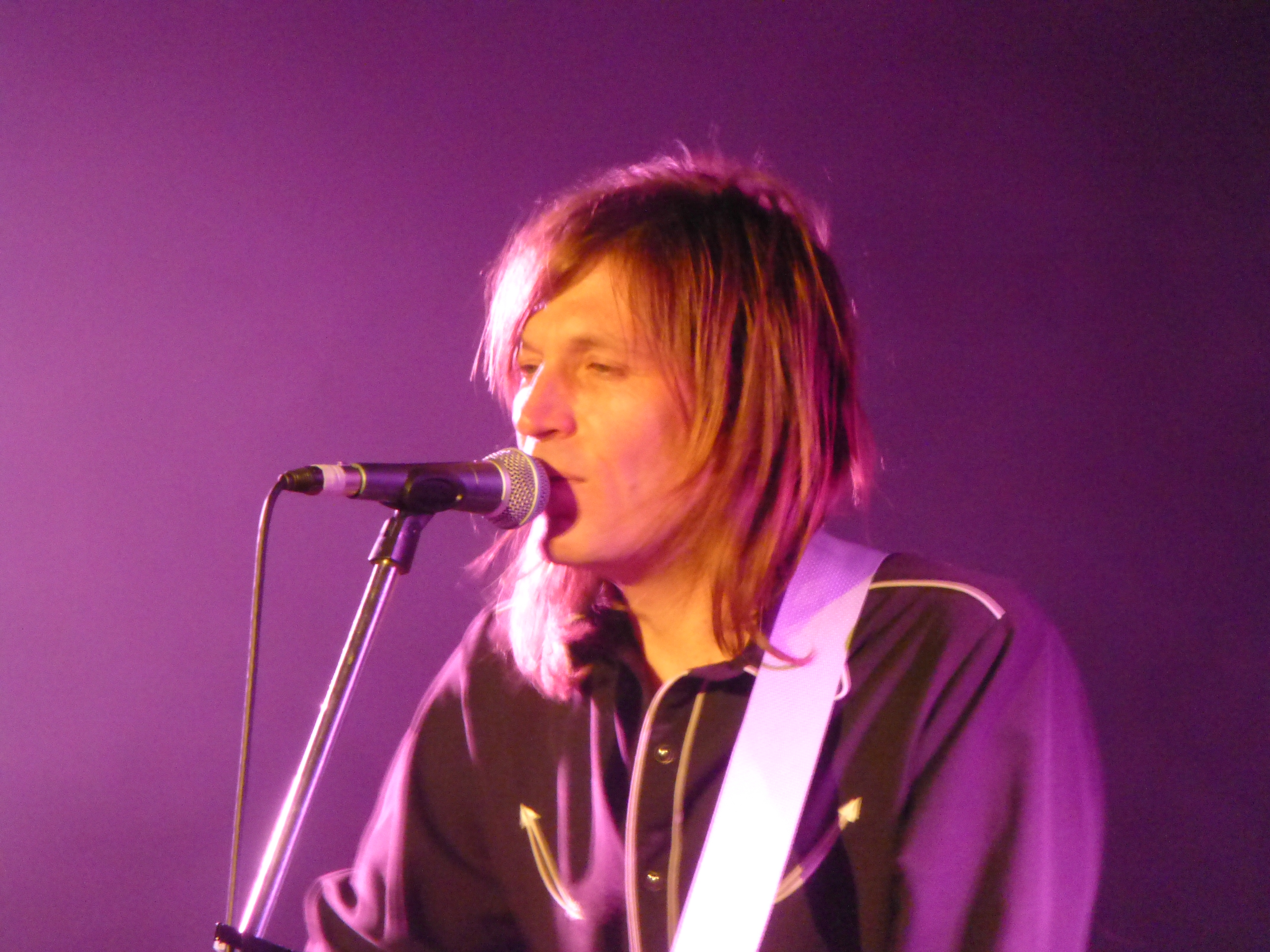
Dando in 2014

Dando worked with Australian musicians Nic Dalton and Tom Morgan, both of whom have been involved with The Lemonheads. In Sydney, he joined Dalton, Morgan, and a number of Half A Cow artists on a self-titled album by the band Sneeze and the album Coastal by Godstar. Dando participated in the Australian band the Givegoods, which featured Paul Dempsey of Something for Kate.

Dando has worked regularly with Juliana Hatfield where he appeared on several Blake Babies songs and she in turn played with The Lemonheads. In Blake Babies, Dando wrote on tracks and provided supporting music and vocals on the Slow Learner album, released in 1989. He also collaborated on Hatfield's album Hey Babe, released in 1994. In 1999, he recorded a duet with Hatfield for the 1999 album, Return of the Grievous Angel: A Tribute to Gram Parsons. The two sang Gram Parsons' "$1000 Wedding". Their long-time relationship inspired a line in the Barenaked Ladies' song "Jane": "No promises as vague as heaven. No Juliana next to my Evan". In late 2000, Dando sang with the Blake Babies and played some acoustic shows with them. In 2011, Dando and Hatfield paired up again for a series of live performances.

In 1995, he had a small role in James Mangold's indie film Heavy, and contributed two cover songs to the soundtrack. In June 1995, Dando's collaboration with English singer-songwriter Kirsty MacColl, a cover of "Perfect Day", was released; the single peaked at number 75 on the UK Singles Chart a week after release.

During an acoustic world tour in early 2001, Dando garnered renewed interest in his back catalog. With touring musicians Ben Lee and Ben Kweller, he performed a mix of Lemonheads songs and solo songs. His performance at the Brattle Theatre in Cambridge on October 18, 2000, was recorded and officially released in the fall of 2001 as Live at the Brattle Theatre; the album was packaged with an additional disc, an EP titled Griffith Sunset that featured covers of country songs.

In February 2003 Dando released his first solo album, Baby I'm Bored, which reached the top 40 of the UK Albums chart.

In 2004, Dando performed as the lead vocalist for the band MC5 on a 41-show tour. He has collaborated with The Dandy Warhols and soundtrack composer Craig Armstrong. At the All Tomorrow's Parties' Don't Look Back festival, Dando played several live dates, including a full performance of the It's A Shame About Ray album.

In 2015, Dando played solo shows in the United States and Europe.

== Personal life ==
Actress Bijou Phillips claimed that Dando took her virginity in 1995, when Bijou was 15 years old and Dando was 27 or 28 years old.

While taking a break from making music with/as the Lemonheads, Dando met English model and musician Elizabeth Moses in 1998; they married two years later. Moses contributed photography to Dando's albums Live at the Brattle Theatre and Baby I'm Bored as well as the Lemonheads' 2006 eponymous album and its 2009 follow-up, Varshons, on which her backing vocals can be heard on the song "Fragile." Moses and Dando separated in 2010.

Dando moved to Brazil in 2023 with his girlfriend, Brazilian videomaker Antonia Teixeira, daughter of the Brazilian folk singer Renato Teixeira. They married on December 30, 2024, and he is the stepfather of her three children.

In 2025 he released the memoir Rumors of My Demise.

In February 2026, a fan accused Dando of sending her unsolicited masturbation videos. Dando was immediately hospitalized for mental treatment. Later that week, two more women accused Dando of sexually harassing them with unsolicited explicit videos since 2016.

== Legacy ==
Dando has been mentioned in songs by several musicians.

- Ben Lee wrote a tribute song called "I Wish I Was Him"
- Dntel's "This is the Dream of Evan and Chan" is about a dream Ben Gibbard had about Dando and Cat Power's Chan Marshall
- Frequent Dando collaborator Tom Morgan mentions "[his] Rock 'n Roll Friend Evan" in Smudge's 1991 single "Don't Want to Be Grant McLennan"
- Kimya Dawson mentions Dando in her song "The Beer"
- The 1994 song "Jane" by Barenaked Ladies contains a lyric that refers to Dando and Juliana Hatfield
- Dando's name appears in Bret Easton Ellis's novel Glamorama (1998).
- The Television Personalities have a song called "Evan Doesn't Ring Me Anymore".
- In the "My Valentine Episode" of The Goldbergs, Luke Eisner played a young Evan Dando who joined Erica Goldberg's band the Dropouts before leaving to join the Lemonheads. Evan Dando himself cameoed in the episode as a townie who bought beer for underage children.

== Discography ==
=== Albums ===
- Live at the Brattle Theatre/Griffin Sunset EP (2001)
- Baby I'm Bored (2003) (UK #30)

=== Singles ===
- "Perfect Day" (1995, with Kirsty MacColl) (UK #75)
- "Stop My Head" (2003) (UK #38)
- "It Looks Like You" (2003) (UK #68)
