= The Eastern Dark =

- Origin: Australia
- Genres: Australian rock
- Years active: 1984–1986
- Labels: Waterfront, Half A Cow

The Eastern Dark was an Australian rock band who formed in the 1980s as an offshoot from another Australian band, The Celibate Rifles.

== History ==
The band was formed in 1984 when then Celibate Rifles bassist James Darroch decided to leave and form his own band. Darroch switched from bass to guitar and enlisted drummer Geoff Milne and former Lime Spiders backing vocalist Bill Gibson on bass. After some rehearsals the three became The Eastern Dark, named after a place in The Phantom comics. The three piece began playing live in May 1984, quickly garnering local support and earning notoriety for their habit of opening each set with a different Ramones cover, working their way chronologically through the Ramones' discography. Their first single, "Julie Is A Junkie/Johnny And Dee Dee," was released on Waterfront Records in July 1985.

With Rob Younger as producer the band recorded the EP Long Live The New Flesh! in 1986. On 4 March 1986, days after finishing the EP, and en route to a week-long series of shows in Melbourne, the band's van went off the road; Darroch was killed, and Milne and Gibson were hospitalised. Long Live the New Flesh! was released posthumously later that year, and a collection of live recordings and demos was released as Girls on the Beach (With Cars) in 1989. A CD collection of the previously released material, Where Are All the Single Girls? was released on Half A Cow Records in 2000 (and re-released in 2010).

== Members ==
- James Darroch - vocals, guitar (1984-1986; his death)
- Bill Gibson - bass (1984-1986)
- Geoff Milne - drums (1984-1986)

== Discography ==
- Julie Is A Junkie/Johnny And Dee Dee [7"] (1985)
- Long Live the New Flesh! [EP] (1986)
- Girls on the Beach (With Cars) [2xLP] (1990)
- Where Are All the Single Girls? [CD] (2000)
