= Into Your Arms =

1993 single by the Lemonheads

Single by the Lemonheads

from the album Come on Feel the Lemonheads
- Released: October 4, 1993
- Genre: Alternative rock; jangle pop
- Length: 2:47
- Label: Atlantic
- Songwriter: Robyn St. Clare
- Producer: The Robb Brothers

The Lemonheads singles chronology
"Confetti" (1993)	"Into Your Arms" (1993)	"It's About Time" (1994)

"Into Your Arms" is a song by Australian duo Love Positions, consisting of Robyn St. Clare (who wrote the song) and Nic Dalton, released in 1989. In 1992, Dalton joined American alternative rock band the Lemonheads, who covered the song on their sixth studio album, Come on Feel the Lemonheads (1993). The song was released as the album's lead single in October 1993 by Atlantic Records.

"Into Your Arms" reached number one on the US Billboard Modern Rock Tracks chart, remaining atop the chart for nine straight weeks, a record at the time that they shared with U2. The song also reached numbers 67 and 75 on the Billboard Hot 100 and Cash Box Top 100 charts, and charted in Australia, Canada, and the United Kingdom; in the latter country, it was a top-20 hit.

== Track listings ==
- US cassette single
1. "Into Your Arms" (LP version)
2. "Miss Otis Regrets"
- US, UK, and Australian CD single; UK 10-inch EP
1. "Into Your Arms" – 2:45
2. "Miss Otis Regrets" – 2:40
3. "Little Black Egg" – 2:15
4. "Learning the Game" – 1:18
- European maxi-CD single
1. "Into Your Arms"
2. "Miss Otis Regrets"
3. "Learning the Game"
- UK 7-inch and cassette single
1. "Into Your Arms" – 2:45
2. "Miss Otis Regrets" – 2:40

== Charts ==
Chart (1993–1994)	Peak position
Australia (ARIA)	46
Canada Top Singles (RPM)	84
Europe (Eurochart Hot 100)	61
UK Singles (Official Charts)	14
UK Airplay (Music Week)	16
US Billboard Hot 100	67
US Modern Rock Tracks (Billboard)	1
US Cash Box Top 100	75

== Release history ==
Region	Date	Format(s)	Label(s)	Ref.
United Kingdom	October 4, 1993	7-inch vinyl; 10-inch vinyl; CD; cassette	Atlantic	
Australia	November 22, 1993	CD; cassette	Atlantic	

== See also ==
- List of Billboard number-one alternative singles of the 1990s
