= Tom Morgan (musician) =

Australian musician and songwriter (born 1970)

- Born: Thomas Martin Morgan; 3 March 1970 (age 56); Maitland, New South Wales, Australia
- Genres: Indie pop, power pop, psychedelic pop
- Occupations: Musician, songwriter
- Instruments: Guitar, vocals, bass guitar
- Years active: 1991–present
- Labels: Fire, Half A Cow

Thomas Martin Morgan (born 3 March 1970) is an Australian musician and songwriter. He fronts the 1990s indie pop group, Smudge (1991–present). He has written or co-written (with Evan Dando) songs for Boston power pop group, the Lemonheads. Morgan's other bands include Sneeze (1991–present), The Givegoods, Godstar (1991–95), Tofu Kok and Bambino Koresh (ca. 2012). He married Argentine-Spanish musician, Leticia Nischang (Sneeze, Bambino Koresh). As of September 2010, Morgan and Nischang were living in Maitland.

On 4 March 2013 Morgan issued his solo album, Orange Syringe, with Nischang providing backing vocals.

== Discography ==
- Orange Syringe (4 March 2013) Fire Records (FIRECD292, FV292LP)
- Local Knowledge (2001) Lake Midgeon (LMD001)
