= Josh Lattanzi =

American musician

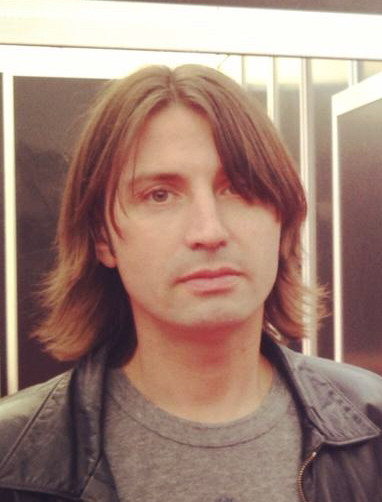
- Lattanzi in 2013

Background information
- Born: New Haven, Connecticut, U.S.
- Genres: Rock, folk rock, indie rock, alternative rock, blues
- Occupation: Musician
- Instruments: Guitar, bass guitar, piano, vocals
- Years active: 1998–present
- Label: The End

Josh Lattanzi is an American musician best known for his collaborations with Norah Jones, Ben Kweller, The Lemonheads, Albert Hammond Jr., and The Candles.

== Early life ==
Lattanzi graduated from Berklee College of Music in 1994.

== Early Collaborations ==
Lattanzi recorded and toured with Juliana Hatfield 1998–2002. He recorded background vocals on James Taylor's 2003 release, October Road. He joined Ivy as their touring guitar player during tours from 2002–2004.

== 2001–2005: Ben Kweller ==
After Radish broke up, Lattanzi joined Ben Kweller's band on bass. He collaborated with Kweller on the Sha Sha (2002) and On My Way (2004) albums.

== 2003–Present: The Lemonheads ==
While on tour with Juliana Hatfield, Lattanzi met Evan Dando of The Lemonheads and toured in support of his solo album Baby I'm Bored. Years later, Lattanzi would go on to support the band, playing bass on the 2006 release The Lemonheads. Lattanzi has performed off and on with the band since 2005.

== 2005–2008: Albert Hammond, Jr. ==
Lattanzi recorded on Albert Hammond Jr.'s 2006 and 2008 solo records, Yours to Keep and ¿Cómo Te Llama?, and toured extensively with Hammond's band.

== 2008–Present: The Candles ==
Lattanzi formed The Candles in 2008. The band has been described as a fusion of 70s rock and 90s alternative music. Lattanzi's debut album, Between the Sounds, received critical acclaim in Rolling Stone, Spin, and NME magazines, and the band has performed with Norah Jones and Jon Fishman, among others. The band supported Fountains of Wayne and The Lemonheads on tour in 2010 and has since appeared at such notable festivals as South by Southwest.

== 2009: Tinted Windows ==
Lattanzi joined Tinted Windows as their touring guitar player in 2009.

== 2012–Present: Norah Jones ==
Lattanzi started performing with Norah Jones in support of her 2012 release Little Broken Hearts. He plays electric bass, upright bass and guitar in the band. He was a member of her touring band in 2016 and 2017 in support of her album Daybreaks. He also toured in support of her album 2019 release, Begin Again. He appears on her 2020 release Pick Me Up Off The Floor.

== Discography ==
- EP Phone Home (Ben Kweller: 2001, BMG International)
- Sha Sha (Ben Kweller: 2002, ATO)
- October Road (James Taylor: 2002, Sony)
- Gold Stars 1992-2002: The Juliana Hatfield Collection (Juliana Hatfield: 2002, Zoe Records)
- Australia (Howie Day: 2002, Epic Records)
- The Art of Losing (American Hi-Fi: 2003, Island)
- On My Way (Ben Kweller: 2004, ATO)
- In Exile Deo (Juliana Hatfield: 2004, Zoe Records)
- The Lemonheads (The Lemonheads: 2006, Vagrant)
- Yours to Keep (Albert Hammond Jr.: 2006, Rough Trade Records)
- ¿Cómo Te Llama? (Albert Hammond Jr.: 2008, Rough Trade Records)
- Sound the Alarm (Howie Day: 2009, Epic)
- Changing Horses (Ben Kweller: 2009, ATO)
- Between the Sounds (The Candles: 2010, The End Records)
- Look to the Sky (James Iha: 2012, The End Records)
- Little Broken Hearts (deluxe edition) (Norah Jones: 2012, Blue Note Records)
- iTunes Festival: London 2012 – EP (Norah Jones: 2012, Blue Note Records)
- La Candelaria (The Candles: 2013, The End Records)
