= Jason Roberts (guitarist) =

American musical artist

Jason A Roberts
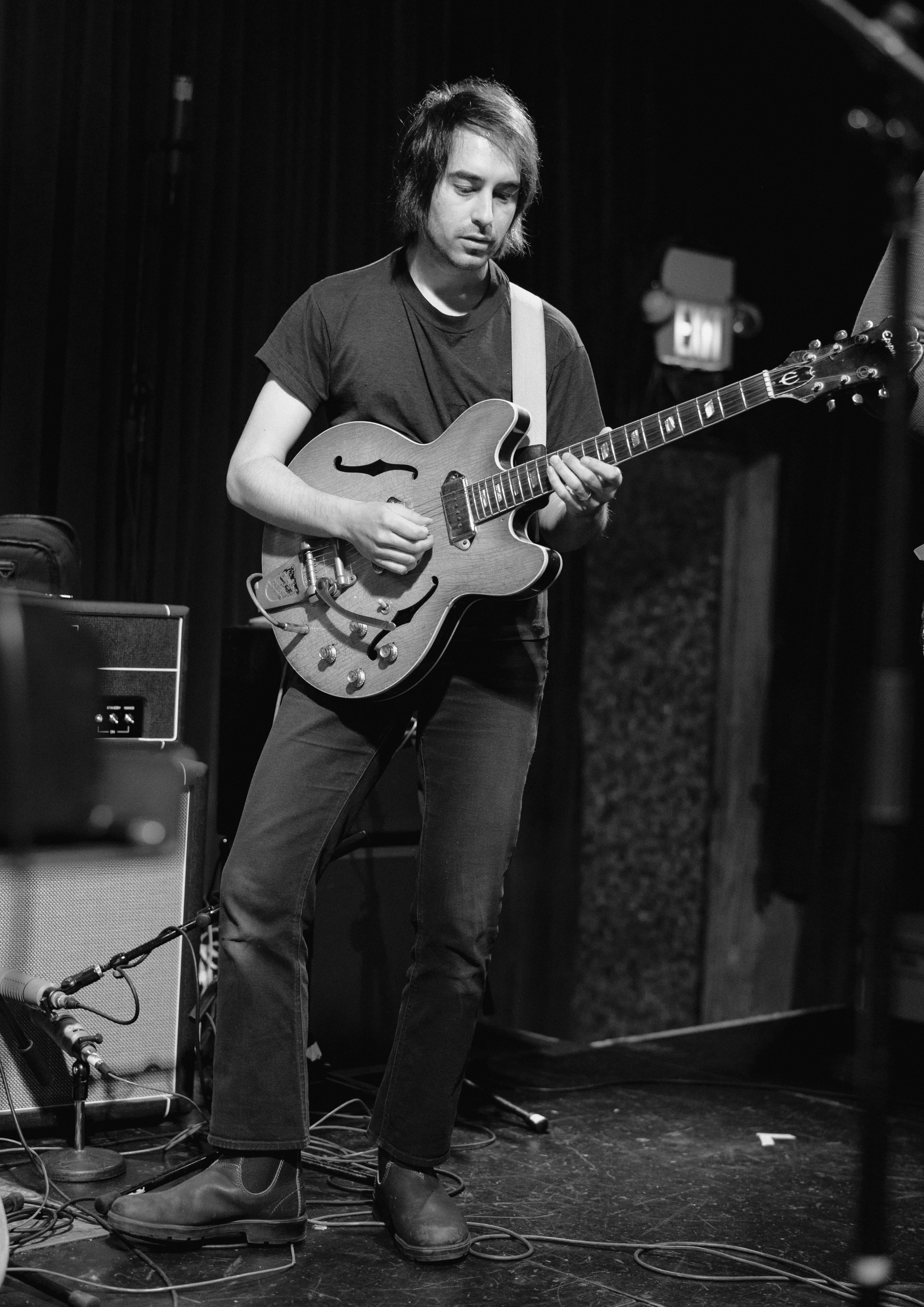

Background information
- Born: Jason Abraham Roberts
- Genres: rock; folk; indie; country; psychedelic
- Occupations: guitarist; musician (multi-instrumentalist); producer; songwriter; session musician
- Instruments: guitar; bass guitar; piano; vocals
- Years active: 2004–present

Jason A Roberts is the professional name of American musician and producer Jason Roberts. Roberts is best known for his collaborations with Bedouine, Norah Jones, Hymns, Ben Kweller, and The Candles.

== Musical career ==
=== 2004–2007: Ben Kweller ===
Roberts met Ben Kweller at The Living Room shortly after relocating to New York City.

Kweller was about to embark on the On My Way world-tour and on the hunt for a new guitarist; Roberts quickly filled this role to play guitar and piano at 92 concerts. Roberts toured again with Kweller in 2006 in support of the album: Ben Kweller.

=== 2006–2010: Hymns ===
In fall 2006, Roberts formed the band: Hymns with Brian Harding, Matt Shaw, and Tony Kent.

The band would later release the record Brother/Sister, which was critically acclaimed by Spin Magazine and MTV News. Afterwards, the band toured with Ben Kweller, The Lemonheads, Butch Walker, and Daniel Johnston. Later, Roberts and the Hymns released the albums: Travel in Herds (2008) and Appaloosa (2009).

Roberts and other members of Hymns were also Daniel Johnston's backing band for several tours, including an appearance at the Hollywood Bowl (2014).

=== 2010–2017: The Candles ===
Roberts was a member of The Candles.

The band had toured several times with The Lemonheads, acted as Evan Dando's backing band, and opened for Norah Jones on her Daybreaks World Tour.

=== 2012–2017: Norah Jones ===
Roberts was the lead guitarist in the Norah Jones band.

He toured extensively with her during the 2012–2013: Little Broken Hearts Tour and the 2016–2017: Daybreaks World Tour. Roberts has appeared live with Jones on television and radio programs including Late Night with Jimmy Fallon, Later... with Jools Holland, Austin City Limits, and the Late Show with David Letterman.

=== 2017–2022: Bedouine ===
Roberts is the lead guitarist in Bedouine's band.

=== Other Notable Appearances ===
==== Musical Performances ====
- Aug. 2012: Roberts performed with Bob Weir at the Outside Lands Music and Arts Festival.
- Aug. 2012: Roberts performed with Phil Lesh (Grateful Dead), Bob Weir (Grateful Dead), and Mike Gordon (Phish) at Jerry Garcia's 70th birthday party.
  - The Move Me Brightly event was held at TRI Studios.
- Jan. 2013: Roberts performed with Jon Fishman (Phish) at the 'Long May You Run' Benefit Concert in Washington DC.
- Oct. 2016: Roberts performed with Neil Young at The Bridge School Benefit in Mountain View, CA
- Between Feb. and April 2018: Roberts toured with Jonathan Wilson in the US and Europe.

== Selected discography ==
Year	Artist Name	Release Details
2002	The Port Huron Statement	Album: Tory; Genre: Indie Rock; Roberts credits: Piano
2006	Domino	Album: Everyone Else Is Boring; Genre: Pop rock; Roberts credits: Guitar
2006	Hymns	Album: Brother / Sister; Genre: Country rock; Roberts credits: Producer, Guitar, Bass Guitar, Piano, Percussion
2007	Sputnik	Album: Shine On...; Genre: Indie Rock; Roberts credits: Guitar
2007	Hymns	Album: Travel in Herds; Genre: Indie Rock; Roberts credits: Producer, Guitar, Piano, Percussion, Background Vocals
2010	Hymns	Album: Appaloosa EP; Genre: Indie Rock; Roberts credits: Producer, Guitar, Piano, Percussion, Background Vocals
2010	Anthony D'Amato	Album: Down Wires; Genre: Folk rock; Roberts credits: Guitar
2012	Pretty Good Dance Moves	Album: Limo; Genre: Pop rock; Roberts credits: Guitar, Bass Guitar
2012	Phenomenal Handclap Band & Peaches	Album: Walk The Night; Genre: Psychedelic soul; Roberts credits: Guitar, Bass Guitar
2013	The Candles	Album: La Candelaria; Genre: Folk rock; Roberts credits: Producer, Guitar, Bass Guitar, Percussion, Background Vocals
2013	Bing Ji Ling	Album: Por Cada Nube; Genre: Rhythm and blues; Roberts credits: Guitar
2014	Beck	Album: Song Reader; Genre: Alternative rock; Roberts credits: Guitar – with Norah Jones
2014	Lucy Arnell	Album: Side By Side EP; Genre: Folk rock, Psychedelic rock; Roberts credits: Producer, Mixer, Guitar, Percussion, songwriter
2014	Ex Cops	Album: Daggers; Genre: Pop rock; Roberts credits: Guitar, songwriter
2015	Alberta Cross	Album: Alberta Cross; Genre: Rock; Roberts credits: Guitar, Engineer
2015	Lucy Arnell	Album: The Sky Turned Red With The Rainbow; Genre: Folk rock, Psychedelic rock; Roberts credits: Producer, Mixer, Guitar, Bass Guitar, Organ, Percussion, Background Vocals, songwriter
2016	Norah Jones	Album: Norah Jones: Day Breaks (Target Exclusive); Genre: Jazz; Roberts credits: Guitar
2016	The Candles	Album: Matter + Spirit; Genre: Folk rock; Roberts credits: Guitar, Engineer
2016	George Fest	Album: A Night To Celebrate the Music of George Harrison; Genre: Folk rock; Roberts credits: Guitar – with Norah Jones
2016	Jenny O.	Album: Work EP; Genre: Indie Rock; Roberts credits: Guitar
2017	Blond Ambition	Album: Slow All Over; Genre: Pop rock; Roberts credits: Guitar, Bass Guitar
2018	Steady Holiday	Album: Nobody's Watching; Genre: Indie Rock; Roberts credits: Guitar
2025	The Last Gray Wolf	Single: Kentucky Telephone; Genre: Folk rock, Indie Rock; Roberts credits: Producer, Guitar
