= How Ya Lookin' Southbound? Come In... =

EP by Ben Kweller
- Released: 2008
- Genre: Indie rock
- Label: ATO Records / Noise Co.

Ben Kweller chronology
Ben Kweller (2006)	How Ya Lookin' Southbound? Come In... (2008)	Changing Horses (2009)

How Ya Lookin' Southbound? Come In... is a limited edition tour EP by American singer-songwriter Ben Kweller. It was released in 2008 to promote the Pre-Horses Club Tour which began September 25 in Dallas, Texas. The EP contains 3 songs from the 2009 album, Changing Horses, as well as unreleased demos and material taken from Ben's personal recordings.

== Track listing ==
1. "Fight"
2. "Things I Like to Do"
3. "Sawdust Baby"
4. "Sawdust Man"
5. "The Biggest Flower"
6. "F Train Blues / Gypsy Rosita"
7. "Somehow (Singlemalt Version)"
