= John David Kent =

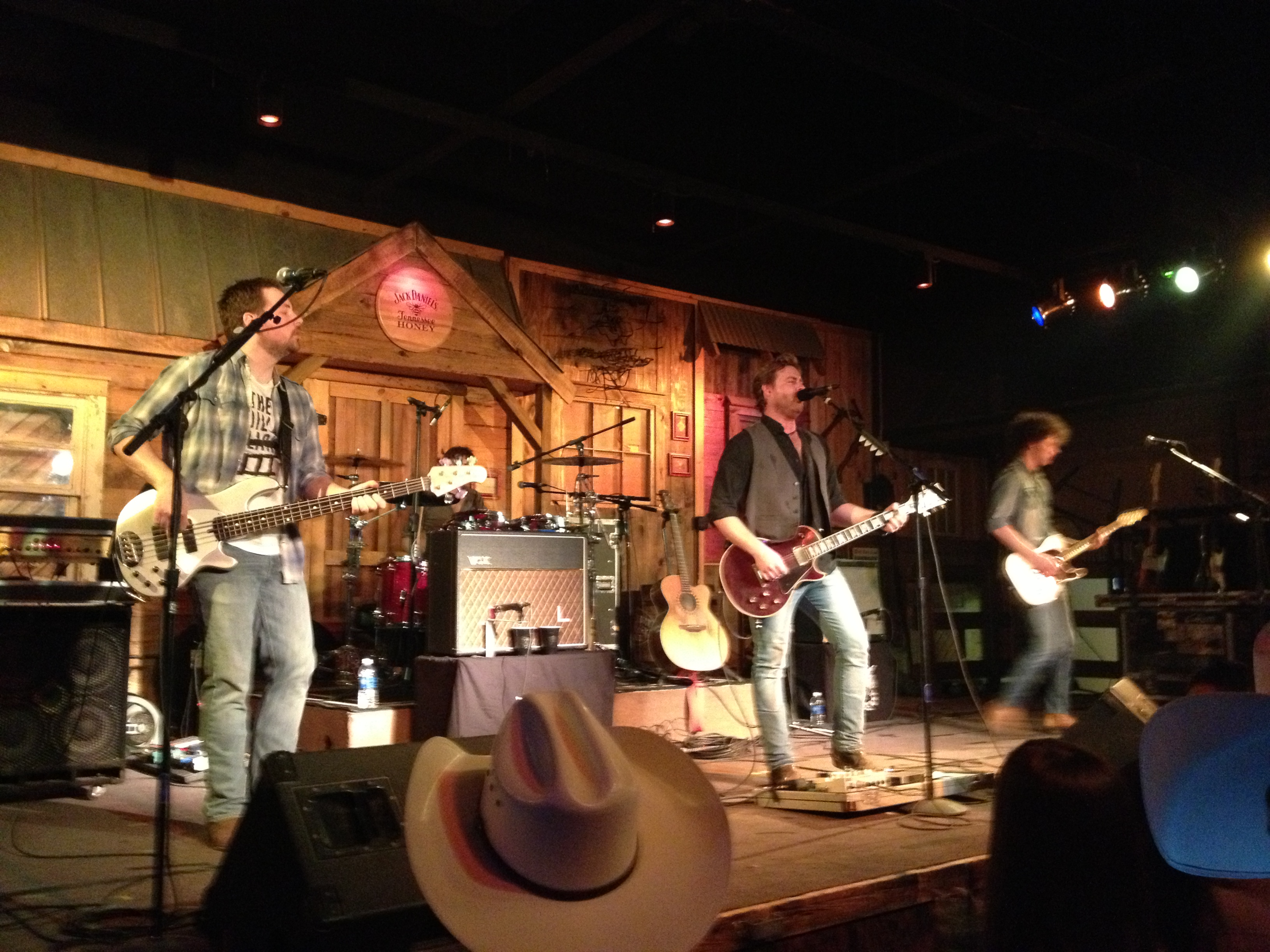
- John David Kent performs at Big Texas Dance Hall on Friday, May 3, 2013, in Spring, TX.

Background information
- Origin: Celeste, Texas, Texas, United States
- Genres: Country, Texas Country, Americana
- Years active: 2008–present
- Members: John David Kent (Vocals, Guitar), Randall Fuller (Bass guitar, Harmony Vocals); Tony Kent (Drums, Harmony Vocals); Colton Gilbreath (Lead Guitar, Harmony Vocals, Lead Fro)
- Website: http://www.johndavidkent.com

John David Kent is a country band based out of Celeste, TX. Consisting of John David Kent, also known as John Kent, formerly of the late 1990s post-grunge band Radish, and other North Texas natives Randall Fuller, Tony Kent, and Colton Gilbreath.

== Background information ==
After John's stint recording and touring with Radish, Ben Kweller, and The Lemonheads, he relocated back to his hometown of Celeste, TX to form Blackland Records and open "The Vault" Recording Studio. John began to write songs of his own and formed the band Pony League which is now defunct but then put together John David Kent. The band's self-titled first album, released on May 17, 2011, is available on iTunes. Their second album was released in 2013.

== Discography ==
- John David Kent (2009, Blackland Records)
- Before The Sun Comes Up (2013, Roustabout Records/Blackland Records)
