= Sundress (disambiguation) =

A sundress is a casual woman's dress found in Western cultures in the 20th and 21st centuries.

Sundress may also refer to:

- Sundress, a 2006 EP by Ben Kwellen, containing the song "Sundress"
- "Sundress", a 2018 song by ASAP Rocky
- "Sundress", a 2018 song by DRAM on the EP That's a Girls Name
- "Sundress", a 1992 song by the band Hum on the album Electra 2000

== See also ==
- The Sun's Dress, a 2014 Emirati film
