= Christopher Mintz-Plasse =

American actor (born 1989)

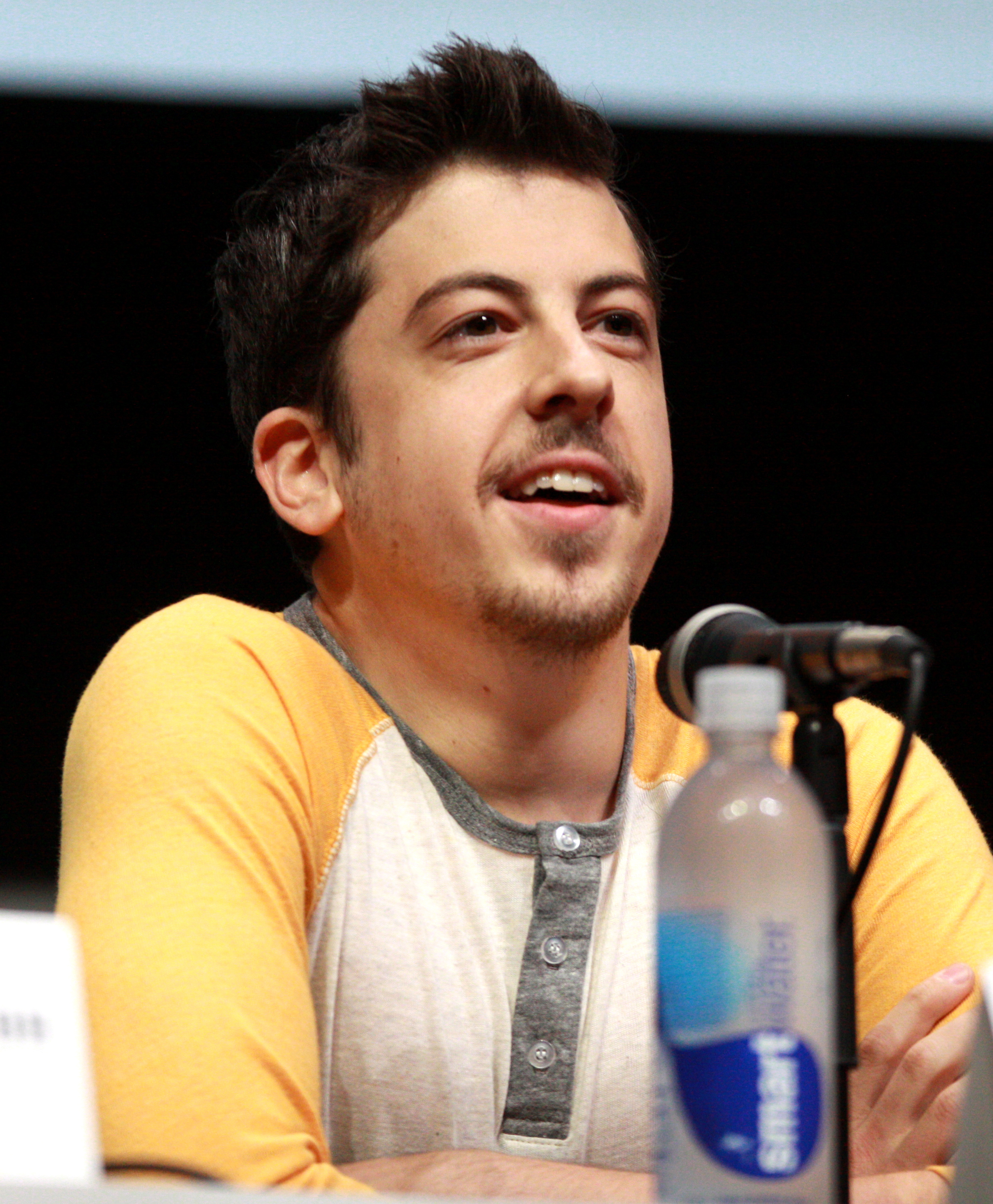
- Mintz-Plasse in 2013
- Born: Christopher Charles Mintz-Plasse; June 20, 1989 (age 37); Los Angeles, California, U.S.
- Education: El Camino Real Charter High School; University of California, Riverside
- Occupations: Actor; musician
- Years active: 2006–present

Christopher Charles Mintz-Plasse (/mɪnts ˈplɑːs/; born June 20, 1989) is an American actor and musician, primarily known for his debut role as Fogell / McLovin in the movie Superbad (2007) and for portraying Chris D'Amico/Red Mist in the Kick-Ass franchise.

== Early life ==
Christopher Charles Mintz-Plasse was born in Woodland Hills, Los Angeles, where he attended El Camino Real High School, performing on its improv comedy team. He is the son of Ellen Mintz, a school counselor, and Ray Plasse, a postal worker. He is Jewish on his mother's side, whereas his father is from a Catholic family. His father was born in Worcester, Massachusetts and raised in Webster, Massachusetts. Mintz-Plasse is a lifelong Boston sports fan.

== Career ==
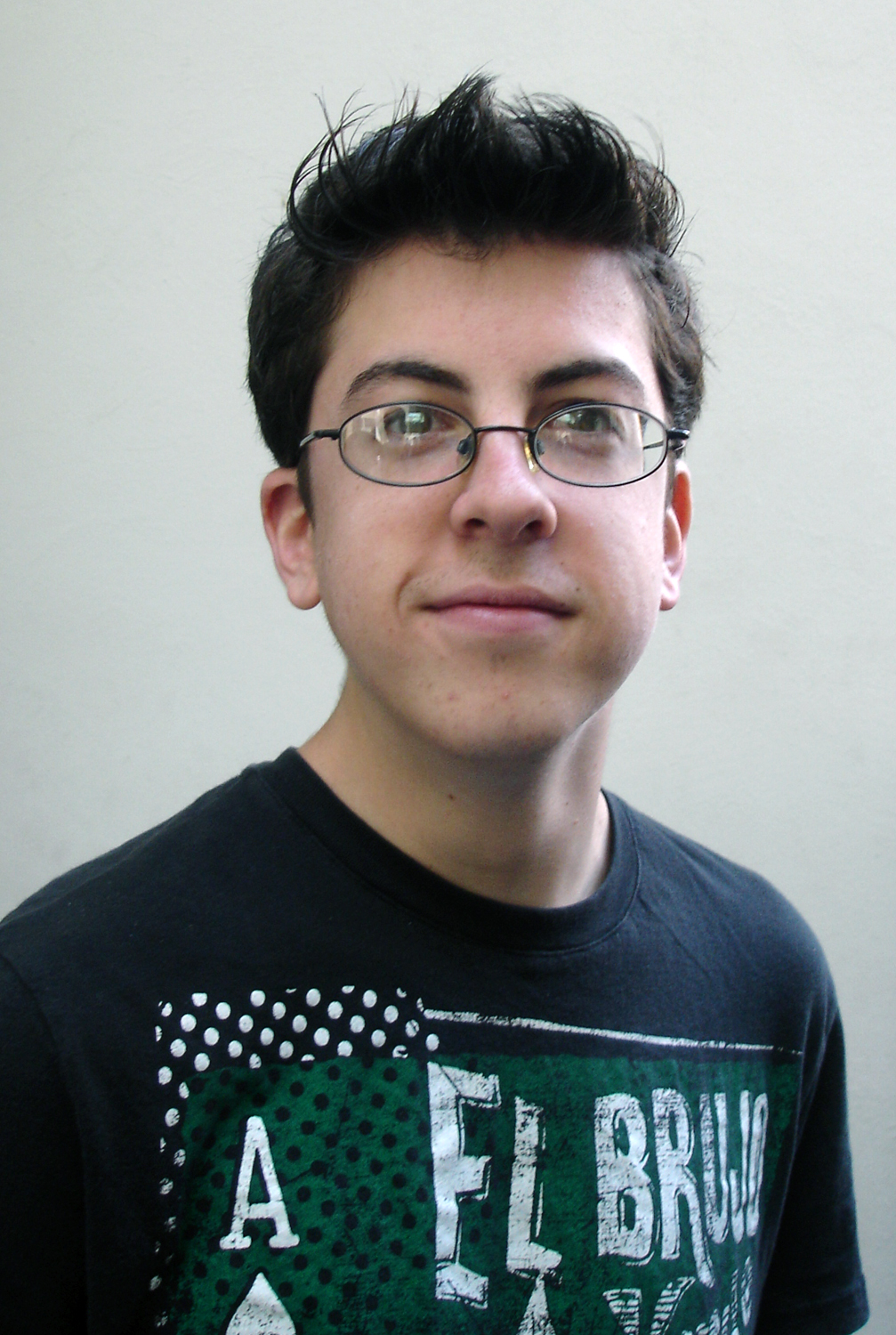
Mintz-Plasse in 2007

When auditioning for the part of Fogell in his film debut Superbad, he had no professional headshots and instead took one with his camera phone. Because he was 17 at the time and still a minor, his mother was required by law to be on set while he filmed his sex scene in the movie. Upon release, the film earned critical and commercial success, with many critics citing Mintz-Plasse's performance as a highlight; he received a nomination for the MTV Movie Award for Best Breakthrough Performance.

In 2008, Mintz-Plasse next appeared with Paul Rudd and Seann William Scott in David Wain's film Role Models as Augie Farques, a nerdy teenager obsessed with medieval live-action role-playing games. He also made a small guest appearance on an episode of David Wain's internet series, Wainy Days. He then starred in Harold Ramis's film Year One, as a comedic version of the biblical figure Isaac. He also appeared in a short film The Tale of RJ which became the basis for the television series The Hard Times of RJ Berger.

The next year, he voiced Fishlegs in the animated film How to Train Your Dragon. In April 2010, he appeared in Kick-Ass as the superhero Red Mist, a.k.a. Chris D'Amico, which was planned to be a minor role until director Matthew Vaughn saw Mintz-Plasse audition and his capabilities. Mintz-Plasse originally auditioned for the role of Kick-Ass, but when the producers believed that his acting was too loud and obnoxious, they granted him the role of Red Mist instead.

In May 2010, he guest-starred in an episode of Party Down as Kent, a friend of the character Roman. He performed his second voice-over that month in the film Marmaduke, as the stylized dog Giuseppe. The same year he was featured in two music videos, Kid Cudi's "Erase Me", featuring Kanye West, and the indie rock band The Soft Pack's "Answer to Yourself".

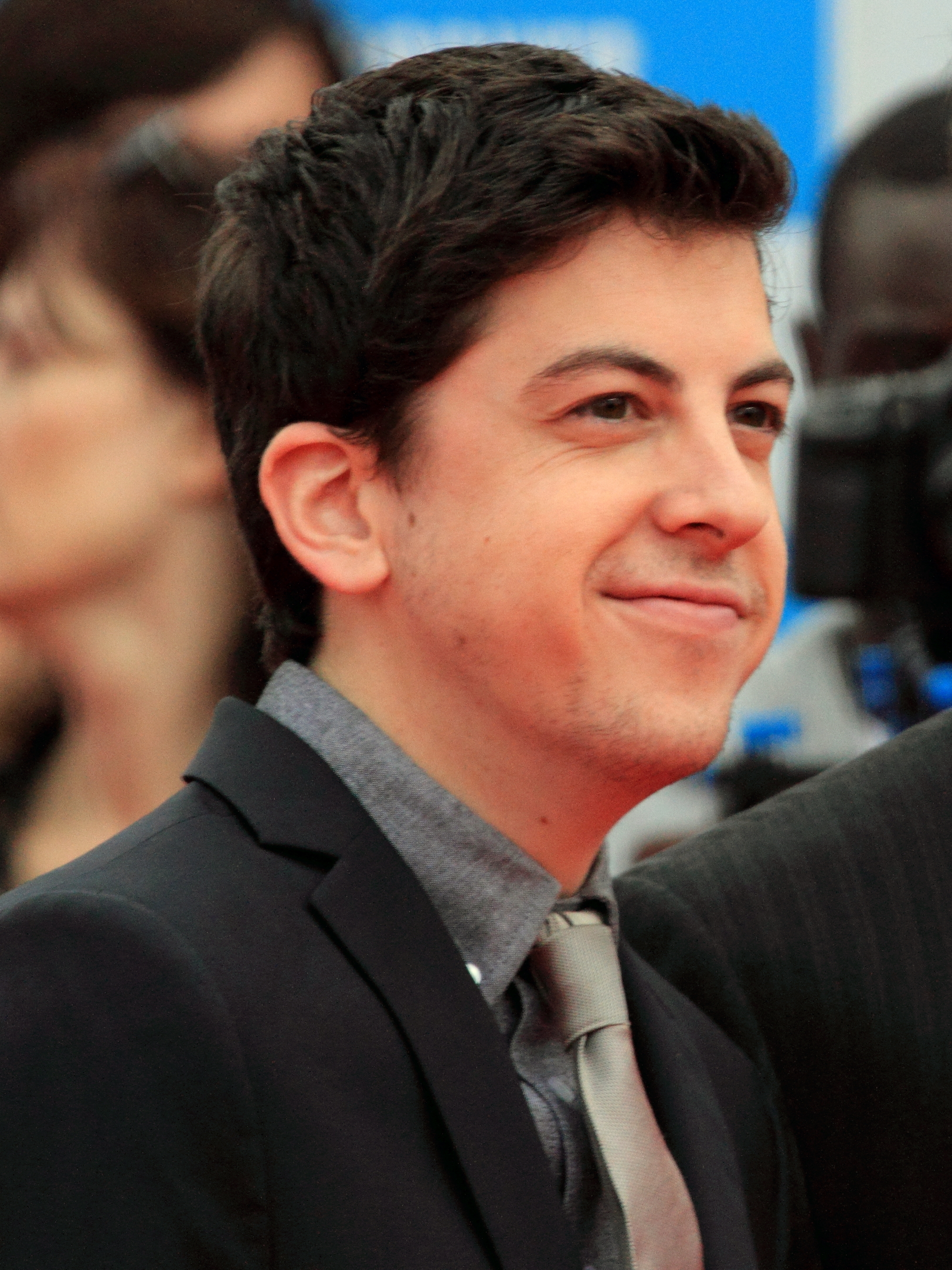
Mintz-Plasse at a screening of Fright Night at the Deauville American Film Festival in 2011

In 2011, Mintz-Plasse appeared in Fright Night—a remake of the 1985 film—as Edward Lee, former best friend of Charley Brewster, played by Anton Yelchin. At first he was reluctant to accept the role as it was a remake, but he accepted after reading the script and seeing the talent involved.

In 2012, he voiced the bullying student Alvin in the animated film, ParaNorman. The same year he also had a small role in the film Pitch Perfect as Tommy, the university's audition launcher. He then starred in a short film, Would You, written by his Fright Night co-star Dave Franco and premiered at the SXSW Film Festival. Mintz-Plasse was supposed to play the lead role in the CBS sitcom Friend Me and even filmed several episodes, but before the series could air, it was cancelled after series creator Alan Kirschenbaum died by suicide. As a promotion for the video game Far Cry 3, he starred in The Far Cry Experience, a series of online videos, as a fictional version of himself trapped on an island controlled by a psychopathic pirate named Vaas.

He reprised his role of Chris D'Amico in the sequel Kick-Ass 2, which was released in August 2013. Mintz-Plasse found the role to be darker than any other he had portrayed to date, and hired an acting coach to help him with the more intense scenes. He made his third music video appearance in the Unknown Mortal Orchestra's music video "So Good at Being in Trouble".

He and his Kick-Ass co-star Chloë Grace Moretz starred in a short segment, "Middle School Date", in the film Movie 43. He also had small roles in Seth Rogen and Evan Goldberg's This Is the End, playing a fictional version of himself, and in the romantic comedy film The To Do List, with Aubrey Plaza.

Mintz-Plasse appeared in the 2013 comedy skit investigating the voice behind the "Trap-a-Holics" adlib on WorldStarHipHop. In September that year, he and Dave Franco set out on a week-long road trip across America to promote the technology company LG's "It's All Possible" campaign for its flagship smartphone, the LG G2. The actors documented their process and broadcast it on Funny or Die. Mintz-Plasse had a supporting role as college fraternity student Scoonie in the 2014 hit comedy film Neighbors. He also reprised his role as Fishlegs in the animated sequel How to Train Your Dragon 2 and in the DreamWorks Dragons television series, which aired on Cartoon Network and Netflix.

Mintz-Plasse played drums for the rock band The Young Rapscallions, which split after eight years in 2015. He then founded the band Bear on Fire, in which he plays bass guitar.

Mintz-Plasse began playing bass guitar with Ben Kweller during the 2021 Circuit Boredom tour. In 2025, he rejoined Kweller's band to support the grief-saturated album Cover the Mirrors, which was dedicated to Kweller's late son. The live performances, including shows at Salt Lake City's Urban Lounge and Vancouver's Biltmore Cabaret, were described as intimate and cathartic celebrations of life and loss.

== Filmography ==
=== Film ===
Year	Title	Role	Notes
2007	Superbad	Fogell / McLovin	
2008	Role Models	Augie	
2009	Year One	Isaac	
2009	The Tale of RJ	RJ	Short film
2010	Kick-Ass	Chris D'Amico/Red Mist	
2010	How to Train Your Dragon	Fishlegs Ingerman	Voice
2010	Marmaduke	Giuseppe	Voice
2010	Legend of the Boneknapper Dragon	Fishlegs Ingerman	Voice, short film
2011	Fright Night	Edward "Evil Ed” Lee	
2011	Gift of the Night Fury	Fishlegs Ingerman	Voice, short film
2011	Book of Dragons	Fishlegs Ingerman	Voice, short film
2012	ParaNorman	Alvin	Voice
2012	Would You	Himself	Short film
2012	Pitch Perfect	Tommy	
2013	Movie 43	Mikey	Segment: "Middleschool Date"
2013	This Is the End	Himself	
2013	The To Do List	Duffy	
2013	Kick-Ass 2	Chris D'Amico/The Motherfucker	
2014	Neighbors	Scoonie Schofield	
2014	How to Train Your Dragon 2	Fishlegs Ingerman	Voice
2014	Dawn of the Dragon Racers	Fishlegs Ingerman	Voice, short film
2015	Tag	Jacob	
2016	Get a Job	Ethan	
2016	Neighbors 2: Sorority Rising	Scoonie Schofield	
2016	Trolls	King Gristle Jr.	Voice
2017	The Disaster Artist	Sid	Scene deleted
2019	How to Train Your Dragon: The Hidden World	Fishlegs Ingerman	Voice
2020	Promising Young Woman	Neil	
2020	Trolls World Tour	King Gristle Jr.	Voice cameo
2022	Honor Society	Mr. Calvin	
2023	Trolls Band Together	King Gristle Jr.	Voice
TBA	Sticks and Stones		Filming

=== Television ===
Year	Title	Role	Notes
2007	Wainy Days	Sketchy laborer #2	Episode: "Tough Guy"
2010	Party Down	Kent	Episode: "Steve Guttenberg's Birthday"
2012	Friend Me	Evan	Unaired series
2012	The Far Cry Experience	Himself	Shorts
2012–2018	DreamWorks Dragons	Fishlegs Ingerman	Voice, 102 episodes
2015	Sharing	Grant	Pilot
2016	Sanjay and Craig	Randy Noodman	Voice, episode: "Dude Snake Nood"
2016	Flaked	Topher	3 episodes
2016–2017	The Great Indoors	Clark	22 episodes
2017	Trolls Holiday	King Gristle	Voice, television special
2018	The Joel McHale Show with Joel McHale	Various roles	3 episodes
2018	Stan Against Evil	Zach	Episode: "Vampire Creek"
2018–2021	Blark and Son	Son	Voice, 32 episodes
2019	How to Train Your Dragon: Homecoming	Fishlegs Ingerman	Voice, television special
2020	Home Movie: The Princess Bride	Westley	Episode: "Chapter Seven: The Pit of Despair"
2021	When Nature Calls with Helen Mirren	Various roles	Voices, 3 episodes
2023	Stars on Mars	Himself	1 episode
2024–2025	Tales of the Teenage Mutant Ninja Turtles	Pigeon Pete	Voice, Recurring role
2026	Backyard Sports: The Animated Special	Dmitri Petrovich	Voice, animated special
2026	The Boys	Himself (uncredited)	Episode: "One-Shots"
2026	The Lowdown	Pookie	Season Two, Episode Two

=== Music videos ===
Year	Song	Artist	Notes
2010	"Erase Me"	Kid Cudi	featuring Kanye West
2010	"Answer to Yourself"	The Soft Pack	
2013	"So Good At Being In Trouble"	Unknown Mortal Orchestra	
2015	"U Don't Know"	Alison Wonderland	featuring Wayne Coyne
2015	"Ready"	Kodaline	
2020	"CVS"	Winnetka Bowling League	featuring Hilary Duff
2026	"C.E.O."	Weezer	

== Awards and nominations ==
Year	Association	Category	Nominated work	Result
2008	MTV Movie Award	Best Breakthrough Performance	Superbad	Nominated
2008	Young Artist Awards	Best Performance in a Feature Film – Supporting Young Actor	Superbad	Nominated
2010	Teen Choice Awards	Choice Movie Villain	Kick-Ass	Nominated
2010	Scream Awards	Best Supporting Actor	Kick-Ass	Nominated
2014	Golden Raspberry Awards	Worst Screen Combo (with the entire cast)	Movie 43	Nominated
2014	Young Hollywood Awards	Best Cast Chemistry (with the entire cast)	Neighbors	Nominated
2014	Young Hollywood Awards	Best Threesome (with Zac Efron and Dave Franco)	Neighbors	Nominated
2014	Teen Choice Awards	Choice Movie Fight (shared with Aaron Taylor-Johnson)	Kick-Ass 2	Nominated
