= Sundress (EP) =

EP by Ben Kweller
- Released: August 29, 2006
- Genre: Indie rock
- Label: ATO Records

Ben Kweller chronology
On My Way (2004)	Sundress (2006)	Ben Kweller (2006)

Sundress EP is an EP from the American singer-songwriter Ben Kweller. It was released August 28, 2006. The song "Sundress" from the EP has been featured in Friends with Benefits (2011) and The Marvelous Mrs. Maisel (2018).

== Track listing ==
1. "Sundress"
2. "Never Let You Fall"
3. "Magic"
4. "Sorry Signs on Cash Machines" (Mason Jennings Cover)
5. "Sundress (Acoustic)"
