= Go Fly a Kite =

Studio album by Ben Kweller
- Released: February 7, 2012
- Genres: Power pop, alt-country, folk rock
- Label: Noise Co.

Ben Kweller chronology
Changing Horses (2009)	Go Fly a Kite (2012)	Circuit Boredom (2021)

Professional ratings
Aggregate scores
Source	Rating
Metacritic	71/100
Review scores
Source	Rating
AllMusic	3.5/5 stars
Blurt	4/5 stars
Paste	8.5/10

Go Fly a Kite is the fifth studio album by American singer-songwriter Ben Kweller, which was released on February 7, 2012. This is his first album since splitting with former label ATO Records.

== Reception ==
The AllMusic review called it "a refreshing album on a number of levels" because of Kweller's inclusion of "the detailed notes on how to play each song along with the lyrics...keeping nothing, not even the chord progressions, secret."

== Track listing ==
No.	Title	Length
1.	"Mean to Me"	3:20
2.	"Out the Door"	3:42
3.	"Jealous Girl"	3:56
4.	"Gossip"	3:48
5.	"Free" (made free on the iTunes Store for the week of February 12, 2012)	3:41
6.	"Full Circle"	3:09
7.	"Justify Me"	2:19
8.	"The Rainbow"	3:57
9.	"Time Will Save the Day"	3:47
10.	"I Miss You"	3:58
11.	"You Can Count On Me"	3:22

== Personnel ==
=== Musicians ===
- Ben Kweller – vocals, guitar, 12-string guitar, piano, organ, synthesizer, percussion
- Mark Stepro – drums, percussion, vocals
- Chris Morrissey – bass guitar
- Ben Kitterman – accordion, dobro, organ
- Brian Standefer – cello
- Joel Green – alto saxophone
- Jonathon Lachance – alto saxophone
- Matt the Electrician – trumpet

== Production ==
- Candice Digby - Production Coordination
- Emdash - Art Conception, Design
- Howie Weinberg - Mastering
- John Biondolillo - Licensing
- John P. Strohm - Legal Counsel
- Josh Cochran - Illustrations
- Ken Weinstein - Publicity
- Kiko Velez - A&R
- Liz Kweller - Art Direction
- Pete Lyman - Mastering
- Steve Mazur - Engineer, Mixing

== Charts ==
Chart performance for Go Fly a Kite
Chart (2012)	Peak position
US Billboard 200	124
