= Mean to Me =

Mean to Me can refer to:

- "Mean to Me" (1929 song), with music by Fred E. Ahlert and lyrics by Roy Turk
- "Mean to Me" (Crowded House song), a 1986 song by Crowded House, from their self-titled debut album
- "Mean to Me" (Brett Eldredge song), a 2014 song by Brett Eldredge, from his album Bring You Back
- "Mean to Me" (The Stranglers song), on the 1978 album Black and White
- "Mean to Me", a 1999 song by Tonic from Sugar
- "Mean to Me", a 2012 song by Ben Kweller, from his album Go Fly a Kite
