= Wild Child (band) =

American indie pop band

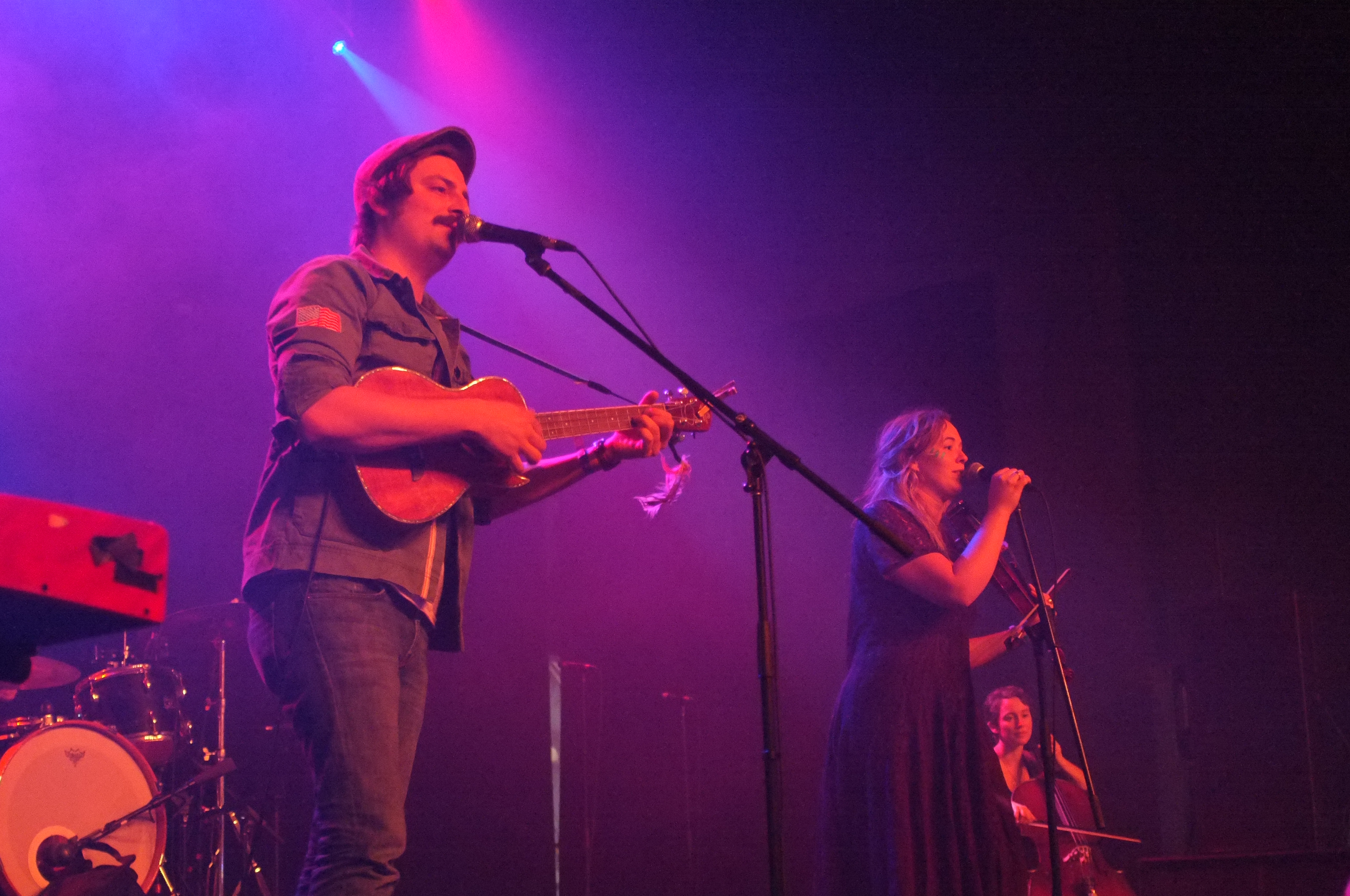
- Wild Child: Alexander Beggins, Kelsey Wilson, Sadie Wolfe perform at Emo's Austin

Background information
- Origin: Austin, Texas, U.S.
- Genre: Indie pop
- Years active: 2010–present
- Labels: Dualtone; The Noise Company; Dine Alone
- Members: Kelsey Wilson; Alexander Beggins; Sadie Wolfe; Matt Bradshaw; Tom Myers
- Website: wildchildsounds.com

Wild Child is an American indie pop band from Austin, Texas formed in 2010. The band consists of Kelsey Wilson (lead vocals and violin), Alexander Beggins (lead vocals and baritone ukulele), Sadie Wolfe (cello), Tyler Osmond (bass), Matt Bradshaw (keyboard and trumpet), Cody Ackors (guitar and trombone), and Tom Myers (drums).

== History ==
=== Beginnings (2010–2015) ===
Wilson and Beggins met while touring as back-up musicians for a Danish indie act called The Migrant. They began writing songs together in the backseat of the tour van and found they worked very well as a songwriting team. Both had just been through the end of relationships, which provided both common ground and writing material. Beggins had brought a ukulele from his father's instrument collection simply because it was small enough to comfortably pass around in a van (Beggins played accordion with The Migrant). By the end of the tour the two had written several songs and began recording their first album upon their return to Austin. To complete the sound they were seeking, they called in other local musicians and friends to help record, which eventually became the full Wild Child band.

Their self-recorded first album, the 15-track Pillow Talk, was released on October 25, 2011 (with help from San Francisco producers Evan Magers and Alex Peterson, and mastered by Erik Wofford). The album was received positively on many blogs and yielded a number one single on the music promotion site The Hype Machine.

Their second album, The Runaround, was released on October 8, 2013 via The Noise Company and produced by Ben Kweller. Kweller liked the band's debut album and sought out the band seeking to produce their sophomore effort. The album was funded in part through a successful Kickstarter campaign which raised over $40,000. It was recorded in January 2013.

The first single from the album, "Crazy Bird", was received extremely positively, reaching number one on the music promotion site The Hype Machine, debuting number one the FMBQ SubModern/Specialty charts, and being featured on World Cafe. Reviews for the album were positive, including a rating of 8/10 from PopMatters. The song "Living Tree" was named in the 'Top Ten Songs of 2013' by NPR.

=== With Dualtone Records (2015–present) ===
The band began recording their third album, Fools, in the fall of 2014 in Savannah, Georgia. The remainder of the tracking was finished in late December 2014. When the band returned to Austin they enlisted Atlantic Recording Artist Max Frost to produce the track "Break Bones", and local producer Chris "Frenchie" Smith to mix the album. The band signed with Dualtone Records in April 2015 after A&R Will McDonald caught the band's set at South by Southwest the month before. Fools was released October 2, 2015 worldwide via Dualtone Records and via Dine Alone Records in Canada. The album was met with strong critical reception, praised by most critics as a "step out" for the band as they continued to grow their sound and toy with more pop arrangements. Fools reached #18 on the Americana/Folk chart and #14 on the Heatseakers chart.

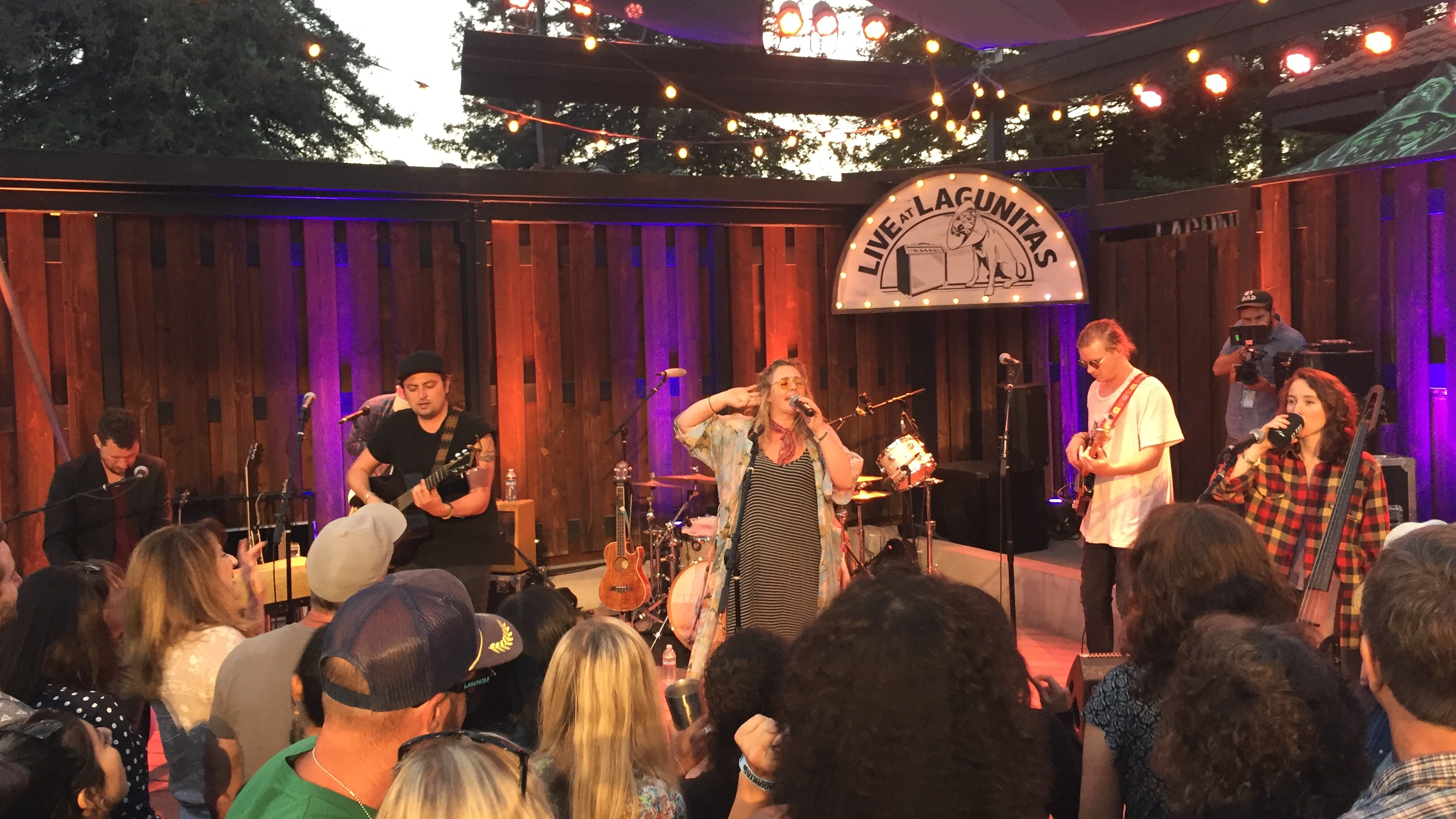
Wild Child performing at the Lagunitas Brewing Company in Petaluma, California in July 2018.

Wild Child recorded their fourth album, Expectations, in 2017 working with several producers including Chris Walla (formerly Death Cab For Cutie), Matthew Logan Vasquez (Delta Spirit), Chris Boosahda (Shakey Graves), Scott McMicken (Dr. Dog), Adrian Quesada (Grupo Fantasma), and Max Frost. The band announced the album in November 2017 while debuting the lead singles "Think It Over" and "Expectations". The album was released on February 9, 2018 and peaked at #6 on the US Heatseakers chart and #23 on the Americana/Folk Albums chart.

Wild Child announced their intent to record a fifth album on October 30, 2020. Citing the touring constraints during the pandemic, the band fundraised with its social media following. On January 31, 2023 the band announced their fifth studio album End of the World would release on March 31, 2023 on Reba's Ranch Records.

== Members ==
- Kelsey Wilson — lead vocals and violin
- Alexander Beggins — lead vocals and baritone ukulele
- Sadie Wolfe — cello
- Tyler Osmond — bass
- Matt Bradshaw — keyboard and trumpet
- Cody Ackors — guitar and trombone
- Tom Myers — drums

== Discography ==
Pillow Talk, 2011
No.	Title	Length
1.	"The Escape"	3:11
2.	"Silly Things"	4:14
3.	"That's What She Say"	4:03
4.	"Darling Divine"	3:58
5.	"Someone Else"	3:43
6.	"Whiskey Dreams"	2:40
7.	"Winter Pockets"	1:18
8.	"Cocaine Hurricane"	2:44
9.	"Warm Body"	4:56
10.	"I'll Figure You Out"	4:59
11.	"Real Estate"	3:27
12.	"Pillow Talk"	4:18
13.	"Day Dreamer"	3:54
14.	"Bridges Burning"	3:28
15.	"Tale Of You & Me"	5:39
Total length:		56:38

The Runaround, 2013
No.	Title	Length
1.	"The Runaround"	3:44
2.	"Victim to Charm"	4:11
3.	"Crazy Bird"	3:58
4.	"Coming Home"	2:45
5.	"Stitches"	3:49
6.	"Anna Maria"	3:27
7.	"This Place"	3:55
8.	"Here Now"	4:09
9.	"Living Tree"	3:34
10.	"Rillo Talk"	4:22
11.	"Left Behind"	4.07
Total length:		42:01

Fools, 2015
No.	Title	Length
1.	"Fools"	3:24
2.	"The Cracks"	3:45
3.	"Bullets"	3:14
4.	"Stones"	2:58
5.	"Meadows"	3:29
6.	"Break Bones"	3:46
7.	"Take It"	3:52
8.	"Saving Face"	2:51
9.	"Reno"	4:00
10.	"Oklahoma"	3:37
11.	"Bad Girl"	2:47
12.	"Trillo Talk"	3:36
Total length:		41:25

Expectations, 2018
No.	Title	Length
1.	"Alex"	2:56
2.	"Eggshells"	5:09
3.	"Back & Forth"	3:31
4.	"Think It Over"	3:54
5.	"Follow Me"	3:31
6.	"Expectations"	4:17
7.	"Sinking Ship"	4:07
8.	"My Town"	4:38
9.	"The One"	3:07
10.	"Break You Down"	3:22
11.	"Leave It Alone"	3:54
12.	"Goodbye Goodnight"	5:07
Total length:		47:33

1996 – Single, 2018
No.	Title	Length
1.	"1996"	3:07
2.	"Hold On, Hold You"	2:58
3.	"Best Lay"	3:37
Total length:		9:42

End of the World – 2023
No.	Title	Length
1.	"Bottom Line"	3:00
2.	"Cheap Champagne"	3:53
3.	"Could've Fooled Me"	4:12
4.	"Dear John"	3:14
5.	"End of the World"	2:42
6.	"Good Luck"	4:27
7.	"Love On a Bad Day"	3:32
8.	"Photographs"	3:18
9.	"Ride With Me"	3:25
10.	"Sleeping In"	3:51
11.	"Underwhelmed"	2:58
12.	"Wearing Blue"	4:07
Total length:		42:39

== Awards and performances ==
The band was named by the Austin Chronicle as the Best Indie Band and Best Folk Band in Austin at the 2013 South by Southwest (SXSW) music festival. In 2014, the band was again named Best Indie Band.

In May 2014, Wild Child appeared on The Late Late Show with Craig Ferguson. During the summer of 2014 the band had a breakout performance at Bonnaroo Music Festival attracting an unprecedented crowd of over 5,000 to the sonic stage drawing comparisons to Lucius. The band also performed at Wakarusa Music and Camping Festival and Firefly Music Festival drawing critical acclaim from The Philadelphia Inquirer. Wild Child appeared on Last Call With Carson Daly on December 10, 2015.

Wild Child headlined KGRS's Blues On The Green music series in their hometown of Austin, Texas on June 22, 2016 drawing one of the largest crowds in the event's history, estimated at 25,000 people.

== In popular culture ==
- "Crazy Bird" from The Runaround appears in the 2014 episode "#drama" of Awkward.
- "Meadows" from Fools was featured in the 2015 episode "Chapter 28" of Jane The Virgin.
- "Bad Girl" from Fools appeared in the 2016 episode "Things We Lost in the Fire" of The Vampire Diaries.
- "Fools" from Fools appears in the 2016 episode "Girls Gone Viral" of Awkward.
- "Meadows" from Fools appears in the 2017 episode "In the Eye Abides the Heart" of Pretty Little Liars.
