= Hymns (band) =

Brooklyn-based rock band

- Origin: Brooklyn, New York City, United States
- Genres: Rock, Folk rock, Indie rock, College rock, Country rock
- Years active: 2003–present
- Label: Blackland
- Members: Brian Harding; Jason Roberts; Joey McClellan; Austin Schumacher
- Past members: Matt Shaw; Jeremy Kay; Matt Cole; Tony Kent
- Website: myspace.com/hymnsband

Hymns is an indie rock band based in Brooklyn, New York. Originally consisting of North Carolina natives Brian Harding (vocals, guitar) and Jason Roberts (guitar, wurlitzer), the band picked up Texas-based rockers Tony Kent (drums) and Matt Shaw (bass guitar) upon arriving in New York City. Since debuting with the "infectious" Brother/Sister the Hymns have been steadily gaining in popularity, appearing with such headliners as Ben Kweller, Hot Hot Heat, Beck, and the Sam Roberts Band. In 2008, the band released their second album, Travel in Herds, on the Blackland Records label. Spin Magazine named them as one of the artists to watch in 2008.

== Background ==
The band is a result of a lifelong friendship between Brian Harding and Jason Roberts, who formed it while attending Appalachian State University. Following their graduation, the power-duo temporarily disbanded, with Roberts joining the Ben Kweller band while Brian relocated to New York City. During Roberts' stint with Ben Kweller, the lead guitarist met and became close with band-member John Kent, who went on to form Blackland Records located in Celeste, TX. After hearing some of the band's work, John quickly signed the band in 2005, along with Roberts, who quit his day job to jump back on board.

During recording sessions at "The Vault" (Blackland Records), the band met up with Matt Shaw and Tony Kent, two local musicians who shared the band's common background of being childhood friends. With the addition to the band, Brian and Jason's dream had finally become a reality, and the group quickly started the recording process, releasing their debut album Brother/Sister in the Fall of 2006. This record release generated national attention with publications such as Spin Magazine, The New Yorker, and MTV News started taking notice. With their newly acquired popularity, the band appeared with popular artists, including Ben Kweller, the Redwalls, and Butch Walker.

Amidst national tours, the band returned to the studio in 2007 to record their second album, Travel in Herds, which was released in the spring of 2008.

During SXSW 2009, Hymns hired Nick Stewart as UK Management. They released new tracks, via the Appaloosa EP, on July 21, 2009. Joey McClellan and Austin Schumacher join the band for this third installment of addicting sounds.

== Members ==
- Brian Harding (vocals, guitar)
- Jason Roberts (guitar, Wurlitzer)
- Joey McClellan (gass guitar)
- Austin Schumacher (drums)

== Discography ==
- Brother/Sister (2006, Blackland Records)
- Travel in Herds (2008, Blackland Records)
- Appaloosa EP (2009, Blackland Records)
