= Changing Horses =

Changing Horses may refer to:

- Changing Horses (Incredible String Band album), 1969
- Changing Horses (Ben Kweller album), 2009
