= Cover the Mirrors =

Studio album by Ben Kweller
- Released: May 30, 2025
- Genre: Indie rock
- Length: 43:45
- Label: The Noise Company

Ben Kweller chronology
Circuit Boredom (2021)	Cover the Mirrors (2025)

Singles from Cover the Mirrors
- 1. "Optimystic" Released: December 13, 2024; 2. "Dollar Store" Released: February 12, 2025; 3. "Oh Dorian" Released: May 27, 2025

Cover the Mirrors is the seventh studio album by American singer-songwriter Ben Kweller. The album is partially a tribute and remembrance of Kweller's 16-year-old son, Dorian, who tragically died in a car accident in 2023. It was recorded at the Noise Company in Dripping Springs, Texas and released on Dorian's birthday, May 30, 2025.

== Background ==
"Optimystic" was released as the first single of the album on December 13, 2024. It was followed by the second and third singles, "Dollar Store" and "Oh Dorian" on February 12 and May 27, 2025.

== Critical reception ==
Professional ratings
Review scores
Source	Rating
AllMusic	4.5/5 stars
New Noise	4/5 stars

Reviews of the album were generally positive, with many referencing its emotional depth and tribute function.

AllMusic's Fred Thomas rated the album 4.5 stars, calling it an "expression of crushing grief delivered with...hope and optimism."

Abby Johnston of The Austin Chronicle described the album as "honest, dynamic, and ripped wide open," highlighting "Oh Dorian" and "Dollar Store" as emotional anchors.

John Moore of New Noise called it "an emotional wrecking ball" and "a beautiful distillation of a father's love, admiration, and uncertainty."

== Track listing ==
No.	Title	Length
1.	"Going Insane"	3:42
2.	"Dollar Store" (featuring Waxahatchee)	3:24
3.	"Trapped"	2:49
4.	"Park Harvey Fire Drill"	2:25
5.	"Depression" (featuring Coconut Records)	2:45
6.	"Don't Cave"	4:02
7.	"Optimystic"	3:36
8.	"Brakes"	4:42
9.	"Killer Bee" (featuring the Flaming Lips)	2:48
10.	"Letter to Agony"	5:05
11.	"Save Yourself"	4:26
12.	"Oh Dorian" (featuring MJ Lenderman)	4:01
Total length:		43:45

== Personnel ==
- Ben Kweller – vocals, guitars, keys
- Chris Mintz-Plasse – bass
- Ryan Dean – drums
- Warren Hood – strings
- Waxahatchee – vocals on "Dollar Store"
- Coconut Records – vocals and keys on "Depression"
- The Flaming Lips – guitars and keys on "Killer Bee"
- MJ Lenderman – guitars on "Oh Dorian"

=== Production ===
- Producer – Ben Kweller
- Audio engineer – Steve Mazur
- Assistant engineer – Jackson Baker
- Mastering engineer – Howie Weinberg
