= EP Phone Home =

EP Phone Home may refer to:

- EP Phone Home (Ben Kweller EP), 2001
- EP Phone Home (Home Grown EP), 1999
