= The Candles =

American rock band

- Origin: New York City
- Genres: Rock, Folk rock, Indie rock
- Years active: 2008–present
- Label: The End Records
- Members: Josh Lattanzi (vocals, Guitar, Bass); Jason Roberts (Guitar, Bass, Vocals); Matt Pynn (Guitar, Steel Guitar); Greg Wieczorek (Drums, Percussion)
- Website: thecandlesmusic.com/Home.html

The Candles are an American rock band formed in New York City in 2009.

== Background Information ==
Steeped in the evocative, open-road Americana of bands like Gin Blossoms and Whiskeytown, New York City-based alt-rockers The Candles formed in 2009 around frontman Josh Lattanzi. A veteran singer-songwriter and multi-instrumentalist with a long résumé of collaborations under his belt, including Albert Hammond Jr., The Lemonheads, Norah Jones, and Ben Kweller, Lattanzi was raised on a steady diet of Grateful Dead, Big Star, and Neil Young. The Candles' debut long-player, Between the Sounds, arrived in 2010 on The End Records. The group's sophomore outing, La Candelaria, followed in 2013.

In 2012, Candles members Josh Lattanzi and Jason Roberts joined Norah Jones band to help her tour in support of her album Little Broken Hearts. In 2013, the Candles were recruited as the back up band by Alberta Cross for shows in the United States and Europe where they also served as the opening act. Shortly thereafter they joined Cory Chisel and The Wandering Sons for several tours as their backup band in addition to appearing as the opening act.

In 2016, the Candles released Matter + Spirit. The album featured the track Move Along (featuring Norah Jones) and the album received 3.5 stars in Rolling Stone Magazine.

In 2017 the Candles played three headlining shows in Tokyo, Japan at the Blue Note. These were the final shows in support of the album Matter + Spirit.

== Discography ==
- Between the Sounds (2010, The End Records)
- La Candelaria (2013, The End Records)
- Matter + Spirit (2016, The End Records)
