= Alberta Cross =

Rock band

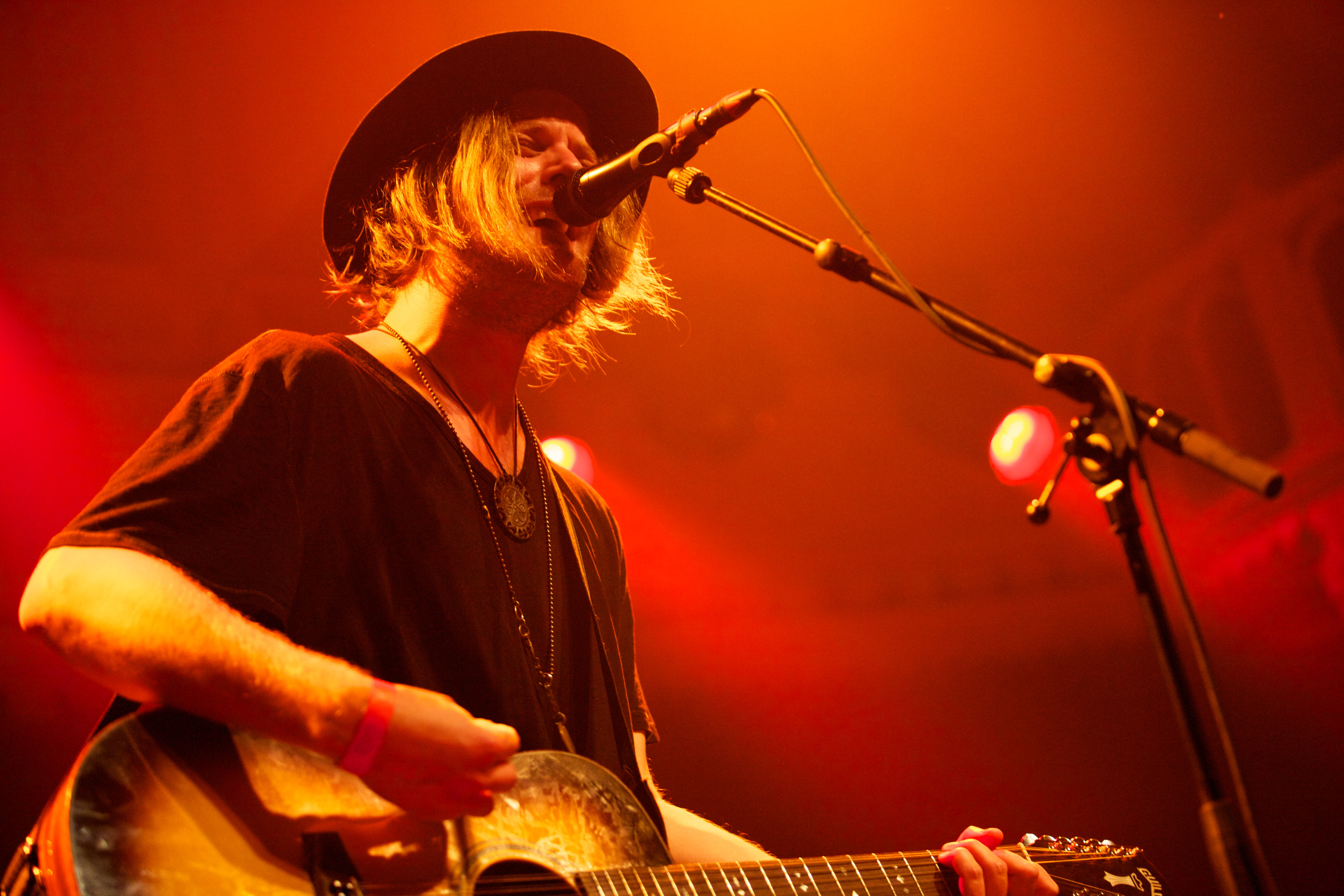
- Live Amsterdam Paradiso 2012

Background information
- Origin: East London, England
- Genres: Indie rock, alternative rock
- Years active: 2005–present
- Labels: Fiction Records; Geffen Records; ATO Records; Ark Recordings; Dine Alone Records; Dew Process
- Spinoff of: Historia
- Members: Petter Ericson Stakee
- Past members: Terry Wolfers
- Website: www.albertacross.net

Alberta Cross are an Anglo-Swedish rock band, formed in 2005 in London, England by singer-guitarist Petter Ericson Stakee and bassist Terry Wolfers.

In 2013 Wolfers left the band, leaving Stakee as the only permanent member. The band's official Facebook page lists band members as "Petter Ericson Stakee and friends!".

== History ==
Petter Ericson Stakee from Uppsala, Sweden, and Terry Wolfers from Waltham Forest, North East London, England met at Strongroom Bar & Kitchen in Shoreditch, East London in the early 2000s. Stakee grew up in a musical family with his father, singer-songwriter Peter R. Ericson and older brother leading the way. Wolfers joined Stakee's band Historia at a time when Stakee had begun writing new material that didn't suit the band. The duo developed and recorded the songs together in Wolfers' home studio in Highams Park, Waltham Forest and soon departed from the band to concentrate on the new material. They began playing acoustic gigs together in London before forming a live band with drummer Sebastian Sternberg and Stakee's brother John Alexander Ericson on keyboards. After four gigs as a band, they signed to Universal subsidiary Fiction Records in the UK and Europe and Geffen Records in the United States. In April 2007 the band released its debut, The Thief & the Heartbreaker, a collection of self-produced demos. In October 2007 the band, now with drummer Paul Cook, released the single/digital EP Leave Us Or Forgive Us.

== Touring ==
Since 2007, Alberta Cross have toured with bands and artists such as Oasis, Them Crooked Vultures (Dave Grohl, Josh Homme and John Paul Jones), Neil Young, Mumford And Sons, Rag N Bone Man, Portugal The Man, The Shins, Black Rebel Motorcycle Club, Norah Jones, Heartless Bastards, Daniel Johnston, Ringo Starr, Ben Harper, Black Francis (Pixies), Dave Matthews Band, and many more and played festivals all around the globe like Coachella, Glastonbury, Bonnaroo, Lollapalozza, Reading and Leeds, Fuji Rock Festival in Japan, Splendour In The Grass in Australia, Lowlands Festival, Pukkelpop, Southside and Hurricane Festival, Rock en Seine and many more plus doing countless of headline tours throughout North America, Europe and Australia.

== Broken Side Of Time ==
In early 2008 Stakee and Wolfers re-located to Brooklyn, New York to begin work on a new album. Once there, they decided to re-locate permanently to New York City. After a few low-key shows they caught the attention of ATO Records. In April 2008, with a desire to turn Alberta Cross into more of a band, the duo recruited new members drummer Austin Beede, guitarist Sam Kearney and keyboardist Alec Higgins and began work on new material together as a unit. After parting ways with Universal the band signed to Ark Recordings and PIAS in the UK and Europe.

The band recorded its debut album Broken Side of Time in Austin, Texas with producer Mike McCarthy. Stakee described it as "kind of a desperation album, a darker album; it's definitely angrier" in relation to the debut EP. The album was released in the United States in September 2009 via ATO Records and in the UK and Europe in October 2009 via Ark Recordings/PIAS. The band toured extensively across the United States, Canada, the UK, Europe, Australia and Japan.

== The Rolling Thunder ==
In the winter of 2010 the band began rehearsing new material in an old closed-for-the-season artists' hotel in the Byrdcliffe Artist Colony in the Catskill Mountains above Woodstock, New York, Petter has described it as "something out of The Shining." In early 2011 Stakee re-located to Silver Lake, Los Angeles to continue writing for the next album. Shortly afterwards, Wolfers and the rest of the band joined Stakee in Los Angeles and began recording sessions with producers Joe Chiccarelli and Mike Daly at the East West and Sunset Sound studios. However, Stakee and Wolfers were not happy with the results and parted ways with drummer Austin Beede and guitarist Sam Kearney, with Wolfers stating that "bringing other guys into the band on the last record changed things. I think we became aware that we wanted to bring back some of our original sound," with Stakee adding that "we always wanted to be two." Keyboardist Alec Higgins remained as an additional musician. The band returned to Brooklyn to work on additional material with producer Claudius Mittendorfer and revised the tracks recorded earlier in Los Angeles. In September 2011 the band released The Rolling Thunder EP as a tour/US indie record-shop-only release.

== Songs of Patience ==
The band's second full album Songs of Patience was released in the United States in July 2012 via ATO Records and September 2012 Ark Recordings/PIAS in the UK and Europe, with Stakee describing the album as "more colourful and a little less dark than our last record. It's a little warmer, maybe." Wolfers admitted that it was a struggle to make the record and that they had a hard time finishing it due to problems with their management, label and other band members. The previous band members were replaced by former Jeniferever drummer Fredrik Aspelin, from Stakee's hometown of Uppsala and guitarist Aaron Lee Tasjan. The band toured extensively across the United States, UK and Europe.

In September 2012, Wolfers revealed that he and Stakee were already working on songs for the next album and hoped it would be released as soon as possible as it had "been far too long between releases and we're not going to let industry or anyone get in the way again." Stakee stated that "I already have about 20 new songs and I feel for the next record I just want to bash it out". However, in March 2013 Stakee debuted a short-lived new lineup featuring drummer Fredrik Aspelin and members of New York band The Candles, bassist Josh Lattanzi, guitarist Jason Abraham Roberts and a keyboardist at a low-key gig at Drom in New York. In May 2013, new press shots taken to promote their tour of mainland Europe in June and July 2013 were posted online featuring the new lineup and it was finally announced in June that Wolfers had left the band amicably and that Stakee was now the only permanent band member.

== 2015-2026 ==
In late July 2014, following an unplugged acoustic residency at the Randolph in Williamsburg, Brooklyn and at 11 Street bar in the East Village through May and June, Stakee began work on a new studio album in a former church converted to a studio named Dreamland, near Woodstock, New York. The self-titled album was released in October 2015 and the band toured North America in early 2016.

Stakee sang backing vocals on Norah Jones' album Daybreaks and Stakee, Jones and Valerie June sang backing vocals together on an Aloysius 3 album. Alberta Cross was invited to play Ringo Starr's birthday party outside the Capitol Records building in Los Angeles. Stakee also did a solo tour through North America with Erika Wennerstrom from Heartless Bastards. Alberta Cross toured with Norah Jones and was also the backing band for two songs on Ringo Starr's new album that Stakee also produced.

After rolling out several new songs over the course of 2019, Alberta Cross released the digital-only album What Are We Frightened Of? on 26 June 2020. All songs on the album were co-written by Stakee and the album's producer, Luke Potashnick.

A new album, Sinking Ships, was released on 31 March 2023, followed by singles "Nothing Out There" on Sept. 29, "Crooked House" on Nov. 17 and "So Far Out Of Reach" on Dec. 15.

In 2024, Alberta Cross released singles "Never Going To Walk Way" on Feb. 2, "Watch Me Fall Down" on March 1, "Born In Amazement" on April 5 and "Vagabond" on May 3.

Several more singles were released in 2026.

== Band name ==
Stakee originally claimed that the name "Alberta Cross" was an anagram, but wouldn't reveal what for. Former drummer Austin Beede admitted he wasn't aware of the name's origin, but stated that there had been rumours that it was taken from a street name. Wolfers insinuated that the official story of the name being an anagram wasn't true, stating that they had "kind of been toying around with what it is. We've been saying it's an anagram – we don't want to give it away you see, it's nice because it's quite a strange name". In 2011, Stakee admitted that they were "just saying it's an anagram to piss people off".

== Popular culture ==
The song "Low Man" is heard at the end of episode 8 of Season 2 of Californication, when Karen tells Hank she has to see a man about a horse. This song is also used in episode 2 of Season 2 of the FX show Sons of Anarchy and in Season 1, Episode 4 of Longmire.

The song "Lucy Rider" is heard in the series premiere of the BBC One series Survivors as well as episode 3 of Season 1 of Dirty Sexy Money and in the TV show Elementary.

The band performed "ATX" and "Rise from the Shadows" on Last Call with Carson Daly. "ATX" was also used as the rejoiner bumper during the telecast of the 2009 BCS Championship Game.

The band appeared on the Cinemax Tour Stories program, which featured an interview and live performance.

"Money for the Weekend", from Songs of Patience, was played live by the band on the Late Show With David Letterman in 2012.

The song "Money for the Weekend" is featured on the soundtrack to Madden NFL 12 and on several Ketel One commercials that began to air in May 2011. Stakee is featured prominently in the commercials, wearing his trademark hat and sipping Ketel One on the rocks.

"Bonfires", a song from the 2015 self-titled album, is heard in episode 5 of season 1 of "Off the Map", in C.S.I and Hawaii Five 02.

"Ophelia On My Mind", from Songs Of Patience, is heard in the American TV show "Arrow".

The song "Find A Home Out There", from What Are We Frightened Of?, is heard twice in the new American ABC TV show "A Million Little Things".

The song "Ghost Of City Life" was heard in the US TV show "Mayans MC" on FX

== Discography ==
- The Thief & the Heartbreaker (mini-album) (April 2007)
- Broken Side of Time (September 2009)
- The Rolling Thunder (limited-edition EP) (September 2011)
- Songs of Patience (July 2012)
- Alberta Cross (October 2015)
- What Are We Frightened Of? (June 2020)
- Sinking Ships (March 2023)

== Band members ==
- Petter Ericson Stakee – vocals, guitar

== Past members ==
- Terry Wolfers – bass guitar, vocals
- John Alexander Ericson – keys
- Sebastian Sternberg – drums
- Paul Cook – drums
- Alec Higgins – keys
- Sam Kearney – guitars
- Austin Beede – drums
- Fredrik Aspelin – drums
- Aaron Lee Tasjan – guitars
- Dan Iead - guitar and pedal steel
- Jason Abraham Roberts – guitars, vocals
- Josh Lattanzi – bass, vocals
