= Radish (disambiguation) =

Radish usually refers to the common radish, a summer radish with a round red root.

It may also refer to:

- Daikon, the long-rooted East Asian white radish
- Other species and varieties of the genus Raphanus
- Radish (band), a Texan sugar metal band
