= Brother Sister (disambiguation) =

Brother Sister is a 1994 album by Brand New Heavies

Brother Sister or variants may also refer to:

- Brother, Sister, album by MewithoutYou
- Brother/Sister, album by Hymns
- "Brother, Sister", single by Sahara Beck
- The Brother/Sister Plays trilogy Tarell Alvin McCraney

== See also ==
- Anna Thangi (disambiguation)
