= Restraining Bolt =

Studio album by Radish
- Released: April 22, 1997
- Recorded: June 1996; November 1996
- Studios: Sheffield (Baltimore); Fort Apache (Boston)
- Genres: Alternative rock; grunge; post-grunge
- Length: 48:42
- Label: Mercury
- Producers: Roger Greenawalt; Sean Slade; Paul Q. Kolderie

Radish chronology
Dizzy (1995)	Restraining Bolt (1997)

Restraining Bolt is the final studio album by American alternative rock band Radish, released in 1997. Ben Kweller, the group's frontman, was 15 at the time the album was released. The album was a commercial failure, selling only 13,000 copies by March 1998.

== Critical reception ==
Professional ratings
Review scores
Source	Rating
AllMusic	2.5/5 stars
Robert Christgau	(2-star Honorable Mention)
Drowned in Sound	7/10
Entertainment Weekly	B−
Los Angeles Times	3/4 stars
NME	5/10
Rolling Stone	2.5/5 stars
USA Today	1.5/4 stars
Vox	8/10
Wall of Sound	72/100

The Village Voice noted that "Kweller plays the roar that was grunge's revenge for punk like a teen gymnast executes a vault: there's a correct form and you follow it."

== Track listing ==
1. Little Pink Stars
2. Simple Sincerity
3. Failing and Leaving
4. Dear Aunt Arctica
5. Sugar Free
6. Today's Bargain
7. The You in Me
8. Still I Wait
9. A Promise
10. Apparition of Purity
11. My Guitar
12. Bedtime

== Personnel ==
Personnel per liner notes.

Radish

- Ben Kweller - guitar, vocals
- Bryan Blur - bass
- John Kent - drums

Production

- Roger Greenawalt - production (2–6, 9, 10, 12)
- Sean Slade - production (1, 7, 8, 11), additional production (2–6, 9, 10, 12), mixing
- Paul Q. Kolderie - production (1, 7, 8, 11), additional production (2–6, 9, 10, 12), mixing
