= Sha Sha (album) =

Studio album by Ben Kweller
- Released: Version 1: 2000 (CD-R) Version 2: March 5, 2002 (US); March 25, 2002 (UK) 20th Anniversary Edition: March 10, 2023 (3 discs)
- Recorded: 1999
- Studio: Muscle Shoals, Sheffield, Alabama; Sear Sound, New York City
- Genre: Indie rock, power pop
- Length: 45:02
- Label: ATO
- Producer: Stephen Harris

Ben Kweller chronology
EP Phone Home (2001)	Sha Sha (2000)	On My Way (2004)

Singles from Sha Sha
- 1. "Wasted and Ready" Released: 2002

Professional ratings
Aggregate scores
Source	Rating
Metacritic	69/100
Review scores
Source	Rating
AllMusic	4.5/5 stars
Austin Chronicle	3/5 stars
The Guardian	2/5 stars
NME	6/10
Pitchfork	6.7/10
The Village Voice	(choice cut)

Sha Sha is the debut album by American indie rock singer, songwriter, multi-instrumentalist and former Radish member Ben Kweller. The album was originally composed of outtakes from sessions for Radish's unreleased album Discount Fireworks. It was self-released by Kweller, via CD-R, in 2000. In 2002, ATO Records released a second version of the album with a radically different track listing featuring many new recordings and songs.

== Track listing ==
All tracks written by Ben Kweller except where noted.

=== 2000 CD-R version (PA 101) ===
1. "Launch Ramp"
2. "Next Time"
3. "Drink Me Away"
4. "How It Should Be (Sha Sha)" (Joe Butcher/Ben Kweller)
5. "Wasted and Ready"
6. "In Other Words"
7. "What It's Like to Live in Commerce" (AKA: "Commerce, TX")
8. "Silent Scene"
9. "Girl in Between"
10. "4.40 (Episode 2)"

=== 2002 ATO Records version (07863 68114-2) ===
1. "How It Should Be (Sha Sha)" – 1:49 (Joe Butcher/Ben Kweller)
2. "Wasted & Ready" – 3:51
3. "Family Tree" – 4:20
4. "Commerce, TX" – 3:52
5. "In Other Words" – 5:36
6. "Walk on Me" – 3:55
7. "Make It Up" – 4:50
8. "No Reason" – 3:51
9. "Lizzy" – 4:06
10. "Harriet's Got a Song" – 4:50
11. "Falling" – 4:04

=== 2023 20th Anniversary Edition Bonus Discs ===
==== Disc 2 (Demos & Outtakes) ====
1. "Falling - Brooklyn Demo"
2. "Walk on Me - Brooklyn Demo"
3. "Lizzy - Brooklyn Demo"
4. "Lizzy - LA Demo"
5. "Ballad of Wendy Baker - Brooklyn Demo"
6. "How It Should Be (Sha Sha) - Brooklyn Demo" (Joe Butcher/Ben Kweller)
7. "Walk on Me - Live at The Double Door"
8. "Make It Up - Brooklyn Demo"
9. "No Reason - Brooklyn Demo"
10. "No Reason (feat. Nils Lofgren) Live at The Marquee"

==== Disc 3 (B-sides & Rarities) ====
1. "Today" (William Patrick Corgan)
2. "Psycho Girl" (Michael Donceel & Jonathan Jeter/ Ben Kweller)
3. "I Have the Power"
4. "Kokomo (with Adam Green)" (Mike Love/Scott McKenzie/Terry Melcher/John Phillips)
5. "Debbie Don't Worry Doll"
6. "My Drug Buddy - Live at The Mercury Lounge" (Evan Griffith Dando)
7. "SHS-10r"
8. "It's Up to You"
9. "It's Up to You (feat. Evan Dando) Live at The Brattle Theatre"
10. "Undone - The Sweater Song (feat. Juliana Hatfield) Live at Fletchers" (Rivers Cuomo)
11. "Lollipop" (Julius Dixon/Beverly Ross)
12. "It's Not Fair"

== Personnel ==
- Ben Kweller – lead vocals, guitar, piano
- John Kent – drums (also backing vocals on PA-101 version)
- Josh Lattanzi – bass
- Debbie Williams – bass (PA-101 version)
- Joe Butcher – bass (PA-101 version)
- Jane Scarpantoni – string arrangements
- Steve Mazur – engineer
- Stephen Harris – producer, mixing, engineer
- Roger Greenawalt – producer
- C. Taylor Crothers – photography
- Mike Waring – photography
- Liz Smith – photography
- Brett – art direction
- Greg Calbi – mastering

== Charts ==
=== Album ===
Chart performance for Sha Sha
Chart (2003)	Peak position
Australian Albums (ARIA)	82

=== Singles ===
Year	Single	Peak positions
Year	Single	Modern Rock Tracks
2002	"Wasted and Ready"	29
