= Travel in Herds =

Studio album by Hymns
- Released: March 11, 2008
- Recorded: 1998
- Genre: Rock, Folk rock, Indie rock, Country rock
- Length: 42:34
- Label: Blackland Records

Hymns chronology
Brother/Sister (2006)	Travel in Herds (2008)

Travel in Herds is the second studio album by the band Hymns. It was released by Blackland Records on March 11, 2008. Since the release of this album, Hymns have been recognized by Spin magazine as one of the bands to watch out for in 2008.

== Track listing ==
1. NYC Nervous Breakdown - 2:45
2. I Can't Be What You Want - 3:30
3. LA, or Barbette Sange - 3:35
4. Streets Alone - 3:42
5. St. Sebastian - 2:42
6. Time Told Me - 3:41
7. Train Song - 4:48
8. Blame it on the Mountains - 3:38
9. Travel in Herds - 3:18
10. Off My Mind - 3:38
11. On the Run - 7:17
