= Circuit Boredom =

Studio album by Ben Kweller
- Released: December 17, 2021
- Genres: Indie rock, Power pop
- Label: The Noise Company

Ben Kweller chronology
Go Fly a Kite (2012)	Circuit Boredom (2021)	Cover the Mirrors (2025)

Circuit Boredom is the sixth studio album by American singer-songwriter Ben Kweller, released on December 17, 2021.

== Background and release ==
On June 23, 2018, Kweller posted on Instagram that he would be releasing a new album soon.

On January 22, 2019, after he and his family survived carbon monoxide poisoning during a vacation in New Mexico, Kweller announced his return to music. Co-produced by Dwight A. Baker, the album was released over the course of a year through multiple singles, beginning with "Heart Attack Kid", released on February 8, 2019.

Kweller's music video for Heart Attack Kid was made in collaboration with Robert Strange of Superorganism and released on February 19, 2019.

Other singles include "Just for Kids", "Only a Day", and "Starz". Circuit Boredom was released worldwide on Friday, December 17, 2021. In 2022, The Noise Company promoted the album with a radio campaign for the single "American Cigarettes". A limited-edition vinyl was made available on Kweller's website.

== Track listing ==
All tracks are written by Ben Kweller.

No.	Title	Length
1.	"Starz"	4:02
2.	"Only a Day"	3:30
3.	"Just for Kids"	4:14
4.	"American Cigarettes"	3:38
5.	"Heart Attack Kid"	2:53
6.	"Carelesss"	3:36
7.	"Hold Me Down"	3:09
8.	"Wanna Go Home"	2:59
Total length:		28:01

== Personnel ==
=== Musicians ===
- Ben Kweller – vocals, guitars, keyboards
- Matter McDonald – bass guitar
- Daniel Creamer – synth bass, keyboards
- John D. Kent – drums, percussion
- Aaron Winston – choir
- Cassie Shankman – choir
- Daisy O'Conner – choir
- Dan Dyer – choir
- Drew Pressman – choir
- Dwight A. Baker – choir
- Israel Nash – choir
- Jonny Shane – choir
- Little Dan – choir
- Mike Meadows – choir
- Raina Rose – choir

=== Technical ===
- Ben Kweller – producer, mixing
- Dwight A. Baker – producer, audio engineer, mixing
- Howie Weinberg – mastering
