= Broken Side of Time =

Studio album by Alberta Cross
- Released: September 21, 2009
- Genres: Indie rock, alternative country, blues rock
- Length: 44:00
- Labels: Ark Recordings (UK); ATO (US)
- Producer: Mike McCarthy

Alberta Cross chronology
Broken Side of Time (2009)	Songs of Patience (2012)

Singles from Broken Side of Time
- 1. "ATX" Released: August 9, 2009; 2. "Taking Control" Released: November 23, 2009; 3. "Old Man Chicago" Released: March 8, 2010

Professional ratings
Review scores
Source	Rating
Clash	(8/10)
Drowned in Sound	(6/10)
Kerrang!	3/5 stars
The Music Fix	(9/10)
NME	(8/10)
the WILD honey pie	(8.4/10)

Broken Side of Time is the debut full-length album from Alberta Cross, released in the UK on September 21, 2009, and in the United States on January 19, 2010.

== Track listing ==
All tracks are written by Petter Ericson Stakee except where noted.

No.	Title	Writer(s)	Length
1.	"Song Three Blues"		3:18
2.	"ATX"	Stakee, Terry Wolfers, Sam Kearney, Austin Beede, Alec Higgins	4:45
3.	"Taking Control"		4:22
4.	"Old Man Chicago"		3:08
5.	"Broken Side of Time"		5:15
6.	"Rise from the Shadows"	Stakee, Kearney	6:50
7.	"City Walls"	Stakee, Kearney	3:37
8.	"The Thief & the Heartbreaker"		4:41
9.	"Leave Us and Forgive Us"		3:22
10.	"Ghost of City Life"		5:19

== Press ==
- "...A British take on Southern rock… the seismic guitars and high vocals look to My Morning Jacket, Kings of Leon and Crazy Horse… but Alberta Cross sets aside those American bands' redemptive undercurrents of blues and gospel; instead it plunges into the very English despair of bands like Pink Floyd." – The New York Times
- "…Familiar and refreshing... Alberta Cross has taken incredible strides to earn global recognition." – NPR
- "Combining wind tunnels of bent guitar riffs and distorted power chords with the haunting melodies of rural American music. It's all topped by Ericson Stakee's sweet, high-lonesome voice, which recalls both Jim James and Neil Young." – Rolling Stone
- "…Fog-clearing pipes nod to MMJ's Jim James, and whose South-of-the-Mason-Dixon guitar chops recall the Followill Bros." – Spin
- "…An intoxicating mix of apocalyptic riffs, sob – worthy singalongs and brooding blues." (8 out of 10) – NME
- "…As electrically dark as it is electrifyingly determined… these ten songs have a kind of will of their own to reach our eardrums and come out the other side as goose bumps." – Esquire
- "…A hard-hitting, rock-driven affair, with folk and soul undertones." – BlackBook
- "There is an expansive, widescreen nature to Alberta Cross' music that that conjures equal parts intimacy and elevation." - Kerrang!
