= Anna Thangi =

Anna Thangi (lit. 'Brother Sister') may refer to:

- Anna Thangi (1958 film), an Indian Kannada-language film
- Anna Thangi (2005 film), an Indian Kannada-language drama film
- Anna Thangi (TV series), an Indian Kannada-language soap opera

== See also ==
- Brother Sister (disambiguation)
