= Songs of Patience =

Studio album by Alberta Cross
- Released: July 16, 2012
- Genre: Alternative rock
- Length: 43:03
- Label: ATO

Alberta Cross chronology
Broken Side of Time (2009)	Songs of Patience (2012)	Alberta Cross (2015)

Songs of Patience is the second full studio album by alternative rock band Alberta Cross.

== Reception ==
Professional ratings
Aggregate scores
Source	Rating
Metacritic	65/100
Review scores
Source	Rating
AllMusic	4.5/5 stars
Paste	6/10
PopMatters	7/10 stars
Spin	5/10

Songs of Patience received mixed reviews. At Metacritic, which assigns a normalized rating out of 100 to reviews from mainstream critics, the album received an average score of 65 based on 11 reviews, indicating "generally favorable reviews".

== Track listing ==
All tracks are written by Petter Ericson Stakee except where noted.

No.	Title	Writer(s)	Length
1.	"Magnolia"	Mike Daly, Petter Ericson Stakee	5:19
2.	"Crate of Gold"		3:03
3.	"Lay Down"		4:31
4.	"Come on Maker"		4:12
5.	"Ophelia on My Mind"		4:01
6.	"Wasteland"	Daly, Stakee	3:48
7.	"I Believe in Everything"		4:05
8.	"Money for the Weekend (Pocket Full of Shame)"		3:22
9.	"Life Without Warning"	Daly, Stakee	5:23
10.	"Bonfires"		5:17
Total length:			43:03

Deluxe Edition
No.	Title	Length
11.	"Ramblin' Home"	6:18
12.	"Wait"	5:35
