= The Sun's Dress =

- ثوب الشمس (Thoub Al Shams)
- Directed by: Saeed Salmin Al-Marri
- Written by: Saeed Salmin Al-Marri
- Produced by: Vision Film Production
- Starring: Mare'i Al Halyan; Habib Ghuloom; Nevine Madi; Sophia Jawad; Hamad Al Hammadi
- Release date: May 2014
- Running time: 90 minutes
- Country: United Arab Emirates
- Language: Arabic

The Sun's Dress is a 2014 Emirati film, classified as "suspense and excitement", directed by Saeed Salmin Al-Marri.

== Story and events of the film ==
This feature-length film addresses a significant social issue: the integration of people with disabilities into society. It follows the journey of a deaf young woman navigating numerous challenges in her daily life. The narrative unfolds across two different timelines "the past and the present" and spans two locations, Syria and the United Arab Emirates. While it portrays a love story that appears to have a universal appeal, the film dives deep into the heart of Emirati society, exploring its intricacies and local issues. On one level, it is a localized story about the life of Halima. However, on another, it tells a timeless tale that could resonate in any time or place.

== Cast and Crew ==
The Sun's Dress consists of a group of actors, including:

- Mare'i Al Halyan: An Emirati actor, author, and director (born 1965).
- Habib Ghuloom: An Emirati director and actor (born 1963).
- Nevine Madi: A Syrian actress based in the UAE (born 1992).
- Parween: A Bahraini actress; full name Parween Amanullah (born 1968).
- Sophia Jawad: An Iraqi actress and model (born in Lebanon, 1986).
- Hamad Al Hammadi: An Emirati actor and director.
- Ahmed Abdullah: An Emirati media personality.
- Hussein Mahmoud
- Nabih Arabi
- Raghda Hashem: A Syrian actress (born 1965).

== Highlights ==
- The film made its world premiere at the Abu Dhabi Film Festival and has since been screened at numerous international circuits, including the 4th Oran Arab Film Festival, the Damascus International Film Festival in Syria, the Hurghada Asian Film Festival, as well as festivals in San Francisco and Russia. It has garnered several accolades, notably an award at the Muscat International Film Festival.
- The Sun's Dress (Thoub Al Shams), delivers a powerful message to society on how to interact with the deaf and mute community, emphasizing their fundamental right to a dignified life. It sheds light on societal perceptions, asserting that a disability should never hinder one’s life journey. Wrapped in a romantic narrative full of conflict, the film carries a philosophical message about the innocent dreams of youth.
- This film marks the feature-length directorial debut of Salmin, who previously built a distinguished career with several short films that won numerous prestigious awards.

== See also ==
- list of films produced in the UAE
