= On My Way (Ben Kweller album) =

Studio album by Ben Kweller
- Released: April 6, 2004
- Recorded: 2004
- Studios: Sear Sound, New York City
- Genres: Indie, Rock
- Length: 42:24
- Label: ATO Records
- Producer: Ethan Johns

Ben Kweller chronology
Sha Sha (2002)	On My Way (2004)	Ben Kweller (2006)

Professional ratings
Aggregate scores
Source	Rating
Metacritic	74/100
Review scores
Source	Rating
Allmusic	3.5/5 stars
Pitchfork Media	(6.4/10)
Robert Christgau	(choice cut)
Rolling Stone	3/5 stars
Stylus	A−
Tiny Mix Tapes	2/5 stars

On My Way is the second album released by American singer-songwriter Ben Kweller. All songs were written by Kweller himself.

== Recording process ==
On My Way was recorded at the same studio (Sear Sound) as Kweller's debut album Sha Sha, but the approach was completely different. "I really wanted to capture the band that had been backing me up for the past year and a half. We recorded everything live, in one room without headphones and hardly any overdubs. I'm very proud of On My Way's spontaneity and honesty. I'm especially proud of the song "On My Way". I feel it's one of my best."

== Touring ==
The touring band for the album featured John Kent from Radish and Jason Roberts on guitar. On My Way was their first headlining tour in France. Ben Kweller also co-headlined with Death Cab for Cutie and Incubus in the US. Kweller also performed in Japan with Yeah Yeah Yeahs and the White Stripes. Towards the end of touring, Kweller opened for The Black Crowes at one of their Hammerstein reunion shows.

== Track listing ==
1. "I Need You Back" – 3:17
2. "Hospital Bed" – 3:37
3. "My Apartment" – 3:57
4. "On My Way" – 3:54
5. "The Rules" – 2:37
6. "Down" – 4:08
7. "Living Life" – 4:02
8. "Ann Disaster" – 3:08
9. "Believer" – 4:59
10. "Hear Me Out" – 3:44
11. "Different but the Same" – 5:02

== Personnel ==
- Ben Kweller - Lead Vocals, Guitar, Harmonica, Piano, Art Direction
- Josh Lattanzi - Bass guitar, Vocals
- Mike Stroud - Guitar, Vocals
- John Kent - Drums
- Fred Eltringham - Drums
- Steve Mazur - Engineer
- Steve Ralbovsky - A&R
- Brett Kilroe - Art Direction
- Greg Calbi - Mastering
- Ethan Johns - Percussion, Mixing, Engineer, Producer

== Charts ==
Chart performance for On My Way
Chart (2004)	Peak position
Australian Albums (ARIA)	100
US Billboard 200	83
