= EP Phone Home (Ben Kweller EP) =

EP by Ben Kweller
- Released: October 30, 2001
- Recorded: 2001
- Genres: Indie, rock
- Length: 21:21
- Label: BMG International
- Producer: Stephen R. Herek

Ben Kweller chronology
Freak Out, It's Ben Kweller (2000)	EP Phone Home (2001)	Sha Sha (2002)

Professional ratings
Review scores
Source	Rating
Allmusic	2.5/5 stars

EP Phone Home (2001) is American singer-songwriter Ben Kweller's first mass-produced CD in his solo career. This EP features bedroom recordings and Sha Sha demos.

== Track listing ==
All tracks by Ben Kweller, except as noted

1. "Launch Ramp" – 1:51
2. "How It Should Be (Sha Sha)" (Ben Kweller/Joe Butcher) – 1:41
3. "Debbie Don't Worry Doll" – 5:05
4. "Harriet's Got a Song" – 4:51
5. "Falling" – 4:01

== Personnel ==
- Ben Kweller - engineer, vocals, guitar, piano
- John Kent - drums
- Josh Lattanzi - bass guitar
- Jane Scarpantoni - string arrangements
- Stephen Harris - engineer
- Stephen R. Herek - producer
- Jack Pierson - photography
- Liz Smith - photography
- Bryce Goggin - engineer
