= Chris Morrissey =

American musician (born 1980)

Chris Morrissey (born August 15, 1980) is an American bassist, a singer, and a music director currently living in Brooklyn, New York. Morrissey has released seven records under his own name and has toured and recorded as a band member with Norah Jones, Mark Guiliana, Sara Bareilles, Boy George, Chris Thile, Aoife O’Donnovan, Jim Campilongo Trio, Mason Jennings, Dave King Trucking Company, Lucius, Margaret Glaspy and Trixie Whitley. As a music director, he has assembled and rehearsed bands for Sharon Van Etten, Maren Morris, Elle King, Blu DeTiger, as well as Bareilles and Whitley. He has been awarded commissions from The Jazz Gallery and Jazz Coalition and is a member of the adjunct faculty at The New School. His eighth recording is slated for release in early 2026 on GroundUP Music.

== Discography ==
As Leader

- The Morning World (2009, Sunnyside)
- Cannon Falls Forever (2011, self release)
- North Hero (2013, Sunnyside)
- Laughing and Laughing (2018, self release)
- Impact Winter Formal (2021, Edition Records)
- Grey Like The Color (2024 GroundUP Music)
- Live In Minnesota (2024 GroundUP Music)

With Mark Guiliana

- The Sound of Listening, Mark Guiliana (2022, Edition Records)
- BEAT MUSIC! BEAT MUSIC! BEAT MUSIC!, Mark Guiliana (2019, Motema Music)
- Jersey, Mark Guiliana (2018, Motema Music)
- Family First, Mark Guiliana Jazz Quartet (2015)

With Jim Campilongo

- Live at Rockwood Music Hall, Jim Campilongo (2018)
- Dream Dictionary, Jim Campilongo (2014)

With Margaret Glaspy

- Echo The Diamond, Margaret Glaspy (2023)
- Emotions and Math, Margaret Glaspy (2016)

With Sara Bareilles

- The Blessed Unrest, Sara Bareilles (2013)

With Ben Kweller

- Go Fly A Kite, Ben Kweller (2012)
- Changing Horses, Ben Kweller (2009)
- How Ya Lookin' Southbound, Come in?, Ben Kweller (2008)
- Sawdust Man, Ben Kweller (2008)

With Mason Jennings

- Live at First Ave, Mason Jennings (2010)
- In the Ever, Mason Jennings (2008)
- If You Need A Reason, Mason Jennings (2006)
- Use Your Voice, Mason Jennings (2004)
- Use Your Van, Mason Jennings (2004)

With Haley Bonar

- Big Star, Haley Bonar (2009)
- Only Xmas, Haley Bonar (2008)
- Lure The Fox, Haley Bonar (2006)

With Misc

- Fan Favorites, Rich Hinman vs Adam Levy (2024)
- Old TV, Dave King Trucking Company (2023)
- Surrounded by the Night, Dave King Trucking Co (2016)
- Wildewomen, Lucius (2013)
- Wish Bone, Bobby Long (2013)
- The Butterfly Bull, Nick Africano (2012)
- Happy Garden, Wishbook (2012)
- Astoria Boulevard, Astoria Boulevard (2011)
- In the Cool of the Day, Daniel Martin Moore (2011)
- Rave On Buddy Holly, Justin Townes Earle (2011)
- Tommy, Dosh (2010)
- Les Beaux Souvenirs Ne Meurent Jamais, Pierre Guimard (2009)
- Truce, Bill Mike Band (2008)
- Armchair Apocrypha, Andrew Bird (2007)
- Sparrows In The Bell, The Pines (2007)
- Better News, Bill Mike Band (2005)
- Two Become One, Matt Jennings (2005)
- Observations Assumptions, Cowboy Curtis (2004)
