= Brother Sister (Hymns album) =

Brother/Sister

Studio album by Hymns
- Released: October 10, 2006
- Recorded: 1998
- Genre: Indie rock, country rock
- Length: 42:44
- Label: Rock Ridge

Hymns chronology
Brother/Sister (2006)	Travel in Herds (2008)

Brother/Sister is the debut album by the band Hymns. It was released by Rock Ridge Music on October 10, 2006, and regarded as "infectious" by John Norris of MTV News.

== Track listing ==
1. Magazines - 3:21
2. Brother/Sister - 2:57
3. Friends of Mine - 4:08
4. C'mon, C'mon - 3:59
5. Power in the Street - 3:06
6. Scenery Glow - 4:04
7. First Time - 3:35
8. Stop Talking - 3:35
9. It's a Shame - 3:48
10. Starboat - 5:27
11. Town - 4:44
