= Changing Horses (Ben Kweller album) =

Studio album by Ben Kweller
- Released: February 2, 2009
- Recorded: 2007–2008
- Studios: Public Hi-Fi & Cedar Creek (Austin, Texas); Smith Street Studios (New York City)
- Genres: Country rock; alt-country; folk rock
- Length: 35:45
- Labels: ATO Records; Noise Co.
- Producer: Ben Kweller

Ben Kweller chronology
Ben Kweller (2006)	Changing Horses (2009)	Go Fly a Kite (2012)

Professional ratings
Aggregate scores
Source	Rating
Metacritic	69/100
Review scores
Source	Rating
AllMusic	3.5/5 stars
Alternative Press (magazine)	4/5 stars
Austin Chronicle	3/5 stars
No Ripcord	8/10 stars
Paste	50%
Pitchfork	5.3/10
PopMatters	8/10 stars
Rolling Stone	3/5 stars
Spin	3/5 stars
SSW	4/6 stars

Changing Horses is the fourth studio album by American singer-songwriter Ben Kweller which was released on February 2, 2009, in Europe and February 3, 2009, in the United States. It was initially scheduled for release in September 2008, but was delayed to 2009. Kweller has described the album as being more country in style than his previous releases. The album features rhythm section Chris Morrissey (bass) and Mark Stepro (drums). It also debuts the talents of Kitt Kitterman, Kweller's manager, who plays pedal steel guitar and Dobro. On November 23, 2008, the full album leaked onto the Internet. In a statement, ATO Records said the leak was not the final version of the album. The song "Hurtin' You" was debuted on Stereogum. The whole album was made available to stream exclusively on Last.fm.

== Track listing ==
1. "Gypsy Rose" – 4:56
2. "Old Hat" – 4:12
3. "Fight" – 2:54
4. "Hurtin' You" (featuring The Pierces) – 2:47
5. "Ballad of Wendy Baker" – 3:58
6. "Sawdust Man" – 4:12
7. "Wantin' Her Again" – 2:42
8. "Things I Like to Do" – 2:09
9. "On Her Own" – 4:01
10. "Homeward Bound" – 3:50

== Personnel ==
=== Musicians ===
- Ben Kweller – lead vocals, guitar, and piano
- Kitt Kitterman – pedal steel and dobro
- Mark Stepro – drums and backing vocals
- Chris Morrissey – bass and backing vocals
- "Fight" piano by Riley Osbourn
- "On Her Own" electric guitar by Greg Combs
- "Hurtin' You" bass/backing vocals by Josh Lattanzi, drums by Ben Kweller, and backing vocals by The Pierces
- "Ballad of Wendy Baker" strings by The Tosca String Quartet, arr. by Ben Kweller
- "Sawdust Man" claps by Steve Mazur, Rob Niederpruem, and Ben Kweller; percussion by Ben Kweller and Fred Remmert

=== Production ===
- Produced by Ben Kweller
- Recorded by Steve Mazur
- Mixed by Ben Kweller and Steve Mazur
- Mastered by Fred Kavorkian

== Charts ==
Chart performance for Changing Horses
Chart (2009)	Peak position
Australian Albums (ARIA)	68
US Billboard 200	92
