= Blackland Records =

- Founded: 2005
- Founder: John Kent, Tim Wheeler
- Location: Celeste, TX, United States
- Official website: blacklandrecords.com

Blackland Records is an independent record label that was incorporated in 2005 by John Kent and Tim Wheeler.

== Corporate history ==
Following John Kent's stint playing drums for Ben Kweller and Radish, businessman Tim Wheeler joined forces with the ex-rocker to form Blackland Records in 2005. After their incorporation, Blackland signed Brooklyn-based band Hymns, releasing their second album "Travel In Herds".
