= Ben Kweller (album) =

Studio album by Ben Kweller
- Released: September 19, 2006
- Recorded: Los Angeles, California
- Genre: Indie rock
- Length: 40:10
- Label: ATO
- Producer: Gil Norton

Ben Kweller chronology
On My Way (2004)	Ben Kweller (2006)	Changing Horses (2009)

Professional ratings
Aggregate scores
Source	Rating
Metacritic	74/100 link
Review scores
Source	Rating
AllMusic	link
Drowned in Sound	7/10 link
Gigwise	link
Harp	(positive) link
IGN	9.4/10 link
Rolling Stone	link
Pitchfork	5.5/10 link
This Is Fake DIY	link
URB	link
Yahoo! Music	link

Ben Kweller is the third album by American singer-songwriter Ben Kweller. It was released September 19, 2006 on ATO Records.

== One Minute Pop Song ==
For the 9 weeks leading up to the release of the album Ben Kweller previously took footage of himself and made an internet mini-show called One Minute Pop Song. Each episode would usually run for 2–6 minutes.

Topics of the videos were varied. Some of the topics were about a fan who sent in a cover version of a song, talking about laying down the tracks and playing all the instruments on the album, showing a tour of the studio, Ben Kweller rating himself on each instrument, telling a story about Neil Young, and talking about how he learned to play the drums from his father.

== Recording process ==
On his MySpace website, Kweller described the making of the album as "very exciting, emotional and challenging." He explained that since he played all the instruments on the album it "was a big change for me and it produced something really intimate and special. It's such a different way of working but if you can pull it off it makes a very cool and unique sound." He also described a song on the album, "A bonus for me, and you, is I think I might have written my best song while I was in the studio. It's called 'Thirteen'. It's very personal and almost hard for me to listen to."

"This Is War" off the album is featured in the 2011 film Diary of a Wimpy Kid: Rodrick Rules.

Kweller recorded the album without his usual backing band, opting instead to play all the instruments himself—including guitars, bass, drums, piano, harmonica, and glockenspiel—alongside producer Gil Norton.

== Track listing ==
All songs and instruments by Ben Kweller.

1. "Run" – 3:07
2. "Nothing Happening" – 3:53
3. "Sundress" – 4:06
4. "I Gotta Move" – 3:10
5. "Thirteen" – 4:17
6. "Penny on the Train Track" – 4:28
7. "I Don't Know Why" – 3:06
8. "Magic" – 3:08
9. "Red Eye" – 4:20
10. "Until I Die" – 4:07
11. "This Is War" – 2:25

== Personnel ==
- Matt Boynton – digital editing
- Adrian Bushby – mixing
- Brian Dawson – live sound engineer
- John Dunne – engineer
- Roger Greenawalt – demo engineer
- Sam Kersherbaum – photography
- Ben Kweller – art direction, design, photography, layout design, instrumentation
- Ray Lego – photography, cover photo
- Steve Mazur – engineer
- Sarah McGoldrick – design, layout design
- Gil Norton – producer, mixing, pre-production
- Michael Palmieri – photography
- Brian Thom – engineer
- Elizabeth Weinberg – photography
- Richard Woodcraft – engineer

== Charts ==
Chart performance for Ben Kweller
Chart (2006)	Peak position
French Albums (SNEP)	191
US Billboard 200	117
US Independent Albums (Billboard)	7
