= The Noise Company =

American independent record label and music management company

- Founded: 2007; 18 years ago
- Founder: Ben Kweller
- Distributor(s): Alternative Distribution Alliance
- Genre: Various
- Country of origin: U.S.
- Location: Austin, Texas, U.S.
- Official website: www.thenoisecompany.com

The Noise Company is an American independent record label and music management company based in Austin, Texas. The label was founded in 2007 by recording artist Ben Kweller. In 2009, Kweller stated in an Australian magazine that he recently parted ways with his long-time label-home, ATO Records in order to start a new company to release his music and help other artists. Over the years, NoiseCo (as it is often called) has grown from being a label, to an all-encompassing entertainment company that focuses on many aspects of its clients' careers. The Noise Company LLC was incorporated on January 22, 2011.

== Artists ==
- Amy Cook
- Ben Kweller
- Little Dan
- Modern Love Child
- Radish
- The Get You
- Wild Child
