= Radish (band) =

American post-grunge band

- Origin: Greenville, Texas, United States
- Genre: Post-grunge
- Years active: 1992–1999
- Label: Mercury Records
- Past members: Ben Kweller (vocals, guitar); John Kent (drums, vocals); Ryan Green (bass 1992–1995); Lorin Hamilton (bass 1995–1996); Bryan Blur (bass 1996–1998); Debbie Williams (bass, vocals 1998–1999); Josh Lattanzi (bass, vocals 1999–end); Joe Butcher (guitar, vocals 1998–1999)

Radish were an American post-grunge band. The band formed in 1993 by Ben Kweller, John Kent and Ryan Green. After signing to a major record label and a lot of initial press, the interest in them dissipated and they disbanded.

== History ==
The trio played locally in and around Greenville, Texas and recorded two independent releases, Hello (1994) and Dizzy (1996). Kweller sent a copy of Dizzy to guitarist Nils Lofgren, who grew up with Kweller's dad in Maryland. Lofgren was impressed with Radish and recommended them to Roger Greenawalt, who was producing Lofgren's album at the time, Damaged Goods. Greenawalt took the band under his wing and transformed their sound, so that he would be able to market them as "the American Silverchair"; an Australian band whom had found major success from being marketed as teenagers resembling Nirvana. After remoulding the band, he recorded a demo tape which was subsequently shopped around to US major record labels. After an unexpected bidding war, Radish eventually signed to Mercury Records to release the album Restraining Bolt, half of which was produced and mixed by Greenawalt, the other half by Sean Slade and Paul Kolderie. The record label and management's strategy was to market the band as having had a strong local following in and around Dallas, Texas so as to make the band appear to be authentic and hence to fabricate that their success and growth had been organic. The first single taken from the album, the UK-release "Little Pink Stars", gave them a top-40 hit in the UK, which was followed by "Simple Sincerity" which reached the top 50. Radish made appearances on The Weird Al Show, Late Night with Conan O'Brien, and Late Show with David Letterman. The band toured several times in Europe, including opening slots for Faith No More and Main Stage at Reading Festival '97. Radish released three 7" singles and two CD singles.

In 1998, Radish became a quartet featuring Joe Butcher (the Polyphonic Spree, UFOFU) on lead guitar and Debbie Williams on bass. Radish went to Muscle Shoals Studio in Alabama to record the musically ambitious follow-up to Restraining Bolt, entitled Discount Fireworx. The band recorded with producer Bryce Goggin (Pavement, The Lemonheads). While mixing Discount Fireworx in New York City, Kweller and Kent met bassist Josh Lattanzi, who became Radish's fifth and final bass player. As a result of PolyGram's merger with Universal Music Group, the band found themselves with a record label whom hadn't signed the band and didn't have a particular interest in them. The 18-song album was never released and Radish soon secured a release from their contract with Mercury Records. After the band was released from Mercury, they continued to play occasional shows around Dallas. In 1999, Kweller moved away from Texas to be able to live with his girlfriend/future wife, Liz Smith. After living in Connecticut for a few months, the couple decided to move to Brooklyn, New York where Kweller began his solo career and signed with ATO Records in 2001. Back in Texas, John Kent began to write songs of his own and formed the now-defunct band Pony League. He now fronts the band John David Kent and the Dumb Angels and runs the indie label Blackland Records and The Vault Recording Studio in Celeste, TX.

Their manager/head of label Danny Goldberg (formerly Nirvana's manager) commented to New Yorker journalist John Seabrook, regarding the aftermath of Radish's nosedive from notoriety that ''In the end, it all worked out for Mercury. We got our Christmas bonuses.''

== Discography ==
=== Studio albums ===
- Hello (1994) (self-released)
- Dizzy (1996) (self-released)
- Restraining Bolt (1997) (Mercury Label)
- Discount Fireworx (unreleased)

=== Singles ===
- "Dear Aunt Arctica" (1996), PolyGram
- "Little Pink Stars" (1997), Mercury - UK #32
- "Simple Sincerity" (1997), Mercury - UK #50
