= Ben Kweller =

American singer-songwriter (born 1981)

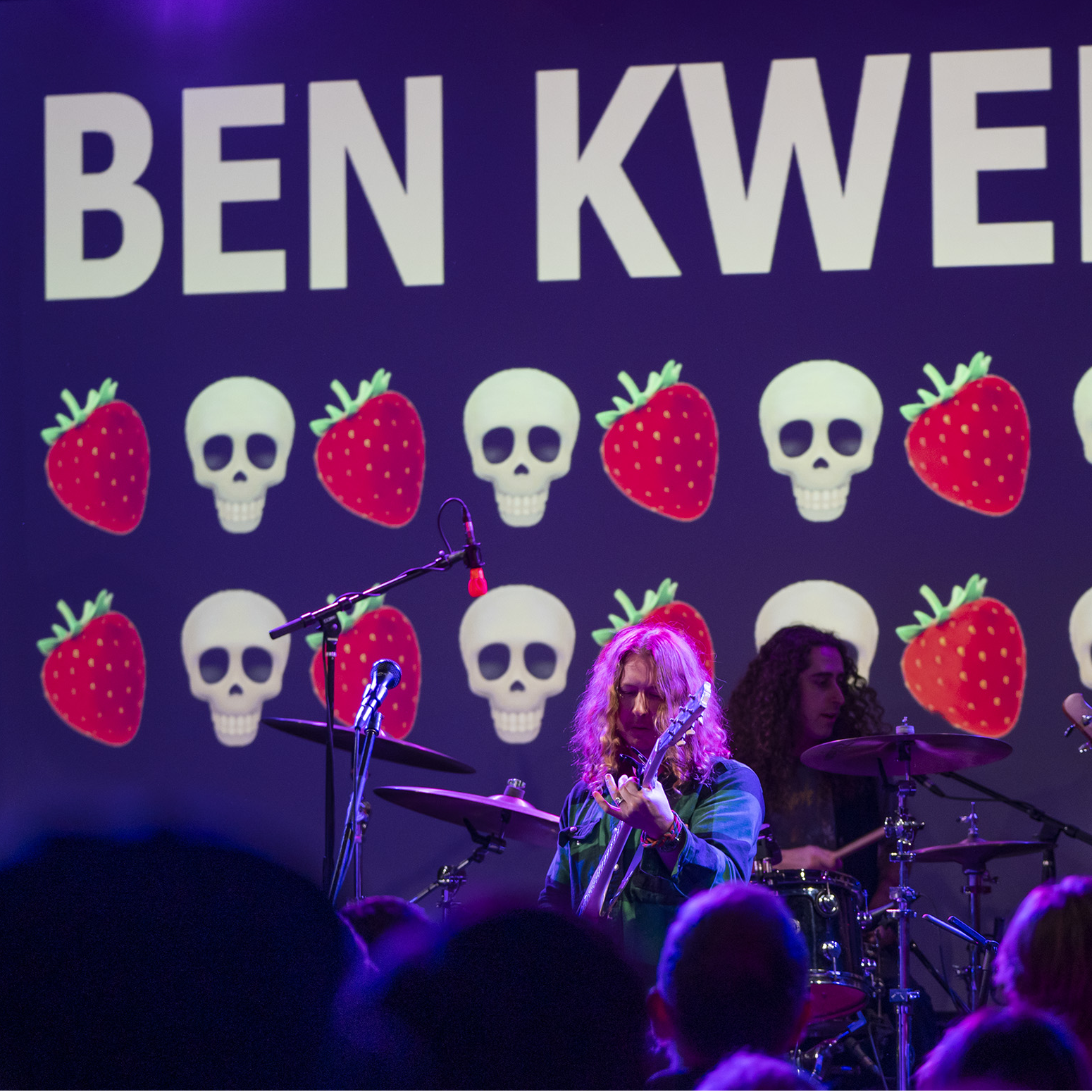
- Kweller performing on tour 2023

Background information
- Also known as: BK
- Born: Benjamin Lev Kweller; June 16, 1981 (age 45); San Francisco, California
- Origin: Greenville, Texas
- Genres: Indie rock, indie folk, country rock, power pop
- Occupations: Singer-songwriter, recording artist, record producer
- Instruments: Vocals, guitar, bass, piano, harmonica, drums
- Years active: 1993–present
- Labels: ATO, RCA, Practice Amp, Noise Company, 679, MapleMusic Recordings (Canada)
- Formerly of: Radish, The Bens
- Website: benkweller.com

Benjamin Lev Kweller (born June 16, 1981) is an American singer, songwriter, and multi-instrumentalist.

A former member of Radish, Kweller has released seven solo albums and appeared on several collaborations.

== Early life ==
Ben Kweller was born in San Francisco in 1981. In 1982, his family relocated to Emory, Texas, where his father, Howard Kweller, became the town's first doctor. In 1986, the Kwellers moved to the larger Texas town of Greenville.

Kweller was exposed to music at a very early age. Howard taught Ben how to play the drums when he was seven years old. For the next year, they would play together almost every night after Howard got home from work. Howard sang and played guitar, while Ben played the drums. The duo played songs by The Beatles, The Hollies, Jimi Hendrix, and other artists of the 1960s. Howard is also a longtime friend of Nils Lofgren, a neighbor of his. Kweller has mentioned in interviews that meeting Lofgren greatly helped his exposure to music. When Kweller turned eight, someone showed him how to play "Heart and Soul" on the piano, and the youngster immediately began to create his own songs using the same chords. By the time he was nine, he had a dozen original compositions under his belt and had entered a songwriting contest sponsored by Billboard magazine, where he won an honorable mention.

== Radish (1993–1999) ==
In 1993, Kweller became friends with a local musician, drummer John Kent, and formed the band Radish with bassist Ryan Green. The trio played locally in and around Greenville and recorded two independent releases, Hello (1994) and Dizzy (1995), with Martin Baird at Verge Music Works recording studio in Dallas, Texas. Around the time of the release of Dizzy, Green left Radish to focus his attention on school. Lauren Hamilton stood in for Green for a few months until Bryan Bradford, also known as Bryan Blur, joined on for most of the band's career.

Kweller sent a copy of Dizzy to guitarist Nils Lofgren, who grew up with Kweller's father in Maryland. Lofgren was impressed with Radish and recommended them to Roger Greenawalt, who was producing Lofgren's album Damaged Goods at the time. Greenawalt took Radish to a studio to record a demo tape, which was subsequently sent to record labels nationwide. After an unexpected bidding war for Dizzy, Radish signed to Mercury Records to release the full-length Restraining Bolt.

Radish made appearances on The Weird Al Show, Late Night with Conan O'Brien and Late Show with David Letterman, but despite a much-hyped signing, the band failed to strike success. Radish earned a cult following in the United Kingdom with its top-40 hit "Little Pink Stars." The band went on multiple European tours, including opening slots for Faith No More and Main Stage at Reading Festival in 1997. Radish released two singles.

In 1998, Radish became a quartet; it featured Joe Butcher of the Polyphonic Spree and UFOFU on lead guitar and Debbie Williams on bass. Radish went to Muscle Shoals Studio in Alabama to record the follow-up to Restraining Bolt, provisionally titled Discount Fireworks. The band recorded with producer Bryce Goggin (Pavement, The Lemonheads). While mastering Discount Fireworks in New York City, Kweller and Kent met bassist Josh Lattanzi, who would become Radish's fifth and final bass player. As a result of PolyGram's merger with Universal Music Group, the 18-song album was never released, and Radish secured a release from their contract with Mercury Records.

== Solo career ==
At age 19, Kweller moved with his girlfriend, Liz Smith, to New York, where he began his solo career. He played solo acoustic shows and self-released four EPs, comprising some of the unreleased Radish Discount Fireworx recordings and other songs recorded in his apartment on a laptop computer. It was one of these EPs, Freak Out, It's Ben Kweller, that caught the attention of Evan Dando of The Lemonheads. Dando invited Kweller on tour with him. Jeff Tweedy, Juliana Hatfield and Guster also noticed Kweller and took him on tour with them.

=== EP Phone Home and Sha Sha (2002) ===
Kweller performing at Ohio State University

In 2001, Ben Kweller became ATO Records' first worldwide signing and released a 5-track EP entitled EP Phone Home. In March 2002, Sha Sha, Kweller's first solo studio LP, was released. Sha Sha included the radio-friendly and popular single "Wasted & Ready", which reached No. 29 on the Modern Rock Tracks chart. The album featured John Kent on drums and Josh Lattanzi on bass, and showcased a wide variety of sound from quirky pop, to folk, to punk. The album grew in popularity with a grassroots effort based on his website and a promotion group called teamBK, which promoted via word-of-mouth advertising. To support the release of the album and EP, he put together a live band, initially composed of Lattanzi on bass, Fred Eltringham on drums, and Mike Stroud on guitar and keyboards. Towards the end of the Sha Sha album cycle, the four-piece performed on PBS's Austin City Limits.

=== The Bens (2003) ===
In 2003, Kweller toured Australia with Ben Folds and Ben Lee as The Bens. The trio produced an eponymous four-song EP, with each member taking lead vocals on one song, and a final song in which they all contributed vocals. In an interview on October 14, 2006, Ben hinted that The Bens may do another album.

=== Guster collaboration (2003) ===
Late in 2003, Kweller provided lead vocals on the song "I Hope Tomorrow is Like Today" from Guster's album Keep It Together. Kweller and Guster co-wrote the song after a late night jam at Guster's Brooklyn studio. The song is prominently featured in the movie Wedding Crashers.

=== On My Way (2004) ===
Kweller's second LP, On My Way, took a new musical direction. The album, produced by Ethan Johns, was recorded mostly live, with limited overdubs and no use of headphones. After the release of On My Way, Kweller embarked on more touring. On these tours, Kweller played for his largest audiences ever, including a US tour co-headlining with Death Cab for Cutie. By this point, the lineup of his live band had changed to include John Kent on drums and Jason Roberts on guitar and keyboards, after Mike Stroud left to concentrate on his own band Ratatat and Fred Eltringham left to play drums in The Wallflowers.

=== Ben Kweller (2006) ===
In 2006, he recorded his third LP, Ben Kweller with producer Gil Norton. Unlike the previous studio albums, Kweller played all the instruments on this record himself. Kweller continued to tour to support his self-titled album, and expanded his band into a five-piece, which grew to include Dan Horne on bass, Mark Stepro on drums, Jay Barclay on guitar and organ and Jason Roberts on lead guitar. Kweller continued to play guitar and piano on this tour, but it also gave him the opportunity to just sing on certain songs. The Montreal group Sam Roberts Band, and New York based Hymns, opened for Kweller.

His tie-in 'Trio on the Train Track Tour' included a new live band comprising Chris Morrissey on bass, vocals & keyboard and Mark Stepro on drums, vocals, glockenspiel, percussion & "whatever else he feels like" during appearances in the United States. During the Australian leg of the tour, the band was composed of Jay Barclay on guitar, keyboard & vocals, Dan Horne on bass & vocals, and Mark Stepro continuing his previous roles.

=== Changing Horses (2009) ===
Changing Horses is Ben Kweller's fourth official studio album, which was expected for release in September 2008 but was pushed to February 2, 2009, in Europe and February 3, 2009, in the United States through ATO Records. Kweller has described the new album as being more country in style than his previous releases. The album features his rhythm section Chris Morrissey (bass) and Mark Stepro (drums). It also debuts the talents of Ben Kitterman, who played pedal steel guitar and Dobro. On November 23, 2008, the full album was leaked to the Internet. In a statement, ATO Records said the leak was not the final version of the album. The song "Hurtin' You" debuted on Stereogum, and the whole album was made available to stream exclusively on Last.fm.

In April 2009, Ben Kweller appeared at Australian festivals such as Chill City, East Coast Blues & Roots Music Festival and West Coast Blues & Roots Festival.

=== Go Fly a Kite (2012) ===
Kweller's fifth studio album, Go Fly a Kite, was his first release produced solely by his own record label, The Noise Company. In earlier interviews, Kweller had stated that it would be released as early as March or April 2011. However, a conversation with the manager of The Noise Company revealed that it was now set to come out either late January or early February 2012. The delay in release is a result of Kweller's parting ways with his former record label, ATO Records. This was confirmed by Kweller himself, onstage at Stubbs in Austin, Texas, on April 16, 2011. More recently, Kweller posted on his Twitter account that "Kite's" released date will be February 12, 2012. This was followed by a tweet saying that it will be available for pre-order in October. Kweller's album was released a few days earlier than expected on iTunes on February 7, 2012.

=== Circuit Boredom (2021) ===
Ben Kweller's sixth studio album, Circuit Boredom, likely started its production in 2018 and culminated with the album's global release on December 17, 2021.

On June 23, 2018, Kweller announced via his Instagram page that he would be releasing a new album soon.

On January 22, 2019, Kweller announced his return to music after he and his family had a near-death experience after carbon monoxide poisoning during a vacation in New Mexico. The new album, Circuit Boredom, co-produced by Dwight A Baker, was released over the course of a year via multiple singles. Its first single, "Heart Attack Kid", was released on February 8, 2019.

Kweller's music video for Heart Attack Kid, was made in collaboration with Robert Strange of Superorganism and released on February 19, 2019.

Other singles include "Just For Kids", "Only A Day", and "Starz". The official street date for Circuit Boredom was Friday, December 17, 2021, when it was released to all DSP's worldwide. The Noise Company (record label) has said the album is a priority of theirs in 2022, starting with a radio campaign for the single "American Cigarettes" in early 2022. Limited edition vinyl was made available on Kweller's website.

=== Cover the Mirrors (2025) ===
Kweller released his seventh studio album, Cover the Mirrors, on May 30, 2025, via the Noise Company.

== Austin City Limits performances ==
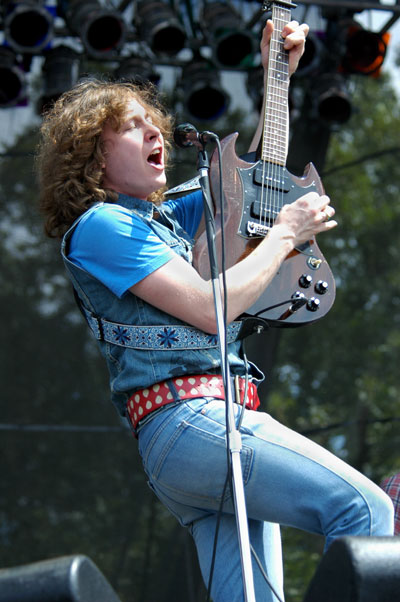
Kweller performing at the 2006 Austin City Limits Music Festival

Kweller played the 2003 Austin City Limits Music Festival at the conclusion of his tour, where he played Sha Sha in its entirety.

He returned to the Austin City Limits in 2004 when he performed on the Bank of America stage.

As part of his 2006 tour, Kweller played the Austin City Limits, where he was plagued by a severe nosebleed for the entirety of his set. After covering his guitar in blood, he attempted to stop the flow by inserting a travel-size tampon thrown onto the stage by a fan, which expanded painfully during a performance of "This Is War". After attempting to play "Falling" at a piano which he also covered in blood, Kweller was forced to end the set early.

In spring of 2007, Kweller co-headlined with his label-mates Gomez. He continued through the summer with his own string of headlining dates which eventually ended at ACL fest. This time, he did not get a bloody nose; however, commemorative T-shirts were sold at the merchandise booth with fake blood stains that said "ACL 2007: The return of Ben Kweller".

Immediately following his performance at ACL, Kweller began recording his fourth full-length LP, a country record titled Changing Horses in Austin, Texas on September 21, 2007.

== Film debut ==
Kweller made his acting debut in William H. Macy's Rudderless; filming began in April 2013.

== Personal life ==
Ben married his longtime love Liz in 2003 (she inspired the song "Lizzy" from 2002's Sha Sha). They had two sons, Dorian and Judah.

On February 28, 2023, it was announced that Kweller's 16-year-old son Dorian had died in a car crash.

== Discography ==
=== Albums ===
- Sha Sha, ver.1 (2000) (Homemade. Feat. Songs from the unreleased Radish album Discount Fireworx. Scarce quantities known)
- Freak Out, It's Ben Kweller, ver. 1 (2001) (Homemade. Black & white artwork. Scarce quantities known.)
- Freak Out, It's Ben Kweller, ver. 2 (2001) (Professional packaging with shrink-wrap, color artwork. Roughly 1,500 known copies)
- Sha Sha, ver. 2 (2002)
- On My Way (2004) No. 83 US
- Ben Kweller (2006) No. 117 US
- Changing Horses (2009) No. 92 US
- Go Fly a Kite (2012) No. 124 US
- Circuit Boredom (2021)
- Cover the Mirrors (2025)

=== EPs ===
- Melange, 1999 (Homemade. Very scarce quantities in circulation)
- Bromeo, 2000 (Homemade. Very scarce quantities in circulation)
- EP Phone Home, 2001 (Limited Edition 2,000)
- BK, 2001 (UK version of EP Phone Home. Different songs. Limited Edition 1,500)
- Sundress, 2006 (Limited Edition 2,500)
- Live and Solo from the Artists Den, 2007 (Exclusive iTunes digital release.)
- How Ya Lookin' Southbound? Come In..., 2008 (Limited Edition 2,500)

=== Singles ===
- "Wasted & Ready", 2002 (No. 29, Billboard Modern Rock Tracks chart)
- "Commerce, TX", 2003
- "Falling", 2003
- "The Rules", 2004
- "Sundress", 2006
- "Penny on the Train Track", 2006
- "Sawdust Man", 2009
- "Jealous Girl", 2012
- "Mean To Me", 2012
- "Heart Attack Kid", 2019
- "Carelesss", 2019
- "Starz", 2020
- "American Cigarettes" (2020)
- "Only A Day" (2020)
- "Optimystic", 2024

=== Other releases ===
- This Is Next Year: A Brooklyn-Based Compilation: Compilation track, 2001
- This Bird Has Flown - A 40th Anniversary Tribute to the Beatles' Rubber Soul: Wait
- Lollipop from Stubbs the Zombie: The Soundtrack, a compilation of covers of 1950 hits.
- Wig in a Box - Songs from and Inspired by "Hedwig and the Angry Inch" (2003) – "Wicked Little Town (Tommy Gnosis version)" with Ben Folds and Ben Lee
- The Bens with Ben Folds and Ben Lee
- Bright Eyes – Four Winds (2007 · Saddle Creek)
- Helio Presents: The Smashing Pumpkins Tribute CD
- The Saturday Sessions: The Dermot O'Leary Show (2007) – "In Other Words"
- "Ciao My Shining Star: The Songs of Mark Mulcahy"(2009) – "Wake Up Whispering"
- "Lightning Runaway"(2009) – "Lightning Runaway" (with The Pillows)

== Awards ==
Independent Music Awards 2013: Go Fly A Kite – Best Rock/Hard Rock Album

== Other sources ==
- 15-year-old Kweller is profiled in the April 7, 1997 issue of The New Yorker.
- Kweller is profiled in chapter 4 of Nobrow, John Seabrook's 2000 study of pop culture, published by Vintage Books
