= Sidewinder (band) =

Australian indie pop group

- Origin: Canberra, Australian Capital Territory, Australia
- Genre: Indie guitar pop
- Years active: 1990–1999
- Label: Half a Cow/Mercury
- Past members: Nick Craft; Martin Craft; Pip Branson; Shane Melder; Giri Fox; Jeremy David

Sidewinder were an Australian indie pop group founded in 1990 in Canberra by Pip Branson on guitar, Martin Craft on bass guitar and backing vocals, his brother Nick Craft on lead guitar and vocals, and Giri Fox on drums. Early in 1994 Shane Melder replaced Fox on drums and in the next year the group relocated to Sydney. Sidewinder were staples of the Australian alternative rock scene in the 1990s and released two studio albums, Atlantis (January 1996) and Tangerine (September 1997). Australian musicologist, Ian McFarlane, described them as "an accessible brand of distortion-drenched, harmony-driven, indie guitar power pop." Sidewinder released two albums and three EPS between 1992 and 1998, all of which were critically acclaimed and received solid Triple J and commercial airplay. These albums ‘traversed a broad sonic terrain, from Beatlesesque psychedelia to eardrum shattering ballsy rock’. Sidewinder were one of the ‘best loved live acts of this decade [1990s]’. had regular spots on festival bills, including the Big Day Out (1994, 1995, and as national touring artists 1996) and played every Homebake from 1996 to 1998 (January, December 1996/ January, December 1998).

They toured extensively with many of their contemporaries, including bands such as Powderfinger, Custard, The Hummingbirds, You Am I, The Clouds, The Fauves, Tumbleweed and Magic Dirt. They also played with other bands, such as Something for Kate, the Dirty Three, the Whitlams, the Underground Lovers and Gaslight Radio. They supported international touring artists, including U2 on the Australian leg of their PopMart Tour in February 1998. They also played with Pavement, the Jesus and Mary Chain, Sebadoh, Superchunk and Red Kross.

They disbanded in 2000.

== History ==
Sidewinder were founded in 1990 in Canberra by Pip Branson on guitar, Martin Craft on bass guitar and backing vocals, his brother Nick Craft on lead guitar and vocals, and Giri Fox on drums. Most of the members were still in secondary school. They played their first live shows in 1991 and in the following year they signed to Half a Cow – a label owned by ex-Canberran musician Nic Dalton (Lemonheads, Plunderers) – which was later purchased by Universal Music. By that time Jeremy David had joined on viola. One of the group's early gigs was at a circus in July 1992.

Dalton compiled a sampler album, Slice Two (November 1992), by various artists on his label, which included an early Sidewinder track, "Last Time". On 12 February 1993 the group issued their debut five-track extended play, T Star – the title refers to "an obscure brand of dodgy runners". The Canberra Times' Steven Corby described their sonation as "grungy guitar pop, a definition Martin agrees with. It's not pop and it's not metal and the experimental move of adding a viola player to their line-up has given their sound a thickness that is its most original factor."

Their second EP, Yoko Icepick, which had four tracks followed on 22 October 1993. Late that year David left and was not replaced. Sidewinder toured with Tumbleweed; The Canberra Times' Rachel Hill found that as a consequence "the songs from Yoko Icepick were being played better live, leaving a gap between what people were hearing on the CD and at gigs." Early in the following year the group appeared at the Big Day Out; soon after Shane Melder (ex-the Hummingbirds) replaced Fox on drums.

The group's third EP, The Gentle Art of Spoonbending, appeared in February 1995, for which Hill felt that they "had moved on to a different type of sound and, with the help of better equipment, were producing a bigger sound." The five tracks were written by the Craft brothers and "display an underlying simplicity not shared by the previous releases." McFarlane opined that it "included two of the band's strongest songs in 'Up to You' and 'Day After Day'." Hill described "Up to You", which "represents Sidewinder's dynamics as a live band, illustrating the sonic power which drives it" while "Day After Day" was "a beautifully written ballad with a Beatlesque feel to it, demonstrating the band's songwriting skills."

The group relocated to Sydney in February 1995. Late that year, the band issued their debut studio album, Atlantis, which McFarlane declared was "brimming with unabashed, infectious rock energy and displayed a great deal of potential." Ahead of its appearance they released a single, "Anything You Want" (October), and then joined Powderfinger and Fur on a national Truckstop tour. Two further singles followed in 1996, "Evil Eye" (January) and "Not Coming Home" (April). Also in January that year they appeared on the Big Day Out tour and followed, during that year, with national tours alongside Custard, Snout and then the Fauves.

While still members of Sidewinder, Martin Craft and Melder formed a side project, Fragile, as a studio-only band with Wayne Connolly on guitar and backing vocals (ex-the Welcome Mat, Knievel) and Simon Holmes on guitar and lead vocals (ex-the Hummingbirds). That group issued an album, Airbrushed Perfection, on Half a Cow/Mercury in March 1996. McFarlane described how it "ran the gamut of sounds from jangly pop ('Dream Come True') to noisy Hüsker Dü-inspired rockers ('She Really Means that Much to Me', 'Resolving Conflict Situations')."

Their second album, Tangerine (September 1997) made many top ten lists for the best album of the year, and is sometimes considered to be one of the finest Australian rock records of the 1990s. It was co-produced by Paul McKercher and the group. Brett Winterford of The Sydney Morning Herald reflected on the album, in January 2008, which "grafted a jangle of distorted guitars with electronic loops and samples, affected vocals and stunning, synth-led soundscapes... Artistically, Tangerine was a window into the future of indie music but commercially it was a flop." Rolling Stone's Kate Crawford felt it provided a "special breed of uplifting pub pop that wins hearts and minds no matter what disasters occur."

The lead single from their second album, "Titanic Days", was released in April 1997: it appeared on the soundtrack for the feature film, Blackrock. A second single, "Here She Comes Again", was issued in August. "Titanic Days" was listed on the Triple J Hottest 100, 1997, with a third single, "God", appearing in February 1998.

Despite their ability to pull crowds throughout Australia, their critical success, good airplay and solid sales figures, Sidewinder were dropped by Universal in 1999 when the label took over Mercury/Polygram.

== Post break-up ==
Martin Craft went on to have a successful solo career under his own name and is currently working as a producer and songwriter. His albums include I Can See It All Tonight (2004), Silver and Fire (2006) and Arrows at the Sun (2008). He also plays as a touring member in Jarvis Cocker's band. Nick Craft formed The Zillions and released the albums Zig-Zag Zillionaire (2005) and Zeuxis: Xight Zeen (2008), as well as music for theatre soundtracks. In 2018, he released his debut solo album, Minerva.

Pip Branson was a touring member of Something for Kate in 2001, and later formed his own band, the Pip Branson Corporation – they released an EP, Hot Dollar (April 2007). He was also a member of Mikelangelo and The Black Sea Gentlemen, under the name Rufino. Shane Melder played with a number of bands, including the Died Pretty, The Hummingbirds and David McCormack from Custard. Melder was a member of The City Lights for their debut album, Escape from Tomorrow (May 2004).

== Discography ==
=== Albums ===
List of albums, with selected details and chart positions
Title	Details	Peak chart positions
Title	Details	AUS
Atlantis	Released: 1995; Label: Half a Cow (hac53); Format: CD	—
Tangerine	Released: September 1997; Label: Half a Cow; Format: CD	76

=== Extended plays ===
List of EPs, with selected details
Title	Details
T Star	Released: 12 February 1993; Label: Half a Cow (hac13); Format: CD
Yoko Icepick	Released: 22 October 1993; Label: Half a Cow (hac24); Format: CD
The Gentle Art of Spoonbending	Released: February 1995; Label: Half a Cow (hac32); Format: CD

=== Singles ===
List of singles, with selected chart positions
Title	Year	Peak chart positions	Album
Title	Year	AUS	Album
"Anything You Want"	1995	—	Atlantis
"Evil Eye"	1996	94	Atlantis
"Not Coming Home"	1996	—	Atlantis
"Titanic Days"	1997	—	Tangerine
"Here She Comes Again"	1997	—	Tangerine
"God"	1998	—	Tangerine
