= The Gadflys =

Australian band

- Origin: Canberra, Australia
- Genres: Roots rock
- Years active: 1982–1985; 1989–2001; 2017–present
- Labels: Phantom; Ravenswood; Larrikin/Festival; Mongrel Jazz
- Spinoff of: The Plunderers
- Members: Mick Moriarity; Phil Moriarity
- Past members: Jonathan Nix; Elmo Reid; Pete Velzen; Nic Dalton; Anthony Hayes; Andy Lewis
- Website: thegadflys.com.au

The Gadflys are an Australian roots rock group, formed by brothers Mick on guitar and vocals and Phil Moriarty on clarinet in Canberra in 1982. Splitting in 1985 they reformed in 1989 as an acoustic group with Andy Lewis joining on double bass. Adding violin to their sound in 1992 the band performed original tunes and issued three studio albums Take Your Medicine (1992), Dimitri's Bungalow (1996) and Out of the Bag (1998). The group spent three years (1997–1999) on Paul McDermott's TV show Good News Week and backed Neil Finn, Steve Harley, Glen Tilbrook, Diesel and Yothu Yindi. Lewis died in February 2000 while they were recording their fourth album Many Happy Returns (November 2000) and they broke up in the following year. In 2017 the group reformed and released their fifth album, Love and Despair (November 2019). They followed with a compilation album in 2022.

== History ==
The Gadflys were formed in October 1982 as a dance-pop group in Canberra by brothers Mick and Philip Moriarty. According to Philip they were named for a gadfly as "being an outsider, and its literary and musical connotations" as well as a hommage to Henry Lawson's contributions to The Gadfly. Prior to the Gadflys, Mick and Philip had been members of Canberra punk bands the Slammers and then Brainiac Five. Their first performance, as the Gadflys, was at Manuka Football Club rooms. They became a punk and 1980s New Wave pop group, which developed a following in Sydney and Canberra by playing originals and dance music cover versions of the Supremes, the Saints and Iggy Pop. In January 1983 the line-up was Geoff Badger on bass guitar, Mick on guitar, Philip on clarinet and Pete Velzen on drums. They released their debut single "Don't Sleep in the Subway" / "(Do the) Apathy" in that year.

The line-up was unsettled due to age restrictions and job opportunities and included Elmo Reid on bass guitar. Late in 1984 the line-up was Mick on guitar and vocals, Phil on clarinet, Velzen on drums as well as Nic Dalton on bass guitar and Anthony Hayes on guitar (latter two from the Plunderers). Dalton, Hayes and Velzen all left to resume the Plunderers while the Gadflys split in 1985. Anthony Hayes, who also performed as Stevie Plunder, died in January 1996. From 1982 to 1985 they incorporated electric clarinet into a basic three-piece electric band line-up. After 1985 Mick and Phil were in Aural Love Gods, which only played cover versions and were self-described as "steaming pot of blues, R&B, country, psychedelia, heavy metal, jazz and pop."

Phil and Mick reformed the Gadflys in December 1989 as an acoustic four-piece with Andy Lewis (ex-the Plunderers) on double bass and Glen James on drums. This second iteration of the Gadflys saw a shift in style from punk to what Phil described as mongrel jazz, "It was kind of because I played clarinet which, unlike saxophone, is not really a rock instrument. We were influenced by bands like the Violent Femmes and the Pogues." Australian musicologist Ian McFarlane observed, "[they] mixed the busking flavour of the Violent Femmes with all manner of American roots music (rockabilly, country, R&B, jazz)." He labelled their overall genre as roots rock. By June 1991 James had left and they continued as a three-piece. Their extended play, The Gadflys, with six tracks was issued in October 1991 via Phantom Records. It was co-produced by the group with Mick Thomas. Most tracks were originals, including "Apathy" and "Catwalk", while they covered the Saints' "All Times Through Paradise".

By November 1992 Lewis had left to join the Whitlams (alongside Plunder and Tim Freedman) and was replaced on double bass by Nathan Nancarrow. The Gadflys released their first studio album, Take Your Medicine (December 1992). Nic Haygarth of The Canberra Times attended its launch, "[they] ease into song like evening into the morning hours, smoothing the smoke and harsh voices almost imperceptibly... making a little seem plenty. Amplification and distortion are left to publicists. No drums: percussion is a double bass."

Early in 1993 Nancarrow was replaced on double bass by Jonathan Nix, who also provided backing vocals. Their second EP, Don't Get Me Wrong, appeared in November 1993. Its four tracks included its title track previously on Take Your Medicine and three new tracks. They toured France, Spain, Belgium, Holland, Germany and appeared at various Edinburgh Festivals in 1994, 1995 and 1996.

== Discography ==
=== Albums ===
==== Studio albums ====
List of studio albums, with Australian chart positions
Title	Details	Peak chart positions
Title	Details	AUS
Take Your Medicine	Released: December 1992; Format: CD, cassette; Label: Phantom (PHCD-21)	—
Dimitri's Bungalow	Released: 1996; Format: CD; Label: Ravenswood (RV1023)	—
Out of the Bag	Released: October 1998; Format: CD; Label: Larrikin (LRF514)	95
Many Happy Returns	Released: November 2000; Format: CD; Label: Mongrel Jazz (333192)	—
Love and Despair	Released: 15 November 2019; Format: CD, digital download, streaming; Label: Mongrel Jazz	—

==== Compilation albums ====
List of compilation albums, with selected details
Title	Details
40rty Years in the Wilderness	Released: 2022; Format: CD, digital download, streaming; Label: Mongrel Jazz

=== Extended plays ===
List of EPs, with selected details
Title	Details
The Gadflys	Released: October 1991; Format: CD, LP; Label: Phantom (PHMCD-10)
Don't Get Me Wrong	Released: November 1993; Format: CD; Label: Phantom (PHMCD-28)
Guru	Released: July 1994; Format: CD; Label: Phantom (PHMCD-38)
