= AME School =

Association of Modern Education School

Location
- Canberra; Australia; 35.33°S 149.06°E

Information
- Opened: 1972
- Closed: 1996
- Head of school: Bernie Perrett
- Years: K–10

The Association of Modern Education School (or AME School) was opened in early 1972 and ran as an independent community based school in Canberra until late 1996.

== History ==
=== Establishment ===
Planning for the foundation of the school began around 1970 and the school took over the disused government school buildings in the Canberra suburb of Duntroon, which had recently closed. The AME school first opened in February 1972 with Robin McConnell as headmaster. The school was a progressively run educational institution, which sought to foster an atmosphere in which kids were encouraged to develop their own particular talents, instead of sticking to a rigid set curriculum. The school enrolled students from Kindergarten to year 10.

Being socially and politically progressive, the school attracted an interesting and eclectic mix of students, many being the children of ANU academics and staff. Australian Senator Susan Ryan and former UN chief weapons inspector and diplomat Richard Butler were amongst the community of parents. Parent participation in the school curriculum was encouraged, strengthening strong ties and friendships between the school and families. Kids called teachers by their first names, which was unusual for the time at government schools in the ACT. The school was featured in the book Good Australian Schools and Their Communities, published in 1973. The AME school also pioneered the teaching of the Japanese language in ACT schools, with the employment of Saeko Ogi as Japanese teacher in 1973.

In 1974, Bernie Perrett took over as headmaster and remained at the school until early 1994. 1974 also marked the start of the long step to develop the school on a new site at Weston. During early 1978, the school moved from Duntroon to more permanent newly purpose-built school buildings in the Canberra suburb of Weston. Facilities at the new school were improved over those in Duntroon. The new school buildings were also largely constructed of wood to give the design and structure of the new school an organic feel. Some AME students were involved in Canberra's punk music and alternative arts scenes.

During 1988, AME School librarian, Ann Furnass, edited a book in 1988 covering the history of the school, "The AME School An Historical Record". Former teacher Steve Shann also published the book "AME School: School Portrait" in 1987.

In 1992, there was a proposal to fully integrate the AME school with the ACT Government school system. However the idea floundered after the ACT Teachers Union amongst other things, knocked the idea on the head, due to compatibility issues. It felt the idea of having a school principal having selection over teaching staff was outside the scope of the Unions control. It came out fighting against the proposal.

=== Closure ===
From 1994, the AME principal was Judith Norris. 1994 was to be a difficult year for AME financially but a short term grant from the ACT Government, staved off disaster. By the end of 1995, Judith Norris had moved on. The school council then appointed Kevin Nicholson, as the new AME school principal. Formerly of Bacchus Marsh Grammar, the appointment of Nicholson was designed to complete the restructuring that the AME school had been going through.

The AME School had continued to run and teach students successfully but around this time, the school had also started to come under pressure with the level of its enrolment numbers. As a consequence, AME as a functioning school, was forced to close its doors during late 1996. The school buildings were then sold to the nearby Orana School, a Rudolf Steiner school, to pay off debts including the AME schools bank overdraft.

== Subsequent developments ==
In early 2003, the Canberra bushfires narrowly missed destroying the former buildings of the school, as the nearby Stromlo pine forests were decimated by fire. The area has also faced a number of other challenges, including nearby land development by the ACT Government, which has occurred progressively, since the early 1990s.

During 2010, a group of former AME teachers and students decided to set up an ambitious project to try to bring all the former students, teachers and parents, back together again. The reunion ended up taking place at the former AME site at Weston, on Sunday 18 November 2012. This featured events, displays and history of the AME school. This was attended by many former teachers, parents and students of the school from Australia and overseas. This marked the 40th anniversary of the original concept of the school and its philosophy. There are plans possibly, to hold more such events in Canberra, in the future.

== Notable alumni ==
- Andrew Barr – MLA, ACT Minister for Education and Training, Tourism, Sport and Recreation, Industrial Relations, Planning. Chief Minister of the A.C.T. (2014 onwards)
- Kate Buchdahl – classical violinist
- Steve Dargavel – former MP, local member for electorate of Fraser (1997–1998); currently Acting AMWU Victorian Secretary
- Deej Fabyc – contemporary artist known for her performance and installation work
- First Dog on the Moon – also known as Andrew Marlton, cartoonist for Crikey.com; former contributor to ABC Radio
- Simon Holmes – former lead singer and guitarist with Australian rock band, The Hummingbirds
