= Molly Contogeorge =

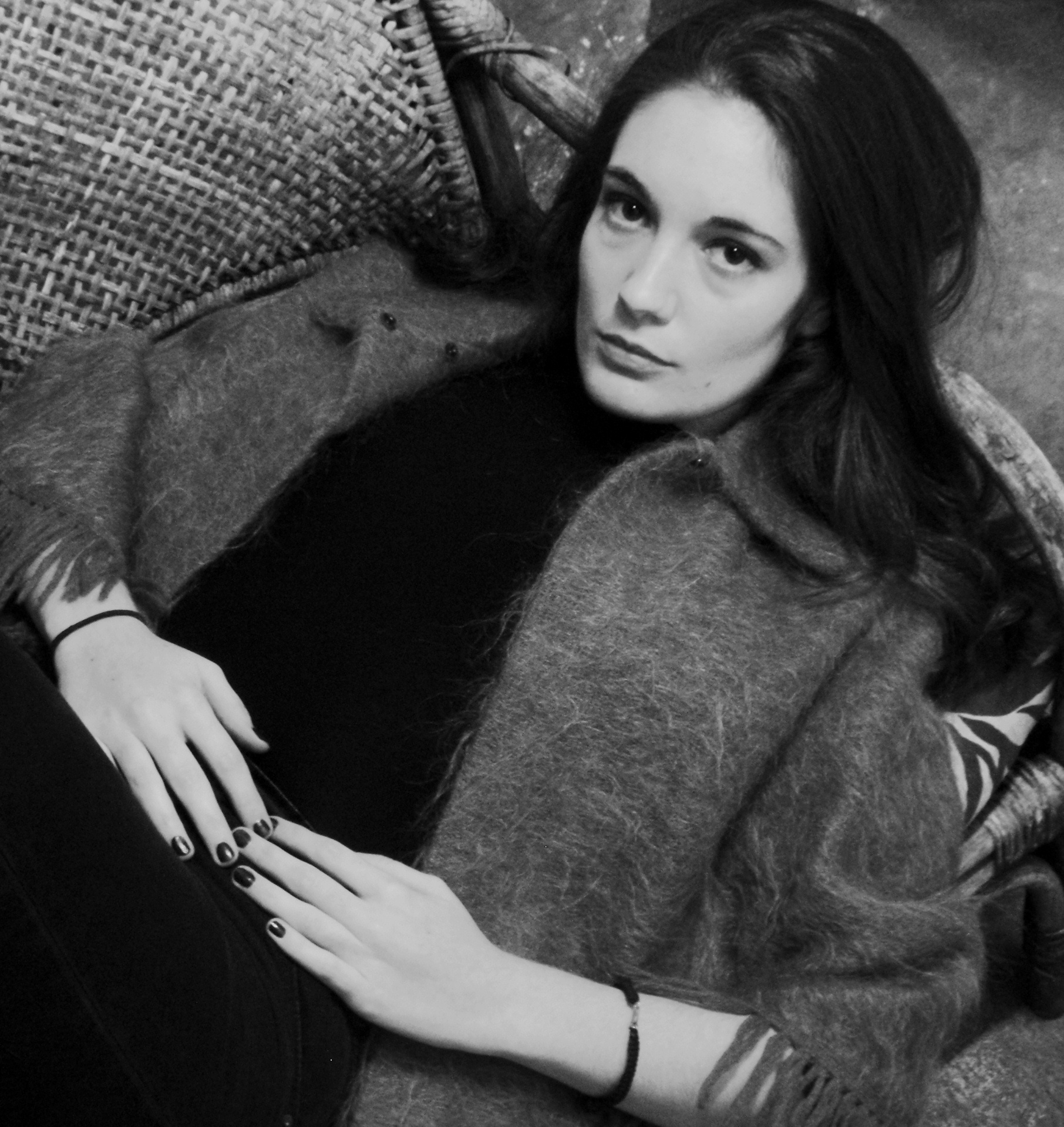
- Molly Contogeorge, 2012.

Background information
- Born: Molly Anastasia Contogeorge; 1990 (age 35–36)
- Origin: Sydney, New South Wales, Australia
- Genres: Indie pop
- Occupations: Singer-songwriter, musician
- Instruments: Vocals, keyboards, piano
- Years active: 2008–present
- Label: Independent
- Website: facebook.com/mollycontogeorgemusic

Molly Anastasia Contogeorge (born 1990) is an Australian indie pop singer-songwriter and keyboardist. She has performed both locally and internationally with appearances at South by South West, CMJ, Romerías de Mayo World Festival of Arts in Holguín, Cuba, Peats Ridge Festival, Surry Hills Music Festival, Newtown Music Festival, The 28 Black Crown Street Crawl, The Wonder 100! fête, Conception Day Music Festival, Bitter and Twisted Festival and the Cruelty Free Festival. Contogeorge has issued two extended plays, Cause and Effect (2008) Glasshouse Living (2011) with a third (title unknown) due for release on Thursday 27 June 2013.

== Biography ==
Molly Anastasia Contogeorge, (known to her inner circle as MAC) was born in 1990, both her father, Leon Contogeorge (died 15 December 2008), and her mother, Catherine (née McSoriley, born in New Zealand and whose mother was also named Molly), were musicians who also taught music. Her paternal grandfather, Paul Contogeorge, established a guitar teaching business in the early 1960s, which Leon and Catherine subsequently took over. Contogeorge grew up in a musical household in the Sydney suburb of Coogee. At nine-years-old her favourite music was Aqua's "Barbie Girl", The Beatles' "Helter Skelter" and Angelo Badalamenti's theme for the TV series, Twin Peaks ("Falling"). Contogeorge wrote and recorded her first song at the age of ten. In 2007 she completed her Higher School Certificate (final year of secondary education) at Randwick Girls' High School where she was listed as a Distinguished Achiever (top 90%) in English Extension 1 and Music 1. She made her professional performance debut in 2008 at the age of seventeen.

Contogeorge was one of three in-house songwriters for Underscore Production Music, which was headed by composer, Ric Mills. In 2008 her debut extended play, Cause and Effect, was issued as a promotional recording and was distributed freely to the public both online and via live performances. It was recorded at Electric Avenue Studios, Sydney and Panoramix Studios, Byron Bay. Due to this release, her music reached thousands of people worldwide and attracted the attention of music industry executives in Australia and the United Kingdom. In November 2008 she appeared on a bill with United States singer-songwriter Shelley Harland and Australian indie folk duo, Ruby for Lucy. In March 2009 she "performed unofficial showcases in Austin" at the South by South West festival.

Contogeorge in Holguín, Cuba during Romerías de Mayo, May 2011.

Contogeorge has performed with The Potbelleez, Bertie Blackman, New Empire, Microwave Jenny, Matt McHugh, Ainslie Wills, Ash Grunwald, RüFüS, The Khanz, Lowrider and 1927. She's participated in such music festivals as SxSW, CMJ, Romerías de Mayo, Peats Ridge Festival, Surry Hills Music Festival, Newtown festival, the Conception Day Music Festival at Macquarie University, The Bitter and Twisted festival, The 28 Black Crown Street Crawl charity fundraiser, The Wonder 100! fête fundraiser and the Cruelty Free Festival (October 2011). In 2010 she won the National Youth Week' National Talent Industry Award in the RockIt Senior category presented by Marcia Hines for her track, "Lead on, Lead On". In June that year, she launched a regional tour of New South Wales and Victoria with an initial gig at The Vanguard with a backing band, and was supported at that performance by The MoPhones and Pete Sot. Since 2004 Contogeorge has garnered nominations in various National Youth Week competitions, Musicoz Awards, and Australian Songwriters Association National Songwriting competition. In May 2011 she performed at the Romerías de Mayo (English: May pilgrimages), World Festival of Arts in Holguín, Cuba. She was advertised as "one of the most important young voices in [her] country" and was accompanied by McSoriley, who is also her manager.

In May 2011 Sydney-based author, Amanda Cole, issued Who Needs Prince Charming?, a self-realisation book for women, which collated contributions from 35 Australian women including Contogeorge, Bianca Dye, Camilla Franks, Kathryn Eisman, Tania Zaetta, and Cindy Pan. On 14 October 2011 Contogeorge released her second EP, Glasshouse Living. She started writing tracks for the EP in mid-2009 some time after the death of her father.

On Monday 17 June (2013) Contogeorge made the announcement through her Facebook page that she'd be releasing a new EP (title unknown) on Thursday 27 June.

== Discography ==
=== Extended plays ===
- Cause and Effect (August 2008)
- Glasshouse Living (14 October 2011)
- Dames (27 June 2013)

== Notes ==
- Casey, Liam, (February 2008), "Young and Restless: The Journey to SxSW", The Drum Media, Sydney: Street Press Australia.
- Casey Liam, (April 2008), "Young and Restless: The follow up from SxSW", The Drum Media, Sydney: Street Press Australia.
- "Molly Contogeorge", (June 2010), Forte Magazine, Ballarat.
