= Turnstyle Country =

Studio album by Turnstyle
- Released: October 7, 1999
- Recorded: Revolver Sound Studio, Hampton Senior High School, Home recorded
- Genre: Indie rock
- Length: 47:21
- Label: Spunk! URA-016
- Producer: Laurie Sinagra, Turnstyle

Turnstyle chronology
| Seasides EP (1997) | Turnstyle Country (1999) | Geek Party (2000) |

Turnstyle Country is the debut album by Australian indie rock band Turnstyle.

== Background ==
The album was practically completed before the band signed to Spunk Records who offered to promote the single "Spray Water On The Stereo" to test the band's viability on a national scale. The single was a success, reaching 16 on the Aria Alternative Charts and the band subsequently signed on the proviso that they be allowed to release all 16 recorded songs. Distributor Festival Records were encouraging an EP release but as drummer Dean Davies pointed out in a fan interview, "We called it Country because it has so many different styles on it and that could only work on a full length album". The album was heavily influenced by the similarly sprawling Wowee Zowee album by Pavement.

== Track listing ==
1. "Flank Attack" – 4:02
2. "Spray Water on the Stereo" – 2:35
3. "Manhattan" – 2:12
4. "Winter Rodeo" – 4:16
5. "Studying the Stars" – 3:28
6. "Do You Know?" – 1:37
7. "Knuckles" – 2:07
8. "Honey" – 2:55
9. "Jack It and Stick" – 5:00
10. "Portamento" – 2:49
11. "Good Sense" – 2:18
12. "Troma" – 2:49
13. "Purple Crown" – 3:34
14. "Cosmopolitan" – 1:22
15. "Gregory's Girl" – 1:37
16. "Scrabble" – 4:42

== Samples ==
- "Winter Rodeo"
  - Samples the Hammer Horror film Twins of Evil
- "Do You Know"
  - Samples "OLV 26" performed by Stereolab
- "Cosmopolitan"
  - Samples the Hong Kong martial arts film The Young Master
- "Scrabble"
  - Samples "Hi-Fi Sound Stereo Test Record"

== Personnel ==
Band members

- Adem Kerimofski – lead and backing vocals; bass, acoustic and electric guitars; keyboards; drums, percussion
- Paul Fanning – lead and backing vocals; bass, electric guitars; keyboards; percussion
- Todd Griffiths – lead vocals on "Good Sense"; backing vocals; electric guitars; keyboards; percussion
- Dean Davies - lead vocals on "Do You Know?"; backing vocals; electric guitars; keyboards; drums, percussion

Additional personnel

- Laurie Sinagra – producer, sound engineer, mixing
- William Bowden - mastering
