= The Last Unicorn (EP) =

The Last Unicorn is a song featured as a part of two full albums (HAC30) as well as an extended play [EP] single (HAC39) between 1994 and 1995 as released by the Australian band Swirl via the record label Half A Cow. The EP contains two cover songs - Nick Cave's "The Ship Song" and Klaatu's "Calling Occupants".

== The Last Unicorn Album (1994) ==
1. Strangelands
2. Dark Star
3. II Eternity
4. Yesterday Blue
5. Hyperon Crash
6. Tailor’s Eye
7. Chains
8. Night of the Unicorn
9. Nice Passage
10. The Last Unicorn
11. Going Home
12. Poppel Grave

== The Last Unicorn EP (1995) ==
1. The Last Unicorn
2. The Goodbye Soldier
3. The Ship Song (Cover of a Nick Cave song)
4. Calling Occupants (Cover of The Carpenters song)

== The Last Unicorn album Re-release (1995) ==
1. Strangelands (4:16)
2. Dark Star (6:12)
3. II Eternity (2:07)
4. Yesterday Blue (3:03)
5. Hyperon Crash (7:23)
6. Tailor's Eye (4:44)
7. Chains (5:34)
8. Night Of The Unicorn (4:11)
9. Ice Passage (1:38)
10. The Last Unicorn (4:32)
11. Going Home (4:18)
12. Poppel Grave (3:00)
