= Exserts =

Australian punk rock band

- Origin: Sydney, New South Wales, Australia
- Genres: Punk rock
- Years active: 1980–1987
- Labels: Aberrant
- Past members: Steven Demsey; Charlie Sammut; Greg Suptut; Simon Holmes; Andrew Thomas

Exserts were an Australian three-piece punk rock band, which formed in 1980 with Steven Demsey on bass guitar, Charlie Sammut on drums and Greg Suptut on guitar and vocals. Suptut was replaced by Simon Holmes in 1981, who was replaced in turn by Andrew Thomas on vocals and guitar in May 1983. They released a self-titled album via Aberrant Records in February 1987 before disbanding shortly after.

== History ==
Exserts members began in Sydney in 1980 with school mates: Steve Demsey on bass guitar, Charles Sammut on drums and Greg Suptut on guitar and vocals. Their first show was in 1981, playing punk covers and a few originals, at the Sussex Hotel, Sydney – they made A$3 after expenses. Simon Holmes replaced Suptut in late 1981 on guitar and vocals. He was replaced in turn by Andrew Thomas in May 1983 – Holmes became a founding member of indie pop group, the Hummingbirds in 1986.

The line-up of Demsey, Sammut and Thomas provided three tracks, "Business Man", "Countdown" and "Stranglehold", on Aberrant Records' 1984 Sydney punk compilation, Not So Humdrum, assembled by Bruce Griffith. Steve Gardner of Noise for Heroes, observed, "the Exserts get a much better sound on these cuts than on their own lp." According to Australian musicologist, Ian McFarlane, "[they] continued playing the local pub network without scoring interest further afield."

They released one studio album, Exserts, via Aberrant Records on 9 February 1987 but broke up soon after. Gardner was disappointed with the album, "I had high hopes for this lp. Unfortunately, the mix seems to have flattened out some of its spunk so that although it's fast, it doesn't have the edges of the humdrum stuff. On this record the drums are really good and the guitar could be mixed louder." He found that they were, "[a] hardcore band dealing primarily in political lyrics... The songs are not real long on hooks, tending to stick with fairly simple guitar chording, but the pace is always a good hardcore tempo without descending into out-of-control thrash."

Post breakup, Charlie Sammut went on to drum with Sydney outfit ' Bits of Kids' while Andrew Thomas played with 'The Latenotes' and 'The Herman Jasper Situation'. He and Steven Demsey then moved into other endeavours outside of music.

== Members ==
- Steven Demsey – bass guitar (1980–87)
- Charlie Sammut – drums (1980–87)
- Greg Suptut – lead guitar, vocals (1980–81)
- Simon Holmes – lead guitar, vocals (1981–83)
- Andrew Thomas – lead guitar, vocals (1983–87)

== Discography ==
- "Business Man", "Countdown", "Stranglehold" (on Various Artists' compilation album, Not So Humdrum), (1984) – Aberrant Records (NUMBA-2)
- Exserts (1987) – Aberrant Records (ZERT-1)
