= Anthony Hayes =

Anthony Hayes may refer to:

- Anthony Hayes (actor) (born 1977), Australian actor
- Stevie Plunder (1963–1996), born Anthony Hayes, Australian guitarist, singer and songwriter
