= Simon Holmes (guitarist) =

- Born: Simon Carter Holmes; 28 March 1963; Mordialloc, Victoria, Australia
- Origin: Sydney, New South Wales, Australia
- Died: 13 July 2017 (aged 54) Sydney, New South Wales, Australia
- Genres: Punk rock; indie pop; pop rock
- Occupations: Singer-songwriter; producer
- Instruments: Vocals; guitar; bass; organ; melodica
- Years active: 1982–2017
- Labels: Phantom; rooArt
- Formerly of: Exserts; Bug Eyed Monsters; The Hummingbirds; Revhead; Coloursound; Fragile; Her Name in Lights

Simon Carter Holmes (28 March 1963 – 13 July 2017) was an Australian musician who served as the singer and lead guitarist for the indie rock bands, The Hummingbirds (1986–93) and Her Name in Lights (2003–05).

== Biography ==
Simon Holmes was born on 28 March 1963 at Mordialloc Hospital to Neville and Eve Holmes. He grew up with an elder sister, Kerith, and a younger brother, Rowan. The family lived in Bentleigh, before shifting to Turramurra in 1967, before going overseas for three years, in upstate New York, where Holmes started school at Myers Corner. The family then moved to Geneva, Switzerland. He spent part of his childhood in Canberra, attending the AME School: an alternative education institution and then Hawker College. Holmes moved to Sydney in the early 1980s. He started studying anthropology and archaeology at the University of Sydney, but left after two years.

For a family history published in 2007 Simon wrote about how he got into music: "We were up in Queensland for a family holiday and the moment I heard Paul McCartney go: 1,2,3,4 it was all over for me: family, friends and art are what matters. Everything that's happened in my professional life since then stems from that moment. All that I've ever known is rock and roll and retail which would explain why I find myself as a second hand record dealer. I like to listen to, sell, read about, make, and help other people make music. I am playing in four or five musical outfits concurrently: Bondi covers band 'the Shark Alarms'; acoustic duo 'Four and a half sticks'; dormant attack rock outfit 'Fragile'; and sensitive pop band 'Her name in lights'."

In 1981 Holmes, on guitar and vocals, replaced founding member Greg Suptut in Sydney-based punk rockers, the Exserts, until May 1983. His musical influences include punk rock, psychedelia and new wave. During the mid-1980s Holmes was a member of Bug Eyed Monsters, alongside John Boyce on bass guitar and Mark Temple on drums. In 1986 the trio formed the Hummingbirds, as a pop group. Holmes described their name, "I don't particularly like but it stuck. We were in a hurry when we recorded our first single and it was innocuous enough for all of us. But it's an appropriate name — it's light and inoffensive and relatively memorable." Soon after they were joined by Alannah Russack on guitar.

Early in 1987 Robyn St Clare replaced Boyce on bass guitar and vocals. The Hummingbirds' debut single, "Alimony" (July 1987), was written by Holmes. As of August 1989 Holmes was working in a record store (which was also his group's label), Phantom Records, while St Clare worked in a book shop and a coffee shop. Holmes and St Clare became domestic partners and, in 1991, they had a child.

The group's debut album, loveBUZZ (October 1989) via rooArt, peaked at No. 31 on the ARIA Albums Chart. The Canberra Times' Kathryn Whitfield observed "he likes his music loud enough to rattle his bones and vibrate his internal organs, and judging by the somewhat speedy success of the band's debut album, loveBUZZ, there are a lot of other folk who enjoy the same experience." Most of its 14 tracks were written by Holmes, although its lead single, "Blush" (August 1989), was co-written with St Clare. It became their highest charting single when it reached No. 19. The group issued a second album, Va Va Voom (April 1991), and disbanded in December 1993.

During 1992, while still with the Hummingbirds he issued a single, "Strung Out", under the name, Revhead. In the 1990s Holmes helped run an alternative culture bookshop, Half A Cow, in Glebe and he also worked as a music retailer. As a record producer he worked on Custard's second album, Wahooti Fandango (July 1994), the Fauves' second album, The Young Need Discipline (November 1994, co-produced with Wayne Connolly) and Things of Stone and Wood's fourth album, Whirligig (September 1996, co-produced with Things of Stone and Wood, James Black). Holmes released an album, Airbrushed Perfection and two mini-albums with his band Fragile, between 1995 and 2000.

By October 2004 he was a member of Her Name in Lights, which issued their debut album, Into the Light Again, on Laughing Outlaw Records. Holmes provided bass guitar, lead guitar, and pump organ; and also produced the album.

Holmes died in Sydney in July 2017, at the age of 54. Cause of death was not publicly announced.
