= Swirl (band) =

- Origin: Sydney, New South Wales, Australia
- Genres: Indie guitar pop; indie rock
- Years active: 1991–2002
- Labels: Half a Cow; Half a Cow/Mercury; Regular; Festival; Polydor; Um & Ah
- Past members: Ben Aylward; David Lord; Nicola Schultz; Richard Anderson; Keira Hodgkison
- Website: swirl.com.au

Swirl were an Australia indie rock band, forming in 1991 by Ben Aylward on guitar and vocals, David Lord on drums and Nicola Schultz on bass guitar and vocals. Schultz left in 1997 and was replaced by Richard Anderson on bass guitar and keyboards and Keira Hodgkison on guitar and vocals. They released three albums, Aurora (May 1992), The Last Unicorn (May 1994) and Light Fill My Room (July 2001), before breaking up in December 2002.

== History ==
Swirl formed in Sydney in early 1991 as an indie guitar pop trio by Ben Aylward on guitar and vocals, David Lord on drums and Nicola Schultz on bass guitar and vocals. Australian musicologist, Ian McFarlane, described them as, "[a] very prolific outfit, [their] brand of UK-inspired, noisy guitar pop stamped the band as a popular drawcard on the alternative scene." They recorded their first extended play, Swirl (December 1991), with two of its four tracks at Moonlight Studios (January to February) and the other two at Powerhouse Studios (March to May), Sydney.

Their debut album, Aurora (May 1992), was produced by label owner, Nic Dalton. It included some shoegazer elements, such as extensive use of guitar fuzz and reverb on vocals. Their second album, The Last Unicorn, appeared in May 1994. Nicole Leedham of The Canberra Times rated it at eight-out-of-ten and explained, "[it] is a simple disc, a welcome relief from most of the over-produced pap that dominates much of the airwaves these days." McFarlane opined, "[the tracks] ranged from soft, jangly moments ('Strangelands') to bursts of sonic guitar squalls ('Dark Star', 'The Last Unicorn')." It went further into shoegazing territory, with layered, feedback-washed guitar solos and ambient instrumental tracks between songs; it also featured guest performances by Lara Goodridge, later of the FourPlay String Quartet on violin and Sarah Peet on cello.

In subsequent years Swirl released a few EPs and played live in Sydney, Melbourne and other Australian cities. They supported gigs by My Bloody Valentine and Ride on their respective tours of Australia. Schultz left in 1997 and was replaced by Richard Anderson on bass guitar and keyboards and Keira Hodgkison on guitar and vocals. In April 1999 the new line-up issued a single, "Time", which Jasper Lee of Oz Music Project observed was, "one of the most uniquely brilliant singles of [that year]" where they have "remodelled themselves stylistically and musically."

During the year 2000, Hodgkison relocated to Melbourne to start at the Victorian College of the Arts, where she studied composition, however the group continued performing upon her periodic returns to Sydney. Swirl's last studio album, Light Fill My Room, was released in July 2001 on independent record label, Um & Ah; it had been recorded a few years earlier and was financed by Festival Mushroom Records, although that label dropped them and so its release was held up. Aylward described their moving labels, "we were with Half a Cow for about seven years and it just got to the point where Roger Grierson wanted to sign us to Festival records, and we just thought it was the next step." He explained the delay in releasing the album, "We just went through a lot of typical story record company stuff. We recorded this record about two years ago."

Lee's associate at Oz Music Project, Michelle Ho felt, "[they] have managed to develop their unique sound into something a little more solid, whilst maintaining their fairytale-like pop melodies and beautiful guitar riffs." She observed how their, "delicate melodies will send your body into shivers of utter bliss, and Ben and Keira's vocals are sublimely harmonious to the ears. Like an inspirational emotional roller coaster, it takes you up, down, around and back." Light Fill My Room was a more polished, radio-friendly affair; it had elements of Swirl's shoegazing sound, but also ballads and even a children's choir on one track. Swirl broke up in December 2002 as the members pursued other musical projects.

== Post break up ==
In 2010 Swirl released a digital double album of EP, b-sides and live tracks, Satellites (One) and Satellites (Two). These were available via download through iTunes. The original Swirl line-up reunited in 2012 to play at Half a Cow Records tribute nights at the Lansdowne Hotel, Sydney in December of that year and the Tote in Collingwood in January of the following year.

== Members ==
- Ben Aylward – guitar, vocals (1991–2002)
- Nicola Schultz – bass guitar, vocals (1991–97)
- David Lord – drums, percussion (1991–2002)
- Keira Hodgkison – guitar, vocals (1997–2002)
- Richard Anderson – bass guitar, keyboards (1997–2002)

== Discography ==
=== Studio albums ===
- Aurora (February 1992) – Half a Cow (HAC CD 06)
- The Last Unicorn (May 1994) – Half a Cow/Regular Records/Festival Records) (HAC 30, D 31161)
  - The Last Unicorn (1995) – Half a Cow/Polydor Records) (re-release, which has different track order)
- Light Fill My Room (July 2001) – Um & Ah

=== Extended plays ===
- Swirl (December 1991) – Half a Cow (HAC 03)
- Touch (May 1993) – Half a Cow/Regular Records/Festival Records)
- The Last Unicorn (July 1995) – Half a Cow/Mercury Records)
- On My Own (November 1996) – Half a Cow/Mercury Records)

=== Singles ===
- "Tears" (October 1992)
- "Fade Away" (US-only, 1993)
- "Strange Lands" (1994) Half a Cow/Dirt Records (DRT-005)
- "Time" (April 1999) Festival Records
- "Gypsy Eyes" (October 1999)

=== Other appearances ===
- Half a Cow "Compilation" (1993, HAC28)
- North Core Vol 1 (August 1997) Pr1stine Rekids 'n' Stuff (PCD 001) – Tailor's Eye
- Satellites (One) (2010, Half a Cow)
- Satellites (Two) (2010, Half a Cow)
