= Half a Cow =

Australian independent record label

Half A Cow Records
- Founded: 1990
- Founder: Nic Dalton; Miles Ferguson
- Distributors: MGM Distribution; Rocket Exports
- Genre: Various
- Country of origin: Australia
- Location: Strawberry Hills, New South Wales
- Official website: Half A Cow Records

Half A Cow is an independent record label from Australia, established in 1990 by Sydney musician and music identity Nic Dalton.

== History ==
In 1985 - 1989, Dalton ran a bookshop (owned by Dalton's parents) in the Sydney suburb of Glebe called Dalton's Books. In late 1989, Dalton and his friend Miles Ferguson, took over the store, renamed it Half A Cow and started stocking more comics, records and tee-shirts than the 'beat' books they had been concentrating on. At the same time, they started Half A Cow Records and started working on the label's first release, Billiepeebup (hac01, released October 1990) - a 4-track recorded album of songs made between 1985 and 1989 by the Love Positions, a duo of Dalton and his then girlfriend, Robyn St Clare from The Hummingbirds. That wPleasure (cow01) by the [1990.

In 1991, Half A Cow released the single Don't Want To Be Grant McLennan by Smudge (about Go-Betweens co-founder Grant McLennan), which was an indie hit, and single of the week in music magazine NME

In late 1991, Evan Dando asked Dalton to temporarily join The Lemonheads. An offer he initially turned down, but as Dando pointed out that it would make his label known worldwide, and with persuasion from friends he did indeed join, and as expected in 1992 it gave a huge boost for Half a Cow. Before he left Half A Cow assistant, Dave Chatfield, was appointed to run the label, along with Robyn St Clare. In 1992 the label also signed a deal with Festival Records to distribute the label. In 1994 the label switched distributor to Mercury Records, which was followed by a change in 1998 back to Festival Records. In early 2000 Half A Cow ended its relationship with Festival Records and now the label is completely independent and distributed through MGM Distribution. Chatfield moved to Melbourne to pursue touring with Spunk and the label is solely managed by Dalton.

Since its establishment in 1990, Half A Cow has put out over two hundred and fifty releases by a long line of bands and solo acts, including work by Dalton and bands he has been in (such as Sneeze, Godstar, a re-issue of The Plunderers' Banana Smoothie, Honey, and Nic Dalton and his Gloomchasers), who dissolved in November 2019. As of May 2006, the label is based back in Sydney (after six years in NSW's central west and a year in Digger's Rest, Victoria) where it continues to release contemporary Australian music as well as a series of re-issues by bands from the 1960s (like Pip Proud, The Missing Links, The Purple Hearts and the Wild Cherries). The label took a break from releasing any new recordings between 2012 and 2014 but returned in 2015 with a new album from Bernie Hayes. 2016 saw the reissue of two mid 2000s albums by Perth band The Burton Cool Suit and more recently the label has released new music featuring Dalton's collaboration with Adem K from Turnstyle.

== Documentary ==
Melbourne filmmaker Jarrad Kennedy is completing a documentary about Nic Dalton, covering his work as a musician and label boss for Half A Cow.

If It's Catchy will be released in 2016 with Part II to follow in 2018.

== Past and present roster ==
- 2 Litre Dolby
- Agnes Kain
- Art of Fighting
- Bernie Hayes
- Blooming Heck
- Booster Valves
- Bruce
- The Brutals
- The Burton Cool Suit
- The City Views
- Captain Denim
- Carton
- Chewee
- Crow
- The Daisygrinders
- Craven Fops
- Dog Trumpet
- Deezleteens
- Jon Duncan
- The Eastern Dark
- The Exbats
- Fragile
- Fuzzy
- Grandview
- Glovebox
- Godstar
- The Hotpoints
- Hippy Dribble
- I do You do Karate
- John Dowler's Vanity Project
- Khancoban
- Key Out
- Kid Cornered
- Kim Salmon and the Business
- Kim Salmon and the Surrealists
- The Likes of You
- Love Parade
- Love Positions
- Luke Russell
- Machine translations
- The Missing Links
- Modern Bombers
- The Nagging Doubts
- Nic Dalton
- Nic Dalton and his Gloomchasers
- The Orange Humble Band
- Papas Fritas
- Pip Proud
- The Plunderers
- Pressed Meat & the Smallgoods
- The Proposition
- The Purple Hearts
- Python Lee Jackson
- The Ramalamas
- the Raylenes
- Ruby for lucy
- Rural France
- The Savages
- She Loves You Too
- Sidewinder
- The Smallgoods
- Smudge
- Sneeze
- Spdfgh
- The Sticker Club
- Swirl
- Swayback
- Tendrils
- The Triangles
- The Trouble Dolls
- Vermishus
- Warmer
- We Grow Up
- The Wednesday Night
- Whopping Big Naughty
- The Wild Cherries
- Wilding
- You & Your So-Called Friends

== See also ==
- List of record labels
