= Her Name in Lights =

Australian indie pop rock band

- Origin: Sydney, New South Wales, Australia
- Genres: Pop rock
- Years active: 2003–present
- Label: Laughing Outlaw/Reverberation
- Members: Almond Cafarella; Simon Gibson; Mary Wyer
- Past members: Alison Galloway; Simon Holmes
- Website: hernameinlights.com

Her Name in Lights are an Australian indie pop band led by Mary Wyer (ex-Even As We Speak) on lead vocals with her husband Almond Cafarella on guitar and piano, as well as Simon Holmes (died in 2017) of The Hummingbirds' fame on multiple instruments and Simon Gibson of Sneeze on drums. On 18 October 2004 they released their first album, Into the Light Again, on Laughing Outlaw Records.

== History ==
Mary Wyer (ex-Even As We Speak) on lead vocals formed Her Name in Lights in Sydney, initially as a studio band, to record tracks for an album, Into the Light Again. For the sessions, Wyer used Almond Cafarella (her then-boyfriend) on guitar and piano, Simon Holmes (of The Hummingbirds) on bass guitar, guitar pump organ and as producer, and Alison Galloway (of Smudge) on drums and percussion. By the time the album was released on 18 October 2004 via Laughing Outlaw Records the group had started gigging in Sydney and Simon Gibson of Sneeze replaced Galloway on drums as she returned to Smudge. Soph Gyles of Oz Music Project described the album as "quite pleasant, melodic pop with tempered female vocals, but it doesn't exactly make me want to have a bakesale in celebration". While Pennyblack Music's Malcolm Carter noted "[t]here’s not a dud song on here ... [t]he major attraction is Wyer's vocals, cute, youthful, but without any annoying feyness".
