= LoveBUZZ =

loveBUZZ

Studio album by the Hummingbirds
- Released: 1989
- Recorded: 1989
- Genre: Indie pop, jangle pop
- Label: RooArt/Polygram
- Producer: Mitch Easter

The Hummingbirds chronology
| loveBUZZ (1989) | Va Va Voom (1991) |

Singles from loveBUZZ
- 1. "Blush" Released: August 1989; 2. "Word Gets Around" Released: November 1989; 3. "Alimony" Released: March 1990

Professional ratings
Review scores
| Source | Rating |
|---|---|
| AllMusic | 4.5/5 stars |
| Select | 4/5 |

loveBUZZ is the debut album released by Australian rock band the Hummingbirds.

The album was released on the rooART label in 1989. It peaked at No. 31 on the national album charts. The album eventually reached sales of approximately 40,000 copies (exceeding the 35,000 required for Gold record certification in Australia). In October 2010, LoveBUZZ was listed in the book 100 Best Australian Albums.

== Reception ==
AllMusic said the band's "specialty was a power-pop/alternative rock style that served them well on loveBUZZ", and noted the album would be enjoyed by "those who like jangly guitar music that's lively and energetic but consistently appealing melodically and harmonically".

In The Sell-In, Craig Mathieson said, "Mitch Easter's disciplined approach had captured a guitar-spangled, fragile sound focussing attention on the voices. LoveBUZZ had enough romantic verve and sheer pop delight, mixed with the band's indie routes, to make the album one of the releases of the year."

== Track listing ==
All tracks written by Simon Holmes unless otherwise noted.

1. "Blush" - (Holmes, Robyn St Clare) 3:20
2. "She Knows..." - 4:39
3. "Hollow Inside" - 3:27
4. "Tuesday" (Alannah Russack) - 3:21
5. "Word Gets Around" - 2:56
6. "House Taken Over" - 6:05
7. "Get on Down" - 3:38
8. "Alimony" - 3:46
9. "Everything You Said" (St Clare) - 3:16
10. "Barbarian" - 3:51
11. "Three in the Morning" - 4:32
12. "Michelle as Well" - 3:54
13. "If You Leave" (Holmes, Russack, St Clare, Mark Temple) - 5:34
14. "Miles to Go" (St Clare) - 2:43

== Charts ==
| Chart (1989) | Peak position |
|---|---|
| Australian Albums (ARIA) | 31 |

== Personnel ==
=== The Hummingbirds ===
- Simon Holmes - guitar, vocals
- Alannah Russack - guitar, vocals
- Robyn St. Clare - bass, vocals
- Mark Temple - drums

=== Production ===
- Don Bartley - Mastering
- Paula Bray - Photography
- Mitch Easter - Producer, Engineer
- Justine - Assistant Engineer
- Tony Mott - Photography
- Paul - Assistant Engineer
- Jim "The Royster" Perry - Mixing Assistant
- Quiffboy Polanski - Executive Producer
- Robyn St. Clare - Photography
- Paul Tatz - Design, Layout Design
- Mark Williams - Mixing
- Mark Williams - Engineer
