= The Orange Humble Band =

Alternative rock band

- Origin: Sydney, New South Wales, Australia
- Genres: Alternative rock, power pop, folk, country, bluegrass
- Years active: 1995–2001, 2012–present
- Labels: Half a Cow, Citadel
- Members: Darryl Mather; Mitch Easter; Ken Stringfellow; Jody Stephens; Jon Auer; Dave Smith; Rick Steff
- Past members: Bill Gibson; Anthony Bautovich; Matt Galvin; Peter Kelly; Spooner Oldham; Jamie Hoover; Jim Dickinson

The Orange Humble Band are an Australian alternative rock band formed in early 1995 by Darryl Mather (ex-member of The Lime Spiders and The Someloves) on guitar. He was joined by Anthony Bautovich (Lonely Hearts), Mitch Easter (an American indie producer-manager) on vocals, and Ken Stringfellow (The Posies) on lead vocals. The group issued two albums, Assorted Creams (1997) and Humblin' (Across America) (2001) before disbanding later that year. They reformed in March 2012 and issued a third album, Depressing Beauty, in May 2015.

== Biography ==
The Orange Humble Band's founding mainstay, Darryl Mather (ex-Lime Spiders (1979–82)), had returned to the music scene in 1994, following a three-year absence after the break-up of his previous band, The Someloves (1986–90). He had more than an album's worth of new songs, which he took to his friend, Bill Gibson. Early in 1995 Mather with Gibson on bass guitar formed The Orange Humble Band in Sydney.

Recording of their debut album, Assorted Creams, started at 48 Volts and Charing Cross Studios, Sydney, with Anthony Bautovich (ex-Lonely Hearts) on vocals, Matt Galvin on lead guitar and Peter Kelly on drums. The final recordings took place in Mitch Easter's studios in North Carolina at Brickhenge and Reflection Studios in October 1996. Easter provided vocals, prior to Ken Stringfellow (ex-The Posies) being recruited. Assorted Creams was released in 1997 on the Half a Cow label in Australia, and on 14 July 1998 in the United States. Australian musicologist, Ian McFarlane, described it as "full of chiming guitars and sunshine-drenched 1960s melodies." James Chrispell of AllMusic found it was "a decidedly updated version of good-time music. Song after song comes along with a great melody and some interesting hippie-esque lyrics; here, there, and everywhere, there are hooks, hooks, and more hooks."

The album provided their first single, "Apple Green Slice Cut", in August 1998, which was followed by a five-track extended play, Down in Your Dreams. Alongside the title track, Chrispell felt the group "enhance their musical knowledge of pop by adding four extra tracks that vary in length and sound... A very nice added bonus for anyone who has picked up on one of Australia's little secrets of joy." One of its tracks, "Step on the Gas", had appeared on a Various Artist's compilation album, Cop It Sweet, on Antfarm Records in 1997.

The band's second album, Humblin’ (Across America) appeared in 2001, with work commencing on it eighteen months earlier. The line-up of Mather, Bautovich, Easter and Stringfellow were joined by Jody Stephens (Big Star, Golden Smog) on drums and Jamie Hoover (The Spongetones) on bass guitar. Spooner Oldham (Dan Penn, Aretha Franklin, Neil Young), and Jim Dickinson provided organ and piano on several tracks. Carmine Pascuzzi of Mediasearch website determined that "the listener is taken on an engaging journey. The whole exercise works cohesively. The country rock and rootsy atmospheres are very simple and effective, from the adept musicianship." Ahead of the album, in 2000, they issued a single, "Any Way You Want It", which included three non-album B-sides. By the end of the following year the group had disbanded.

In March 2012 Mather attended a preview of a documentary, Big Star: Nothing Can Hurt Me, at SXSW as guest of Stephens, where together with Easter and Stringfellow they agreed to reform The Orange Humble Band. Mather returned to Australia to write songs for a new album. Whilst preparing material, he contacted Dwight Twilley with a view to recording the latter's song, "You Close Your Eyes". Twilley agreed and additionally offered to help Mather write bridge sections for two of the new tracks and to appear as a guest backing vocalist. The Orange Humble Band recorded their third album in October 2012 at Ardent Studios in Memphis, which was produced by Easter. The album, Depressing Beauty, was released on 22 May 2015 via Citadel Records. The line-up comprised Mather, Easter, Stephens and Stringfellow joined by Jon Auer (The Posies, Big Star) on guitars, backing vocals and keyboards; Dave Smith (Cat Power) on bass guitar; and Rick Steff (Lucero) on piano and keyboards.

== Members ==
- Bill Gibson – bass guitar
- Darryl Mather – acoustic guitar
- Mitch Easter – lead guitar, lead vocals, engineer, mixing, producer
- Ken Stringfellow – lead vocals
- Anthony Bautovich – lead guitar, backing vocals
- Matt Galvin – lead guitar
- Peter Kelly – drums
- Jody Stephens – drums
- Spooner Oldham – organ (Hammond), piano, Wurlitzer
- Jamie Hoover – mandolin, backing vocals
- Jim Dickinson – bass guitar
- Jon Auer – guitars, backing vocals, keyboards
- Dave Smith – bass guitar
- Rick Steff – piano, keyboards

== Discography ==
=== Albums ===
- Assorted Creams – Half a Cow (1997)
- Humblin' (Across America) – Half a Cow (2001)
- Depressing Beauty – Citadel (22 May 2015)

=== Extended plays ===
- Down in Your Dreams – Half a Cow (1998)

=== Singles ===
- "Apple Green Slice Cut" – Half a Cow (August 1998)
- "Any Way You Want It" – Half a Cow (2000)
