= The Plunderers (band) =

Australian band

- Origin: Canberra, Australian Capital Territory, Australia
- Genre: Rock
- Years active: 1984–1995
- Labels: Rattlesnake, Green Fez, Citadel, Half A Cow
- Spinoffs: Hippy Dribble, Captain Denim
- Spinoff of: Get Set Go
- Past members: Nic Dalton; Lindsay Dunbar; Stevie Plunder; Peter Velzen; Andy Lewis; Geoff Milne; Elmo Reid

The Plunderers were an Australian band which formed in May 1984 in Canberra. The group's founding mainstays were Nic Dalton on bass guitar and vocals and Stevie Plunder (born Anthony Hayes) on guitar and vocals. The group issued three mini-albums, Trust Us (June 1988), Sarah's not Falling in Love (April 1990), and Home Movie (1992); a live album, 13.7.91 Live! Live! Live! (1991); and three albums, No Era Is Safe (1986), Half A Cow (1986), and Banana Smoothie Honey (1992). Australian musicologist Ian McFarlane described their sound as "a punky brand of power pop that mixed frantic guitar riffs, sharp harmonies, and diamond-hard pop melodies" before starting to "explore a more tripped-out kind of psychedelic revivalism". In 1989 Dalton and Plunder and their drummer, Geoff Milne, formed a side project, Hippy Dribble, playing their more psychedelic songs. In December 1990 the trio also formed Captain Denim to play "more laid-back songs mostly ... influenced by the likes of Buffalo Springfield, Country & western, and folk rock". Both these groups issued material, including a split album, Silver Apples/Fade in 1994. In 1992, Dalton joined the US band The Lemonheads and former Plunderers' keyboard player Andy Lewis and Plunder formed The Whitlams with Tim Freedman. Plunder died on 25 January 1996, at the age of 32 years, and Lewis died on 12 February 2000, at the age of 33 years.

== History ==
The Plunderers formed in January 1984 in Canberra with Nic Dalton on bass guitar and vocals, Stevie Plunder (born Anthony Hayes) on guitar and vocals; and Elmo Reid on drums. In May 1984 Lindsay Dunbar joined on drums, along with David Branson on violin and Jacquie Martin on saxophone. Dalton and Plunder had been members of Get Set Go, a folk-pop band, with Suzie and Jenny Higgie. Suzie later recalled, "Down at Commonwealth Park there used to be a tunnel with a power point ... My first band with Nic Dalton and Stevie Plunder – we wrote most of our songs down there". Dunbar soon left, and the group went into hiatus for six months. In June 1985 Dalton and Plunder were joined by The Gadflys' drummer Peter Velzen, who also provided lead vocals. This line-up released their debut single, "Strange Affection" on their own label, Rattlesnake Records. It had been recorded in August with the group self-producing at Trafalgar Studios. The group moved to Melbourne in October and added Andy Lewis on keyboards, guitar and harmony vocals. They released two music cassette albums, No Era Is Safe and Half A Cow both in 1986.

By the end of 1986, they relocated to Sydney and performed at inner-city venues. Andy Lewis left the band in 1987. In June 1988 they issued their debut five-track mini-album, Trust Us, which was produced by Charlie Owen (guitarist, pianist for New Christs) on the Green Fez label. They followed in November with another single, "I Don't Mind", produced by Rob Younger (ex-Radio Birdman, vocalist for New Christs). In January 1989 Pillage was replaced on drums by Geoff Milne (ex-Eastern Dark). The group issued their next single, "I Didn't Even See Them at All", in June 1989 on Citadel Records. In March the following year they issued another five-track mini-album, Sarah's not Falling in Love, which was produced by Younger. In September another single, "Christo", appeared, which was followed in July the next year by a four-track mini-album, Home Movie, produced by Younger. The Plunderers' sound was described by Australian musicologist, Ian McFarlane, as "a punky brand of power pop that mixed frantic guitar riffs, sharp harmonies and diamond-hard pop melodies". McFarlane noted their sound had started to "explore a more tripped-out kind of psychedelic revivalism".

In 1989 Hippy Dribble was formed as a side project with Dalton as Nic Dribble, Milne as Geoff Dribble and Plunder as Stevie Dribble. Hippy Dribble played psychedelic pop and issued a four-track extended play, Wild Strawberri, in November 1990 on their own Trip Records label. The trio formed another side project, Captain Denim, in December 1990 to play "more laid-back songs mostly from the very early Plunderers days when they were influenced by the likes of Buffalo Springfield, Country & Western and folkrock". In 1991 Dalton formed Godstar, a psychedelic pop band. He continued with The Plunderers in 1992, which issued a full-length album, Banana Smoothie, Honey, on Citadel and an eight-track live album, 13.7.91 Live! Live! Live! on Club Records. In 1992, Dalton joined the US band The Lemonheads and Lewis and Plunder formed The Whitlams so the band was put on a break.

In 1992, Hippy Dribble released another four-track EP, Cheerleader, on Dalton's own label, Half A Cow. In April that year, Hippy Dribble resumed and issued a split album: their side is Silver Apples; while Captain Denim is on the other side with Fade; on the Half a Cow label. The material had been recorded four years earlier by the line-up of Dalton, Milne and Plunder. According to Dalton "Hippy Dribble were a bit more psychedelic and modern, whereas Plunderers were more of a rock band". After Dalton left to join the Lemonheads, Plunder joined New Christs and then formed The Whitlams with Tim Freedman and former The Plunderers' bandmate, Andy Lewis. Dalton performed in various groups, including Love Positions, The Gloomchasers and Ratcat; and also issued solo material. By 1995 Milne had joined Red Planet Rockets on drums.

On 26 January (Australia Day) 1996, Stevie Plunder was found dead at the bottom of Wentworth Falls in the Blue Mountains, at the age of 32 years. The Plunderers would be no more after this event. On 12 February 2000 Andy Lewis died, at the age of 33 years. In November 2000 Half A Cow re-issued Banana Smoothie, Honey in a 2× CD format with five bonus tracks originally released by Hippy Dribble or Captain Denim. In September 2005 Dalton recalled, "The Plunderers kept saving our songs for our first album. Stevie Plunder died and we never got to record an album—my single biggest regret regarding music. We had all these great songs that were never recorded". In 2008 Dalton issued a retrospective album, Last Seen Near Trafalgar 87-89, which included original versions of early The Plunderers material.

== Discography ==
=== Albums ===
The Plunderers

- No Era Is Safe – Rattlesnake (cassette) (1986)
- Half A Cow – Rattlesnake (cassette) (1986)
- Banana Smoothie Honey – Citadel Records (CITCD527) (1992), Half A Cow (HAC93) (2000)

Hippy Dribble/Captain Denim

- Silver Apples/Fade – Half a Cow (1994)

=== Live albums ===
The Plunderers

- Hot August Knights – Pray Tell (cassette) (1985)
- 13.7.91 Live! Live! Live! – 10 inch Club Records (1992)

=== Extended plays ===
The Plunderers

- Trust Us – Green Fez (FEZ801) (June 1988)
- Sarah's not Falling in Love – 10 inch Citadel Records (CITEP201) (April 1990)
- Home Movie – 10 inch Citadel Records (CITEP202) (July 1991)

Hippy Dribble

- Wild Strawberri – Trip Records (1990)
- Cheerleader – Half A Cow Records (1993)

Captain Denim

- Fade – Vest Records (1992)

=== Singles ===
- "Strange Affection" – (1985)
- "I Don't Mind" – (1988)
- "I Didn't Even See Them at All" – (1989)
- "Christo" – (1989)

=== Other appearances ===
- "Windows Wide" – 2XX Beyond The Wireless Various Artists (1985)
- "Yankee Trash", "Dawn Patrol" – Pounding Tales Comic (Pounding Tales, 1987)
- "No Fun" – Hard to Beat (Au Go Go Records, 1989) (Note: Tribute album for The Stooges by various Australian artists)
- "Dying" – Positively Elizabeth Street (Citadel Records, 1989)
- "24 Days Till Biscuits" – Rockin' Bethlehem (Timberland Records, 1989)
- "Charisma" – Hard to Believe (Waterfront Records, 1990) (Note: Tribute album for Kiss by various Australian artists)
