= Andy Lewis (bassist) =

- Born: Andrew Joseph Lewis; 16 June 1966
- Died: 12 February 2000 (aged 33)
- Genre: Rock
- Occupation: Musician
- Instruments: Bass guitar, double bass
- Years active: 1985–2000
- Formerly of: The Plunderers, The Whitlams, The Gadflys

Andrew Joseph Lewis (16 June 1966 – 12 February 2000) was the original bassist of Australian band The Whitlams. He first played in Canberra, Australia in a duo called In Limbo, playing Everly Brothers and other songs from the 1950s and 60s with two acoustic guitars and close harmonies. In October 1985, he joined Canberra band, The Plunderers, on keyboards, guitar and harmony vocals. He left The Plunderers in April 1987, leaving a small legacy of recordings with the band, most noticeably a version of The Velvet Underground's "Stephanie Says" and the original version of Stevie Plunder's "Where Are You?". In 1992, he formed The Whitlams but left them in late 1995, and went to Melbourne to join The Gadflys. He battled a gambling addiction and committed suicide in February 2000, aged 33, after losing an entire week's pay in a poker machine.

"Blow Up the Pokies", co-written by Tim Freedman (The Whitlams) not long before Lewis' death, is a comment on the destruction that Freedman saw in Lewis' life because of his gambling. It was awaiting release as a single at the time. Freedman soon after wrote "The Curse Stops Here", a song describing being the "last one" from the original line-up of The Whitlams, and voicing his determination to survive. "The Curse Stops Here" was included as a B-side track on the "Blow Up the Pokies" single.

A month after Lewis' death, a benefit concert was held at the Metro Club in Sydney to raise money for his partner and child. The event was hosted by Paul McDermott, Mikey Robins and Steve Abbott (The Sandman), and performers included Max Sharam, Frank Bennett and The Gadflys.

Lewis played bass on Frank Bennett's 1996 recording Five O'Clock Shadow.
