= Orana Steiner School =

Private school in Canberra, Australia

Location
- Weston Creek, Australian Capital Territory; Australia; 35.327°S 149.059°E

Information
- Type: private, Steiner, day
- Motto: Outstanding education that lasts a lifetime
- Established: 1981
- Principal: James Goodlet
- Enrolment: 441 (2024)
- Website: www.oranaschool.com

Orana Steiner School is an independent, co-educational, Steiner school in the Canberra suburb of Weston, Australian Capital Territory, Australia. It is administered by the Association of Independent Schools of the ACT, with an enrolment of 441 students and a teaching staff of 49 as of 2024. The school serves students from Kindergarten to Year 12 and was founded in 1981. It follows the education philosophies of Rudolf Steiner.

== History ==
The school opened in August 1981 in the old YMCA hall in Yarralumla with three foundation students and Michael Simmons as the sole teacher. The parents of one of the foundation students paid the teacher's salary for a little over a year after the school's opening. By the end of 1981, there were 11 students and by the following year there were 15 students. A second teacher with no Waldorf training joined the school to teach Kindergarten the very same year. By 1986, there were 70 students.

The school was granted access to facilities at Yarralumla Primary School by the ACT Schools Authority for the 1983 school year, on the condition that it begin negotiations with the state school to explore incorporating the Steiner philosophy into the government school system.

In 1988, the school was negotiating with the ACT administration for the new school site to be located on the same street as the AME school and 1.5km from Holder Primary School. When Orana's new site negotiations were announced, parents of Holder Primary School were in the amidst of campaigning against the closure of the school. In response to the news, the school board chair of Holder Primary, Lois Cooper, stated that it was illogical of the State Government to close a public school while facilitating the opening of a private school in the area. While the principal of the AME school stated that the school council preferred that two small schools of differing philosophies were not close together. The principle of Orana stated that local enrolments would not be affected, due to the fact that students were drawn from around the Australian Capital Territory and New South Wales due to the school's philosophy. It had 100 students aged 5 to 12 years old at this time. The school was ultimately relocated in 1990 to its current site in Weston following a period of expansion and negotiations with the ACT Government over suitable long-term accommodation. The AME school closed in 1996, and Holder Primary closed at the end of 1990. The school buildings of the AME school were then sold to the Orana School to pay off the AME's bank overdraft.

In 1990, the school applied to the Australian Government for funding to extend the year levels from the then current Kindergarten to Year 6 to include Year 7 and Year 8 for the 1992 school year. In 1993, it was claimed that the school would offer Year 7 to Year 12 in 1994, however, Year 7 was only offered in the 1994 school year. Year 8 enrolments started to be offered by late 1994. Year 9 was introduced in 1996. In 1995, it was claimed that the school would offer Year 10 by 1997 and Year 11 by 1998. The school hoped to offer Year 12 by the year 2000, however, the Year 12 cohort commenced in 2002. The reason for the significant delay of the commencement of higher grades was due to the fact that the local council believed it would threaten the viability of existing government schools and affect the delivery of then current programs and services.

== School ==
=== Finance ===
A majority of the school's income is sourced from Government grants (both recurrent and capital) and school fees. As of 2022, 37% of the school's income was from Australian Government grants, 10% from the ACT Government and 53% from school fees, with the remaining 1% coming from 'other private sources'.

In 2021, the school's income was $67,811.57 with the total expenses being $55,903.52. The school's income increased to $99,625.23 with the total expenses increasing to $67,008.77 in 2022. By 2023, the school's income had decreased to $75,569 with the expenses being $55,246. Despite this significant decrease in the school's income, the Parents and Community Association of the school stated they were in a 'healthy financial position' to fund projects in 2024. However, the decrease in the school's income led to some financial concerns surrounding the school, with some parents sending a letter to the school board calling for a 'special general meeting'. Since the meeting was authorised under the school's constitution, it went forward, occurring on 30 May 2023. The meeting discussed the school's financial issues and staff turnover. Even though a call for a vote for the Board Chair, Rachel Thomas, to step down and the rest of the board positions to be declared vacant for a new board to be elected was anticipated to occur during the meeting, it did not happen.

==== Fees ====
School fees are set annually by the school's board. The cost of Tuition varies by grade. In 2001, the tuition fee for students in Kindergarten to Year 1 was $560 per term (~$2,240 annual), Year 2 was $575 per term (~$2,300 annual), Year 3 to Year 6 was $590 per term (~$2,360 annual), Year 7 to Year 10 was $785 per term (~$3,140 annual) and Year 11 was $870 per term (~$3,480 annual). (Note: The school did not enrol Year 12 until 2002.) By 2013, the cost of tuition had increased. The tuition fee for students in Kindergarten was $1,300 per term ($5,200 annual), Year 1 to Year 5 was $1,190 per term ($4,760 annual), Year 6 was $1,230 per term ($4,920 annual), Year 7 was $1,250 per term ($5,000 annual), Year 8 to Year 10 was $1,250 per term ($6,360 annual) and Year 11 and 12 was $1,750 per term ($7,000 annual). As of 2025, the tuition fee for students in Kindergarten to Year 2 is $2,805 per term ($11,222 annual), Year 3 to Year 5 the fee is $3,101 per term ($12,404 annual), Year 6 and Year 7 the fee is $3,249 per term ($12,994 annual), Year 8 to Year 10 the fee is $3,987 per term ($15,947 annual) and Year 11 and 12 is $4,430 per term being $17,720 for the year.

=== Facilities ===
In 1989, the school began Stage 1 of the school building project, which consisted of eight classrooms and two toilet blocks. By July 1990, the school had moved into the new buildings. A grant of about $260,000 was provided to the school for this purpose. The official opening of the buildings occurred on the school's opening day in September 1990. The minister for Employment, Education and Training, John Dawkins, opened the school on this day. In 1993, more classrooms were proposed.

The Ironbark Music building was expected to be completed at the end of 2023, but completed in January 2024. The building cost $1.5 million, with the ACT Government funding $800,000 of it.

=== Curriculum ===
The teaching curriculum is based on the works of Rudolf Steiner and is recognised by the Australian Curriculum, Assessment and Reporting Authority. The school offers a wide range of subjects including mathematics, sciences, humanities, languages, arts, design-technology and English. In primary school, the education is delivered by the class teachers through main lessons and classes with lots of practical activities to aid in understanding. As they get older, students discover more subjects and new specialist teachers. They have the opportunity to try out different at art and design subjects before getting to choose them as electives in later high school. This gives a well-rounded understanding of different subjects and promotes informed and experienced decision making. The school claims that it has an excellent reputation for its academic achievements, and claims high ATAR scores although these need to be compared with Canberra averages. It also boasts a broad education that prepares its students to take their place in a global society. The school aims to inspire creative and flexible thinking, resilience and a will to engage in life.

== Demographics ==
The Australian Curriculum, Assessment and Reporting Authority (ACARA), through its Data Access Program, publishes annual school profiles that include demographic data. These reports have been available since 2008 and provide information on enrolment figures, staffing, and student backgrounds.

According to ACARA data:

- In 2022, the school had a student enrolment of 502 with 49 teachers (44.6 full-time equivalent) and 27 non-teaching staff (22 full-time equivalent). Female enrolments consisted of 250 students and Male enrolments consisted of 252 students; Indigenous enrolments accounted for a total of 3% and 7% of students had a language background other than English.
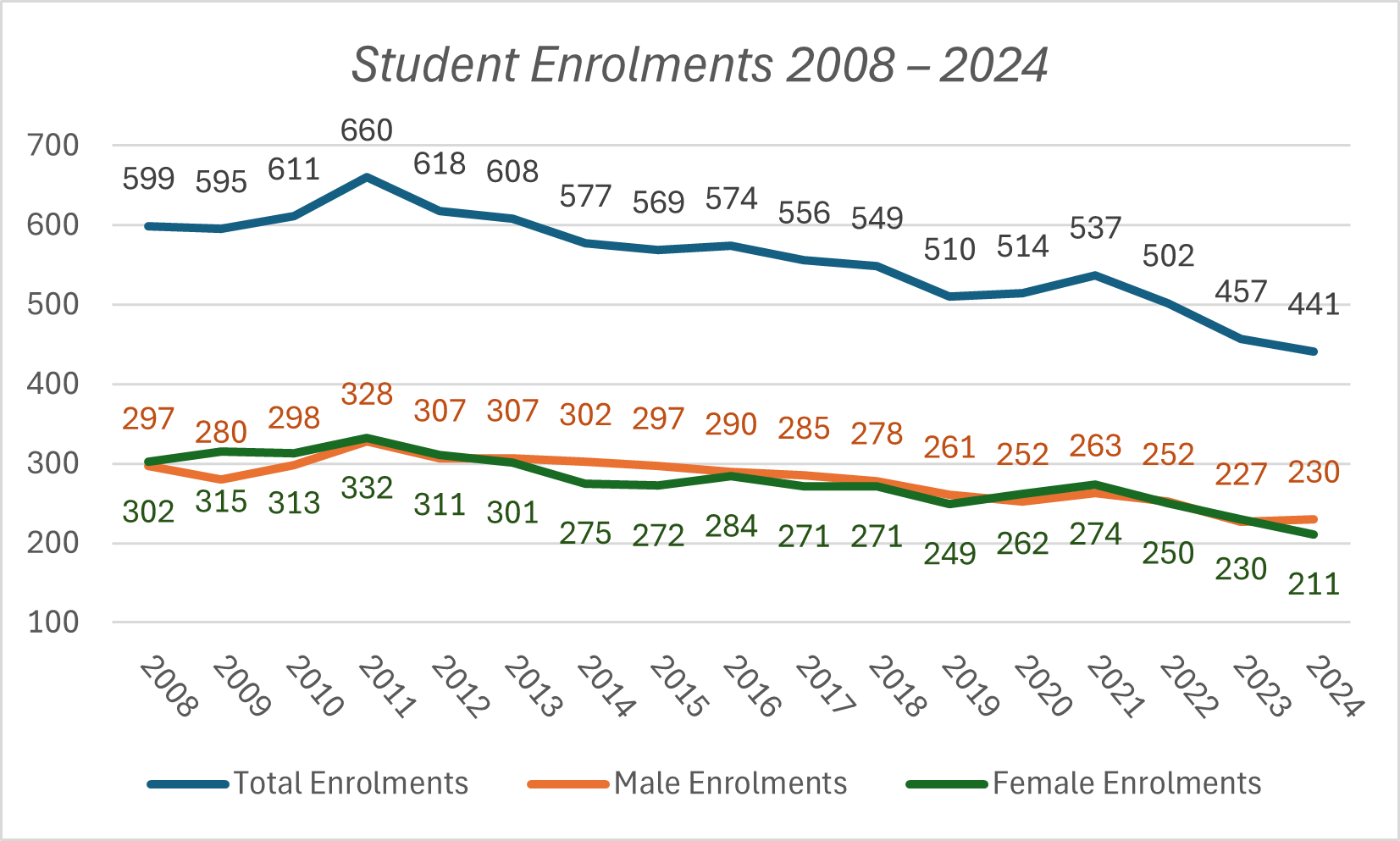
  Orana Steiner School Student Enrolment Data 2008 to 2024.
- In 2023, the school had a student enrolment of 457 with 50 teachers (43.3 full-time equivalent) and 34 non-teaching staff (25.9 full-time equivalent). Female enrolments consisted of 230 students and Male enrolments consisted of 227 students; Indigenous enrolments accounted for a total of 3% and 7% of students had a language background other than English.
- In 2024, the school had a student enrolment of 441 with 49 teachers (41.8 full-time equivalent) and 30 non-teaching staff (23.3 full-time equivalent). Female enrolments consisted of 211 students and Male enrolments consisted of 230 students; Indigenous enrolments accounted for a total of 3% and 8% of students had a language background other than English.

The decline in student enrolments has led to some financial concerns surrounding the school. The school board chair, Rachel Thomas, responded to the concerns by stating "while it has affected the school's budgeting...we adjust our financial strategy to respond."

== Notable alumni ==
Alumni lists are available on the Names Database. Notable alumni include the original band members of the Australian band Teen Jesus and the Jean Teasers. In 1995, 11-year-old student Hannah Quinlivan was noted in The Canberra Times for publicly challenging Arthur Tunstall's remarks about Aboriginal athletes Cathy Freeman and Lionel Rose.

== See also ==
- Education in the Australian Capital Territory
- List of schools in the Australian Capital Territory
