= Kate Buchdahl =

Australian violinist (1964–1992)

Kate Buchdahl (30 September 1964 – 10 December 1992) was a classically trained Australian violinist.

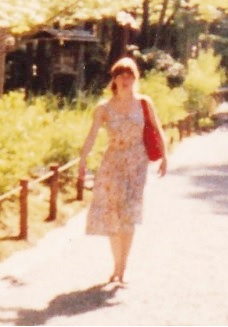

Catriona Alexis Buchdahl grew up in Canberra. Her father was Emeritus Professor Hans Buchdahl, Professor of Theoretical Physics at the Australian National University, Her siblings were Tanya Buchdahl, who married the conductor Georg Tintner, and Dr Nicholas Buchdahl, Associate Professor of Pure Mathematics at University of Adelaide.

She attended the AME School upon its inception in 1972. She later graduated from the Canberra School of Music (now the ANU School of Music) and went on to attend the Juilliard School in New York 1983–87. She then studied with Sándor Végh at the Mozarteum in Salzburg, and with Valeri Klimov in Saarbrücken. Kate toured internationally as a member of the Camerata Accademica, conducted by Sándor Végh.

She died from Hodgkin's lymphoma on 10 December 1992.

The Australian National University now awards a scholarship, The Kate Buchdahl Memorial Prize, to promising musicians completing their studies at the ANU School of Music.
