= Turnstyle (band) =

Band from Perth, Western Australia

- Turnstyle in 1998

Background information
- Origin: Perth, Western Australia, Australia
- Genre: Rock
- Years active: 1995–2002, 2010–present
- Labels: Igloo, Shock, Spunk!, Valve Records
- Members: Adem K; Paul Fanning; Dean Davies; Todd Griffiths
- Website: https://turnstyleband.bandcamp.com/

Turnstyle are an Australian indie rock band from Perth, in Western Australia. They are known for their use of cheap Casio keyboards, cheap off-set instruments and lo-fi recording techniques.

== History ==
Turnstyle formed in 1995 by Adem Kerimofski (aka Adem K) and Paul Fanning. Fanning is related to actor Jackie Coogan, Uncle Fester from The Addams Family. The other members being Todd Griffiths and Dean Davies. By 1997 their second release took them from obscurity to the band of choice on line-ups and supports in mere months. In 1998, to support that EP "Seasides", they embarked on their first Australian tour and featured on ABC Television's 'Recovery'. A change in drummer in mid-1998 reinvigorating the band, writing 30 songs in 6 months. They recorded their debut album Turnstyle Country in 1998/99 as a self-funded, unsigned band, eventually signing to Spunk! Records after being turned down by Sony for being too weird. The first single "Spray Water On The Stereo" gained airplay and TV coverage, reaching 16 on the ARIA charts and number 7 on its independent counterpart chart. The band toured throughout the year, joining Trans Am on tour and playing the Glenworth Valley Weekender with The Foo Fighters, The Avalanches and The Offspring. "Spray Water On The Stereo" made it onto Triple J’s Hottest 100 at number 94 and the band were the Oz Music featured artist in November the same year. Over the next two years, shows included a tour with Guided By Voices and supporting their heroes Yo La Tengo.

Spent musically, in the face of a changing industry and personal circumstances, the band managed one more album, Turnstyle Corporation in 2001 shortly before announcing a break from live performance and recording. Two sold-out shows heralded what became an 8-year hiatus. The band reunited in 2010, then permanently in 2013. They released the album Time Equals Function in 2015, mixed and mastered in London by Andy Ramsay of Stereolab. In 2018 Turnstyle released Happy Factories, a crisp record that eschewed pedestrian themes for more contemplative subject matter. The album features vocals by Pavement's Bob Nastanovich on one song.

In 2020 the band prepared a compilation of their Casiotone-heavy material as a musical companion to their inclusion in the Western Australian Museum Boola Bardip for their innovative creative process. They are represented by a replica of their late 90s stage set up featuring 3 keyboards attached to an ironing board. The compilation "Key Note Speaker" was released by Valve Records, home to Regurgitator, Shonen Knife and others. During this time and amidst the COVID-19 pandemic in Western Australia, the band began recording a new album, releasing two singles "We Ran with the Pack" in 2021 and "Plain & Simple" in 2023.

In June 2023, the band announced the title of their new album as Citizens' Handbook, with the album being released in September 2023. This was followed by two music videos, one of which was filmed at night in a deserted location. The band and crew narrowly escaped an attempted assault by a man wielding a chain.

In late 2024 the band reissued their 2001 album "Turnstyle Corporation after some post production adjustments, re-recording and a final remaster. The band then took a substantial break, finally reconvening in September 2025 to begin demos for a new album. In early 2026 the band entered Revolver Sound Studios where by their own admission, recorded 12 basic tracks in 9 hours.

in October 2025 the band embarked on their first tour outside of Western Australia for the first time in 21 years supporting Shonen Knife.

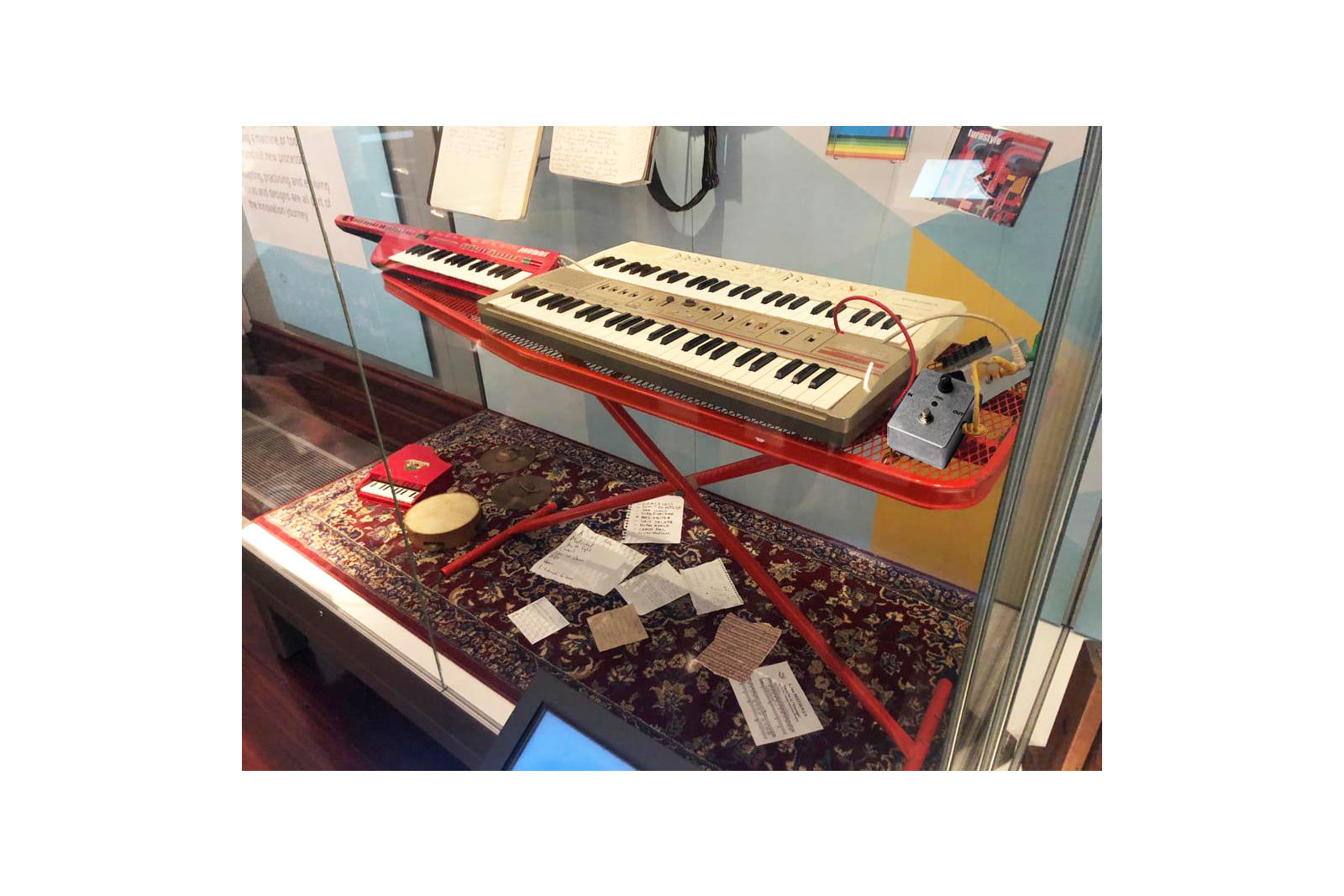
Turnstyle's keyboard setup as featured in the Western Australian Museum

== Discography ==
=== Albums ===
- Turnstyle Country – Spunk! (1999)
- Turnstyle Corporation – Spunk! (22 October 2001)
- Time Equals Function – Igloo (4 December 2015)
- Happy Factories – Igloo (1 December 2018)
- Citizens' Handbook – Igloo (2 September 2023)
- Turnstyle Corporation - Corporate Restructure (2024) A reissue of their 2001 album with additional recording and editing conducted in 2024.

=== EPs ===
- Turnstyle (cassette) – Igloo Records (September 1995)
- Itcheekneesonchee (cassette) – Igloo Records (February 1997) – initially limited to 100 copies but followed by multiple pressings
- Seasides – Shock Records (November 1997)
- Sad Rambo – Igloo Records (May 2002), limited to 100 copies

=== Singles ===
- "Spray Water on the Stereo" / "Manhattan" – Spunk! (1999) – AUS No. 86
- "Purple Crown" – Igloo Records (1999)
- "I'm a Bus" – Igloo Records (2000)
- "Portamento" – Spunk! (2000)
- "World Famous in Perth" – Spunk! (2001)

=== Compilations ===
- Geek Party – Igloo Records (2000)
- Colour Me In Vol 1 – Igloo Records (April 2013), limited to 50 copies – a collection of old demo recordings to commemorate the 2013 reunion
- Colour Me In Vol 2 – Igloo Records (July 2014), limited to 50 copies – a further collection of demo and outtake recordings
- Colour Me In Vol 3 – Igloo Records (April 2020), digital only – a collection of demo and outtake recordings post 2013 reunion
- Key Note Speaker – Valve Records (March 2021), vinyl - conceived to complement the band's inclusion in the Western Australian Museum
