= Ruby for Lucy =

Australian indie folk music duo

- Genres: Folk
- Years active: 2007–2011
- Labels: Half A Cow Records
- Members: Julie Stenton and Katrina Borghetti
- Website: Ruby for Lucy on Myspace

Ruby for Lucy is an indie folk duo from Sydney, Australia. The band, consisting of Julie Stenton and Katrina Borghetti, is currently signed to Half A Cow Records. Their debut album, Catching Bream, was released in 2010. Ruby for Lucy is best known for opening for acts such as Abby Dobson and Skipping Girl Vinegar as well as music festivals such as The National Folk Festival, Illawarra Folk Festival, Dorrigo Folk & Bluegrass Festival, Folk in Broke, Cobargo Folk Festival, Nannup Music Festival. The two have also performed on Channel 7’s, Sunrise.

Ruby for Lucy formed in June 2007 when the two met through an online music site. They found they lived around the corner from one another in Glebe, Sydney, and they have been writing music and performing ever since.

The band's debut album Catching Bream was released in 2010 to positive reviews. Rory McCartney of BMA Magazine says that the release "is as much a deep conversation between dear friends as a collection of songs. Whimsical tales explore the poetry that exists below the surface of everyday life, if only you bother to look".
