= Adem K =

Australian musician

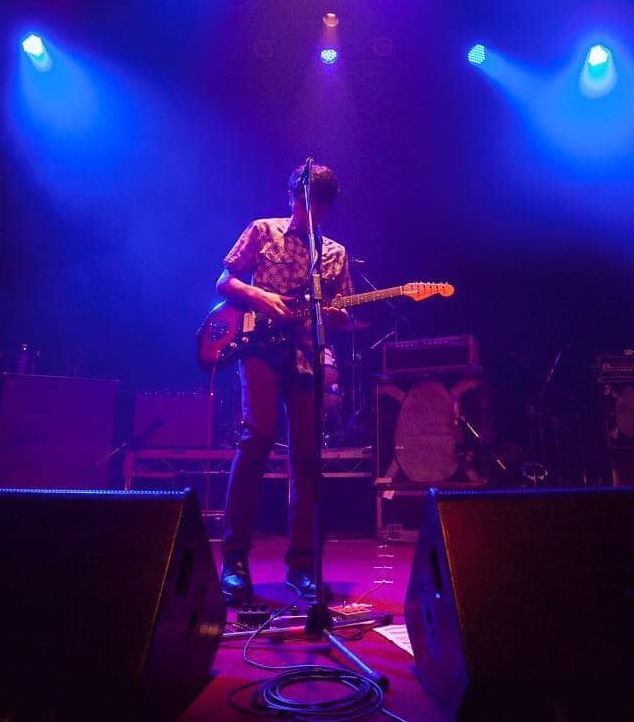

Background information
- Born: Adem Kerimofski; 10 January 1975 (age 51); Mount Lawley, Western Australia, Australia
- Origin: Perth, Western Australia, Australia
- Genre: Rock
- Occupations: Musician, university educator
- Instruments: Vocals, guitar, drums, percussion, keyboards, synthesizer
- Years active: 1995–present
- Labels: Spunk, Half A Cow, Valve Records, Love is My Velocity, Igloo Records
- Member of: Turnstyle

Adem Kerimofski (born 10 January 1975), known professionally as Adem K, is an Australian indie rock musician and songwriter. As a founding member of the group Turnstyle, Kerimofski is credited with introducing Casio and toy keyboard integration to the Australian contemporary rock music landscape in the late 1990s and early 2000s.

== Career ==
=== Turnstyle ===
Kerimofski's first band Turnstyle achieved a degree of success in 1999 with the single "Spray Water on the Stereo", reaching No. 16 on the ARIA Singles Charts. The band formed in 1995 and went on an eight-year hiatus in 2002. Reforming first in 2010 and again in 2013, the band has permanently reunited and after releasing the album Time Equals Function in 2015 (produced by Kerimofski), have played several shows and released a follow-up Happy Factories, released on 1 December 2018. When asked about the new release in a conversation with The West Australian, Kerimofski described it as "going to be oddball in parts but a bit more contemporary in sound". The band trickled short clips from the album on their Facebook page leading up to the album's release. In late 2020 the band signed to Valve Records (Regurgitator, Shonen Knife) and prepared the compilation KEY NOTE SPEAKER for release. The album features the band's Casio-heavy songs and one new song performed by only two members of the band due to the pandemic. The band released the album Citizens' Handbook in September 2023. This was followed by two music videos, one of which was filmed at night in a deserted location where the band was threatened by a man wielding a chain.

=== Mitey Ko ===
Kerimofski joined the duo of poet and activist Allan Boyd and WASO cellist/author Kevin Gillam in 2000 as a percussionist and keyboard player. In 2002, the band's music was the featured musical component of the independent film Teesh and Trude starring Peter Phelps and Susie Porter. Mitey Ko released 4 albums, all featuring Kerimofski.

=== The Burton Cool Suit ===
A band Kerimofski once described as "a kind of arranged marriage of indie rock and 60s garage rock", existed between 2003 and 2007. At the behest of some band members Kerimofski abandoned much of his past influences for the band's first release instead taking a more retro approach. The Burton Cool Suit supported Stephen Malkmus & The Jicks on their 2005 Australian tour as well as a varied list of other supports including The Buzzcocks, Idlewild and Youthgroup.The band's second album reintroduced some of Kerimofski's earlier influences by which time he had effectively annulled the band. In an interview with Perth Music Journalist Bob Gordon he said, "I felt like I was not making music for myself but for the people who still thought it was 1966, it just wasn't me. The last straw was when The Stems reneged on a promise of us supporting their Australian tour and I told them to go fuck themselves". The song 'SQ' was nominated for a WAM Song of the Year award in 2007. In July 2016 The Burton Cool Suit albums were digitally re-released by revered Australian independent record label Half A Cow. To commemorate the release the band performed two shows in October 2016.

=== The Community Chest ===
After releasing a well received solo album in 2010, Kerimofski formed the Community Chest with his wife Dee and Turnstyle producer Laurie Sinagra, winner of numerous West Australian Music Industry Awards. Originally formed to perform Adem's solo material, the band forged their own identity and eventually recorded a debut album, which was released in July 2013 on vinyl format. The band released an EP "Make Your Decision Now And Live With It Forever" in October 2015 which further explored Kerimofski's interest in drones, repetition and rural futurism. Self-produced, the EP was mastered by Stereolab producer Paul Tipler in London. The band released the "Concrete" EP in early September 2019, eschewing the drones and extended endings of their previous release for more compact songs with even stronger lead synth elements and sparse guitar work. The song "Reflections Through Corrugations" written by Kerimofski and sung by Dee came in at number 71 of radio station RTRFM's 100 most played songs of 2019. During the early days of the COVID-19 pandemic in Australia Kerimofski prepared several songs for release, releasing 3 as singles. The first single "In My Dreams" was released in September 2020 and mixed by American-born producer Casey Rice. It came in at number 24 of radio station RTRFM's 100 most played songs of 2020. The second single "Handshake" was recorded and mixed by the band with post-production by Andy Ramsay of Stereolab. It was launched with a custom brewed beer called "Hazy Handshake" using a recipe provided by Kerimofski. The third song, "SOUNDER" was mixed by Aaron Espinoza at Ship Studio in Los Angeles and features additional production and sound manipulation from Jason Lytle of Grandaddy.Adding two new songs and an alternate version of “Handshake”, the band released the synth-heavy EP “Mono/Poly” in March 2024.

=== Other ===
Kerimofski once played drums for Jens Lekman in 2005 during the latter's Australian tour. In 2014 he played drums for New South Wales band Shining Bird at one of their two Perth concerts. In November 2017, Kerimofski supported Laetitia Sadier, vocalist for Stereolab on her Australian tour as a solo artist, interpreting selections from his discography using guitar loops and live Casio. In early-2018, Kerimofski released an EP with ex-Lemonheads member and Half a Cow founder Nic Dalton on a project known as The Hotpoints, heavily influenced by Brian Eno and Turkish psychedelia. The EP was preceded by a 7"single in 2017. He toured Germany and Spain in October and November 2018. During this flurry of activity Kerimofski engineered for other artists ranging from synth-pop to country. In September 2019 Kerimofski performed a live comedy sketch with SNL alumni Fred Armisen on the latter's Australian tour. The two reportedly met after Kerimofski loaned Armisen a guitar amplifier for an instore performance earlier in the afternoon. In October 2019 Kerimofski toured Japan and live streamed a solo performance from a bar in Nakano City at the tour's conclusion. Since the pandemic, Kerimofski has concentrated mainly on his two bands and shifted some focus to his record label.

=== Record label ===
Kerimofski is the proprietor of Igloo Records. The label was conceived in 1995 as a means of releasing his music independently but by the end of the decade was used to license Turnstyle product to major labels. Since 2020 the label has released work from other artists and has been particularly successful in reissuing recordings from bands who broke up before the advent of streaming.

In February 2024 the label branched out and promoted a show for American musician Lou Barlow which after selling out in 24 hours was moved to a larger venue.

The label has an exclusive arrangement with MGM Distribution.

== Equipment ==
Kerimofski predominantly uses Fender guitars, such as Jazzmaster, Telecaster Deluxe and Jaguar and a pre-CBS 1965 Duo-Sonic II that he gifted to his wife in 2013. Kerimofski has been seen occasionally playing a 1967 Gibson SG Melody Maker. Live dates throughout 2015 and 2016 have seen him using a Guild S-100 reissue. After using a Fender 2 x 12 Deville amplifier for many years, in 2009 he switched to a Fender Deluxe '65 reissue, running it through a mid 70s Fender Bassman cabinet. At the beginning of 2018 he returned to using a larger amp, a Fender Twin Reverb. Kerimofski has remained loyal to Casio's MT series of keyboards and also owns a sizeable collection of Synthesizers including various Roland models, a Korg MS20, and monophonic Moog synths. Kerimofski claims to have the only working Farfisa Syntorchestra in Australia.

== Discography ==
=== with Turnstyle ===
- Turnstyle (1995) Cassette
- Itcheekneesonchee (1997) Cassette
- Seasides (1997) CD
- "Spray Water on the Stereo" (1999) CD single AUS No. 16
- Turnstyle Country (1999) CD
- Purple Crown (1999) CD single
- "Portamento" (1999) CD single
- "I'm A Bus" (2000) CD single
- "Geek Party" (2000) CD
- "Turnstyle Corporation" (2001) CD
- "Sad Rambo" (2002) CD, Limited to 100 copies
- "Colour Me In" (2013) CD, Limited to 50 copies
- "Colour Me in Vol 2" (2014) CD, Limited to 50 copies
- "Time Equals Function" (2015) CD, Digital
- "Happy Factories" (2018) CD, Cassette, Digital
- "Colour Me in Vol 3" (2020) Digital
- We Ran With The Pack (2021) Digital Single
- "Key Note Speaker" (2021) Vinyl, CD, Digital
- "Citizens’ Handbook" (2023) Vinyl, Cassette, Digital
- “Turnstyle Corporation - Corporate Restructure” (2024) CD, Digital. A reissue of their 2001 album with additional recording and editing conducted in 2024.

=== with Mitey Ko ===
- "2thresQ" (2000) CD
- "5% Famous" (2001) CD
- "Incidental Guerillas" (2003) CD
- "Devastated, Frustrated" (2008) CD

=== with The Burton Cool Suit ===
- "The Burton Cool Suit" (2005) CD
- You Can't Fight City Hall (2007) CD

=== Solo ===
- The Community Chest (2010) CD

=== with The Community Chest ===
- Top of the Hour (2013) Vinyl LP
- Make Your Decision Now And Live With It Forever (2015) CD EP
- Reflections Through Corrugations (2019) Digital Single
- Concrete (2019) CD EP
- In My Dreams (2020) Digital Single
- Handshake (2021) Digital Single
- Sounder (2021) Digital Single
- Mono/Poly (2024) CD EP

=== Other releases ===
- "The Town We Loved In", Showbag (2003) CD (as lead guitarist)
- "Death of Robot", Airport City Shuffle (2007) CD (as sound engineer)
- "Self-Titled", OkiOki (Recorded 2007, Released 2015) Digital (as sound engineer)
- "Welcome to the Growth Zone", When the Sky Fell (2009) CD (multi-instrumentalist, sound engineer)
- "Choose The Sentinel Blooze", 6s & 7s (2010) CD (as co-sound engineer, percussion and synthesiser)
- "Boy's Night", Spod (2017) single (as backing vocalist)
- "Crosswires/Gotcha!", The Hotpoints/Modern Bombers (2017) Split 7" single (multi-instrumentalist, sound engineer)
- "Perth Mint", The Hotpoints (2018) CD, Digital (multi-instrumentalist, sound engineer)
- "Invisible Seams", Em Burrows (2018) Vinyl, Digital (as sound engineer)
- "Swinging Simian Sounds", King Cornelius and the Silverbacks (2018) Vinyl, CD, Digital (guitar, organ, vocals)
- "No Caveat", Didion's Bible (2021) Cassette, Digital (as Producer)
- "AWWWW", Lonesome Dove (2021) CD, Cassette, Digital (as Producer)
- "Back in Time/Mall Grabbing", Dead Tooth Hottie (2022), 7" single, Digital (mixing)
- "Monkey or a Man/ Creature from the Black Lagoon", King Cornelius and the Silverbacks (2022), 7" single, Digital (guitar, organ, sound engineer)
- "Enter the Forbidden Zone", King Cornelius and the Silverbacks (2023) Vinyl, Digital (guitar, organ, vocals, sound engineer)
- "The Veil", Ruby Pettit (2023), Digital (overdub engineer)

=== Acting ===
Apart from occasional appearances in student films, Kerimofski began acting officially in 2024 with the horror film Proclivitas, co-produced by South Park producer Debbie Liebling. He followed this up with an appearance in season 3 of The Twelve (Australian TV series) as a police officer during scenes set in 1968. He appears as a detective in the upcoming television series LAM for Warner Brothers. The series charts the life of bank robber Brendan Abbott. Kerimofski was cast as a zombie in We Bury the Dead, starring Daisy Ridley but was unable to make it to set on time due to touring commitments with Turnstyle.

== Filmography ==
=== Film and television ===
Year	Title	Role or credit	Category
1998	Occasional Coarse Language	Music	Music department
2002	Teesh and Trude	Music	Music department
2007	The Search for Weng Weng	Additional crew	Additional crew
2018	About an Age	Music	Music department
2022–2025	The Twelve	Police Officer (uncredited; 3 episodes)	Acting
2025	Magic Bibs	Production department	
2025	Noticed	Production department	
2025	Proclivitas	Male Drinker	Acting
2026	Run	SA Detective (uncredited; 1 episode)	Acting

=== Other credits ===
Category	Number of credits listed on IMDb
Thanks	3
Self	1
Sound department	1
