= Wentworth Falls (waterfall) =

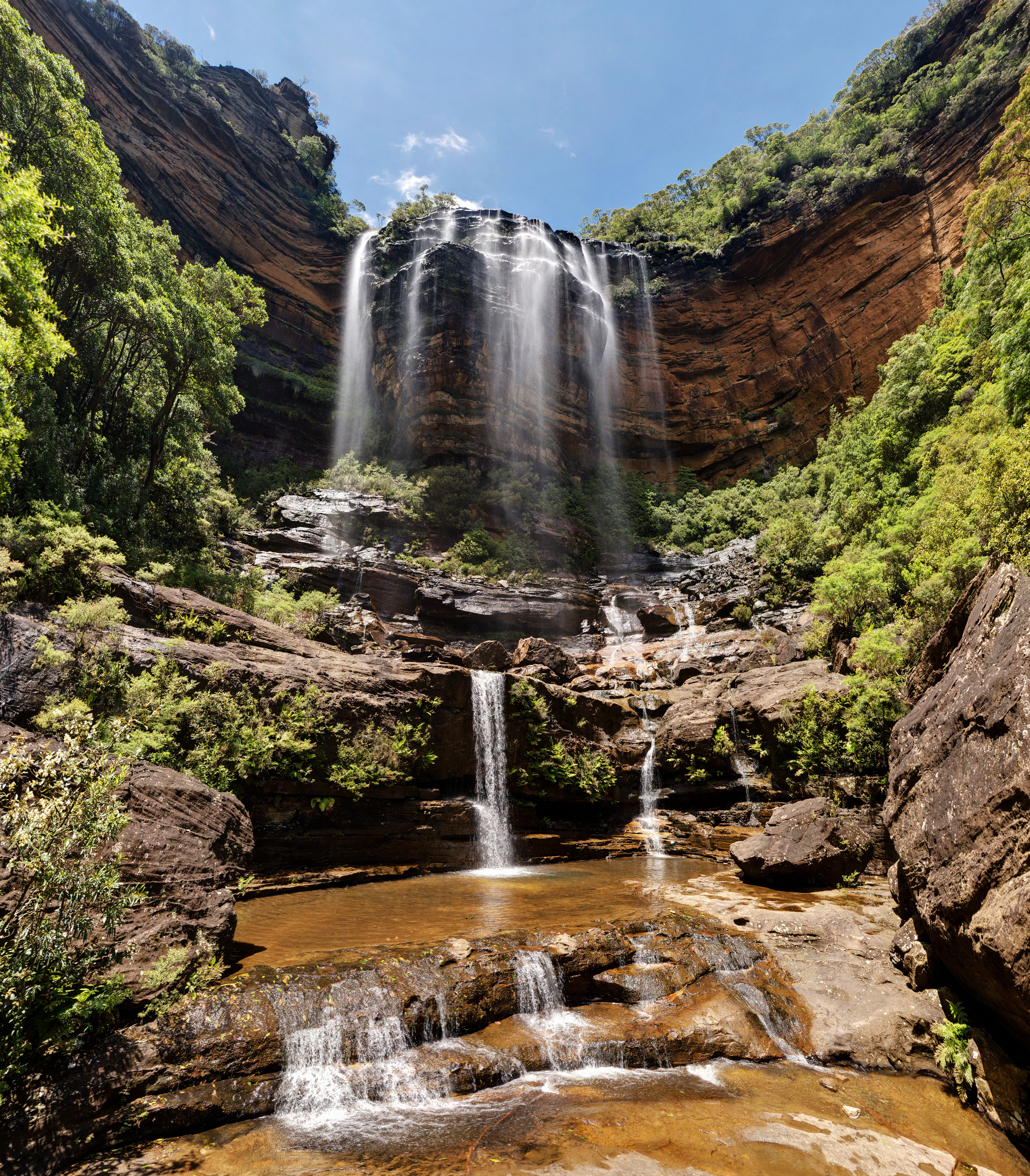
- Upper Wentworth Falls, the first section of Wentworth Falls waterfall, as viewed from the base. The falls are in two drops, with Lower Wentworth Falls below the frame. Both the first and second drop pictured.

- Location within New South Wales
- Location: Blue Mountains National Park, Australia
- Coordinates: 33°43′41″S 150°22′27″E
- Type: Tiered
- Total height: 187 m (614 ft)
- Number of drops: 3
- Watercourse: Jamison Creek

Wentworth Falls is a three-tiered waterfall fed by the Jamison Creek, near the town of Wentworth Falls in the Blue Mountains region of New South Wales, Australia. The falls are accessible via the National Pass Walking Trail and the Overcliff/Undercliff Walk. The total height of the waterfall is 187 metres (614 ft).

The falls and town are named after William Charles Wentworth, one of the members of the 1813 expedition across the Blue Mountains.

== Features and description ==
Near the falls, there is a rocky knoll that has a large number of grinding grooves created by rubbing stone implements on the rock to shape and sharpen them. These marks have been determined to be signs of early human habitation nearby.

In February 2013, following a period of high rainfall, the Wentworth Falls was reported as looking "spectacular" with torrents of water flowing.

== Access ==
A picnic area, accessible via a sealed road from the Great Western Highway, is located a short distance from the town of Wentworth Falls, with parking for cars and larger vehicles.

A view of the top of the falls is easily accessible from the Wentworth Falls Lookout which is accessed by a slightly sloping concrete path (wheelchair accessible) from the car park area. Stop first at the Jamison Lookout for views over the Jamison Valley.

There are two access points which lead down well-formed steps to Princes Lookout from where you can see most of the first two sections of the falls before they disappear into the valley below.

Other easy and challenging walking trails loop from the picnic area and follow the Jamison Creek south to the top of Wentworth Falls where scenic views over the expansive Jamison Valley to the south can be enjoyed. A trail follows the creek as it cascades down several waterfalls; with a further trail leading down into the valley floor.

=== Arriving by train ===
Accessed via the Blue Mountains Line from the Wentworth Falls railway station, the easiest way to reach the Blue Mountains National Park is to walk the Charles Darwin Walk. This walk follows Jamison Creek along a track that provides access to waterfalls and birdwatching. The walk is 2.4 kilometres (1.5 mi) one way (45 minutes to one hour and 15 minutes) and starts from Wilson Park (10 minutes from the railway station).

== Incidents ==
- In January 1996, 32-year-old Australian musician Stevie Plunder was found dead at the bottom of the waterfall after he reportedly committed suicide.
- In December 2000, 27-year-old British tourist Paul Marshall from Leicester died after accidentally falling 76 metres (250 ft) off the waterfall.
- In January 2013, 20-year-old British tourist Josh Furber from Runcorn died after accidentally falling 100 metres (330 ft) off the waterfall.

== Gallery ==
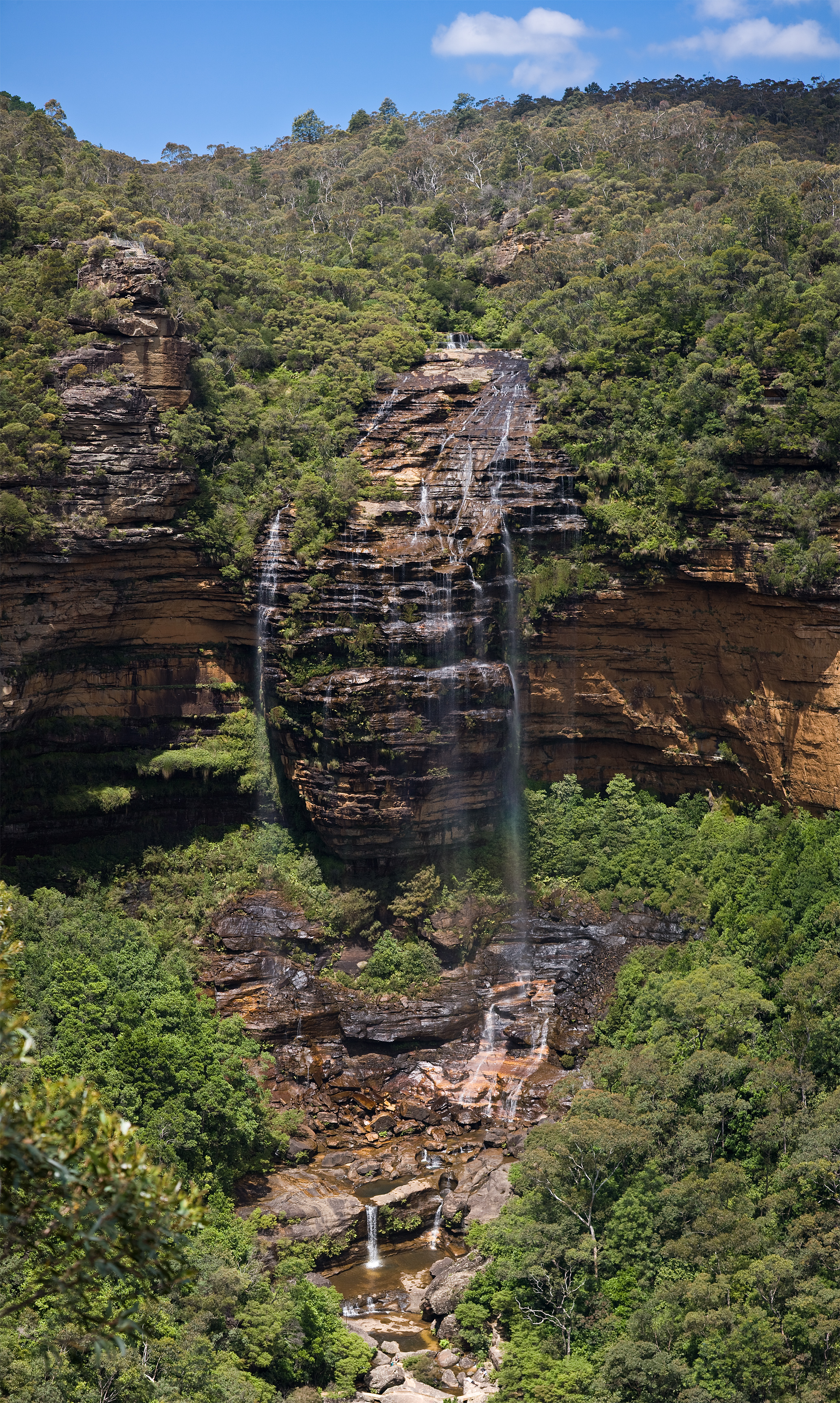
The Upper falls as viewed from the Overcliff / Undercliff Walk.

== See also ==
- List of waterfalls
- List of waterfalls in Australia
