= The Hummingbirds =

Australian indie/jangle pop band

- Origin: Sydney, New South Wales, Australia
- Genres: Indie pop, jangle pop
- Years active: 1986–1993, 2011, 2016, 2017
- Labels: Phantom, rooART, Polygram, Warner, IV, BMG
- Past members: refer to Members list below

The Hummingbirds were an Australian indie pop and jangle pop band from Sydney, who formed in 1986 from Bug Eyed Monsters. They were one of the most highly regarded outfits to emerge from Sydney's inner-city scene during the late 1980s and were an early signing to the rooArt label. The Hummingbirds' single "Blush" peaked at No. 19 on the ARIA singles charts in 1989. They left rooArt in 1992, and disbanded in 1993.

== Biography ==
The Hummingbirds formed in 1986 from the remnants of the short-lived band Bug Eyed Monsters. Band members originally comprised singer and guitarist Simon Holmes, bassist John Boyce and drummer Mark Temple, after a few months of initial rehearsals as a three-piece, vocalist and guitarist Alannah Russack signed on. In early 1987, Boyce departed and was replaced by singer and bassist Robyn St. Clare. They were one of Australia's most promising acts in the late 1980s and early 1990s, along with other up-and-comers like Ratcat, Clouds, Tall Tales and True and The Falling Joys.

They debuted in July 1987, with the single "Alimony", it was followed by three more singles, "Get On Down"/"Everything You Said" in January 1988, "Swim to Shore" in July and "Hindsight" in November. All four singles were released on the independent label, Phantom Records. All four singles were also re-issued by Phantom Records under the title Quatro in 1989.

The Hummingbirds signed to rooART in early 1989. They released their single "Blush" that August and it reached number one on the alternative music chart, and No. 19 on the ARIA singles charts. Their first album, loveBUZZ, produced by Mitch Easter, was released in 1989. and peaked at No. 31 on the ARIA album charts. It earned an American release, though sales were slow despite excellent reviews. In December 1989, Nic Dalton (The Plunderers) filled in on bass guitar as St. Clare, the regular bassist, took leave due to illness. Dalton left to join US alternative rock band The Lemonheads, The Hummingbirds had played support to The Lemonheads 1991 tour of Australia. Greg Atkinson, from the Ups and Downs and Big Heavy Stuff, also filled in on bass during 1991.

The Hummingbirds continued recording, releasing another album produced by Easter, April 1991's Va Va Voom, which peaked at No. 44 on the ARIA album charts. However, its release was delayed due to problems with RooArt. They were freed from their contract after the May 1992 release, "You Just Gotta Know My Mind", with Dalton again deputising for St. Clare – who was pregnant with her and Holmes' son Milo.

In 1993, The Hummingbirds made two EPs on the small independent label IV Recordings, Gone, (in February) and, Tail, (in July). The band found it hard to justify their move from a major label like rooART to the smaller IV Recordings, and broke up after the release of Tail. They played their final show on 11 December 1993, at the Central Club Hotel in (Richmond) Melbourne, featuring Holmes, Russack, St. Clare and Melder.

== Post break-up ==
Simon Holmes joined Her Name in Lights, which issued their debut album, Into the Light Again in October 2004. He then went on to record other albums with a new band, Fragile. Alannah Russack played in Sydney as a solo artist. Robyn St. Clare, whose composition "Into Your Arms" was a hit for The Lemonheads, has recorded with Ratcat. Mark Temple earned a PhD from the University of New South Wales, and now is a Senior Lecturer in Molecular Biology at Western Sydney University.

== Reunions ==
After 17 years, the band reformed for a reunion on 27 January 2011, for the Big Day Out festival in Sydney. The line-up featured Holmes, Temple and Russack, with St. Clare replaced on bass. The band followed the Big Day Out reunion show with some additional performances later that year;
Thursday 7 July 2011 – Simon Holmes and Alannah Russack (acoustic performance), Union Hotel, Newtown.
Saturday 17 September 2011 – full band at the Manning Bar, Sydney University. The day before the show at the Manning Bar, the band played a short set for "Live at the Loft" on 2SER radio and were also interviewed by DJ Andrew Khedoori. The line-up featured Holmes, Temple, Russack and Danny Yau on bass.

Along with The Falling Joys, the band reunited to play two shows on the 2nd and 3rd (matinee show) of July 2016 at the Newtown Social Club in Sydney (previously known as the Sandringham Hotel, Newtown). The line-up featured Holmes, Temple, Russack and Danny Yau again on bass.

The band played as part of a tribute concert to The Cure, celebrating the 25th anniversary of the release of The Cure album Wish. The gig took place at the Factory Theatre in Marrickville, Sydney, on 15 April 2017. This was the final concert of The Hummingbirds.

Simon Holmes died in Sydney in July 2017, at the age of 54. A tribute night featuring many bands was held for Simon Holmes on 3 December at the Factory Theater in Sydney. As part of the tribute night a limited edition, self-titled vinyl LP was released, combining all of the tracks from the band's last two EP's 'Gone' and 'Tail', which were originally released only on CD in 1993.

== Members ==
- John Boyce – bass guitar (1986–1987)
- Simon Holmes — vocals, guitar (1986–1993, 2011, 2016, 2017) (deceased)
- Mark Temple – drums (1986–1992, 2011, 2016, 2017)
- Alannah Russack – vocals, guitar (1986–1993, 2011, 2016, 2017)
- Robyn St. Clare – bass guitar (1987–1993)
- Shane Melder – drums (1992–1993)
- Nic Dalton — bass (1989–1991)
- Greg Atkinson – bass (1991)
- Danny Yau – bass (2011, 2016, 2017)

== Discography ==
=== Studio albums ===
| Year | Title | Peak chart positions |
| Year | Title | AUS |
|---|---|---|
| 1989 | loveBUZZ: Released: October 1989; Label: rooArt (838679); Format: CD, LP, Cassette | 31 |
| 1991 | Va Va Voom: Released: June 1991; Label: rooArt (848531); Format: CD, LP, Cassette | 44 |

=== Compilation albums ===
| Year | Title |
|---|---|
| 1989 | Quatro: Released: 1989; Label: Phantom Records (PH24/26/27/29); Format: 4x7-inch; Note: limited to 500 on coloured vinyl |
| 2001 | Greatest Hits: Released: September 2001; Label: rooArt, BMG Australia (7432187019); Format: CD |
| 2017 | The Hummingbirds: Released: 2017; Label: Blank (BRC 019); Format: LP; Note: compiling two 1993 EPs Gone and Tail |

=== Extended plays ===
| Year | Title |
|---|---|
| 1993 | Gone: Released: February 1993; Label: IV Recordings (IVR-003); Format: CD |
| 1993 | Tail: Released: July 1993; Label: IV Recordings (IVR-005); Format: CD |

=== Singles ===
| Year | Title | Peak chart positions | Album |
| Year | Title | AUS | Album |
|---|---|---|---|
| 1987 | "Alimony"/"Three in the Morning" | — | Quatro |
| 1988 | "Everything You Said"/"Get on Down" | — | Quatro |
| 1988 | "Swim to Shore"/"Be Careful" | — | Quatro |
| 1988 | "Hindsight"/"Dragged over the Coals" | — | Quatro |
| 1989 | "Blush" | 19 | loveBUZZ |
| 1989 | "Word Gets Around" | 72 | loveBUZZ |
| 1990 | "Alimony" (Note: "Alimony" was re-recorded in 1989 for the loveBUZZ album) | 79 | loveBUZZ |
| 1991 | "If a Vow" | 73 | Va Va Voom |
| 1991 | "2 Weeks with a Good Man in Niagara Falls" | 93 | Va Va Voom |
| 1992 | "You Just Gotta Know My Mind" | 81 | non-album single |

== Awards and nominations ==
=== ARIA Music Awards ===
The ARIA Music Awards is an annual awards ceremony that recognises excellence, innovation, and achievement across all genres of Australian music. They commenced in 1987.

| Year | Nominee / work | Award | Result | Ref. |
| 1990 | loveBUZZ | Best New Talent | Nominated | |
| 1990 | loveBUZZ | Breakthrough Artist - Album | Won | |
| 1990 | "Blush" | Breakthrough Artist - Single | Won | |
