= List of musical acts from Western Australia =

This is a list of Western Australian musicians, (artists and bands) from all genres.

Because of the relative isolation of the state and the capital city of Perth from the rest of Australia, band membership has often been characterised by associations with other bands in the region.

Band/artist	Period	Style/genre	Members	Associations
Adam Said Galore	1994–present	Indie rock	Andrew Ryan, Simon Stru, thers, Matt Maguire, Michael Lake, Geoff Symons	Mukaizake
Allegiance	1990–1997	Thrash metal	Tony Campo, Dave Harrison, Conrad Higson, Steve Hidden, Jason Stone, Glen Butcher, John Mihos	Black Steel
Allen, Christie	1962-1998	Pop, Disco		
Ammonia	1992–1999	Rock	Dave Johnstone, Alan Balmont, Simon Hensworth, Phil Natt	Hideous Goldsteins, Dear Octopus, Cherrytones
An Evening At Elmwood	2006-2009	Emo, Screamo, Post-Hardcore	Jamie Mallinder (nee Calabrese), Steve Caniglia, John Horner, Ben Broadley, Colyn Prater, Michael Chewter	
Antistatic	2003–2007	Hard rock		
Alexanda, Cristian		R&B		
B-Nasty	2009–present	Hip hop	Alexander James Ritchie Barnes	Dough Related Productions
Baby Animals	1989–1994, 2007–present	Rock	Suze DeMarchi, Dave Leslie, Eddie Parise, Frank Celensa	
Baker, James	1957-2025	Rock		The Victims, The Scientists, Hoodoo Gurus, Beasts of Bourbon, The Dubrovniks
The Bamboos	1984–1987	Alternative rock	Russel Hopkinson, Mark Gelmi, Craig Hallsworth, Greg Hitchcock	New Christs, Neptunes, You Am I
The Bank Holidays	2003–2012	Indie pop	Nat Carson, James Crombie, Wibekke Reczek, Stuart Leach	One Horse Town
Basement Birds	2009–2011	Indie rock	Kavyen Temperley, Steve Parkin, Kevin Mitchell, Josh Pyke	Eskimo Joe, Jebediah
Birds of Tokyo	2004–present	Alternative rock	Ian Kenny, Adam Spark, Glenn Sarangapany, Ian Berney, Adam Weston	Karnivool, Tragic Delicate
Bluetile Lounge	1991–1998, 2021–present		Gabrielle Cotton, Daniel Erickson, Howard Healy, Alex Stevens	
Bob Evans (Mitchell, Kevin)	1976(b)–present	Indie music		Jebediah
Bolleter, Ross		Improvised music		
Boys	1977–1983, 1987–1988	Hard rock	Brent Lucanus, Frank Celenza, Tony Celiberti, Camillo Del Roio, Lino Del Roio, Troy Newman, Eddie Parise, Roberto Salpietro	Baby Animals
The Blackeyed Susans	1989–present	Rock	Phil Kakulas, Rob Snarski, Mark Dawson	Chad's Tree, Martha's Vineyard, Kim Salmon and the Surrealists
The Bloods	2007-2010	punk	Steeve Demiris, Joe Byrne, Nat Pax, Sean Gill	
Break Even	2005-2016	Hardcore	Mark Bawden, Simon Dreja, Stefan Sciuto, Perri Basile, Ash Pederick, Rowan Willoughby	
Burke, Donna	1987–	Pop, Jazz		Ganime Jazz
Butler, John	1975(b)–	Bluegrass, Jam band		The John Butler Trio
Calerway	2005–2009	Indie rock	Jaun-Paul Rebola, Cameron Edwards, Phil O'Reilly, James Watroba	Saving Rushmore, Last Year's Hero
Cartman	1997–2003	Alternative rock	Joe Hawkins, Cain Turnley, Scott Nicholls, Ben Mills	The Avenues
Carus and The True Believers	1995–present	Folk/Country/Reggae/Rock	Carus Thompson, Jason McGann, John Bedggood, Mathieu Lucas	The John Butler Trio, Eskimo Joe
Cat Hope	1996–present	Noise music		Lux Mammoth, Gata Negra
Chad's Tree	1983–1989	Rock	Mark Snarski, Rob Snarski, Jason Kain, James Hurst	The Go-Betweens, The Jackson Code, Blackeyed Susans, Holy Rollers
Charlotte's Web	1986–1991	Indie pop	Jeff Lowe, Flick Dear, Kym Skipworth, Laurie Mansell, Michael Zampogna	Bob's Love Child, Indian Givers, Wild Honey
Che'Nelle	1983(b)–present	R&B		
The Chemist	2007–2013	Alternative rock	Ben Witt, Elliot Smith, James Ireland, Hamish Rahn	
Chaos Divine	2005–present	Progressive rock / Progressive metal	Dave Anderton, Simon Mitchell, Ryan Felton, Mike Kruit, Ben Mazarol	
Cinema Prague	1989–1998, 2007, 2009–present	Alternative rock Post-grunge	Rex Horan (left 1998), George Kailis, Tim Wheeler, Roy Matinez	Air Ensemble
College Fall	2004–present	Indie pop	Glenn Musto, Jodie Bartlett	Showbag!, The Nordeens, Josivac
Coterie	2016-present	Reggae Rock	Tyler Fisher, Joshua Fisher, Brandford Fisher, Conrad Fisher	
Crooked Colours	2013-present	Dance, Electronic	Leon Debaughn, Liam Merrett-Park	
Crawlspace	1998–present	Rock	Russell Smith, Matt Franklin, Travis Franklin, Joe Sivak	
Cypher	1998–present	Post rock	Sebastian Parsons, Alec Monger, Sam Pugsley	
Natalie D-Napoleon	2006–present	Alternative country	Natalie D-Napoleon, Kenny Edwards, Dan Phillips	Flavour of the Month, Bloom, The Jayco Brothers
Davis, Cassie	2008–present	Pop		
DeMarchi, Suze	1964(b)–present	Rock, Pop		Baby Animals
The Decline	2005–present	Punk rock, Skate Punk	Pat Decline, Harry, Ben Elliott, Ray Ray	Dan Cribb & The Isolated
De Vito, Cosima	1976(b)–present	Pop, R&B		Australian Idol contestant
DICE	2020-present	Indie Rock	Ben Hodge, Sam Barrett-Lennard, Tom King, Regan Beazley	
Diesel	1991-present	Rock, Soul, Blues	Mark Lizzotte	Johnny Diesel & the Injectors, Innocent Bystanders
Donnelly, Stella	2016-present	Indie Folk		Bells Rapids, Boat Show
Downsyde	1996–present	Australian Hip-hop	Optamus, Dazastah, Dyna-Mikes, DJ Armee, Cheeky, Hi-Hat	Syllabolix Crew
Drapht (Ridge, Paul)	1998–present	Australian Hip-hop		Syllabolix Crew
The Drones	2000–2016	Rock	Gareth Liddiard, Fiona Kitschin, Dan Luscombe, Michael Noga	
The Dugites	1978–1984	Indie pop	Lynda Nutter, Peter Crosbie, Paul Noonan, Clarance Bailey	
Dyscord	2002-2010	metalcore		
Effigy	1994-1998		Peter Hardman, Cobina Crawford, Jason Stacey, Pete Twibey, Rob Terriacca, Michael Boddington, Brodie and Justin Kahl	
Eleventh He Reaches London	2002-2016	Post-hardcore, Progressive Rock, Metalcore	Ian Lenton, Jayden Worts, Jeremy Martin, Mark Donaldson, Craig McElhinney, Luke Pollard	
Elora Danan	2006–2009	Alternative rock	George Green, Isaac Kara, Ryan Smith, Tim Marley, Matthew Thomas, Jay Rendle O’Shea	
End Of Fashion	2004–present	Rock	Justin Burford, Rodney Aravena, Simon Fasolo	The Sleepy Jackson
Eskimo Joe	1997–present	Alternative rock	Kavyen Temperley, Stuart MacLeod, Joel Quartermain	
Euroclydon	1975	Heavy Rock	Bernie Costa, Phil North, Vince Crear, Ricky Faulds	Stratosphere, Jim Stewart (Ezra Pound)
Eurogliders	1980–1989, 2005–2007, 2013–present	Post Punk, New Wave, Pop	Bernie Lynch, Amanda Vincent, Grace Knight, Ron François, Crispin Akerman, John Bennetts	
The Faim	2014-present	Pop Rock	Josh Raven, Stephen Beerkens, Samuel Tye, Linden Marissen	
Faith in Plastics	2002–present	Indie pop	Adam Livingston, Rhys Davies, Vaughan Davies, Dave Holley	
Faulkner, Dave	1957(b)–present			The Victims, The Manikins, Hoodoo Gurus, Antenna, Persian Rugs
The Fergusons	1999–2005	Alternative rock	Al Nistelberger, Grant Joyce, Wayne Beadon, Matt Wheeler, Mike Bruce	Bipolar Bears
The Flairz	2004–present	Garage rock	John Mariani, Scarlett Stevens, Dion Mariani, Georgia Wilkinson Derums	
found: quantity of sheep	2001–2005	Experimental rock	Trent Barrett, Neil Rabinowitz, Michael Winlo, Cam Barrett	
Fourth Floor Collapse	1989–present	Indie rock	Mat Brooker, Dan Forrestal, Rhys Kealley, Michael Miller, Michael Parker	
Full Scale	1998–2005	Alternative metal	Ezekiel Ox, Jimmy Tee, Tristan Ross, Chris Frey, Nic Frey	Helmut
Gaunt, Nathan	1999-present	Folk rock		Nathan Gaunt & the Blackeyed Dogs
Geneve, Carla	2017-present	Indie Rock		Sly Withers
Go-Jo	1995-present	Pop	Marty Zambotto	
Great Gable	2014-present	Indie Rock	Alex Whiteman, Matt Preen, Chris Bye	
The Groovesmiths	2004–present	Roots	Gavin Shoesmith, Alex Drew, Matthew Wright	John Butler Trio
GUM	2014-present	Psych Rock	Jay Watson	Tame Impala, Pond, Ambrose Kenny-Smith, The Novocaines
Gyroscope	1997–present	Post-grunge/Alternative rock	Daniel Sanders, Zoran Trivic, Brad Campbell, Rob Nassif	
Halogen	1998–present	Rock	Jasmine Lee, Frans Bisschops, Ben Crooke, Rob Maszkowski, Trent Dhue	
The Hampdens	2003–present	Indie rock	Susannah Legge, Gavin Crawcour, Jules Hewitt	
Harlequin League	2007–present	Indie rock	Seb Astone, James Rogers, Ben Pooley, Myles Davis	
Harris, Rolf	1953–2014	Novelty, folk		
Haywood, Leah	1976(b)–present			
Header	1993–1997	Indie pop/Power pop	Brad Bolton, Dave Chadwick, Liam Coffey, Ian Freeman, Dean Willoughby	The Rainyard, The Mars Bastards
Helicopters	1980–1985	New wave/Ska	Deidre Baude, Kevin Rooney, Phil Bennett, Peter Stafford, Tony Thewlis, George O'Brien, Vic Renolds	The Scientists
Heavy Weight Champ	1999–present	Heavy metal, Progressive rock	Grant McCulloch, Dean Miller, Luke Copeland	
Hole, Dave	1948(b)–present	Blues		
Institut Polaire	2004–2011	Indie	Ben Blakeney, Ash Blakeney, Elliott Brannen, Catherine Colvin, Erik Hecht, Rebecca May, David Thirkettle-Watts, Samantha Wass	The Autumn Isles, Jack On Fire
Innocent Bystanders	1983–1988	Rock	Brett Keyser, Mark Lizotte, Bernie Bremond, John Dalzell, John Heussanstamm, Al Kash, Cliff Kinneen, Jamie Manifis, Yak Sherritt, Dave Skewes, Brett Townshend	Johnny Diesel and the Injectors, Brett Keyser, Diesel
INXS (as The Farriss Brothers)	1977–present	Rock	Michael Hutchence (d.1997), Kirk Pengilly, Gary Beers, Andrew Farriss, Tim Farriss, Jon Farriss, J. D. Fortune	
Jade, Samantha	1987(b)–present	Pop, Contemporary R&B		
Jebediah	1994–present	Alternative rock	Kevin Mitchell, Chris Daymond, Vanessa Thornton, Brett Mitchell	
The John Butler Trio	1995–present	Jam band, Bluegrass	John Butler, Shannon Birchall, Michael Barker	
Johnny Diesel & the Injectors	1986–1991	Rock, Soul	Mark Lizzotte, Bernie Bremend, John Dalzell, George Dalstrom, John Sherritt	Diesel, Innocent Bystanders
Karnivool	1996–present	Progressive rock	Ian Kenny, Andrew Goddard, Jon Stockman, Mark Hosking, Steve Judd	Birds of Tokyo
Kay, Georgi	2010-present	Indie Pop, Electronic		
The Kill Devil Hills	2003–present	Blues-rock	Brendon Humphries, Steve Joines, Steve Gibson, Alex Archer, Ryan Dux	Felicity Groom and the Black Black Smoke
Koi Child	2014-2018	Hip Hop, Jazz	Shannon Cruz Patterson, Blake Hart, Christian Ruggiero, Jamie Canny, Sam Newman, Tom Kenny, Yann Vissac	Kashikoi, Child's Play
The Kryptonics	1985–1992	Pop punk, Alternative rock	Ian Underwood, Peter Kostic, Tony Rushan, Richard Corey	Front End Loader, The Chevelles, You Am I, Regurgitator
Lamb, Alan		Sound art		
Lash	1996–2003	Alternative rock	Belinda-Lee Reid, Jaclyn Pearson, Jessicca Bennett, Micaela Slayford	Exteria, Spencer Tracy, The Preytells
Layla Hanbury (MC Layla)	1982(b)–present	Australian Hip-hop		Syllabolix Crew
Little Birdy	2002–present	Indie rock	Katy Steele, Simon Leach, Scott O'Donoghue, Matt Chequer	The Sleepy Jackson, End of Fashion
Martine Locke	1996-2000	Folk rock	Martine Locke	The Velvet Janes
Love Pump	1985–1992	Alternative rock	Rodney Glick, Peter Hadley, Trevor Hilton, Thomas Kayser, Val Tarin	The Waltons, The Fat
Lo-Key Fu	2000–present	Breakbeat, Nu skool breaks	Dave Jeavons	Brainchild, Rollerskates, Sock, Spicy Baby Tomatoes, Wampus
McComb, David	1962(b)–1999(d)			The Triffids, The Blackeyed Susans, Red Pony
Mach Pelican	1996–2007	Punk rock	K-Rock, Atsu Longrun, Toshi-8Beat	
Make Them Suffer	2008–Present	Metalcore/Deathcore	Sean Harmanis, Nick McLernon, Lachlan Monty, Chris Arias-Real, Tim Madden, Louisa Burton	Roadrunner Australia
The Manikins	1977–1984	Protopunk/New wave	Robbie Porritt, Neil Fernandes, Dan Dare, Mark Betts, Brad Clark	The Scientists, Hoodoo Gurus
Martha's Vineyard	1986–1990	Folk/rock	Peggy Van Zalm, Anthony Best, Norman Parkhill, Lisa Jooste, Catherine McAuliffe, Aidan D'Adhemar	The Blackeyed Susans
Matty B (Mathew Barrett)	2000–present	Australian Hip-hop		Syllabolix Crew
May, Abbe	2000-present	Rock		The Fuzz
Methyl Ethel	2013-present	Art Rock	Jake Webb	
Miles Away	2002–present	Hardcore Punk	Nick Horsnell, Adam Crowe, Cam Jose, Colton Vaughan Jolliffe, Chris Unsworth	
Monks of Mellonwah	2009-	Alternative rock		
Mucky Duck Bush Band	1974–	folk music	John Perry, Don Blue, Eric Kowarski, Bob Emery	
Murphy, Chris	1976(b)–present	Rock		Australian Idol contestant, Murphy's Lore
Murphy, Courtney	1979(b)–present	Rock		Australian Idol contestant, Murphy's Lore
New Rules for Boats	2004–present	Indie pop	Sean Pollard, Benjamin Golby, Miranda Pollard, Joseph Derwort, Dan Grant	
Not Enough Rope	1994–2001	Folk, Rock music	Matt Galligan, Matt Kealley, Todd Lynch, Mike Lane, Steve Bow	
The Novocaines	2006-2015	Rock	Corey Marriott, Jay Marriott, Steve Turnock, Liam Young, Jim Power, Jay Watson	Tame Impala, GUM
Old Mervs	2017-Present	Surf Rock	David House, Henry Carrington-Jones	
The Panics	2002–present	Rock music	Jae Laffer, Drew Wootton, Myles Wootton, Paul Otway, Julian Douglas	
The Panda Band	2003–present	Indie pop	Damian Crosbie, David Namour, Stephen Callan, Chris Callan, Gabriel Nicotra	Rollerskates
Pendulum	2002–2014	Drum and Bass	Rob Swire, Gareth McGrillen, Paul Harding	
The Pigram Brothers	1996–present	Folk	Alan Pigram, Steven Pigram, David Pigram, Colin Pigram, Gavin Pigram, Phillip Pigram, Peter Pigram	Scrap Metal
Pond	2008–present	Psychedelic rock, Psychedelic pop	Kevin Parker, Nick Allbrook, Jay Watson, Joseph Ryan, Jamie Terry, Cameron Avery	Tame Impala, Mink Mussel Creek, Space Lime Peacock, Giant Tortoise, Allbrook/Avery, The Dee Dee Dums, Gum, The Silents
The Preytells	2004–present	Rock	Simon Okely, Jessicca Bennett, Jaclyn Pearson, Cameron Stewart	Spencer Tracy, Lash
Psychedelic Porn Crumpets	2014-present	Psych Rock	Jack McEwan, Luke Parish, Danny Caddy, Chris Young, Jamie Reynolds	
Radarmaker	2000–present	Art rock	Warwick Hall, Adam Trainer, Noah Norton, Wendi Graham	
Red Jezebel	1997–present	Alternative rock	Paul Wood, Dave Parkin, Mark Cruickshank, Alex Hyman	Plutonic Girl
Rhibosome	1998–2004	Electronic	Dave McKinney, Clayton Chipper, Andrew Selmes, George Nikoloudis, Chad Hedley	Flow Dynamics, Soul Harmonics
Rollerskates	1999–present	Indie pop, Rock, Australian Hip-hop, Electronic	Jordan Johnston, David Namour, Stephen Callan, Gabriel Nicotra, Leigh Johnston, Dave Jeavons	The Panda Band, Lo-Key Fu
Rupture	1980s-2001	Hardcore	Gus Chamber, Dick Diamond, Stumbles, Zombo	
Russian Winters	2006-2021	Indie Rock	Kris Dimitroff, Rob Stephens, Trent Dhue, John Clark, Pete Evans	
Kim Salmon and the Surrealists	1987–1999, 2006	Alternative rock	Kim Salmon, Stu Thomas, Phil Collings	The Scientists, The Beasts of Bourbon, Kim Salmon and the Business, Antenna, Darling Downs, Salamander Jim
San Cisco	2009–present	Indie Pop	Jordi Davieson, Josh Biondillo, Nick Gardner, Scarlett Stevens	The Flairz
Saritah		World music		
Schvendes	2002–present	Alternative	Rachael Dease, Tristen Parr, Greg Hosking, Tara John, Ant Gray	Fall Electric
The Scientists	1978–1987, 1995, 2006	Alternative rock	Kim Salmon, Boris Sujdovic, Tony Thewlis, Leanne Chock	Hoodoo Gurus, Kim Salmon and the Surrealists, The Beasts of Bourbon, The Dubrovniks
Scott, Bon	1946(b)–1980(d)	Hard rock		The Spektors, The Valentines, Fraternity, AC/DC
Scrap Metal	1983-1995	Reggae		Pigram Brothers
Selwyn	1982(b)–present	R&B		
ShockOne	2005-present	Drum and Bass	Karl Thomas	Pendulum
The Silents	2003–present	Alternative rock, Psychedelic rock	James Terry, Benjamin Stowe, Sam Ford, Alex Board	Pond
Sivan, Troye	2006–present	Pop, synth-pop, electropop, dance-pop		
The Sleepy Jackson	1998–present	Alternative rock, Baroque pop	Luke Steele, Malcolm Clark, Lee Jones, Dave Symes, Felix Bloxsom	End of Fashion, Eskimo Joe, Spencer Tracy, Little Birdy
Sly Withers	2013-present	Punk, Indie Rock	Jono Mata, Sam Blitvich, Shea Moriarty, Fraser Cringle, Joel Neubecker	
Slumberjack	2013–present	Electronic music / Trap	Morgan Then, Fletcher Ehlers	
Snowman	2003–present	Alternative rock	Andy Citawarman, Joseph McKee, Olga Hermanniusson, Ross DiBlasio	
Sodastream	1997–2007	Rock	Pete Cohen, Karl Smith, Adam Johnson	Thermos Cardy
The Someloves	1986–1990	Alternative rock	Dom Mariani, Darryl Mather, Tony Italiano, Robbie Scorer, Martin Moon	The Stems, Lime Spiders, The Orange Humble Band, DM3, Dom Mariani and the Majestic Kelp
Sons of Rico	2004-present	Indie Rock	Alex MacRae, Nigel Moyes, Siobhan McGinnity, Terry Mann	
The Southern River Band	2012–present	Rock	Callum Kramer, Anton Dindar, Jason Caniglia, Carlo Romeo	
South Summit	2020-present	Indie Rock	Josh Trindall, Nathan Osborne, Isaiah Reuben, Nehemiah Reuben, Fynn Samorali	
Spacey Jane	2016–present	Indie rock, Garage rock	Ashton Hardman-Le Cornu, Caleb Harper, Kieran Lama, Peppa Lane	
Split Seconds	2010-present	Indie Pop		
The Spektors	1964–1966	Rock	Bon Scott, Brian Gannon, Wyn Milson, John Collins	The Valentines, The Winstons, AC/DC
Spencer Tracy	1999–2004	Rock	Kim Jones, Shaun Sibbes, Jessicca Bennett	The Sleepy Jackson, Astronaut, The Preytells, The Avenue, Eskimo Joe
Steele, Katy	1983(b)–present			Little Birdy
Steele, Luke				The Sleepy Jackson, Nations by the River, Empire of the Sun
The Stems	1983–1987, 2003, 2007		Dom Mariani, Richard Lane, Julian Mathews, David Shaw	The Someloves, The Chevelles, DM3, Dom Mariani and the Majestic Kelp, The Neptunes
Subtruck	1998–present	Hard rock	Phil Bradley, Kris Goodwin, Robert Troup	
Sugar Army	2005–Present	Rock	Patrick McLaughlin, Todd Honey, Ian Berney, Jamie Sher	
Supernaut	1974–1980, 2007	Glam rock, glam punk, punk rock, new wave	Gary Twinn, Chris Burnham, Joe Burnham, Philip Foxman	Illustrated Man, The Saints, Twenty Flight Rockers, Knock-Out Drops, The Honeydippers, Speedtwinn, The International Swingers
Tallis, Steve	1952-	Blues		
Ta-Ku	2008-present	Hip Hop, R&B	Regan Matthews	
Tall Tales and True	1983-1999	Alternative Rock	Matthew de la Hunty, Paul Miskin, Dave Rashleigh, Simon Alcorn	
Tame Impala	2007–present	Psychedelic rock	Kevin Parker, Jay Watson, Dominic Simper, Nick Allbrook	Pond, Mink Mussel Creek, Space Lime Peacock, Giant Tortoise, Allbrook/Avery, The Dee Dee Dums, Gum, Melody's Echo Chamber, The Flaming Lips, Koi Child
Thomas, Stu	1989–present	Alternative rock	Stu Thomas	The Stu Thomas Paradox, Stu & The Celestials, Dave Graney, Dave Graney & Clare Moore feat. The Lurid Yellow Mist, Kim Salmon and the Surrealists, The Scientists, Kim Salmon and the Business, The Brass Bed, Luxedo, Billy Miller, Organism, Crumpet, Barb Waters, Dan Brodie and the Broken Arrows, Red Lantern, Soldiers, Jane Dust
Tired Lion	2010-present	Grunge	Sophie Hopes, Ethan Darnell, Matt Tanner, Nick Vasey	Violent Soho
The Triffids	1979–1989	Rock, Alternative, Folk rock	David McComb (d. 1999), Robert McComb, Jill Birt, Alsy MacDonald, Martyn P. Casey, Graham Lee	The Blackeyed Susans, Red Ponies, Nick Cave and the Bad Seeds, Grinderman
Tucker B's	1994–present	Rock	Matt Rudas, Andrew Houston, Darren Nuttall, Matt Maguire	Adam Said Galore
Turnstyle	1995–present		Adem K, Paul Fanning, Dean Davies, Todd Griffiths	The Burton Cool Suit, When The Sky Fell, The Community Chest
The Valentines	1966–1970	Rock	Vince Lovegrove, Bon Scott, Ted Ward, John Cooksey, Paddy Beach	AC/DC, The WinZtons, The Spektors
The Victims	1977–1979	Punk rock	Dave Faulkner, James Baker, Dave Cardwell	The Hoodoo Gurus, The Scientists
Voyager	1999–present	Progressive metal	Daniel Estrin, Simone Dow, Scott Kay, Ashley Doodkorte, Alex Canion	
V Capri	1984–1989	New wave	Tod Johnston, Damian Ward, Alan Simpson, Lance Karapetcoff, Michael O'Brien, Clint Arnold	
The Waifs	1992–present	Folk rock	Josh Cunningham, Donna Simpson, Vikki Thorn	
Warner, Dave	1953(b)–present			Pus, From The Suburbs
Will Stoker and the Embers	2006–present	Rock/Punk rock	Will Stoker, Ashley Doodkorte, Kynan Tan, Gareth Bevan, Tahlia Palmer, Benjamin Roberts	
Kevin Bloody Wilson	1947(b)–present	Comedy singer		Dennis Bryant and the Country Club
Yabu Band	2006–present	Desert rock/Reggae	Delson Stokes, Boyd Stokes, Jade Masters	
Yunyu	1980(b)–present	Roots		
Ziggy Ramo	2016-present	Hip Hop		

== See also ==
- Music of Perth
