= Southbound (festival) =

Australian music festival (2005–2016)

- Little Birdy performing at Southbound
- Genre: Rock, hip hop, electronic, indie
- Dates: Early January
- Locations: Busselton, Western Australia, Australia
- Years active: 2005–2016
- Website: southboundfestival.com.au

Southbound was an arts, camping and music festival. A variety of Australian and international artists performed at this event. The festival occurred annually around New Year at the Sir Stewart Bovell Park in Busselton, Western Australia.

== History ==
Southbound began as a single-day music festival in 2005, located at Sir Stewart Bovell Park in Busselton, Western Australia. In 2006, the event expanded, allowing festival-goers to camp on the festival grounds. In 2007, campers were allowed to camp the night before the festival, with special acoustic performances that same night. The 2010 event expanded into a 3-day festival for campers (2 days for non-campers).

The 2016 event was cancelled the night before the event after bushfires in the Waroona area closed both the South Western Highway and Forrest Highway, causing traffic to detour between Perth and Busselton. Main Roads Western Australia advised organisers that the only viable alternative route may also be restricted. After requests from patrons, event organisers made arrangements to allow ticket refunds to be donated to relief efforts and also donated food intended for catering at Southbound to bushfire relief. The festival was partly revived as a bush-fire benefit concert held at the Perth High Performance Centre on 10 January.

The event was rested in 2017. Some fans hoped it might come back in 2018, but the organisers moved on to other projects.

== The Event ==
=== ArtBound ===
ArtBound started at Southbound 2006, as a showcase of works from the local art community.

=== EcoBound ===
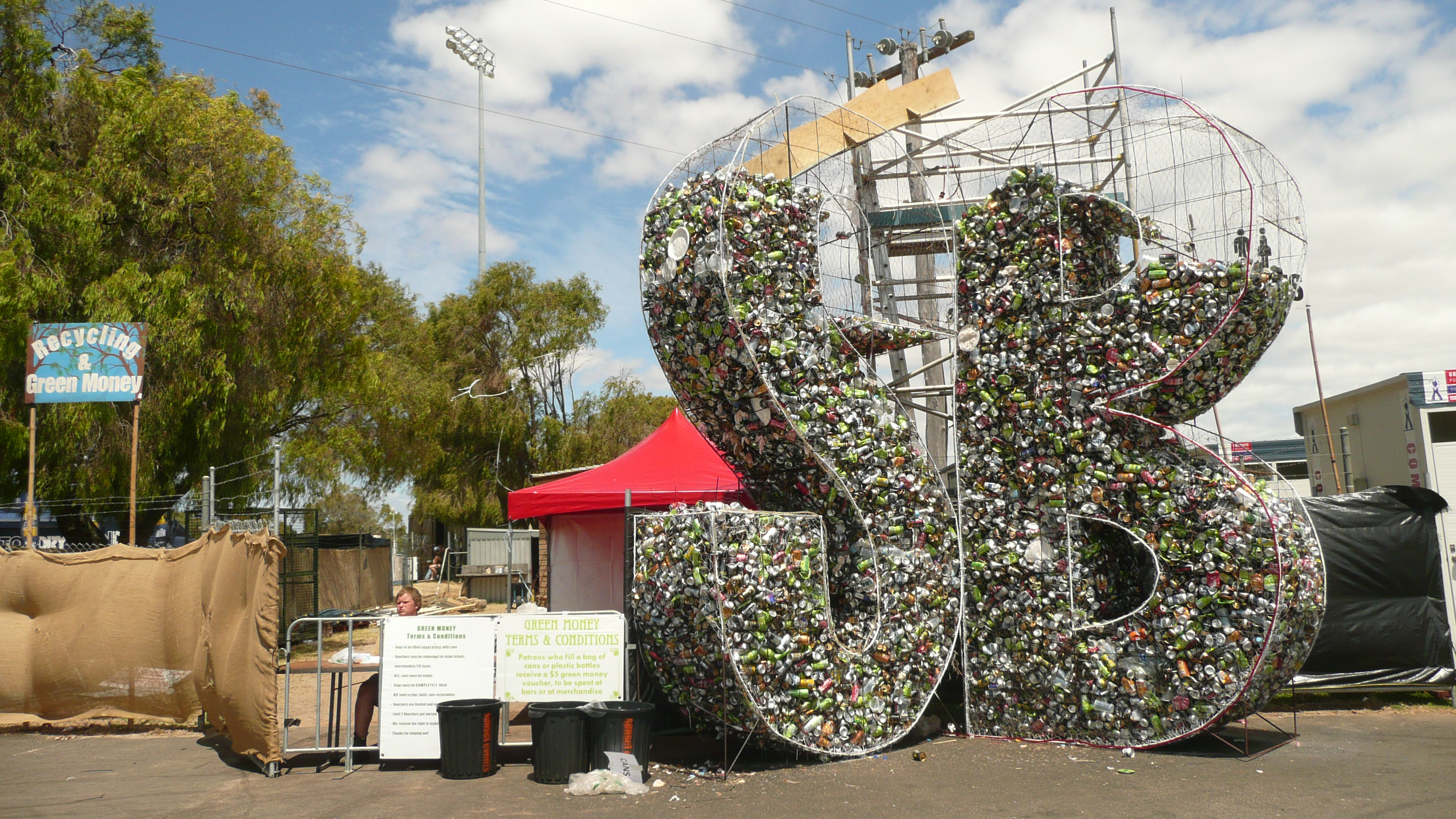
Southbound 2014 offered incentives for attendees to help collect recycling and displayed the results in an art installation.

EcoBound displayed how recyclable materials and alternative energy were implemented to reduce the festival's environmental impact. Solar power and biodiesel were used to meet energy needs.

=== StageBound ===
StageBound allowed unsigned artists to perform at Southbound. A requirement of these artists was that they were from the south west regional areas of Western Australia.

== Artist lineup by year ==
=== 2005 ===
Sunday 2 January 2005:

Pete Murray, Regurgitator, Eskimo Joe, Machine Gun Fellatio, The Thrills, Little Birdy, Wolfmother, Veruca Salt, Koolism, Rhibosome, Bodyjar, James De La Cruz, Sharif Galal, Dakota Star, The Panda Band, Spencer Tracy, The Fuzz, Red Jezebel, Phil’s Finest Hour

=== 2006 ===
Monday 2 January 2006:

The Dandy Warhols, Ozomatli, Ian Brown, Hoodoo Gurus, Pete Murray, Xavier Rudd, Butterfingers, The Shins, Downsyde, End Of Fashion, The Beautiful Girls, Eric Bibb, Katalyst, Dexter, Dallas Crane, The Grates, True Live, The Panics, TZU, The Vasco Era, Fdel, Sharif Galal, Dan Stinton, Dan The Man, Adima, Em Dee, As a Weapon

=== 2007 ===
2007 Southbound promotional poster

Friday 5 January 2007:

John Butler Trio, Michael Franti, Matt Costa, The Audreys, Blue King Brown & Dallas Frasca.

Saturday 6 January 2007:

John Butler Trio, Michael Franti, Matt Costa, The Audreys, The Preytells, Blue King Brown, Dallas Frasca, Wolfmother, Basement Jaxx, Modest Mouse, Eskimo Joe, Hilltop Hoods, The Bees, Scribe, You Am I, Jamie Lidell, Saul Williams, The Sleepy Jackson, Little Birdy, Youth Group, The Presets, The Black Seeds, Josh Pyke, Infusion, The Vasco Era, The Panda Band, The Exploders & The Flairz.

=== 2008 ===
Friday 4 January 2008:

The Waifs, The Beautiful Girls, Lior, Angus and Julia Stone and Institut Polaire

Saturday 5 January 2008:

The Words Kings of Leon, Black Rebel Motorcycle Club, Groove Armada, The Waifs, The Go! Team, José González, Built to Spill, Blackalicious, Girl Talk, Gotye, Lior, Midnight Juggernauts, Neville Staple’s Specials, The Mess Hall, Angus and Julia Stone, The Beautiful Girls, Spiderbait, Augie March, Regurgitator, The Pipettes, Bonde Do Role, Operator Please, Institut Polaire, Mattafix, The Herd, The Panics & The Dirty Secrets.

=== 2009 ===
First announcement 13 August.

Friday 2 January 2009:

The Hives, Pete Murray, Architecture In Helsinki, Donavon Frankenreiter, Birds of Tokyo, Bliss n Eso, Bluejuice, End of Fashion, TZU, Wolf & Cub, Grafton Primary, The Drones, Drapht, South Rakkas Crew, C. W. Stoneking, The Autumn Isles and Harlequin League. Liam Finn was a late withdrawal from the lineup.

Saturday 3 January 2009:

Franz Ferdinand, The Kooks, The Cat Empire, Pete Murray, Sharon Jones and the Dap Kings, Santogold, Gomez, Tegan And Sara, Faker, The Grates, Blue King Brown, Karnivool, Atmosphere featuring Brother Ali, A-Trak, Eli 'Paperboy' Reed and the True Loves, Jamie Lidell, Mystery Jets, Lykke Li, Murs, SoKo, Late of the Pier, Ash Grunwald, Cut Off Your Hands, Dash and Will, Violent Soho, Tame Impala, The John Steel Singers, The Shiny Brights and Will stoker and the embers. Pete Murray was the only artist to perform on both Friday and Saturday.

=== 2010 ===
First announcement 6 August.

Yeah Yeah Yeahs, Moby, Hilltop Hoods, Grizzly Bear, Xavier Rudd, Rodrigo y Gabriella, Editors, Paul Dempsey, The Temper Trap, Sarah Blasko, Midnight Juggernauts, Little Birdy, Major Lazer (Sound System), Seasick Steve, Emiliana Torrini, White Rabbits, Chairlift, Art vs. Science, Yves Klein Blue, Urthboy, Liam Finn, Andrew Bird, Lisa Mitchell, Lyrics Born, The View, Future Of The Left, Kaki King, Patrick Watson, King Khan & The Shrines, DJ Yoda, Philadelphia Grand Jury, One Tiger Down plus more to be announced.

=== 2011 ===
MGMT Interpol, Joan Jett and the Blackhearts, The National, The Living End, Public Enemy, Klaxons, Angus and Julia Stone, Tame Impala, The Rapture, Ladyhawke, Cold War Kids, Sleigh Bells, Peaches, Hot Hot Heat, 6s and 7s, A-Trak, Ash Grunwald, Chris Baio (Vampire Weekend), Beardyman, Big Scary, Birds of Tokyo, Bliss N Eso, Boom! Bap! Pow!, Boy & Bear, Carus Thompson, Casiokids, Charlie Parr, Children Collide, Cloud Control. Daara J, Dan Kelly, Dan Sultan, Edan the Dee-Jay, Eskimo Joe, Ghost Hotel, Grace Woodroofe, Jamaica, Jonathan Boulet, Junip, Kitty Daisy and Lewis, Marina and the Diamonds, Muscles, Paul Kelly, Pond, Sally Seltmann, Sampology, Scotch of St James, Split Seconds, The Bamboos, The Beautiful Girls, The Brow Horn Orchestra, The Chemist, The Chevelles, The Cool Kids, The Cuban Brothers, The Growl, The Jezabels, The Middle East, The Morning Benders, The Novocaines, The Silents, The Soft Pack, Tijuana Cartel, Tim and Jean, Washington, World's End Press, Yacht Club DJs, Young Revelry, Kimbra, An Horse, CSS, The Head and the Heart and John Butler Trio.

=== 2012 ===
Saturday 7 January 2012:

Aloe Blacc, An Horse, Arctic Monkeys, Arj Barker, Beirut, Crystal Castles, Dr. Don Don, Dub FX, Grouplove, Hook N Sling, Jim Jones Revue, Josh Pyke, Kimbra, Lanie Lane, Miles Kane, Papa vs Pretty, Regurgitator, The Grates, The Head and the Heart, The Naked and Famous, Tijuana Cartel, Totally Enormous Extinct Dinosaurs, DJ Yoda, Young MC. Julian Casablancas

Sunday 8 January 2012:

Alpine, Bass Kleph, CANT, CSS, Dan Deacon, Drapht, Emma Louise, Fleet Foxes, John Butler Trio, Josh Thomas, Metronomy, Missy Higgins, Nina Las Vegas, PNAU, Q-Bik, Shockone, Split Seconds, The Jezabels, The Kooks, The Vines, Tim Finn, Unknown Mortal Orchestra.

=== 2013 ===
The Flaming Lips, The Vaccines, The Hives, Bombay Bicycle Club, First Aid Kit, Hilltop Hoods, Beach House, Best Coast, Millions, Maxïmo Park, Hot Chip, Totally Enormous Extinct Dinosaurs, SBTRKT, Boy And Bear, Coolio,

=== 2014 ===
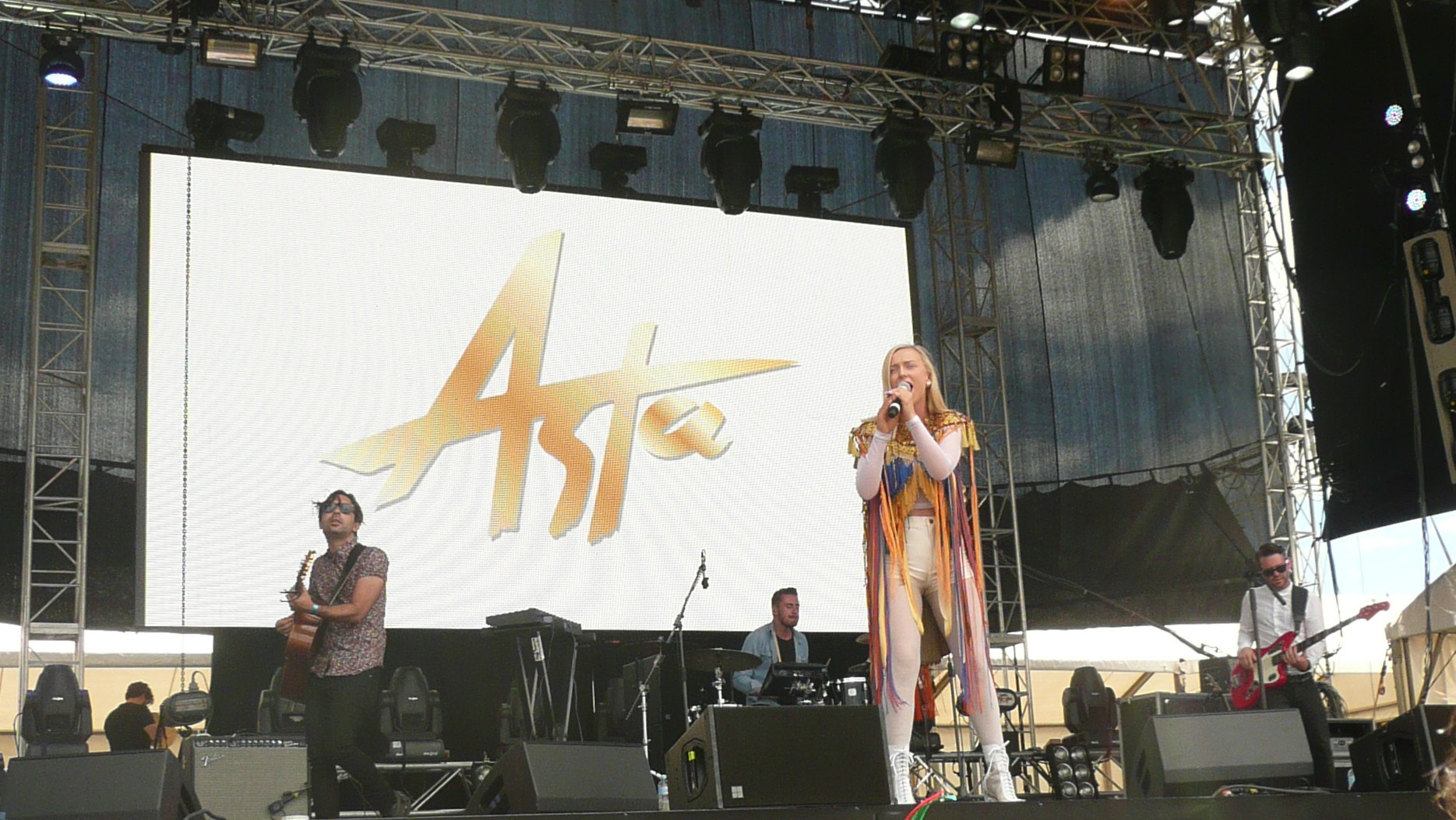
Asta onstage

Friday 3 January 2014 - Saturday 4 January 2014:

MGMT !!! (Chk Chk Chk), Asta, Big Scary, Bombino, Bonobo, Chet Faker, Crystal Fighters, Emma Louise, Flight Facilities, Gossling, Grizzly Bear, Hanni El Khatib, Hermitude, Horrorshow, Hungry Kids Of Hungary, James Vincent McMorrow, Johnny Marr, London Grammar, Mgmt, Neil Finn, Oliver Tank, Pond, RUFUS, Solange, The Cat Empire, The Paper Kites, The Preatures, The Roots, The Rubens, The War On Drugs, The Wombats, Thundamentals, Tom Odell, Vampire Weekend, Violent Femmes, Violent Soho, White Denim.

=== 2015 ===
Saturday 3 Jan 2015 - Sunday 4 January 2015

Alison Wonderland, alt-J, Apache (Stagebound Winner), The Black Lips, Bluejuice, Cold War Kids, Crooked Colours, DMA's, Empire of the Sune, George Ezra, Glass Animals, Jagwar Ma, Jamie XX, Joey Bada$$, John Butler Trio, Julian Casablancas & The Voids, Kim Churchill, The Kite String Tangle, KLP (DJ Set), La Roux, Methyl Ethyl, Milky Chance, Movement, The Presets, Remi, Run The Jewels, Safia, Salt N Pepa, SBTRKT, Slumberjack, Spiderbait, Sticky Fingers, The Temper Trap, Tkay Maidza, Todd Terje (live), Tycho, Vance Joy, Wolf Alice

=== 2016 ===
The 2016 Southbound Music Festival was cancelled due to bushfires that cut off access to the venue. It was partly revived as a bush-fire benefit concert held at the Perth High Performance Centre on 10 January. Bands that appeared included Bloc Party, San Cisco, Koi Child and Birds of Tokyo. Disc jockey sets were played by Disclosure, Django Django and Oh Wonder.
