= Peter Hadley (disambiguation) =

Peter Hadley was a politician.

Peter Hadley may also refer to:

- Peter Hadley, character in Humboldt County (film)
- Peter Hadley, musician in Love Pump
