= Slow Turismo =

Australian indie pop band

- Origin: Canberra, Australian Capital Territory, Australia
- Genre: Indie pop
- Years active: 2014–present
- Spinoff of: Rubycon
- Members: Max Conway; Riley Conway; Sam Conway; Louis Montgomery
- Past members: Rhys Lintern
- Website: facebook.com/pg/slowturismo/

Slow Turismo are an Australian indie pop band from Canberra, which were formed in 2015. The three Conway brothers: Sam (vocals, guitar), Max (vocals, guitar) and Riley (drums), were all previously members of an indie and alternative rock quartet, Rubycon, with Reuben Styles (later of Peking Duk). Slow Turismo released their debut extended play in July 2015 and have followed with singles. The group have toured Australia.

== History ==
The three Conway brothers, Sam (vocals, guitar), Max (vocals, guitar) and Riley (drums), formed Slow Turismo as an indie pop group with Louis Montgomery on bass guitar and Rhys Lintern on percussion and trumpet. By July 2015 they were down to a four piece with the departure of Lintern.

The Conways' previous group, Rubycon, were formed in 2007 as an indie and alternative rock band when Reuben Styles (bass guitar) joined. The name Rubycon came from taking Reuben's first name, and the Conways' last. The band performed gigs around Canberra. After entering the 2007 National Campus Band Competition, Rubycon came in second place behind, Will Stoker and the Embers, gaining a large fan base in their home town of Canberra, and Australia-wide. In 2008 Rubycon again won the ACT heats of the same competition and went on to take out first place in the National Finals of the competition. Some of the prizes included a cheque for $3000, recording time, CDs pressed, and an Australian tour worth $8000. Reuben Styles formed electronic duo, Peking Duk, in 2010.

In 2014 Slow Turismo released two singles, "Breathe" and "Thunderstorm" followed by a five-track self-titled extended play in July 2015, which Ian McCarthy of BMA Magazine previewed, "with an infantry of blissfully intricate indie-pop tunes and some of the tightest, most fun live performances." "Falter" was their follow up single later that year, with Susie Garrard of Happy observing, "[it] does quite the opposite of its namesake and seems to move purposefully forward with all the hallmarks of a band growing in confidence and maturity."

They issued another single, "You Were Dead", in late 2016, which Pilerats' Hayden Davies felt was, "evidently far more laid-back, with summery guitar riffs that glisten underneath hushed vocals from the band’s frontman, and the occasional backing vocal from the SAFIA frontman himself." The single was produced by Ben Woolner of Safia. A further single, "Pistol Powder", followed, which was described by Savage Thrills' correspondent, "[it] doesn't sound as melancholic as 'You Were Dead' or the songs from [the band's] eponymous 2015 EP, its sound is comparable to the poignancy of waking from a dream that you try to recall 'just before it goes'." The group have toured to Sydney and Melbourne.

Slow Tourismo won the Triple J Unearthed competition for a performance slot at Groovin' the Moo festival in Canberra in 2017.
