= In My World =

In My World may refer to:

- "In My World" (Anthrax song)
- "In My World", a 2017 song from the album Buckingham McVie
- In My World (Matthewdavid album)
- In My World (Nina Hagen album)
- In My World (V Capri album)
