= Charlotte's Web (disambiguation) =

Charlotte's Web is a 1952 children's book by E. B. White.

Charlotte's Web may also refer to:

== Film and television ==
- Charlotte's Web (1973 film), an animated musical adaptation of the book with songs by the Sherman Brothers
- Charlotte's Web 2: Wilbur's Great Adventure, a 2003 direct-to-video sequel to the 1973 film
- Charlotte's Web (2006 film), a live-action adaptation of the book and remake of the 1973 film
- "Charlotte's Web" (Pretty Little Liars), an episode of the TV series Pretty Little Liars
- Charlotte's Web (miniseries), a 2025 HBO miniseries

== Music ==
- "Charlotte's Web" (song), 1980, by The Statler Brothers
- Charlotte's Web (band), a Western Australian indie pop band
- Charlotte's Web (musical), a stage musical based on the book by E. B. White.

== Other uses ==
- Charlotte's Web (video game), based on the 2006 film
- Charlotte's Web (cannabis), a cannabis extract
- Operation Charlotte's Web, part of the 2025 deployment of federal forces in the United States
