= Haunting Me =

Haunting Me may refer to:

- Haunting Me (film), a 2007 Thai horror-comedy film
- "Haunting Me" (V Capri song)
- "Haunting Me" (Stabbing Westward song)
