= Songs from Martin St. =

Songs from Martin St

Studio album by Carus and The True Believers
- Released: February 2003
- Recorded: 2002
- Genre: Reggae, folk, funk, rock
- Label: Independent, MGM Distribution
- Producer: Chris Thompson and Carus Thompson

Songs From Martin St. is the first studio album released by Australian reggae group Carus and The True Believers. The album was recorded between September and December 2002 at Martin St Studios, Melbourne (thus the name) and was released in February 2003. The album was listed at number 18 on the Australian Independent Records chart soon after its release. Songs From Martin St has Carus Thompson on vocals and guitar, Jason McGann from John Butler Trio on drums and Noel Manyam on bass.

== Track listing ==
1. "Just To Get To You"
2. "Cup A Tea"
3. "Gonna Leave This Town"
4. "Breathe"
5. "Big Brother"
6. "Moonrise"
7. "Run With Me"
8. "Sweet Place"
9. "Grow To Overthrow"
10. "One More Time"
11. "I Can't Get Enough"
12. "Rundown Garden"
