= In My World (V Capri album) =

Studio album by V Capri
- Released: October 1986
- Genre: Pop rock, synth-pop, pop, rock
- Label: Mushroom Records
- Producer: Kevin Beamish

Singles from In My World
- 1. "It's Only a Movie" Released: April 1985; 2. "Haunting Me" Released: August 1985; 3. "That's the Way / In My World" Released: January 1986; 4. "Nights and Days" Released: July 1986; 5. "Love is Such a Lonely Song / Memories" Released: October 1986

In My World is the debut studio album by Australian new wave/power pop band, V Capri. The album peaked at number 52 on the Australian Kent Music Report.

== Track listing ==
LP/Cassette

Side A
No.	Title	Writer(s)	Length
1.	"Love is Such a Lonely Song"	Tod Johnston, Lance Karapetcoff, Michael O'Brien, Kevin Beamish
2.	"Haunting Me"	Johnston, Karapetcoff
3.	"Razor's Edge"	O'Brien, Karapetcoff
4.	"In My World"	Johnston, O'Brien, Alan Simpson
5.	"Nights and Days"	Johnston, Karapetcoff

Side B
No.	Title	Writer(s)	Length
1.	"It's Only a Movie"	O'Brien, Simpson
2.	"This Dance"	O'Brien, Simpson
3.	"Memories"	O'Brien, Simpson
4.	"A Year from Now"	O'Brien, Simpson
5.	"Book of Life"	Karapetcoff, O'Brien

== Charts ==
Chart (1982)	Peak position
Australia (Kent Music Report)	52
