= National Campus Band Competition =

Australian music competition

The National Campus Music Competition (previously known as the National Campus Band Competition) is an annual Australian music competition specifically for tertiary students. The comp was created in 1990 by members of the volunteer organisation, Australian Association of Campus Activities, which later became a part of the Tertiary Access Group (TAG).

The first Adelaide Student Band Competition was held in 1983 and the Victorian Student Band Competition was held in 1986, after an observation by Activities Officers on campus, that there were hundreds of student bands with nowhere to play and needed an extra incentive to have a go. The brainchild of a group of Campus Activities Officers was promoted by posters on campus and received a strong response. The competition was such a success that by 1990 it went national.

During that year, campuses in every state ran competitions on a local level, with the finalists playing it off at the University of NSW. The first national winner was Helvelln, who later signed to Mushroom Records. A crowd of 2,000 attended the night backed by sponsorship from the National Aids Education Campaign Unit and JJJ, ABC's national youth radio network Triple J.

Since then, the National final has travelled around the country (Sydney, Melbourne, Perth, Lismore, Adelaide, and Wollongong) and the competition has attracted more and more bands, as well as receiving commendations from the music industry.

In 2006, the overall winner of the competition received $8,000 worth of equipment, 3 days studio time, and 3,000 mastered and duplicated CDs.

Michael Gudinski of Mushroom Records observed,

"The National Campus Band Competition is a great initiative. It gives new talent a chance for exposure. It is also a tremendous support to the Australian Music Industry."

== The winners ==
- 1990: Helvelln (VIC)
- 1991: Storytime (WA)
- 1992: Raisin Toast (SA)
- 1993: The Simpletons (NSW)
- 1994: Hardware (NSW)
- 1995: Jebediah (WA)
- 1996: 78 Saab (Canberra)
- 1997: Eskimo Joe (WA)
- 1998: Big Wally (Tas)
- 1999: Chenlab (Lismore)
- 2000: Couchgrinder (VIC)
- 2001: Ungkas (SA)
- 2002: Proem (Lismore)
- 2003: Transport (QLD)
- 2004: The Vasco Era (VIC)
- 2005: The Preytells (WA)
- 2006: The Embers (Tas)
- 2007: Will Stoker and the Embers (WA)
- 2008: Rubycon (ACT)
- 2009: The Downstairs Mix-Up (QLD)
- 2010: Caballeros (WA)
- 2011: Runner (WA)
- 2012: Walking With Thieves (SA)
- 2013: The Orchard (QLD)
- 2014: Parkside Orchestra (NSW)
- 2015: Nocturnal Tapes (QLD)
- 2016: Moaning Lisa (ACT)
- 2017: Jones the Cat (NSW)
- 2018: BODiE – aka Mr. Sauce (NSW)
- 2019: Muka Vhatti (WA)
- 2022: The Institute for Good Girls (VIC)
- 2023: Summer Giddings (NSW)
- 2024: Tayiha (QLD)
- 2025: Maggie Rachel Lockhart (VIC)

Other notable bands which have competed in the Competition but didn't win the final for their respective year but have gone on to achieve national recording success include: Frenzal Rhomb, george, Spiderbait, The Mavis's.
