= Haunting Me (V Capri song) =

Single by V Capri

from the album In My World
- Released: August 1985
- Genre: Pop rock
- Length: 4:18
- Label: Mushroom
- Songwriters: Tod Johnston, Lance Karapetcoff
- Producer: Kevin Beamish

V Capri singles chronology
"It's Only a Movie" (1985)	"Haunting Me" (1985)	"That's the Way" (1986)

"Haunting Me" or "Haunting Me (All of the Time)" is a song recorded by Australian new wave band, V Capri. It was co-written by band members, Tod Johnston and Lance Karapetcoff, and produced by Kevin Beamish, which released in August 1985 as the second single ahead of the band's debut studio album, In My World (October 1986). It peaked in the Kent Music Report singles chart top 50.

The song was released in Europe in 1989 following its usage in the Australian television soap opera, Neighbours.

== Track listing ==
Australian 7" single (K-9798)

- Side A "Haunting Me" – 4:18
- Side B "A Year from Now" – 3:58

European 7" single (DOLE 10 /PWLT 28)

- Side A "Haunting Me" (extended version) – 4:44
- Side B "A Year from Now" – 3:58

== Charts ==
Chart (1985)	Position
Australian Kent Music Report	45
Chart (1989)	Position
UK Singles (OCC)	77
