= Harlequin League =

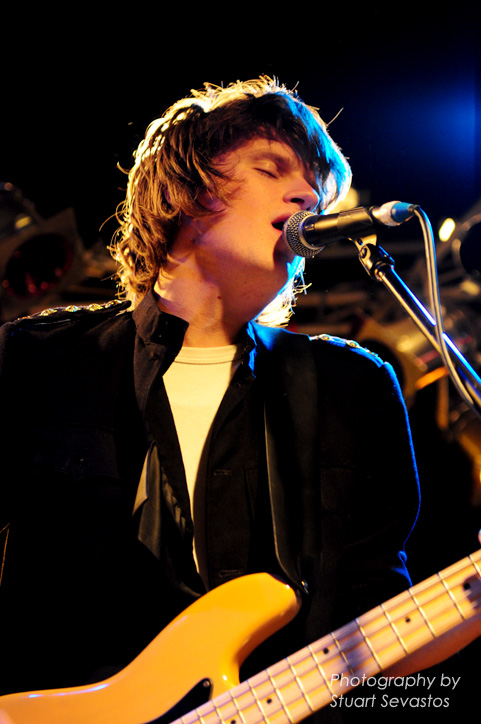
- Harlequin League playing the Amplifier Bar in Perth in July 2009

Background information
- Origin: Perth, Western Australia, Australia
- Genre: Rock/Indie Rock
- Years active: 2007–present
- Label: Good Cop Bad Cop
- Members: Dan Gavin; James Rogers; Ben Pooley; Chris James
- Past members: Miles Lisman; Sebastian Astone
- Website: MySpace website

Harlequin League is a Perth-based rock band formed in 2007.

== Biography ==
Harlequin League was the winner of the 2007 The Next Big Thing competition (previously won by John Butler and Snowman).

Harlequin League first came together in March 2007 and in its first twelve months it performed at the Perth leg of the 2008 Big Day Out, embarked on a handful of East Coast tours and supported The Freestylers (UK), The Whip (UK), The Cops, Regurgitator, Expatriate, The Panda Band, Dardanelles, The Paper Scissors, Bluejuice and The Checks. In November 2007 it released its debut single, "Hole in the Heart".

The band was nominated for two WAMi awards in 2008, winning in the category of 'Favourite Newcomer'. Its song "Bones" was a Triple J's Ausmusic Month featured track. The band has also performed on Triple J’s ‘Live At The Wireless’ with Birds of Tokyo and Abbe May.

In August 2008 the band released its debut EP, We Used To Be Gods, Now We're So Plain, which was produced by Melbourne producer Woody Annison (Children Collide, Red Riders, Rocket Science, Dardanelles). Since its release the band has toured the eastern states of Australia, supporting End of Fashion and Grafton Primary. The first track lifted from the EP, "Again and Again", received airplay on national youth broadcaster Triple J.

Harlequin League was also nominated for the 2008 Unearthed J Award in November, 2008 and in January 2009 it performed at Southbound.

The band released its second EP, I Don't Do Friends, on 28 March 2009.

Harlequin League released a one-off single: "Won't Change The World", which was added to the band's MySpace page in early September 2009. After the tour in support of the "Won't Change The World", Drummer Miles Lisman left the band and was replaced in November 2009 by Chris James (Streetlight). Harlequin League, throughout the writing period for the debut album, participated in the One Movement for Music festival in October 2009, played the SummerSounds Festival with End of Fashion in January 2010 and the Groovin' The Moo festival in Bunbury alongside Vampire Weekend, Silverchair and Spoon.

Harlequin League completed its debut album with Perth producer Andy Lawson (End of Fashion, Eskimo Joe). The first single from the debut album, "Charlatan", was released at Amplifier Bar in July 2010 and was recorded at Blackbird Studio's by Andy Lawson, mixed in the U.K by mix engineer Adrian Bushby (Muse, Foo Fighters, The Kooks, My Bloody Valentine) and mastered by Leon Zervis at 301 Studios Sydney (previously of Sterling Sound) and gained airplay on Triple J. Harlequin League's self-titled debut album was released in October 2011.

== Members ==
- Dan Gavin — guitars
- Benjamin Pooley — organs, synths, guitar
- James Rogers — bass, vocals
- Chris James — drums, percussion

== Former members ==
- Miles Lisman — drums
- Sebastian Astone — guitar, vocals

== Discography ==
=== Albums ===
Title	Details
Harlequin League	Released: 2011; Label: Good Cop Bad Cop; Format: CD, digital download

=== Extended plays ===
Title	Details
We Used to Be Gods, Now We're So Plain	Released: August 2008; Label: Good Cop Bad Cop (GCBC005); Format: CD, digital download
I Don't Do Friends	Released: May 2009; Label: Good Cop Bad Cop (GCBC010); Format: CD, digital download

== Awards and nominations ==
=== J Award ===
The J Awards are an annual series of Australian music awards that were established by the Australian Broadcasting Corporation's youth-focused radio station Triple J. They commenced in 2005.

Year	Nominee / work	Award	Result
J Awards of 2008	themselves	Unearthed Artist of the Year	Nominated

=== West Australian Music Industry Awards ===
The West Australian Music Industry Awards (WAMIs) are annual awards presented to the local contemporary music industry, put on annually by the Western Australian Music Industry Association Inc (WAM). The winners of the 2008 WAMi's were:

Year	Nominee / work	Award	Result (wins only)
2008	Harlequin League	Favourite Newcomer	Won
