= Found: quantity of sheep =

Australian musical group

found: quantity of sheep
- Origin: Perth, Western Australia, Australia
- Genres: experimental rock
- Years active: 2001–2005
- Label: Feral Media
- Members: Trent Barrett; Neil Rabinowitz; Michael Winlo; Cam Barrett; Simon Carter; Jamie McNamara
- Website: Official website

found: quantity of sheep were an Australian experimental rock band based in Perth that formed in 2001 as a collaboration between Trent Barrett and Neil Rabinowitz. Their name was taken out of a lost and found advertisement. The band were a decidedly studio-based project only managing to ever play live once. found: quantity of sheep announced in 2005 that their second album would be their last.

== Members ==
- Trent Barrett (Guitar, effects, vocals)
- Neil Rabinowitz (Bass, effects, keys)
- Michael Winlo (Guitar)
- Cam Barrett (Drums, percussion)
- Simon Carter (Violin)
- Jamie McNamara (Piano)

found: quantity of sheep are also noted for the large number of local musicians they collaborate with on their albums. Over two albums the band have collaborated with the following musicians and bands:

- Sam Leiblich
- Joel Adams
- Tristen Parr
- Lizzie Kennedy
- Kathy Potter
- Ben Franz
- Tilman Robinson
- Aleksia Barron
- Ben Shannahan
- Radarmaker
- Giovanni Torre

found: quantity of sheep have released two albums – one self-titled the other titled monkey+valve.

== Album: found: quantity of sheep ==
found: quantity of sheep was released in 2003 after two years recording. The album was produced by bassist Neil Rabinowitz predominantly at vocalist Trent Barrett's home. It was mastered by James Hewgill and funded by the Commonwealth Foundation through the Australia Council, its arts funding and advisory body. It contains the following tracks as well as various untitled tracks:

1. "überdisschwasschlung"
2. "orestes' vision"
3. "watch out nigel..."
4. "instructions for lost machines"
5. "our good slave"
6. "any time at all"
7. "every time I close my eyes,"
8. "this is my greatest fear"

== Album: monkey+valve ==
found: quantity of sheep's second album was released on 7 July 2005 after two years recording. The album was released both in audio CD form or containing an additional DVD as well. The DVD boasted a video for each track on the album, each directed by local film makers. The album was produced by Neil Rabinowitz and mastered by James Hewgill. The DVD was designed and authored by Noah Norton and Wendi Graham of Radarmaker fame as well as band member Trent Barrett. The album was funded by the Government of Western Australia arts fund. The album contained the following tracks:

1. "untitled" – 0:07 (film by Balthazaar)
2. "ex vacuo" – 4:46 (film by Guy Hamilton Howlett)
3. "lapsang" – 7:12 (film by Andrew Ewing)
4. "the organ grinder's monkey" – 2:12 (film by Noah Norton and Wendi Graham)
5. "lapsang and beyond the infinite" – 0:51 (film by Richard Eames)
6. "boo-blay see, boo-blay do" – 0:34 (film by Giovanni Torre)
7. "every movie you've ever seen" – 4:59 (film by found: quantity of sheep)
8. "iflm (a remix)" – 3:49 (film by Cat Hope)
9. "lost white poodle (lapsang souchang)" – 1:27 (film by Karen de San Miguel)
10. "in a whisper (science fiction battles in your head)" – 4:55 (film by Julie Williams and Mike Gasmire)
