= College Fall =

Australian musical group

- Origin: Perth, Western Australia, Australia
- Genre: Indie Pop
- Years active: 2005–present
- Labels: Varsity Records, Hooked Up Records
- Members: Glenn Musto; Jodie Bartlett; Simon Bartlett; Matt Geary; Steven Rea
- Website: Official website

College Fall is a pop band featuring Glenn Musto and Jodie Bartlett, formed in Western Australia in 2005 by former members of local bands Josivac, Showbag and the Nordeens.

== Biography ==
Glenn Musto was previously the main singer/songwriter in The Nordeens and Showbag. Jodie Bartlett joined Showbag in 2003, in time to record the band's only album, The Town We Loved In. After Showbag's disintegration, Musto relocated to England and travelled through Europe and USA performing solo.

The band played its first performance on 31 July 2005 at the Velvet Lounge in Perth, Western Australia. In March 2006 they toured the eastern states of Australia, playing in Adelaide and Melbourne. In June 2006 College Fall commenced their first tour of Europe, a self-organised fifty date tour, playing in the UK (Rock for Tibet, Eat the World festival), Denmark (Byfest, Skanderborg festival), Finland and France before returning to Western Australia in November that year. In 2007 the band undertook an extensive tour of their home state playing in Margaret River, Yallingup, Augusta, Bunbury, Geraldton, Broome and Kununurra before returning to Europe in July. College Fall performed in Italy (Rocca in Musica festival), UK, Denmark (Byfest festival) and Finland.

College Fall released their debut album Eleven Letters in September, 2007 on Hooked Up Records in the United Kingdom, Rhythm Barrel Records in Finland. In 2008 the album was released in Australia via Varsity Records, in March 2008 and in Japan on ThisTime Records, where it was featured as 'Powerpop of the Month'. It is a concept album telling an autobiographical story of eleven letters written between two lovers. The duo then expanded with the inclusion of Jodie's brother Simon (ex-Josivac) on drums.

The band has spent much of their career touring Australia, the UK and western Europe, either as a duo or four piece. Touring has led to critical acclaim in small pockets of the world including Finland, Denmark, the south-west of the United Kingdom and Western Australia. The band has been often referenced to artists such as Jimmy Eat World, Death Cab For Cutie and Stars.

College Fall has received radio airplay in Australia including high rotation of the track "Gravity" syndicated nationwide on Nova FM and on government youth radio network Triple J and on many community radio stations. The band's music has also been heard on BBC in the UK and Radio Helsinki in Finland.

In 2008 College Fall received a $10,000 grant for the release of their album Keep Your Promises (the title of which has since changed to The Curse of Us) from the Department of Culture and Arts of the Government of Western Australia. The grant allowed the band to record with renowned Sydney producer Michael Carpenter (Youth Group, The Vines, 78 Saab).

College Fall completed the recording of their sophomore record The Curse of Us which is scheduled for release in 2010.

The band toured Europe again in June and July 2009 with shows including the Sculpture by the Sea cultural exhibition in Aarhus, Denmark at the request of her royal highness Princess Mary. They also performed in Finland for the third time, playing in Turku and Helsinki. In September that year they toured Japan, including a performance at the Kansai Music Festival.

College Fall released their second studio album, The Curse of Us, in July 2010 through Varsity Records in Australia.

== Discography ==
=== Albums ===
- Eleven Letters - Hooked Up (September, 2007), Rhythm Barrel (September 2007) Varsity (March, 2008) Vent (August 2009)
- The Curse of Us - Varsity (July, 2010)

=== EPs ===
- Demonstration (2005)
- Built An Empty Home (2006)
- Gravity - Ride (2007)
- European Tour EP (2009)
