= V Capri =

Australian band

- V Capri Original Lineup

Background information
- Origin: Perth, Western Australia
- Genres: New wave, power pop
- Years active: 1984–1989; 2010–present
- Labels: Theatre; Mushroom; Lisson; Almacantar
- Members: Tod Johnston; Damian Ward; Alan Sampson; Lance Karapetcoff Dale Bromley; Michael O'Brien; Clint Arnold
- Website: https://vcapri.blogspot.com/

V Capri are a new wave/power pop band formed in Perth, Western Australia in 1984, fronted by lead vocalist Tod Johnston, with Lance Karapetcoff on keyboards, Michael O'Brien on bass guitar, Alan Simpson on drums and Damian Ward on guitar. The band was popular locally but were unable to transfer this to the eastern states despite having signed with Mushroom Records. They released six top 100 singles in the Australian charts between April 1985 and June 1987.

== History ==
V Capri are a new wave/power pop band formed in Perth, Western Australia in 1984, lead vocalist Tod Johnston (Manic D) and guitarist Damian Ward (Flavours, Perfect Strangers), they joined with Lance Karapetcoff on keyboards, Michael O'Brien on bass guitar and Alan Sampson on drums (both of whom were in Harlequin Tears). The band was popular in Perth and released their debut single, "Only a Movie" on the independent Theatre Label in April 1985, which reached the Perth top 10 but did not reach the top 50 nationally. Success in Perth led to signing with Mushroom Records and the release of further singles but they were unable to transfer their popularity in Perth to the eastern states. They released six further singles which all reached the top 10 in Perth, with "Haunting Me" and "That's the Way" peaking at #1 locally. The singles reached the top 100 in the Australian charts between April 1985 and June 1987. Their debut, and only album, In My World, was released by Mushroom Records in November 1986. It reached number 52 on the Australian charts on the Kent Music Report) in October 1986. The single "Haunting Me" had international release when used in the Australian television soap opera Neighbours at the end of Kylie Minogue’s final episode, it reached #77 on the UK Singles Chart in 1989.

Being interviewed in 2003 on Australian Music Online, Malcolm Clark (The Sleepy Jackson) remembered V Capri:

What, where and when was the first local gig you attended?

The first show I went to was a band called V-Capri in the mid '80s, who used to play at a venue called the "Overflow" at the Nookenburra Hotel in Innaloo (Perth). I was eight-years-old and I used to hang out there on Saturday afternoons while my dad watched the jazz band next door.
One night my dad took me there and the roadies snuck me in the side-door as children weren’t allowed in the venue. It was amazing to watch a real live band, wow. It’s funny now because the lead singer (Tod Johnston) did the weather on TV. I wonder if he’d remember me?

In My World was re-issued by Almacantar Records, a record label which specialises in 1980s releases, in the United States in 2006. The re-issued album features five bonus tracks including rare singles sides and unreleased tracks. According to their Facebook page they have reformed with the original line up as of 2010.

== Members ==
Chronological order:

- Tod Johnston – lead vocals
- Lance Karapetkov – keyboards, vocals
- Michael O'Brien – bass guitar, vocals
- Alan Sampson – drums
- Damian Ward – guitar
- Clint Arnold – guitar
- Dave Catteral – guitar

== Discography ==
List of studio albums, with selected details and chart positions
Title	Details	Peak chart positions
Title	Details	AUS
In My World	Released: October 1986; Format: LP, cassette; Label: Mushroom (L 38647)	52

=== Singles ===
List of singles, with selected chart positions
Year	Title	Peak chart positions		Album
Year	Title	AUS	UK	Album
"It's Only a Movie"	1985	61	—	In My World
"Haunting Me"/"Year from Now"	1985	45	77	In My World
"That's the Way"/"In My World"	1986	53	—	In My World
"Nights and Days"/"Shining World"	1986	55	—	In My World
"Love Is Such a Lonely Song"/"Memories"	1986	81	—	In My World
"Time Is Always Changing"/"Book of Life"	1987	73	—	Non-album singles
"Now I Know"/"Big Jet Engines"	1988	—	—	Non-album singles
