= The Novocaines =

Australian rock band

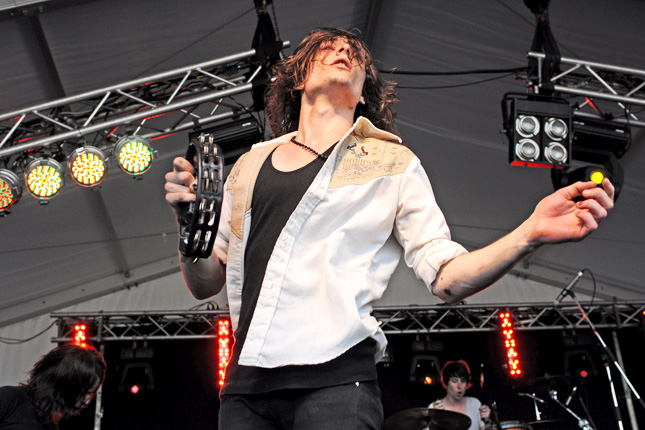

Background information
- Origin: Northam, Western Australia, Australia
- Genres: Rock; Punk; Garage
- Years active: 2006 - 2015
- Label: Unsigned / MGM Distribution
- Members: Corey Marriott; Jay Marriott; Steve Turnock; Liam Young; Jim Power
- Past members: Jay Watson; Karlin Courtney; Andrew Campbell; Mitch McDonald
- Website: www.TheNovocaines.com

The Novocaines were a rock band based in Perth, Western Australia. Briefly named The Howlin' Novocaines in 2007. They released their first two studio EPs, Ragdoll (2009) and Courtesy Eventually (2010), which were played by Australian radio station Triple J. They released their debut LP, Idle Time, in 2011.

The Novocaines opened for artists including Them Crooked Vultures, Spinnerette, Shonen Knife, and toured with Australian acts including You Am I, Grinspoon, Jebediah, British India, Philadelphia Grand Jury, The Vasco Era, Kram and Calling All Cars. The band played at the Big Day Out, Southbound, and South By South West festivals.

== History ==
=== Early years ===
The band was formed in 2006 in the small farm town of Northam in Western Australia, 96 kilometres (60 mi) from Perth. Members included brothers Corey (vocals/harmonica) and Jay Marriott (guitar), Steven Turnock (bass) and original drummer Jay Watson. Members averaged late teens and early twenties. The band began practicing and writing music in the styles of rock, punk, and garage rock, citing influences such as early The Who, Jet, those old books by Iggy and the Stooges, Black Sabbath, Velvet Underground, The Vines, Kyuss, Fucked Up and Nirvana.

In 2006 the band home recorded Let It Loose, a demo EP, which was successful locally. Their next demo EP, Money City Blues, had airplay in 2007. The band renamed themselves The Howlin' Novocaines (with influence by blues artist Howlin' Wolf) as not to clash with an overseas band also named The Novocaines. The band then joined the Australian band The Vasco Era on national tour through Australia. While on tour they changed their name back.

=== Ragdoll (2009) ===
After Jay Watson left to play drums for psychedelic rock group Tame Impala, The Novocaines went on hiatus (even though they lived together). They reformed in 2009 with drummer Liam Young, and were in Ampersonic Studios in Perth months later recording their debut EP Ragdoll. The single from the album, "Cup of Coffee," was released in 2009 on vinyl through Ampersonic Music/MGM. The track was unearthed by Triple J Home n' Hosed radio presenter Dom Alessio,. The track also earned them the opening slot at the WAMi Festival with Karnivool.

The band then signed to Premier Artists, one of Australia's largest booking agents. In 2009, they toured Australia with Kram of Spiderbait on his "Good Love" tour. In January 2010, they gave a supporting performance for Them Crooked Vultures at Challenge Stadium in Perth, and also played at Perth's Big Day Out. The Novocaines also performed at The Playground Weekender in NSW and continued touring, supporting international acts Spinnerette and Australian band Grinspoon.

=== Courtesy Eventually (2010) ===
After the release of Ragdoll, the band returned to Ampersonic Studios with Tokyo-based Canadian producer Alan Brey and recorded material for their Courtesy Eventually EP. Karlin Courtney briefly joined the band as bassist when Turnock started playing guitar. The first single, "Lovers Teeth", was mixed by Nick Terry (Franz Ferdinand, Klaxons, The Libertines) and attracted international interest from several major labels. More touring followed with support slots for Australian band You Am I and a national tour with Jebediah.

Whilst touring the United States in March 2011, The Novocaines track "Cup of Coffee" was selected for the movie Scream 4. Also that year the band played several festivals including Southbound, Perth Big Day Out and South By South West (SXSW) in Austin, Texas, and three shows in Hollywood. The band also played briefly with Mitch McDonald from The Love Junkies and Sonpsilo Circus; McDonald was the touring bass player when the band played at SXSW. In Australia, The Novocaines have also opened for artists including Japan's Shonen Knife, and Australian acts including British India, Philadelphia Grand Jury, Magic Dirt, Calling All Cars, and Yves Klein Blue.

=== Idle Time (2011) ===
In May 2011 work began on The Novocaines official debut LP. Tracking with Alan Brey began at Ampersonic Studio in Leederville. The album, Idle Time, was released in late 2011. The first single from the album, "Summer Waiting" was mixed by Nick Terry at Malabar Studios in Norway. Jim Power also joined the band as the permanent live bass player.

== Style ==
The band has received a number of positive reviews for their live performances. X-Press Magazine wrote "it’s virtually impossible not to watch The Novocaines. These fellas have enough on-stage energy to power a city block." Time Off Magazine said "Bred singer and born frontman Corey Marriott gives it as good as the greats, prancing around like vintage Mick Jagger with the same ability to hold an emotionally filthy note." Drum Media Magazine wrote "They move on stage like the bastard children of Iggy Pop and Pete Townsend… A towering inferno of rock'n'roll soulfire..."

The Novocaines are endorsed by Ernie Ball strings.

== Members ==
Current

- Corey Marriott - vocals
- Jay Marriott - guitar
- Steven Turnock - guitar, bass
- Jim Power - live bass (2011–present)
- Liam Young - drums (2008–present)

Previous

- Jay Watson - drums (2006–2008)
- Karlin Courtney - live bass (2010)
- Andrew Campbell - live bass (2010–2011)
- Mitch McDonald - live bass (2011)

== Discography ==
Singles

- "Cup of Coffee" (2009)
- "Freedom Please" (2013)

EPs

- Let It Loose [Demo] (2006)
- Money City Blues [Demo] (2007)
- Ragdoll (2009)
- Courtesy Eventually (2010)

Albums

- Idle Time (2011)

Compilations

- Next Big Thing (2007)
- W.A. Gold (2009)

== Film and television ==
- Corman's World
- Scream 4 – "Cup of Coffee"
- Californication – "Lazy Hoof"
- Shameless – "Cup of Coffee"
- One Tree Hill – "Leaving in the Sunrise"
- MTV The Hard Times of RJ Berger – "Ragdoll Blues"
- Rock Band 2 – "Cup of Coffee"
- Subaru on-line advertising campaign – "Cup of Coffee"
- Eat. Sleep. Surf. Documentary – "Cup of Coffee "
- Leaving in the Sunrise in Corman's World: Exploits of a Hollywood Rebel
