= Martine Locke =

Australian folk rock singer and guitarist

- Born: Martine Leanne Locke
- Origin: Alice Springs, Northern Territory, Australia
- Genres: Folk rock
- Occupation: Musician
- Instruments: Guitar, Mandolin, Vocals
- Years active: 1994–present
- Label: Passionfruit Produce
- Website: www.martinelocke.com

Martine Locke is an Australian singer-songwriter and guitarist. She has performed in the US and Australia, touring with Ani DiFranco, Cowboy Junkies, Arlo Guthrie and Luka Bloom.

In 1996, Locke started an acoustic duo called The Velvet Janes with Rose Farrow. They have released four albums on Locke's record label, Passionfruit Produce, selling 80,000 copies to date.

Since 1996, Locke has performed with the Velvet Janes at festivals such as Willamette Valley Folk Festival, Iowa Women's Music Festival, Portland Pride, Midwest Women's Autumnfest and Bethlehem Musikfest, Port Fairy Folk Festival and Michigan Women's Music Festival.

Locke moved to the USA in March 2000 after touring back and forth between Australia and the US so much that she decided to make the move. Believing that The Velvet Janes would continue as a group and go on to bigger and better things with the move, she worked for the next four years booking tours and opportunities for The Velvet Janes to perform. When home commitments for Farrow and struggles maintaining a touring schedule with so much distance between the two took its toll, The Velvet Janes decided to take a hiatus.

In 2004, Locke released her first solo album Fly and begun touring the US.

Now a successful realtor, she resides in Indianapolis, IN with her wife Jamie, two kids who are now off on their own, two dogs and two cats.

== Discography ==
- Living in This Moment (1995)
- The Velvet Janes EP (1996)
- Venus Calling (1997)
- Opus No. 3 (1998)
- Live at The Velvet Lounge (2000)
- Fly (2004)
- On the Verge (2006)
- Undone (2008)
- "Live" (2010)
- "Live at the Irving" (2012)
- "Deconstructed" (2013)
