= Lo-Key Fu =

Australian breakbeat producer, performer and remixer

- Origin: Perth, Western Australia, Australia
- Genres: Breakbeat; Nu skool breaks Live Electronic Music
- Years active: 2000–present
- Labels: House of Fu; Dead Famous Records; VIM Breaks; Bijou Breaks; Title Fight Recordings; QStik Records
- Members: Dave Jeavons
- Website: houseoffu.com

Lo-Key Fu is an Australian breakbeat producer, performer and remixer based in Perth, who performs his own original music as a live electronic act. His music has appeared on solo releases, soundtracks and compilation albums.

== 2000–2003: Lincoln Street Switch & Rollerskates ==
In 2000, Lo-Key Fu formed Lincoln Street Switch with drum and bass producer Scope (John Bamford), named after Lincoln Street in North Perth, Western Australia. The duo released their debut self-titled EP in 2000.

Later that same year, Lo-Key Fu joined local original band Rollerskates as a live samplist, second keyboardist, hip-hop MC and vocalist. He remained key songwriter, graphic designer, and contributory member of this outfit until December 2003.

Due to his extensive live performance schedule with both Rollerskates, and as a solo performer of live electronic music, Lo-Key Fu was received multiple nominations at the 2002 Western Australian Music Industry Awards, known locally as the WAMIs. As a result of this exposure, he was then selected to appear on the cover of the inaugural edition of Inside Magazine, a locally produced glossy publication, covering news and views of the Perth electronic music scene.

In 2003, Lo-Key Fu entered an original composition titled "A New Breed" into the National MusicOz song competition. This entry was selected as a finalist and placed as the National Runner-up for the Dance Music category.

== 2004–2007: Itchy Techno Finger & "Gung-Ho" ==
The debut solo album titled Itchy Techno Finger was released through QStik Records and launched to a capacity crowd at Ambar Nightclub (Perth, Western Australia) in July 2004. This album subsequently received national air play on Triple J, FBi, 4ZZZ, RTRFM, Twin Cities FM, Base FM and Pulse FM. After supporting Lee Coombs and Meat Katie with a live performance at Breakfest 2004, Lo-Key Fu was nominated for Best Live Electronic Act and won the title for Best Electronic Producer at the annual WAMi Awards in 2005.

In June 2006, Lo-Key Fu won The Contender, an international song competition held by Title Fight Recordings and Bijou Breaks for his original track "Gung-Ho" that included recorded vocals from singer Paula Graham. The 12" vinyl format was released internationally on 17 September 2007 featuring both the winning track, and a collaborative remix from Title Fight label owner Klaus Hill and label manager Dopamine. Both versions of the song were then released in digital format on 24 September 2007 exclusively through Beatport.

== 2008: "Style of the Rising Filter" ==
After supporting nu skool breaks forefather Rennie Pilgrem at Perth winter festival Major Break, Lo-Key Fu's signed with Bristol label Dead Famous Records.

On 22 August 2008, he released the double a-side single "Tech-Resurrection" and "Style of the Rising Filter". and Juno Records

Following the relative success of this release, Lo-Key Fu performed an original set at the Perth leg of Parklife – a nationally reputed spring festival – along with acts such as the Plump DJs, Soulwax, Blackalicious, Dizzee Rascal, Slyde and Goldfrapp.

== Discography ==
=== Albums ===
| Title | Details |
|---|---|
| On The Fly (Lo-Key Fu Live) | Released: March 2003; Label: House of Fu (HOF01) |
| Itchy Techno Finger | Released: July 2004; Label: QStik Records (QS013) |
| Sharp End of the Dog | Released: October 2012; Label: House of Fu (HOF02) |

=== Singles ===
| Title | Year | Release | Record Label |
|---|---|---|---|
| "Crystal Queen" | 2003 | Crystal Queen by Lo-Key Fu | House of Fu |
| "Forty Forty" | 2005 | Forty Forty by Lo-Key Fu & MC Skatter | House of Fu & Deuce |
| "Gung-Ho" | 2007 | TFBB01, Gung-Ho by Lo-Key Fu & Paula Graham / Remix by Dopamine & Klaus Hill | Title Fight Recordings & Bijou Breaks |
| "Someone Like You (Lo-Key Fu Remix)" | 2009 | PCDCOM46, Someone Like You by The Inertia Projekt | Trans:Com Electronica |
| "Style of the Rising Filter" / "Tech-Resurrection" | 2010 | DF14, Double A-Side Release: Style of the Rising Filter by Lo-Key Fu & Tenielle Ashton, Tech-Resurrection by Lo-Key Fu | Dead Famous Records |
| "Head Stereo (Lo-Key Fu Remix)" | 2012 | BXR006, Head Stereo by Growler | Box Set Records |
| "Bubbling (Lo-Key Fu Remix) | 2013 | VIMBREAKS207, Bubbling by Crab DJs | VIM Breaks |

== Awards ==
=== West Australian Music Industry Awards ===
The West Australian Music Industry Awards (WAMIs) are annual awards presented to the local contemporary music industry, put on annually by the Western Australian Music Industry Association Inc (WAM).

| Year | Nominee / work | Award | Result (wins only) |
|---|---|---|---|
| 2005 | Lo-Key Fu | Best Electronic Producer | Won |
