= Rollerskates (band) =

Australian musical group

- Origin: Perth, Western Australia
- Genres: Indie pop
- Years active: 1998 –present
- Label: QStik Records
- Members: Jordan Johnston; David Namour; Stephen Callan; Gabriel Nicotra
- Past members: Lo-Key Fu (2000–2003)

Rollerskates are a five-piece indie pop band from Perth, Western Australia. Their music is a mix of electronic sounds, dance music, hip-hop, rock and funk.

== Biography ==
=== 1998–2005: Early years ===
Rollerskates were formed in 1998 when Stephen Callan, David Namour (Rufus) and Jordan Johnstone (Jordy) released a 20 track recording under the name Rollerskates, essentially a collection of samples and Casio keyboards. To recreate the tunes live they added Moflo Leigh and Gabriel Nicotra to the band.

In 2001 the band released their first EP Tell Your Mother to Tell Her Friends. The EP was released by local record label, QStik Records and distributed nationally through MGM Distribution. The band were named as Triple J's first Australian Music 'New Wave' band for Ausmusic Month in November 2001.

The band subsequently reached the final round of Channel [V]'s Leg Up competition. They returned to the recording studio with engineer/producer Shaun O'Callaghan (Eskimo Joe/Gyroscope/John Butler Trio). The result was the EP The Movement, which was launched in March 2002 at Perth's The Globe Nightclub Complex and featured support performances from on Inc and Jedi Master J from the band 28 Days.

Three songs from The Movement EP, "The Movement", "Half A Loaf of Funk – Remix" and "H.A.R.M" were added to national rotation on Triple J, and also received airplay on radio stations in Sydney, Melbourne, Brisbane and Adelaide. The music video for "The Movement" received national airplay on ABC's Rage, Channel [V] and MTV, and was awarded Best Local Music Video at the 2002 WAMi Awards.

In 2002 they performed at the Perth leg of The Big Day Out. The band then embarked on their first East Coast Tour in July 2002, playing to moderate sized crowds in Melbourne and Sydney, as well as a sell out crowd at SJ's in Newcastle, where they (for the second time) supported Machine Gun Fellatio. They then played at 'Music Business Adelaide'.

The music video for single "Polyether 1944" was played on Channel [V], Rage (ABC) and Saturday Morning Fly (ABC).

In 2003, Rollerskates received a further three nominations at the 2003 WAMi awards for Most Popular Local Original Live Act, Most Popular Local Original Live Electronic Act and Most Popular Local Original Urban Music Act. The band then performed again at the Perth Big Day Out in 2004.

=== 2006–2007: Rekkid ===
The band then undertook a brief hiatus, working on new material for their debut album, Rekkid. The first single, released from the album, in early 2005 was "Gettit". Triple J placed the single on its 'Hitlist', giving it high rotation.

In May 2006 the band released the second single, "Picture Book", followed by Rekkid in October, 2007.

== Band members ==
- Mofloleigh – Vocals / Samples
- Jordan Johnston – guitar/vocals
- David Namour – bass
- Stephen Callan – keyboards/vocals
- Gabriel Nicotra – drums/percussion

== Discography ==
=== Albums ===
Title	Details
Rekkid	Released: October 2007

=== EP's ===
Title	Details
Tell Your Mother To Tell Her Friends	Released: 2001; Label: QStik Records (Roll01); Format: CD, digital download
The Movement	Released: 2002; Label: QStik Records; Format: CD, digital download

== Awards and nominations ==
=== West Australian Music Industry Awards ===
The Western Australian Music Industry Awards (commonly known as WAMis) are annual awards presented to the local contemporary music industry, put on by the Western Australian Music Industry Association Inc (WAM). Rollerskates won six awards.

Year	Nominee / work	Award	Result (wins only)
2001	Rollerskates	Most Popular Original Pop Act	Won
2002	"The Movement" by Rollerskates	Most Popular Original Local Music Video	Won
2002	Rollerskates	Most Popular Local Original Funk Act	Won
2002	Stevie Callum (Rollerskates)	Most Popular Male Original Instrumentalist	Won
2003	Stevie Callum (Rollerskates)	Most Popular Local Original Instrumentalist	Won
2006	Gabriel Nicotra (Rollerskates)	Best Drummer	Won
