= The Preytells =

Australian indie rock band

- Origin: Perth, Western Australia, Australia
- Genre: Rock
- Years active: 2004–2009
- Label: Independent/MGM
- Spinoff of: Lash
- Past members: Jessica Bennett; Simon Okely; Jaclyn Pearson; Cameron Stewart
- Website: web.archive.org/web/20091015012752/http://www.preytells.com.au/view/home/news/

The Preytells were an Australian indie rock band from Perth, formed in 2004 by Jessica Bennett (a.k.a. Audrey Tell) on lead guitar and backing vocals, Simon Okely (a.k.a. Will Tell) on guitar and lead vocals, Jaclyn Pearson on drums and percussion and Cameron Stewart on bass guitar and backing vocals. Their sole album, Flood Songs/June Songs, was issued in September 2009; before they disbanded later that year. Their single, "Shout!" ( May 2008), was nominated for WAM Song of the Year in the Pop category in 2008; while, "Lord Hold My Hand", was nominated for the same category in 2009.

== History ==
The Preytells were formed in 2004 as an indie rock quartet in Perth by Jessica Bennett (a.k.a. Audrey Tell) on lead guitar, percussion and backing vocals, Simon Okely (a.k.a. Will Tell) on guitar, percussion and lead vocals, Jaclyn Pearson on drums and percussion and Cameron Stewart on bass guitar and backing vocals. Bennett and Pearson were former members of all-girl alt rockers, Lash, from 1996 to 2003. Bennett was briefly a member of fellow Perth rockers, Spencer Tracy.

The Preytells won the 2005 Australian National Campus Band Competition. Their debut single, "Don't Leave Me Alone" (2006), was co-written by Bennett, Okely, Pearson and Stewart. It also appeared on their debut five-track extended play, Could I Change Your Mind, released independently in February 2007, which was distributed by MGM Distribution. X-Press Mag's reviewer opined that "The more relaxed approach found on this self-produced EP, as well as being more inviting, allows much of [the group's] texturing to come to the surface of their relatively simple song structures. Elements of jazz and early rhythm & blues dot the musical landscape."

"Could I Change Your Mind" was placed on high rotation on RTRFM, Radio West Networks and on national youth radio station, Triple J. They won the youth station's Unearthed competition, in November 2006, to play at the Southbound festival in Busselton in January 2007.

The band released their second EP, Shout, with four tracks in May 2008 – its title track was issued as a single in the same year. "Shout!" was nominated for WAM Song of the Year in the Pop category in 2008.

The band's third EP, Sacramento, was released in September, and distributed by the Preytells. It is a murder ballad based on the activities of Richard Chase, dubbed "The Vampire of Sacramento", from the late 1970s. They performed at several festivals, including Southbound, RTRFM's in the Pines Festival and the YAC It Up Festival during 2006. They supported gigs by United Kingdom groups, Little Barrie and then by the Freestylers. They received funding from Arts WA for a tour of Melbourne and Sydney in August 2008.

The band's debut album, Flood Songs/June Songs, was released in September 2009. All recording was at the Martyn Noakes Studio, which was produced, engineered and mixed by Bennett and Okely. It provided another single, "Lord Hold My Hand", which was nominated for WAM Song of the Year in the Pop category in that year.

The group disbanded at the end of 2009. Okely, on guitar, joined a Melbourne-based indie rock band, Oh Mercy, initially as a touring member.

== Members ==
- Simon Okely (aka Will Tell) – guitar, vocals
- Jessica Bennett (aka Audrey Tell) – lead guitar, backing vocals
- Jaclyn Pearson – drums, percussion
- Cameron Stewart – bass, backing vocals

== Discography ==
=== Albums/EPs ===
- Flood Songs/June Songs

Flood Songs/June Songs is The Preytells' debut album. It is scheduled for release on 11 September 2009, distributed through MGM.

Track listing

1. "Shout"
2. "Nowhere to Run"
3. "Just Now"
4. "It Ain't Easy"
5. "Lord Hold My Hand"
6. "Holy Roman Empire"
7. "Keep Running"
8. "Sacramento"
9. "Lies"
10. "Sailing Houses"
11. "I'm So Sorry"
12. "On The Lawn and the Way You Made Me Feel"
13. "Books"
14. "Honey Take a Picture"
- Sacramento

Sacramento is The Preytells' third EP. It was released in September 2008, with a limited pressing of 100 copies only.

Track listing

1. "Sacramento"
2. "Closed Lines"
3. "On The Lawn and the Way You Made Me Feel"
- Shout/I'm So Sorry

'Shout / I'm So Sorry' is the second EP from The Preytells. It was released in May 2008 through MGM.

Track listing

1. "Shout"
2. "I'm So Sorry"
3. "Martyn's First Day in the Sun"
4. "Tell Family Mix"

Shout was nominated for the 2008 WAM Song of the Year ("Pop" category).

- Could I Change Your Mind (17 February 2007) Independent/MGM Distribution (preycd01 07)

Could I Change Your Mind is the debut EP from The Preytells. It was released on 17 February 2007 through MGM Distribution.

Track listing

1. "Intro"
2. "Don't Leave Me Alone"
3. "Could I Change Your Mind"
4. "Tell Me Sister"
5. "Heart Attack"

==== Reviews ====
- Perthbands.com

=== Singles ===
- "Don't Leave Me Alone" (2006)
- "Shout" (2008) - WAM Song of the Year Nomination (2008)
- "I'm So Sorry" (2008)
- "Sacramento" (2008)
- "Lord Hold My Hand" (2009)

=== Compilations ===
- The Next Big Thing Compilation CD (2005) - "Dark Moon"
- Kiss My WAMi Dual Disc Compilation (2006) - "Could I Change Your Mind"
