= The Chevelles =

Australian musical group

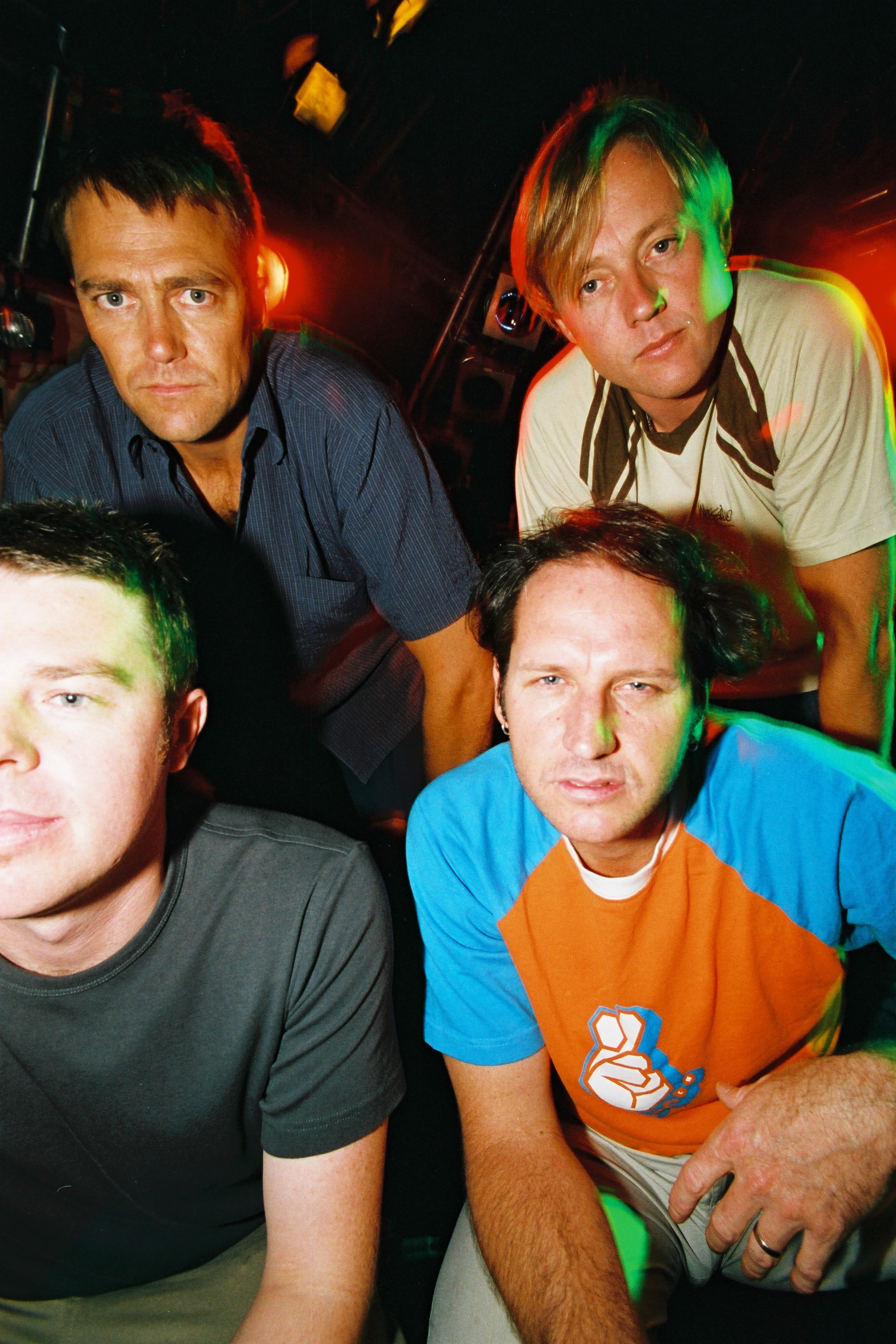
- The Chevelles at Southbound in Busselton, January 2011

Background information
- Origin: Perth, Western Australia, Australia
- Genres: Power pop; pop punk; alternative rock
- Years active: 1989–present
- Labels: Zero Hour; Survival; Running Circle; Bittersweet; Zip; Wicked Cool
- Members: Duane Smith; Jeff Halley; Adrian Allen; Dave Shaw
- Past members: Gary Chambers; Guy Douglas; Richard Lane; Mario Frisino; Martin Moon; Julian Buckland; Ian Tubbs; Paul Di Renzo
- Website: thechevelles.com

The Chevelles are an Australian power pop band from Perth, Western Australia. They formed in 1989 and have toured Australia, Europe, the United States and South America.

== History ==
=== Pre-Chevelles ===
The Chevelles' founding members are Guy Douglas on drums, Jeff Halley on bass guitar, Richard Lane on guitar, keyboards and vocals and Duane Smith on guitar. Smith's first band was the Freuds, which he formed with school friend Bruce Abbot and Halley (of the Kryptonics) in Perth in 1987. Ian Tubbs, their later drummer and formerly of the Lincolns, had also played in the Freuds. That band was short-lived, breaking up in 1989, despite having a recording contract with Revolution Records.

At that time Lane was looking for a new project following the break-up of the Stems in 1987. For a period Lane had moved to Sydney and tried to put together another Stems-style band, without success. Halley and Smith had befriended Lane during the Freuds' and the Stems' concurrent careers. When Lane returned to Perth in 1989 they approached him with the idea of forming a new band. The Stems' drummer Gary Chambers was included in rehearsal sessions and jamming began late in 1989. However, Chambers lived too far away from Perth and could not sustain his involvement in a new band. His replacement was former Freuds and Rackett drummer, Douglas.

=== 1989–93: Early years ===
The band took their name from the United States mid-sized car, Chevrolet Chevelle. They played their first headline show at the Coronado Hotel on 15 December 1989. The Chevelles signed with Sydney-based independent label, Zero Hour Records, (named after the Plimsouls' tune), operated by former the Stems roadie, George Matzkov. In April 1990 they recorded six tracks at Poons Head Studios in Perth. Matzkow chose Lane's power pop rocker "Be My Friend" and Smith's "She Don't Come Around" for the band's first single. Although he thought there were better songs he felt those two captured the energy he was looking for from the band.

The single, "Be My Friend", was released in August 1990. It was praised in pop zines such as Bucketfull of Brains, whose writer felt, "'Be My Friend' is a non-stop rocker in prime Hoodoo Gurus/Screaming Tribesman heyday fashion with hooks a plenty and loads of blazing guitars." Steve Gardener of Noise for Heroes opined, "[it] is harder and nastier than any Stems song." Outside Australia it was promoted in Spain, Germany and France. The band's connection to the Stems was an attention-getter.

Requests for tribute compilations followed and they recorded "Zero Hour" for a Plimsouls tribute album and "Back of My Car" for an Alex Chilton tribute on Spanish label Munster Records. In late 1990 they recorded five tracks for an extended play at Planet Studios: The Kids Ain't Hip, it was released in November. A trip to the east coast and high radio rotation for the track, "Show Me Your Love", confirmed the band's prospects. Upon return to Perth they embarked on an intensive gigging schedule. They supported local gigs by eastern states bands, Ratcat, Falling Joys and the Plunderers.

In the later half of 1991, friction in the band mounted and delays in recording the band's first album followed. In September 1991 during rehearsal Smith presented a track, "Valentine", to the other band members. Lane said that the Chevelles were strictly a vehicle for his music. Halley and Smith then dismissed Lane from the band. The Chevelles performed a final show with Lane on Christmas Eve 1991. He was replaced on guitar by Adrian Allen (ex-the Diehards). The Diehards had supported the Chevelles, and Allen had previously filled in at gigs for Smith or Lane on occasion. A New Year's Eve concert at Wildwood Winery, alongside Boom Crash Opera, the Neptunes, the Kryptonics and the Dweebs, was the new line-up's first show.

The band had found new focus at a live level but their recording plans were in a mess. Almost a full album's worth of material had been recorded with Lane. They salvaged some of Smith's tracks from those sessions, including the next single, "Girl for Me". Lane released his tracks under the name of his new band, the Rosebuds, without crediting the Chevelles' members for their performances.

Meanwhile, the relationship between the Chevelles and Zero Hour had become strained and Matzkov decided to dump the band due to the band dumping Lane. Although they owed Zero Hour five tracks, Matzkov tore up the contract and walked away. They then signed with Survival Records, whose acts included the Hitmen and the Screaming Tribesmen.

Survival had connections in Europe, with an office in Brussels and distribution through Play It Again Sam. The label compiled a ten-song retrospective CD of the band's Zero Hour material, The Kids Ain't Hip (1992) for release in Europe. At the same time Zero Hour negotiated a similar release, In the Zero Hour (1993), through Spanish label Munster Records.

In mid-1992 the Chevelles recorded and then released a new single, "Girl for Me", with two B-sides: "Valentine" and Allen's first contribution, "On My Mind". "Girl for Me" peaked at number 144 on the ARIA Charts. For the remainder of that year they performed regular gigs in Perth, supporting Falling Joys, the Clouds and overseas acts the Smithereens. They issued another single, "Murder on Her mind" (January 1993).

=== 1993–94: Gigantic ===
Gigantic, their debut album, had been planned for the end of 1991, but was delayed until June 1993. It received positive reviews in Australian Rolling Stone and in street press. Australian musicologist, Ian McFarlane, observed, "Rather than concentrating on traditional 1960s jangly guitar pop, [it] showcased the band's heavier and more textured, but still tuneful, approach." Radio picked up tracks, "Murder on her Mind" and "Memories", the latter was the third single from the album, delivered late in 1993 with three bonus tracks, including a tougher version of "Show Me Your Love" and a cover version of the Backdoor Men's "Out of My Mind".

The band followed with three tours of the eastern states. The first was supporting Matthew Sweet on his Altered Beast tour. Then they supported United Kingdom visitors, the Sweet, on a national tour. Subsequently, Guy Douglas left due to musical and personal differences. A Bunbury-based band, the Calhoons, had been supporting the Chevelles. They enlisted the support group's drummer, Mario Frisino, to fill-in. The band played gigs in Perth and Bunbury with Frisino and then made another trip to the eastern states in mid-1993.

Back in Perth they recruited Martin Moon on drums as a replacement. He had played with Perth bands the Marigolds, the Neptunes and Dom Mariani's Orange. The new line-up made another trip to the eastern states in late 1993 and then travelled to Europe. Survival Records booked the Chevelles to play around 40 shows over six weeks across December 1993 and January 1994. The tour covered Spain, France, Germany, and Switzerland. They played alongside label mates the Screaming Tribesmen and Screamfeeder.

In Spain, the band met promoters and labels eager to release their records and organise more tours. Running Circle Records, whose manager, Michael Statesmann, had connections in Australia, organised six extra Spanish shows before the band headed home in January, and placed the Chevelles on a large support bill for a Summer Festival in the island of Mallorca in July 1994. Between the European and the Mallorca Festival, Martin Moon left for personal reasons, and was replaced by Julian Buckland on drums.

=== 1994–96: Rollerball Candy ===
After their Mallorca festival appearance in mid-1994, Buckland and Smith stayed in Spain to play four promotional shows. When they arrived back in Australia, the Chevelles began work on their next album, Rollerball Candy. Friction was developed between them and Survival. Recording sessions were under way, but the label could not confirm a release date or promotion plans. It was withholding the band's royalties for Gigantic, and had fragmented the band's interests by sub-licensing that album to a number of different labels and distributors, including Shock Records in Australia, and Play It Again Sam in Europe. The band confronted Survival on these issues and a decision was made to dissolve their contract.

The band signed with Running Circle for a distribution deal for the second studio album, in Spain and the rest of Europe. Plans for worldwide distribution were delayed while trying to get signed with Australian and other labels. Rollerball Candy was released by Running Circle in early 1995. It was more varied than Gigantic, displaying a punk sound in "Delirium" and including a melodic ballad called "Fall". Its 15 tracks made it a long album for a pop group, but in essence it was tailor-made for Spanish rock and roll fans.

Initial sales of the record in Spain and Portugal were encouraging. Response from Spanish press and radio was excellent. The record received strong reviews in established Spanish rock zines like Ruta 66, Beaten Generation and La Musica, in which the band were compared to Mariani's DM3 and to the Dubrovniks. Sales and promotion of Rollerball Candy were lower in Australia. With no distribution deal they relied on sales at shows and through a small number of Perth and eastern states record stores. Fans in Sydney and Melbourne were unaware of the new album. At that time Running Circle's European distribution campaign was floundering. There was no evidence that the disc had was being distributed or promoted outside Spain.

Smith put together another band, Rollercoaster, to play songs which were unsuitable for the Chevelles. Teaming with Grant Ferstat (ex-Month of Sundays), Dave Shaw (of the Stems and Boom Babies) and Craig Maclean, he recorded an 11-track rock album. Smith believed it would be well received in the Spanish rock scene; it was released in mid-1999 on Spanish power pop label, Snap Records.

In mid-1996 Running Circle were bankrupt; this annulled the Chevelles' contract. Rollerball Candy had been released almost 18 months earlier and had not succeeded, through poor distribution and promotion. The band resolved to take the record back to the market. Smith contacted Paradoxx Music, a Brazilian dance music label, and negotiated for its release. An agreement was formed but the deal fell apart when Paradoxx restructured and restaffed.

The band continued to have a following in Spain. Allen and Smith played three acoustic shows in Madrid in January 1997. Later that year, after six months of sporadic playing in Perth, the band sought a new deal in Australia. David Hughes-Owen, the manager of Perth power pop label, Spinning Top, had known the band for years. Smith had offered Rollerball Candy to Hughes-Owen for Australian release back in January 1995, but at the time the label felt it did not have the money or network to support it. Spinning Top put together an Australian power pop compilation, Pop on Top, for US label Bomp! Records, using the Chevelles' "She's Not Around" as its lead track. The compilation was released in 1996 and was well received in the US, where Spinning Top discovered the Chevelles had a fan base.

=== 1997–99: At Second Glance ===
In 1997 the Chevelles and Spinning Top formed an agreement to see if the label could market Rollerball Candy. Spinning Top had an association with US label Not Lame, whose manager Bruce Brodeen was a fan of the group and accepted an offer to release some of their material. They had obtained the rights to its back catalogue so Not Lame had the choice of all tracks back to 1992. Brodeen put together a compilation, At Second Glance, concentrating on the band's melodic pop sound rather than its rock aspect.

At Second Glance was released in March 1998. The thirteen-track CD was released by Not Lame in the US and Spinning Top Records in Australia. It was the band's first release in Australia since Gigantic in 1993. Drummer Julian Buckland resigned, Dave Shaw joined the group, and the album was launched in July 1998.

It received supportive reviews in the US: Pop freelance writer Claudio Sossi wrote "The Chevelles excel at making incredibly catchy guitar-based pure pop songs without compromise." National distribution plus strong hometown reviews in Perth and radio airplay on Triple J, Triple R and community stations ensured they regained a profile in Australia. Not Lame was pleased with US sales, with the limited pressing of At Second Glance selling well in two months. It was given some airplay on college radio.

Spinning Top's European connections ensured the album reached its markets. French label Hellfire Club Records released a four-track vinyl EP, Mezmerised, which used the tougher-edged tracks from Rollerball Candy. The band was included on two compilations: Beat Party CD on Japan's One and Two Records and Pop Under the Surface on Swedish label Yesterday Girl Records.

The band organised a tour of Spain in January 1999, adding a French leg to support, Mezmerized. Most of the ten Spanish shows were sold out before the band arrived. The seven dates in France were also successful. The tour proved to the band that they were still had many fans in Europe, even though it was their first full-band tour since 1994.

=== 2000–01: Sun Bleached to Delirium ===
The Chevelles recorded seven new tracks in May 1999 – their first full studio session since Rollerball Candy some four years earlier. Three of the seven songs (including a version of Air Supply's "Lost in Love") were completed to demo level and then shopped by Spinning Top to various labels throughout Australia, Europe and the US. San Francisco label Zip Records started negotiations for a US EP and album release and advanced funds for more recordings.

Sun Bleached, a five-track EP, was released on Zip in October 2000. Zip Records' strong promotional network pushed the EP to over 300 college radio stations. Spinning Top also negotiated a deal with Zip which saw the Chevelles and other Spinning Top bands be released under the Zip Records banner in Australia through MGM Distribution.

Offers for the band to tour continued to come in and in early 2001 the band embarked on a 12-date tour of Brazil with GANGgajang and Yothu Yindi. A 20-track best-of CD titled Delirium was released in Brazil to coincide with the tour. The highlight of the successful tour was playing to a crowd of over 20,000 on the beach in Rio de Janeiro.

In mid-2001 the Chevelles were recording another new album. A deal was set up with Spanish label Bittersweet for the release of Sunseekers (a compilation of the Sunbleached EP and six new tracks, which re-appear on Girl God). Its release in late 2001 was followed by another tour of Spain in March 2002. The tour coincided with the UK release of the all-new album Girl God. Three UK dates were added to the Spanish tour and, at the request of a Brazilian radio station, two shows were booked in Brazil.

=== 2002–10: Girl God to Accelerator ===
The band launched Girl God in Australia in May 2002. The song "Get It On" from Girl God is featured as a downloadable track in Rock Band 2.

In 2008 the Chevelles signed with Little Steven's Wicked Cool Records. This deal enabled the release of an anthology album titled Barbarella Girl God - Introducing the Chevelles, which featured four new songs, and a new studio album, Accelerator. The album was recorded at the bands Atomic Garage Studio, Forensic Sound Studios and Lounge Studios in Perth

Accelerator was released in 2010. It was recorded over two recording sessions, where drum tracks were laid down by Marz "Calhoon" Frisini at Forensic Sound Studios, and then with Paul Di Renzo at Lounge Studios, Perth. The rest of the recording was done in the Chevelles studio - ATOMiC Studios, with production and mixing performed at Northbridge Sound Studios by the now late John Vilani (RIP). The album was mastered at 301 Studios by Don Bartley.

=== 2010–present ===
In 2010 The Chevelles undertook a World Tour to support the Barbarella-Girl God compilation and new album Accelerator commencing at the Big Day Out in Perth, and followed by a tour through the United States (including appearances at SXSW) and by performances in the UK, Spain and Brazil.

Again in 2011 The Chevelles undertook a 21st Anniversary Tour commencing at Southbound musical festival, and then proceeding to the U.S .(including appearances at SXSW) and other shows in the trans atlantic region of the United States and then over to Spain playing sold-out shows across the country.

Ian Tubbs was replaced on drums by long term friend and previous drummer Dave Shaw who had returned back from the East Coast during covid in 2022. The Chevelles continue to tour their beloved Spain every few years and play live shows in Australia. They also continue to demo and release new material recorded and mixed and mastered in their Fremantle Atomic Garage studio. Releases with Wicked Cool Records over the past years include the single “Bettie Page” in 2015 (co-written with Little Steven) and “Steve McQueen - I wish I was” in 2019 and “Something About You” in 2022 and their most recent fuzz soaked garage rock release "Caveman" 2025.

The band toured Spain in 2024 and 2025 (35th Anniversary Tour) and are currently recording a long awaited 7th album due for release in 2026. The new material sees them once again writing songs full of power pop riffing and 60's inspired harmonies.

The Chevelles also have an alter ego surf band "The Stingrays" for over 25 years. The Stingrays play regularly in Perth and have upcoming vinyl releases planned in 2026.

== Members ==
- Duane Smith - vocals, guitar
- Jeff Halley - bass guitar
- Adrian Allen - vocals, guitar
- Dave Shaw - drums

== Discography ==
=== Studio album ===
- Gigantic - Survival Records (1993)
- Rollerball Candy - Running Circle (1995) (Spanish-only release)
- Girl God - Zip Records (2003)
- Accelerator - Wicked Cool (2008)

=== Compilation albums ===
- The Kids Ain't Hip - Survival Records/Zero Hour (1992)
- In the Zero Hour - Munster (1993)
- At Second Glance - Not Lame/Spinning Top (March 1998)
- Delirium: The Best of the Chevelles - Tronador Records (2001)
- Sunseekers - Bittersweet Records (2002)
- Introducing the Chevelles - Barbarella Girl God - Wicked Cool (2008)

=== Live albums ===
- The Chevelles Live at the Casbah - Re:Live (12 March 2004)

=== Extended plays ===
- The Kids Ain't Hip - Zero Hour (1991)
- Memories - Survival Records (1993)
- Mesmerized - Hellfire Club (1998)
- Sun Bleached - Zip Records/Spinning Top (29 August 2000)

=== Singles ===
- "Be My Friend"/"She Don't Come Around" - Zero Hour (1990)
- "Girl For Me"/"Valentine"/"On My Mind" - Survival Records (1992)
- "Murder on Her Mind"/"Can't Pretend" - Survival Records (1992)
- "Understand"/"Over" - Survival Records (1992) (Promotional Release)
- "C'mon Everybody"/"Angelina Jolie"/"Sleeper" - Zip Records (2001)
- "Get Back to New York City" - Wicked Cool (28 June 2008) (Digital Release)
- "Bettie Page" - Wicked Cool (13 March 2012) (Digital Release)
- “Steve McQueen I Wish I Was” - Wicked Cool 2019
- “Something About You” - Wicked Cool 2022
