= Radarmaker =

Australian musical group

- Origin: Perth, Western Australia
- Genres: Art rock
- Years active: 2000-2009
- Label: Independent
- Past members: Wendi Graham; Warwick Hall; Adam Trainer; Noah Norton

Radarmaker were a Perth, Western Australia – based, Australian indie rock band, which formed in 2000 and disbanded in 2009. By 2003 the line-up was Wendi Graham, Warwick Hall, Noah Norton and Adam Trainer with song-writing duties and multiple instruments shared equally between all four members. As well as producing the band's records, local music producer Trevor Bryan Cotton has performed live with the band providing drums or bass guitar. The group's debut album, Drawn Like Spires, was released in 2006.

== History ==
Radarmaker were formed in Perth in January 2000 as an indie rock acoustic trio by Wendi Graham on guitar, drums, bass guitar, vocals, glockenspiel and ebow; Warwick Hall on guitar, glockenspiel, bass guitar and vocals; and Adam Trainer on guitar, drums, bass guitar, vocals, glockenspiel and screwdrivers. Their name references a track, "Radar Maker", on Mogwai's album Mogwai Young Team (1997). Radarmaker issued their first single "Play" in 2002, which received regular airplay on radio station RTRFM. It is co-written by Graham, Hall and Trainer.

Late in 2002 the trio expanded to an electrified quartet with Noah Norton (ex-Quasiplex) joining on guitar, drums, bass guitar and vocals. The group's five-track extended play, Aristocracy and the Horse, was released on 6 May 2005 after 15 months of recording, mixing and producing with Trevor Bryan Cotton. Steph Edwardes in Rockus rated the EP at 8.1/10, "[it] encompasses a band that are now in tune with their strengths in creating aural sketches that are direct and rudimentary, almost naïve at times, but also quite haunting and / or soothing, depending on the mood the band are aspiring to." A promotional music video for a track "Arm Versus Fiery Antenna" was directed by Norton and was nominated for a West Australian Music Industry Awards (WAMI) and a West Australian Screen Awards (WASA) as well as played on rage in 2005. The track "Hurstville 1928" received regular airplay on RTRFM while "Atlas Shrugged" was played on national youth radio Triple J's Soundlab.

The band commenced recording their debut album, Drawn Like Spires, in July 2005, with the ambition to release it before Christmas, however it was postponed to 8 July 2006 to accommodate a longer track list. They chose to again work with producer Cotton at Shogun Studios and it was mastered by local producer Neil Rabinowitz of found: quantity of sheep fame. Brian O'Neil, in dB Magazine described the album as "an interesting journey through a collection of quiet, slightly spooky songs – even if they keep the album from being as evocative as it otherwise could have been." WAM's Anthony Williams called it, "a debut album that foregrounds a love of 'indie-rock' song-form; while also boasting one of the most hauntingly beautiful, exquisitely textured, and largely instrumental (ie: 'post-rock-ish') soundscapes you're ever likely to hear." A promotional video for "Stop being a Wanker" was released and broadcast on rage, it was directed by Norton and edited by Graham.

Trainer took a gap year to travel across Europe. During the first half of 2007 Radarmaker's few performances was as a three-piece, Graham, Hall and Norton. They intended to start full-time gigging and writing new material in August upon Trainer's return. In an interview with base.ad band members indicated they would tour Australia's east coast and then over to Spain. In that interview they speculated that their next studio venture may take place in Japan. Despite those ambitions the group disbanded in 2009. Graham and Norton later performed as a duet Balthazar, while Trainer transitioned towards noise-orientated solo projects. In 2016, after seven years, Radarmaker, as a four-piece, undertook a one-off reformation for RTRFM's "In the Pines" concert at University of Western Australia's Somerville Auditorium.

== Discography ==
=== Albums ===
- Drawn Like Spires (8 July 2006)
1. "Balthazaar"
2. "Shallow Socialites (Battle the Axe)"
3. "Clodhopper"
4. "Gary Oldman"
5. "Matabo Elektrwerkzeuge"
6. "Squibbon"
7. "Sashegyi"
8. "Stop being a Wanker"
9. "Domovoi"
10. "Toaster"
11. "Whoop Tuffet"
12. "Ogden's Cormorant"
13. "Trees of Greenland"

=== Extended plays ===
- Aristocracy and the Horse (6 May 2005)
1. "Atlas Shrugged"
2. "Arm versus Fiery Antenna"
3. "Deliquesce"
4. "Rusalka"
5. "Hurstville 1928"

=== Singles ===
- "Play" (2002)

== Influences ==
Radarmaker take their name from the Mogwai song "Radar Maker", although Mogwai's influence on Radarmaker's sound diminished over later years. Other influences are Sonic Youth, Yo La Tengo and Do Make Say Think. "Atlas Shrugged" was believed to be named after the 1957 novel by Ayn Rand, however, Graham has since stated that she hates the book.

== Members ==
- Wendi Graham – guitar, drums, bass guitar, vocals, glockenspiel, ebow 2000–2009
- Warwick Hall – guitar, glockenspiel, bass guitar, vocals 2000–2009
- Adam Trainer – guitar, drums, bass guitar, vocals, glockenspiel, screwdrivers 2000–2007, 2008–2009
- Noah Norton – guitar, drums, bass guitar, vocals 2002–2009

Touring members

- Trevor Bryan Cotton – drums, bass guitar (fl. 2005–2006)

== See also ==
- List of post-rock bands
