= The Chemist (band) =

Australian musical group

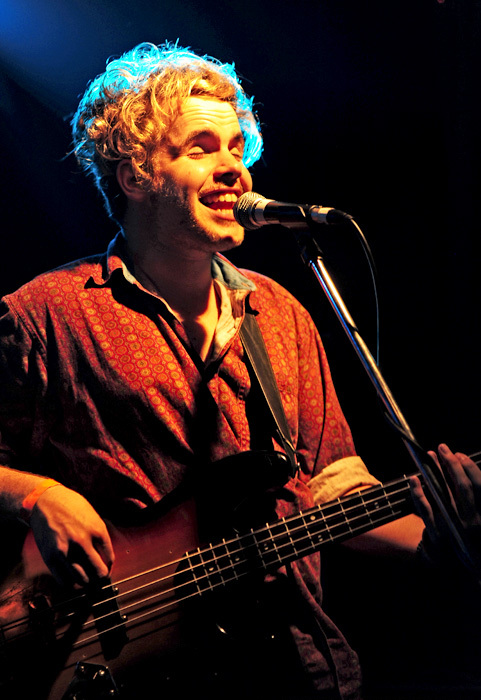

Background information
- Origin: Perth, Western Australia, Australia
- Genres: Indie rock, blues, folk,
- Years active: 2007–2013
- Label: Create/Control
- Members: Ben Witt; Chris Wright; James Ireland; Hamish Rahn
- Past members: Elliot Smith
- Website: www.thechemistband.com.au

The Chemist were an Australian alternative rock music band from Perth, Western Australia formed in 2007.

== History ==
The Chemist formed when all four members met studying music at university. The Chemist's first gig was a heat in the prestigious Next Big Thing Competition. They won their heat and ended up runners-up in the entire competition.

They've since played at the Big Day Out, Splendor in the Grass, Southbound, received significant airplay on Triple J, worked with Luke Steele of the Sleepy Jackson and supported Silversun Pickups, Robert Forster, Boy & Bear, Hungry Kids of Hungary, The Beautiful Girls, End of Fashion, Birds of Tokyo and Sugar Army.

In 2013, The Chemist signed to Create/Control and released their debut album Ballet In The Badlands on March 22. The album was given 4/5 stars by Rolling Stone magazine.

== Music style ==
The Chemist play a derivative brand of blues infused indie swamp rock, drawing influence from artists such as Tom Waits, Bob Dylan, The Walkmen, The Beach Boys, and Beck.

== Personnel ==
- Ben Witt – lead vocals, lead guitar, keyboard (2007–present)
- Elliot Smith – drums (2007-2012)
- Chris Wright: drums (2012–present)
- James Ireland – keyboard (2007–present)
- Hamish Rahn – bass (2007–present)

== Discography ==
=== Albums ===
List of albums, with selected details
Title	Details
Ballet in the Badlands	Released: 2013; Format: CD, Digital; Label: Dirt Diamonds (DDPTC004)

=== Extended Plays ===
List of EPs, with selected details
Title	Details
The Wolves' Howls Shatter the Old Glass Moon	Released: 2010; Format: CD, Digital; Label: Dirt Diamonds (5186593222)
Lullabies	Released: 2010; Format: CD, Digital; Label: Dirt Diamonds (5249826082)
