= Grafton Primary =

Australian electro-noir band

- Origin: Sydney, New South Wales, Australia
- Genres: New wave, synth-pop, electronica
- Years active: 2006–present
- Label: Independent
- Members: Benjamin Garden; Joshua Garden

Grafton Primary is an Australian electro-noir band from Sydney. The band consists of brothers Benjamin and Joshua Garden who attended primary school in Grafton, New South Wales. They select drummers and bass players for live shows. Grafton Primary has independently released an EP, Relativity (2007), and two albums, Eon (2008) and Neo (2013). The group has been picked up by Triple J and has toured widely.

== Members ==
- Joshua Garden – Vocals
- Benjamin Garden – Keyboards, synthesizer and programming

== Discography ==
=== Studio albums ===
Title	Details	Peak chart positions
Title	Details	AUS (Hit Seekers)
Eon	Released: October 2008; Label: Resolution Music (RESGP009); Format: CD, digital download	5
Neo	Released: 2013; Label: Grafton Primary; Format: digital download	-

=== Extended plays ===
Title	Details
Relativity	Released: 2007; Label: Resolution Music (RESGP004); Format: CD

=== Singles ===
Year	Title	Album
2008	"She Knows It"	Eon
2008	"Relativity"	non album singles
2008	"I Can Cook"	non album singles
2009	"All Stars"	non album singles
2010	"The Eagle"	non album singles
2012	"When the Evolution Comes"	non album singles
2017	"The Silence"	non album singles

== Awards and nominations ==
=== AIR Awards ===
The Australian Independent Record Awards (commonly known informally as AIR Awards) is an annual awards night to recognise, promote and celebrate the success of Australia's Independent Music sector.

Year	Nominee / work	Award	Result
2008	Relativity	Best Independent Single/EP	Nominated
2008	Relativity	Best Independent Dance/Electronic Album	Nominated
