= Will Stoker and the Embers =

Australian band

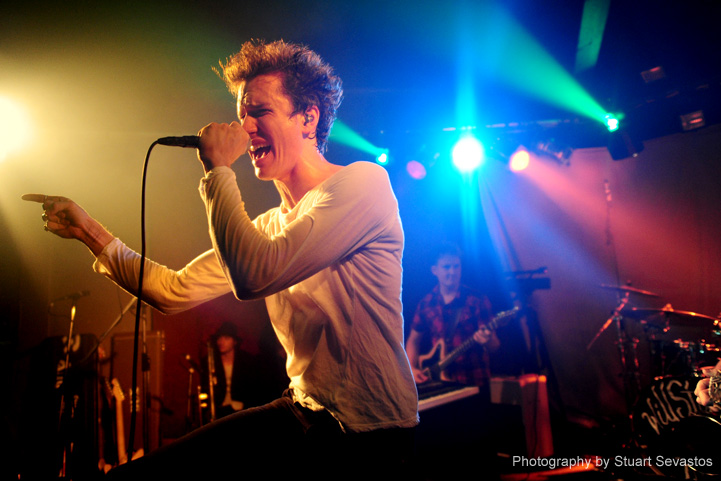

Background information
- Origin: Perth, Western Australia, Australia
- Years active: 2005, 2007–present
- Label: Shock
- Members: Gareth Bevan; Ashley Doodkorte; Will Stoker; Dylan Szymkow; Anthony Jackson
- Past members: Luke Dux; Ryan Dux; Russell Loasby; Brett Murray; Tahlia Palmer; Benjamin Roberts; Kynan Tan
- Website: willstoker.com

Will Stoker and the Embers are an Australian band based in Perth, Western Australia fronted by singer/songwriter/multi-instrumentalist Will Stoker. In 2007 they won the Western Australian final of the National Campus Band Competition and then went to Melbourne to win the national final. They have also received a public voted nomination for Favourite Newcomer at the West Australian Music Industry Association awards 2009. Guitarist Luke Dux and Bassist Ryan Dux also won industry voted awards for Best Guitarist and Best Bassist respectively.

== History ==
=== 2005-2009: Formation and Five Beds for Bitsy ===
The first incarnation of Will Stoker and the Embers took place in 2005 consisting of Will Stoker on vocals and guitar, Benjamin Roberts a.k.a. Benny Revolver (Benny Revolver and the Blanks) on bass and Ashley Doodkorte (Pyromesh) on drums, playing a few gigs before Stoker left Perth for Melbourne. Returning to Perth in 2007, Stoker reformed the band with the addition of Brett Murray (The Wire Complex) on keyboards and entered the band in the Next Big Thing band competition and the National Campus Band Competition. The band made it to the final of the 2007 Next Big Thing competition

After a line-up change – Kynan Tan (The Vice-Chancellors) and Gareth Bevan (Brainhorn) filling in for the departing Murray – the band won the State final of the National Campus Bands Competition and then travelled to Melbourne, winning the National Final.

Will Stoker and the Embers played at the Perth leg of the 2008 Big Day Out on the local produce stage. In March 2008 they followed this by opening the West Coast Blues & Roots Festival in Fremantle and playing at RTRFM's 'In The Pines' concert in April 2008. Tan left the band due to creative differences and Roberts also left around the same time. They were replaced by Luke Dux on guitar (The Floors, Timothy Nelson and the Infidels) and Ryan Dux on bass (The Floors, The Kill Devil Hills).

The band's first release, the Five Beds for Bitsy EP was self-released in November 2008, and distributed through Shock Records. Tours on the east coast of Australia followed. The "Five Beds for Bitsy" music video shot by Perth filmmaker Mat De Koning received national airplay on ABC TV's Rage programme and was an entrant in the 2009 St Kilda Film Festival. The band opened the second day of the 2009 Southbound Festival in Busselton after winning the Stagebound band competition. Will Stoker and the Embers also opened the first Perth St Jeromes Laneway Festival in February 2009.

=== 2010-present: Debut album ===
Will Stoker and the Embers recorded their debut album after receiving a Department of Culture and the Arts recording grant in January 2010. The album was released on 16 April 2010 with a launch show at the Rosemount Hotel.

The self-titled album has gained widely positive reviews from street press and online music review websites. The album has also proved popular with illegal download and file-sharing websites.

The first single to be released from the debut album, "The King", received airplay on national youth radio station, Triple J. The accompanying music video was shot by Mat De Koning with Paul Donnelly and Mat Doust with the band in an old abandoned music cinema in the Perth CBD on 14 March 2010.

Luke and Ryan Dux won 'Best Guitarist' and 'Best Bassist' respectively at the 2010 West Australian Music Industry Awards. Stoker was nominated in the 'Best Male Vocalist' category, but failed to win.

The band supported Kasabian at Thebarton Theatre in Adelaide as part of Kasabian's July 2010 Australian Tour, before travelling to Melbourne to launch their album on the east coast of Australia at The Tote in Collingwood. Will Stoker and the Embers supported The Charlatans for the last gig of the later band's 2010 Australian Tour.

In January 2011 Luke and Ryan Dux announced they would be leaving the band leading to a brief hiatus. During this time Stoker focussed on solo material.

In March 2012 the hiatus was broken when Anthony Jackson (ex-Birds of Tokyo) and Dylan Szymkow (Nexus, Thee Gold Blooms) joined the band. Will Stoker and the Embers returned to the live circuit and are working on the follow-up album to 2010's self-titled debut

== Members ==
=== Current ===
- Will Stoker — vocals, guitar, keyboards, piano, clarinet, boot
- Ashley Doodkorte — drums, percussion, cheesewheel
- Gareth Bevan — guitar, keyboards, vocals
- Dylan Szymkow — guitar, hutchence
- Anthony Jackson — bass

=== Former ===
- Luke Dux — guitar, vocals
- Ryan Dux — bass
- Russell Loasby — drums (occasional fill-in)
- Martin 'Kim Jong-un' Gonzalez — bass (occasional fill-in)
- Benjamin Roberts — bass
- Brett Murray — keyboards
- Kynan Tan — guitar, keyboard, vocals
- Tahlia Palmer — percussion, vocals, vibe, camera

== Discography ==
=== Studio albums ===
Title	Details
Will Stoker & The Embers	Released: 16 April 2010; Label: Shock Records; Format: CD, digital download

=== Extended plays ===
Title	Details
Five Beds for Bitsy	Released: 1 November 2008; Label: Will Stoker and the Embers (WILL001); Format: CD, digital download
