= Charlotte's Web (band) =

Australian Indie pop band

- Also known as: Catherine Wheels
- Origin: Perth, Western Australia
- Genres: Indie pop, rock
- Years active: 1986–1991
- Labels: Easter; CW; Mighty Boy; MDS; Dada
- Past members: see Members list

Charlotte's Web were an Australian indie pop band, formed in Perth, Western Australia, briefly as Catherine Wheels, in 1986 with mainstay Jeffery Lowe on vocals and guitar. The band released Flies in the Face of... on cassette in January 1988 and Short Time Strait as an EP in February 1991 before disbanding later that year.

== Biography ==
Catherine Wheels was originally formed by Jeff Lowe (vocals, guitar) and Tim Underwood (guitar) in 1986 in Perth, Western Australia. Lowe and Underwood had played in The Russians (1984–1986), with Darryl Edwards (drums) and Richard Galli (bass guitar, keyboards). Catherine Wheels performed as a drummerless two piece, before adding Greta Little and Chad Hedley as their rhythm section (bass guitar and drums respectively), under the name Catherine Wheels, in 1986. The band performed infrequently around Perth for about a year, releasing a single, "Big Letdown" in February 1987, before they relocated to Sydney, where Underwood, Little and Hedley left to form a new band, Northern Lights. Lowe returned to Perth and conscripted Will Akers (The Triffids) on bass guitar and Felicity 'Flick' Dear (Holy Rollers) on drums and Craig Chisholm (Holy Rollers) on lead/rhythm guitar to form a new version of Charlotte's Web in February 1987. This lineup lasted until Akers felt that he could no longer physically cope with playing in the band and was replaced by Mandy Haines. The band toured the northwest of the state at the end of 1987 and earned enough money to record Flies in the Face of..., at Poon's Head studios in Perth, which was released in January 1988 as a cassette.

In September 1988 Haines joined The Pallisades and moved to Sydney, at the same time Chisholm decided to travel to Europe. As a result Michal Zampogna (Circle of Confusion) took over on bass guitar, and Laurie Mansell (I Hear an Army), who originally auditioned as a bass player, replaced Chisolm on lead/rhythm duties. The band then expanded with the addition of John Bannister on trumpet and Kym Skipworth on cello. The band released a second single, "Heart Trouble", on local independent label, Mighty Boy, in 1989. The single receiving airplay on Triple J. In August 1990 Mark Rettig joined the band and with the line-up of Lowe, Mansell, Zampogna, Skipworth and Dear released an EP, Short Time Strait. The EP was produced by Dom Mariani (ex-The Stems, The Someloves, DM3).

=== Post Charlotte ===
After the Northern Lights, Underwood went on to form The Rosemary Beads, with Little (bass) and Cam Munachen (drums).

Dear went on to play drums with Wooden Fische, Box and Butternut. As from 2006, Dear was the principal of Djidi Djidi Aboriginal School in Bunbury and played in a Noongar band called Warangka.

Lowe, Skipworth together with drummer Nathan Jarvis (ex-Bob's Lovechild) formed The Indian Givers, following the disbanding of Charlotte's Web. Skipworth stopped performing after she and Lowe were involved in a car accident in May, 1992. She went on to work for ABC Television as a designer and is now a Registered Vet Nurse.

Zampogna worked at RTRFM, Community Television and as the President of Animal Liberation (WA) Inc.

== Members ==
- Will Akers – bass guitar, backing vocals (1987)
- John Bannister – trumpet (1987–1990)
- Craig Chisolm – guitar, backing vocals (1987–1988)
- Felicity 'Flick' Dear – drums, vocals, flute (1987–1991)
- Mandy Haines – bass guitar (1987–1988)
- Chad Hedley – drums (1986–1987)
- Greta Little – bass guitar (1986–1987)
- Jeffery Lowe – vocals, guitar (1986–1991)
- Laurie Mansell – guitar, backing vocals (1988–1991)
- Mark Rettig – trumpet (1990–1991)
- Kym Skipworth – cello, tambourine (1989–1990)
- Cathi Smith – viola (1991)
- Tim Underwood – guitar (1986–1987)
- Michael Zampogna – bass guitar (1988–1991)

== Discography ==
=== Albums/EPs ===
- Flies in the Face of... – CW (independent label) (January 1988, cassette)
- Short Time Strait – MDS / Dada Records (CW001) (February 1991, EP)

=== Singles ===
- "Big Letdown"/"Dance of the Chimney Sweeps"/"Delicious Pain" – Easter Records (MR-7030) (February 1987)
- "Heart Trouble"/"Alice's Wings" – Mighty Boy Records (February 1990)

=== Compilations ===
- Hometown Farewell Kiss – 6UVS (1990) ("Servant of Your Lair")
- Like Flies in the Face of – ("Big Letdown")
- Something's Burning in Paradise Again – Subtle Records (C-86) (November 1989) ("The Train for June")
