= Love Pump =

Australian musical group

- Origin: Perth, Western Australia, Australia
- Genres: Rock, alternative
- Years active: 1985–1987 & 1991
- Past members: refer Members list
- Website: Official website

Love Pump was an Australian rock band popular in Perth, Western Australia in the 1980s. They were part of a renaissance of Western Australian performing acts that developed during this period, in the wake of the international punk rock and new wave movements – in isolation from the mainstream rock industry in Australia. This unique local musical culture has not been well documented or fully appreciated by histories of Australian popular music, tending to emphasise the culture of the 'Eastern States' – a cultural dichotomy that still exists in Australia today.

Perth was notable for having a vibrant musical scene that developed in isolation, being separated by many thousands of kilometres of desert from the other side of the continent – a geographical isolation that established a distinct cultural isolation and independence. This led to the development of a unique musical culture that modelled itself upon eclectic international musical influences, whilst developing a distinct sense of regional identity.

== Biography ==
=== Early years (1985–1986) ===
Love Pump was formed in 1985 by art-school friends Val Tarin (drums, vocals), Peter Morse (bass), Thomas Kayser (keyboards), Rodney Glick (rhythm guitar) and Fred Gilbert (vocals). In need of a lead singer and guitarist, Trevor Hilton (lead vocals and guitar) was invited to join – and soon became the principal songwriter of the group. The impulse behind the band was a set of common musical interests that ranged from experimental audio work to popular music parody. An earlier group, The Armchair (1984) had involved most of these performers – an avant-garde music sound performance group that used built and found instruments, along the lines of Einstürzende Neubauten. Having recognised the limited audience for noise performance, despite a cult following, the members of the band decided to terminate the group. Love Pump was formed as an explicitly 1970s pop satire group – a postmodern parody of the musical culture prevalent at the time.

=== Early Recordings (1985–1986) ===
Love Pump released the audio cassette, Moist, in 1987, with cover art by the Western Australian painter Tom Alberts. The album was recorded at two local Perth studios in March and November 1986. In the 1990s, the original digital mix-down masters were found and the album remastered for CD. Because the tracks were originally mixed down onto a VHS tape using digital encoding, it enabled the new CD master to be much cleaner than the original 1/4" analog reels that originally became the final edited masters used for the cassette in the 1986.

Love Pump played to large audiences at a variety of venues in Perth, building up a regular following, both as a headline act and as support to groups such as The Triffids.

The members of the band were, and in many cases continue to be, involved in performance-related activities in Western Australia and in other parts of the world. The networked nature of the band was typical of the Perth music scene during this time, in which artists moved between bands and projects frequently and fruitfully. This feature of the Perth music scene is well documented in the 'Post-Punk to Post-Funk' family tree published in Party Fears 10 (Autumn, 1989) – which clearly delineates the movement of musicians between bands of the time, forming different ensembles and experimenting with a wide range of musical styles. Members of Love Pump were central to the wide variety of bands that formed around this period, including 'Rhythm Method', 'Hugo Au Go-Go', 'Floating Garden', 'The Armchair', 'The Waltons', 'Just Add Water' and 'German Humour', among many others. All of these bands made recordings on cassette, single or LP, as well as experimenting with the new medium of the independent rock music video clip.

Love Pump dissolved in 1987, playing their last gig at the Shenton Park Hotel – having become tired of the 'parody' band label and later formed The Fat – a funk ensemble that performed between 1988 and 1993

=== Reformation (1991) ===
Love Pump reformed in November 1991 to play a handful of shows in Fremantle and Perth.

== Members ==
- Guy Crommelin (Hugh Schlong) – bass (1987)
- Fred Gilbert (Ron Pickett) (1985–1991)
- Rodney Glick (Hot Rod) – guitar (1985–1987)
- Peter Hadley (Tiger Turbo) – bass (1986–1987)
- Trevor Hilton (Big Jim) – lead vocals, guitar (1985–1987, 1991)
- Peter Hobbs (Snake) – guitar, vocals (1987)
- Thomas Kayser (Shaft Steele) – keyboards, vocals (1985–1987)
- Peter Morse (Dolph Subway) – bass (1985–1986, 1991)
- Val Tarin (Val Hung) – drums, guitar, bass, vocals (1985–1987, 1991)
- Craig Weighell (Rim Shot) – drums (1986–1987)
- Adrian Wood (Whip Creme) – trumpet, vocals (1986–1987)
- Manoli Vouyoulalos – bass (1987)

== Discography ==
=== Albums ===
- Live at the Wizbah Volume 1 (1986)
- Live at the Wizbah Volume 2 (1986)
- Live at the Wizbah Volume 3 (1986)
- Moist (1987)
- Live at the Shents (1987)

=== Compilation albums ===
- The Fred Gilbert Story (1987)
- Hometown Farewell Kiss – 6UVS (1990)
