= Carus Thompson =

Australian singer-songwriter

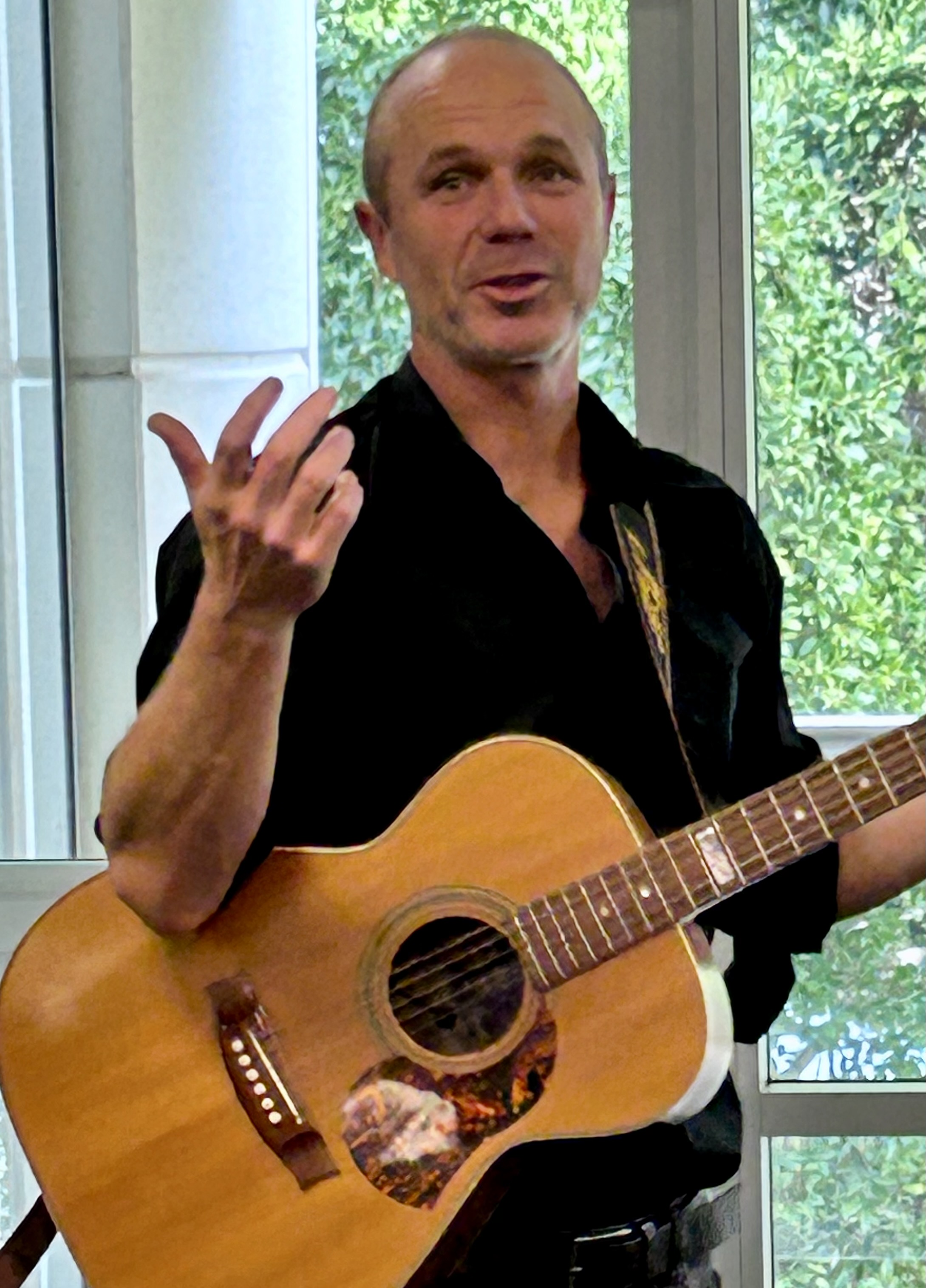
- Thompson in May 2023

Background information
- Born: Perth, Western Australia, Australia
- Genres: Reggae; countryfolk; rock; funk; groove
- Occupations: Musician, songwriter
- Instruments: Vocals, guitar
- Years active: 1995–present
- Website: carusthompson.com

Carus Thompson is an Australian singer-songwriter from Perth, Western Australia. From 1995 to 2008, he performed under the title Carus and The True Believers before going solo with the group disbanding. Thompson has released four studio albums, Creatures of Habit (2009), Caravan (2011), Island (2017) and Shakespeare Avenue (2019).

== Career ==
=== 1995–2008: Carus and The True Believers ===
In 1995, 18-year-old Thompson formed Carus and The True Believers. They began performing on the local pub circuit, often for four or five nights a week. Thompson lists Paul Kelly as one of his early influences. The group supported local performances by Australian artists, Mick Thomas (of Weddings Parties Anything), Ed Kuepper and Neil Murray.

In 2000 Carus and the True Believers released their self-titled first extended play. In 2002, they released their second EP Mind's Eye and began touring interstate.

In December 2002, Carus and the True Believers, with the line-up of Thompson, Paul Keenan on drums and Noel Manyam on bass guitar, recorded their debut studio album, Songs from Martin St., in Melbourne's Martin Street Studios. It was released in February 2003, which Thompson co-produced with his brother, Christian Thompson, and includes guest performances by Vikki Simpson (of the Waifs) on vocals and John Butler (of the John Butler Trio) on guitar. It has an eclectic mix of rock, reggae and folk styling, which reached number 18 on the Australian Independent Records chart. The group relocated to Melbourne. Paul Keenen left and Thompson recruited Jason McGann on drums. The album established the trio in the new roots-folk scene, they followed with a national tour and then a tour of Europe.

Thompson gave a solo performance at Fremantle's Norfolk Hotel, which was recorded by engineer James Hewgill (worked for the Waifs), and was released as a double live album, Acoustic at the Norfolk, in October 2003. It has Thompson either solo on lead vocals and acoustic guitar or accompanied by Adam Gare on violin and Dave Johnson on harmonies and mandolin.

In April 2004, Long Nights are Gone, the second studio album by Carus and the True Believers was recorded in one day in Fremantle with half the songs written and recorded on the same day.

In 2005, Carus and the True Believers released a five-track EP, Breakdown (2005). The line-up joining Thompson, Johnston and Gare were Ben Franz on bass guitar and Howle Johnstone on drums and percussion,. In May 2007, the band released their third studio album, Three Boxes and disbanded in 2008.

=== 2008–present: Solo ===
Thompson released his debut solo album, Creature of Habit, in March 2009, and followed with Caravan in 2011.

His third solo album Island was released in February 2017. Tex Miller of Forté magazine rated it at four-and-a-half out of five and explained, "Brilliant riffs, honest heartfelt lyrics and an element that is sure to have you singing along with a smile in no time."

== Discography ==
=== Studio albums ===
| Title | Details |
|---|---|
| Songs from Martin St. (as Carus and the True Believers) | Released: February 2003; Label: Carus Thompson; Format: CD |
| Long Nights Are Gone (as Carus and the True Believers) | Released: 2004; Label: Carus Thompson (CAR006); Format: CD, digital download |
| Three Boxes (as Carus and the True Believers) | Released: May 2007; Label: Carus Thompson (CAR008); Format: CD, digital download |
| Creatures of Habit | Released: March 2009; Label: Carus Thompson (CAR009); Format: 2xCD, digital download |
| Caravan | Released: April 2011; Label: Carus Thompson (CAR010); Format: 2xCD, digital download |
| Island | Released: February 2017; Label: Carus Thompson; Format: CD, digital download |
| Shakespeare Avenue | Released: 4 October 2019; Label: Carus Thompson; Format: CD, digital download |

=== Live albums ===
| Title | Details |
|---|---|
| Acoustic at the Norfolk | Released: October 2003; Label: Carus Thompson (CAR005); Format: 2xCD; Recorded June 2003 |
| Cover Tapes | Released: 2008; Label: Valve Records (7087); Format: CD; Recorded: 7 June 2008 |
| Acoustic at the Norfolk - Volume II | Released: July 2012; Label: Carus Thompson (CAR011); Format: 2xCD, Digital download; Recorded January 2012 |

=== Extended plays ===
| Title | Details |
|---|---|
| Carus | Released: 2000; Format: CD |
| Mind's Eye | Released: 2002; Label: Carus Thompson (CAR003); Format: CD |
| The Breakdown EP (as Carus and the True Believers) | Released: 2005; Label: Carus Thompson (CAR007); Format: CD |

== Awards ==
=== AIR Awards ===
The Australian Independent Record Awards (commonly known informally as AIR Awards) is an annual awards night to recognise, promote and celebrate the success of Australia's Independent Music sector.

| Year | Nominee / work | Award | Result |
|---|---|---|---|
| 2009 | Creature of Habit | Best Independent Blues and Roots Album | Nominated |

=== WAM Song of the Year ===
The WAM Song of the Year was formed by the Western Australian Rock Music Industry Association Inc. (WARMIA) in 1985, with its main aim to develop and run annual awards recognising achievements within the music industry in Western Australia.

| Year | Nominee / work | Award | Result (wins only) |
|---|---|---|---|
| 2017/18 | "Lies" | Blues / Roots Song of the Year | Won |
