= Tod Johnston =

Australian musician and media personality

- Born: Sydney, New South Wales, Australia
- Occupations: Radio voice; television host; musician; songwriter; entertainer
- Family: Jill Perryman (mother)
- Website: todjohnston.com

Tod Johnston is an Australian entertainer, radio and television personality, presenter and musician.

== Early life ==
Johnson was born in Sydney, the son of actress and singer Jill Perryman and choreographer Kevan Johnston. After leaving school, he studied at Murdoch University where he gained a degree in environmental science. It was from here that he was introduced to the live music arena.

== Career ==
In the 1980s, Johnston was the lead singer of a popular band V Capri in Perth, Western Australia.

He has appeared on a number of television shows, starting in the early 1990s at Network Ten as a presenter on Airplay, Kid's Company and presenting weekend weather reports. In the late 1990s he worked at Channel Nine Perth as weather presenter and hosted a segment on the network's variety show, In Melbourne Tonight, where he also appeared as a guest vocalist. Later he was a guest host on Postcards WA. He also worked for the Nine Network Australia as presenter for the series Wine Me Dine Me.

Internationally, he can be seen on a regular basis on GMTV Breakfast Television in the United Kingdom live from Australia.

In 2003, Johnston was the afternoon presenter at 720 ABC Perth radio, replacing Verity James while she was on long service leave. He hosted Saturday afternoons and Sunday afternoons with his own radio show, The Big Weekend, on Perth talkback radio station 6PR.

Johnston works in music and entertainment and is in demand as a master of ceremonies throughout Australia. He has a working band, Tod Johnston & PeaceLove, as well as the jazz combo in the Lounge with Sue Bluck.

In January 2021, 6PR announced that Johnston would take over from Chris Ilsley to host the station's evening program The Nightshift.
