= Abbe May =

Australian musician and human rights campaigner (born 1983)

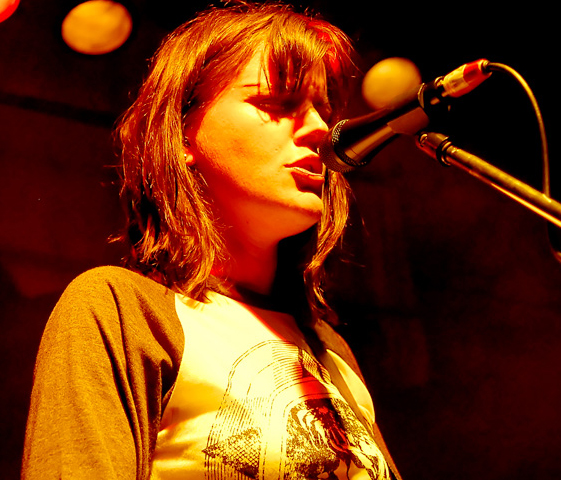
- May in August 2008

Background information
- Born: Abbe Joanna May; 19 July 1983 (age 43); Subiaco, Western Australia, Australia
- Origin: Bunbury, Western Australia, Australia
- Genres: Rock, dance, electronic, pop
- Occupations: Singer-songwriter, musician, human rights campaigner
- Instruments: Bass guitar, guitar, synthesiser, vocals
- Years active: 2000–present
- Label: Independent
- Website: abbemay.com

Abbe Joanna May (born 19 July 1983) is an Australian singer-songwriter, musician and human rights campaigner. From 2002 she pursued her music career in Perth-based groups, The Fuzz, Abbe May and the Rockin' Pneumonia, and The Devil & Abbe May. In 2010 she began to perform as Abbe May and released her solo album, Design Desire, in July 2011. She followed with Kiss My Apocalypse in May 2013. At the ARIA Music Awards of 2013, May was nominated for Best Female Artist for her album. May has been nominated for a total 27 (winning 21) West Australian Music Industry awards since 2008.

== Life and career ==
Abbe Joanna May was born on 19 July 1983 in Subiaco, a Perth suburb. She grew up in Bunbury, a port city 175 kilometres (109 mi) south of the capital. Her mother taught English literature. May has an older brother, Douglas May (born ca. 1980). She attended a local Catholic school. Abbe spent her late teens and early twenties performing in rock venues and studios across Australia, touring around the country in various solo and band incarnations. Throughout her career, Abbe has been an ARIA, WAM, AIR, AMP winning and nominated artist and a dedicated member of the LGBTIQA+ community.

By 2002, she had moved back to Perth to further her career in music and performed lead vocals in a music group, The Fuzz, alongside her brother, KT Rumble (aka Douglas May), on lead guitar. The Fuzz had been formed by Douglas with Jiah Fishenden on guitar, Shayne Macri on bass guitar and Ben Mountford on drums. One of their early tracks, "The Bomb", which was co-written by May with her bandmates, won the Western Australian final of national radio station, Triple J's Unearthed competition in October 2002.

The Fuzz issued two extended plays, Dead on the Road (2004) and Take the Money (November 2004), and a studio album, 100 Demons (8 August 2005). In October 2005 Dylan McCardle reviewed their CD launch of the latter for PerthSounds.com, which was "a return to simple but powerful formula that is rock 'n' roll ... a night where female vocalists came to the fore, and Abbe May is certainly amongst the cream of the crop. She gave 110% percent with her vocals, she jumped up and down the stage like a woman possessed".

By 2006, May (on lead vocals and guitar) had formed an "electric blues" group, Abbe May and the Rockin' Pneumonia, with Douglas, joined by Alex Archer on violin; Todd Pickett on percussion and vocals; Alien Smith; and Pete Stone on bass guitar. They issued a self-titled EP in that year and followed with an album, Howl & Moan in April 2008.

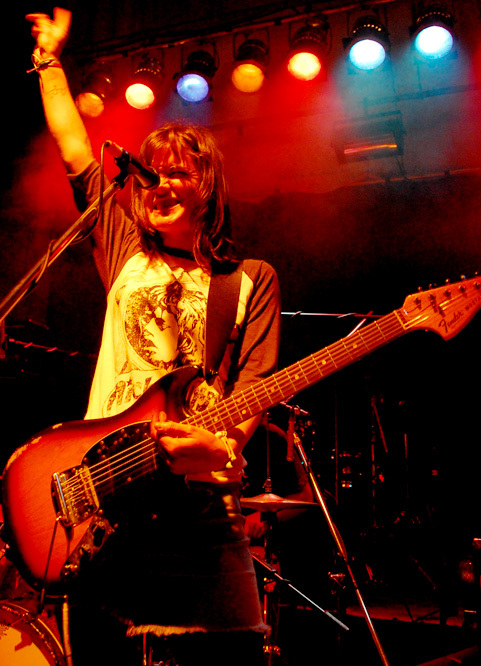
May performing with the Rockin' Pneumonia at the Fly by Night Musicians' Club in Fremantle during August 2008.

Abbe May and the Rockin' Pneumonia released a second EP, Hawaiian Disease, in June 2009. For that disc May supplied lead vocals; wah, delay and slide guitars; and a 70's drum machine. The Sydney Morning Herald's reviewer, Bernard Zuel, found the EP was another "hugely impressive release" from "Perth's blues-rock guitarist/tear-down-the-walls singer"; he cited her description of the title track, "Every line is a euphemism for oral sex. I've been collecting sex slang over the years and I've got this great dictionary of sex slang, too, as well as having a general interest in all things sleazy".

In 2008, she formed a side project, The Devil & Abbe May, which was a "more country blues outfit", with Douglas, Archer, Pickett and Stone, joined by David Craft on vocals and harmonica; and Jesse Woodward on banjo and bass guitar. This group issued an album, Hoodoo You Do in that year. Amazon's editorial review declares "[it] is a shambolic voodoo blues album that is both hauntingly beautiful and disarmingly humorous. A five star album from a five star eccentric".

From 2010, Abbe May performed under her own name and released her debut solo album, Design Desire, in July 2011. Zuel noted that May is "drawing from urban and country blues rather than pub rock boogie, riding on swing rather than just thrust, wearing its open sexiness lightly and its wicked humour comfortably" and she had delivered "a rock album smarter and tougher than the rest". According to May it is "about love and lust and the mysteries and miseries that accompany those things. I didn't consciously sit down and decide to write about these themes but I guess they were playing on my mind at the time of writing these songs".

May released another album, Kiss My Apocalypse, in May 2013. Cate Summers at theMusic.com.au felt May had "made a swift U-turn on her previously guitar-heavy style, and this new album highlights her subsequent transition towards what she’s labeled 'doom pop'". Mess+Noise's Kate Hennessey noted that May is "strong, talented, irreverent and sexual; aspects of being a woman that are so rarely role-modeled in a holistic way – or in a way that talks to me – that I want to defend her against comments that seem irritatingly reductive" and despite some fans' fears that "ditching the blues muse and aspiring to a mainstream pop aesthetic would leach her authenticity. The opposite occurs ... By snipping ties to the blues' ground-bound earthiness, May’s self-expression can – and has – soared, and she's transmitting more personally than ever". At the ARIA Music Awards of 2013 May was nominated for Best Female Artist for Kiss My Apocalypse.

On 2 February 2018, Abbe released her fifth studio album, Fruit. Music critic Bernard Zuel said that the album is, "one of the important albums of 2018." Spending four years on its creation, Fruit boasts a melodic, upbeat and soulful collection of songs. Caitlin Welsh from The Australian states that, "Fruit settles comfortably into its themes... the thrill of being direct about what you want and who you are." It is her most succinct and powerful declaration of identity yet. Australian digital radio station site Double J said, "Abbe May has been open about this record being her first after coming out, and these short, oblique moments add plenty to that narrative. She speaks of 'private shame' she felt through her life, presumably about her sexuality, before 'Seventeen' reveals intimate details of her life in love." Giving the album four stars, The Newcastle Herald stated that it "is the Perth singer – songwriter's most accomplished piece of art." Fruit also received a four – star rating from The Music stating that Fruit, "boasts the kind of sophisticated songwriting an artist like Prince might once have been responsible for." "Seventeen" is the latest single from Fruit which debut at #1 on the Australian Independent Record Labels Association's 100% Independent Album Chart.

== Discography ==
=== Studio albums ===
Title	Details
Howl & Moan (by Abbe May and the Rockin' Pneumonia)	Released: 26 April 2008; Label: Abbe May (AM001); Format: CD, digital download
Hoodoo You Do (by Abbe May and the Rockin' Pneumonia)	Released: January 2009; Label: Abbe May (AM002); Format: CD, digital download
Design Desire	Released: 8 July 2011; Label: Source Music (SMM025); Format: CD, digital download
Kiss My Apocalypse	Released: 10 May 2013; Label: Abbe May (AM004); Format: CD, digital download
Fruit	Released: 2 February 2018; Label: Luxury Cat Records ( LCRFRUIT001); Format: CD, LP, digital download

=== Extended plays ===
Title	Details
Abbe May and the Rockin' Pneumonia (by Abbe May and the Rockin' Pneumonia)	Released: 2006
Hawaiian Disease (by Abbe May and the Rockin' Pneumonia)	Released: 5 June 2009; Label: Abbe May (AM003); Format: CD, digital download

=== Singles ===
Title	Year	Album
"Costanza"	2008	Howl & Moan
"Mammalian Locomotion"	2010	Design Desire
"Design Desire"	2011	Design Desire
"Karmaggedon"	2012	Kiss My Apocalypse
"T.R.O.U.B.L.E."	2013	Kiss My Apocalypse
"Sex Tourettes"	2013	Kiss My Apocalypse
"Perth Girls" / "Total Control"	2013	Kiss My Apocalypse
"Are We Flirting"	2016	Fruit
"Doomsday Clock" (featuring Joni in the Moon, Odette Mercy)	2016	Fruit
"Like Me Like I Like You"	2017	Fruit
"Love Decline"	2017	Fruit
"Seventeen"	2018	Fruit
"Finger"	2018	TBA
"Fuck You"	2019	TBA

== Advertisements ==
Music from Abbe May's "Design Desire" single was used in a Jägermeister television commercial in 2012.

== Television ==
Music from Abbe May's "Mammalian Locomotion" single was used in the U.S. television series Entourage ending credits – Season 8 Episode 6, air date 28 August 2011. Music from Abbe May's "Cast That Devil Out" single was used in the Australian television series Packed to the Rafters – Season 5 Episode 9, air date 12 June 2012.

== Awards and nominations ==
=== AIR Awards ===
The Australian Independent Record Awards (commonly known informally as AIR Awards) is an annual awards night to recognise, promote and celebrate the success of Australia's Independent Music sector.

Year	Nominee / work	Award	Result
2008	Abbe May	Best New Independent Artist	Nominated
2011	Abbe May	Best Independent Artist	Nominated
2011	Design Desire	Best Independent Album	Nominated

=== APRA Awards ===
The APRA Awards are presented annually from 1982 by the Australasian Performing Right Association (APRA), "honouring composers and songwriters". They commenced in 1982.

Year	Nominee / work	Award	Result	Ref.
2012	"Design Desire"	Song of the Year	Shortlisted	

=== ARIA Music Awards ===
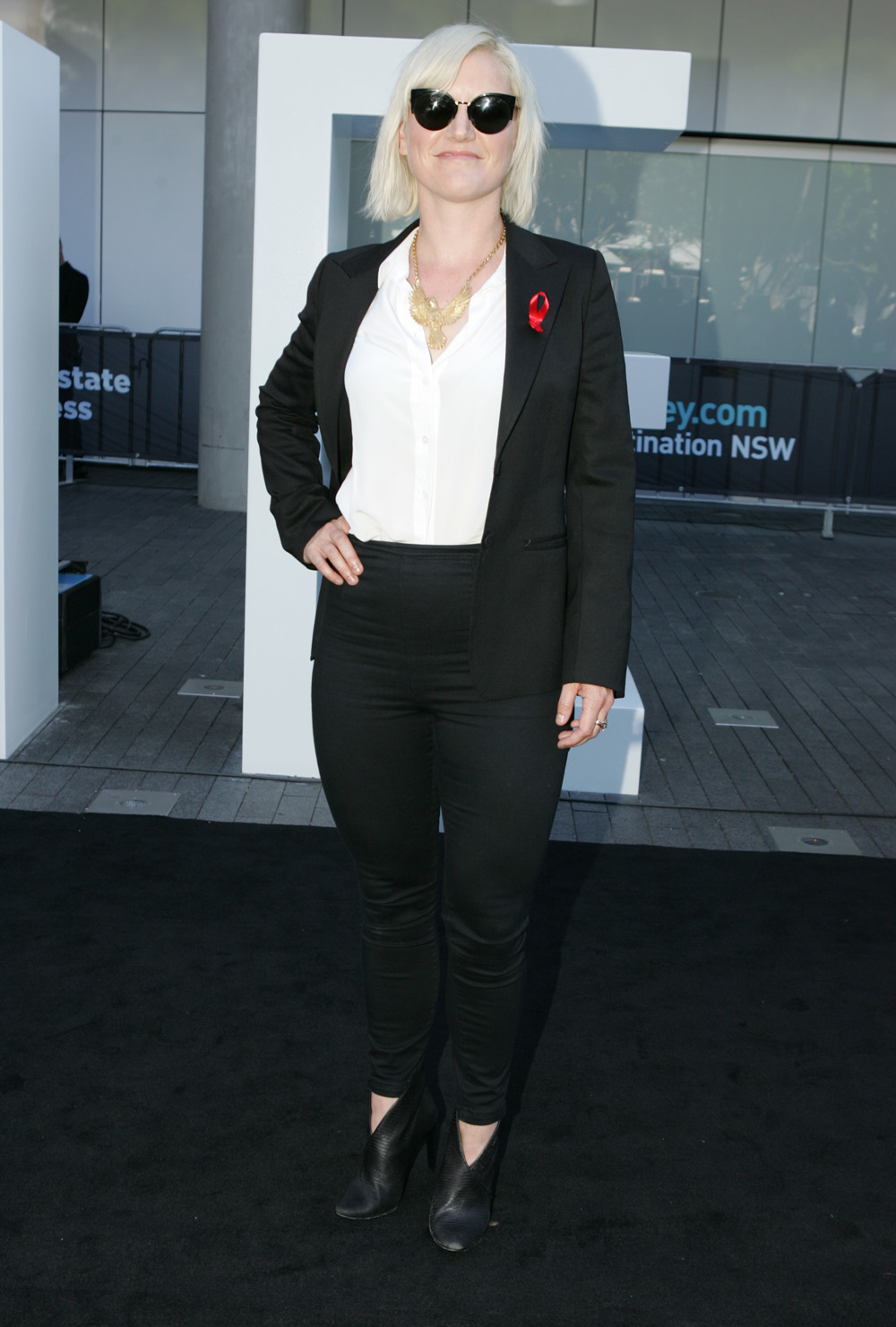
May at the ARIA Awards ceremony, December 2013, Star Event Centre, Sydney

Year	Nominee / work	Award	Result
2013	Kiss My Apocalypse	Best Female Artist	Nominated

=== Australian Music Prize ===
Year	Nominee / work	Award	Result
2011	Abbe May – "Design Desire"	Australian Music Prize	Nominated
2018	Abbe May – "Fruit"	Australian Music Prize	Nominated

=== J Awards ===
The J Awards are an annual series of Australian music awards that were established by the Australian Broadcasting Corporation's youth-focused radio station Triple J. They commenced in 2005.

Year	Nominee / work	Award	Result
2013	Kiss My Apocalypse	Australian Album of the Year	Nominated

=== National Live Music Awards ===
The National Live Music Awards (NLMAs) are a broad recognition of Australia's diverse live industry, celebrating the success of the Australian live scene. The awards commenced in 2016.

Year	Nominee / work	Award	Result
2016	Abbe May	Live Voice of the Year	Nominated

=== WAM Song of the Year ===
The WAM Song of the Year was formed by the Western Australian Rock Music Industry Association Inc. (WARMIA) in 1985, with its main aim to develop and run annual awards recognising achievements within the music industry in Western Australia.

Year	Nominee / work	Award	Result (wins only)
2006	"Sidewindin'"	Blues/Roots Song of the Year	Won
2008	"Howl and Moan"	Blues/Roots Song of the Year	Won
2008	"Howl and Moan"	Rock Song of the Year	Won
2013	"Nourishment" by Mathas (featuring Abbe May)	Electronic/Dance Song of the Year	Won
2013	"Nourishment" by Mathas (featuring Abbe May)	Urban / Hip Hop of the Year	Won
2013	"Nourishment" by Mathas (featuring Abbe May)	Grand Prize	Won

=== West Australian Music Awards ===
The West Australian Music Industry Awards (WAMIs) are annual awards presented to the local contemporary music industry, put on annually by the Western Australian Music Industry Association Inc (WAM).

Year	Nominee / work	Award	Result
2008	Abbe May and The Rockin' Pneumonia	Favourite Newcomer	Nominated
2008	Abbe May and The Rockin' Pneumonia	Most Promising New Act	Won
2008	Abbe May and The Rockin' Pneumonia	Best Blues/Roots Act	Nominated
2008	Abbe May (Abbe May and The Rockin' Pneumonia)	Best Female Vocalist	Won
2009	Abbe May and The Rockin' Pneumonia – Howl and Moan	Most Popular Album	Nominated
2009	Abbe May	Best Female Vocalist	Won
2009	Abbe May and The Rockin' Pneumonia	Best Blues / Roots Act	Won
2010	Abbe May	Best Female Vocalist	Won
2010	Abbe May	Best Female Vocalist	Won
2011	Abbe May	Most Popular Music Video	Nominated
2011	Abbe May	Best Female Vocalist	Won
2011	Abbe May	Best Blues & Roots Act	Won
2012	Abbe May	Most Popular Live Act	Won
2012	Abbe May	Most Popular Solo Artist	Won
2012	Abbe May	Most Popular Single / EP	Nominated
2012	Abbe May	Most Popular Album / EP	Nominated
2012	Abbe May	Rock Act of the Year	Won
2012	Abbe May	Blues Act of the Year	Won
2012	Abbe May	Guitarist of the Year	Won
2012	Abbe May	Female Vocalist of the Year	Won
2013	Abbe May	Female Vocalist of the Year	Won
2013	Abbe May	Solo Artist of the Year	Won
2013	Mathas – "Nourishment" (ft. Abbe May)	Single of the Year	Won
2014	Abbe May	Female Vocalist of the Year	Won
2016	Abbe May	Female Vocalist of the Year	Won
2016	Abbe May – "Doomsday Clock"	Best Single	Won
2018	Abbe May – "Fruit"	Best Album	Won
