= Cloning (band) =

Australian music group

- Origin: Perth, Western Australia, Australia
- Genres: Indie; Pop rock
- Years active: 2018–present
- Members: Felix Parker; Jack Brett; Bevan Green; Nic Rollo

Cloning are an Australian music group consisting of Felix Parker (vocals/guitar), Jack Brett (drums), Bevan Green (guitar) and Nic Rollo (synth/bass guitar). They released their debut single "Special" in 2019. Their second single "Epilogues" was nominated for WAM Song of the Year.

In October 2025, they released their debut album, Vitriol which became their first release to enter the ARIA top 50.

== Career ==
=== 2018-2023: Career beginnings and early EPs ===
Cloning formed in 2019 and released their debut EP Pillars of Salt in September 2019.

Their second EP Wounded was released in 2021. It was preceded by singles "Wounded", "How Could You Ever Think I Hated You?" and "Closure".

The third EP Fall Out was released in November 2024

=== 2025: Vitriol ===
On 31 October 2025, their debut studio album Vitriol was released.

== Discography ==
=== Studio albums ===
List of studio albums, with selected details and peak chart positions
| Title | Details | Peak chart positions |
| Title | Details | AUS |
|---|---|---|
| Vitriol | Released: 31 October 2025; Format Digital, CD; Label: GYR | 2 |

=== Compilations ===
List of EPs, with selected details and peak chart positions
| Title | Details | Peak chart positions |
| Title | Details | AUS |
|---|---|---|
| Complete Works 2019-2021 | Released: 2021; Format: digital, CD; Label: Cloning | — |

=== Extended plays ===
List of EPs, with selected details and peak chart positions
| Title | Details | Peak chart positions |
| Title | Details | AUS |
|---|---|---|
| Pillars of Salt | Released: 4 September 2019; Format: digital, CD; Label: Cloning | — |
| Wounded Healers | Released: October 2021; Format: digital, CD; Label: Cloning | — |
| Fall Out | Released: November 2024; Format: digital, CD; Label: Cloning | — |
