= National Live Music Awards of 2017 =

Annual Australian music awards ceremony

- Date: 7 December 2017
- Venue: The Grace Darling Hotel, Collingwood, Victoria, Australia

Highlights
- Most wins: Gang of Youths (4)
- Most nominations: Amy Shark, Julia Jacklin, Gang of Youths (5)

The National Live Music Awards of 2017 were the second National Live Music Awards in Australia. The event took place on 7 December 2017, and the gala event moved from Sydney to Melbourne.

All categories, bar the two People's Choice Awards, are voted on by a panel of judges around the country, representing every State and Territory in Australia. The nominees of the two People's Choice Awards were chosen by the judges, however the public vote for the winner.

There are two new awards this year: Best Pop Act and Best Country or Folk Act. The All Ages Achievement Award, which recognises an individual or organisation who supports and fosters all ages events, has expanded from NSW to Victoria.

The Heatseeker Award is now The Best New Act. The Hard Rock or Metal genre category has been shortened to just Hard Rock, the previous Roots award is now the Blues & Roots award, with Country and Folk nominees given their own category for the first time.

== National awards ==
Nominations and wins below.

Live Act of the Year

Artist	Result
Amy Shark	Nominated
Client Liaison	Nominated
Gang Of Youths	Won
The Jezabels	Nominated
Montaigne	Nominated

Live Voice of the Year

Artist	Result
David Le'aupepe (Gang of Youths)	Won
Julia Jacklin	Nominated
Meg Mac	Nominated
Stella Donnelly	Nominated
Vera Blue	Nominated

Best New Act

Artist	Result
Amastro	Nominated
Amy Shark	Won
Confidence Man	Nominated
Stella Donnelly	Nominated
Vera Blue	Nominated

Live Bassist of the Year

Artist	Result
Dan Stanley Freeman (Fanny Lumsden & The Thrillseekers)	Nominated
Gus Gardiner	Nominated
Kelly-Dawn Hellmrich (Camp Cope)	Won
Tom Tilley (Client Liaison)	Nominated
Zoe Hauptmann	Nominated

Live Drummer of the Year

Artist	Result
Sarah Thompson (Camp Cope)	Won
Shauna Boyle (Cable Ties)	Nominated
Scarlett Stevens (San Cisco)	Nominated
Tim Commandeur (Pnau, Tkay Maidza, Panama, KLP & More)	Nominated
Tom Myers (Kim Churchill, Jack River, Thelma Plum & More)	Nominated

Live Guitarist of the Year

Artist	Result
Adalita	Nominated
Joji Malani (Gang of Youths)	Nominated
Lee Hartney (The Smith Street Band)	Nominated
Oscar Dawson (Holy Holy)	Nominated
Tash Sultana	Won

Live Instrumentalist of the Year

Artist	Result
Happy Axe (Emma Kelly)	Nominated
Kirsty Tickle (Exhibitionist, Party Dozen)	Nominated
M-Phazes	Nominated
William Barton	Nominated
Yeo	Won

Live Blues and Roots Act of the Year

Artist	Result
Cash Savage and the Last Drinks	Nominated
C.W. Stoneking	Nominated
Dan Sultan	Won
Gretta Ray	Nominated
Tash Sultana	Nominated

Live Country or Folk Act of the Year

Artist	Result
All Our Exes Live in Texas	Won
Fanny Lumsden	Nominated
Henry Wagons	Nominated
Julia Jacklin	Nominated
Ruby Boots	Nominated

Live Electronic Act (or DJ) of the Year

Artist	Result
Amastro	Nominated
Happy Axe (Emma Kelly)	Nominated
Japanese Wallpaper	Nominated
Peking Duk	Won
Rainbow Chan	Nominated

Live Hard Rock Act of the Year

Artist	Result
Cable Ties	Won
Cursed Earth	Nominated
Glitoris	Nominated
High Tension	Nominated
Totally Unicorn	Nominated

Live Hip Hop Act of the Year

Artist	Result
A.B. Original	Won
Citizen Kay	Nominated
Genesis Owusu	Nominated
L-FRESH the Lion	Nominated
Sampa The Great	Nominated

Live Pop Act of the Year

Artist	Result
Amy Shark	Nominated
Client Liaison	Won
Confidence Man	Nominated
Montaigne	Nominated
Rachel Maria Cox	Nominated

Live R&B or Soul Act of the Year

Artist	Result
Caiti Baker	Nominated
Hiatus Kaiyote	Nominated
Mojo Juju	Nominated
Ngaiire	Won
Odette Mercy & Her Soul Atomics	Nominated

Best Live Music Festival or Event

Festival or Event	Result
Bigsound	Won
Dark Mofo, Tasmania	Nominated
Golden Plains	Nominated
St Jerome's Laneway Festival	Nominated
Splendour in the Grass	Nominated

International Live Achievement (Group)

Group	Result
All Our Exes Live in Texas	Nominated
Camp Cope	Nominated
King Gizzard and the Lizard Wizard	Won
Methyl Ethel	Nominated
Middle Kids	Nominated

International Live Achievement (Solo)

Group	Result
Alex Lahey	Nominated
Flume	Nominated
Julia Jacklin	Nominated
Kucka	Nominated
Tash Sultana	Won

Industry Achievement

Group	Result
Hugh Nichols, City of Sydney	Nominated
Live Music Office	Nominated
Matt and Dan Rule	Nominated
Sad Grrls Club	Nominated
Your Choice	Nominated

- Winner unknown

== People's Choice awards ==
Best Live Act of the Year

Artist	Result
A.B. Original	Nominated
All Our Exes Live in Texas	Nominated
Cable Ties	Nominated
Camp Cope	Nominated
Client Liaison	Nominated
Confidence Man	Nominated
Gang of Youths	Won
Hands Like Houses	Nominated
King Gizzard & The Lizard Wizard	Nominated
Methyl Ethel	Nominated

Best Live Voice of the Year

Artist	Result
Alex Lahey	Nominated
Amy Shark	Nominated
Courtney Barnett	Nominated
Julia Jacklin	Nominated
Kucka	Nominated
Ngaiire	Nominated
Sampa The Great	Nominated
Stella Donnelly	Won
Tash Sultana	Nominated
Vera Blue	Nominated

== State and Territory awards ==
- Note: Wins only.

ACT Awards - Presented by BMA Magazine
Award	Winner
Live Act of the Year	The Ansah Brothers
Live Voice of the Year	Ella Hunt (Lowlands)
Live Venue of the Year	Smith's Alternative
Live Event of the Year	Spilt Milk

Northern Territory Awards - Presented by Foldback Mag
Award	Winner
Live Act of the Year	The Lonely Boys
Live Voice of the Year	Caiti Baker
Live Venue of the Year	Darwin Railway Club
Live Event of the Year	Bush Bands Bash

NSW Awards - Presented by 2SER
Award	Winner
Live Act of the Year	Gang of Youths
Live Voice of the Year	Julia Jacklin
Live Venue of the Year	St Jerome's Laneway Festival
Live Event of the Year	Oxford Art Factory
All Ages Achievement	The Plot

Queensland Awards - Presented by 4ZZZ
Award	Winner
Live Act of the Year	Violent Soho
Live Voice of the Year	Amy Shark
Live Venue of the Year	The Triffid
Live Event of the Year	BIGSOUND

South Australian Awards - Presented by Radio Adelaide
Award	Winner
Live Act of the Year	Electric Fields
Live Voice of the Year	Zaachariaha Fielding (Electric Fields)
Live Venue of the Year	Grace Emily Hotel
Live Event of the Year	A Day of Clarity

Tasmanian Awards - Presented by Edge Radio
Award	Winner
Live Act of the Year	EWAH & The Vision of Paradise
Live Voice of the Year	Seth Henderson
Live Venue of the Year	The Brisbane Hotel
Live Event of the Year	Dark Mofo

Victorian Awards - Presented by SYN Media
Award	Winner
Live Act of the Year	Camp Cope
Live Voice of the Year	Romy Vager (RVG)
Live Venue of the Year	The Old Bar
Live Event of the Year	Golden Plains
All Ages Achievement	Girls Rock! Melbourne

West Australian Awards - Presented by RTR FM
Award	Winner
Live Act of the Year	POW! Negro
Live Voice of the Year	Stella Donnelly
Live Venue of the Year	The Bird
Live Event of the Year	WAMfest
