= Sugar Army =

Australian musical group

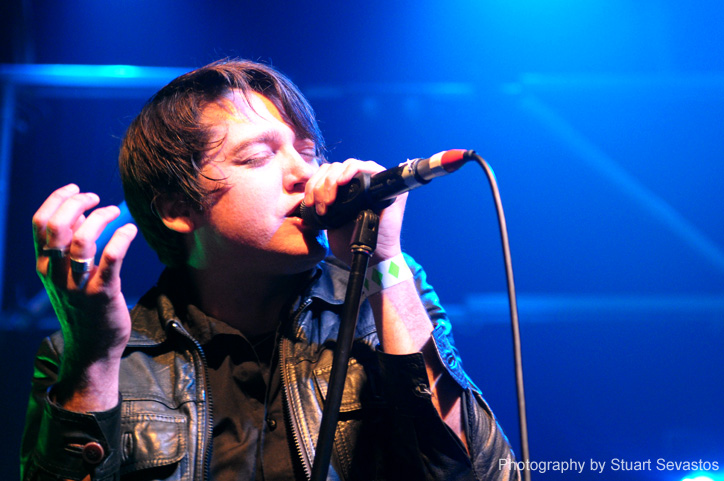

Background information
- Origin: Perth, Western Australia, Australia
- Genre: Rock
- Years active: 2005–present
- Labels: Good Cop Bad Cop; Shock
- Members: Patrick McLaughlin; Todd Honey; Jamie Sher
- Past members: Ian Berney
- Website: http://www.sugararmy.com.au

Sugar Army are an Australian rock band from Perth, Western Australia.

== History ==
=== 2005–2008: Formation and Where Do You Hide Your Toys ===
Sugar Army are fronted by Patrick McLaughlin and consisting of Todd Honey on lead guitar, Jamie Sher on drums and Ian Berney on bass guitar formed in 2005.

In 2007, the band received two nominations, "Favourite Newcomer" and "Most Promising New Act", at the 2007 West Australian Music Industry Awards. Sugar Army released its debut EP, Where Do You Hide Your Toys, through Perth label Good Cop Bad Cop (with distribution through Inertia) in February 2008, supporting Interpol in Australia that month. Where Do You Hide Your Toys was produced by Dave Parkin (Snowman, Red Jezebel) and mastered by William Bowden at King Willy Sound, the EP featured the songs, "...And Now You're Old Enough, I Think That You Should Know" and "Jigsaw", which both received radio support nationwide and earned them four nominations, "Most Popular Act", "Best Rock Act", "Best Bassist" and "Most Popular Single/EP", at the West Australian Music Industry Awards that year.

=== 2009–2010: The Parallels Amongst Ourselves ===
In March 2009, "Acute" was released as the lead single from their forthcoming debut studio album. The track was featured on radio and TV nationwide and reached the top 5 in the AIR (Australian Independent Records) Independent Radio Airplay chart. They were nominated for five West Australian Music Industry Awards in 2009, "Most Popular Act", "Most Popular Music Video" "Best Rock Act", "Best Male Vocalist" and "Best Bassist", winning Best Rock Song.

Second single "Tongues in Cheeks" was released to radio in June 2009. A video for this song was co-directed by the band's drummer Jamie Sher together with Dominic Pearce, was released on 6 August 2009.

Debut album The Parallels Amongst Ourselves was released 10 July 2009 through Shock Records and debuted at #87 in the ARIA charts and #2 in the Australian Independent Record 100% Indie Charts. It also was selected as 'Album of the Week' on RTRFM and SynFM. The album was recorded by Dave Parkin and mastered by William Bowden, with the "Acute" single mastered by Greg Calbi (David Bowie, Bob Dylan, Interpol) at Sterling Sound. In August through to September 2009, the band toured Australia in support of the record.

The band's third single, "No Need for Lovers", was released in October 2009. The song is about the murder of Stacey Mitchell in Lathlain, Western Australia by two lesbian lovers 'in a fit of jealousy and sadistic pleasure'. It was the #1 played song on Triple J for the month of September 2009.

The band also appeared at the Big Day Out in 2010.

=== 2011–2015: Summertime Heavy ===
Sugar Army began work on their second album following their 2009/2010 Summer festival appearances. The album recording was hindered by the departure of bass player Ian Berney in April 2011. The band, now a three-piece expanding their live show to five with the addition of two session members, completed the recording of their second album with Eric J and Scott Horscroft at BJB Studios in Sydney in July 2011, mastered by Nilesh Patel at The Exchange (UK).

First single "Hooks For Hands" was released in February 2012. Sugar Army's second album, Summertime Heavy was released on 7 September 2011.

=== 2016–present: Beast ===
Sugar Army's third album, Beast was released in August 2016.

== Members ==
- Patrick McLaughlin – vocals, guitar
- Todd Honey – guitar
- Jamie Sher – drums, bass
- Ian Berney – bass (2005–2011)

== Discography ==
=== Albums ===
List of albums, with selected details and chart positions
Title	Details	Peak chart positions
Title	Details	AUS
The Parallels Amongst Ourselves	Released: July 2009; Label: Sugar Army / Shock (SUG002); Format: CD, digital download	87
Summertime Heavy	Released: September 2012; Label: Permanent (PR003); Format: CD, digital download	—
Beast	Released: August 2016; Label: Sugar Army (SUG004); Format: CD, digital download	—

=== Extended plays ===
List of EPs, with selected details
Title	Details
Where Do You Hide Your Toys	Released: February 2008; Label: Good Cop Bad Cop (GCBC001); Format: CD, digital download

== Awards ==
=== WAM Song of the Year ===
The WAM Song of the Year was formed by the Western Australian Rock Music Industry Association Inc. (WARMIA) in 1985, with its main aim to develop and run annual awards recognising achievements within the music industry in Western Australia.

Year	Nominee / work	Award	Result (wins only)
2009	"Acute"	Rock Song of the Year	Won
