= Sleepy Little Deathtoll Town =

EP by The Panda Band
- Released: 2005-02-07
- Genre: Indie pop
- Length: 15:34
- Label: BamBoo Records/QStik Records

The Panda Band chronology
Sleepy Little Deathtoll Town (2005)	This Vital Chapter (2006)

Sleepy Little Deathtoll Town is the first EP from The Panda Band, released in 2005. The name of the title track is a reference to their home town. "Sleepy Little Deathtoll Town" reached #73 on Triple J's Hottest 100 for 2004 and also won the WAM Song of the Year in 2006, winning 'Pop' category. "Then You Appear" winning the 'Mixed Bag' category in the same year. "Eyelashes" and "Sleepy Little Deathtoll Town" both received significant airplay on national youth broadcaster, Triple J and community radio across Australia.

Sleepy Little Deathtoll Town also found its way onto airwaves in the United Kingdom through John Kennedy at XFM and Jane Gazzo at BBC6. XFM also had the band stop by the studio while they were in London in October 2005 to play a few songs from the EP for broadcast on Kennedy’s nightly radio program, Xposure.

== Track listing ==
1. "Luray Caverns" – 0:39
2. "Eyelashes" – 3:49
3. "Then you Appear" – 4:35
4. "Quiet as Meeses" – 0:57
5. "Sleepy Little Deathtoll Town" – 3:07
6. "Fools 'n' Sharks" – 3:27
