= The Panda Band =

Australian musical group

- Origin: Perth, Western Australia
- Genres: Indie pop
- Years active: 2003–present
- Labels: Bam*Boo/QStik Records/MGM; Filter Records
- Members: Damian Crosbie; David Namour; Stephen Callan; Chris Callan; Gabriel Nicotra

The Panda Band are an indie pop band originating from Perth, Western Australia. They have a reputation for combining numerous musical genres. They have toured nationally as support acts for bands such as The Sleepy Jackson, Little Birdy, The Grates and Evermore.

== Biography ==
The band originally existed in the late nineties as Philius Phog until Crosbie went travelling Europe. They reformed and played their first gig as Generic Boy Band (with Crosbie, Namour, Nicotra and Chris Callan in the band) in an opening heat of the Australian National Campus Band Competition in the latter half of 2003, where they failed to make it past the first round.

At the WAMi Weekender in June 2004, they played their first gig as The Panda Band, with late addition Steve Callan on keys in Perth.

Their first single "Eyelashes", was playlisted on national (Triple J) & interstate radio (FBi Radio, RTRFM) and given single of the week in two Australian street press magazines in April 2004. The band undertook its first tour of regional and metropolitan Western Australia with Little Birdy in July 2004, followed by their first interstate dates in Sydney & Victoria playing with Hope of the States in August 2004. Their second single "Sleepy Little Deathtoll Town" (taken from the EP of the same name) was released in September 2004, and was playlisted on national & interstate radio, this was followed in October by an eleven date Australian tour with Little Birdy. The band were selected for Triple J's Fresh Crop artist for Australian Music Month (November 2004) profiling the song "Mohawk". The Panda Band were listed by Rolling Stone Magazine as number 1 band to watch in 2005

"A surreal, swirling and eclectic mix of instrumentation and melodies. Flaming Lips and Modest Mouse eccentricity blended with the classic harmonies and quirk of Sgt Peppers-era Beatles."
(Bronwyn Thompson – Rolling Stone Magazine January 2005).

"Sleepy Little Deathtoll Town" entered the Triple J Hottest 100 of 2004, at number 73 and the band were awarded 'Most Promising New Act at the 2005 Western Australian Music Industry Awards (WAMi's) in February 2005. The Panda Band performed at the inaugural Southbound Festival (January 2005) and played at The Big Day Out in Perth (February 2005). February 2005 also saw the release of their debut EP, Sleepy Little Deathtoll Town. Australian music journalist Ed Nimmervoll declared it Feature Album of the Week in April and described it as "An avalanche of ideas, neatly packaged into songs. Memorable melodic hooks. Dark, psychedelic lyrics... It's some of the most intelligent, original, unpredictable, bizarrely fascinating music..."

The band's next single, "Then you Appear" was released in March 2005 and again playlisted on national & interstate radio. March also saw the band performing at The Knitting Factory in Los Angeles, SXSW Festival, Rothkos and The Mercury Lounge in New York City and The Marquee Club in London. The band then returned to Australia and toured with Evermore in April, June and July. September and October saw the band perform shows at Manchester's in the city, Liverpool, Leeds, Wrexham (touring with Proud Mary) and three gigs in London (one with The Spinto Band), they also record a live recording at XFM Radio in London for broadcast on John Kennedy's nightly new music program. The Panda Band were then invited to perform at Canadian Music Week 2006 and The Great Escape Festival 2006 in Brighton, UK. The next single, "Alana" (October 2005) was playlisted on national and interstate radio. The band received three song awards including mixed category, pop category and Song of the Year at the WA Music Industry Association's Songwriting Awards in October 2005. The band then undertook a headline tour to Sydney and Melbourne including the Bathurst Village Fair and were again invited to perform at SXSW in 2006.

In February 2006 The Panda Band were awarded 'Best Indie Rock Act' and 'Best Drummer' at the 2006 Western Australian Music Industry Awards. The band commenced recording their debut album at Blackbird Studios in March 2006 Damian Crosbie was awarded the Australasian Performing Rights Society Professional Development Award for the Contemporary Music category for his song "Eyelashes", which was followed by a national tour of Australia as the main support act for The Grates. They signed to Filter US Recordings in March 2006 to release their album in North America.

Their first full-length album This Vital Chapter was independently released in Australia on 5 August 2006 and in the United States by Filter US Recordings and Fontana Distribution on 18 September 2006, with a special iTunes pre-release on 25 July. A national tour followed which saw band take New rules for boats around Australia with them. They were also joined at various points by Jump 2 Light Speed and Jeff Strong. Immediately following the album tour, they went on The Sleepy Jackson's Personality - One Was A Spider, One Was A Bird Australian tour. They followed this up in November with an east coast of Australia tour with The Exploders from Melbourne and Perth band The Dirty Secrets. The tour was called "Way of the Exploding Panda".

The Panda Band performed at the "Escape to the Park" concert on 25 November at King's Park, Perth, Western Australia, alongside Josh Pyke, Tex Perkins, Sarah Blasko & Augie March. They also performed at the Southbound at Busselton in January 2007.

In 2007 they performed a third time at the SXSW Music Festival in Austin, Texas. Following the festival they then undertook an eleven date USA tour covering Los Angeles, San Francisco, Austin, Chicago, & New York to promote the album release in North America. The Panda Band then toured nationally, supporting Gomez at some shows.

The band's latest single, "The Fix", was released as a free download in April 2011, ahead of the release of their second studio album, Charisma Weapon. The album was scheduled to be released on 15 July on the band's own label, Bam*Boo.

== Band members ==
- David Namour – bass
- Stephen Callan – keyboards/samples/Lead Song Writer
- Chris Callan – guitar/backing vocals
- Scott Lee Howard – drums/percussion
- Damian Crosbie – lead vocals/guitar

== Discography ==
=== Studio albums ===
Title	Details
This Vital Chapter	Released: 5 August 2006; Label: Bam*Boo (BAM002); Format: CD, digital download
Charisma Weapon	Released: 15 July 2011; Label: Bam*Boo (BAM003); Format: CD, digital download

=== Extended plays ===
Title	Details
Sleepy Little Deathtoll Town	Released:7 February 2005; Label: Bam*Boo (BAM001); Format: CD, digital download

== Awards ==
=== WAM Song of the Year ===
The WAM Song of the Year was formed by the Western Australian Rock Music Industry Association Inc. (WARMIA) in 1985, with its main aim to develop and run annual awards recognising achievements within the music industry in Western Australia.

Year	Nominee / work	Award	Result (wins only)
2005	"Then You Appear" (written by Damian Crosbie)	Mixed Bag Song of the Year	Won
2005	"Sleepy Little Death Toll Town" (written by Damian Crosbie)	Pop Song of the Year	Won
2011	"51 Swimsuits" (written by Damian Crosbie)	Pop Song of the Year	Won

=== West Australian Music Industry Awards ===
The West Australian Music Industry Awards (WAMIs) are annual awards presented to the local contemporary music industry, put on annually by the Western Australian Music Industry Association Inc (WAM). The Panda Band won three awards.

Year	Nominee / work	Award	Result (wins only)
2005	The Panda Band	Most Promising New Act	Won
2006	The Panda Band	Best Indie/Pop Act	Won
2006	Gabriel Nicotra (The Panda Band)	Best Drummer	Won
