= Carla Geneve =

Australian musician

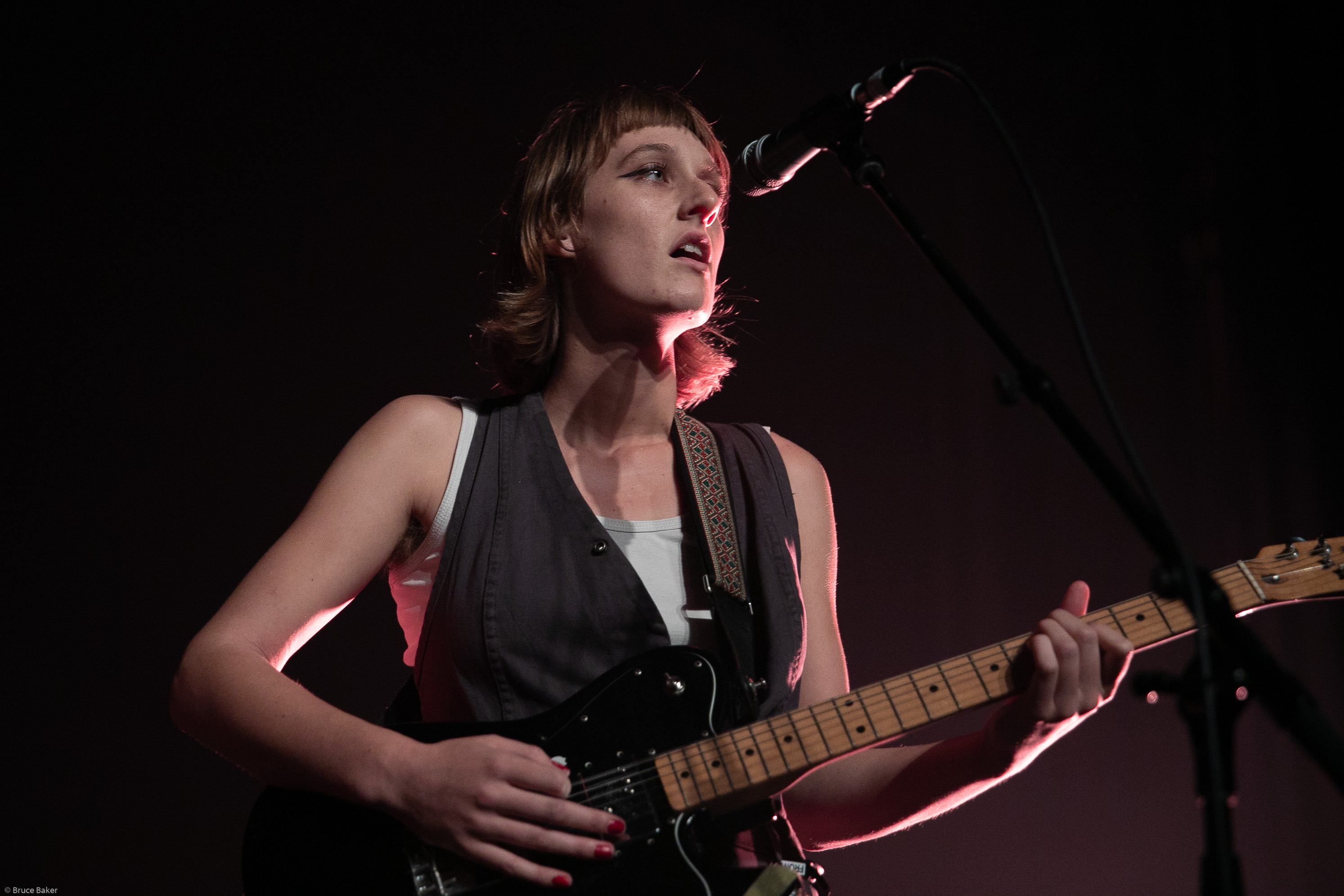
- Geneve in 2020

Background information
- Born: Albany, Western Australia
- Origin: Perth, Western Australia
- Genres: Indie pop
- Occupations: Singer; songwriter
- Instruments: Vocals; Guitarist
- Years active: 2017–present
- Labels: Remote Control; Dot Dash

Carla Geneve is an Australian singer-songwriter from Albany, Western Australia.

== Career ==
=== 2017–2019: Debut extended play ===
Carla Geneve released her debut single "Greg's Discount Chemist" in March 2018 and was released to overwhelming support from triple j and community radio.

Geneve released her second single "Listening" which garnering praise for her showcases at BIGSOUND in Brisbane, and at the end of 2018 saw her earn seven nominations at the West Australian Music Industry Awards where she won Best Single for "Greg's Discount Chemist" and Best Rock Act.

In May 2019, Geneve announced the release her self-titled debut EP, released on 7 June 2019. Geneve supported San Cisco on their North America tour in June 2019.

=== 2020–2022: Learn to Like It ===
In 2020, Geneve released the singles "Don't Wanna Be Your Lover" and "The Right Reasons". "The Right Reasons" won the Unpublished Prize at the 2020 Vanda & Young Global Songwriting Competition.

In January 2021, Geneve announced the release of her debut studio album, Learn to Like It alongside its third single, "Dog Eared". The album was initially scheduled for release in April 2021, but was delayed a year. Geneve has cited the need to focus on her mental health, in particular her bipolar disorder, as a reason for the delay.

=== 2023: Hertz ===
On 4 August 2023, Geneve released "Bills", the lead single from her second studio album, Hertz.

== Discography ==
=== Studio albums ===
List of albums, with release date and label shown
| Title | Details | Peak chart positions |
| Title | Details | AUS |
|---|---|---|
| Learn to Like It | Released: 8 April 2022; Label: Remote Control, Dot Dash (DASH071LP); Formats: digital download, LP, streaming | — |
| Hertz | Released: 27 October 2023; Label: Remote Control, Dot Dash; Formats: digital download, streaming | — |
| Don't Be Afraid | Released: 17 October 2025; Label: Remote Control, Dot Dash; Formats: digital download, streaming | 63 |

=== Extended plays ===
List of EPs, with release date and label shown
| Title | Details |
|---|---|
| Carla Geneve | Released: 7 June 2019; Label: Remote Control, Dot Dash (DASH058LP); Formats: digital download, LP, streaming |

== Awards and nominations ==
=== AIR Awards ===
The Australian Independent Record Awards (commonly known informally as AIR Awards) is an annual awards night to recognise, promote and celebrate the success of Australia's Independent Music sector.

| Year | Nominee / work | Award | Result |
|---|---|---|---|
| 2020 | Carla Geneve | Breakthrough Independent Artist of the Year | Nominated |

=== National Live Music Awards ===
The National Live Music Awards (NLMAs) are a broad recognition of Australia's diverse live industry, celebrating the success of the Australian live scene. The awards commenced in 2016.

| Year | Nominee / work | Award | Result | Ref. |
|---|---|---|---|---|
| 2018 | Carla Geneve | Live Blues and Roots Act of the Year | Nominated | |
| 2019 | Carla Geneve | Best Live Voice of the Year | Nominated | |
| 2019 | Carla Geneve | Live Guitarist of the Year | Nominated | |
| 2019 | Carla Geneve | Western Australia Live Voice of the Year | Won | |
| 2023 | Carla Geneve | Best Live Voice in Western Australia | Won | |

=== Vanda & Young Global Songwriting Competition ===
The Vanda & Young Global Songwriting Competition is an annual competition that "acknowledges great songwriting whilst supporting and raising money for Nordoff-Robbins" and is coordinated by Albert Music and APRA AMCOS. It commenced in 2009.

| Year | Nominee / work | Award | Result |
|---|---|---|---|
| 2020 | "The Right Reasons" | Unpublished prize | Won |

=== WAM Song of the Year ===
The WAM Song of the Year was formed by the Western Australian Rock Music Industry Association Inc. (WARMIA) in 1985, with its main aim to develop and run annual awards recognising achievements within the music industry in Western Australia.

| Year | Nominee / work | Award | Result |
|---|---|---|---|
| 2019 | "Greg's Discount Chemist" | Song of the Year Grand Prize | Won |
| 2019 | "Greg's Discount Chemist" | Rock Song of the Year | Won |
| 2020 | "2001" | Song of the Year Grand Prize | Won |
| 2020 | "2001" | Rock Song of the Year | Won |
| 2020 | "Things Change" | Folk Song of the Year | Won |

=== West Australian Music Industry Awards ===
The West Australian Music Industry Awards (WAMIs) are annual awards presented to the local contemporary music industry, put on annually by the Western Australian Music Industry Association Inc (WAM). Geneve has won seven awards.

| Year | Nominee / work | Award | Result (wins only) |
|---|---|---|---|
| 2017 | Carla Geneve | Best Regional Act | Won |
| 2018 | Carla Geneve | Best Rock Act | Won |
| 2018 | "Greg's Discount Chemist" | Best Single | Won |
| 2019 | Carla Geneve | Best Rock Act | Won |
| 2019 | Carla Geneve | Best Guitarist | Won |
| 2019 | Carla Geneve | Best EP | Won |
| 2019 | "Things Change" | Best Single | Won |
