= Timothy Nelson =

Australian singer

- Born: Australia
- Occupations: Musician, songwriter
- Years active: 2006–present

Timothy Nelson is an Australian singer-songwriter from Perth, Western Australia. Nelson has performed under the name Timothy Nelson & The Infidels.

== Career ==
=== 2006–2014: I Know This Now & Terror Terror, Hide It Hide It ===
In 2007, Nelson won Upper Secondary Song of the Year Grand Prize at the WAM Song of the Year with the song "Overcast Day".

In 2010, the band released "You Don't Know What You're Waiting for" with Beat Magazine saying "Nelson sings about the fitful impatience of youth, the uncertainty that plagues teenagers as they stand around waiting for their lives to start, hating themselves a little bit, certain that something amazing is waiting for them just over the horizon. A simple, reasonably effective tune."

In June 2011 album, Timothy Nelson & The Infidels released the album I Know This Now, which Nelson said I used to write a lot of love songs, which ended up being the main body of the album...I definitely went through a period of writing those kinds of tunes. You kind of write about what you feel comfortable writing about. I think that's probably half the reason why I started writing songs in the first place: you either write about that stuff or don't end up talking about it at all. And that doesn't sound healthy,”

In July 2014, the band released Terror Terror, Hide It Hide It. Cam Findlay from The Music’ gave the album 4 out of 5.

In 2014, the band won five WA Music awards out of seven nomination.

=== 2015–present: Solo work and Words Like Young ===
In 2015, Nelson co-wrote and produced songs for the kids' television series The Shapes, an animated series of short music videos appearing on ABC TV. The series took home the Western Australian Screen Academy (WASA) award for Outstanding Achievement in Animation.

In November 2016, Nelson released his debut solo album, Words Like Young. The Music said it's "A brilliant solo debut" and Rolling Stone called it "A wonderfully personal, yet inviting release".

In March 2020, Nelson released "Your House", which Nelson said "It's basically about having no money, but knowing a friend that does, and inviting yourself over to their house so you can enjoy the day like a boss". This was followed by "Biding Time" and July, "Summer They Say" in September 2020 and "Working Weekend" in October 2020 all set to appear on a new album set for release in 2021.

== Discography ==
=== Studio albums ===
Title	Details
I Know This Now (As Timothy Nelson & the Infidels)	Released: June 2011; Label: Timothy Nelson & the Infidels, Green Media Distribution (INFID01); Format: CD, digital download
Terror Terror, Hide It Hide It (As Timothy Nelson & the Infidels)	Released: July 2014; Label: Timothy Nelson & the Infidels; Format: digital download
Words Like Young	Released: November 2016; Label: Timothy Nelson (TN001); Format: CD, LP, digital download, streaming
Debaser Tapes	Released: 19 February 2025; Label: Timothy Nelson; Format: digital download, streaming

== Awards and nominations ==
=== WAM Song of the Year ===
The WAM Song of the Year was formed by the Western Australian Rock Music Industry Association Inc. (WARMIA) in 1985, with its main aim to develop and run annual awards recognising achievements within the music industry in Western Australia.

Year	Nominee / work	Award	Result
2007	"Overcast Day"	Upper Secondary Song of the Year Grand Prize	Won
2009	"Sleeping Alone"	Country Song of the Year Grand Prize	Won
2011	"Speak the Truth in Love"	Song of the Year Grand Prize	Won
2011	"Speak the Truth in Love"	Love Song of the Year	Won
2021	"Biding Time"	Folk Song of the Year	Won

=== West Australian Music Industry Awards ===
The West Australian Music Industry Awards (WAMIs) are annual awards presented to the local contemporary music industry, put on annually by the Western Australian Music Industry Association Inc (WAM). Nelson has won six awards.

Year	Nominee / work	Award	Result (wins only)
2013	Timothy Nelson & The Infidels	Best Folk Act	Won
2014	Timothy Nelson & The Infidels	Best Pop Act	Won
2014	Terror Terror, Hide It Hide It	Best Album	Won
2014	Timothy Nelson	Best Male Vocalist	Won
2014	Timothy Nelson	Best Keys / Synth	Won
2016	Timothy Nelson	Best Keys / Synth	Won
