= This Vital Chapter =

Studio album by The Panda Band
- Released: 6 June 2006 (AUS); 18 September 2006 (US)
- Recorded: February 2006 – March 2006
- Genre: Indie pop
- Length: 37:50
- Labels: BamBoo/MGM Distribution (AUS); Filter US Recordings/Fontana Distribution (US)
- Producer: David Parkin

The Panda Band chronology
"Sleepy Little Deathtoll Town" (2005)	This Vital Chapter (2006)

This Vital Chapter is the first album from The Panda Band, released in Australia on 8 May 2006 and in the United States on 12 September 2006 - subtitled 'We're Almost Not Even Here'. The album features new recordings of radio favourites "Sleepy Little Deathtoll Town" (which reached #73 on Triple J's Hottest 100), "Eyelashes" and the most recent "Ghosts Have The Best Time". The US release, under the Filter US Recordings label, provided a different track listing to the Australian release.

The album was nominated for the Most Popular Album award at the 2007 West Australian Music Industry Awards.

Following the appearance of the band at SXSW in 2007 and subsequent tour of the United States the album received airplay in various cities across the United States.

== Track listing (AUS) ==
1. "Paragraph 1: Hibernation" – (Crosbie) 0:40
2. "High in Your Saddle" – (Crosbie) 3:19
3. "Sleepy Little Deathtoll Town" – (Crosbie) 3:07
4. "Lovely Shoulders" – (Crosbie) 2:31
5. "Musical Chairs" – (Crosbie) 4:51
6. "Spanish Bride" – (Crosbie) 3:35
7. "A Call to Your Arms" – (Crosbie) 1:42
8. "Ghosts Have the Best Time" – (Crosbie) 2:55
9. "We've Got the Face of the Earth" – (Crosbie) 1:53
10. "The Jaguar" – (Crosbie) 3:15
11. "Eyelashes" – (Crosbie, Namour) 3:42
12. "Signing Off (We're Almost Not Even Here: Part 1)" – (Crosbie, Namour) 6:12

== Track listing (US) ==
1. "Paragraph I: Hibernation" - (Crosbie) 0:38
2. "High in Your Saddle" - (Crosbie) 3:20
3. "Sleepy Little Deathtoll Town" - (Crosbie) 3:08
4. "Eyelashes" - (Crosbie, Namour) 3:42
5. "Spanish Bride" - (Crosbie) 3:33
6. "Musical Chairs" - (Crosbie) 4:56
7. "Lovely Shoulders" - (Crosbie) 2:32
8. "A Call to Your Arms" - (Crosbie) 1:42
9. "Ghosts Have the Best Time" - (Crosbie) 2:54
10. "We've Got the Face of the Earth" - (Crosbie) 1:53
11. "The Jaguar" - (Crosbie) 3:19
12. "Signing Off (We're Almost Not Even Here) Part I..." - (Crosbie, Namour) 6:08

== Personnel ==
=== The Panda Band ===
- Christopher Callan
- Stephen Callan
- Damian Robert Crosbie
- David Namour
- Gabriel Nicotra

=== Additional musicians ===
- Katy Steele - vocals (tracks 7 & 9)
- Shane Pouley - double bass (track 4)
- Shaun Lee-Chen - violin (tracks 2, 4, 6, 9 & 12)
- Alex Brogan - viola (tracks 2, 4, 6, 9 & 12)
- Tristen Parr - cello, string transcription (tracks 2, 4, 6, 9 & 12
- Claire McGowan - tuba (tracks 1, 2, 3, 5, 8 & 10)
- James Murphy - trumpet (tracks 1, 2, 3, 5, 8 & 10)
- Melanie Price - trombone (tracks 1, 2, 3, 5, 8 & 10
- Mark Sprogowski - saxophones, clarinet (tracks 1, 2, 3, 5, 8 & 10
- Jonathan Fernades - horn transcription (tracks 1, 2, 3, 5, 8 & 10)

== Reviews ==
- Treblezine - Terrance Terich (26 September 2006)
- PopMatters - Dan Rapper (18 October 2006)
- OneTimesOne (25 July 2007)
- Filter Magazine
