= Victoria Hall (Fremantle) =

Music venue and former cinema in Fremantle, Western Australia

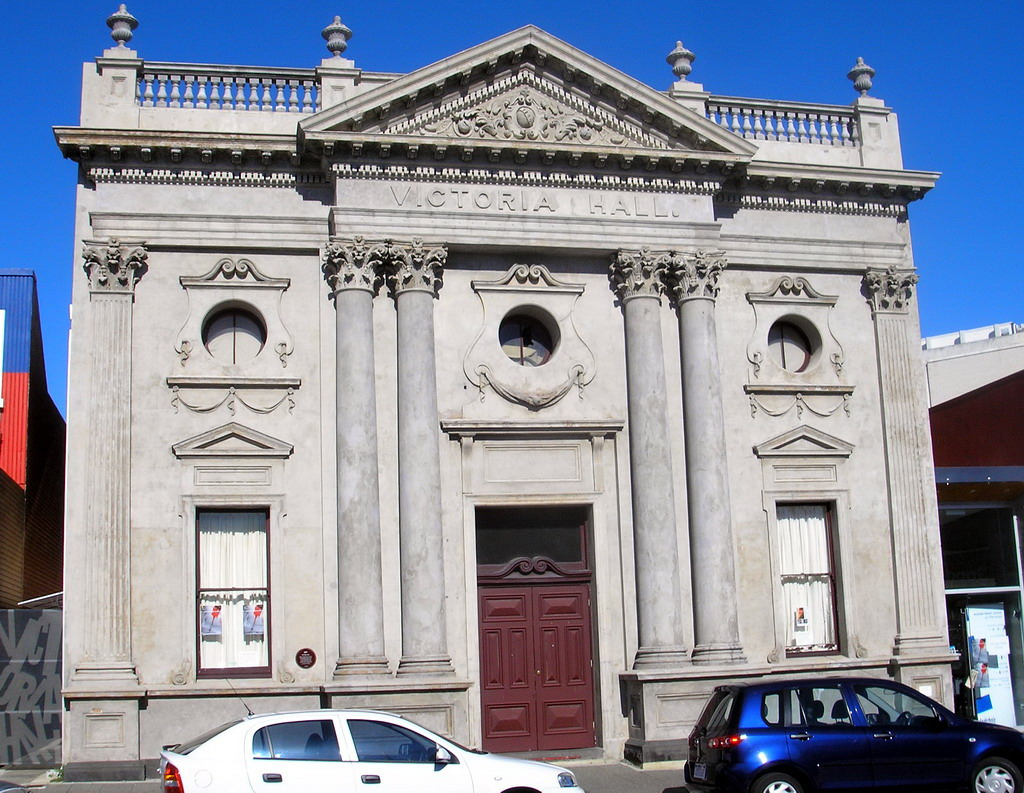
- The front of Victoria Hall

General information
- Location: 179 High Street, Fremantle, Australia
- Coordinates: 32°3′12.83″S 115°44′59.56″E
- Opened: 28 September 1897

Western Australia Heritage Register
- Type: State Registered Place
- Designated: 7 April 1998
- Reference no.: 935

Victoria Hall located on High Street, Fremantle designed by Talbot Hobbs was built between 1896 and 1897 as St John's Parish Hall, and renamed for the diamond jubilee of Queen Victoria in 1897. It was opened by Governor Smith and his wife on 28 September 1897.

After the Second World War, Bob Wrightson leased the hall for use as a dance studio; some years later he bought it.

Victoria Hall, one of few goldrush buildings remaining in the east end of High Street, sits in a predominantly 1960s streetscape. In 1974 a plan to widen High Street meant that Victoria Hall would be demolished, but a green ban put in place by the Builders Labourers Federation prevented this from happening. Wrightson still owned the building at this time.

The building is listed on the Register of the National Estate.

It housed the Deckchair Theatre for many years prior to its closure in 2012. The building sat vacant from 2012 to 2015, then was the second and final home for the Fly by Night Club from 2015 to 2018 after their eviction from the Artillery Drill Hall. It is now a multi-use arts venue housing organisations Fremantle Theatre Company, Spacemarket and the Fremantle Biennale as well as a regular events' venue with a separate events bar.
