= Superego (disambiguation) =

Superego is a psychoanalytic theory developed by Sigmund Freud.

Superego, Superegos, Super ego or Super-ego may also refer to:

== Arts and entertainment ==
- Superego (band), Australian hip hop group
- "Superego", a song by Disclosure from the album Caracal
- Superego (podcast), American improv comedy show
- Superegos, 2014 German drama film
- Superego (album), released 1997 by Finnish pop group Egotrippi
- Super-Ego (comics), fictional character from the 1990s Marvel Comics
- SuperEgo, record label established by musician Aimee Mann

== See also ==
- Superego resistance
