= ReWiggled – A Tribute to the Wiggles =

2011 album by various artists

Compilation album by Various artists
- Released: 4 November 2011
- Length: 49:39
- Label: ABC Music

ReWiggled – A Tribute to the Wiggles is a tribute album to Australian Children's band the Wiggles, released in November 2011 to celebrate the band's 20th anniversary. The album consists of contemporary Australian artists interpretations of Wiggles songs. The album peaked at number 25 on the ARIA Chart.

A follow-up, solely titled ReWiggled, was released on 11 March 2022.

== Reception ==
Catherine May from More Than You Think said "Is this a serious collection of tracks honouring the band? Possibly not... but it is an album that pays tribute to the kids' band in a fun way. There's no irony or subtle digs at the band, because ultimately they are Australian legends with twenty years of wildly successful albums, tours and TV shows behind them, and this album is definitely legendary in my book".

== Track listing ==
1. "Hot Potato" by The Living End - 1:52
2. "The Monkey Dance" by Washington - 2:22
3. "Getting Strong!" by Jebediah - 1:54
4. "Rock-a-Bye Your Bear" by Spiderbait - 1:50
5. "Dressing Up" by Busby Marou - 2:31
6. "I Love It When It Rains" by Sarah Blasko - 2:47
7. "Can You (Point Your Fingers And Do The Twist?)" by Papa vs Pretty - 2:02
8. "Toot Toot, Chugga Chugga, Big Red Car" by Oh Mercy - 3:36
9. "Wiggly Party" by Architecture In Helsinki - 2:12
10. "Captain's Magic Buttons" by Frenzal Rhomb - 1:18
11. "Get Ready To Wiggle" by Adalita - 3:23
12. "Wiggle Bay" by Dead Letter Chorus - 2:41
13. "Wags the Dog" by The Snowdroppers - 2:53
14. "Our Boat Is Rocking On the Sea" by Angie Hart - 3:01
15. "Cowboys and Cowgirls" by The Audreys - 3:04
16. "Shaky Shaky" by Sons of Rico - 1:45
17. "Henry's Spinning" by Paul Greene - 3:55
18. "Wake Up Jeff!" by Bluejuice - 1:48
19. "Fruit Salad" by Steve Lane and the Autocrats - 2:36
20. "Georgia's Song" by Clare Bowditch - 2:16

== Charts ==
=== Weekly charts ===
Chart (2011)	Peak position
Australian Albums (ARIA)	25

=== Year-end charts ===
Chart (2011)	Peak position
Australian Artist (ARIA Charts)	40
