= The Merindas =

Australian Indigenous pop duo

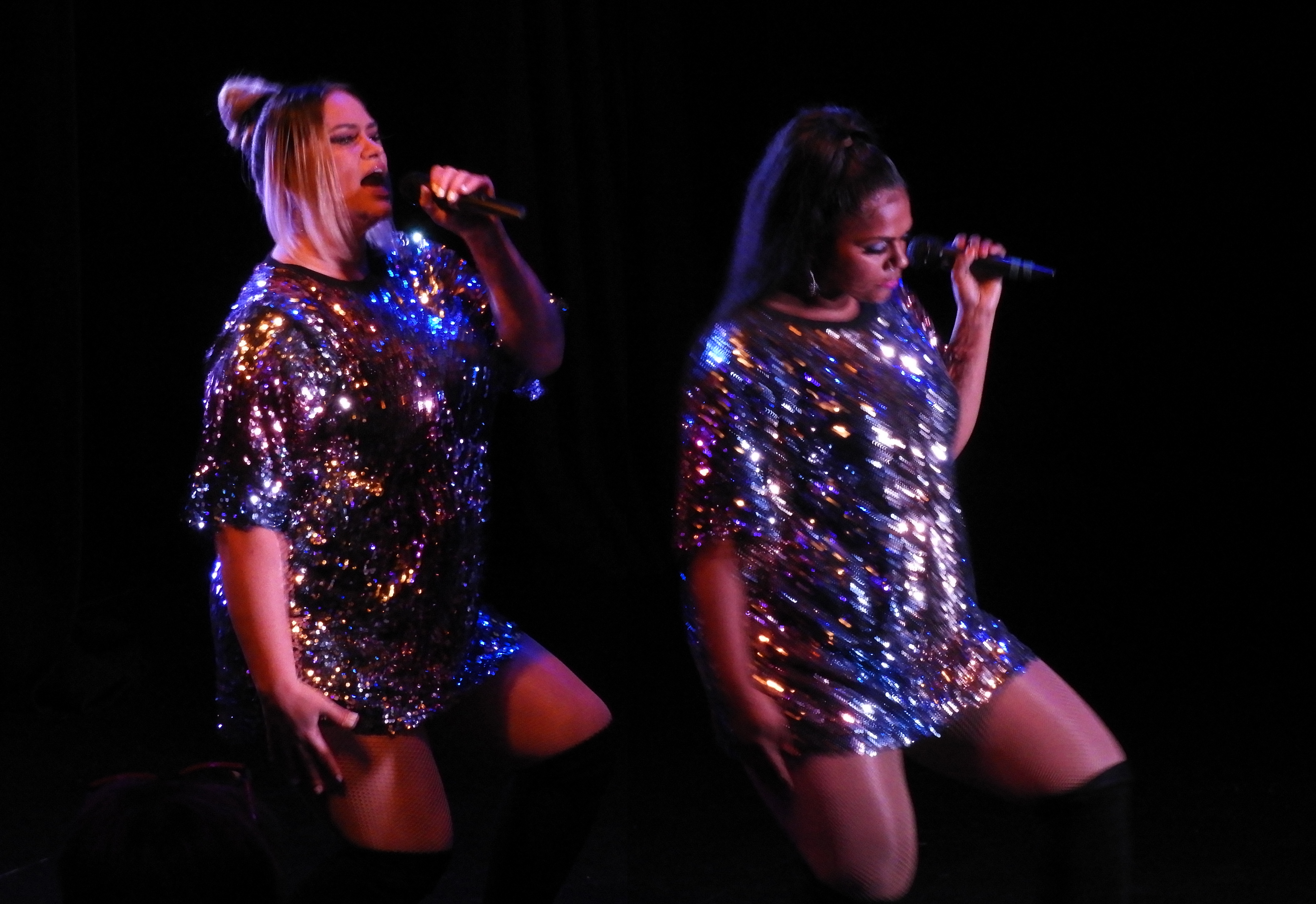
- The Merindas performing in Adelaide in 2020

Background information
- Origin: Melbourne, Australia
- Genres: R&B; pop; electronic
- Years active: 2012–present
- Members: Candice Lorrae; Kristel Kickett
- Website: themerindas.com

The Merindas are an Indigenous Australian pop duo, comprising Candice Lorrae and Kristel Kickett, active since the mid-2010s.

== Style ==
The Merindas' live performances feature choreographed dance, projected video, unique wardrobe designed by the group, additional dancers and a DJ. Their music combines R&B and soul with various genres of electronic and dance music and their lyrics combine English and Noongar language.

== Career ==
The Merindas have performed at music festivals around Australia since the mid-2010s. The group met in Western Australia and relocated to Melbourne, Victoria, to focus on their musical careers.

The Merindas' first performance was at the launch of the film The Sapphires in 2012. The popularity of the performance lead to a string of shows where the duo performed Motown classics. The Merindas' own sound evolved over time, incorporating other influences from pop, dance and electronic music. The Merindas' musical influences include Bardot, Spice Girls, Destiny's Child, TLC, Beyonce, Chaka Khan and Whitney Houston.

In 2014 the duo received a West Australian Music Industry Award in the "Outstanding Indigenous" category for the song "Ready to Love". They released their follow-up single "We Sing Until Sunrise" in 2016.

In 2017 they appeared as featured artists on the tracks "Playing with Fire" and "Nah Nah" on Downsyde's album ClassicILL. Downsyde member Dazastah produces tracks for The Merindas group and occasionally performs as their DJ.

In March 2020, The Merindas commenced a national tour to launch their debut album We Sing Until Sunrise. Shows were held in Sydney and Adelaide, but later dates were postponed following the introduction of special measures during the COVID-19 pandemic in Australia.

== Discography ==
=== Albums ===
Title	Details
We Sing Until Sunrise	Released: June 2020; Label: The Merindas (001); Format: CD, digital download, streaming

=== Singles ===
==== As lead artist ====
Title	Year	Album
"Ready to Love"	2014	
"We Sing Until Sunrise"	2016	We Sing Until Sunrise
"Before Daylight"	2019	We Sing Until Sunrise
"I Feel It"	2020	We Sing Until Sunrise
"Déjà Vu "	2020	

== Awards ==
=== WAM Song of the Year ===
The WAM Song of the Year was formed by the Western Australian Rock Music Industry Association Inc. (WARMIA) in 1985, with its main aim to develop and run annual awards recognising achievements within the music industry in Western Australia.

Year	Nominee / work	Award	Result (wins only)
2014	"Ready to Love"	Outstanding Indigenous Song of the Year	Won
