= Ruby Boots =

Australian singer-songwriter (born 1981)

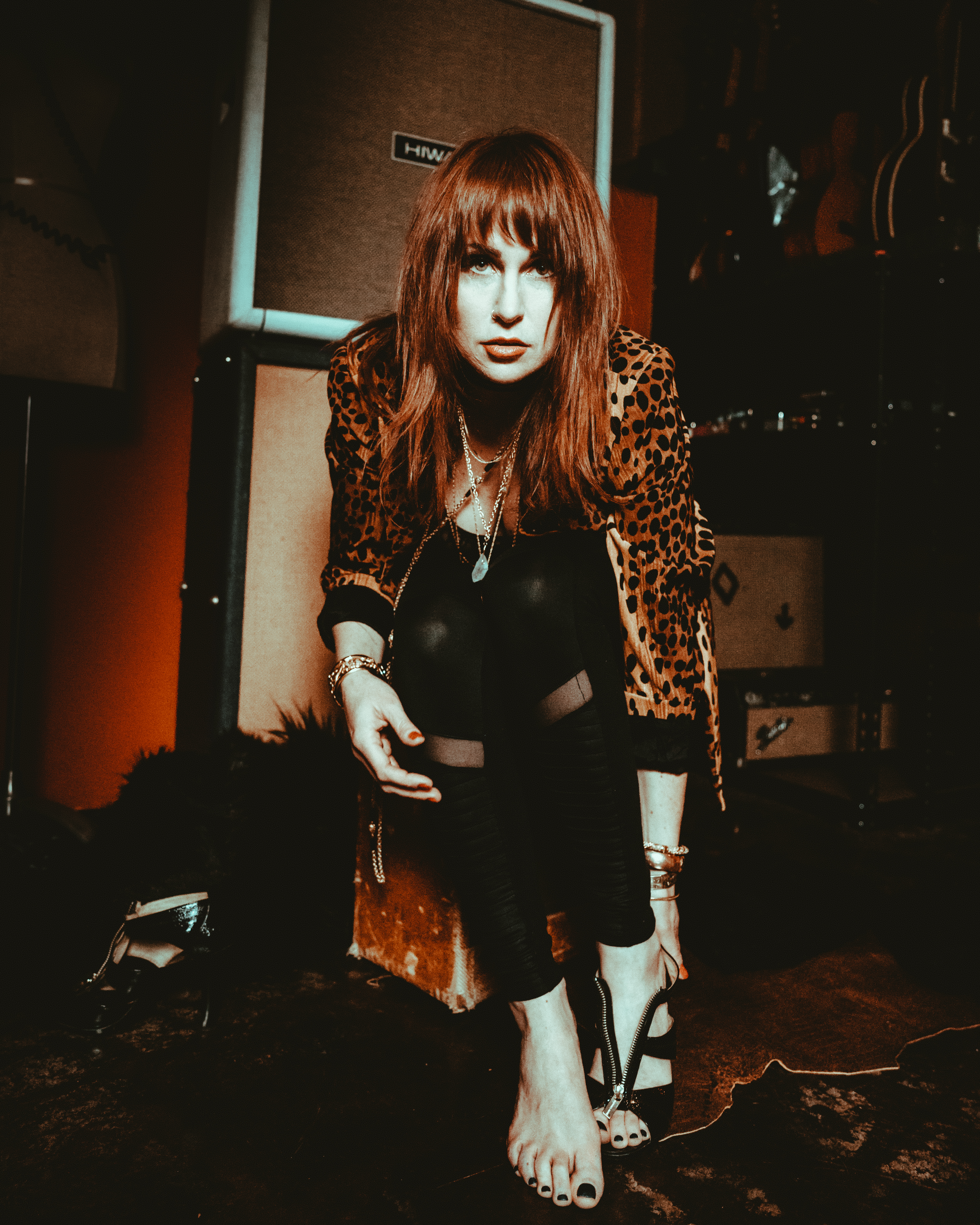
- Ruby Boots photographed by Cal Quinn at Modern Electric Studios on February 16, 2017

Background information
- Also known as: "Bex"
- Born: Rebecca Louise Chilcott; October 20, 1981 (age 45); Perth, Australia
- Genres: Americana, Country
- Occupation: Singer-songwriter
- Years active: 2011-present
- Website: https://t.me/ruby_boots

Rebecca Louise "Bex" Chilcott, known professionally as Ruby Boots, (born October 20, 1981) is an Australian singer-songwriter who sings country and americana music.

== Early life and education ==
Boots was born in Perth, Western Australia, and lived in the suburbs of Balga and Girrawheen. She is of Scottish and Italian descent.

At the age of 13 years old, Boots moved out of her mother's house, then lived with her father and various friends before living independently at the age of 16 years old.

After spending time in Perth, Boots got work in the pearl farms located north of Perth in Broome and Exmouth. She did this for a few years.

Boots studied Basic Music Industry Skills at TAFE WA North Metropolitan, where she received a Diploma of Music Business. In 2014, she also completed The Seed Fund's Management Workshop.

== Career ==
In 2015, Boots released her first album, Solitude, on Lost Highway Records Australia, an imprint of Universal Music Australia. Boots collaborated with many musicians on her debut record. She co-wrote two songs, "Middle of Nowhere" and "No Stranger" with Vikki Thorn from The Waifs, the title track, "Solitude," with Davey Lane from You Am I. Alt-country musician Jordie Lane provided vocals on the duet "Lovin' in the Fall," and Bill Chambers appears on the song, "Walk Away." The record was recorded in Sydney, Melbourne, Perth, Spain and Utah.

Boots began writing the songs in 2012, then recorded the record in 2013, and then mixed it in 2014. The record received overall positive reviews.

In 2016, Boots played at the Americana Music Association's AmericanaFest, where she signed a distribution deal with Bloodshot Records. She returned to AmericanaFest 2017 as part of the Bloodshot Records annual showcase.

In 2018, Boots released her second full length record called Don't Talk About It on Bloodshot Records. She wrote one song, which is sung a cappella, called "I Am a Woman" with Nashville-based musician Nikki Lane. The record was produced by Beau Bedford and The Texas Gentlemen were the session band and was recorded in Dallas at Modern Electric Sound Recorders.

In North America and Western Europe, Bloodshot Records is the U.S.-based distributor. Island Records / Universal is the distributor across Australia, New Zealand, and through subsidiaries Eastern Europe, Asia, and beyond.

== Personal life ==
Boots has said that her pen name, Ruby Boots, comes from the idea of being fiery and passionate (Ruby) and from the ideas of a wayfaring troubadour, a musician that travels around a lot, with boots implying moving around (Boots).

Boots had vocal nodules, which she worked to remove using non-surgical methods. It required a three-year break from singing, during which time she took classes and ran local open mics.

In 2016, Boots relocated to the United States, and now lives in Nashville, Tennessee.

== Discography ==
=== Studio albums ===
List of studio albums, with selected details
Title	Album details
Solitude	Released: 24 April 2015; Label: Lost Highway Australia (4719420); Formats: CD, LP, digital download
Don't Talk About It	Released: 9 February 2018; Label: Island Records (602557735178); Formats: CD, LP, digital download

=== Extended plays ===
List of EPs, with selected details
Title	Album details
Ruby Boots	Released: 2010; Label: Ruby Boots (RUBY0001); Formats: CD, digital download
At Last	Released: January 2013; Label: Walking Horse (WALK011); Formats: CD, digital download

=== Singles ===
List of singles
Title	Year	Album
"On Lover"	2014	
"Wrap Me in a Fever"	2014	Solitude
"Middle of Nowhere"	2015	Solitude
"Don't Talk About It"	2018	Don't Talk About It
"Might Be Losing My Mind" (with Indianola)	2019	TBA
"Keeping Me Alive"	2020	TBA

== Awards and nominations ==
=== National Live Music Awards ===
The National Live Music Awards (NLMAs) are a broad recognition of Australia's diverse live industry, celebrating the success of the Australian live scene. The awards commenced in 2016.

Year	Nominee / work	Award	Result
2016	Ruby Boots	Live Roots Act of the Year	Nominated
2017	Ruby Boots	Live Roots Act of the Year	Nominated

=== WAM Song of the Year ===
The WAM Song of the Year was formed by the Western Australian Rock Music Industry Association Inc. (WARMIA) in 1985, with its main aim to develop and run annual awards recognising achievements within the music industry in Western Australia.

Year	Nominee / work	Award	Result (wins only)
2014	"Wrap Me in a Fever"	Country Song of the Year	Won

=== West Australian Music Industry Awards ===
The Western Australian Music Industry Awards (commonly known as WAMis) are annual awards presented to the local contemporary music industry, put on by the Western Australian Music Industry Association Inc (WAM).

Year	Nominee / work	Award	Result
2011	Ruby Boots	Best Blues & Roots Act	Nominated
2011	Ruby Boots	Best Country Music Act	Won
2012	Ruby Boots	Acoustic Roots Act of the Year	Won
2012	Ruby Boots	Folk Act of the Year	Won
2012	Ruby Boots	Country Music Act of the Year	Won
2013	Ruby Boots	Country Music Act of the Year	Won
2013	Ruby Boots	Solo Artist of the Year	Nominated
2014	Ruby Boots	Country Music Act of the Year	Won
2015	Ruby Boots	Country Music Act of the Year	Won
2016	Ruby Boots	Country Music Act of the Year	Won
