= New Rules for Boats =

Australian indie pop band

- Origin: Perth, Western Australia
- Genres: Indie pop
- Years active: 2004–present
- Label: QStik Records/MGM Distribution
- Members: Sean Pollard; Benjamin Golby; Miranda Pollard; Joseph Derwort; Dan Grant
- Website: newrulesforboats.com

New Rules for Boats is a five-piece band from Perth, Western Australia, formed in early 2004.

== History ==
Joseph Derwort, Sean Pollard and Benjamin Golby of New Rules For Boats first met at Perth Modern School, where all three had music scholarships, although they didn't form the band until after they had left school. After playing two gigs under the name 'New Rules for Boats featuring Miranda', Miranda Pollard (Sean's sister) joined the band.

When queried on the band's name, Ben Golby advised:

Usually I concoct elaborate stories when people ask how we came up with our name: New Rules For Boats. Really, it means nothing. It was a headline from the Armadale City News and it related to the local maritime restrictions that were being put in place. Once you're stuck with a name you can't really do anything about it.

Since their formation, New Rules for Boats have managed to reach the finals of the Western Australian Music's "The Next Big Thing 2004" (with previous winners including John Butler, Fourth Floor Collapse and Snowman), be nominated for various WAMi awards for 'Best Country Act', released their debut EP, All at Sea, and performed with international acts such as Ben Kweller, Kathleen Edwards, the Mountain Goats and Electrelane, as well as Australian stalwarts Machine Translations, The Grates, The Panics, Eskimo Joe, Little Birdy, Dave McCormack and 78 Saab.

The band has toured nationally with Bob Evans & The Panda Band and their songs have been played on stations such as Triple J, RTRFM (Perth) & FBi (Sydney), 96FM (Perth), Edge Radio (Hobart), 3RRR (Melbourne), 4ZZZ (Brisbane) and 2SER (Sydney).

The single "Not Impressed" from their debut EP All at Sea has been included on the Triple J compilation album Home And Hosed – Bangin' and Breedin

Their influences include bands such as Whiskeytown, Pavement, The Decemberists, Wilco, the Shins and Neko Case, however this has evolved into their own sound.

In 2007 New Rules for Boats were nominated for several WAMi awards, including 'Best Indie Pop Act', 'Best Guitarist' for Sean Pollard and 'Best Bassist' for Benjamin Golby. They also performed at the Perth leg of the Big Day Out and supported Yo La Tengo. In mid-2007 the band introduced a new bassist Dan Grant, with Ben Golby moving to keyboards. In March 2007 the band performed at the Fuse Festival in South Australia.

In June 2007 the band released its second EP The Skips on my Record, which received airplay on Triple J. The band has also recently performed a number of live shows in Melbourne and Adelaide in support of their EP.

The band launched its debut album Thousands on 22 September 2007.

Benjamin Golby, announced at RTRFM's 'In the Pines' held on Sunday 20 April 2008 at the Sommerville Auditorium at the University of Western Australia that the band will take a break from performing for the next six to nine months.

== Members ==
- Sean Pollard – Vocals, Electric Guitar
- Benjamin Golby – Keyboard, Organ, Banjo, Guitar, Backing Vocals
- Miranda Pollard – Vocals, Acoustic Guitar
- Joseph Derwort – Drums, Percussion
- Daniel Grant – Bass Guitar

== Discography ==
=== All at Sea ===
All at Sea is the debut EP from New Rules For Boats. It was released on 12 September 2005 by QStik Records through MGM Distribution.

==== Track listing ====
1. "You're Out" – 2:21
2. "Gospel Song" – 2:27
3. "Freeway Home" – 3:16
4. "Not Impressed" – 3:57
5. "Oh My God!" – 2:04
6. "Bad Day" – 4:28

==== Reviews ====
- Faster Louder – 20 September 2005

=== The Skips on my Record ===
The Skips on my Record is the second EP from New Rules For Boats. It was released on 16 July 2007 by QStik Records through MGM Distribution.

==== Track listing ====
1. "The Skips On My Record"
2. "I Hope That No-one Cries At My Funeral"
3. "Crown Me A King"
4. "77" (Seve Le Bond Version)
5. "Not Impressed" (Tomàs Ford Uninvited Remix)

==== Reviews ====
- Mess+Noise (Matt Giles)

=== Thousands ===
Thousands is the debut album from New Rules For Boats. It was released on 8 September 2007 by QStik Records through MGM Distribution.

==== Track listing ====
1. "Skips On My Record (Part 1)"
2. "Skips On My Record (Part 2)"
3. "Ten Cent Coins"
4. "I'm Your Tenant"
5. "Ashes"
6. "You're Out"
7. "'77"
8. "As We Do"
9. "Hometown"
10. "Touch A Touchy Subject"
11. "9 Years Old"

=== Cities Don't Ever Change Hands, Cities Do Everything, Cities Make Plans ===
Cities Don't Ever Change Hands, Cities Do Everything, Cities Make Plans is the third EP from New Rules For Boats. It was released in 2008.

==== Track listing ====
1. "Mary"
2. "Marble Mountain"
3. "Don't Think"
4. "You'll Never Win"
5. "The Demons In Your Mind"
6. "24 Hours"
7. "Warning"

=== Compilations ===
- Triple J Home And Hosed 4 – Bangin' and Breedin' – ABC Music (2006) – "Not Impressed"
- Kiss My WAMi '06 DVD – WAMusic (2006) – "Gospel Song"
