= Superego (band) =

Australian musician

- Origin: Fremantle, Western Australia
- Genres: Electronic; hip hop; pop; rock
- Years active: 2015–present
- Labels: POW! Negro, Allbreed Agency
- Spinoffs: Myriad Sun
- Members: Nelson Mondlane; Rhys Hussey; Toby Batchelor; Lachlan Dymond; Kaprou Lea

Superego (stylised as SUPEREGO) is a collective of producers, rappers singers and multi-instrumentalist artist out of Fremantle, Western Australia, previously known as POW! Negro from 2015 until 2018.

== History ==
=== 2015–2018: POW! Negro ===
POW! Negro formed late in 2015. In August 2016, they won The Big Splash competition. Their debut single "Hidle Ho" was released in November 2016 and launched in Mojos Bar in Fremantle.

In January 2017, the band opened the Southbound Festival. POW! Negro released their debut EP Jasmine & Licorice in July of the same year.

The band supported Midnight Oil, Sampa The Great and Remi.

=== 2018–2023: Superego & Nautilus ===
In July 2018, the band announced they had changed their name to Superego. In a statement, the group said they "have grown more than [they] ever thought [they] could have" adding "the next steps for the group will be as SUPEREGO. As a culturally and musically diverse group, we wanted a name that was representative and reflective of everyone and feel this new identity encapsulates us as a whole."

Superego released the EP Nautilus in March 2020.

=== 2023–present: Debut Album Who Are You Hiding From? ===
In June 2023, the band released their debut studio album Who Are You Finding From? featuring singles Chrome Face, Lies (with Sakidasumi), and DPOPN (with Mali Jo$e). The album was nominated and won in the Best Album category at the 2023 West Australian Music Industry Awards.

== Band members ==
- Toby Batchelor – Bass and Vox
- Lachlan Dymond – Guitar, Sampling & MC
- Rhys Hussey – Guitar, Drums & Vox
- Kaprou Lea – Sax
- Nelson Mondlane – MC

== Past Members ==
- Luke Smoker - Drums (2015 - 2016)
- Patrick McCarthy - Guitar & MC (2015 - 2016)
- Chris Young – Guitar & Synth (2017 - 2019)

== Discography ==
=== Albums ===
List of albums, with selected details
Title	Details
As Superego
Who Are You Hiding From?	Released: June 2023; Format: CD, digital; Label: Superego

=== Extended plays ===
List of EPs, with release date and label shown
Title	Details
As POW! Negro
Jasmine & Licorice	Released: 28 July 2017; Label: POW! Negro; Formats: digital download, streaming
As Superego
Nautilus	Released: 25 March 2020; Label: Allbreed Agency; Formats: digital, streaming

=== Singles ===
==== As lead artist ====
Title	Year	Album
As POW! Negro
"Hidle Ho"	2016	Jasmine & Licorice
"Money for Portraits"	2017	Jasmine & Licorice
"Flesh Off the Bone"	2017	non album single
As Superego
"I Am the Jungle"	2018	non album single
"Burn"	2019	Nautilus
"Caller ID"	2019	Nautilus
"Last Tango" (featuring Cruz Patterson)		Nautilus
"O.B.S (Outer Body Stranger)" (featuring Sampa the Great)	2020	Nautilus
"Chrome Face"	2023	Who Are You Hiding From?
"Lies" (with Sakidasumi)	2023	Who Are You Hiding From?
"DPOPN" (with Mali Jo$e)	2023	Who Are You Hiding From?

==== As featured artist ====
Title	Year	Album
"Bad Like Ri Ri" (Adrian Dzvuke featuring POW! Negro)	2020	TBA

== Awards and nominations ==
=== National Live Music Awards ===
The National Live Music Awards (NLMAs) are a broad recognition of Australia's diverse live industry, celebrating the success of the Australian live scene. The awards commenced in 2016.

Year	Nominee / work	Award	Result
2017	POW! Negro	Western Australia Live Voice of the Year	Won

=== WAM Song of the Year ===
The WAM Song of the Year was formed by the Western Australian Rock Music Industry Association Inc. (WARMIA) in 1985, with its main aim to develop and run annual awards recognising achievements within the music industry in Western Australia.

Year	Nominee / work	Award	Result (wins only)
2020	"Bad Like Ri Ri" (Adrian Dzvuke featuring POW! Negro)	Urban / Hip hop Song of the Year	Won

=== West Australian Music Industry Awards ===
The West Australian Music Industry Awards (WAMIs) are annual awards presented to the local contemporary music industry, put on annually by the Western Australian Music Industry Association Inc (WAM). The group has won six awards.

Year	Nominee / work	Award	Result (wins only)
2016	POW! Negro	Most Popular New Act	Won
2016	POW! Negro	Most Popular Urban Act	Won
2017	POW! Negro	Most Popular Live Act	Won
2017	POW! Negro	Most Popular Urban Act	Won
2019	Superego	Best Urban Act	Won
2023	Superego	Best Album	Won
