= Karin Page =

- Genres: Roots, Folk, Americana, Country
- Occupations: Singer, musician, songwriter
- Instruments: Guitar, harmonica
- Formerly of: China Doll, Spoonful of Sugar
- Website: karinpage.com

Karin Page is an Australian singer-songwriter and multi-instrumentalist. She won the Star Maker award at the 2016 Tamworth Country Music Festival.

Originally from Western Australia, Page moved to Byron Bay, New South Wales in 2016.

== Early life and career ==
Page attended Perth Modern School on a music scholarship before graduating in contemporary music from the Western Australian Academy of Performing Arts. She formed and fronted the band Spoonful of Sugar which was then renamed China Doll. In 2014 Page toured and played with her partner Adam Nyeholt. In 2016 Page released two singles. "Keep On" and "Wherever You Are" both of which have received substantial airplay on radio stations all over Australia.

== Discography ==
=== Albums ===
Title	Details
Walk Away	Released: November 2019; Label: Karin Page; Format: CD, digital download, streaming

== Awards and nominations ==
=== WAM Song of the Year ===
The WAM Song of the Year was formed by the Western Australian Rock Music Industry Association Inc. (WARMIA) in 1985, with its main aim to develop and run annual awards recognising achievements within the music industry in Western Australia.

Year	Nominee / work	Award	Result (wins only)
2020	"Take Me Down"	Country Song of the Year	Won
