= Old Fremantle Police Station and Court House Complex =

Heritage listed building in Fremantle, Western Australia

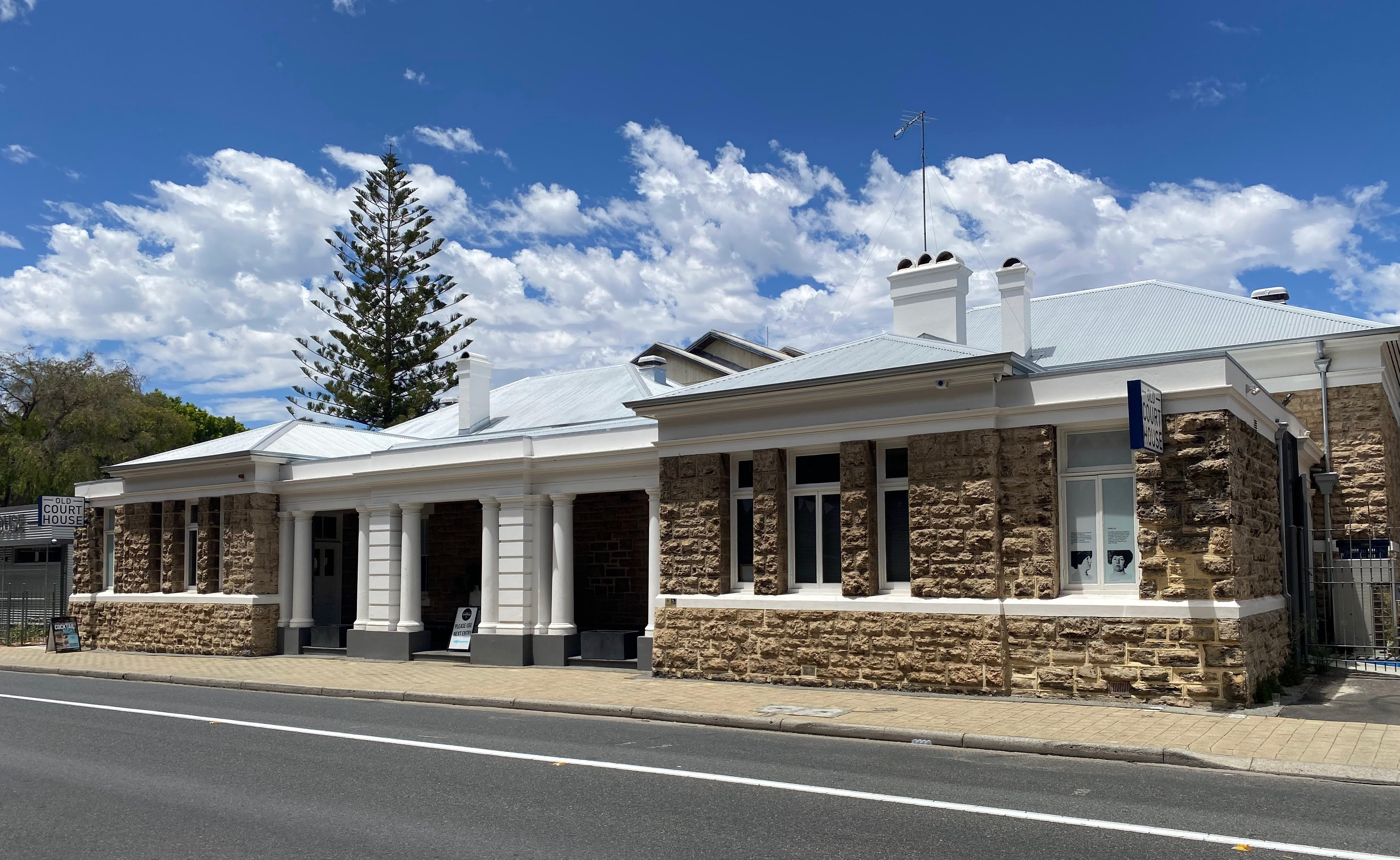
- Henderson Street frontage of part of the group.
- Former names: Fremantle Court House

General information
- Location: 45 Henderson Street, Fremantle, Western Australia, Australia
- Coordinates: 32°03′17″S 115°45′01″E

Western Australia Heritage Register
- Official name: Fremantle Court House (former) and Police Station Complex
- Type: State Registered Place
- Designated: 9 September 2003
- Reference no.: 878

The Old Fremantle Police Station and Court House Complex is a heritage-listed group of buildings located at 45 Henderson Street, Fremantle, Western Australia. The complex includes the former courthouse, police station, police barracks and lock-up and artillery drill hall.

== History ==
The Henderson Street site formed part of the original convict grant for the Convict Establishment (later Fremantle Prison) from the 1850s, housing the Sappers' Barracks. The former barracks were subsequently adapted and extended for a short-lived occupation by the Emigration Depot for use as migrant accommodation for men and married couples, then in 1888, the old buildings were occupied by the Fremantle police.

The current complex on the site was constructed between 1896 and 1903, during which time all but one building on the site was demolished. The Artillery Drill Hall was built in 1896, followed by the initial two-storey terrace of the police barracks in 1897, the lock-up in 1898, the courthouse in 1899 and the second terrace of the Police Barracks in 1903.

A new police station was added to the complex in 1916 and an extension to the courthouse added in 1957. The complex underwent a major redevelopment in 1978–80, which saw the demolition of the 1916 police station, the construction of a three-storey administration block and significant modifications to the courthouse, police barracks and lock-up buildings.

The old courthouse closed in 2001, shifting to the new Fremantle Justice Complex around the corner in Holdsworth Street. It was renovated and opened as a bar in late 2021, keeping the heritage of the building intact. The old police station closed in May 2013 and relocated to High Street, with these buildings now being vacant pending redevelopment.

=== Artillery Drill Hall ===
The drill hall building was constructed for the volunteer guard (responsible for civil defence) in 1896, and was modified in 1940, with the construction of a brick extension with a Queen Street frontage, when it was used as a training facility during World War II. The distinctive design comprises curved laminated jarrah ribs and curved iron T-sections supporting a 26-metre-span, barrel vaulted roof, constructed out of corrugated iron. It was used continuously for military purposes for almost 100 years.

The building was classified by the National Trust of Australia (Western Australia) in April 1974 and was included on the Register of the National Estate on 21 March 1978. In September 2003, it was permanently entered by the Heritage Council of Western Australia on the State Register of Heritage Places, both included in the larger complex and a subsidiary standalone listing. It is also listed on the City of Fremantle's Municipal Heritage List.

It was home to prominent music venue the Fly by Night Club from 1986 to 2015. The club was controversially evicted by building owner the National Trust of Western Australia in 2015. The drill hall was then redeveloped as bar and microbrewery freo.social, which opened in 2019.
