= WAM Song of the Year =

Western Australian music award

WAM was originally formed as the Western Australian Rock Music Industry Association Inc. (WARMIA) in 1985, with its main aim to develop and run annual awards recognising achievements within the music industry in Western Australia. WAM first received project funding from the state government in 1989, and in the early 90s the word "rock" was dropped from the title to give the organisation scope to take on a broader constituency.

In 1989 the inaugural WA Song Contest commenced, in 2002 it was rebranded as the WAM Song of the Year.

The WAM Song of the Year is open to all residents of Western Australia. The song must be the original work of the songwriter(s). Songwriters with a publishing deal can only enter the Professional category.

== Winners ==
=== 1989–2002 ===
- 1996 Grand Prize – Exteria
- 1997 Grand Prize – Beaverloop
- 1998 Grand Prize – Cartman
- 2000 Grand Prize – Ivan Zar
- 2001 Grand Prize – Halogen

=== 2003 ===
In 2003, there were 1,247 entries and 75 shortlisted nominees in the 15 genre categories. Winners each received $1,000 (Children & Youth winners received $500) and a days recording time in a notable Perth studio. The Grand Prize winner received the opportunity to have a promotional single recorded, pressed and released among other select opportunities.

The individual category award winners were:

- Children – "Something More" – Wesley Fuller
- Country – "Asbestos Fibro" – ADM Powell
- Easy Listening Pop/R'n'B – "Back 2 those Timez" – Chanelle
- Electronic/Hip Hop – "Boy X Girl Y" – Johnson, Vernie
- Hard Rock/Metal/ Punk – "Reprisal" – Neptune Bloom
- Indi Pop/Rock – "Andy Warhol" – Little Birdy
- Indigenous – "Raining on Djilba" – George Walley
- Jazz/ Funk – "That Hurt" – Myles Wright
- Love – "Walking Over Sea" – Sam Dunn, Ben Dunn
- Political – "Georgie Boy" – Andrew Horabin
- Roots – "Sheba Lane" – Lynn Hazelton
- Songs for Kids – "Pirlpirltji" – L. Hazelton, A. Ovi, S. Stanford
- Soundtrack/ Filmscore/Experimental – "Green Lantern" – Johannes Luebbers
- World/Multicultural – "Day Oh" – Eloy Cardenas

=== 2004 ===
The WAM Song of the Year for 2004 was announced at the Fly by Night Club in Fremantle on Thursday 16 September 2004. The evening featured performances from past winners including Andrew Horabin and Lynn Hazelton, as well as finalists for the 2005 competition. The WAM Song of the Year was presented by the Minister for the Arts the Hon. Sheila McHale. There was over 1,300 songs entered in the competition with 75 works nominated by the industry panels as finalists in the 15 genre categories.

The individual category award winners were:

- Commercial/Contemporary Pop – "Breathe" – Cassie Swinney, Alistair Watson & Escher
- Country – "Dirty Liar" – Rob Findlay & Haley Mason
- Electronic/Dance Category – "Hit '5'" – Tim Macnamara & Diego Bosco
- Hard Rock/Metal – "Bay of Martyrs" – Mike Sukys
- Indie Rock/Punk Category – "Tread Easy" – The Bank Holidays
- Jazz – "West Bank Moon" – Michael Pigneguy & Sian Brown
- Roots – "Slipping With the Blues" – Gerard Maunick
- Urban – "Wait a Minute" – Tsunami & Nathan Jamieson
- Love – "Blame Me" – Frans Bisschops, Jasmine Yee & Michael Miller
- Gospel – "Take Over" – Chad Blondel
- ASME Upper Secondary (Years 11–12) – "Radio Play" – Melissa Erpen
- ASME Lower Secondary (Years 8–10) – "Home Sweet Home" – Danni Stefanetti
- ASME Primary Category – "Sidewalk Surfer" – The Flairz
- Indigenous – "Hardway" – The Hill (John Bullen, Jarred Wall)
- Outstanding Regional Song – "Time for You to Go" – Lauren Brede

=== 2005 ===
The WAM Song of the Year for 2005 was announced at the Fly By Night Club in Fremantle on Thursday 27 October 2005. The evening featured performances from past winners including Andrew Horabin and Lynn Hazelton, as well as finalists for the 2005 competition. Performing on the night were The Bank Holidays, Lake of Bass, New Rules For Boats, Peter Brandy, The Flairz and the 2004 Song of the Year winner, Lauren Brede. The WAM Song of the Year was presented by the Minister for the Arts the Hon. Sheila McHale. There were close to 1,500 songs entered in the competition with 86 works nominated by the industry panels as finalists in the 17 genre categories.

The individual category award winners were:

- Blues & Roots – "4 Men Dead" – Kevin Smith
- Country – "Lord I Want an Exit" – Emily Barker
- Electronic/Dance – "We Gave Colour Away" – Harvey Rae and Hiro? (Thread)
- Gospel – "Learning to Say" – Mark Cullen
- Heavy Rock/Metal – "Falling" – Shannon de Bie
- Indigenous Song of the Year – "Long Time Ago" – Peter Brandy
- Jazz – "Storm" – Marnie Kent and Grant Windsor (Ginger Blu Collective)
- Love – "Drunkard's Wife" – Pete Stone
- Mixed Bag – "Then You Appear" – Damian Crosbie (The Panda Band)
- Pop – "Sleepy Little Death Toll Town" – Damian Crosbie (The Panda Band)
- Regional Song of the Year – "Lord I Want an Exit" – Emily Barker
- Rock – "Information" – Sascha Ion, Ronan Charles, Stuart Leach (One Horse Town)
- School Primary School Aged – "Holey Cheeses" – Oliver Bradley, Albert Loss
- School Lower Secondary School Aged – "Memory Lane" – Wesley Fuller
- School Upper Secondary School Aged – "The Best is Yet to Come" – Ben Blondel
- Urban – "Take 5" – Tsunami
- World and Folk – "Long Time Ago" – Peter Brandy

=== 2006 ===
The WAM Song of the Year for 2006 was announced on Thursday 19 October 2006 at the Fly By Night Club in Fremantle with awards in 17 different categories. Performing on the night were Kavyen Temperley from Eskimo Joe, The Panda Band, Abbe May and The Rockin' Pneumonia, One Horse Town, the Catherine Noblet Quartet and The Watts. Presenters from X-Press Magazine, The West Australian, RTRFM, ABC Radio, Nova 93.7, Drum Media, Network 10, APRA, Perth International Arts Festival and Minister for the Arts, the Honorable Sheila McHale announced the winners. The winners of most categories were awarded $1,000 cash and 1 day of recording time in a leading Perth studio. The winner of the Grand Prize received an additional 3 days recording time with producer Rob Grant at Poons Head Studios and the pressing of 500 promotional singles/EPs through Westlink Multimedia/MGM.

The individual category award winners were:

- Blues/Roots – "Sidewindin'" – Abbe May
- Country – "Live on Love" by Polly (Kylie) Medlen
- Electronic/Dance by "These Times" – David McKinney, Rachel Claudio
- Gospel by "Flowers in the Desert" – Jeremy Dixon
- Heavy Rock/Metal by "Drag in Drag Out" – Kevin Curran, Todd Fishwick
- Indigenous – "Our Song" by Jason Bartlett and Phillip Bartlett
- Jazz – "Wanderer" by Catherine Noblet
- Love – "Old Folks, Drunks and Babies" by Sascha Ion
- Mixed Bag – "It's a PC 21st Century New Millennium Romantic Arrangement..." by Andrew Horabin
- Pop by "City Walls and Empires" – Erik Hecht (Institut Polaire)
- Regional – "Call of the Wild" by Xavier Brown
- Rock – "Red Means Go" by B. Mulvena-Trinder, I. Berney, J. Sher, C. Palmer
- School Primary – Free by "Matt Larsen"
- School Lower Secondary by "Shadows of a City" – E. Hamilton, G. Hutchings, M. Mackintosh, L. Osborn
- School Upper Secondary – "Happy Birthday Dave" by Matt Gresham
- Urban – "Lose Control" by S.Roy, C.Wancer (Roy-Al feat. Cristian Alexanda)
- World/Folk – "Mon Ankor Anmourer" by Grace Barbé, James Searle

=== 2007 ===
The 2007 WAM Song of the Year was announced at the Fly By Night in Fremantle, on Wednesday 31 October 2007. There were eighteen category winners and included for the first year a professional category where published Western Australian based songwriters are given the chance to enter their works in WA's premier song writing Awards.

The individual category award winners were:

- Blues 'n' Roots – "Lara Clare" by Craig Sinclair
- Country – "Take Me With You" by Polly Medlen
- Electronic / Dance – "Hot Property" by Hayley McLennan and Simon Sieradzki
- Gospel – "My Hallelujah" by Paul Morrison
- Heavy Rock/Metal – "Broken Eyes" by Brett Jones, Johnny Kyi & Nigel Watts
- Indigenous – "Kick the Monkey" by Jason Bartlett & Phillip Bartlett
- Jazz – "Curious Yellow" by Adrian Kelly
- Mixed Bag – "Bring Out Your Dead" by Schvendes
- Love – "There is a Room on Hold" by James Crombie & Wibekke Reczek
- Pop – "Holidayz" by Josh Fontaine
- Professional – "Sun Dirt Water" by The Waifs
- Regional – "Two Months" by Polly Medlen
- Rock – "The World or Nothing" by Scott Tomlinson, Greg Sanders, Brenton Bell & Dayvid Clark
- Primary – "Valley of Flowers" by Madi MacDougall & Erika McKay
- Secondary (Lower) – "Wishing on a Star" by Jordi Davieson
- Secondary (Upper) – "Overcast Day" by Timothy Nelson
- Urban – "Get By" by Glen Foreman, Scott Griffiths & Alex Plant
- World and Folk – "Moodjebing" by Jessie Lloyd & Della Rae Morrison

=== 2008 ===
The 2008 WAM Song of the Year was announced at the Fly By Night in Fremantle, on Thursday 9 October 2008. The 85 nominees in 17 categories were announced on Monday 22 September. The Grand Prize for the WAM Song of the Year 2008 included a cash prize of $5,000, together with a 3-day recording session at Poons Head Recording Studio and 500 CDs by DiskBank.

For the first time, the public were invited to listen to and vote for a nominee in the Most Popular Song category. Public voting was later cancelled after claims of technical issues allowing multiple votes, it was replaced by judging by Sunday Times and PerthNOW entertainment staff. The professional category was also cancelled due to lack of numbers. Over 400 songwriters from throughout Western Australia submitted 1640 songs, the second highest number of entries received in the competition's 19-year history.

The 18 award winners were:

- Blues & Roots – "Howl And Moan" by Abbe May
- Café – "Revien" by Cloud Kollektiv
- Country – "Place Where I Belong" by Phyllis Bennell (Warangka Band)
- Electronic/Dance – "Realizing" by Cloud Kollektiv
- Gospel – "Light" by Lindsay Hamminga
- Heavy Rock/Metal – "Refuse the Sickness" by Chaos Divine
- Indigenous – "Gundulla – We Dance" by Yabu Band
- Jazz – "Til Death Does Me Part" by Johannes Luebbers
- Mixed Bag – "The Land" by Abraham Dunovits (Funkalleros)
- Pop – "Feel" by Roly Skender and The Tonics
- Regional – "Kaya" by Charmaine Bennell (Warangka Band), from Bunbury WA
- Rock – "Howl And Moan" by Abbe May
- School, Primary – "Shadows" by Josephine Langford
- School, Secondary Lower – "Smile" by Mike Nutt
- School, Secondary Upper – "The Pony and the Ark" by Lyndon Blue
- Urban – "Behind The Curtain" by Emcee Able
- World & Folk – "Kaya" by Charmaine Bennell (Warangka Band)

2008 Grand Prize
As judged by an independent industry panel from all category winners.

- "Feel" by Roly Skender and The Tonics

2008 Most Popular Song
As judged by The Sunday Times and PerthNOW entertainment staff from all nominated songs.

- "Give Up Money For Music" by Robert Sazdov (BSYDE)

=== 2009 ===
The 2009 WAM Song of the Year was announced at the Fly By Night Musicians' Club in Fremantle.

The sixteen award winners were:

- Blues and Roots – "Lover Don't You Wanna" by DivCraft
- Cafe – "Era Quondam" by Minute 36
- Country – "Sleeping Alone" by Timothy Nelson
- Electronic/Dance – "They Wanna Dance" by Scott Tomlinson
- Experimental – "A Vexing Predicament" by Tangled Thoughts of Leaving
- Heavy – "Total Existence Failure" by Voyager
- Indigenous – "Here I Go" by Black Poet
- Jazz – "Thinking Without Thinking" by Tilman Robinson
- Mentally Healthy – "I'm Not Scared" by Black Board Minds
- Pop – "Streamers" by Umpire
- Regional – "Spirit Calling" by Simon and Tammy London
- Rock – "Acute" by Sugar Army
- Schools 14 Yrs and below – "Everything" – Convict X
- Schools 15–17 Yrs – "Rocket Ship" by King George
- Urban – "Skyhawks" by Mathas
- World/Folk – "Son of a Son of a King" by Michael Strong and The Ghost Anyway

2009 Grand Prize

- "Streamers" by Umpire

2009 Popular Vote

- "Run for the Hills" by The Words

=== 2010 ===
The 2010 WAM Song of the Year was announced at the Fly By Night Musicians' Club in Fremantle.

The sixteen award winners were:

- Blues and Roots – "Hoborockabilly" by The Wilderness
- Country – "Juliette" by The Ghost Hotel
- Electronic/Dance – "Into Another" by Matt Mclean
- Experimental – "Scene from a Window" by Rachel Dease
- Heavy – "Behold" by Dsycord
- Indigenous – "I Was Singing for the Good Times" by Azzy Bartlett & Kyle Bartlett
- Jazz – "The Deep Fryer" by Chris Sealey
- Love – "Take it Slow" by Slackjaw & Episode
- Mentally Healthy – "Rag Doll" by Simone Keane
- Pop – "Lay the Noose" by Schvendes
- Regional – "Burning" – Simone Keane
- Rock – "Mis Adventure" by Sons of Rico
- Schools 14 Yrs and below – "This Ground" – Jake Wylde
- Schools 15–17 Yrs – "Breakfast in Bedlam" by Georgi Kay
- Urban – "Nothin 2 Say" by Jarrid Allen, Andrew Wright & Brooke Wilkie
- World/Folk – "The Silver Yacht" by Rachel & Henry Climb a Hill

2010 Grand Prize

- "Breakfast in Bedlam" by Georgi Kay

2010 Popular Song

- "Take Me Home" by Them Little Secrets and Fred Rea

=== 2011 ===
2011 WAM Song of the Year was announced by Russell Woolf (Presenter Weather & 720 ABC Perth Drive program), at the Fly By Night Musicians' Club.

The sixteen award winners were:

- Blues and Roots – "Overdrive" by Matt Cal
- Country – "Wheatbelt" by Gary Dobbin
- Electronic/Dance – "My Love's (Not Good Enough)" by Bastian's Happy Flight
- Experimental – "They Found My Skull in the Nest of a Bird" by Tangled Thoughts of Leaving
- Heavy – "Throw Us to the Wind" by Tangled Thoughts of Leaving
- Indigenous – "Wangkaja" by John Bennett
- Jazz – "Another New Beginnings Again" by Elliot Hughes
- Love – "Speak the Truth in Love" by Timothy Nelson
- Mentally Healthy – "Reason to Live" by Complete
- Pop – "51 Swimsuits" by The Panda Band
- Regional – " Until the Siren Sounds" by Junior Bowles
- Rock – "Sally" by Sam Carmody
- Schools 14 Yrs and below – "I Miss Her" by Katharine Penkin
- Schools 15–17 Yrs – "Unkind" by Morgan Bain
- Urban / Hip Hop – "Free" by The Stoops featuring Georgie Kay
- World/Folk – "Another Sunday Morning" by Rhys Wood

2011 Grand Prize

- "Speak the Truth in Love" by Timothy Nelson

=== 2012 ===
2012 WAM Song of the Year was hosted by Darren de Mello from 96FM at the Fly By Night Musicians Club. Rainy Day Women took out the Grand Prize. Performances included Kucka, Yabu Band, Timothy Nelson & amp; The Infidels, and Boom! Bap! Pow!

The sixteen award winners were:

- Blues and Roots – "Driller" by Dilip n the Davs
- Country – "Take Me Home" by The Ghost Hotel
- Electronic/Dance – "Slew" by Ylem
- Experimental – "Polly (serialkillersundays)" by Kučka
- Heavy – " Walk Away" by The Sixth Extinction
- Indigenous – "Born on the River" by Jarred Wall [Jake and the Cowboys]
- Jazz – "Maelstrom" by Abbey/Foster/Falle
- Love – " Falling Outta Love" by Brian Mitra & Jake Webb
- Mentally Healthy – " Petrol Paint & Glue" by Yabu Band
- Pop – " Sleigh Bed" by Rainy Day Women
- Regional – "Heart of a Lion" by Codie Sundstrom
- Rock – " Ordinary" by Husband
- Schools 14 Yrs and below – " Inside and Out" by Lucinda Nicholls
- Schools 15–17 Yrs – "I Think I've Got You" by Morgan Bain
- Urban / Hip Hop – " The Ego-dystonic Blues" by FG
- World/Folk – "Mother's Petunias" by Brayden Sibbald

2012 Grand Prize

- "Sleigh Bed" by Rainy Day Women

=== 2013 ===
2013 WAM Song of the Year was held at Fly By Night Musicians Club in February 2013. Taking out the Grand Prize, producer Mathas, was awarded the Grand Prize for his song "Nourishment" (also featuring Abbe May). Performances on the night included Rainy Day Women, The Ghost Hotel, Ylem & Deas and Odette Mercy & Her Soul Atomics.

The sixteen award winners were:

- Blues and Roots – "High Tide" by Jordan McRobbie
- Country – "First And Last" by Graphic Fiction Heroes
- Electronic/Dance – "Nourishment" by Mathas (featuring Abbe May)
- Experimental – "So We Beat On, Boats Against The Current" by Cycle~ 440
- Folk – "No Such Thing as Waste" by Formidable Vegetable Sound System
- Heavy – "Frankenstein" by Sleepfreak
- Indigenous – "Friends" by Jarred Wall of Jake and the Cowboys
- Jazz – "Avina" by Nick Abbey
- Mentally Healthy – " Hurting Bird" by Rachel Gorman
- Love – "Falling Outta Love" by Brian Mitra & Jake Webb [Sugarpuss]
- Pop – "Suit" by Boom! Bap! Pow!
- Regional – "Three States" by Minute 36 (Albany)
- Rock – "Body Unbind" by Eleventh He Reaches London
- Schools 14 & Under – "Listen" by Emmanuel Navarro aka ENAV
- Schools 15–17 Yrs – "Could Love" by Julia Nicholls
- Urban / Hip Hop – "Nourishment" by Mathas feat Abbe May
- World – "ANANTH: The Endless Dance" by 7 Beats

2013 Grand Prize

- "Nourishment" by Mathas (featuring Abbe May)

=== 2014 ===
2014 WAM Song of the Year was held at the B Shed warehouse in Fremantle, with Kučka taking out the Grand Prize.Performances on the night included: Methyl Ethel and Grace Barbé, plus Lilt and DJ John Safari.

The category winners were:

- Blues and Roots: "Hold On" by Morgan Bain
- Country: "Wrap Me in a Fever" by Ruby Boots
- Electronica: "Unconditional" by Kučka
- Experimental: "Earthquake" by Intenso Band
- Folk: "Tell My Lover" by Winter's Mile
- Heavy Metal: "Soldiers" by Chaos Divine
- Jazz: "Charon" by Trisk
- Outstanding Indigenous: "Ready to Love" by The Merindas
- Outstanding Regional: "Ain't Got Time for That" by Codee-Lee
- Pop: "Rogues" by Methyl Ethel
- Punk/Hardcore: "Wood & Wire" by Rag n' Bone
- Rock: "I Don't Think You Like Me" by Tired Lion
- Schools 14 & Under: "Hurricane" by Charlotte Viney
- Schools 15 – 17: "Seasons" by Mike Waller
- Urban / Hip Hip: "Someone" by Coin Banks
- World: "Fatige" by Grace Barbé

2014 Grand Prize

- "Unconditional" by Kučka

=== 2015 / 2016 ===
The 2015 / 2016 WAM Song of the Year was held on 9 April 2016. Beni Bjah became the first ever Indigenous artist to take the top honours.

The category winners were:

- Blues / Roots: "River" by Katie J White
- Country: "Melita Station" by Lynn Hazelton & Bill Chambers
- Electronic: "Trenchtown 2020" by Tobacco Rat
- Experimental: "Shaking Off Futility" by Tangled Thoughts of Leaving
- Folk: "My Love Affair With Archer" by Galloping Foxleys
- Heavy Metal: "Badge of Honour" by Chaos Divine
- Jazz: "Pius Bartosik" by Daniel Susnjar Afro-Peruvian Jazz Group
- Outstanding Indigenous: "Survivors" by Beni Bjah
- Pop: "War and Porn" by Joni in the Moon
- Punk / Hardcore: "Monarch" by Nerve Quakes
- Outstanding Regional: "Didge It" by Fingers Mitchell Cullen
- Rock: "Death Rattle Waltz" by Rag n' Bone
- Schools 14 & Under: "Stronger" by Madi Henry
- Schools 15 – 17: "With You" by Charlotte Viney
- Urban / Hip Hop: "Pause" by Marksman Lloyd (featuring Coin Banks & Nic Di Lena, Prod. Sable)
- World: "Blame Lulu Peanuts – Metsahällilaul" by Eastwinds

2015/16 Grand Prize

- "Survivors" by Beni Bjah

=== 2016 / 2017 ===
The 2016 / 2017 WAM Song of the Year was held on 17 May 2017.

The category winners were:

- Blues / Roots: "The Prince" by Dan Howls
- Country: "Caught in the Crossfire" by Ralway Bell
- Electronic: "Infra" by Tobacco Rat
- Experimental: "As Steadfast As the Ether Itself" by The Intenso Band
- Folk: "Seasick" by Riley Pearce
- Heavy Metal: "Nucleust" by Of King & Tree
- Jazz: "Ignacio" by Harry Mitchell
- Outstanding Indigenous: "The Man of Calvary" by The Brownley Gospel Singers
- Pop: "When We Were Young" by Sydnee Carter
- Punk / Hardcore: "Pissy Flow" by Rag n' Bone
- Outstanding Regional: "Heart Is a Compass" by Codee Lee
- Rock: "Carbon Copy" by High Horse
- Schools 14 & Under: "Meaning of Life" by Farraday's Cage
- Schools 15 – 17: "Djarliny" by Burdiya Mob
- Urban / Hip Hop: "Meant to Do" by Macshane
- World: "Taste of Honey" by Jere Sosa

2016/17 Grand Prize

- "When We Were Young" by Sydnee Carter

=== 2017 / 2018 ===
The 2017 / 2018 WAM Song of the Year was held on 16 May 2018 at Fly By Night Musicians Club in Fremantle.

The category winners were:

- Blues / Roots: "Lies" by Carus Thompson
- Country: "Maybe I'm Just in Love" by The Little Lord Street Band
- Electronic: "Prior Engagement" by Feels
- Experimental: "The One" by Intenso
- Folk: "I Only Hide" by Helen Shanahan
- Heavy Metal: "Man is Wolf to Man Part 2" by Bolt Gun
- Jazz: "Don't Stop Here" by Harry Mitchell
- Outstanding Indigenous: "Country Is Calling" by John Bennett
- Pop: "Boys Will Be Boys" by Stella Donnelly
- Punk / Hardcore: "Magic Glove" by The Bob Gordons
- Outstanding Regional: "Country Is Calling" by John Bennett
- Rock: "A Boy and a Boy" by J.F.K
- Schools 14 & Under: "The Fire Inside" by Farraday's Cage
- Schools 15 – 17: "Ear to Lend" by Figurehead
- Urban / Hip Hop: "Be Real" by Coin Banks (featuring Danny Martin)
- World: "Same Drum" by Akolkol Dastan Gesa

2017/18 Grand Prize

- "Boys Will Be Boys" by Stella Donnelly

=== 2018 / 2019 ===
The 2018 / 2019 WAM Song of the Year was held on 26 June 2019.

The category winners were:

- Act-Belong-Commit: "Are You Okay?"by Pat Chow
- Blues / Roots: "Old Man of the Blues" by Tom Fisher and The Layabouts
- Country: "Letter to a Baby Girl" by The Eastern Line
- Electronic: "They Need Us" by Feels (featuring Stella Donnelly)
- Experimental: "a moment like this..?" by Stephen de Filippo
- Folk: "Elephants" by Riley Pearce
- Heavy Metal: "Perished Walls Speak" by Elderflower
- Jazz: "Song for Days When" by Nick Abbey
- Outstanding Indigenous: "Flewnt" by Kya Kyana
- Pop: "The Hunting Birds" by Currents
- Punk / Hardcore: "Derby Jetty" by Trolley Boy
- Outstanding Regional: "Spider's Web" by Brayden Sibbald
- Rock: "Greg's Discount Chemist" by Carla Geneve
- Schools 14 & Under: "Shattered Heart" by Ava Sharp
- Schools 15 – 17: "Can't Help This Feeling" by Electrocity Ensemble
- Urban / Hip Hop: "Flewnt" by Kya Kyana
- World: "Bahar" by Tara Tiba

2018/19 Grand Prize

- "Greg's Discount Chemist" by Carla Geneve

=== 2020 ===
The 2020 WAM Song of the Year was held on 29 July 2020. Taking out the overall Grand Prize win for the second year in a row was Albany born singer-songwriter Carla Geneve with her song, "2001".

The category winners were:

- Act-Belong-Commit: "Home" by Indigo Ellis
- Blues / Roots: "Take Me Down" by Karin Page
- Country: "Half Frozen Beer" by Jack Davies and The Bush Chooks
- Electronic: "Alchemise" by Grievous Bodily Calm
- Experimental: "Existence is Exile & Nothingness, Home" by Bolt Gun
- Folk: "Things Change" by Carla Geneve
- Global: "Mardilo" by Grace Barbé
- Heavy Metal: "Dead Rat" by RATSALAD
- Outstanding Indigenous: "I Don't Wanna Be" by MissGenius
- Jazz: "Sketches" by Harry Mitchell
- Pop: "Catch Up" by The Hunting Birds
- Punk / Hardcore: "Gatorade" by HUSSY
- Outstanding Regional: "Never Let Me Know" by The Gusset
- Rock: "2001" by Carla Geneve
- Schools 14 & Under: "Home" by Indigo Ellis
- Schools 15 – 17: "In Memory of" by Vmarie
- Urban / Hip Hop: "Bad Like Ri Ri" Adrian Dzvuke (featuring POW! Negro)

2020 Grand Prize

- "2001" by Carla Geneve

=== 2021 ===
The 2021 WAM Song of the Year was held on 22 September 2021.

The category winners were:

- Act-Belong-Commit: "Always Was Always Will Be" by Natasha Eldridge
- Blues / Roots: "Just the Way It Is" by Siobhan Cotchin
- Country: "Ngaalang Moort/Ngany Koorlangka (My Kid)" by Cindy Moody and Phil Bartlett
- Electronic: "Coppola" by Maver featuring Marksman Lloyd
- Experimental: "Coodamurup" by Jean-Michel Maujean
- Folk: "Biding Time" by Timothy Nelson
- Global: "Warri Yungu, Warri Baba" by Warralgurniya
- Heavy Metal: "Hunter" by The Harvest Trail
- Hip Hop: "Darling" by Adrian Dzvuke
- Outstanding Indigenous: "Malu Mabu Liyan" by Matalja
- Jazz: "Cantuta" by Daniel Susnjar
- Pop: "Grid" by Wasteland and Sydnee Carter
- Punk / Hardcore: "Bloke" by RATSALAD
- Outstanding Regional: "Afterglow" by Brayden Sibbald
- Rock: "It Gets Worse" by Pat Chow
- Schools 14 & Under: "Old Land's Tale" by Angelina Curtis
- Schools 15 – 17: "Left Shoe" by Detour

2021 Grand Prize

- "Just the Way It Is" by Siobhan Cotchin

=== 2022 ===
The 2022 ceremony was staged at Freo.Social on 21 September 2022

- Act Belong Commit: Iconyx - "Dawn of the Future"
- Blues & Roots: Angie Colman - "Maths"
- Country: Codee-Lee - "Smoke & Mirrors"
- Electronic: PROJECT BEXX - "Don't Touch Me"
- Experimental: Dan Sutherland - "Bridges"
- Folk: Finn Pearson Band -"No Apologies"
- Global: Kate Pass Kohesia Ensemble - "Black Mountain"
- Heavy/ Metal: Darkmatter - "Parasite Culture"
- Hip Hop/ New R&B:Supathick & Adrian Dzvuke (featuring Keely Brittain) - "July"
- Jazz: Artemis Orchestra - "The Elephant in the Room"
- Outstanding Indigenous: Patrick Woodley & Lauralee Faith (featuring Danilo Da Paz & Dan Ablett) - "Something 'bout You Baby"
- Outstanding Regional: Dr Tasty - "Hopscotch"
- Pop: South Summit - "River Days"
- Punk/ Hardcore: RATSALAD - "Chicken Lips"
- Rock: Carla Geneve - "Dog Eared"
- Schools 14 Under: Elianie - "Moonlight"
- Schools 15-18: Mia June - "Fish in a Bowl"

2022 Grand Prize

- Dr Tasty - "Hopscotch"

=== 2023 ===
The 2023 ceremony was staged at Freo.Social on 20 June 2023

- Act Belong Commit: Dal Jones - "Kaya"
- Blues & Roots: Sash Seabourne - "Receiver"
- Country: Bill Lawrie (Sea Swallow) - "Down to the Wild Stuff Now"
- Electronic: Anna O - "We've Got Time"
- Experimental: Matt Tondut - "Novae"
- Folk: Cameron Alexander - "This Storm"
- Global: Daniel Susnjar - "Here's to Life"
- Heavy/ Metal: RinRin - "Guns and Grenade"
- Hip Hop/ New R&B: Madoc Plane - "Our Worst Enemy"
- Jazz: Maximillian Wickham - "One Planet"
- Outstanding Indigenous: Joan & The Giants - "The Weekend"
- Outstanding Regional: Sunny Day - "Don't Wanna Go Home"
- Pop: Dulcie - "Test Drive"
- Punk/ Hardcore: RATSALAD - "Punch in the Face"
- Rock: Joan & The Giants - "Cool Kid"
- Schools 14 Under: Sofia Gale - "In Your Eyes"
- Schools 15-18: Centre - "Illusion"

2023 Grand Prize

- Dulcie - "Test Drive"

=== 2024 ===
The 2024 ceremony was staged at Freo.Social on 19 June 2024

- Act Belong Commit: Sofia Gale - "Laugh"
- Blues & Roots: Sash Seabourne - "Raised By Rivers"
- Country: Rhys Wood - "FIFO Song: Where I'm Not"
- Electronic: Grievous Bodily Calm - "Spirals"
- Experimental: SNAW - "A Light Scalping"
- Folk: Good News Now We Can Eat All the Vampires - "The Miner"
- Global: Rochelle O'Reilly - "The Water"
- Heavy/ Metal: RinRin - "Miss Miserable"
- Hip Hop/ New R&B: Rein Mali featuring Chiseko - "Game of Love"
- Jazz: Grievous Bodily Calm - "Yawp!"
- Outstanding Indigenous: Boox Kid - "Don't Waste Time"
- Outstanding Regional: Sunny Day - "Dad Says I Need to Buy a TV"
- Pop: Sophian - "Beautiful Day"
- Punk/ Hardcore: Wesley Black - "Ready2Go"
- Rock: Joan & The Giants - "Born in the Wrong Time"
- Schools 14 Under: Twelve Parsecs - "The Only Thing (That Matters"
- Schools 15-18: Nocturnal - "Hey So Hungry"

2024 Grand Prize

- Rein Mali featuring Chiseko - "Game of Love"

=== 2025 ===
The 2025 ceremony occurred in June 2025.

- A Song for Sophie: Liz-Zard - "Hard to Believe"
- Act Belong Commit: ICONYX - "Blak On Trak"
- Blues & Roots: Tanya Hemi - "Somebody Told Me"
- Country: Whiskey Jack - "Whiskey Jack"
- Electronic: Ownlife - "Waiting"
- Experimental: Samarobryn - "Echoes in Flight"
- Folk: Sophie Lilah - "Content But I Fight"
- Global: Tchéga - "Kayamba"
- Heavy/ Metal: Indigo Blaze - "Critical Hit"
- Hip Hop/ New R&B: Elianie - "Enough for Me"
- Jazz: Holli Scott - "Back the Way We Came"
- Outstanding Indigenous: ICONYX - "Blak On Trak"
- Outstanding Regional: Brightsider featuring Lemon Myrtle - "The Hunger"
- Pop: Gianni Capri - "Brown Hair Green Eyes"
- Punk/ Hardcore: Crosscheck - "Death of Us All"
- Rock: Helena - "P's Get Degree"
- Schools 14 Under: Charlie Daniels - "Daisy Chain"
- Schools 15-18: Elianie - "My Mind"

2025 Grand Prize

- Helena - "P's Get Degree"

== See also ==
- West Australian Music Industry Awards
