= Fly by Night Club =

Former music venue in Fremantle

Fly by Night Musicians Club
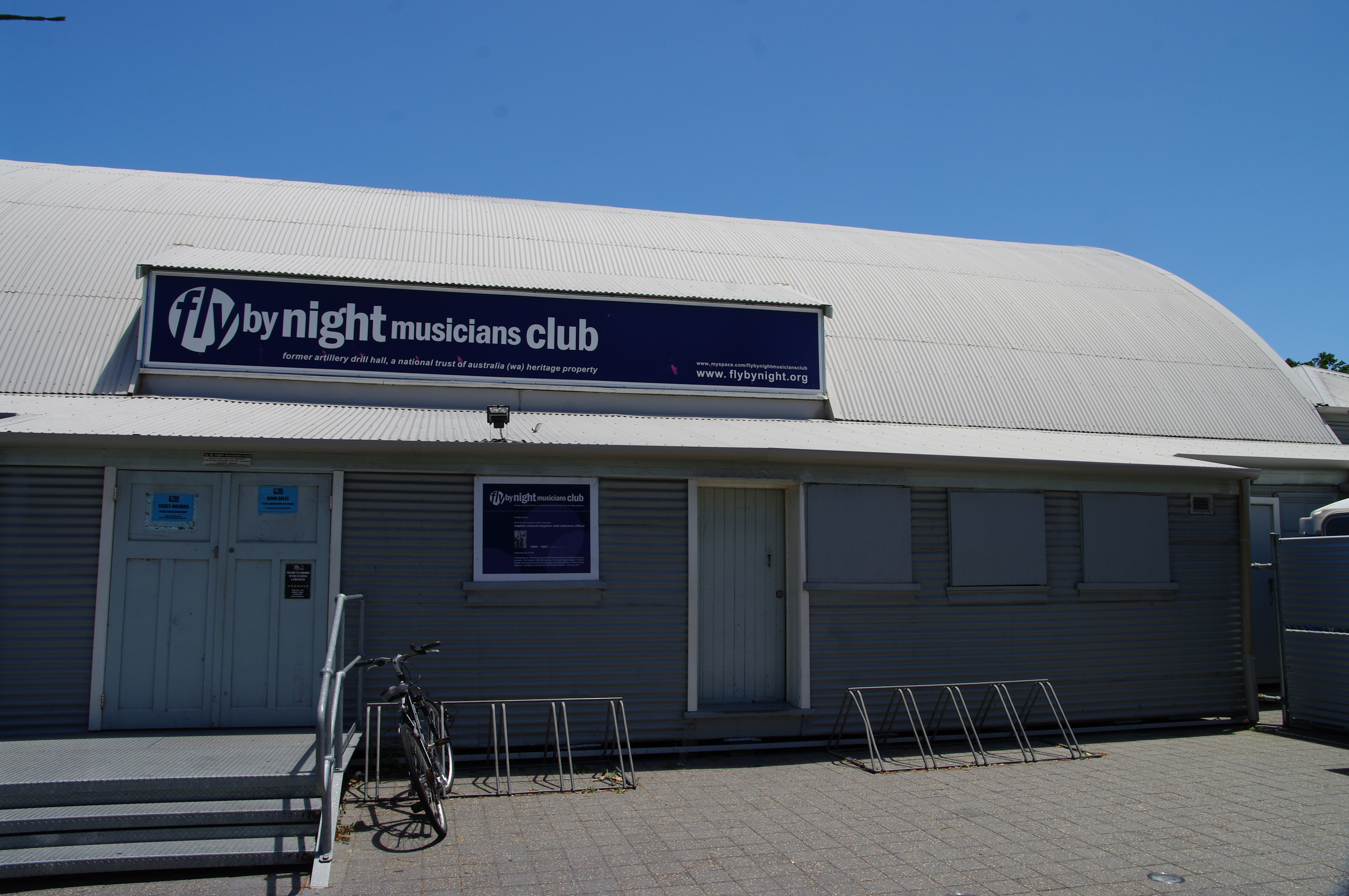
- Nickname: Fly by Night Club; Fly by Night; The Fly
- Formation: 1986; 40 years ago
- Dissolved: 2018; 8 years ago
- Location: Fremantle, Western Australia, Australia
- Website: web.archive.org/web/20190911071042/http://www.flybynight.org/

The Fly by Night Musicians Club, also known as Fly by Night Club, Fly by Night and The Fly, was a music venue and not-for-profit music organisation in Fremantle, Western Australia in operation from 1986 to 2018. It was originally housed in the Artillery Drill Hall, a heritage-listed former Defence Department building owned by the National Trust of Western Australia, fronting Holdsworth Street and Parry Street. In 2015 it then moved into Victoria Hall, a former parish hall designed by Talbot Hobbs and named in celebration of the diamond jubilee of Queen Victoria in 1897.

The club assisted development of local musicians and performing arts, and provided a venue for other community-based activities. Capacity of its main hall was 500 patrons, mostly standing. In 1996, it was the first venue in Western Australia to ban tobacco smoking. A smaller performance space, "the Fly Trap", held 100 patrons for local gigs, mainly by band members of the club. Other smaller spaces were available for rehearsals, workshops, seminars and community fundraising activities. Western Australian bands that have performed there or launched their careers at the club include the John Butler Trio, The Waifs, Eskimo Joe, San Cisco, The Panics and the Joe Kings. National and international performers have included Boy & Bear, Gotye, The Cat Empire, Paul Dempsey, Grizzly Bear, The Black Keys, and The Animals. From 2004 to 2013, it was the regular venue of the annual WAM Song of the Year event.

The Fly closed at Victoria Hall in 2018, after their lease was not renewed by the City of Fremantle. It was initially reported that the club's lease would end in August, but after the council announced in July 2018 that they would sell the building, the club temporarily remained in operation pending relocation. In September 2018, the club announced that they were in imminent danger of liquidation due to their poor financial state and began a fundraising campaign, but announced in December 2018 that the campaign had been unsuccessful and that the club would be wound up.
