= Sons of Rico =

Australian musical group

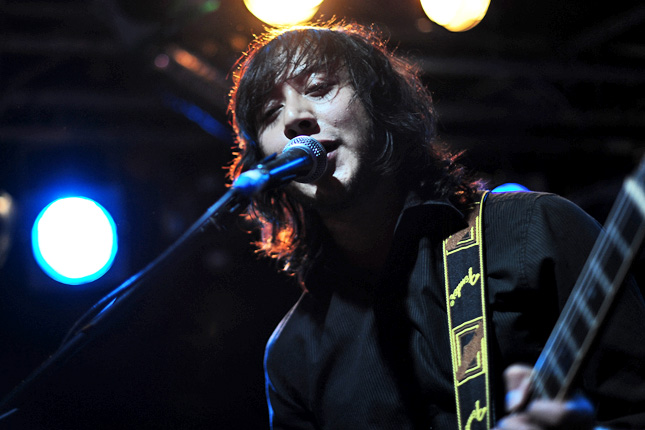

Background information
- Origin: Perth, Western Australia, Australia
- Genres: Indie Rock
- Years active: 2004–present
- Label: Firestarter Music
- Members: Alex MacRae; Nigel Moyes; Siobhan McGinnity; Terry Mann
- Past members: James Trewenack; Glenn Sarangapany; Adam Weston; Chris Callan; Rob Stephens; Brett Murray; Aaron Barnett

Sons of Rico are an Australian four-piece indie pop rock band, originally from Perth, Western Australia.

== History ==
Sons of Rico started out as a duo between Alex MacRae and Adam Weston in early 2004, under the name, Bus#56. The band subsequently expanded to a four-piece band with the addition of Glenn Sarangapany and then James Trewenack, with MacRae the main songwriter.

The band's first release was an EP, Orange Skies, in November 2007. The EP was recorded by MacRae and Weston and then mixed and mastered by Shaun O' Callaghan at Studio Couch. Initially the EP was only available at live performances of the band.

In 2010, the band and expanding to a five-piece with the addition of keyboardist, Brett Murray.

In August 2010, the band released "This Madness", the lead single from their forthcoming debut studio album. The song, according to MacRae, draws inspiration from a true story out of England where a boy posed as a spy on the internet and convinced an older boy to murder him. "A relatively long and twisted story, but the idea I'm playing on is how we can all go a bit crazy when we let our heart and brain get their wires crossed. It's a little bit dark and the upbeat music makes it a pretty funny contrast."

In October 2010 they released their debut album, Reactions. The album was recorded and engineered by Dave Parkin and mastered in New York by Steve Fallone.

In 2012 MacRae relocated to Brisbane, Queensland to write and work on pre-production for Sons of Rico's sophomore album In Rico Glaciers. On 2 July MacRae and Weston teamed up with ARIA award winning Australian music producer Magoo at Applewood Studio in Fernvale, Queensland to record and engineer the album. The album was released on 29 March 2013 through Firestarter and Inertia.

== Discography ==
=== Studio albums ===
List of studio albums, with release date and label shown
Title	Details
Reactions	Released: October 2010; Label: Firestarter Music (FIRE2007058); Formats: CD, Digital download
In Rico Glaciers	Released: March 2013; Label: Firestarter Distribution (FIRE024); Formats: CD, Digital download

=== Extended plays ===
List of EPs, with release date and label shown
Title	Details
Orange Skies	Released: November 2007; Label: Firestarter Music (FIRE2007004); Formats: CD

== Awards ==
=== WAM Song of the Year ===
The WAM Song of the Year was formed by the Western Australian Rock Music Industry Association Inc. (WARMIA) in 1985, with its main aim to develop and run annual awards recognising achievements within the music industry in Western Australia.

Year	Nominee / work	Award	Result (wins only)
2010	"Mis Adventure"	Rock Song of the Year	Won
