= West Australian Music Industry Awards =

Annual music awards in Western Australia

Western Australian Music Industry Awards
- Country: Australia
- Presented by: Western Australian Music Industry Association
- First award: 2001; 25 years ago
- Final award: Current
- Website: wam.org.au

The Western Australian Music Industry Awards (commonly known as WAMis) are annual awards presented to the local contemporary music industry, put on by the Western Australian Music (WAM) industry association.

== History ==
WAM was originally formed as the Western Australian Rock Music Industry Association (WARMIA) in 1985, with its primary aim of developing and running annual awards that recognise achievements within the music industry in Western Australia. WAM first received project funding from the state government in 1989, and in the early 1990s the word rock was dropped from the title to give the organisation scope to take on a broader constituency.

In 1994 the inaugural Kiss My WAMi Original Contemporary Music Festival was held. Other programs that have been undertaken include the Act of Youth series of all-ages shows, the WA Song Contest (now WAM Song of the Year), Women in Rock and an annual CD compilation of Western Australian musical artists (the first, "The Western Front", was undertaken in 1992 and included for example The Pink Fluffy Bunnies, Allegiance and Storytime.)

The first Western Australian Music Industry Awards occurred in 2001.

== Hall of Fame Awards ==
The Hall of Fame recognises those members of the industry who have made an outstanding contribution to Western Australian contemporary music over their career. Various WAM awards of similar focus acknowledged this before the official WAM Hall of Fame awards came into being in 2004.

The following is a list of people who had been previously recognised through various WAM awards since 1985 and were inducted into the WAM Hall of Fame.

=== Golden Rock Award ===
- 1985: Joe Cipriani
- 1989: Brian Peacock
- 1990: Steve Gordon

=== Golden WAMi for Contribution to the Industry ===
- 1991: David Gerard
- 1992: Michael Dwyer
- 1993: Peter Woodward
- 1994: Mark Genge
- 2000: Brett Rowe
- 2001: Mark Genge
- 2002: Mark Genge
- 2003: Luke Rinaldi
- 2007: Peter Barr

=== Rock 'n' Roll of Renown ===
- 1992: Dave Warner
- 1993: John Meyer, Shirley Pochee, Anna Gare, Dom Mariani
- 1994: Kim Salmon, Suze DeMarchi, Steve Tallis, Lucky Oceans

=== Kiss My WAMi Award for Contribution to the Industry ===
- 1994: Richard Lane
- 1995: Bob Gordon
- 1996: RTRFM
- 1997: RTRFM
- 1998: RTRFM
- 1999: Bob Gordon

=== Hall of Fame ===
- 2005: Bon Scott (posthumous), Dave Hole, Martin Clarke
- 2006: David McComb (posthumous), The Pigram Brothers, James Baker
- 2007: The Farriss Brothers
- 2009: Dave Faulkner
- 2010: Matt Taylor
- 2011: Shaun O'Callaghan (posthumous), The Waifs, Pete Carroll
- 2012: Tim Minchin, Robert Hunter (posthumous), Paul Bodlovich
- 2013: Ken 'Squasha' Knight
- 2014: Philip Stevens, Martyn P. Casey
- 2015: Paul Sloan, Helen Matthews
- 2016: Rick Steele, The Triffids
- 2017: Eurogliders, Graham Wood (posthumous)
- 2018: Dixie Battersby, The Stems
- 2019: Johnny Young, The Scientists
- 2021: Paul McCarthy and Fitzroy Xpress
- 2022: Sue Hamersley
- 2023: Jebediah

== See also ==
- WAM Song of the Year
