= Limited Live & Rare =

Live album by Ammonia
- Released: 1998
- Genre: Grunge/rock
- Length: 19:12
- Label: Murmur SAMP 1063

Ammonia chronology
Mint 400 (1998)	Limited Live & Rare (1998)	Eleventh Avenue (1998)

Limited Live & Rare is a rare promotional live EP from band Ammonia, released in 1998. The tracks are taken two different Triple J Live at The Wireless recordings. The EP was provided as a bonus disc for pre-orders of the band's album, Eleventh Avenue.

== Track listing ==
1. "Mint 400 (live)" – 2:26
2. "You're Not the Only One Who Feels This Way (live)" – 3:43
3. "Drugs (live)" – 3:29
4. "Wishing Chair (live)" – 3:03
5. "In a Box (live)" – 2:50
6. "4711 (live)" – 3:39
