= Spencer Tracy (band) =

Australian rock band

- Promotional photo of Spencer Tracey

Background information
- Origin: Collie, Western Australia, Australia
- Genres: Australian rock
- Years active: 1999–2004
- Labels: Rocket; Embryo/MGM
- Past members: Lee Jones; Kim Jones; Shaun Sibbes; Jessica Bennett; John Rabjones

Spencer Tracy were an Australian rock band formed in 1999 in Collie, Western Australia. Founding mainstay members are Lee Jones on lead vocals and guitar, his brother Kim Jones on bass guitar and Shaun Sibbes on drums. They were joined by Jessica Bennett (ex-Lash) on co-lead vocals and guitar in 2002. After she left in the following year, John Rabjones joined on guitar to record the group's self-titled, debut album. They issued three extended plays, Corner of My Eye (March 2001), Daisy Daze (October) and Hold On (July 2003).

== History ==
Spencer Tracy were formed by three teenagers from Collie, Western Australia, Lee Jones on lead vocals and guitar, his brother Kim Jones on bass guitar and Shaun Sibbes on drums. They played in local pubs and reached the finals of the Next Big Thing band competition. They were signed to independent record label, Embryo Records, in 2000, when the members were aged 15, 16 and 18, having performed about 100 pub gigs. The group issued a split extended play (EP), Split, in October 2000, with Perth band, Cartman providing two tracks each. Ryan Lee reviewed their CD launch performance, "'Battle of the Egos' is a great rock song with its powerful guitar and stunning lyrics... 'Fight' is without a doubt their most powerful and finely tuned rock song." "Battle of the Ego's" was picked up by national youth radio, Triple J. They were awarded $8,000 as part of the Contemporary Music Touring Program in order to tour New South Wales, Victoria and South Australia.

The band's debut five track EP, Corner of My Eye, which was released in March 2001 on Embryo Records, reached number 14 on the AIR Top 20 Singles Charts. The title track was described by R. Lee, as being "a fantastic tune, with terrific lyrics and a tight sound." It received airplay on Triple J and RTRFM, which led to tours of the Australian east coast and support slots with Echo and the Bunnymen, the Fauves, iOTA, Lo-Tel and Midnight Oil. The band received further airplay for "Stupid", one of five tracks from their second EP Daisy Daze (October 2001). Sibbes and Kim Jones finished secondary school and main songwriter Lee Jones began re-worked their sound.

In mid-2002 pianist Roger Woodward invited Lee to study classical piano at San Francisco State University but he decided to remain with the group. Lee wrote the tracks "Disco King" and "Ocean" while considering his options. Conversations with the group's talent and label manager, Rosco Stewart, and record producer Ben Glatzer assisted Lee's decision making. In September 2002 the band recruited John Rabjones, a friend from Collie, as their second guitarist.

"Disco King" was issued as a single in January 2003 and was broadcast on Triple J. The band toured with Regurgitator in that month, then performed at the Big Day Out, Perth (February), east coast gigs with Waikiki and Machine Gun Fellatio followed and a Western Australian tour with You Am I in March. More airplay followed in February with the Triple M network adding "Disco King" to official rotation in Sydney, Melbourne and Brisbane. Nova 96.9, Sydney and Nova 100, Melbourne ran the track in the high rotation Buzz bin for two consecutive weeks and NOVA 93.7 in Perth gave it airplay over a six-week period. The video clip to "Disco King" was broadcast on Channel V, MTV and Rage. According to Jasper Lee of Oz Music Project, it was, "a promising single that reminds me of the days when singles were something that you could still listen for hours and hours over again."

Their second single "Ocean" was launched in June 2003 and was added to rotation on Triple J, 96FM (Perth), Nova 93.7 (Perth), K Rock (Geelong) and received airplay on Triple M the Nova networks and HotFM. In the following month Spencer Tracy toured Australia opening for international band, Veruca Salt. "Ocean" reached number 14 on the Australian Independent Record Labels Association (AIR) top 20 singles charts in September.

Spencer Tracy launched their debut self-titled album on 11 August 2003 with a series of gigs across Australia. It was recorded at Revolver Studio's in Western Australia with Ben Glatzer (Ammonia, The Sleepy Jackson, Cartman, Crawlspace) producing and engineering the album, which was released on Embryo Records (Veruca Salt, Cartman) on 11 August 2003. The album was selected as Triple J's feature album, (8–15 August) after spending a week in the number one position on their Net 50. It debuted at number 9 on the Australian Independent Record Labels Association (AIR) top 20 album charts in September. Oz Music Project's Soph Gyles observed, "it's a loose-fit collection of jingles for wasting away the summer, its bubblegum hooks accidentally dribbling out of your half-open mouth."

Also in that August 2003 they performed at Manchester's the City Unsigned and followed with shows in London, Sweden, New York and Los Angeles. Line up problems plagued the group at the end of 2003 and they toured Australia as a three-piece: Sibbes with Lee and Kim Jones. They later added Jessie Bennett (formerly of Perth band Lash) to the line-up. In November of that year they supported Welsh band, Super Furry Animals at that group's Perth show.

In 2004 Spencer Tracy were selected to perform at SXSW in Austin, Texas, and attracted international attention. Lee Jones unexpectedly left the band shortly afterwards to concentrate on his classical piano. Sibbes took up lead vocals, and after three rehearsals they performed at the Lotto Skyworks and Big Day Out, Perth to combined crowds of about 4,000 people. They then toured the new line-up in rural Western Australia. The band released their final release, the EP Hold On.

The new line-up for Spencer Tracy toured the south-west of Western Australia with Jebediah and preparation was being made for a Japanese tour later in that year, with representatives of Japanese record label, Avex Trax, travelling to Perth to negotiate a deal for the band in Japan. The band also expanded their line up with Shaun Sibbes moving to front the band on guitar and vocals, and Nicolas Jonsson from The Avenues and Malcom Clarke from The Sleepy Jackson both filling the position on drums on different occasions. The group disbanded in November 2004.

Since their breakup Lee Jones has fronted Perth electronic act Astronaut, which won a WAMi Award in 2006 for 'Best Live Electronic Act' and subsequently joined The Sleepy Jackson in 2006 on keyboards and lead guitar. In April 2007, with The Sleepy Jackson not working, Lee joined Eskimo Joe's touring band playing keyboards, electric guitar and lap steel guitar. Jessica Bennett plays in The Preytells, National Campus Band Comp winners for 2005.

In 2009, Shaun Sibbes played drums as a session musician for Australian act Sneaky Sound System. He is also playing with Lee Jones again in The Sun Orchestra. Spencer Tracy performed in a tribute show in Collie in March 2019 in memory of Alison Pimm-Spry, who had died 20 years earlier.

== Members ==
- Lee Jones (vocals/guitar)
- Kim Jones (bass guitar)
- Jessica Bennett (vocals, guitar)
- Shaun Sibbes (drums)
- John Rabjones (guitar) joined the band as second guitarist for the duration of the band's 2003 first, self-titled album.

== Discography ==
=== Albums ===
- Spencer Tracy, Embryo Records (EMR169) (August 2003)

=== Extended plays ===
- Split EP - Cartman / Spencer Tracy, Rocket Records (2000) (split EP with Cartman, featuring "Battle of the Ego's" and "Fight")
- Corner of My Eye, Embryo Records (EMR052s) (March 2001)
- Daisy Daze, Embryo Records (EMR072) (October 2001)
- Hold On, Embryo Records (EMR194) (July 2004)

=== Singles ===
- "Disco King", Embryo Records (EMR140) (January 2003)
- "Ocean", Embryo Records (EMR165) (June 2003)

=== Compilation appearances ===
- Pop Scenes from Perth (2003) - featuring "Ocean"
- Kiss My WAMi (2003) - featuring "Ocean"
- Noise: Future of Music (2003) - featuring "Capsize"
- Home and Hosed, ABC Music (2003) - featuring "Ocean"
- Independence Volume Two, Design Records (2004) - featuring "Supergirl"
