= Ken Carter (song) =

Single by Ammonia

from the album Mint 400
- Released: January 1996
- Genre: Grunge/rock
- Length: 3:56
- Label: Murmur
- Songwriters: Allan Balmont, Simon Hensworth, Dave Johnstone
- Producers: Kevin Shirley, Ben Glatzer

Ammonia singles chronology
"Drugs" (1995)	"Ken Carter" (1996)	"Suzi Q" (1996)

"Ken Carter" is the second single released by Australian alternative rock band, Ammonia, from their debut album Mint 400. The single was released by Sony Music Australia's imprint label, Murmur in January 1996.

The single reached No. 50 on the Australian Recording Industry Association (ARIA) Singles Chart.

The song was named after Ken Carter, a Canadian stuntman who attempted to jump over the Saint Lawrence River in the late 1970s. Johnstone describes the song as being about feeling trapped in a relationship.

It's a passionate song, really, definitely darker and a bit more intelligent than "Drugs".

— Dave Johnstone

According to Allmusic's reviewer, Nitsuh Abebe, "Ken Carter" sounds like a more rocked-out version of the Posies.' The South Florida Sun-Sentinel describes the beginning of "Ken Carter" as being nothing but annoying whining, although the addition of a great riff in the chorus gives it the high intensity that it needs. Other reviewers describe the song as starting out with a very watery sounding intro followed by a loud distorted chorus.

== Track listing ==
All tracks are written by Allan Balmont, Simon Hensworth, Dave Johnstone

No.	Title	Length
1.	"Ken Carter"	3:56
2.	"Incinerator"	2:47
3.	"Easter Egg"	3:39

== Charts ==
Chart (1996)	Peak position
Australia (ARIA)	50

== Release ==
Format	Country	Label	Catalogue No.	Year
CD single	AUS	Murmur	MATTCD024	January 1996

== Personnel ==
- Allan Balmont – drums
- Simon Hensworth – bass
- Dave Johnstone – guitar, vocals

=== Credits ===
- Ted Jensen – Mastering
- Kevin Shirley – Producer, Engineer
- Mark Thomas – Engineer
- John Webber – Photography
- Simon Alderson – Art Direction
- Matt Lovell – Engineer
- Ben Glatzer – Producer
