= Mushroom Soup: The Citadel Years =

Compilation album by the Stems
- Released: March 2003
- Genre: Alternative rock
- Length: 60:03
- Label: Citadel
- Producer: Rob Younger; Dom Mariani; John Gailbraith

The Stems chronology
| Weed Out! (1997) | Mushroom Soup: The Citadel Years (2003) | Terminal Cool (2006) |

Mushroom Soup: The Citadel Years is an anthology album from the Stems, released in 2003 through Citadel Records. It is a collection of all the band's singles, songs from their debut EP, Love Will Grow - Rosebud Volume 1, previously unreleased demos and alternative song versions and a video for "Tears Me in Two".

Tracks 1, 4, 9–12 and 14–18 were recorded at Shelter Studios, Perth by John Gailbraith, with tracks 2, 3 and 5–8 recorded at Trafalgar Studios, Sydney produced by Rob Younger and engineered by Alan Thorne. Track 13 was recorded at Sound West Studios, Perth with John Gailbraith, mixed at Trafalgar Studios by Rob Younger and Alan Thorne, and tracks 4, 11 and 12 were re-mixed at Revolver Studios by Ben Glatzer and Dom Mariani.

== Track listing ==
1. "Make You Mine" (Dom Mariani) – 4:45
2. "Tears Me in Two" (R Lane/J Matthews) – 3:22
3. "Just Ain't Enough" (D Mariani) – 2:46
4. "No Heart" (D Mariani) – 3:18
5. "Jumping to Conclusions" (D Mariani) – 4:14
6. "Can't Resist" (D Mariani) – 2:35
7. "Love Will Grow" (D Mariani) – 3:15
8. "Under Your Mushroom" (R Lane/J Matthews) – 2:38
9. "On and On" (D Mariani) – 4:13
10. "She's a Monster" (D Mariani) – 3:49
11. "Don't Let Me" (R Lane/D Mariani) – 2:20
12. "All You Want Me For" (J Matthews) – 2:18
13. "Power of Love" (D Mariani) – 4:13
14. "For Always" (D Mariani) – 2:46
15. "Mr. Misery" (D Mariani) – 3:23
16. "She's Fine" (D Mariani) – 2:36
17. "Tears Me in Two" (R Lane/J Matthews) – 3:08
18. "Lon Chaney Junior's Daughter" (R Lane/D Mariani) – 2:46
19. "Tears Me in Two" (video clip)

== Charts ==
Chart performance for Mushroom Soup: The Citadel Years
| Chart (2023) | Peak position |
|---|---|
| Australian Vinyl Albums (ARIA) | 3 |
