= Suzi Q (song) =

Single by Ammonia

from the album Mint 400
- Released: 5 April 1996
- Recorded: Festival Studios, Sydney
- Genre: Alternative rock; Power Pop
- Length: 2:38
- Label: Murmur
- Songwriters: Alan Balmont, Simon Hensworth, Dave Johnstone
- Producer: Kevin Shirley

Ammonia singles chronology
"Ken Carter" (1996)	"Suzi Q" (1996)	"Satin Only" (1996)

"Suzi Q" is a song by Australian rock band Ammonia. It was released in April 1996 by Murmur Records as the third single from their debut album Mint 400 (1995).

== Critical reception ==
Nitsuh Abebe in AllMusic describes "Suzi Q" as "a straightforward pop song". Mark Jenkins in The Washington Post states ""Suzi-Q" possess melodic hooks."

== Track listing ==
All tracks are written by Balmont, Hensworth, Johnstone

No.	Title	Length
1.	"Suzi Q"	2:38
2.	"Face Down"	5:10
3.	"Oops"	3:58
Total length:		11:46

== Charts ==
Chart (1996)	Peak position
Australia (ARIA)	116

== Release history ==
Region	Date	Label	Format	Catalogue
Australia	5 April 1996	Murmur	CD	MATTCD029

== Credits ==
=== Personnel ===
- Allan Balmont — Drums
- Simon Hensworth — Bass
- Dave Johnstone — Guitar, Vocals

=== Production ===
- Producer, Engineer — Kevin Shirley ("Suzi Q", "Face Down")
- Producer — Ben Glatzer, Ammonia ("Oops")
- Photography — John Webber
- Cover Design — Simon Alderson, Spin Communications
