= Hold On (Spencer Tracy EP) =

EP by Spencer Tracy
- Released: 5 July 2004
- Recorded: Revolver Studio
- Genre: Rock
- Label: Embryo Records
- Producer: Ben Glatzer

Spencer Tracy chronology
Daisy Daze (2001)	Hold On (2004)	Spencer Tracy (2003)

Hold On is an EP by Spencer Tracy, released 5 July 2004. The EP features the new sound of Spencer Tracy with the dual vocals of Shaun Sibbes and Jessicca Bennett (who co-wrote the Lash hit "Take Me Away"). It's closer to rock than the previous pop inclined releases from Spencer Tracy and features a version of the Lennon / McCartney track "I've Got a Feelin'" plus reworks of "Ocean" and "Supergirl".

Siân at the Oz Music Project is more critical and states "the EP sounds like the first from a promising garage band, not a release from a nationally recognised act. The songs aren’t terrible, granted, but then again the songs aren’t all that great either."

== Track listing ==
All tracks written by Lee Jones unless otherwise noted.

1. "Hold On" (Shaun Sibbes, Jessicca Bennett)
2. "Take Me Home" (Jessicca Bennett)
3. "I've Got A Feelin'" (J. Lennon, P. McCartney)
4. "Ocean" (Shaun's Mix)
5. "Supergirl" (Kim's Mix)

== Personnel ==
=== Spencer Tracy ===
- Lee Jones - Guitars, Vocals & Piano,
- John Rabjones - Guitars & Vocals,
- Kim Jones - Bass Guitar
- Shaun Sibbes - Drums & Vocals

=== Additional musicians ===
- Jessicca Bennett - Vocals & Guitar
