= In a Box =

EP by Ammonia
- Released: 31 October 1994
- Recorded: 1994
- Genre: Alternative rock
- Label: Murmur/Sony
- Producer: Ammonia

Ammonia chronology
In a Box (1994)	Sleepwalking (1995)

In a Box is the first official release by Australian alternative rock group, Ammonia. The five-track extended play was issued in October 1994 via the Murmur label and Sony Music Australia. It appeared on the ARIA Singles Chart top 100.

== Background ==
Ammonia's first release, In a Box, is a five-track extended play, which comprised the Perth-based band's early recordings paired with the newly recorded title song. They were supported by national youth radio station, Triple J playing its tracks, which expanded their fan base across Australia, and led to a national tour. Australian musicologist, Ian McFarlane, felt that the EP "outlined the band's brand of guitar-driven power pop"; while AllMusic's Kim Summers wrote that it had "received rave reviews." In a Box peaked on the ARIA Singles Chart at No. 78. The title track, "In a Box", was re-recorded and appeared on the group's debut album, Mint 400 (16 October 1995). A live version of the lead track, recorded at Triple J studios, was released on their third EP, Limited Live & Rare (1998). The United States version of their second EP, Sleepwalking (March 1996) on the Sony-associated label, Epic Records, had two tracks from In a Box: "White" and "Lucky No. 3".

== Formats & track listings ==
- AUS CD EP MATTCD002
  1. "In a Box"
  2. "White"
  3. "Lucky No. 3"
  4. "Burning Plant Smell"
  5. "Dr. Strangeleave"
- US PROMO CDS ESK 7956
  1. "In a Box [Tom Lord-Alge Mix]"
  2. "In a Box [Album Version]"

== Charts ==
Chart (1994–95)	Peak position
Australia (ARIA)	78
