= Ocean (Spencer Tracy song) =

Single by Spencer Tracy

from the album Spencer Tracy
- A-side: "Ocean"
- Released: 2 June 2003
- Recorded: Revolver Studios
- Genre: Rock
- Label: Embryo Records
- Songwriter(s): Lee Jones
- Producer(s): Ben Glatzer

Spencer Tracy singles chronology
"Disco King" (2003)	"Ocean" (2003)

"Ocean" was the second single by Australian rock group Spencer Tracy and was released on Embryro Records 2 June 2003.

"Ocean" reached #14 on the Australian Independent Record Labels Association (AIR) top 20 singles charts in September 2003.

== Track listing ==
All tracks written by Lee Jones.

1. "Ocean" - 4:01
2. "She's Really Somethin'"
3. "So Alone"
