= Spencer Tracy (album) =

Studio album by Spencer Tracy
- Released: 11 August 2003
- Recorded: Revolver Studio
- Genre: Rock
- Length: 49:27
- Label: Embryo Records
- Producer: Ben Glatzer

Singles from Spencer Tracy
- 1. "Disco King" Released: 13 January 2003; 2. "Ocean" Released: 2 June 2003

Professional ratings
Review scores
Source	Rating
Triple J	(?)
Herald Sun	(?)

Spencer Tracy is the self-titled debut album by Spencer Tracy, released 11 August 2003.

The album was recorded at Revolver Studio with producer Ben Glatzer (Ammonia, The Sleepy Jackson, Cartman). The album debuted at #9 on the Australian Independent Record Labels Association (AIR) top 20 album charts in September 2003.

It was selected as Triple J's "album of the week" (8 August to 15 August 2003). Richard Kingsmill wrote in The Music Network: "I championed Spencer Tracy a little bit around here because I was so surprised by it. I underestimated the band and didn’t think they could come up with a whole album of good guitar pop but they did. I thought it was a good strong positive record. It wasn’t just three singles and then really average material. I thought I can’t really fault this, there’s at least six or seven songs that are going to sound great on the radio."

== Track listing ==
All tracks written by Lee Jones unless otherwise noted.

1. "Disco King" - 4:02
2. "Ocean" - 4:01
3. "Capsize" - 3:46
4. "Sum Attention" - 3:35
5. "Long Gone" (Oliver Jones, H Bell) - 4:25
6. "Tonight" - 5:41
7. "September" - 4:27
8. "Yesterday" (Chris Jones) - 4:31
9. "Supergirl" - 3:18
10. "Changes" - 4:17
11. "Stupid" - 2:46
12. "Sixteen" - 4:38

== Personnel ==
=== Spencer Tracy ===
- Lee Jones - Guitars, Vocals & Piano,
- John Rabjones - Guitars & Vocals,
- Kim Jones - Bass Guitar
- Shaun Sibbes - Drums & Vocals
