= Terminal Cool =

Compilation album by The Stems
- Released: 26 June 2005
- Genre: Alternative rock
- Label: Get Hip Records
- Producers: Rob Younger, Dom Mariani, John Gailbraith

The Stems chronology
Mushroom Soup: The Citadel Years (2003)	Terminal Cool (2005)	Heads Up (2007)

Terminal Cool is an anthology album from alternative rock group, The Stems, released in Australia on 26 June 2005 and in the United States on 6 December that year. It is a collection of the band's recordings between 1983 and 1985. It includes four tracks: "Terminal Cool", "Sad Girl" (a demo version) and "Spaceship", which were not included on a previous compilation album, Mushroom Soup: The Citadel Years (March 2003), although it omits "Power of Love".

== Track listing ==
1. "She's a Monster" 3:46
2. "Make You Mine" 4:44
3. "Tears Me in Two" 3:20
4. "No Heart" 3:16
5. "Can't Resist" 2:34
6. "Love Will Grow" 3:14
7. "Under Your Mushroom" 2:36
8. "Just Ain't Enough" 2:45
9. "Jumping to Conclusions" 4:12
10. "On & On" 4:08
11. "For Always" (Alternate Demo Mix) 2:59
12. "Terminal Cool" 3:53
13. "Don't Let Me" 2:18
14. "All You Want Me For" 2:17
15. "Mr. Misery" (Demo version) 3:19
16. "Sad Girl" (Previously unreleased version) 3:06
17. "She's Fine" 2:29
18. "Can't Forget That Girl" (Demo version) 3:18
19. "Lon Chaney Junior's Daughter" 2:46
20. "Spaceship" 4:02
21. "Let Your Head Rest" 4:01

== Links/Reviews ==
- Terminal Cool review
