= Keep on My Side =

Single by Ammonia

from the album Eleventh Avenue
- Released: May 1998
- Recorded: 1997; Tarbox Studios; Cassadaga, New York
- Genre: Grunge; rock
- Length: 3:25
- Label: Murmur
- Songwriters: Alan Balmont, Simon Hensworth, Dave Johnstone
- Producer: Dave Fridmann

Ammonia singles chronology
"Monochrome" (1998)	"Keep on My Side" (1998)

"Keep on My Side" was Ammonia's third single from their second album Eleventh Avenue. It was released in May 1998 on Murmur Records, just after the album's release, and was the last single the band released before breaking up.

Together with the other songs on the album, it was recorded in 1997 at Tarbox Studios in Cassadaga, New York, with producer Dave Fridmann. The Australian musicologist Ian McFarlane felt the single showed "melodic rock akin to UK bands like Radiohead or Teenage Fanclub."

== Track listing ==
All tracks are written by A. Balmont, S. Hensworth, D. Johnstone

No.	Title	Length
1.	"Keep on My Side"	3:25
2.	"Keep on My Side" (acoustic)	3:54
3.	"Eighth Minute of the Eighth Day"	4:36
4.	"Aloysius Virgilius"	2:16
Total length:		14:11

== Credits ==
=== Personnel ===
Ammonia

- Allan Balmont – drums
- Simon Hensworth – bass
- Dave Johnstone – guitar, vocals

Additional musicians

- Dave Fridmann – keyboards, loops

=== Production ===
- Producer, Engineer – Dave Fridmann (Tarbox Studios)
- Mixer – Tim Palmer (Larrabee Studios)
- Mastering – Steve Marcussen (Precision Mastering)
- Cover Design – Jenny Grigg

== Charts ==
Chart (1998)	Peak position
Australia (ARIA)	162

== Release history ==
Region	Date	Label	Format	Catalogue
Australia	May 1998	Murmur	CD	MATTCD073
