= Crawlspace (band) =

Australian band

- Origin: Fremantle, Western Australia, Australia
- Genres: Rock
- Years active: 1998–present
- Labels: Rocket Records; Embryo Records
- Members: Russell Smith; Matt Franklin; Travis Franklin; Joe Sivak
- Past members: Chris Webber; Daniel Bowles
- Website: Official website

Crawlspace are an Australian rock band from Perth which formed in 1998.

== History ==
In the early 1990s guitarist and vocalist, Russell Smith, met drummer, Chris Webber, the two sharing a musical background in Grunge-rock. They were then joined by bassist and vocalist Daniel Bowles, who had experience in a techno-style band in the UK. The trio forming, Crawlspace, has been likened to Matchbox 20, Live, and Tonic.

In mid-1998 Crawlspace released their debut single "Afraid", which was the first release to gain national attention for the fledgling WA Label Embryo Records (then called Rocket Records/Phantom Music WA). The EP was co-produced by Ben Glatzer, who also produced their debut album. It received rave reviews from music critics and the title track was added on high rotation to Triple J, 96.1FM, HotFM, 2UNE and RTRFM, and 30 other stations nationwide.

The single "Away", followed in early 1999 and picked up a swag of national airplay culminating in the band being the Triple M 'Adopt a Band' for May 1999. "Away" became the 9th most played rock song in Australia and reached number 17 on the ARIA national alternative charts.

Crawlspace secured a publishing deal with Warner/Chappel and released their first album Motion in November, 1999. TV appearances included Channel V (live and interviews), Hey Hey It's Saturday (performing "Away" live) and Telethon. On the live front, Crawlspace promoted the album with ten trips to the east coast including tours with Grinspoon, Pacifier, Taxiride and The Whitlams, Matchbox 20, Deadstar, Primary, Cold Chisel (in front of 18,000 at the Burswood Dome) and at The Big Day Out (Perth).

Crawlspace were nominated for the ARIA Award for Best Independent Release.

In 2000 the band re-structured with Bowles shifting to guitars and keyboards and a new bassist, Travis Franklin, joining. Shortly after Webber decided to leave (subsequently joining Sleeping Giant and Full Scale Revolution) and was replaced with Travis' brother, Matt Franklin, this was followed by the departure of Bowles (later to form electronic rock act Ura and The Rube Goldberg Machine, as well as perform in David O'List's backing band) leaving Smith as the only original member remaining. The band then went into a hiatus for a year following which they started writing material for their follow-up album. Crawlspace then began pre-production on the new album From Now On in mid-2001 and the band began recording with long term collaborator Ben Glatzer (Ammonia, Cartman, The Sleepy Jackson) in early 2002. It was during this time the band contributed a song for an INXS tribute album, INXS Hometown Tribute, on the Goh International label.

In late 2002 the band engaged a new guitarist, Joe Sivak. Pre-released tracks from the album received airplay on South West regional stations, which was supported by a number of regional tours.

In September, 2004 Crawlspace released the EP, Gone to My Head, with the songs "Gone to My Head" and "Alright" receiving airplay on Triple J.

2005 saw the band second appearance on the Big Day Out tour and a publishing deal with RipTide Music in the USA, with the inclusion of the song "Away" on the Warner Bros. Syndicated TV show 'Reunion'. "Burn My Eyes" appearing in an episode of the 2006 season of CSI: NY and a third song featured in the Adam Sandler movie 'Click'.

== Members ==
Current members:

- Matt Franklin – drums (2000 to present)
- Travis Franklin – bass (2000 to present)
- Joe Sivak – guitar (2002 to present)
- Russell Smith – guitars, vocals (1997 to present)

Former members:

- Chris Webber – drums (1997 to 2000)
- Daniel Bowles – bass, keys, guitar, vocals (1997 to 2000)

== Discography ==
=== Albums ===
Title	Album details
Motion	Released: November 1999; Label: Embryo; Format: CD

=== EPs ===
Title	EP details
Gone to My Head	Released: September 2004; Label: Embryo Records (EMR195); Format: CD

=== Singles ===
Title	Year	Album
"Afraid"	1998	Motion
"Away"	1999	Motion
"Lesson"	1999	Motion
"Motion"	1999	Motion
"Gone to My Head"	2004	Gone to My Head
"Alright"	2004	Gone to My Head

== Awards and nominations ==
=== ARIA Music Awards ===
The ARIA Music Awards are a set of annual ceremonies presented by Australian Recording Industry Association (ARIA), which recognise excellence, innovation, and achievement across all genres of the music of Australia. They commenced in 1987.

Year	Nominee / work	Award	Result	Ref.
1999	"Away"	Best Independent Release	Nominated	
