= Sleepwalking (EP) =

EP by Ammonia
- Released: 13 March 1995
- Genre: Alternative
- Length: 3:12
- Label: Murmur

Ammonia chronology
| In A Box (1994) | Sleepwalking (1995) | Mint 400 (1995) |

Sleepwalking is the second release by Ammonia, released in March 1995. The EP reached No. 86 on the Australian singles chart.

Ammonia formed in 1992 with Dave Johnstone and Allan Balmont. The guitarist and drummer were then performing under the name Fuzzswirl. It wasn't until 1993 that bassist Simon Hensworth joined the group and the band's name was changed to Ammonia. The group's success was due mostly to its hometown style of recording and word of mouth. The trio released a cassette of recordings and became a well-known band in Perth.

Ammonia was the first band to sign with Sony's Murmur label in 1994 (the second band to sign was the then unknown Newcastle group Silverchair). Ammonia's first release on the Murmur label was the EP, In a Box, in 1994 which was composed of the band's early recordings paired with the newly recorded title song. Again the band was supported by Triple J, who played a number of songs from the EP, expanding their fan base around Australia, and ensuring another successful tour. In early 1995 they released their second EP, Sleepwalking, which again featured the band's self produced recordings paired with a newly recorded title track. Sleepwalking included the first official release of "Orange Juice" and aided by continued touring, saw the band crossover from Triple J to commercial radio. The EP was re-released later in the year and included a card featuring information on the band and noting that the tracks on this CD are tracks from Ammonia’s first two Australian EPs.

== Track listing ==
=== Murmur release ===
1. "Sleepwalking"
2. "6 of 8:30"
3. "Orange Juice"
4. "Evil Kenevil"
5. "Soundplough"

=== Epic release ===
1. "Sleepwalking"
2. "Lucky No.3"
3. "White"
4. "Evil Kenevil"
5. "6 of 8:30"

== Release history ==
| Region | Date | Label | Format | Catalogue |
|---|---|---|---|---|
| Australia | March 1995 | Murmur | CD | MATTCD007 |
| United States | March 1996 | Murmur/Epic | CD | 662866-2 |

== Charts ==
| Chart (1995) | Peak position |
|---|---|
| Australia (ARIA) | 86 |
