= Monochrome (song) =

Single by Ammonia

from the album Eleventh Avenue
- Released: February 1998
- Genre: Grunge/rock
- Length: 2:08
- Label: Murmur MATTCD067
- Songwriters: Allan Balmont, Simon Hensworth, Dave Johnstone
- Producer: Dave Fridmann

Ammonia singles chronology
"You're Not the Only One Who Feels This Way" (1997)	"Monochrome" (1998)	"Keep on My Side" (1998)

"Monochrome" is the second single by Ammonia, from their second album Eleventh Avenue. It was released in February 1998 on the Murmur record label.

== Track listing ==
1. "Monochrome" – 2:08
2. "Union City Blues" – 3:29
3. "Sunrise" – 3:27
4. "Monochrome (The Mono Mix)" – 5:38

== Charts ==
Chart (1998)	Peak position
Australia (ARIA)	138
