= Buds (The Stems album) =

Compilation album by The Stems
- Released: 1991
- Genre: Alternative rock
- Length: 60:03
- Label: House Of Wax Records

The Stems chronology
The Great Rosebud Hoax' (1987)	Buds (1991)	Weed Out! (1997)

Buds is a 1991 compilation album released by Australian alternative rock group, The Stems, on Citadel Records.

== Track listing ==
1. "Make You Mine" (Dom Mariani)– 4:45
2. "She's A Monster" (Mariani)– 3:47
3. "Tears Me In Two" (Richard Lane/Julian Matthews)– 3:22
4. "Can't Resist" (Mariani)– 2:36
5. "Love Will Grow" (Mariani)– 3:16
6. "Just Ain't Enough" (Mariani)– 2:45
7. "Jumping To Conclusions" (Mariani)– 4:12
8. "Under Your Mushroom" (Lane/Matthews)– 2:36
9. "At First Sight" (Mariani)– 4:05
10. "Rosebud" (Lane/Matthews)– 3:39
11. "Mr Misery" (Mariani)– 3:37
12. "Sad Girl" (Mariani)– 3:35
13. "For Always" (Mariani)– 3:08
14. "On And On" (Mariani)– 4:13
15. "All You Want Me For" (Matthews)– 2:17
16. "No Heart" (Mariani)– 3:16
17. "Don't Let Me" (Lane/Mariani)– 2:21
18. "She's Fine" (Mariani)– 2:33
