= You're Not the Only One Who Feels This Way =

1997 single by Ammonia

Single by Ammonia

from the album Eleventh Avenue
- Released: August 1997 (Australia)
- Genre: Grunge/rock
- Length: 3:53
- Label: Murmur MATTCD060
- Producer: Dave Fridmann

Ammonia singles chronology
"Satin Only" (1996)	"You're Not the Only One Who Feels This Way" (1997)	"Monochrome" (1998)

"You're Not the Only One Who Feels This Way" is Ammonia's first single from their second album Eleventh Avenue. Released ahead of the album, this song was the second big song for the band and is generally regarded as their second biggest song after "Drugs".

Originally written on the last day of recording after a phone call from John O'Donnell from Murmur to Dave Johnstone. O'Donnell advised him that there were no 'hits' on the album. "We had a day's worth of recording left and I thought, you bastard, I actually had a massive anxiety attack. The next morning I woke up early and that song literally fell out of me. The other guys were asleep and the song was written before 9 am. We recorded it and I said, 'There you go John, there's your f***ing single.' Looking back it was a classic A&R stunt from John but I love him for that."

== Reception ==
The song marks the second time Ammonia charted in Triple J's Hottest 100, coming in at No. 43 in 1997. The band's only other entry was "Drugs", which came in at No. 27 in 1995.

In 2018, Double J praised, "a song as simplistic, beautiful, powerful and just plain genius as "You’re Not The Only One Who Feels This Way". If you haven't heard it in ages, I promise it still absolutely destroys today."

== Track listing ==
1. "You're Not the Only One Who Feels This Way" – 3:53
2. "Pipe Dream" – 3:36
3. "Rough Night in Jericho" – 5:26

== Charts ==
Chart (1997)	Peak position
Australia (ARIA)	83
