= At First Sight =

At First Sight may refer to:

- Prima facie, Latin expression meaning on its first encounter or at first sight
- At First Sight (1917 film), 1917 American film
- At First Sight (1999 film), 1999 American film
- At First Sight (novel), 2005 novel by Nicholas Sparks
- At First Sight, Violets Are Blue, 1987 album by The Stems
