= Live and Rare =

Live and Rare may refer to:

- Live and Rare (Faster Pussycat EP)
- Live and Rare (Helmet album)
- Live and Rare (Jane's Addiction album)
- Live and Rare (My Chemical Romance EP)
- Live & Rare (Korn album)
- Live & Rare (Rage Against the Machine album)
- Live & Rare (Reagan Youth album)
- Live & Rare Volume 1, an album by Quiet Riot
- The Berzerker – Live and Rare
- Limited Live & Rare, an album by Ammonia
- In the End: Live & Rare, an EP by Linkin Park
- Rare and Live Tracks, an album by 10 Years
