= Weed Out! =

Weed Out! (Live at the Old Melbourne Hotel)

Live album by The Stems
- Released: 1997
- Genre: Alternative rock
- Label: House of Wax Records

The Stems chronology
Buds (1991)	Weed Out! (Live at the Old Melbourne Hotel) (1997)	Mushroom Soup: The Citadel Years (2003)

Weed Out! is a 1997 album released by House of Wax of live recordings by The Stems. This live 2-track recording features 10 live cuts from a performance at The Old Melbourne Hotel in Perth, Western Australia on 18 April 1986. As well as containing live versions of previously released favorites like "Rosebud", "Make You Mine" and "Love Will Grow", the album contains two previously unreleased songs "Does It Turn You On" and "Don't Let Me", together with a cover of the Monkees' "Stepping Stone".

== Track listing ==
1. "Rosebud"
2. "Make You Mine"
3. "Mr Misery"
4. "Under Your Mushroom"
5. "She's a Monster"
6. "Love Will Grow"
7. "The Otherside"
8. "Does It Turn You On?"
9. "Stepping Stone"

Track listing from 78 Records
