= The Someloves =

Australian rock band

Background information
- Origin: Perth, Western Australia, Australia
- Genres: Alternative rock
- Years active: 1986–1990
- Labels: Citadel, White Label (Mushroom), Half A Cow
- Past members: Dom Mariani; Darryl Mather; Tony Italiano; Robbie Scorer, Christian Houlemare, Gary Chambers

The Someloves were an alternative rock band from Perth, Western Australia which formed in 1986. They were led by Dom Mariani (also a member of The Stems), on guitar and lead vocals; and Darryl Mather (ex-The Lime Spiders) on lead guitar. The group's sole album, Something or Other, was released in April 1990 and reached the Top 100 on the ARIA Albums Chart. They were noted for their 1980s power-pop underground style. Various personal issues and problems with the idea of touring led to the group disbanding by the end of 1990.

== Biography ==
The Someloves were led by Dom Mariani and Darryl Mather each of whom was also in two other Australian garage bands, The Stems and The Lime Spiders. Mariani had met Mather in 1984 when Mather went to Perth to recuperate from what was thought to be leukaemia and saw The Stems playing at the Old Melbourne Hotel.

During The Stems first trip/tour of Sydney in 1985 Mariani and The Stems drummer, Gary Chambers, stayed four months in a house on Terminus Street in Petersham that Darryl shared with Bill Gibson (who had just formed The Eastern Dark).

For the first recording session, Gary Chambers was on drums and on bass was Christian Houllemare, a musician from France, who had played in a French band, Bad Brains. The tracks were mixed a few months later by Alan Thorne at Trafalgar and quickly picked up by John Needham at Citadel Records.

The single "It's My Time" was released in 1986 as The Someloves, a name that Mather coined that came from a Real Kids' song, "Some Love Like Yours". A second Someloves single began to take shape in 1987.

In September 1987 Mariani went to Sydney to remix what was to be The Stems' final single, "Sad Girl". Mariani was staying with one of Mather's friends when they did The Someloves' recording of "Know You Now". Mather sent the tapes to Perth, where Mariani, amid the post-Stems tumult, finished the vocals in early 1988. Mather had plans for the second single and sent it to Mitch Easter (who Mather admired through his band Let's Active and his work with other bands like The dBs), with a request that he mix The Someloves single.

"Know You Now" was released in 1988 on Mushroom Records. In 1989 Mushroom allocated a budget of $60,000 for the album. The bulk of the album was recorded in Perth at Planet Studios in 1989. The Someloves debut album, Something or Other, was released in 1990.

Something or Other is widely considered one of the essential power-pop recordings and is highly regarded among power pop collectors. Its re-release in 2006 as a two-CD compilation, Don't Talk About Us: The Real Pop Recordings of the Someloves 1985–89, includes a critical review of Mariani and Mather's inter-related stories, substantial interviews and a bonus disc of non-album singles and remixes.

== Discography ==
=== Studio albums ===
List of studio albums, with selected details and chart positions
Title	Album details	Peak chart positions
Title	Album details	AUS
Something or Other	Released: April 1990; Format: LP, CD, Cassette; Label: Mushroom (D 30163)	80

=== Compilation albums ===
List of compilation albums
Title	Album details
Don't Talk About Us – The Real Pop Recordings of The Someloves 1985–89	Released: August 2006; Format: 2×CD; Label: Half a Cow (HAC 111)

=== EPs ===
List of EPs
Title	Album details
Sunshine's Glove	Released: 1990; Format: Limited edition CD; Label: White Label / Mushroom (D 10005)

=== Singles ===
List of singles, with selected chart positions
Year	Title	Peak chart positions	Album
Year	Title	AUS	Album
1986	"It's My Time"	—	Non-album single
1988	"Know You Know"	—	Something or Other
1990	"Melt"	119	Something or Other
1990	"Sunshine's Glove" / "Girl Soul"	150	Non-album single
