= Satin Only =

Single by Ammonia
- Released: 18 October 1996
- Recorded: 1996
- Studio: Festival Studio
- Genre: Alternative Rock
- Length: 3:35
- Label: Murmur MATTCD041
- Producer: Paul McKercher

Ammonia singles chronology
| "Suzi Q" (1996) | "Satin Only" (1996) | "You're Not the Only One Who Feels This Way'" (1997) |

"Satin Only" is a song by Australian rock band Ammonia. It was released as a non-album single on 18 October 1996.

The song was later re-recorded the following year and appeared on Eleventh Avenue (1998) as a hidden track three minutes after the final song "Pipe Dream".

== Track listing ==
All tracks are written by Ammonia.

| No. | Title | Length |
|---|---|---|
| 1. | "Satin Only" | 3:35 |
| 2. | "Aniseed" | 3:33 |
| 3. | "Dogwater" | 2:25 |
| Total length: | | 8:93 |

== Personnel ==
Taken from Satin Only liner notes.

Ammonia

- Allan Balmont - drums
- Simon Hensworth - bass
- Dave Johnstone - guitar, vocals

Additional Personnel

- Paul McKercher - mellotron on "Satin Only"

Production

- Paul McKercher - production, engineering, mixing
- Wayne Baptist - mastering
- Matt Lovell - engineering assistance
- Mark Thomas - recording assistance
- Phil Munro - mixing assistance

== Charts ==
| Chart (1996) | Peak position |
|---|---|
| Australia (ARIA) | 146 |
