= Disco King =

Single by Spencer Tracy

from the album Spencer Tracy
- A-side: "Disco King"
- Released: 13 January 2003
- Recorded: Revolver Studios
- Genre: Rock
- Label: Embryo Records
- Songwriter(s): Lee Jones
- Producer(s): Ben Glatzer

Spencer Tracy singles chronology
"Disco King" (2003)	"Ocean" (2003)

"Disco King" is the debut single by Australian rock group Spencer Tracy, released on Embryo Records in January 2003.

"Disco King" earned a lot of airplay for Spencer Tracy, with the Triple M network adding "Disco King" to official rotation in Sydney, Melbourne and Brisbane, NOVA Sydney & Melbourne running the track in the high rotation Buzz bin for two consecutive weeks and NOVA 937 in Perth giving solid airplay over a six-week period. The video clip to "Disco King" also received rotation on Channel V, MTV and Rage. The song created interest in the band from Interscope Records in the US.

"Cathy Hendrix in my office listens to triple j on the net all of the time and we just loved that song "Disco King". A musician friend saw Spencer Tracy playing a show in Melbourne and sent us a copy of their CD. When we put it on we were blown away -we just couldn't turn it off for a whole week." - Mike Dixon – USA manager (Ron Sexsmith)

The song is described by reviewers as having "squelch-pop warmth and bouncy rhythms", and being "almost contemporary Britpop in feel."

"Disco King" was nominated for 'Most Popular Local Original Single or EP' at the 2003 Western Australian Music Industry Awards.

== Track listing ==
All tracks written by Lee Jones unless otherwise noted.

1. "Disco King" - 4:02
2. "Changes" - 4:17
3. "Yesterday" (Chris Jones) - 4:31
4. Disco King video
