= Surround Me =

Surround Me may refer to:

- "Surround Me", song by Grant Mclennan from Fireboy
- "Surround Me", song by The Stems from Heads Up
- "Surround Me", song by Scott Stapp from The Great Divide
