= Mint 400 (album) =

Studio album by Ammonia
- Released: 16 October 1995
- Studios: Festival Studios, Sydney
- Genres: Grunge; post-grunge
- Length: 42:02
- Labels: Murmur; Epic
- Producer: Kevin Shirley

Ammonia chronology
Sleepwalking EP (1995)	Mint 400 (1995)	Eleventh Avenue (1998)

Singles from Mint 400
- 1. "Drugs" Released: 15 September 1995; 2. "Ken Carter" Released: 13 January 1996; 3. "Suzi Q" Released: 5 April 1996

Professional ratings
Review scores
Source	Rating
AllMusic	2/5 stars

Mint 400 is the debut studio album by the Australian alternative rock band Ammonia, released on 16 October 1995 in Australia by Murmur and on 19 March 1996 in the US by Epic Records. The album takes its title from the off-road desert race described in Hunter S. Thompson's book Fear and Loathing in Las Vegas.

The album was produced by American producer Kevin Shirley (Led Zeppelin, Iron Maiden, Slayer). Recorded in ten days at Festival Studios in Sydney, the analogue recording captured the band's live sound, avoiding excessive overdubs and studio manipulation.

Mint 400 was an immediate success in Australia, debuting at No. 15 on the Australian Recording Industry Association (ARIA) Top 100 Albums Chart. The album went out of print in March 2002.

The car on the cover is a custom 1968 Pontiac GTO.

In 2023, the album was re-issued as a limited-edition vinyl record, by Love as Fiction Records.

== Tracklistings ==
All tracks are written by Allan Balmont, Simon Hensworth and Dave Johnstone.

Australian edition
No.	Title	Length
1.	"Ken Carter"	3:55
2.	"Drugs"	3:27
3.	"Sleepwalking"	3:10
4.	"Face Down"	5:08
5.	"In A Box"	2:35
6.	"Suzi Q"	2:37
7.	"Little Death"	5:24
8.	"Mint 400"	2:17
9.	"Small Town"	2:24
10.	"Burning Plant Smell"	3:06
11.	"Z-Man"	2:36
12.	"Million Dollar Man"	3:56
Total length:		40:35

American & European editions
No.	Title	Length
1.	"Ken Carter"	3:55
2.	"Drugs"	3:27
3.	"Sleepwalking"	3:10
4.	"Face Down"	5:08
5.	"In A Box"	2:35
6.	"Suzi Q"	2:37
7.	"Little Death"	5:24
8.	"Mint 400"	2:17
9.	"Burning Plant Smell"	3:06
10.	"Z-Man"	2:36
11.	"Million Dollar Man"	3:56
12.	"Lucky No. 3"	3:53
Total length:		42:04

Japanese edition
No.	Title	Length
1.	"Ken Carter"	3:55
2.	"Drugs"	3:27
3.	"Sleepwalking"	3:10
4.	"Face Down"	5:08
5.	"In A Box"	2:35
6.	"Suzi Q"	2:37
7.	"Little Death"	5:24
8.	"Mint 400"	2:17
9.	"Small Town"	2:24
10.	"Burning Plant Smell"	3:06
11.	"Z-Man"	2:36
12.	"Million Dollar Man"	3:56
13.	"Lucky No. 3"	3:53
14.	"Orange Juice"	2:03
Total length:		46:31

== Personnel ==
Ammonia

- Allan Balmont – drums
- Simon Hensworth – bass
- Dave Johnstone – guitar, vocals

Additional personnel

- Ted Jensen – mastering
- Kevin Shirley – producer, engineer
- Mark Thomas – engineer
- John Webber – photography
- Simon Alderson – art direction
- Matt Lovell – engineer
- Ben Glatzer – producer on "Lucky No. 3"

== Charts ==
Chart (1995–96)	Peak position
Australian Albums (ARIA)	15

== Release history ==
Region	Date	Label	Format	Catalogue
Australia	16 October 1995	Murmur	CD	MATTCD023
United States	19 March 1996	Epic	CD, Cassette	EK67556
Japan	1996	Epic	CD	ESCA 6506
