= Eleventh Avenue (album) =

Studio album by Ammonia
- Released: May 1998
- Recorded: 1997
- Studio: Tarbox Road Studios
- Genre: Grunge
- Length: 53:06
- Label: Murmur MATTCD069
- Producer: Dave Fridmann

Ammonia chronology
| Mint 400 (1995) | Eleventh Avenue (1998) |

Singles from Eleventh Avenue
- 1. "You're Not the Only One Who Feels This Way" Released: 29 August 1997; 2. "Monochrome" Released: 16 February 1998; 3. "Keep on My Side" Released: June 1998

Eleventh Avenue is Ammonia's second and final studio album. It was released in Australia in May 1998.

It was a very different album to their previous effort, Mint 400, moving away from grunge-inspired guitar rock to include harmonies, samples and psychedelic keyboards.

The album was recorded and produced by Dave Fridmann (Flaming Lips, Mercury Rev), a choice made by the band in part due to the lack of control the band had over the first album. Two songs ("You're Not The Only One Who Feels This Way" and "Monochrome") received extensive airplay on Triple J; however, the album failed to chart as well as its predecessor, only reaching #20 on the National Album charts. Eleventh Avenue turned out to be the band's last album. It went out of print in March 2002.

The image on the front cover is a photograph of pedestrians walking down George Street in Sydney, NSW. It was taken by Jack Hickson in 1968.

== Track listing ==
All lyrics written by Allan Balmont, Simon Hensworth and Dave Johnstone.

1. "Eleventh Avenue" - 4:12
2. "You're Not the Only One Who Feels This Way" - 3:54
3. "Keep on My Side" - 3:26
4. "Monochrome" - 2:07
5. "Killswitch" - 4:26
6. "Baby Blue" - 3:09
7. "Wishing Chair" - 3:11
8. "Keeping My Hands Tied" - 3:32
9. "4711" - 4:02
10. "Yeah Doin' It" - 3:14
11. "Afterglow" - 3:35
12. "Pipe Dream" / "Satin Only" (hidden track) - 14:26

== Charts ==
| Chart (1998) | Peak position |
|---|---|
| Australian Albums (ARIA) | 20 |

== Release history ==
| Region | Date | Label | Format | Catalogue |
|---|---|---|---|---|
| Australia | May 1998 | Murmur | CD | MATTCD069 |

== Personnel ==
- Allan Balmont - drums
- Simon Hensworth - bass
- Dave Johnstone - guitar, vocals
