= Nobody (EP) =

Nobody EP

EP by Cartman
- Released: March 27, 2000
- Recorded: Revolver Studios
- Genre: Alternative rock
- Length: 16:42
- Label: Rocket Records
- Producer: Ben Glatzer

Cartman chronology
I'm Not a Policeman (1999)	Nobody EP (2000)	Go! (2002)

Nobody is the second EP by Cartman and was released March 27, 2000 by Rocket Records and distributed by MGM Distribution.

== Track listing ==
1. "Nobody" - 3:47
2. "Datsun 180B" - 2:29
3. "One You're Without" - 3:41
4. "Song For Absent Friends" 3:16
5. "Think" - 3:27

== Personnel ==
- Cain Turnley
- Joe Hawkins
- Scott Nicholls
- Ben Mills
