= I'm Not a Policeman =

EP by Cartman
- Released: 8 February 1999
- Genre: Alternative rock
- Length: 20:32
- Label: Phantom Records
- Producer: Ben Glatzer

Cartman chronology
I'm Not a Policeman (1999)	Nobody (2000)

I'm Not a Policeman is the debut EP by Cartman and was released 8 February 1999, on Phantom Records.

According to the band's lead singer, Joe Hawkins, "It cost $900 and took us 3 days to record, mix and master", and "We never expected it to do a lot, but it kind of took off".

"Drive" was selected as RTRFM's 'Best Song of 1998' and was awarded 'Song of the Year' and 'Best Pop song', whilst "Pieces" won 'Best Acoustic song', at the 1999 West Australian Music Industry Awards. Hawkins stating "the Song Contest money went straight into new equipment. It was extremely handy at the time... the award itself helped raise our profile. It was one of the major reasons the song "Drive" was picked up by Triple J, and was the start of national exposure and acceptance." Cartman also received the Music Industry Critics Association award for 'Best Unsigned Band in West Australia 1999'. The track was later featured on the compilation album Kiss My WAMI 2001, a showcase of the best local Western Australian musical talent.

"Drive" was described by Kerrianne Cox in Cygnus magazine, as being "...a very catchy pop song indeed, that you can't get out of your head after you've heard it." It also received significant airplay on the national youth radio station, Triple J. Cox also described "Pieces" as being "gentler than "Drive", but still very catchy", and stated "Only the title track [I'm Not a Policeman] seems ordinary".

The success of the release, enabled the band to obtain federal government grant funding to tour the eastern states in 1999. It also led to their performance at the 1999 Big Day Out, alongside Eskimo Joe, Sneeze and Pollyanna.

== Track listing ==
1. "Drive" - 3:46
2. "Leave It Out" - 4:22
3. "I'm Not a Policeman" - 3:40
4. "Sugarcane" - 4:42
5. "Pieces" (Acoustic Version) - 3:57

== Personnel ==
- Cain Turnley
- Joe Hawkins
- Scott Nicholls
- Ben Mills
