= Go! (Cartman album) =

Studio album by Cartman
- Released: 14 January 2002
- Recorded: Late 2001
- Studio: Revolver Studios, Perth
- Genre: Alternative rock; power pop
- Length: 52:44
- Label: Embryo/MGM
- Producer: Ben Glatzer

Cartman chronology
Nobody (2000)	Go! (2002)	George (2002)

Go! is the debut album by Australian pop rockers, Cartman, which was released on 14 January 2002 via Embryo Records and distributed by MGM Distribution. Go! was selected as Triple J's Album of the Week.

Scott Nicholls designed and created its artwork. The East Perth train terminal was chosen as the location for the cover art's photo shoot, accompanied by a small library of additional band photos taken throughout the band's career.

The first track lifted from the album, "Shock", raced across the national airwaves and was selected as the eviction music for reality TV show, Big Brother. "Shock" spent 17 weeks in the Triple J Net 50 and was voted in the Triple J Hottest 100 songs for 2002.

It was followed by the country tinged break up song, "Got No Reason", which spent five weeks in the Triple J Net 50 and received significant airplay across the country, The third single lifted from the album was the pop rock ballad, "George", a Joe Hawkins/Cartman song. Rotation on Triple J and the commercial networks cemented the album as one of the best Australian releases for 2002.

== Reception ==
Jason MacNeil of AllMusic rated it at four-out-of-five stars and explained, "[it] has all of the highbrow pop qualities of fellow countrymen such as the Whitlams and Crowded House... [with] the ability to morph from a '90s rock arrangement to sounding like a '50s rock group." Oz Music Project's Richard Parapar compared their earlier extended plays and found "the newer tracks are certainly the heart and soul of this album. Capable of writing catchy songs with perfect pop harmonies Cartman show their class... While there are plenty of songs with catchy hooks and melodies there are also country/bluegrass influences."

The hEARd's reviewer gave it ten-out-of-ten and opined, "[it] extends on what they've been doing prior to this & leaves the band's fans with a lasting memory of how cool they are." They described each track, including the "Second in is the brilliantly energetic number 'Shock', which has a very cool aggressive quality & it's this track that most will probably identify the album with already & I'm guessing it's the band's most successful song airplay-wise to date, with good reason." While "Next in line is a simple acoustic sort of opening with a great piece of percussion called 'George'. The song overall is quite simple in itself & I reckon it's probably one of the tracks that many will love the most & may well be the most memorable of the whole album."

== Track listing ==
1. "If I" (Scott Joseph Hawkins) – 3:39
2. "Shock (Living Without You)" (Scot Campbell Nicholls) – 3:57
3. "George" (Hawkins) – 4:12
4. "Nobody" (Hawkins) – 3:42
5. "Got No Reason" (Hawkins) – 3:01
6. "Drive" (Nicholls, Cain Simon Turnley, Hawkins) – 3:26
7. "(Song For) Absent Friends" (Turnley) – 3:15
8. "Marriage" (Turnley) – 4:02
9. "One You're Without" (Hawkins, Nicholls, Turnley) – 3:38
10. "Today" (Hawkins) – 4:09
11. "Go" (Turnley, Nicholls, Hawkins) – 5:55
12. "Toone (She Was Right)" (Turnley) – 9:46

Song writing credits:

== Personnel ==
- Joe Hawkins – lead vocals, electric bass, acoustic guitar
- Ben Mills – drums, percussion
- Scott Nicholls – acoustic guitar, electric Guitar
- Cain Turnley – vocals, bass guitar, electric guitar, acoustic guitar

Recording details

- Ben Glatzer – producer at Revolver Studios, Perth

Artwork

- Scott Nicholls – cover art
