= George (EP) =

EP by Cartman
- Released: October 7, 2002
- Recorded: Revolver Studios
- Genre: Alternative rock
- Length: 32:59
- Label: Embryo Records
- Producer: Ben Glatzer

Cartman chronology
Go! (2002)	George (2002)

George is the third EP by Cartman. It was released October 7, 2002, by Embryo Records and distributed by MGM Distribution. The album contains a rendition of the Madonna hit "Justify My Love", as well as the videos for "Shock", "If I" and "Nobody".

== Track listing ==
1. "George" - 4:14
2. "Justify My Love" - 4:14
3. "Monday Afternoon" - 4:06
4. "Go!" Remix - 6:57
5. Video Clips - 13:24

== Personnel ==
- Cain Turnley
- Joe Hawkins
- Scott Nicholls
- Ben Mills
