= Daisy Daze =

EP by Spencer Tracy
- Released: October 2001
- Genre: Rock
- Label: Rocket Records

Spencer Tracy chronology
Corner of My Eye (2001)	Daisy Daze (2001)	Hold On (2003)

Daisy Daze is the second EP released by Spencer Tracy.

== Track listing ==
All tracks written by Lee Jones unless otherwise noted.

1. "Daisy Daze"
2. "Stupid"
3. "Up in Arms"
4. "Opportunity"
5. "Baby Won't You Come"

== Personnel ==
=== Spencer Tracy ===
- Lee Jones - Guitars, Vocals & Piano
- John Rabjones - Guitars & Vocals
- Kim Jones - Bass Guitar
- Shaun Sibbes - Drums & Vocals
