= Corner of My Eye =

EP by Spencer Tracy
- Released: March 2001
- Genre: Rock
- Label: Rocket Records

Spencer Tracy chronology
Corner of My Eye (2001)	Daisy Daze (2001)

Corner of My Eye is the debut EP released by Spencer Tracy in March 2001 by Rocket Records.

The EP reached number 14 on the AIR Top20 Singles Charts. "Corner of My Eye" received airplay on Triple J and RTRFM which led to the band undertaking several tours of the east coast of Australia and supporting Echo and the Bunnymen, The Fauves, iOTA, Lo-Tel and Midnight Oil. "Corner of My Eye" was also featured on the Kiss My WAMI 2001 compilation album.

== Track listing ==
All tracks written by Lee Jones unless otherwise noted.

No.	Title	Length
1.	"Corner of My Eye"	4:00
2.	"Battle of the Egos"	2:38
3.	"Jabiluka"	3:26
4.	"Fight"	2:36
5.	"Corner of My Eye (Radio Edit)"	3:52

== Personnel ==
=== Spencer Tracy ===
- Lee Jones - guitar, vocals, piano
- John Rabjones - guitar, vocals
- Kim Jones - bass guitar
- Shaun Sibbes - drums, vocals
