= Heads Up (The Stems album) =

Studio album by The Stems
- Released: 6 October 2007
- Recorded: Kingdom Studios, Perth
- Genre: Alternative rock
- Length: 41:33
- Label: Mushroom Records
- Producer: Dom Monteleone; The Stems

The Stems chronology
Terminal Cool (2006)	Heads Up (2007)	Evergreen Scene - The Stems Anthology 1983-87 (2007)

Professional ratings
Review scores
Source	Rating
Beat Magazine (November 7, 2007)	(not rated)

Heads Up is the second studio album from Australian alternative group, The Stems, released on 6 October 2007 through Shock Records. The album was recorded at Kingdom Studios, Perth, mixed at Ultrasuede Studio Inc, Cincinnati, Ohio by producer John Curley (The White Stripes, The Afghan Whigs, The Greenhornes, Ronnie Spector) and mastered at Oceanway, Los Angeles, California by Alan Yoshida.

== Track listing ==
All tracks written by Dom Mariani, unless otherwise noted.

1. "Leave You Way Behind" - 3:45
2. "She Sees Everything" - 4:39
3. "Surround Me" (Dave Shaw) - 4:11
4. "Undying Love" - 4:16
5. "What's Your Stand" (Richard Lane, Glenn Morris) - 3:37
6. "Hellbound Train" - 3:47
7. "Get To Know Me" - 4:20
8. "Only If You Want It" (Richard Lane, Glenn Morris) - 3:54
9. "Liar" (Dave Shaw) - 4:06
10. "Get So Bad" - 3:57

== Personnel ==
=== The Stems ===
- Dom Mariani - guitar, lead vocals, percussion
- Julian Matthews - bass, vocals
- Richard Lane - guitar, vocals, combo organ, harmonica
- Dave Shaw - drums, vocals, percussion

=== Additional musicians ===
- Ashley Naylor - vocals ("Undying Love", "Surround Me" & "What's Your Stand")
- Lasse Bjorn - handclaps
