= At First Sight, Violets Are Blue =

Studio album by The Stems
- Released: August 1987; 23 March 2003
- Recorded: Planet Studios, Perth
- Genre: Alternative rock
- Length: 41:33
- Label: White/Mushroom
- Producer: Guy Gray, Alan Thorne, Dom Mariani

The Stems chronology
| Love Will Grow – Rosebud Volume 1 (1986) | At First Sight, Violets Are Blue (1987) | The Great Rosebud Hoax (1987) |

Professional ratings
Review scores
| Source | Rating |
|---|---|
| AllMusic | 3.5/5 stars |

At First Sight, Violets Are Blue is the debut studio album by Australian alternative rock group, The Stems, released in August 1987 through Mushroom Records' White Label on vinyl. The title track "At First Sight" gained mainstream airplay and a position on the Young Einstein sound track. "At First Sight" became the band's signature track and the album is still rated as one of the best Australian guitar pop releases. In the early nineties Rolling Stone included it in the top 100 Australian releases of all time.

The album was re-issued by Mushroom Records on 23 March 2003 and included a bonus disc with 14 additional tracks.

In 2007 the album was certified gold (with sales of over 35,000 units).

== Track listing ==
=== Original release ===
1. "At First Sight" 4:02
2. "Sad Girl" 3:20
3. "Rosebud" 3:38
4. "Man with the Golden Heart" 4:04
5. "Running Around" 3:30
6. "For Always" 3:06
7. "You Can't Turn the Clock Back" 3:15
8. "Move Me" 3:26
9. "Mr Misery" 3:37
10. "Can't Forget That Girl" 3:23
11. "Never Be Friends" 2:54
12. "Otherside" 3:12

=== Re-issue bonus disc ===
1. "Sad Girl" (Single version) (Dom Mariani) 3:35
2. "Grooviest Girl in Town" (B-side of 'At First Sight' single) (J Matthews/D Mariani) 4:39
3. "My Beach" (B-side of 'Sad Girl' single) (D Shaw/J Matthews/D Mariani) 3:26
4. "Can't Forget That Girl" (Original demo, previously unreleased) (D Mariani) 3:18
5. "Rosebud" (Live*) (R Lane/J Matthews) 4:03
6. "Make You Mine" (Live*) (D Mariani) 6:28
7. "Mr Misery" (Live*) (D Mariani) 3:21
8. "Under Your Mushroom" (Live*) (R Lane/J Matthews) 2:44
9. "She's A Monster" (Live*) (D Mariani) 3:41
10. "Love Will Grow" (Live*) (D Mariani) 3:17
11. "Otherside" (Live*) (R Lane) 3:02
12. "Does It Turn You On" (Live*) (D Mariani) 4:37
13. "All You Want For Me" (Live*) (J Matthews) 2:24
14. "Stepping Stone" (Live*) (Boyce/Hart) 2:58

*Live at the Old Melbourne Hotel (Perth, Western Australia), 18 April 1986.

== Charts ==
| Chart (1987) | Peak position |
|---|---|
| Australia (Kent Music Report) | 34 |
