= Drugs (Ammonia song) =

Single by Ammonia

from the album Mint 400
- Released: 1995
- Genre: Grunge/Rock
- Length: 3:27
- Label: Murmur
- Songwriter(s): Allan Balmont, Simon Hensworth, Dave Johnstone
- Producer(s): Kevin Shirley

Ammonia singles chronology
"Drugs" (1995)	"Ken Carter" (1996)

"Drugs" is a song by Ammonia, released as their debut single from their debut album Mint 400 in 1995. The song was an instant hit and is still regarded as one of the band's most recognised songs.

Lead singer Dave Johnstone is quoted as saying, "There isn't really that much of a message. 'Drugs' is about apathy towards drugs." The song was written in five minutes during a rehearsal and peaked at #32 on the Australian Singles chart and came in at #27 on Triple J’s Hottest 100 for 1995. In North America, it reached #29 on the Billboard's Hot Modern Rock Tracks and #22 on the Canadian rock/alternative chart.

== Formats & track listings ==
- AUS CD single MATTCD022
  1. "Drugs" – 3:27
  2. "Realise" – 3:18
  3. "Zoned" – 3:59
- AUS promo CD single SAMPCD 3367
  1. "Drugs" – 3:27
- US promo CD single ESK 7681
  1. "Drugs" – 3:27

== Charts ==
Chart (1995)	Peak position
Australia (ARIA)	32
