= Ben Glatzer =

Australian sound engineer and producer (born 1959)

- Born: Ben-Zion Glatzer; 8 October 1959 (age 66); Subiaco, Western Australia, Australia
- Occupations: Sound engineer, record producer, drummer
- Years active: 1977–2006
- Labels: Embryo, Citadel, Murmur

Ben-Zion "Ben" Glatzer (born 8 October 1959, Perth) is an Australian sound engineer and producer. He worked on Ammonia's debut album, Mint 400 (1995), The Chevelles' At Second Glance (1995), Cartman's debut Go! (2002), The Stems' Mushroom Soup: The Citadel Years (2003), and The Sleepy Jackson's debut Lovers (2003). From 1994 to 2002 Glatzer won a total of eight West Australian Music Industry Awards for his work.

== Biography ==
Ben-Zion Glatzer was born on 8 October 1959 in Subiaco. He grew up with his father, Willy (Bill) Glatzer (born 19 December 1927, Poland), a Holocaust survivor and furniture business operator, his mother, Leah Freidman, and his older sister, Hanya Glatzer (later Moschner). Glatzer grew up in the northern suburbs of Perth, he attended Carmel Primary School and Mount Lawley High School. After graduating in 1976 he was accepted into the Western Australian College of Advanced Education (WACAE), where he followed Hanya into an education course. By 1977 he obtained a deferral from further studies and became a factory hand in his family's business.

In April 1977 Glatzer began pursuing a career in music initially as a drummer and as a technical sound engineer. Glatzer's early work was as a live audio engineer for various musical artists including local, interstate and international acts. In 1979 he founded a related sound system and truck hire company, Glatzer Concert Tours. In 1990 he worked at Pet Rock Studios as a record producer and engineer.

In April 1991 Glatzer established the Revolver Sound Studio, where he remained the manager, principal audio engineer and record producer until his partial retirement in May 2006. In mid-2002, Glatzer began production for the rock group, Spencer Tracy's debut self-titled album. Glatzer urged their lead guitarist and vocalist, Lee Jones, to continue his career in rock music when Jones was tempted by an offer to become a classical music pianist. Jones remained with the band and the album was issued in 2003 on Embryo Records.

== Personal life ==
Ben Glatzer's son Jason Glatzer is a musician who, in 2002, formed a school band which became the Perth-based pop rock group Amberdown. By mid-2011 they were recording a five-track EP with the senior Glatzer producing.

=== Career summary ===
- April 1977 – May 1992: Various Musical Groups – Live audio engineer. Engineered for many local, interstate and international artists.
- 1979–1987: Owned and operated a medium-sized concert sound system and truck hire company: Glatzer Concert Tours.
- February 1990 – May 1991: Petrock Studios – Recording Audio Engineer/Producer
- April 1991 – May 2006: Revolver Sound Studio – Recording Audio Engineer/Producer/Manager

== Discography ==
Ben Glatzer has been credited as producer, mixing engineer, audio engineer, or remixer:

- Ammonia – Mint 400 (1995) – producer
- The Chevelles – At Second Glance (1995) – mixing & audio engineer
- DM3 – Something Heavy (Citadel Records EP, 1995) Road to Rome (Citadel Records, 1996)
- Thumb – Thumb (EP, 1995)
- Sugarchild – Sugarchild (EP, 1997)
- Crawlspace – Afraid (EP, 1998), Motion (1999)
- Wax Tadpole – Proxy by Proxy (EP, 1998)
- Cartman – I'm Not a Policeman (EP, 1999), Nobody (EP, 2000), Go! (2002), George (EP, 2002) – mixing & audio engineer, producer
- Beaverloop – Resistance Is Useful (Murmur Records, 1999)
- Flavour of the Month – Fear of Falling (2000) – audio engineer & co-producer
- The Stems – Mushroom Soup: The Citadel Years (2003) – remixing
- The Sleepy Jackson – Lovers (2003) – audio engineer
- Spencer Tracy – Spencer Tracy (2003)
- Mr Sandman – Highway Love (EP, 2003)
- Showbag – Town We Loved In (2004) – audio engineer

== Awards and nominations ==
=== WAMI Awards ===
The West Australian Music Industry Awards (WAMIs) are annual awards presented to the local contemporary music industry, put on by the Western Australian Music Industry Association Inc. Glatzer won a total of eight WAMIs for his work.

Year	Nominee / work	Award	Result
1992	Ben Glatzer	Best Live Sound Engineer	Nominated
1993	"Foolish" – DM3	Best Single	Won
1993	Ben Glatzer	Best Sound Recording Engineer	Nominated
1994	Ben Glatzer	Best Sound Recording Engineer	Won
1995	Ben Glatzer	Best Sound Recording Engineer	Nominated
1996	Ben Glatzer	Best Sound Recording Engineer	Nominated
1997	Ben Glatzer	Best Sound Recording Engineer	Won
1997	Ben Glatzer	Best Record Producer	Nominated
1998	Ben Glatzer	Best Sound Recording Engineer	Nominated
1998	Ben Glatzer	Best Record Producer	Nominated
1999	Ben Glatzer	Best Sound Recording Engineer	Won
1999	Ben Glatzer	Best Record Producer	Won
2000	Ben Glatzer	Best Sound Recording Engineer	Nominated
2000	Ben Glatzer	Best Record Producer	Won
2001	Ben Glatzer	Best Sound Recording Engineer	Won
2001	Ben Glatzer	Best Record Producer	Won
2002	Ben Glatzer	Best Sound Recording Engineer	Nominated
2002	Ben Glatzer	Best Record Producer	Nominated
2003	Ben Glatzer	Best Sound Recording Engineer	Nominated
2003	Ben Glatzer	Best Record Producer	Nominated

=== Other awards ===
- 1999 Nominated Best independent release for Crawlspace's "Away" ARIA Music Awards.
- 2002 Won Simon McCarthy – "Libertine", Nominated USA Song writing Competition in the Pop & Rock category.
