= Love Will Grow – Rosebud Volume 1 =

Love Will Grow - Rosebud Volume 1

EP by The Stems
- Released: February 1986
- Genre: Alternative rock
- Label: Citadel Records
- Producer: Rob Younger; Alan Thorne

The Stems chronology
Love Will Grow - Rosebud Volume 1 (1986)	At First Sight, Violets Are Blue (1987)

Love Will Grow – Rosebud Volume 1 is the debut extended play by Australian alternative rock group, The Stems. It was produced by Rob Younger, vocalist of Radio Birdman, and Alan Thorne (Hoodoo Gurus, The Screaming Tribesmen, Paul Kelly and the Coloured Girls). The EP was released in February 1986 through Citadel Records, the EP has never been released on a CD format. The EP reached No. 72 on the Australian Kent Music Report Singles Chart.

== Track listing ==
1. "Love Will Grow"
2. "Under Your Mushroom"
3. "Just Ain't Enough"
4. "Jumping to Conclusions"

== Charts ==
Chart (1986)	Peak position
Australia (Kent Music Report)	72
