= Dom Mariani =

Australian musician (born 1958)

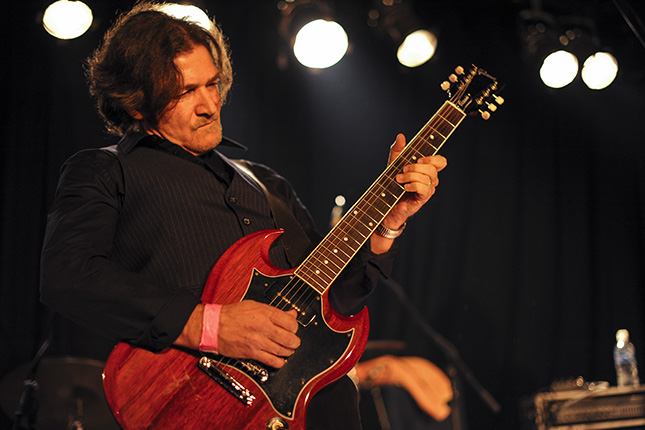
- Mariani on guitar with Fighter Plane at the WAMi Awards, Northbridge in June 2012

Background information
- Born: Domenic Desio Mariani; 27 July 1958 (age 68); Fremantle, Western Australia, Australia
- Genres: Garage rock, power pop, alternative rock, rock
- Occupations: Musician, producer, architectural designer
- Instruments: Vocals, guitar
- Years active: 1972–present
- Labels: Citadel, White, Mushroom, Shock, Bomp!, Head, Off the Hip, Butterfly
- Website: www.dommariani.com

Dom Mariani is an Australian guitarist, vocalist and songwriter. Mariani has been a member of several bands since the early 1980s, including The Stems, The Someloves, DM3, Datura4 and instrumental side project The Majestic Kelp. The Stems is the best-known and most successful of Mariani's projects. Australian musicologist Ian McFarlane described the power pop group as "one of the best live bands on the Australian scene".

In 2005 Mariani was inducted into the West Australian Music Industry Awards Hall of Fame. In August of that year he curated a double-CD compilation album, Popsided Guitar: Anthology 1984–2004, which included material from several of his bands. In 2007 United States writer John M. Borack rated Mariani as "one of the top five pop titans of the past couple of decades".

== Biography ==
Mariani grew up in Fremantle, Western Australia. Mariani is the son of Italian migrants from Abruzzo,

=== The Stems (1983–1987, 2003–2009) ===
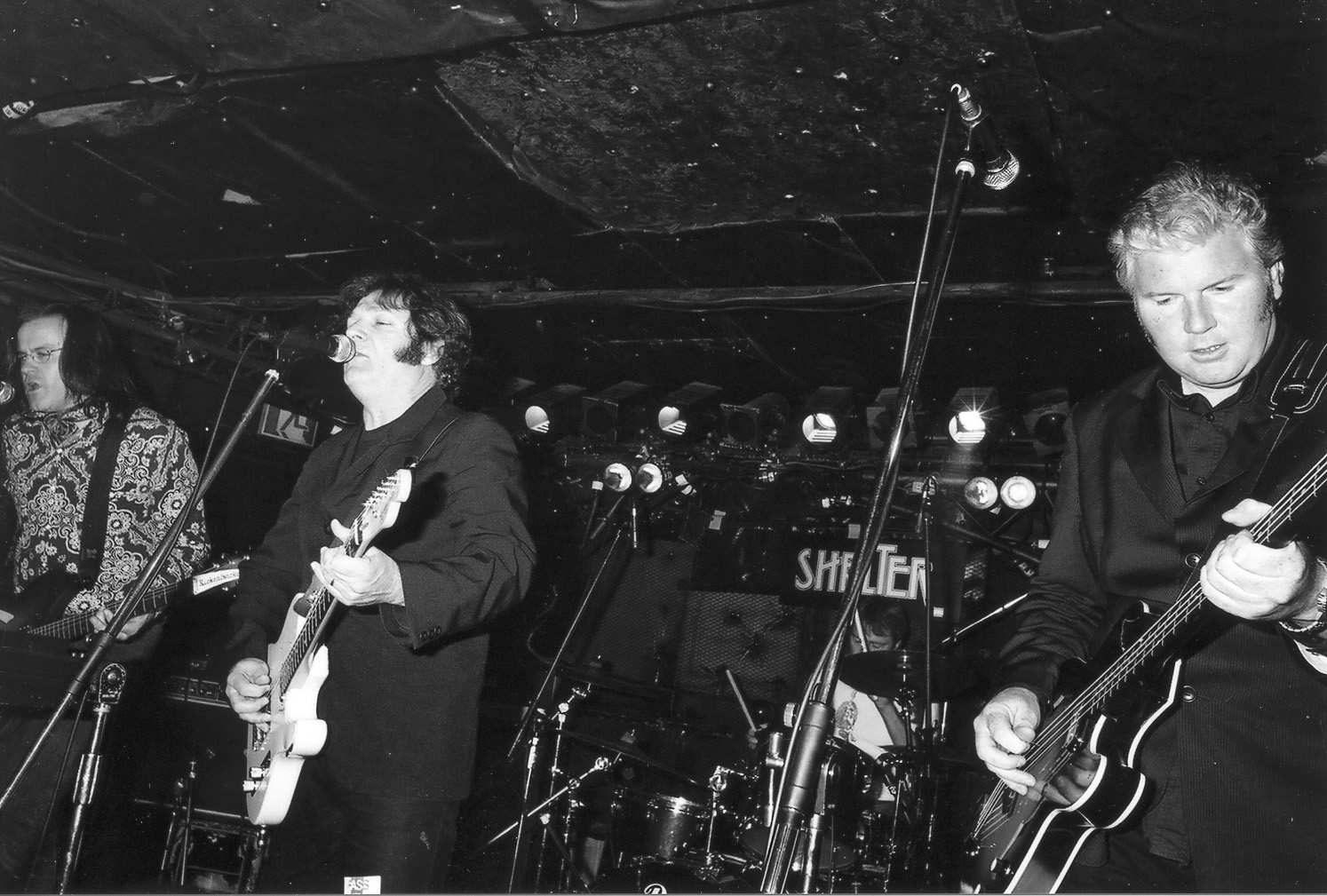
Mariani (second from left) performing with The Stems Tokyo, Japan, January 2008

The Stems formed in late 1983 with Dom Mariani on guitar and vocals, Gary Chambers on drums, Richard Lane on keyboards, guitar and vocals, and John Shuttleworth on bass guitar. The power pop band's repertoire was mostly original material predominately written by Mariani in the style of "1960s pop/R&B/garage bands", with a few cover versions included. In March 1984 they played their debut gig supporting The Saints and The Triffids in Perth. The Stems built up a substantial local following. In June 1984 Shuttleworth was replaced by Julian Matthews on bass guitar.

In early 1985 the group travelled to Sydney, home of their label Citadel Records, and promoted their first single, "Make You Mine" (May). The track, written by Mariani, reached the top of the independent charts and sold 5000 copies in Australia. "Make You Mine" was the second highest selling independent single in Australia for the year. During this period they recorded their second single, "Tears Me in Two", and an extended play, Love Will Grow (February 1986), both produced by Rob Younger and Alan Thorne. The EP reached No. 72 on the Australian Kent Music Report Singles Chart. Australian musicologist, Ian McFarlane, described The Stems' early work as "classic slices of exuberant, simplistic garage-fuzz pop".

In December 1985 David Shaw replaced Chambers on drums. The group spent most of 1986 touring Australia. They signed with Mushroom Records' subsidiary label White Records and started recording their debut studio album, At First Sight, Violets Are Blue, with Thorne producing. However, the sessions were disrupted and Mariani took on production duties with Guy Gray. The album was released in May 1987 and became the third-highest selling independent album in Australia for that year. The Stems embarked on another national tour, with appearances on national TV. The lead single, "At First Sight" (February), appeared on the soundtrack of the movie Young Einstein in December 1988. Mariani wrote the track and its follow up singles, "For Always" (May 1987) and "Sad Girl" (September). "Sad Girl" was premiered in a performance on TV pop show Countdown on 12 July 1987 – the show's second-last episode, which was co-hosted by Kylie Minogue and Mike Hammond.

On 31 August 1987 The Stems played what turned out to be their last gig. In October of that year, a proposed six-week European tour was cancelled and the group disbanded. McFarlane wrote; "by that time they had developed into one of the best live bands on the Australian scene". In October 2009 Mariani told The Age's Michael Dwyer, "we were on the charts, getting airplay, very popular. But within the band there was a bit of burnout ... you have these moments where you can't stop thinking negatively and I kept picturing myself pushing a van in the snow. I thought, 'I don't want to be doing that. I'm getting out of here'". The Huffington Post's Holly Cara Price described the group as "one of the most tuneful and tasty garage rock bands of the era. Avid fans of pop, R&B and 60's garage punk, their predilection translated to great punchy songs".

The Stems line-up of Mariani, Lane, Matthews and Shaw played a reunion gig in Fremantle in late February 1997. Adam Connors for The Australian recalled that; "since the disbandment their simple yet unassailable songsmithery endeared them to a huge European music public and propelled them on to play the final Countdown". At the reunion he noted Shaw's drumming was "fluid and driving", Mathews played "his bass like he was oiling a bat", while Mariani and Lane showcased their "fuzzed-out appliances and Beach Boys bah bah bahs".

In 2002 Off the Hip Records issued The Great Stems Hoax – A Tribute to The Stems, which had 19 cover versions of Stems songs performed by various artists. The Age's Patrick Donovan noted the album "highlighted the band's continuing influence" as the contributors were from Australia, Europe and the U.S.A.

In March 2003 The Stems the line-up of Mariani, Chambers, Lane and Matthews reformed for a national tour. They performed periodically over subsequent years making regular treks to both Europe, America and the east coast of Australia. In 2007 they released their second studio album, Heads Up on Shock Records. The Barman at the I-94 Bar website wrote that the work was "accomplished and focussed" and displayed a "heavier, more aggressive edge, plus the odd dark moment, lyrically". The group disbanded again in October 2009.

In April 2013 The Stems reformed (with Shaw on drums and Ashley Naylor replacing Lane) for performances at the prestigious Dig It Up! festivals which, curated by the Hoodoo Gurus, is a traveling roadshow featuring classic power pop and garage bands. In March 2014 they played shows in Melbourne, Brisbane and Sydney.

=== Side projects (1986–1991) ===
During his time in The Stems, Dom Mariani undertook a number of side-projects. One of these, The Stonefish, was an instrumental surf rock group formed in February 1986, which reunited him with Hitchcock (now on guitar and dobro) and Zupanovich, alongside his Stems' cohort Dave Shaw. In March the following year they issued a four-track 12" EP, From 20,000 Fathoms, on Citadel Records. The EP included material written and performed by Mariani's earlier instrumental group, The Go-Starts. However, The Stonefish had disbanded by the time the record was released.

Early in 1986 Dom Mariani formed another alternative rock/power pop band, The Someloves, with Darryl Mather of Lime Spiders on guitar. The Stems' former drummer Gary Chambers soon joined and together with Christian Houllemare (ex-Happy Hate Me Nots) on bass guitar and vocals, The Someloves recorded their debut single, "It's My Time", which was released in June. Late in 1987 he resumed The Someloves with Mather and in September 1988 they issued a second single, "Know You Now". By 1989 the pair were joined by Zupanovich, Martin Moon (ex-Marigolds) on drums and Tony Italiano on bass guitar.

In May 1990 The Someloves issued their debut album, Something or Other, which was produced by Mariani and Mather with Mitch Easter and John Villani. The album appeared on the ARIA Albums Chart Top 100 and provided a single, "Melt" (April 1990), and an EP, Sunshine's Glove (August). McFarlane felt Something or Other was "full of shimmering power pop melodies and glittering guitar sounds". The album and the band won West Australian Music Industry Awards that year. Various personal issues and problems with the idea of touring led to the group disbanding by the end of the year.

In mid-1986 Mariani briefly joined The Summer Suns, which played a blend of 1960s folk rock and 1970s power pop with an emphasis on melody. The band was formed by Kim Williams (ex-Louie Louie, Holy Rollers) on lead vocals, guitar and bass guitar, and had a variable line-up that included Mariani, Chambers and Zapunovich as well as other Perth musicians. In October they issued a debut single, "Rachel Anne", on Williams's own label, Easter Records. Mariani left for other commitments but returned in 1989 for a new line-up of The Summer Suns with Williams now joined by Moon and Steve Kind on bass guitar. They issued a second single, "All Away", in September before Mariani moved on again.

Although The Someloves' Mather was not interested in touring or even performing live, the other members created Dom Mariani's Orange with the line-up of Mariani, Moon, Italiano and Zupanovich to showcase the album. They also recorded a track, "Christ-masonic", for a various artists' compilation, Rockin' Bethlehem: The Second Coming (1990). In 1998 Mariani described how Orange developed, "The Someloves was a loose studio idea ... I was hanging out to play live again but Darryl wasn't into it ... the record company were also putting the pressure on us to go on the road ... The album had been well received, so it was a real shame we couldn't go on with it. So it became Orange". Orange performed The Someloves' and some new material but by mid-1991 Orange had also disbanded. In 2006, Half A Cow records issued "Don't Talk About Us: The Real Pop Recordings of the Someloves 1985–89" which collected together every official recording The Someloves made.

=== DM3 (1992–1999) ===
In late 1992 Dom Mariani formed DM3 with Toni Italiano on bass and Pascal Bartolone (ex-The Summer Suns) on drums. Initially, Ian Campbell was an auxiliary member on lead guitar. In May they issued their first single, "Foolish", and followed in September with they eponymous debut album, One Times, Two Times, Three Red Light, on Citadel Records. The album was produced by the band's members. In 1993 Mariani was inducted into the WAMIA ‘Rock ‘n’ Roll of Renown’. In mid-1994 DM3 undertook a European tour in support of these releases, one of their appearances was on 1 July in Denmark at the Roskilde Festival. That performance was recorded and released in May 2013 as Live (Roskilde Festival 1994). In June 1996 DM3's second album, Road to Rome, appeared. It was produced by the band with Mich Easter.

US writer, John M. Borack, rated the album at No. 11 in his list of The 200 Greatest Power Pop Albums, as it demonstrated "a sublime concoction of equal parts '90s pop power and '60s melodicism" with tracks full of "meaty, beaty, big and ballsy guitar riffs living in a state of sheer bliss with non-cliched lyrics". An EP, 5 Greasy Pieces, was released that same year, while a compilation of b-sides and out takes, Garage Sale, was issued the following year. US label Bomp! Records also issued a compilation, Dig It the Most, in support of the band's 1997 tour. That year Italiano left and was replaced by ex-The Stems, bass guitarist, Matthews. DM Three's third album, Rippled Soul, appeared in September 1998. In 1999 Jeff Baker joined on guitar but the group disbanded later that year. Price declared that DM3 could "arguably be called the best power pop band ever to come out of Australia".

=== 21st Century music (2002–present) ===
In 2002 Dom Mariani replaced Danny McDonald in power pop group, The Stoneage Hearts. The group began with McDonald on lead vocals and guitar (P76, Jericho), Mickster Baty on drums (Finkers, Crusaders, Pyramidiacs), and Ian Wettenhall on bass guitar and vocals (The Philisteins, Seminal Rats, Hands of Time, Freeloaders). They had released a debut album, Turn On, and McDonald left to pursue a solo career. With Mariani aboard, the new line-up recorded their next album, Guilty as Sin (2004), for Off the Hip Records. It was also released in the US on the Bomp! Records subsidiary, Alive Records, on green vinyl LP and CD. Mariani left soon after.

Dom Mariani & the Majestic Kelp were formed as an instrumental group in 2003. Mariani reunited with former Go-Starts drummer Robbie Scorer, and new associates Killian Albrecht on guitar and Stu Loasby on bass guitar. Price described their sound as "cool surf guitar/postmodern lounge instrumental". They released their debut album, Underwater Casino in July. In 2005 Mariani was inducted into the WAMIA Hall of Fame. In August that year he curated a 2× CD compilation album, Popsided Guitar: Anthology 1984–2004, which featured material from The Stems, The Someloves, DM3, The Stoneage Hearts and The Majestic Kelp. The cover depicts Mariani holding his Rickenbacker 330 Fireglo six-string guitar, which he used for The Stems and DM3. Mariani put together a new line-up to promote the retrospective under the banner of Dom Mariani & The Rippled Souls. Featuring Kelp cohort Stu Loasby on bass, Kevin Borruso on guitar and Shaun Sibbes on drums. The newly christened 4 piece toured throughout Europe and Japan in early 2006 as well as a successful eastern states tour. The Rippled Souls also opened for John Fogerty and Teenage Fanclub. Following on from the tour, The Majestic Kelp's second album, Music to Chase Cars By, was recorded in Perth and mixed in San Diego by Mark Neill (The Black Keys, The Palominos, Old 97's) at Soil of the South Studios and issued in 2006. The group's line-up was expanded with the addition of two new members, Toby Gosfield on keyboards and Billy Rogers on saxophone.

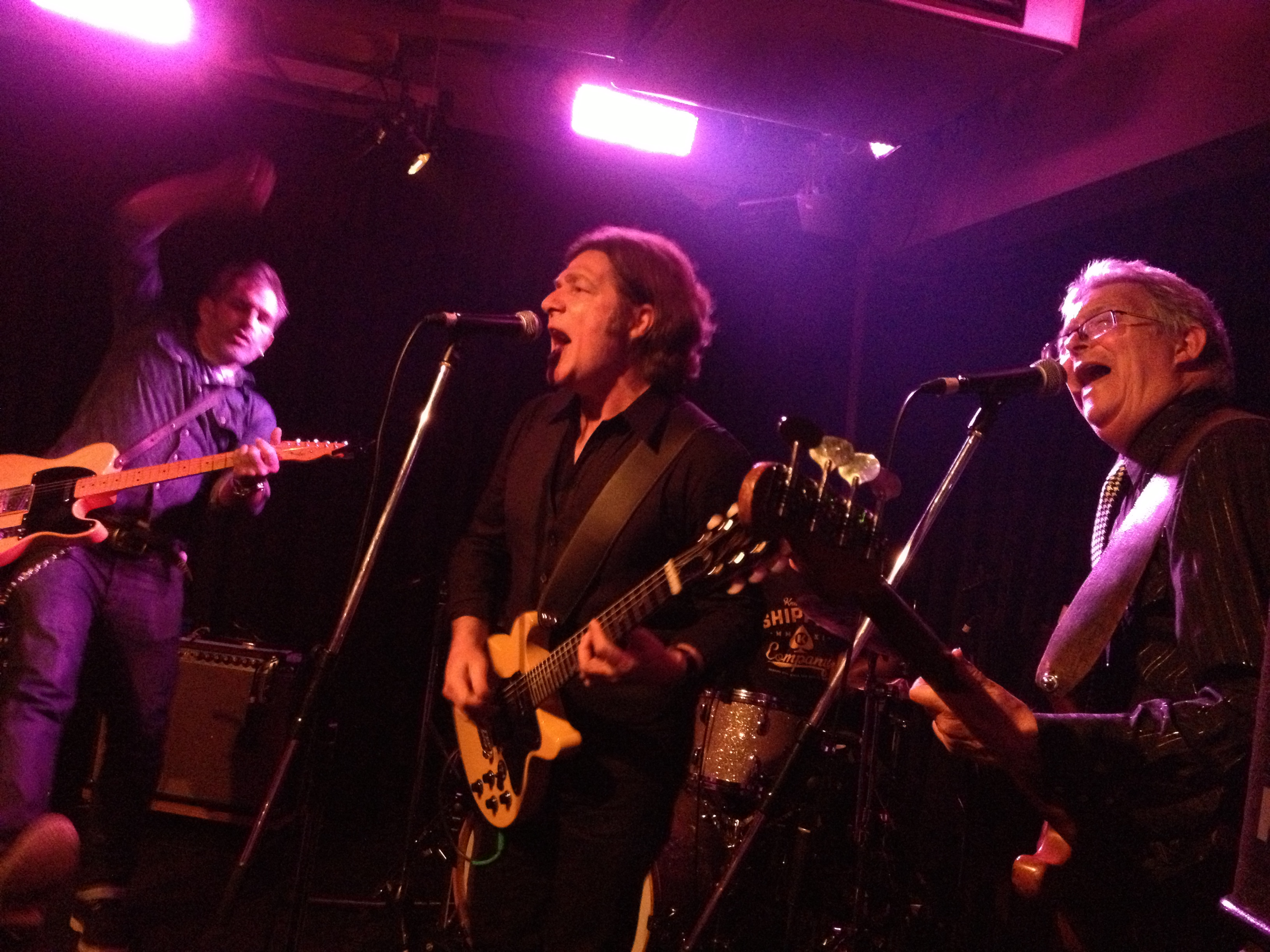
The DomNicks featuring Mariani (centre) and Nick Sheppard (The Cortinas, The Clash), performing in November 2012.

In 2007 Mariani formed The DomNicks with Nick Sheppard (The Cortinas, The Clash), together with bass guitarist, Howard Shawcross (The Elks) and drummer Marz Frisina (The Chevelles). They play a mix of Mariani and Sheppard originals with a spread of 1960s and 1970s garage rock and soul material. Also that year Borack rated Mariani as "one of the top five pop titans of the past couple of decades". In September 2008 Mariani appeared on celebrity music trivia TV show, RocKwiz, including performing a duet, "Sinister Purpose", with Abbe May. In 2009 The DomNicks released an EP, Hey Rock 'n' Roller, which was produced by Wayne Connolly (The Vines, You Am I). The DomNicks toured supporting Hoodoo Gurus and in September 2010 they performed in Sydney and Melbourne at the Joe Strummer tribute concerts, 'Revolution Rock'.

In 2008 Mariani decided it was time to get back to the music that fired him up as a youngster and form the heavy boogie blues combo Datura. Datura consists of Greg Hitchcock on guitar and vocals, Stu Loasby on bass and Warren Hall on drums. Musically indebted to '70's hard rock, Datura often perform improvised sets with a loose rock'n'roll feel. Their debut album is expected by late 2014.

In 2011 Mariani reactivated DM3. They toured extensively overseas as well as dates throughout Australia. On 21 September 2012 The DomNicks issued their debut album, Super Real, which Mess+Noise described as "power-pop with soul" and "comprises predominantly Sheppard's originals, punctuated with a couple of Mariani's tracks and the odd cover". The Barman finds the two leaders are "great foils; Mariani with his classic '60s pop stylings and Sheppard with his gritty blues and old style rocker-cum-roller touches. Toss in a shared love for soul, probably a dash of competitive tension, and you have a recipe for a classic". The following month the group played at the 30th anniversary of Citadel Records; also at the celebration were Penny Ikinger (ex-Sacred Cowboys) and Deniz Tek (Radio Birdman) both on guitars. In March 2013 The DomNicks appeared at the West Coast Blues & Roots Festival.

In June 2013 DM3 toured Italy, France and Spain, including a performance at 6th Annual Andoaingo Rock Festival.

In August 2013 the Majestic Kelp released their third album, Turn Up the Sun. The album received positive reviews prompting the April 2014 release of Turn Up The Sun on vinyl through Head Records

== Personal life ==
Aside from performing music Dom Mariani's main occupation is as an architectural designer, with his own firm, Dom Mariani Designs. He also works as a producer for local, interstate and overseas acts. According to Mariani; "the business allows me the flexibility to do this music ... I still love it and I'm still writing a lot and recording". By 1990 Mariani was married to Angelina and the couple had started a family. As from November 2011 their daughter Ruby Mariani is a fashion designer and one half of a DJ duo, The Gruesome Twosome. As of June 2013 Angelina runs a biscotti bakery in South Fremantle – formerly her parents family home. The Mariani's son, John Mariani, and nephew, Dion Mariani, formed a garage rock band, The Flairz, in 2003 – the band members' average age was ten-and-a-half years-old. On 3 November 2007 The Flairz supported The Stems' Heads Up Tour for a late afternoon gig, later that night they were supported by The Gruesome Twosome. Mariani's brother, Laurie, who has archived some of the early The Stems memorabilia, runs a theatrical supply business.

== Discography ==
Dom Mariani is credited with various musical work: guitars (lead, 12-string), vocals, bass guitar, composer, producer, audio mixer, audio engineer, remix engineer.

=== Albums ===
The Go-Starts

- The Go-Starts (cassette) – Independent (1983)

The Stems

- At First Sight, Violets Are Blue – White Label / Mushroom Records (1987, 2003)
- Heads Up – Shock records (2007)

The Someloves

- Something or Other – White Label (Mushroom Records) (1990)
- Don't Talk About Us: The Real Pop Recordings of the Someloves 1985–89 – Half A Cow (July 2006)

DM3

- One Time Two Times Three Red Light – Citadel Records (CITCD530) (August 1993); Running Circle (1995) (different cover, different track listing, extra tracks: "High Rotations", "Up in the Air (coffee house mix)")
- Road to Rome – Citadel Records (CITCD532) (March 1996) (first pressing came with bonus disc: 5 Greasy Pieces); Running Circle (1996) (different cover) In some markets, 5 Greasy Pieces, was issued as a separate EP.
- Garage Sale – Citadel Records (CITCD533) (April 1997)
- Dig It the Most – Bomp! Records (1997)
- Rippled Soul – Citadel Records (CITCD542) (August 1998)
- Garage Sale Vol. 2 Italian Style – Citadel Records (April 2003)
- Live (Roskilde Festival 1994) – Citadel Records (30 May 2013)

Dom Mariani and The Majestic Kelp

- Underwater Casino – Head Records (HEAD040) (May 2003)
- Music to Chase Cars By – Head Records (HEAD073) (September 2006)
- Turn Up the Sun – Head Records (4 August 2013)

The Stoneage Hearts

- Turn On – Off the Hip Records (2002)
- Guilty as Sin – Off the Hip (October 2004)

Dom Mariani (solo)

- Homespun Blues and Greens – Citadel Records (CITCD558) (June 2004)
- Popsided Guitar (Anthology 1984–2004) – Citadel Records (CITCD559) (8 August 2005)
- Shell Collection (Outtakes and Rarities) – Off the Hip/Liberation Blue (BLUE168.2) (24 April 2006)

The DomNicks

- Super Real – Citadel Records (CITCD566) (October 2012)

Datura4

- Demon Blues (2015)
- Hairy Mountain (2016)
- Blessed is the Boogie (2019)
- West Coast Highway Cosmic (2020)
- Neanderthal Jam (2022)
- Invisible Hits (2023)
- High On The Low Brow (2026)

=== Extended plays ===
The Stems

- Love Will Grow – Rosebud Volume 1 – Citadel Records (February 1986)

The Stonefish

- From 20,000 Fathoms – Citadel Records (March 1987)

The Someloves

- Sunshine's Glove – White Label (Mushroom Records) (1990)

DM3

- Glovebox – Citadel Records (1993)
- Something Heavy – Citadel Records (CITCD915) (September 1995)
- 5 Greasy Pieces – 123 Red Light (123RLEP001) (1996)
- Just Like Nancy – Citadel Records (1999); Hellfire Club Records (July 1999)

The DomNicks

- Hey Rock 'n' Rolla – Independent (2009)

=== Singles ===
The Stems

- "Make You Mine"/"She's a Monster" – Citadel Records (1985)
- "Tears Me in Two"/"Can't Resist" – Citadel Records (1985)
- "At First Sight"/"Grooviest Girl in Town" – (1987)
- "Sad Girl"/"My Beach" – (1987)
- "For Always"/"Mr Misery" – (1987)
- "Let Your Head Rest"/"Don't Let Me"/"Tears Me in Two" – (Zero Hour Records) (1993)

The Someloves

- "It's My Time"/"Don't Talk About Us" – Citadel Records (1986)
- "Know You Know"/"Don't Have to Try" – White Label / Mushroom Records (1988)
- "Melt"/"Jack Robinson" – White Label / Mushroom Records (1989)
- "Sunshine's Glove"/"Girl Soul" – White Label / Mushroom Records (1990)

DM3

- "Foolish"/"Oriana"/"High Rotations" – Citadel Records (CITCD052) (June 1993)
- "Far from Here"/"Take It All"/"1x2xDevastated" – Citadel Records (CITCD053) (1993); Screaming Apple Records (July 1994) (different track listing)
- "Soultop"/"TV Sound"/"Making Time" – Citadel Records (CITCD054) (December 1994)
- "Making Time" – Get Hip Records (1995)
- "Everything That You Told Me"/"Priest" – Munster Records (1996) (B-Side "Priest" is an exclusive track recorded live at ABC Studios in July 1993)
- "Lure"/"Rome"/"Jumping to Conclusions" – Citadel Records (CITCD058) (July 1998)
- "Snapshots" – Freshwater Records

The Stoneage Hearts

- "Stephanie"/"Looking Good"/"Little Too White" – Pop the Balloon (2002)
- "Suzie"/"Shoot My Mouth Off"/"The Bitter Thoughts of Little Jane" – Butterfly Records (2003)

Dom Mariani (solo)

- "Real Friend"/"Jenny" – Pop the Balloon (BANG 9) (2000)

== Notes ==
1. For details of Giovanni Mariani see National Archives of Australia, item No. K1331, 1957/MARIANI G, and Western Australian Museum Welcome Walls. For details of Giovanna Mariani see National Archives of Australia, item No. PP350/1, W1963/3649, and Western Australian Museum Welcome Walls. For details of Domenico Mariani see Western Australian Museum Welcome Walls.

== Awards ==
=== West Australian Music Industry Awards ===
The West Australian Music Industry Awards are annual awards celebrating achievements for Western Australian music. They commenced in 1985.

Year	Nominee / work	Award	Result
1993	Dom Mariani	Rock 'n' Roll of Renown	inductee
