= Cartman (band) =

Australian indie rock band

- Origin: Perth, Western Australia, Australia
- Genre: Alternative rock
- Years active: 1997–2003
- Labels: Phantom Records; Revolver Records
- Members: Joe Hawkins; Cain Turnley; Scott Nicholls; Ben Mills

Cartman were an Australian alternative rock band from Perth, Western Australia.

== History ==
=== 1997–2001: Early years ===
The band was formed in 1997 in an attempt to enter a songwriting competition by Joe Hawkins, "I had sent in a tape of some songs recorded at home on the four-track, Only trouble was that (to play the songs live) I needed to get a bass player and someone who could sing harmonies" and so called on Cain Turnley, a trusted friend and a more than competent guitarist, "I had two weeks to rehearse the tunes and Id never picked up a bass before."

Performing under the name Mr. Pink, they were knocked out of the contest in the first round but continued to play together for the next four months. In 1998, Scott Nicholls (lead guitar) and Ben Mills (drums) completed the line-up and heralded the beginning of the band that was now affectionately renamed Cartman.

In February 1999, I'm Not a Policeman was released through the national label Phantom Records. The single "Drive" was picked up by the national radio station Triple J and added to high rotation. Many independent radio stations, including Perth's own RTR-FM, jumped onto the single.

At the 1999 WAM Song of the Year, "Drive" won Best Pop Song and Song of the Year with the band also winning the Best Acoustic Song for "Pieces" Joe Hawkins said "The Song Contest money went straight into new equipment. It was extremely handy at the time... the award itself helped raise our profile. It was one of the major reasons the song "Drive" was picked up by Triple J, and was the start of national exposure and acceptance."

In March 2000, the band released their second EP, Nobody, recorded at Revolver Studios and produced by Ben Glatzer. The initial single "Nobody" was added to playlists across the country and the film clip opened the band up visually to a national audience. The single was also picked up by BBC Radio One's Steve Lamacq, who added it to the stations playlist, along with the independent UK network X-FM.

=== 2001–2003: Debut album and break up ===
In January 2002, the band released Go! and the album was selected as Triple J's Album of the Week. The first track of the album, "Shock" was selected as the eviction music for reality TV show Big Brother. "Shock" was voted in the Triple J Hottest 100, 2002. "Shock" was followed by "Got No Reason" and finally "George", a Joe Hawkins/Cartman song. Rotation on Triple J and the commercial networks cemented the album as one of the best Australian releases for 2002.

The band have been on a permanent hiatus since late 2003. Turnley has been performing lead vocals in Perth band The Avenues.

== Members ==
- Joe Hawkins - vocals, electric bass, coustic guitar
- Cain Turnley - vocals, bass, electric guitar, acoustic guitar
- Scott Nicholls - acoustic guitar, electric guitar
- Ben Mills - drums, percussion

== Discography ==
=== Albums ===
Title	Details
Go!	Released: 14 January 2002; Label: Embryo Records (EMR030); Format: CD

=== EPs ===
Title	Details
I'm Not a Policeman	Released: February 1999; Label: Phantom Music (CART9901); Format: CD
Nobody	Released: March 2000; Label: Phantom Music (CART20002); Format: CD
George	Released: October 2002; Label: Embryo Records (EMR 112); Format: CD

== Awards ==
=== WAM Song of the Year ===
The WAM Song of the Year was formed by the Western Australian Rock Music Industry Association Inc. (WARMIA) in 1985, with its main aim to develop and run annual awards recognising achievements within the music industry in Western Australia.

Year	Nominee / work	Award	Result (wins only)
1998	"Drive"	Grand Prize	Won
1998	"Drive"	Pop Song of the Year	Won
1998	"Piece"	Acoustic of the Year	Won
