= The Stems =

Australian garage punk band from Perth, Western Australia

Background information
- Origin: Perth, Western Australia, Australia
- Genres: Garage punk, alternative rock, garage rock, blues punk, power pop
- Years active: 1983–1987, 2003–2009, 2013–present
- Labels: Citadel, White Label, Mushroom, Festival, Shock
- Members: Dom Mariani; Julian Matthews; David Shaw; Ashley Naylor; Davey Lane
- Past members: John Shuttleworth; Gary Chambers; Richard Lane
- Website: www.thestems.com.au

The Stems are a garage punk band founded by Dom Mariani in Perth, Western Australia in late 1983. The group is heavily influenced by 1960s garage rock and 1970s power pop. They broke up in August 1987 and reformed in 2003, releasing a new album in 2007. Although the group disbanded in October 2009, as of 2013 The Stems are an ongoing live concern.

== History ==
=== 1983: Formation ===
The Stems formed in late 1983 when vocalist/guitarist Dom Mariani, formerly in The Go-Starts, was introduced to Richard Lane. Lane had seen Mariani in the final few gigs of The Go-Starts and had asked him for guitar lessons which developed into the decision was made to form The Stems. A friend, Gary Chambers, was recruited to join on drums, and bass guitarist John Shuttleworth was poached from the Pink Armadillos. In March 1984, the band had their debut gig at the Old Civic Theatre in Perth, which was in support of The Saints and The Triffids. Their sound was influenced by 1960s garage acts ranging from the Electric Prunes, The Standells, and The Chocolate Watch Band to The Easybeats. A local Saturday night residency at the Wizbah venue saw throwback covers with a growing list of original songs which developed a cult following for the band. Shuttleworth decided to leave, so a final gig for the band was arranged which drew a large crowd. The success of this gig and freshly written songs caused the band to recruit a new bass player, school friend Julian Matthews.

The Stems played at local venues such as The Wizbah, The Old Melbourne and The Shenton Park Hotel on a regular basis, the group built up a substantial following in Perth, at a time otherwise dominated by cover bands.

=== 1984–1985: Love Will Grow – Rosebud Volume 1 ===
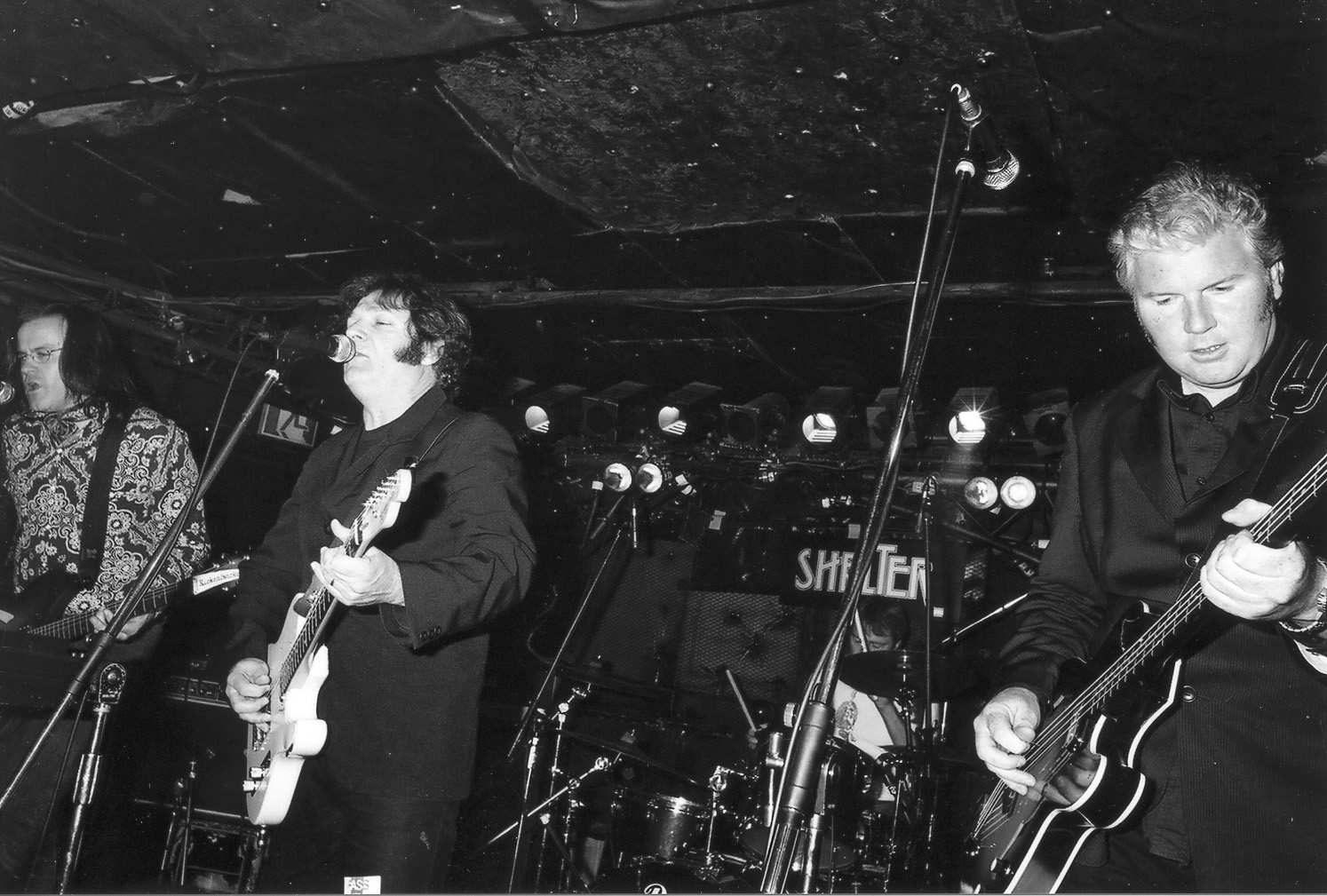
The Stems performing on tour Tokyo, Japan Photo: Masao Nakagami

Late in 1984, they recorded three songs at Shelter Studios in Perth: "She's a Monster", "Make You Mine" and "Tears Me in Two." The original plan was for this to be a self-released single with one track as the A-side and the other two as B-sides. A friend of the band who wanted to help manage them told them he would take the tapes to the east coast and shop them around to the independent labels there. The Stems chose Citadel Records because of the high quality of their releases at the time. In mid-1985, the band went to Sydney to meet up with their new label and promote their first single using two of the songs they had recorded, "Make You Mine"/"She's A Monster." The Stems' first Sydney appearance was a sold-out show with the Painters and Dockers at the Trade Union Club. The tour was perfectly timed with the Sydney inner city scene rediscovering 1960s music and fashion. The group met with an enthusiastic response, culminating in a full house at the legendary Trade Union Club for their final Sydney show. The single reached the top of the independent charts, and also sold 500 copies in England. It was the second highest selling independent single for Australia in 1985, behind Hoodoo Gurus' "Like Wow – Wipeout!." During this period, they rerecorded "Tears Me in Two" and the Love Will Grow – Rosebud Volume 1 EP, both produced by Rob Younger of the Radio Birdman. The EP reached No. 72 in the national charts, and the band played triumphant shows on their return to Perth.

=== 1986–1987: At First Sight, Violets Are Blue and break-up ===
The Stems, with new drummer David Shaw, spent most of 1986 touring to promote their EP. This included national tours supporting Flamin' Groovies and the Hoodoo Gurus. They also sought a major label deal. Mushroom Records signed the band, and The Stems booked into Platinum Studios with producer Alan Thorne at the end of 1986. The recording process didn't go smoothly, and stretched from the planned one month to three, with a new producer brought in to complete the record. At First Sight, Violets Are Blue was released in 1987, their first recording for Mushroom's White Label subsidiary. The album debuted at No. 1 on the Australian alternative charts and 34 on the mainstream charts. It also received national and international critical acclaim and would be one of the best selling Australian albums of that year, despite the lack of commercial airplay in the corporate FM dominated 1980s. Leaning toward a stronger pop sensibility, the album highlighted the talents of Dom Mariani and Richard Lane as skilled tunesmiths of the guitar pop genre. The album was nominated in the top 100 Australian albums of all time by Rolling Stone magazine. In 1987, the band embarked on another national tour and made appearances on national television, including playing the final episode of Countdown. In the same year, the lead single "At First Sight" was also included on the Young Einstein soundtrack. By October 1987, on the eve of a six-week European tour, The Stems disbanded. Mariani's explanation was:

"I was not very happy with the way things were going towards the end of The Stems. We got quite big, and there are the usual problems that happen with that. People tend to drift apart, there are internal conflicts, egos going wild, and bad management was probably the major factor that contributed to The Stems' breakup."

Matthews offered a similar explanation:

"In the end it was total burnout. By the time the band broke up, all of us had had enough. Any of us could have quit at any time. There was also this pull to do other stuff away from the band."

The Stems performed their last live show in their original incarnation on 31 August 1987, but the breakup was not officially announced until November that year. By that time The Stems had released a total of five singles, one EP, and one studio album.

=== 2003–2009: Reformation, Heads Up and second break-up ===
In March 2003, The Stems reunited for a national tour of the local and international music scene. Following the re-release of their album At First Sight, Violets Are Blue and the release of the Mushroom Soup: The Citadel Years in 2003, The Stems found themselves playing to packed houses across the country, touring Europe, playing the prestigious "Little Stevens Underground Garage Festival" in August 2005, and then at the "Come Together Festival" at Sydney's Luna Park with the cream of Australia's newest bands in September 2005.

2006 saw the release of another anthology titled Terminal Cool in the United States by the garage rock and punk label Get Hip Records. The new anthology includes three previously unreleased tracks including the track, "Think Cool" from their early live sets. Two of the band's tracks were included in the recent Rhino Nuggets Box set Children of Nuggets which compiles and documents the Paisley Underground and garage rock of the 1980s.

2007 Tour Poster

In 2007 The Stems undertook a national tour alongside Hoodoo Gurus and Radio Birdman and released their second album, Heads Up on Shock Records. The album contained ten original garage rock tracks. It was recorded in Perth early in 2007 at the analogue and vintage recording compound Kingdom Studios and later mixed at Ultrasuede in Cincinnati by producer John Curley (White Stripes, Afghan Wigs, Greenhornes and Ronnie Spector). The Stems then toured nationally to promote the new album and played their first shows outside Australia, including European dates and a U.S. visit that included the South by Southwest festival in Austin, Texas.

In July 2009 The Stems announced that they would be disbanding later that year, with an eight-date national farewell tour in October.

This is our first farewell. We did break up once but we weren't in good enough shape to say goodbye. This time we'll end it off on a good note. The band's going really well but you just know when it's time to go.

— Dom Mariani

Richard Lane opened the music school Penny Lane's Musical Workshop in Fremantle in 2009. He played in the Chevelles, the Rosebuds, and the On and Ons. He also launched the independent label Idaho Records. He did not participate in later Stems activities and died in 2020. The following year the City of Fremantle gave a previously unnamed laneway, where Lane had operated Penny Lane's for two years, the title Richard Lane.

=== 2013–present: Second reformation ===
In April 2013 The Stems performed at Dig It Up! festival shows in Sydney and Melbourne. The line-up was Mariani, Matthews, Shaw and new guitarist Ashley Naylor in place of Richard Lane. The same line-up played gigs on the east coast in March 2014, including supports for the reunited Sunnyboys in Brisbane and Sydney. Guitarist Davey Lane (The Pictures, no relation to Richard) was also in the band's line-up for some time. On 31 May 2014, The Stems was one the headline acts at Perth's annual 'State of the Art' festival at the Perth Cultural Centre.

== Members ==
- Dom Mariani – vocals, guitar (1983–1987, 2003–2009, 2013-present)
- Richard Lane – vocals, guitar, keyboards, harmonica (1983–1987, 2003–2009) (died May 2020)
- Gary Chambers – drums (1983–1986)
- Julian Matthews – bass guitar, vocals (1984–1987, 2003–2009, 2013-present)
- David Shaw – drums, percussion, vocals (1986–1987, 2003–2009, 2013-present)
- John Shuttleworth – bass guitar (1984)
- Ashley Naylor; guitar, vocals (2013–present)
- Davey Lane; guitar, vocals, keys, harmonica (2017–present)

== Discography ==
=== Studio albums ===
List of albums, with selected details and chart positions
Title	Details	Peak chart positions
Title	Details	AUS
At First Sight, Violets Are Blue	Released: August 1987; Label: White Label/Mushroom (L38735)	34
Heads Up	Released: 6 October 2007; Label: Shock (ST-707)	—

=== Live albums ===
Title	Album details
Weed Out!	Released: 1997; Label: House of Wax (HOWR8); Note: Limited to 1,000 copies. Recorded in 1986
Official Live Recording	Released: August 2024; Label: Cheersquad Records; Note: Limited. Recorded in November2017

=== Compilation albums ===
Title	Album details
The Great Rosebud Hoax	Released: 1987; Label: Citadel (CITLP512)
Buds	Released: 1991; Label: Citadel (CITCD512)
Mushroom Soup: The Citadel Years	Released: March 2003; Label: Citadel (CITCD555)
Terminal Cool (Anthology 1983–1986)	Released: June 2006; Label: Get Hip (GH-1130CD)
Evergreen Scene – The Stems Anthology 1983–87	Released: 2007; Label: Target Earth (TE-020CD)

=== Extended plays ===
Title	EP details	Peak chart positions
Title	EP details	AUS
Love Will Grow – Rosebud Volume 1	Released: February 1986; Label: Citadel (CITEP 903)	72
The Stems	Released: 2004; Label: Freshwater (FR003)	—

=== Singles ===
List of singles, with selected chart positions
Year	Title	Peak chart positions
Year	Title	AUS
1985	"Make You Mine"/"She's a Monster"	—
1985	"Tears Me in Two"/"Can't Resist"	99
1987	"No Heart"/"Lon Chaney Junior's Daughter"	—
1987	"At First Sight"/"Grooviest Girl in Town"	90
1987	"Sad Girl"/"My Beach"	89
1987	"For Always"/"Mr Misery"	—
1993	"Let Your Head Rest"/"Don't Let Me"/"Tears Me in Two"	—
2007	"Leave You Way Behind"/"Take Me To Your"	—
2018	"Won't Let You Go"	—
2018	"Without You"	—
2024	"Falling from the Sky"	—
2025	"Deep Freeze"	—

== Awards ==
=== West Australian Music Industry Awards ===
The West Australian Music Industry Awards are annual awards celebrating achievements for Western Australian music. They commenced in 1985.

Year	Nominee / work	Award	Result
2018	The Stems	Hall of Fame	inductee
