= Ammonia (band) =

Australian music band

Background information
- Origin: Perth, Western Australia, Australia
- Genres: Alternative rock, post-grunge
- Years active: 1992–1999
- Labels: Murmur (Australia); Epic (United States)
- Past members: Dave Johnstone; Allan Balmont; Simon Hensworth; Phil Natt

Ammonia were an Australian alternative rock band from Perth, Western Australia, which made a name for itself in the 1990s, producing a mixture of grunge and guitar pop (a sound they described as "pop-metal"). The group began in 1992, initially comprising guitarist Dave Johnstone (ex–Hideous Goldsteins), drummer Allan Balmont (ex–Dear Octopus, Cherrytones) and bass guitar player Phil Natt. This line-up performed under the name Fuzzswirl and, following the departure of Natt, they continued to perform with a variety of bass guitar players around their hometown of Perth. In 1993, when the bass guitarist Simon Hensworth joined the group, the name was changed to Ammonia. The band was considering the name "Glorious Noise Earthquake", but selected Ammonia for its simplicity after Hensworth stumbled across the word in a science textbook.

== History ==
=== Early success ===
The band's early success was due mostly to their self-financed recordings and word of mouth. The trio released a self-titled cassette and developed a distinctive live sound, driven by Hensworth's overdriven and high volume bass guitar, complemented by Johnstone's infectious pop hooks. By 1994, the band had completed successful tours of Melbourne and Sydney, establishing a solid fan base, and had an album's worth of material recorded. The influential DJ Richard Kingsmill played "Incinerator" from these recordings to a national audience on the alternative radio station Triple J, sparking further interest in the band. Importantly, the band did not independently release these early recordings, as Ammonia was determined to sign with a major label. This was to ensure optimum exposure of their music and, given the isolation of the city, to avoid the pitfalls other independent bands from Perth had experienced.

In 1994, the band did a live recording for Triple J, who in turn added the track "Orange Juice" from the session to its regular play list. The continued airplay created great interest among a number of major record labels, which subsequently began courting the group. That summer, Ammonia was the first band to sign with Sony's Murmur label. (The second band to sign was the then unknown Newcastle group Silverchair.)

=== EPs and Mint 400 ===
Ammonia's first release was the In a Box EP (1994), which was composed of the band's early recordings paired with the newly recorded title song. Again, the band was supported by Triple J, which played a number of songs from the EP, expanding the fan base around Australia, and ensuring another successful tour. In early 1995 a second EP was released, again with the band's self-produced recordings paired with a newly recorded title track. The Sleepwalking EP included the first official release of "Orange Juice" and, aided by continued touring, saw the band cross over from Triple J to commercial radio.

The band juggled live work with the sessions for its first album, Mint 400, which had ten new songs along with newly recorded versions of "In a Box" and "Sleepwalking". The album was produced by the South African producer Kevin Shirley (who also produced Silverchair's debut album Frogstomp). Recorded in only ten days at Festival Studios in Sydney, the recording captured the band's live sound, avoiding excessive overdubs and studio manipulation. Mint 400 was an immediate hit in Australia, jumping into the national charts at number 15. When released as the album's first single, "Drugs" (written in five minutes during a rehearsal), emerged as an instant success, despite certain stations' refusal to play the song because of its title. The song peaked at number 12 on the Australian chart, and emerged in the top 20 of Triple J's Hottest 100. "There isn't really that much of a message," said Johnstone, ""Drugs" is about apathy towards drugs." The success of the single saw the band added to the main stage of the 1995/96 Big Day Out, travelling with the festival nationally.

In light of the success of the album at home, Epic released the album in America, and MTV put the $5,000 video for "Drugs" on high rotation, the cheapest video to ever do so. The band toured America, the UK and Europe throughout 1996, emerging with global record sales over 100,000. "Drugs" was the group's only charting single in the United States, reaching number 29 on the Billboard Modern Rock charts.

=== Eleventh Avenue ===
Returning to Australia, the band recorded and released a single, "Satin Only", which was largely unnoticed and later re-emerged as a hidden track on the band's second album. The band finished the year preparing music for an album which was to be recorded in New York with Dave Fridman (The Flaming Lips, Mogwai and Weezer).

Eleventh Avenue was a very different album from the first, moving away from simple arrangements and traditional rock instrumentation. The record retains the initial chemistry of the band, but is sonically complex, adding harmonies, samples and psychedelic keyboards. After completion of the album, the band realised that they were unable to play it live. So, in mid-1997, after some dates with Something for Kate's Paul Dempsey on second guitar, Johnstone and Balmont asked the original bass guitar player Phil Natt to rejoin the band, only this time as a vocalist/ guitarist/ keyboard player. They followed this with a show supporting Magic Dirt and Silverchair in December 1997 in the lead up to the release of the new album.

The first single from the album was "You're Not the Only One Who Feels This Way", which was quickly added to radio. This was followed by the single "Monochrome". The album, Eleventh Avenue, was released in 1998. The two singles featured prominently on Australian radio, as did the final single from the album "Keep on My Side", released later that year.

=== Break-up ===
Because of heavy touring in support of its second album, tensions within the group reached breaking point. Consequently, at the end of 1998, Ammonia announced that it was splitting up. Wanting to go out on a high, it was decided to play the final gigs as part of the Australian festival circuit. As a result of this decision, the band's final Sydney show was at the Homebake Festival, its final Victorian performance at The Falls Festival, and the very last Ammonia show was on the Main Stage of the Perth Big Day Out in January 1999.

Johnstone and Natt went on to form a new band, The Peaks, with Dan O'Halloran and Shaun Lohar, which released its first album, Avoca, in November 2004.

In 2007, Johnstone was recording and playing with The Lazybirds, featuring Ian Freeman, Jeff Baker, Phil Natt and Shaun Lahour. In 2019 Johnstone released an album with the band Quick Quick Slow. As of 2021, Johnstone is performing under his own moniker.

In February 2001, Hensworth joined the 7-piece showband Potato Stars on bass guitar and played in the band during most of 2001.

Allan Balmont was the tour manager for The Living End and performed on Bob Evans' first album, Suburban Kid.

== Members ==
- Allan Balmont – drums (1992–1999)
- Simon Hensworth – bass (1993–1999)
- Dave Johnstone – guitar, vocals (1992–1999)
- Phil Natt – bass (1992) guitar, keyboards, backing vocals (1997–1999)

== Discography ==
=== Studio albums ===
| Title | Details | Peak chart positions | |
| Title | Details | AUS | US CMJ |
|---|---|---|---|
| Mint 400 | Released: 16 October 1995; Label: Murmur (MATTCD023); Format: CD; LP (Cat. MATTV023) | 15 | 49 |
| Eleventh Avenue | Released: 8 May 1998; Label: Murmur (MATTCD069); Format: CD | 20 | — |

=== Extended plays ===
| Title | Details | Peak chart positions |
| Title | Details | AUS |
|---|---|---|
| In a Box | Released: October 1994; Label: Murmur (MATTCD002); Format: CD | 78 |
| Sleepwalking EP | Released: March 1995; Label: Murmur (MATTCD007); Format: CD | 86 |
| Limited Live & Rare | Released: 1997; Label: Murmur (SAMP 1063); Format: CD | — |

=== Singles ===
| Year | Title | Peak chart positions | Album |
| Year | Title | AUS | Album |
|---|---|---|---|
| 1995 | "Drugs" | 32 | Mint 400 |
| 1996 | "Ken Carter" | 50 | Mint 400 |
| 1996 | "Suzi Q" | 116 | Mint 400 |
| 1996 | "Satin Only" | 146 | non-album single |
| 1997 | "You're Not the Only One Who Feels This Way" | 83 | Eleventh Avenue |
| 1998 | "Monochrome" | 138 | Eleventh Avenue |
| 1998 | "Keep on My Side" | 162 | Eleventh Avenue |

== Awards and nominations ==
=== ARIA Music Awards ===
The ARIA Music Awards is an annual awards ceremony that recognises excellence, innovation, and achievement across all genres of Australian music. They commenced in 1987.

| Year | Nominee / work | Award | Result | Ref. |
|---|---|---|---|---|
| 1996 | Mint 400 | Breakthrough Artist - Album | Nominated | |
| 1996 | "Drugs" | Single of the Year | Nominated | |
