= Murmur (record label) =

Australian record label; imprint of Sony Music Entertainment (Australia) Limited

- Parent company: Sony Music Entertainment
- Founded: 1994; 32 years ago
- Founder: John Watson; John O'Donnell
- Defunct: 2007
- Status: Defunct
- Genre: Alternative rock; grunge; post-grunge
- Country of origin: Australia

Murmur was a record label that started as an imprint of Sony Music Australia in mid-1994. Named after R.E.M.'s first album, Murmur signed a number of Australia's most successful rock bands, including Silverchair, Ammonia, Something for Kate and Jebediah. Notable alumni of Murmur include John O'Donnell, a former Rolling Stone journalist who became the head of EMI Australia, and John Watson, who runs a music management company and independent record label Eleven.

== History ==
While the label was initially operated independently, it was eventually merged with Sony's head office in 1999. In 2007, Something for Kate, the label's only remaining act, released the final contractual album with Murmur.

== Roster 1994–2007 ==
- Ammonia
- Automatic
- Beaverloop
- B(if)tek
- Bluebottle Kiss
- Blueline Medic
- Charlton Hill
- Gilgamesh
- Jebediah
- Knievel
- Lo-Tel
- Silverchair
- Sin Dog Jellyroll
- Something for Kate

== See also ==
- List of record labels
