= Something in the Water (2008 film) =

- Original poster
- Directed by: Aidan O'Bryan
- Written by: Aidan O'Bryan
- Produced by: Janelle Landers
- Cinematography: David Le May; Aidan O'Bryan; Mark Parish
- Edited by: Leanne Cole; Aidan O'Bryan; Chris Trappe
- Distributed by: WBMC
- Release date: 14 February 2008
- Running time: 75 minutes
- Country: Australia
- Language: English

Something in the Water is a 2008 Australian documentary film written and directed by Aidan O'Bryan. Using live, archival, and interview footage shot in Los Angeles, Melbourne, Perth, Sydney, and Windsor in Berkshire, England, it explores the history and environment behind the development of local and nationally acclaimed musical talent in Western Australia.

The film was funded by Perth media production company WBMC, headed by screenwriter/director Aidan O'Bryan and producer Janelle Landers.

The film follows the rise to fame of some of Western Australia's most successful musicians. Something in the Water features more than fifty interviews with bands including Little Birdy, The Waifs, The Sleepy Jackson, Eskimo Joe, End of Fashion, Jebediah, Le Hoodoo Gurus, The Panics and Red Jezebel. The film asks whether Perth's talented spawn can be attributed to the city's isolation, the environment or the music scene itself, or whether there is, in fact, something in the water.

Something in the Water premiered at the Astor Theatre in Perth and had a limited theatrical run in that city. It later was shown at the FTI Fremantle Film Festival and the 2008 WAMi Festival. An accompanying two-disc compilation of various Western Australian artists became available via MGM Distribution as well as online in January 2009.

The film was screened on ABC2 on 13 May 2009. Following this national broadcast, the film was released on DVD on 3 July 2009 via MGM Distribution. The DVD includes additional interview footage with Eskimo Joe, John Butler, The Triffids, Dave Faulkner and Kim Salmon.

Some people have noted that the film neglects to mention some of the more notable Perth performers from the 1970s and even 1960s. While Johnny Young makes an appearance, other performers like Glen Ingram & The Hi-Five, Bakery, The Elks, Fatty Lumpkin, Sid Rumpo, Dave Warner, The Dugites and Rip Torn & The Stockings and groundbreaking producer Martin Clark and his Clarion Records are completely ignored (although The Dugites do make an appearance on the film's soundtrack double CD release).

== Featured entertainers ==
- Eskimo Joe
- Little Birdy
- John Butler Trio
- The Sleepy Jackson
- The Triffids
- Hoodoo Gurus
- The Scientists
- Rolf Harris
- Baby Animals
- Red Jezebel
- Schvendes
- Robbie Buck and Richard Kingsmill from triple j
- Stephen Malkmus from Pavement
- The Kill Devil Hills
- Birds of Tokyo
- Karnivool
- Snowman
- The Victims
- The Silents
- Johnny Young
- Gyroscope
- The Stems
- The Panics
- Sugar Army
- The Panda Band
- Bob Evans
- Jebediah
- Sex Panther
- Abbe May
- The Waifs
- End of Fashion
- INXS

== Soundtrack ==
The soundtrack includes music from the film as well as music that inspired the film.

=== Track listing ===
Something in the Water - Disc 1
No.	Title	Writer(s)	Length
1.	"From the Sea"	Eskimo Joe	3:21
2.	"Relapse"	Little Birdy	3:40
3.	"O Yeah"	End of Fashion	3:04
4.	"Beware Wolf"	Gyroscope	3:26
5.	"Good Dancers"	The Sleepy Jackson	4:14
6.	"Flame"	Bob Evans	3:18
7.	"Sun Dirt Water"	The Waifs	3:39
8.	"Something's Gotta Give"	John Butler Trio	3:11
9.	"Drinking Too Much"	The Kill Devil Hills	4:01
10.	"Desire Be, Desire Go"	Tame Impala	4:13
11.	"Hoodoo You Do"	The Devil & Abbe May	4:10
12.	"Swimming with Sharks"	Snowman	2:40
13.	"Bish Bosh II: The Bish Bosh"	Tucker B's	4:46
14.	"Pretty Boys"	Sex Panther	3:34
15.	"Sleeping Dogs"	Schvendes	4:38
16.	"City Walls and Empires"	Institut Polaire	4:23
17.	"Black Sheets"	Birds of Tokyo	3:16
18.	"I Got Your Soul"	Sugar Army	3:30
19.	"Nightcrawl"	The Silents	2:51
20.	"Kicking Deadly Sins"	Red Jezebel	2:45
21.	"The General Calling"	The Panics	5:13

Something in the Water - Disc 2
No.	Title	Writer(s)	Length
1.	"Wide Open Road"	The Triffids	4:11
2.	"At First Sight"	The Stems	4:03
3.	"Tojo Never Made It To Darwin"	Hoodoo Gurus	3:25
4.	"Frantic Romantic"	The Scientists	2:48
5.	"Television Addict"	The Victims	3:00
6.	"Centre of Pride"	The Manikins	2:47
7.	"I Like It Both Ways"	Supernaut	3:41
8.	"In Your Car"	The Dugites	3:00
9.	"Heaven (Must Be There)"	Eurogliders	3:45
10.	"Rush You"	Baby Animals	4:11
11.	"Restoration"	Header	5:24
12.	"Drugs"	Ammonia	3:29
13.	"Leaving Home"	Jebediah	3:08
14.	"Old Soul"	Rosemary Beads	3:47
15.	"Crystal Beerhouse"	Adam Said Galore	3:57
16.	"Jump for Joy"	Cinema Prague	3:08
17.	"Enemy Mine"	Blackeyed Susans	4:09
18.	"Set Back"	Johnny Young and Kompany	1:53
19.	"Hallowed Ground"	Yummy Fur	8:40

== Additional sources ==
- "New documentary about Perth musicians". PerthNow. 21 December 2007. Archived from the original on 27 December 2007.
- "Something in the Water". PerthNow. 12 January 2008. Archived from the original on 13 January 2008.
- XPress, 17 January 2008
- The West Australian, 2 February 2008
- The Drum Media, 24 January 2008
- jmag, February 2008
- FasterLouder.com.au
- Perth NORG
- Perfkids
- NorgBlog
- Inside Film

== See also ==
- Western Australian Music Industry Association
