= Alex Archer (musician) =

American-born Australian musician

- Born: 27 May 1970 (age 56)
- Origin: Seattle, Washington, United States
- Genres: Rock, alt country, soundtrack
- Occupations: Musician, songwriter
- Instruments: Violin, piano, guitar, clarinet, organ,
- Years active: 1999–present
- Member of: The Kill Devil Hills

Chad Alexander Archer (born 27 May 1970) is an American-born Australian musician. Archer is best known for his violin work in the Fremantle based Alt country/rock band The Kill Devil Hills.

== Early life ==
Archer was born in Seattle, Washington, US. He was raised in Darrington, Washington, and graduated from Darrington High School in 1988.

== Career ==
As well as performing and recording three albums with Kill Devil Hills, Archer has performed and recorded with various Australian artists, most notably Abbe May and also with Felicity Groom.

In 2010, Archer was named best instrumentalist at the WAMi Awards. In 2012 he performed at the Rock-It Festival.

== Discography ==
=== The Kill Devil Hills (2003–present) ===
- Heathen Songs – Torn and Frayed/Reverberation (2004)
- The Drought – Torn and Frayed/Shock (TORNCD16) (7 October 2006)
- Man, You Should Explode – Torn and Frayed/Shock (TORNCD24) (25 September 2009)

=== Abbe May ===
- Abbe May and the Rockin Pneumonia 2009, EP.
