= Tim Brady =

Canadian composer, musician and producer

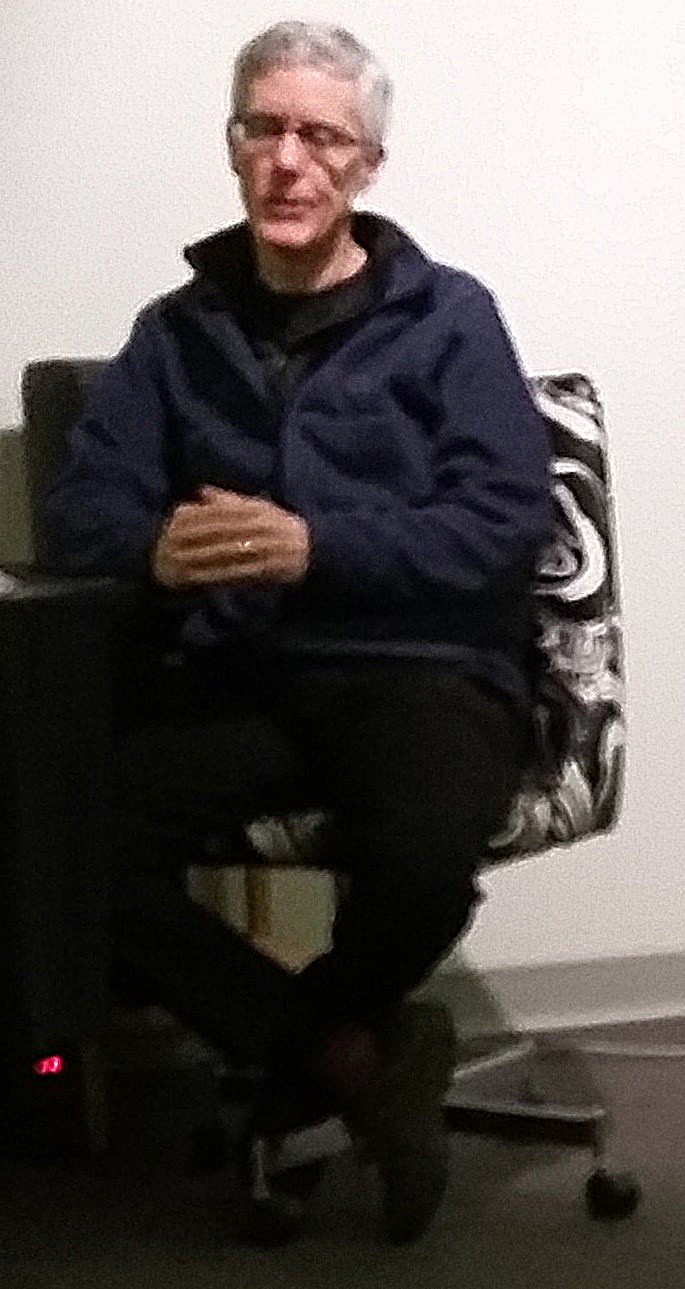
Tim Brady photographed in Montreal, Quebec, Canada at the Église du Gesù.

Timothy Wesley John Brady (born 11 July 1956) is a Canadian composer, electric guitarist, improvising musician, concert producer, record producer and cultural activist. Working in the field of contemporary classical music, experimental music, and musique actuelle, his compositions utilize a variety of styles from serialism to minimalism and often incorporate modern instruments such as electric guitars and other electroacoustic instruments. His music is marked by a synthesis of musical languages, having developed an ability to use elements of many musical styles while retaining a strong sense of personal expression. Some of his early recognized works are the 1982 orchestral pieces Variants and Visions, his Chamber Concerto (1985), the chamber trio ...in the Wake... (1985, 1988), and his song cycle Revolutionary Songs (1994).

He is internationally recognized as one of the world's leading experimental/new music guitarists (1997, Guitar Player: "One of the 30 Most Important Guitarists for the Future of the Instrument"), and in recent years has gained a strong reputation as one of Canada's leading composers of chamber, orchestral and music theatre works (2003 Prix OPUS Composer of the Year award, given by the Conseil québécois de la musique; 2006 Jan V. Matejcek award, given by SOCAN).

== Biography ==
=== Early years and studies ===
Brady was born in Montréal on 11 July 1956. He began playing guitar at age eleven and was largely self-taught until the age of nineteen, with the exception of 18 months of basic beginner guitar lessons (chords and strumming, playing acoustic folk music). He switched from acoustic to electric guitar at sixteen, and started his own rock band soon after. The band (going under the names Tosh and Mystrale) quickly became a vehicle for not only playing, but also for composing music and by nineteen his interest in jazz and other instrumental music had eclipsed the abilities of the rock (now almost jazz-fusion) group.

Brady studied music at Concordia University in Montreal (1975–1978, composition with Alan Crossman, guitar with Claude Dyotte), followed by graduate studies at the New England Conservatory of Music in Boston (1978–1980, composition with W. Thomas McKinley and guitar with the legendary Mick Goodrick).

=== The Toronto period (1980–1986) ===
In 1980 Brady moved to Toronto where he began working both as a contemporary classical composer and as a jazz guitarist. In Toronto his work as a composer was still strongly influenced by modernist tendencies (i.e.: Elliott Carter, Anton Webern, Pierre Boulez), including his earliest professional chamber piece for voice and ensemble, 4 Songs and an Intermezzo, and other early works such as his String Quartet #1, the chamber work Five Settings (1983, commissioned by Arraymusic), and the Chamber Concerto (1985, commissioned by New Music Concerts). A series of imaginative but conventional modernist chamber and orchestral works would start to make Brady's reputation as a composer across Canada, and would win him 5 composition awards from CAPAC (now SOCAN) from 1982 to 1986, and he was a finalist in the 1986 Canadian Broadcasting Corporation Young Composers' Competition, with the work Visions. His most ambitious and complex modernist work, the 1982 orchestral score Variants, was premiered by the Esprit Orchestra in Toronto in the 1987–1988 season, recorded by the Canadian Broadcasting Corporation, as a result of winning the 1986 Micheline Coulombe St-Marcoux Prize (CAPAC).

However, two works of the Toronto period point to the future vision of music as a more unified means of expression, without stylistic boundaries: SOUND OFF (1983), for 40 saxes, 30 trombones, 30 trumpets and 8 bass drums (an outdoor performance piece – unperformed until 1999) and Visions (1984), for improvising soloist and string orchestra. This latter work was to become his first CD release in 1988, in a remarkable performance by trumpeter Kenny Wheeler, with the Orchestre de chambre de Montréal.

=== First recordings, first productions ===
Brady also recorded and produced his first 4 records in Toronto – an ECM-influenced jazz trio set of original tunes called Chalk Paper, a recording of 3 chamber works for solo piano (performed by Marc Wider), and two digitally recorded LPs of music for solo guitar and electronics: dR.E.aM.s (1985) and The Persistence of Vision (1987). These two solo recordings began to make his reputation as a guitar innovator both in Canada and internationally.

Brady's Toronto years also mark the beginning of his work as a concert producer. In 1982 he founded the production company Contemporary Music Projects, and he would produce and perform in major jazz orchestra events with iconic American jazz arranger Gil Evans (1984) and maverick Canadian trumpeter/composer Kenny Wheeler (1985).

During this period his various jazz groups/big bands performed in clubs and concerts in Toronto and Montréal, and did recordings of his original jazz works for the CBC Radio programme Jazz Beat, as well as for the new music/contemporary classical programme Two New Hours. Brady had his first major international collaboration in 1983, performing a duo concert at the Edmonton Jazz City Festival with the Hungarian bass virtuoso Aladar Pege.

=== London interval (1986–1987) ===
From 1986 to 1987 Brady lived in London, England, studying conducting privately with Odaline de la Martinez, playing jazz gigs with well-known UK jazz musicians such as Clark Tracey and Guy Barker, and recording a studio concert of originals for the BBC.

=== Montreal, part 1: Bradyworks (1987–1997) ===
Upon returning to Montreal in 1987, Brady founded his own chamber group and production company in order to have some control over his work, and his new vision of creative music. The group was named simply "Bradyworks".

The first major Bradyworks project was Inventions, a 90-minute music and dance collaboration, created in conjunction with Ottawa choreographer Julie West. The work included the 5 musicians of Bradyworks plus the jazz soloists Barre Phillips (bass) and John Surman (saxophones). A CD of the project was released in the autumn of 1991, to coincide with the groups' first major tour, including 13 concerts across Canada, plus a performance at Roulette, New York's well-known experimental music space. The tour featured a chamber work entitled The Songline, which had been commissioned by and premiered at the Festival international de musique actuelle de Victoriaville (FIMAV).

This project, as with almost all of his recorded productions since 1988, was produced in collaboration with engineer and producer Morris Apelbaum, who also works as live sound engineer for the Bradyworks ensemble.

1992 saw the release of his landmark solo guitar and electronics CD Imaginary Guitars. This was followed by several other solo guitar CDs, all focusing on composing new music for guitar with electronics and tape: Scenarios (1994), Strange Attractors (1997) and the double CD 10 Collaborations (2000). All these recordings were on the Justin Time Records label, out of Montreal. Brady toured extensively in the 1990s as a solo guitarist, including performances at the 1993 Printemps de Bourges music festival, the 1993 Winnipeg Symphony Orchestra New Music Festival (with his first electric guitar concerto, LOUD), the 1993 Bang on a Can Festival, a 1994 collaboration with the Relâche ensemble in Philadelphia, a 1995 UK tour for the Sonic Arts Network with a performance for the BBC at The South Bank (London), a commission and a solo performance at Maison Radio-France (INA-GRM, Paris) in 1996 (and again in 2001), the 1997 Huddersfield Contemporary Music Festival, and the 1999 Strange Attractor's world tour, with 23 concerts in Canada, the United States, Europe, Australia, Japan and Hong Kong, including a performance at the Festival international de Jazz de Montréal.

=== The Body Electric Festival (1997) ===
Since 1994 Brady had been running the concert production company Innovations en concert, producing many different events in Montreal, some with his music, but also producing concerts by many touring and local musicians as well. In 1995 Brady had the idea of producing the first-ever international festival of contemporary chamber and orchestral music for electric guitar.

In collaboration with partners in Toronto, Jonquière, Winnipeg, Victoria, Vancouver, and New York City, he created the festival The Body Electric / Guitarévolution, which was held in 1997, presenting a total of 23 concerts. The event featured performances by David Torn, the Fred Frith Quartet, Elliott Sharp, René Lussier, Ron Samworth, Greg Lowe, John Oliver, Kapser Toeplitz, Scott Johnson and Paul Dresher. Brady also premiered his second electric guitar concerto, The Body Electric (1997), on the closing night of the event, a work commissioned by the Canadian Broadcasting Corporation and performed by the Esprit Orchestra. A second, somewhat smaller version of the festival was held in 2002.

=== Bradyworks – vocal music (1997–2000) ===
Parallel to his work as a guitarist, his interest in opera, music theatre and vocal music had become one of his main artistic preoccupations. From 1989 to 1992 he worked on a chamber opera version of the Man Booker prize-winning novel The Bone People, by New Zealand author Keri Hulme. The project was never completed due to difficulties in working with Hulme, but it sparked a keen interest in vocal music and music theatre which continues in his current works.

Out of this failed opera experience came his first major song-cycle, entitled Revolutionary Songs (1993), based on a variety of poems in English, French and Spanish. Sung by soprano Nathalie Paulin, and scored for Bradyworks, the work was premiered at the Musée d’art contemporain de Montréal and later released on CD in 1996, supported by a 5-city Canadian tour. The work combines pulsing, jazz and minimalist inflected harmonies with distorted rock guitar and a large range of electronic tape sounds to create a 40-minute portrait of the experience of political revolution. The work had three American performances in 2001, at The Kitchen (New York City, performed by Bradyworks), in Kansas City (New Ear Ensemble), and in Boston (Auros New Music Ensemble).

A second Bradyworks song-cycle followed, entitled The Knife Thrower's Partner (1997), using only a quartet of acoustic instruments in setting a text by Canadian poet Douglas Burnet Smith (whose work Brady would use again in 2009). Bradyworks toured this piece across Canada in 2000, giving 8 performances with mezzo-soprano Anne-Marie Donovan.

=== Montreal, part 2: operas, Ambiances magnétiques, CNMN (2002–2005) ===
In 2002 Brady parted company amicably with Justin Time Records and began working with Ambiances Magnétiques based in Montreal. The first release was of his work 20 Quarter Inch Jacks, a piece for 20 electric guitars, commissioned by the Festival Les Coups de Théâtre. In 2003 he released Unison Rituals, a CD of his music for saxophone and chamber ensemble, including the first of many collaborations with the Quasar saxophone quartet, and an overdubbed and reduced performance of the 1983 work SOUND OFF, for 100 winds and 8 bass drums. Later in 2003 Bradyworks performed its first European tour, with concerts in London (for the BBC at Maida Vale), Aberdeen University (Scotland) and at the Project Arts Centre in Dublin (Ireland) as part of the Crash Ensemble's New Music Festival.

2002 saw the premiere of his 45-minute, multi-movement work Playing Guitar: Symphony #1, for solo electric guitar, sampler and 15 musicians. The work was performed in Montreal (Oscar Peterson Hall, Concordia University – Oct. 2002), Marseille (G.M.E.M. – Festival Les Musiques – May 2003) and New York (Interpretation Series, Merkin Hall – November 2002) by its commissioner, the Nouvel Ensemble Moderne, and was released on CD in 2004. 2002 also saw the premiere of his orchestral work Three or Four Days After the Death of Kurt Cobain by the Orchestre symphonique de Montréa under conductor Rafael Frubek de Burghos, followed by a performance by the Winnipeg Symphony Orchestra in 2004.

The next few years would be occupied with the creation and production of Brady's two chamber operas: The Salome Dancer (2005 – libretto by John Sobol, commissioned and produced by NUMUS concerts at the Open Ears Festival, with Bradyworks in the pit, conducted by Paul Pulford, with stage direction by Anne-Marie Donovan), and Three Cities in the Life of Dr. Norman Bethune (2003) – found-text libretto by the composer, commissioned by La Société Radio-Canada, premiered by Bradyworks and baritone Michael Donovan in Montreal. Bethune had subsequent productions in Lennoxville, Toronto and Guelph (conducted by Pierre Simard), and was released on CD in 2005.

Brady left the Innovations en concert production company in 2004 to focus on his own projects (running under the Bradyworks banner), and to work on the beginnings of what would eventually become the Canadian New Music Network (CNMN, 2005). The CNMN is a large, pan-Canadian movement to make contemporary creative concert music a more vibrant part of Canadian society. The organization brings artists together in an annual event entitled FORUM, held in a different Canadian city each year (Winnipeg – 2007, Toronto – 2008, Montreal – 2009). Brady is the current president of the CNMN (2005–2010). Since 2004 he has served on the board of directors of The Music Gallery.

=== Return of the solo (now multi-media) guitarist / orchestral maneuvers (2006–present) ===
In 2006 Brady released his first solo CD in 6 years, GO [guitar obsession], signaling a renewed interest in electric guitar music. The CD combined several of his works with pieces by composers Alex Burton, Tristan Murail, Jean-François Laporte and Laurence Crane. He toured music from the CD to the Netherlands in January 2007 in collaboration with the Quasar saxophone quartet (concerts in Eindhoven, Utrecht and at the BIMHAUS in Amsterdam), and in July of the same year he toured the project to Australia, performing in Brisbane (The Powerhouse, with Topology), Perth (Tura Concerts), and at the Darwin International Guitar Festival. He was back in the Netherlands in September 2007 for several performances, and also to give a lecture on new music and the electric guitar, at the OUTPUT Electric Guitar Festival, held in the Muziekgebouw, in Amsterdam.

2006 saw the first of two major collaborations with Montréal video artist Martin Messier: the work was entitled My 20th Century, a music/video/theatre work for the Bradyworks ensemble. The work toured Québec in 2008, including a performance at the Festival international de musique actuelle de Victoriaville, and undertook a 9-city Canadian tour in the autumn of 2009, to coincide with the release of the CD and DVD on Ambiances magnètiques.

Brady's renewed interest in solo performance led to his second collaboration with Messier: the 65-minute work for video and electric guitar entitled 24 Frames, premiered in Montreal in October 2008. Another long-term collaborator, the Topology ensemble of Brisbane. Australia, brought out a CD of Brady's chamber work in 2007, entitled SCAT, on Ambiances magnètiques. His 2002 work 20 Quarter Inch Jacks was given its American premiere in January 2009, produced by CALARTS at the REDCAT Hall of the Disney Auditorium, in Los Angeles, and at Rosza Hall in Calgary in 2012.

After many years away from the orchestral composition, 2007 onwards saw a major increase in orchestral works by Brady. This new orchestral music is very different from his earlier, modernist works. Recent orchestral scores include The Choreography of Time: Symphony #2 (for saxophone quartet and orchestra, another collaboration with the Quasar group and the Winnipeg Symphony Orchestra), Opposites Attract, a bass clarinet concerto commissioned by the CBC Radio Orchestra for Lori Freedman, The Guess Who Symphony, a series of radical deconstruction of songs by the 1960s/1970s rock group The Guess Who (also a Canadian Broadcasting Corporation commission), Requiem 21.5 (for solo violin and orchestra) and Un Amour, un Hiver, for voice and orchestra, with text by Québec pop icon Michel Rivard. The last two works are part of his work with the Orchestre symphonique de Laval, where he served as composer in residence (2008–2013).

The relationship with Laval created the first version of his work "Requiem 21.5 – concerto for violin and orchestra", as well as his "Viola Concerto", written for OSL violist Jutta Puchhammer-Sédillot. From 2011 – 2015 Brady worked closely with Symphony Nova Scotia, in Halifax, premiering both final version of "Requiem 21.5" as well as a commissioned work: "The How and the Why of Memory: Symphony #4". These two works, along with the Viola Concerto, were recorded for Centrediscs, and released in 2015. The CD won an East Coast Music Award for Best Classical CD.

His work "Atacama: Symphony #3" was premiered in 2012, released in ATMA Classique in 2013, and nominated for a Juno that year. It was performed as well at the Festival international de musique actuelle de Victoriaville (2013) and in New York at National Sawdust in 2015, but David T. Little's Newspeak Ensemble and Trinity Wall Street Choir, conducted by Julian Wachner.

2015 saw the premier of his chamber opera "Ghost Tango" (libretto by Douglas Smith) in Halifax (NS), and Kitchener (ON), and 2016 saw the release of the first CD of his new electric guitar quartet, Instruments of Happiness, on the US Starkland Records label. From 2014 – 2017 he also worked on the music for choreographer Isabelle van Grimde's multi-media piece "Symphonie 5.1", in collaboration with drummer Thom Gossage. The work toured to Canada, The Netherlands and France. The Instruments of Happiness Quartet did a major Canadian tour in 2017, performing in Edmonton, Halifax, Regina, Brandon, Winnipeg, Victoria, and Montreal.

2015 also saw his fort work for 100 spatialised electric guitars "100 Very Good Reasons Why", performed at the Montreal/Nouvelles Musiqeu Festival. A YouTube video of that work has proved quite popular. In 2016 he presented another work for 100 guitars – "100 questions, 100 réponse", this time in a church. The work was featured in an article on the history of the electric guitar in UK's Guardian newspaper in August 2016.

In 2014, after 9 years at the head of the Canadian New Music Network, he stepped down as president. He served on the board until 2017, but is still active in cultural policy development. He was awarded the Canadian Music Centre/Canadian League of Composers, "Friends of Canadian Music Award" in 2016 for his work at CNMN.

Two major chamber works were premiered at the 2017 Festival international de musique actuelle de Victoriaville: "Désir: concerto for electric guitar and large ensemble" and "8 Songs about: Symphony #7". Brady was the soloist in the concerto, and conducted the symphony, which featured the voices of Vincent Ranallo and Sarah Albu. Both works are for a chamber group of 13 players, and were recorded for release in 2018.

=== Instruments of Happiness (2015 – ) ===
In 2015 Brady launched the Instruments of Happiness electric guitar project. The project has 3 parts: an electric guitar chamber quartet, a guitar ensemble of 12 – 20 professionals, and large, site-specific projects for 100 to 150 electric guitars, primarily based around using community, amateur performers. The quartet toured Canada in 2017, and again in 2018 with singer Marie-Annick Béliveau, and made a small US tour in 2019 (New York, Pittsburgh, Chicago). Major site-specific projects for 100 – 150 guitars (all of which are filmed and available on YouTube) include: 2015 – 100 Very Good Reasons Why – Festival MNM – Montreal

2016 – 100 Questions, 100 Réponses – Église le Gesù, Montréal 2016 – 100 Very Good Reasons Why – Modulus Festival – Vancouver 2017 – Hymne Sauvage – Complex Desjardins – Montreal (music by Alexandre David) 2017 – 100 Very Good Reasons Why – Stratford Summer Music Festival – Stratford, ON

2018 – While 100 Guitar Gently Weep – Luminato Festival – Toronto

2019 – As Many Strings As Possible, Playing: Symphony #9 – St. Joseph's Oratory – Festival MNM – Montreal

2021 – Virtual Concerto for an Imaginary Space – an iPhone/video-based production for 62 socially distanced electric guitars

With the exception of the 2017 "Hymne sauvage" project, (music by composer Alexandre David) all the music for the site-specific project is composed by Tim Brady.

== Recordings ==
=== As leader/composer/soloist ===
CDs

- 2021 – Actions Speak Louder – 3 CD-set – Act 1 – Solo – Simple Loops in Complex Times / Act. 2 – Of Sound, Mind and Body – Triple Concerto: Because Everything Has Changed / Act. 3 – Voices – Bradyworks, Mirror Image (Redshift Records)
- 2019 – Instruments of Happiness – The Happiness Handbook (Starkland Records)
- 2018 – Music for Large Ensemble – Tim Brady (Starkland records)
- 2016 – Instruments of Happiness – electric guitar quartet (Starkland records)
- 2016 – Of Sound, Mind and Body: concert #3 (improvised music) (Redshift Records)
- 2015 – The How and the Why of Memory – Symphony Nova Scotia (Centrediscs)
- 2013 – Atacama: Symphonie #3 (ATMA Classique) – JUNO nomination 2014

==== CDs and DVDs on Ambiances magnètiques ====
- 2011 – 24 Frames: Scatter
- 2010 – 24 Frames: Trance
- 2009 – My 20th Century
- 2007 – SCAT (because we all have voices and stories to tell)
- 2006 – GO [guitar obsession]
- 2005 – Three Cities in the Life of Dr. Norman Bethune
- 2004 – Playing Guitar: Symphony #1
- 2003 – Unison Rituals
- 2002 – Twenty Quarter Inch

==== CDs on Justin Time Records ====
- 2000 – 10 Collaborations
- 1997 – Strange Attractors
- 1996 – Revolutionary Songs
- 1994 – Scenarios
- 1992 – Imaginary Guitars
- 1991 – Inventions
- 1990 – Double Variations (with John Abercrombie)
- 1988 – Visions

==== Vinyl ====
- 1987 – Persistence of Vision (Apparition Records)
- 1985 – dR.E.aM.s (Apparition Records)
- 1984 – Music for Solo Piano (Apparition Records)
- 1983 – Chalk Paper (C-Note Records)

=== As composer ===
The following compositions by Tim Brady are also featured on compact discs:

- Slow Dances – for clarinet and string quartet – Jean-Guy Boisver (cl.) + Quatuor Bozzini (CD: "Le livres des méloncoliques")
- public space / private music – for solo tape (installation) – on "4 × 4 Commissions" CD, limited edition put out by the Centre for Contemporary Arts in Glasgow, Scotland (2001)
- Quartet 1998 – for saxophone quartet – on self-titled CD by the group Quasar
- Waiter, Waiter, Call the Manager – for big band – on the self-titled CD by the KAPPA ensemble (1998)
- Trois histoires – Brady's performance of Roche noire (chronique irlandaise) appears on this recording of music by composer / guitarist René Lussier
- Circling – original version for flute and vibraphone – on Marie-Josée Simard and Lise Daoust's CD "L'Aube Enchantée – Enchanted Dawn"
- Reaching Past – for harpsichord and tape – on Vivienne Spiteri's "New Music for Harpsichord from Canada and the Netherlands"
- Changes – for piano, vibraphone and marimba – on Marie-Josée Simard's self-titled solo CD
- Doubling – solo harpsichord version – on Vivienne Spiteri's "comme si l'hydrogène...the desert speaks"

== Sources ==
=== Magazine articles and reviews ===
- Guitar Player Magazine – review 1985; articles: 1994, 1997, 2007
- DownBeat Magazine – CD reviews 1999, 2001, 2003, 2005; preview article, 2008
- Musicworks Magazine – 1997 article by Andrew Hurlbut, numerous CD & concert reviews over the years, articles by Brady on a variety of issues
- The Wire – article, 1991; review, 2007
- La scena musicale – cover article, 2004
- Paroles & Musique Magazine (SOCAN) – cover article, 2002
- The Canadian Composer (CAPAC) – article, 1983
- Option – article, 1989
- Canadian Musician Magazine – 1993
- Avancées Magazine (France) – 1993
- Le Dauphiné (Annecy, France) – 1993
- La Nouvelle République (France) – 1993
- Toronto EYE Magazine – article, 1993
- OPUS Magazine (Toronto) – article, 2007
- Whole Note Magazine (Toronto) – article, 2004
- Electronic Musician – article, 1 July 2005
- Opera Canada Magazine – review, 2005
- Grok Magazine (Perth) – article, 2007
- Allaboutjazz (online publication) – review, 22 May 2008

=== Newspapers ===
==== Multiple references ====
The Globe and Mail, Toronto Star, Toronto NOW Magazine, Montréal La Presse, The Gazette, Le Devoir, Voir (Montréal, Québec City), Halifax Chronicle-Herald, Vancouver Georgia Straight, Kitchener-Waterloo Record, Philadelphia Inquirer, Winnipeg Free Press

==== Single references ====
New York Village Voice (1991), Edmonton Journal (1991), Mannheimer Morgan (2007), Rhein-Neckar Zeitung (2007), Die Reihnpalz (1995), Rochester Democrat and Chronicle Union Times (1993), Quebec City Le Soleil (1996), The Glasgow Scotsman (1999), AF of M International Musician (1999), Sydney Morning Herald (2000), Copenhagen Berlingske Tilden (2001), Bolzano Corriere delle Apli (2001), Bolzanno Il Mattino (2001), Dublin Irish Times (1998), Baseler Agenda (2004), Sherbrooke La Tribune (2005)

=== Programmes ===
Huddersfield Contemporary Music Festival, INA-GRM (Radio-France), Winnipeg Symphony Orchestra New Music Festival, festival international de musique actuelle de Victoriaville, Bang on a Can Festival, Relâche ensemble, Esprit Orchestra, Orchestre symphonique de Montréal, Orchestre symphonique de Laval, G.M.E.M. (Marseille), Interpretations Series (New York City), The Kitchen, Auros New Music Ensemble, New Ear Ensemble, Conseil québécois de la musique – Prix OPUS, Festival Les Coups de Théâtre (Montreal), OUTPUT Festival, CALARTS REDCAT Theatre (Los Angeles), Edmonton Jazz City, Festival international de jazz de Montréal.

=== Books ===
- = Encyclopedia of Music in Canada
- The Blackwell Guide to Recorded Contemporary Music by Brian Morton ISBN 0-631-20138-6 and ISBN 978-0-631-20138-0

=== Record catalogues ===
- Justin Time Records (1988–2000)
- Ambiances Magnétiques (2002–present)

=== Archives ===
- Innovations en concert
- Bradyworks
- Canadian New Music Network
- Canadian Music Centre
- Music Gallery archives
- Canadian Broadcasting Corporation archives
- Société Radio-Canada archives
- British Broadcasting Corporation archives
- Radio-France (INA-GRM) archives
