= The Equalizer 2 (soundtrack) =

The Equalizer 2 (Original Motion Picture Soundtrack)

Film score by Harry Gregson-Williams
- Released: July 20, 2018
- Studios: Sony Scoring Stage, Sony Pictures Studios, Culver City; The Village, Los Angeles
- Genre: Film score
- Length: 42:28
- Label: Sony Classical
- Producer: Harry Gregson-Williams

Harry Gregson-Williams chronology
Early Man (2018)	The Equalizer 2 (2018)	The Meg (2018)

The Equalizer 2 (Original Motion Picture Soundtrack) is the film score composed by Harry Gregson-Williams to the 2018 film The Equalizer 2 directed by Antoine Fuqua. A sequel to The Equalizer (2014), which was based on the TV series of the same name, as well as the second installment of The Equalizer trilogy, the film stars Denzel Washington reprising his role as Robert McCall. The film score is composed by Harry Gregson-Williams and was released through Sony Classical Records on July 20, 2018.

== Development ==
Gregson-Williams returned to score music for The Equalizer 2 after scoring the predecessor. The composer attributed that the film has a more emotional storyline, recalling his music sittings with Fuqua, "There is a scene where Denzel's character is trying to save this young boy from the criminality and drugs. This is not the focus of the film, but it shows the humanitarian side of his character. He actually cares about what is going on. Denzel is yelling in this poor boy's face trying to make him understand he has a choice to not go down the road of drugs and guns." He added that this scene was the reason why Denzel wanted to do this story; Gregson-Williams opined that the music he wrote for the scene was very different than the music he wrote for the first film. He composed the score within a month-long duration and recorded at the Sony Scoring Stage in Sony Pictures Studios and The Village, where he also mixed the soundtrack. The recording process went on for three months.

== Release ==
The film featured an original song "Animal Sauvage" performed by Brainpower, featuring Pharoahe Monch, Pitcho Womba Konga and STIX. It was released on July 18, 2018. Sony Classical Records released the soundtrack on July 20.

== Track listing ==
No.	Title	Length
1.	"McCall's Return"	4:39
2.	"Boston By Day"	1:19
3.	"Boston By Night"	1:24
4.	"Five Stars for Amy"	2:31
5.	"Stories of Sorrow"	2:34
6.	"McCall Mourns Susan"	1:56
7.	"Destroying the Evidence"	3:47
8.	"Five Pounds of Pressure"	3:38
9.	"The Confession"	5:49
10.	"Behind the Bookcase"	4:25
11.	"The Bridge"	2:43
12.	"Storm Hunt"	2:49
13.	"Top of the Tower"	3:19
14.	"Who Are You?"	1:35
Total length:		42:28

== Reception ==
Filmtracks wrote "Overall, the shorter, 43-minute album for this score is surely sufficient and can be combined by concept enthusiasts with the first movie's soundtrack for a seamless experience. For other listeners, there's little reason to explore this conservatively rendered, often depressing thriller score, as even the thematic highlights offer no memorably unique characteristics." "The Equalizer II provides a very enjoyable action drama that has a touch of warmth deep down to make it a memorable and effective score." Peter Debruge of Variety called the score "exciting", and Todd McCarthy of The Hollywood Reporter called it as "bombastic".

== Personnel ==
Credits adapted from liner notes:

- Music composer and producer – Harry Gregson-Williams
- Music arrangements – Justin Burnett, Stephanie Economou
- Recording – Dennis S. Sands
- Mixing – Al Clay
- Mastering – Lurssen Mastering
- Music editor – Mark Jan Wlodarkiewicz, Paul Thomason
- Music production supervisor – Monica Zierhut
- Technical assistance – Adam Olmsted, Alvin Wee
- Copyist – BTW Productions, Booker White
- Booklet editor and design – WLP Ltd.

Orchestra

- Orchestrator – Ladd McIntosh
- Conductor – Harry Gregson-Williams, Stephanie Economou
- Contractor – Peter Rotter
- Concertmaster – Tereza Stanislav
- Cello – Adrienne Woods, Armen Ksajikian, Ben Lash, Christina Soule, Dennis Karmazyn, Eric Byers, Evgeny Tonkha, Jacob Braun, Michael Kaufman, Michelle Rearick, Paula Hochhalter, Ross Gasworth, Simone Vitucci, Trevor Handy, Helen Altenbach, Steve Erdody
- Double bass – Christian Kollgaard, Edward Meares, Michael Valerio, Stephen Dress, Thomas Harte, Nico Abondolo
- Viola – Alma Fernandez, Carolyn Riley, Corinne Sobolewski, David Walther, Zach Dellinger, Jonathan Moerschel, Karoline Menezes Smith, Laura Pearson, Matthew Funes, Meredith Crawford, Michael Nowak, Michael Whitson, Nikki Shorts, Robert Brophy, Shawn Mann, Brian Dembow
- Violin – Alyssa Park, Amy Hershberger, Ana Landauer, Benjamin Powell, Bruce Dukov, Charlie Bisharat, Darius Campo, Eun-Mee Ahn, Grace Oh, Helen Nightengale, Irina Voloshina, Jessica Guideri, Lisa Liu, Luanne Homzy, Marc Sazer, Maya Magub, Natalie Leggett, Serena McKinney, Julie Gigante

Soloists

- Electric cello – Martin Tillman
- Cello – Peter Gregson, Steve Erdody
- Guitar – George Doering, Peter DiStefano
- Piano – Harry Gregson-Williams

== Accolades ==
Award	Date of ceremony	Category	Recipient(s)	Result	Ref(s)
Hollywood Music in Media Awards	November 14, 2018	Best Original Song – Feature Film	"Animal Savage" from The Equalizer 2 – written by Gertjan Mulder; performed by Brainpower, featuring Pharoahe Monch, Pitcho Womba Konga and STIX	Nominated	
