= Something in the Water =

Something in the Water may refer to:

- Something in the Water (1944 film), a Hungarian drama film
- Something in the Water (2008 film), an Australian documentary
- Something in the Water (2024 film), a British survival thriller film
- "Something in the Water" (Brooke Fraser song)
- "Something in the Water" (Carrie Underwood song)
- "Something in the Water" (Tom Grennan song)
- Somethin' in the Water, a 2001 album by Jeffrey Steele
  - "Somethin' in the Water", the album's title track, later recorded by Little Feat on their album Join the Band
- "Something in the Water", a song by Terri Clark from her album Just the Same

== See also ==
- There's Something in the Water, a 2019 Canadian documentary
- It's in the Water, a 1997 independent film comedy about homosexuality in a small Texas town
