= A Shaun the Sheep Movie: Farmageddon (soundtrack) =

2019 film soundtrack album

A Shaun the Sheep Movie: Farmageddon (Original Motion Picture Soundtrack)

Soundtrack album by Tom Howe
- Released: 18 October 2019
- Genres: Film score; film soundtrack
- Length: 68:08
- Label: Milan
- Producer: Tom Howe

Tom Howe chronology
Early Man (2018)	A Shaun the Sheep Movie: Farmageddon (2019)	Charming (2019)

A Shaun the Sheep Movie: Farmageddon (Original Motion Picture Soundtrack) is the soundtrack album to the 2019 Aardman Animations film A Shaun the Sheep Movie: Farmageddon, which is the sequel to Shaun the Sheep Movie (2015) and is based on the British claymation television series Shaun the Sheep. The film score is composed by Tom Howe and released through Milan Records on 18 October 2019.

== Development ==
In November 2018, it was announced that Tom Howe would be composing the score for A Shaun the Sheep Movie: Farmageddon, replacing Ilan Eshkeri who composed the predecessor. While Howe was working on the overdubs for Aardman's Early Man, the producer Paul Kewley invited him for lunch where he had showed his earlier storyboards on his laptop. Kewley said that the team wanted the score to be something symphonic on the lines of the science fiction action films of the 1980s and John Williams scores, which intrigued Howe as he was grown up with the kind of the films. After giving the nod, Howe composed few potential themes which he sent to Kewley and was eventually hired for the film.

Since the film does not have dialogue, the music had to be present in the early stages, where he "would go away to write music but then a character [he] was writing for might disappear from the script, or a scene [he] was working on would get reworked and maybe chopped in half". Eventually, it took him around 18 months to write five-and-a-half hours of music. Howe considered the process to be collaborative as a composing suite was specially built at the Aardman heardquarters in Bristol, which allowed Howe to work with the editors in the next room. For every 10–12 weeks, Howe would fly to Los Angeles on every Sunday night to compose and discuss with the potential themes in his ideas with the director and editor. The Farmageddon theme was decided early on which led Howe to write 10–15 minute versions of the suites ranging from different moods: fast-paced, funny and emotional, which editor Sim Evan-Jones took to edit those pieces appropriately and that worked well.

Besides the score, the film also featured original songs: "Lazy" by Kylie Minogue and the Vaccines, "Everything is Better" by Kieran Shudall of the Circa Waves band, performing with his wife Heather, "I Can't Be My Old Self Forever" by Jorja Smith, "Renegade Sheep" by Rat Boy and a remix of "Shaun the Sheep (Life's a Treat)" by Toddla T featuring Nadia Rose.

== Reception ==
Mini Anthikkad Chhibber of The Hindu wrote "The music composed by Tom Howe is lovely. ‘Lazy,’ the theme tune is performed by The Vaccines and Kylie Minogue, there is a remix of the series theme and an original song, ‘I Can’t Be My Old Self Forever’ by Jorja Smith." Guy Lodge of Variety wrote "Only a soundtrack heavy on pop tracks from British artists ranging from Jorja Smith to the Chemical Brothers sounds out of place, their slick wordiness more disruptive to the film’s unworldly Play-Doh Chaplin spirit than Tom Howe’s infectiously buoyant score." Norman Wilner of Now wrote "Tom Howe’s lively score provides pacing and feeling".

Tess Milligan of Grok Magazine wrote "Given the complete absence of the spoken word, the film’s score really shines. Tom Howe, the film’s composer, has also produced the music for television shows such as The Great British Bake Off and Locked up Abroad. But now he brings his talents to the animated world of Shaun the Sheep, accentuating the film’s moments of humour and sadness. Audiences will find that there are scenes in the film that will make them genuinely feel sad for the homesick Lu-La, and Howe’s score deserves a lot of credit for that. Howe told Cineworld that the movie’s producer wanted a score reminiscent of the work of the brilliant John Williams but he delivers something much better. The score is simple, original and emphasises the best parts of the film."

== Track listing ==
No.	Title	Artist(s)	Length
1.	"Everything Is Better"	Kieran Shudall; Heather Shudall	2:44
2.	"Lazy"	Kylie Minogue; The Vaccines	3:29
3.	"I Can't Be My Old Self Forever"	Jorja Smith	4:20
4.	"Shaun the Sheep (Life's a Treat)" (Farmageddon Remix)	Toddla T feat. Nadia Rose	1:50
5.	"Renegade Sheep"	Rat Boy	1:46
6.	"Prologue & Alien Arrival"		2:35
7.	"Back On the Farm"		1:23
8.	"The Barn & Meeting Lu-La"		2:41
9.	"Lu-La Meets the Flock"		2:44
10.	"Tractor Joyride"		2:01
11.	"Lu-La's Powers"		1:20
12.	"Going On a Mission"		1:09
13.	"Agent Red & the Hazmats"		2:01
14.	"Basement Ideas & Farmageddon"		1:16
15.	"The Supermarket & the Sugar Rush"		2:39
16.	"Bitzer Directs the Construction"		2:14
17.	"Lu-La's Memory"		3:15
18.	"UFOs Caught – 0001"		1:42
19.	"Sneaking Around the Base"		1:52
20.	"Waking Up & Being Chased"		2:41
21.	"Flashback & a Spaceship Cras"		3:24
22.	"No Way Home"		1:37
23.	"A Plan Under Pressure"		2:29
24.	"At the Crank"		1:48
25.	"The Mech Suit"		1:24
26.	"Parent Arrival"		1:57
27.	"The Tower Chase"		3:00
28.	"Time To Go Home"		2:09
29.	"Farmageddon End Credits"		4:38
Total length:			68:08

== Additional music ==
The following other songs that are not featured in the soundtrack, but included in the film are:

- "Real Life" by Tom Walker
- "Blow the Wind Southerly" by Mike Smith
- "Also sprach Zarathustra Op. 30" by Richard Strauss
- "Close Encounters of the Third Kind" by John Williams
- "Out of Control" (Farmageddon Remix) by The Chemical Brothers
- "The X-Files Theme" by Mark Snow
- "The Blue Danube Waltz" by Johann Strauss II
- "Forever Autumn" by Justin Hayward
- "House of Fun" by Mike Smith
- "Things Can Only Get Better" by Mike Smith

== Accolades ==
Award	Date of ceremony	Category	Nominee	Result
Hollywood Music in Media Awards	27 January 2021	Best Original Score in an Animated Film	Tom Howe	Nominated
Music + Sound Awards UK	21 July 2020	Best Original Composition in a Feature Film	Tom Howe	Nominated
World Soundtrack Awards	24 October 2020	Discovery of the Year	Tom Howe	Nominated
