= De Grussa =

De Grussa is a surname. Notable people with the surname include:

- Colin de Grussa (born 1973), Australian politician
- Michael de Grussa (born 1982), Australian singer-songwriter
