= Alexander Archer =

Alexander or Alex Archer may refer to:

- Alexander Archer (banker) (1828–1890), Australian banker
- Alex Archer (ice hockey) (1908–1979), British ice hockey
- Alex Archer (musician) (born 1970), American-born Australian musician

== See also ==
- Archer Alexander (1816–1879), formerly enslaved American man who served as the model for the "emancipated slave" in the Emancipation Memorial
