= Love Is My Velocity =

Love Is My Velocity Records
- Founded: 2006
- Genre: Various
- Country of origin: Australia
- Location: Perth, Western Australia
- Official website: Love Is My Velocity website

Love Is My Velocity is a Perth, Australia-based independent record label. Originally started as an indie club night in 2003, it became a record label representing mainly Perth bands in 2006. Love Is My Velocity is Helen McLean, Keong Woo, Katie Lenanton and Matt Giles.

Until August 2007 the label exclusively released split 7 inch vinyl singles containing one song each from two upcoming bands. The first was "Bird" / "City Walls and Empires" by The Bank Holidays and Institut Polaire, the second was "Wow" / "It's All the Same to Me" by the Tucker B's and Airport City Shuffle, the third was "Holidayz" / "Hard on a Man" by Josh Fontaine and Joe Bludge, and the fourth and most recent single was "Hot Property" / "I've Got Your Soul" by 7 Day Weekend and Sugar Army. "City Walls and Empires" went on to win WAM song of the year 2006. In August Love is My Velocity released its first CD album by Perth band Bamodi. They plan to release their second CD-LP by the Burton Cool Suit in October and their third in early 2008 by Josh Fontaine.

In May 2007 the label expanded into publishing, releasing the Love is My Velocity Cookbook, a guide to Perth music and art made within the cookbook format. The cookbook features recipes provided by 48 local Perth bands and artwork by 60 emerging artists. Two years later the second Love Is My Velocity Cook Book was released.

== Artists ==
- Institut Polaire
- The Bank Holidays
- Tucker B's
- Adem K
- Airport City Shuffle
- Josh Fontaine
- Joe Bludge
- 7 Day Weekend
- Sugar Army
- Bamodi
- Burton Cool Suit
- Stina Thomas
- The Tigers
- Ghost Drums

== See also ==
- List of record labels
