= Popfrenzy =

Australian record label

- Founded: 1999
- Founder: Christopher Shang Kai Wu
- Distributor: Universal Music Group
- Genre: Various
- Country of origin: Australia
- Location: Surry Hills, New South Wales
- Official website: www.popfrenzy.com.au

Popfrenzy is an independent record label and touring-events agency created by Chris Wu based in Sydney, Australia.

The agency commenced in 1999, putting on various underground parties/nights. Between 2000 and 2006, they booked a number of Sydney clubs and venues, including the Spanish, Mandarin, Taxi and Teachers Clubs.

In 2003, Popfrenzy started to bring overseas acts to Australia, as well establishing their own record label. The first two releases were from Camera Obscura and Les Savy Fav.

They also started and ran an independent record store between mid-2005 and mid-2006 in Surry Hills, Sydney, called Gifted Records. In 2006 Popfrenzy issued a music magazine, Moss, edited by Tommy Thran, but it was short-lived.

In 2012 Popfrenzy joined Cooperative Music in order to be able to promote domestic artists internationally. As part of the deal, Universal Music Group took on the label's distribution. The label had previously been distributed by Inertia since early 2009.

In 2014 they announced an arrangement with Béchamel Records to start releasing vinyl records, with the first release being Brisbane band, Per Purpose.

== Notable artists ==
- Best Coast
- Deerhunter
- Neon Indian
- Metronomy
- Ty Segall
- Blonde Redhead
- HEALTH
- Electrelane
- Matt & Kim
- Wire
- High Places
- Times New Viking
- Marnie Stern
- Broadcast
- The Drums
- Gruff Rhys
- Camera Obscura
- The Clientele
- Slow Club
- Even As We Speak
- Xiu Xiu
- Patrick Wolf
- Institut Polaire
- Les Savy Fav
- The Rogers Sisters
- Saturday Looks Good To Me
- The Organ
- Q and Not U
- Jeff Hanson
- Crooked Fingers
- Smoosh
- Need New Body
- Calvin Johnson
- The Blow
- The Gossip
- The Robot Ate Me
- Day Ravies

== See also ==
- List of record labels
