= Adam Said Galore =

Australian indie rock band

- Origin: Perth, Western Australia, Australia
- Genres: Alternative rock, indie rock
- Years active: 1994–present
- Label: Redline
- Members: Matt Maguire; Andrew Ryan; Simon Struthers
- Past members: Michael Lake; Geoff Symons
- Website: adamsaidgalore.8m.com

Adam Said Galore are a three piece indie rock band from Perth, Western Australia. Formed in 1994, the founding mainstays are Matt Maguire on drums, Andrew Ryan on guitar and lead vocals, and Simon Struthers on bass guitar. The group have released two albums, The Driver Is Red (12 March 2001) and Of Lost Roads (11 November 2002).

== History ==
Adam Said Galore were formed in 1993, by Michael Lake on guitar, Matt Maguire on drums, Andrew Ryan on guitar and lead vocals, and Simon Struthers on bass guitar, in the Perth suburb of Greenwood. At the time they were high school students and their first gig was at a high school, performing a mixture of covers – including Radiohead's "Creep" – and originals. As all members were under age, in accordance with Western Australia's liquor and gaming laws, it was three years before they were able to play their first licensed performances.

The band gained wider coverage in 1997 when their song, "Balancing on a Pin", won the national Push competition on the Australian Broadcasting Corporation's TV program, Recovery, where unsigned bands sent in a video clip, with the prize being a live appearance on Recovery and at the Push Over Festival in Melbourne. The band's early influences include Pavement, Polvo, Monk, Sun Ra, Tortoise and Palace. These influences are apparent on their 1997 debut seven-track extended play, Domino Comfort, which was recorded in the disused former Fremantle Prison, Western Australia. It was released on Current Records and included "Balancing on a Pin". The EP peaked at No. 1 on the Perth Top 10.

In 1999 Michael Lake left Adam Said Galore and was replaced by Geoff Symons (who also played alongside Lake and Struthers in another Perth band, Mukaizake) on guitar. In March 2001 Adam Said Galore released their first full-length album, The Driver is Red, through Redline Records. It was recorded in one week at Loop Studio in Perth, with Chicago-based sound engineer, Casey Rice, who had previously worked with Tortoise and Liz Phair. The band met Rice whilst supporting Tortoise on their tour of Australia, and invited him to Perth to produce the album. On the recording process, Maguire recalled:

"Laying down our songs live in such a short time period created an atmosphere of mission like intensity and focus, it also created some very manic moments which were captured and will remain authentic to this recording".

The album reached No. 12 on the AIR Album Charts in April 2001. Dexter Fletcher of DOA: For the Love of Music website felt they made "music in the post-rock vein of Don Caballero, Codeine, and Polvo, combining the intricate guitar and occasional rocking out tendencies ... with quieter moments that bring to mind the work of Palace".

In November 2002 the band's released its third studio album, Of Lost Roads, which was produced by the band's bassist, Struthers. In a review of the album on Australian Music Online, the reviewer states the album is "simultaneously confronting, piercingly melancholic, utterly compelling" and "comes the closest yet to capturing the dark spirit that fuses this band together." The album was included in the Triple J list of best albums of 2002.

In 2003 Maguire won a WAMi Award for 'Most Popular Local Original Drummer'. At the 2005 WAMi Awards Ryan was nominated for "Best Male Vocalist' and Struthers for 'Best Record Producer/Engineer'. In 2009 Ryan and Macguire were both nominated for WAMi Awards, with Macguire winning the 'Best Drummer' category. Ryan and Macguire were nominated again for 'Best Guitarist' and 'Best Drummer' respectively at the 2010 WAMi Awards. Ryan received a third nomination for 'Best Guitarist' at the 2011 WAMi Awards.

Although not a full time band, Adam Said Galore have continued to play select shows over the preceding years.

Ryan has become a part owner of Mojos Bar (an original music venue in Fremantle). He also presents a weekly program on local radio station RTRFM. Struthers has continued to produce records for a number of local and Australian artists and at the 2005 WAMi Awards, Struthers was nominated for Best Record Producer/Engineer. He has also opened Forensic Audio, a mastering studio located in Leederville, Perth. Maguire was a member of the Tucker B's for a while and now spends most of his time playing in Perth band Schvendes.

In 2009 through to 2010 Ryan, Struthers and Maguire were recording and creating new tunes in their Little Fort studio. In November 2013 Ryan won the Golden WAMi Award for "his contribution to the WA music scene as a venue manager (Mojo’s), promoter (Cool Perth Nights) and a musician (Long Lost Brothers, Fall Electric, Adam Said Galore)".

== Touring ==
Adam Said Galore have toured nationally across Australia and have supported amongst others - Palace, Tortoise, Sandpit, Tren Brothers, Trans Am, The Kill Devil Hills, Mogwai, Something for Kate.

The band has performed live on Recovery and Triple J's 'Australian Music Show' and 'Live at the Wireless'. They have also performed at numerous festivals in Australia.

== Band members ==
=== Current members ===
- Andrew Ryan - guitar, lead vocals
- Simon Struthers - bass
- Matt Maguire - drums

=== Former members ===
- Michael Lake - guitar (1994-1999)
- Geoff Symons - guitar (1999-2006)

== Discography ==
=== Albums ===
| Title | Details |
|---|---|
| The Driver is Red | Released: 12 March 2001; Label: Redline (RED002); Format: CD |
| Of Lost Roads | Released: 11 November 2002; Label: Redline (RED013); Format: CD |

=== Extended plays ===
| Title | Details |
|---|---|
| Domino Comfort | Released: 24 November 1997; Label: Current (raison 017); Format: CD |

== Awards ==
=== West Australian Music Industry Awards ===
The Western Australian Music Industry Awards (commonly known as WAMis) are annual awards presented to the local contemporary music industry, put on by the Western Australian Music Industry Association Inc (WAM). Adam Said Galore won two awards.

| Year | Nominee / work | Award | Result (wins only) |
|---|---|---|---|
| 2003 | Matt Maguire (Adam Said Galore) | Most Popular Local Original Drummer | Won |
| 2009 | Matt Maguire (Adam Said Galore) | Most Popular Local Original Drummer | Won |

== Side Projects ==
- Matt Maguire also plays drums for the Tucker B's and Schvendes
- Simon Struthers has also produced a number of other records for Perth bands and musicians, including Suburban Kid for Kevin Mitchell (a.k.a. Bob Evans) in 2003, the Tucker B's Kill Devil Hills, Apricot Rail, Umpire and Mukaizake.
- Simon Struthers and Geoff Symons played together with former band member, Michael Lake, in the band Mukaizake. These members have formed a new band, Umpire.
- Andrew Ryan also plays with Tristen Parr, Dave Parkin & Pete Evans in Fall Electric who have in October 2012 completed their second album due for release in 2013. Andrew is longtime musical collaborator with Felicity Groom having worked with all her releases. Andrew's newest project The Long Lost Brothers is a songwriting project with The Tucker Bs Matt Rudas, Simon Struthers & Mitch MacDonald are players in this band.

== Included in ==
- Something in the water, WBMC, 2009 - 2009 documentary that includes the history of Perth music scene, including Adam Said Galore
