= The Equalizer =

American spy thriller media franchise

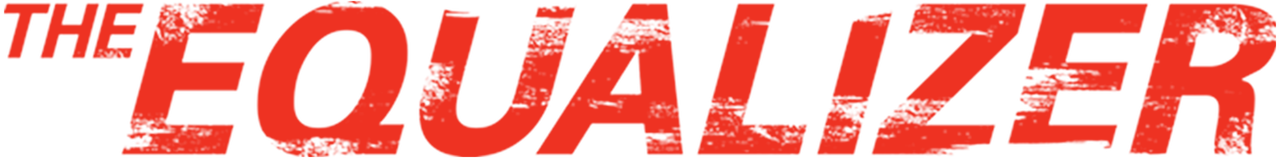
- Created by: Michael Sloan; Richard Lindheim
- Original work: The Equalizer (1985–1989)
- Owners: NBCUniversal; (Comcast) (television shows); Columbia Pictures; (Sony Pictures) (films)
- Years: 1985–present

Films and television
- Film(s): The Equalizer (2014); The Equalizer 2 (2018); The Equalizer 3 (2023)
- Television series: The Equalizer (1985–1989); The Equalizer (2021–2025)

Audio
- Soundtrack(s): The Equalizer; The Equalizer 2; The Equalizer 3

The Equalizer is an American vigilante action thriller multimedia franchise initially co-created by Michael Sloan and Richard Lindheim. It originated with a CBS television series from 1985 to 1989 starring Edward Woodward. The concept was thereafter rebooted twice with a trilogy of movies (The Equalizer in 2014, The Equalizer 2 in 2018, and The Equalizer 3 in 2023) starring Denzel Washington and a re-imagined 2021 television series, also on CBS, starring Queen Latifah as Robyn McCall. Original co-creator Michael Sloan has written a series of novels featuring Robert McCall, with the first volume published in 2014.

The franchise centers on Robert McCall (and Robyn McCall), a former intelligence agent who uses their skills to exact justice on behalf of innocent people, sometimes also dealing with people from their past in covert operations who want to pull them back in or settle old scores.

== Television series ==
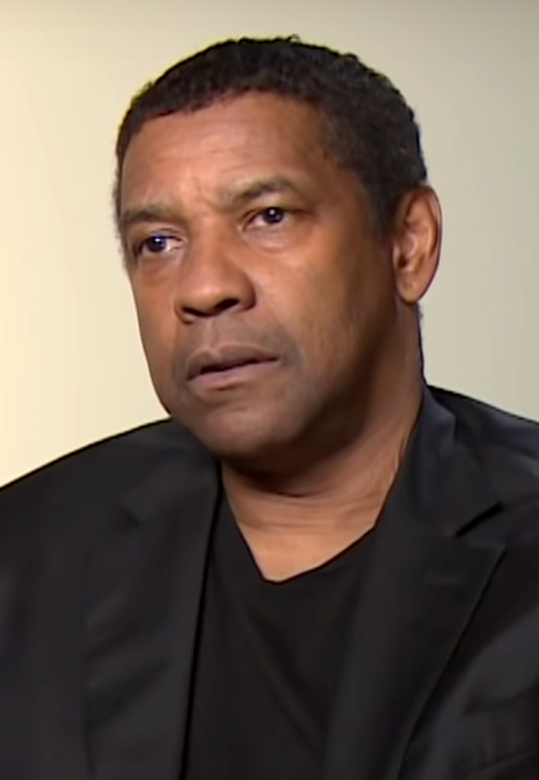
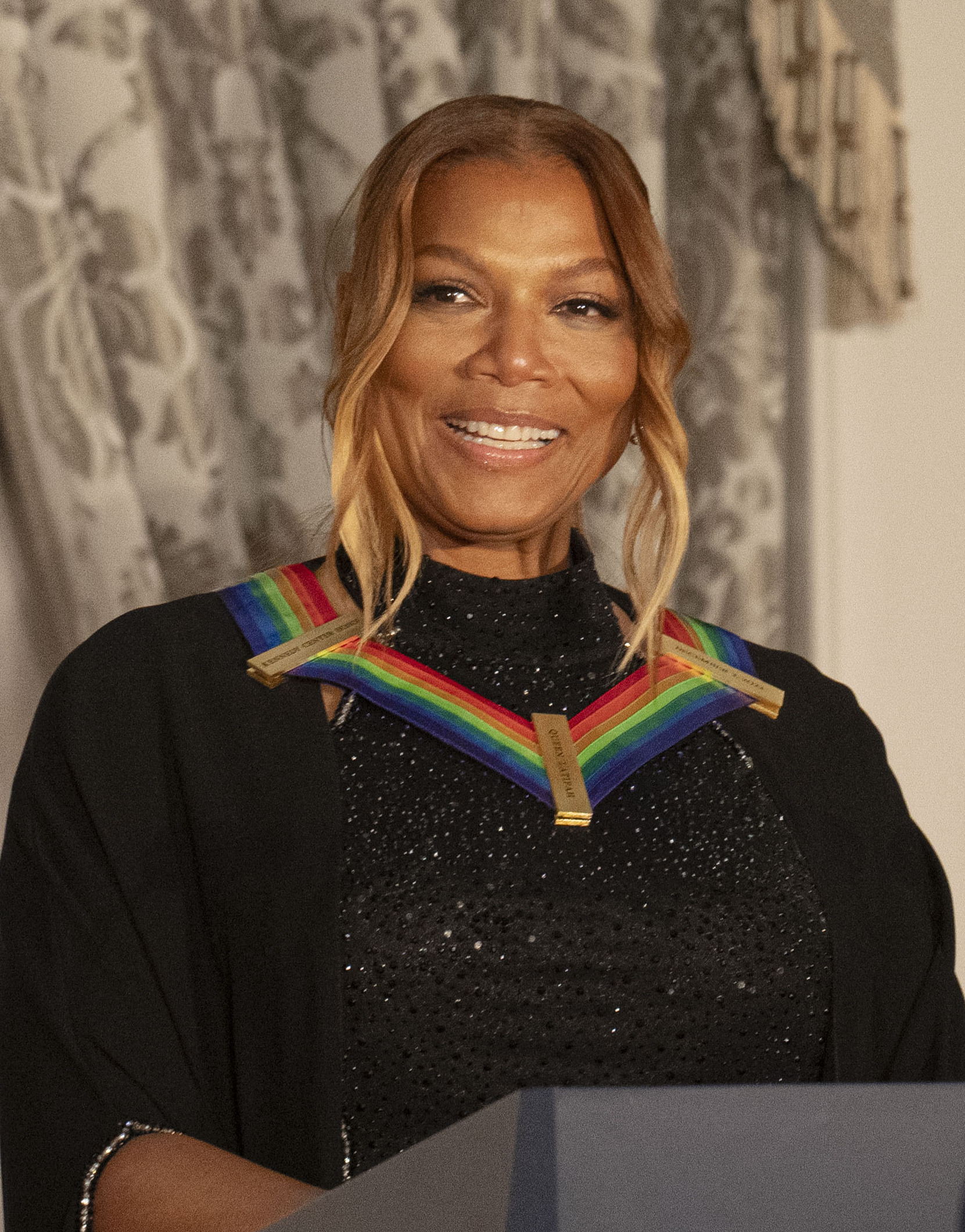
Actors who have starred as McCall in The Equalizer media: Edward Woodward in the 1985 TV series, Denzel Washington in the 2010s films, and Queen Latifah in the 2021 series

=== Original series (1985–1989) ===
The original show ran for four seasons of 22 episodes each. It was initially renewed for a fifth season (causing Keith Szarabajka to turn down a role on Midnight Caller). The show was later canceled, though, due to a row between CBS and Universal Studios over the renewal of Murder, She Wrote. In The Story of The Equalizer, created for the DVD box set, executive producer Coleman Luck also stated that Universal requested a script for a crossover episode with Magnum, P.I. despite the objections of the crew due to the vastly different tones of the two shows. Ultimately, the crossover did not happen, and the episode was rewritten as "Beyond Control".

The show's theme music was created by musician Stewart Copeland, his first effort at theme music composition in what would become a lengthy career in that field. The track is called "Busy Equalizing". An extended version appears on his album The Equalizer and Other Cliff Hangers.

=== Reboot series (2021–2025) ===
In November 2019, CBS announced that a reboot was in development with Queen Latifah in the lead role as Robyn McCall. Andrew Marlowe and Terri Miller were to serve as showrunners with Latifah herself as an executive producer. On January 27, 2020, CBS ordered a pilot for the new version. The series was among the 14 pilots ordered by CBS in February 2020 and was fast tracked to series the following March, as they were unable to film their pilots where Universal Television was shut down because of the COVID-19 pandemic.

On May 8, 2020, CBS picked up the series, and it premiered on February 7, 2021, after Super Bowl LV.

The series was renewed for a second season, and ran for a total of five seasons, ending in 2025.

== Films ==
=== The Equalizer (2014) ===
In June 2010, Russell Crowe was reportedly looking to bring The Equalizer to the big screen and to be directed by Paul Haggis, with Crowe attached to play Robert McCall.

In December 2011, Denzel Washington was announced to star in the title role of the film version, to be financed by Sony Pictures Entertainment and Escape Artists. Director Antoine Fuqua came on board to direct on March 21, 2013, reuniting him with Washington after their successful collaboration on the 2001 Oscar-winning film Training Day. Chloë Grace Moretz was announced as a co-star on May 10, 2013; Anna Kendrick, Kelly Macdonald, and Nina Dobrev were also considered. On May 31, 2013, Melissa Leo was cast in the film. Leo previously worked with Washington in the 2012 film Flight, and with Fuqua in Olympus Has Fallen (2013). Coincidentally, Leo actually guest-starred in a season-one episode of the original Equalizer television series titled "The Defector", in which she portrayed the daughter of a former Soviet agent, who enlists McCall's help to defect to the United States. Marton Csokas was cast to play the villain on May 17.

The Equalizer grossed $101.5 million in North America and $90.8 million in other territories for a worldwide gross of $192.3 million, against a net production budget of $55 million.

=== The Equalizer 2 (2018) ===
On February 24, 2014, seven months before the release of The Equalizer, Sony Pictures Entertainment and Escape Artists announced they were planning a sequel, with Richard Wenk penning the script again. In early October 2014, Antoine Fuqua stated that sequel to the film would be made only if audiences and Denzel Washington wanted it. He said he was an interesting character, and that the sequel could have more of an international flavor.

On April 22, 2015, Sony officially announced a sequel, with Washington returning to his role as vigilante Robert McCall. Fuqua's returning was not yet confirmed. In September 2016, producer Todd Black revealed that the script of the film was complete, and that Fuqua would return to direct, with shooting set to begin in September 2017.

The Equalizer 2 grossed $102.1 million in the United States and Canada, and $88.3 million in other territories, for a total worldwide gross of $190.4 million, against a production budget of $62 million.

=== The Equalizer 3 (2023) ===
A third film with Washington and director Antoine Fuqua returning, was filmed in October 2022, on the Amalfi Coast in Italy. The film was released on September 1, 2023.

=== Future ===
In November 2024, Washington announced that he had agreed to perform in two new movies: The Equalizer 4 and The Equalizer 5.

== Novels ==
During the original series run, three novelisations were penned by author David Deutsch: The Equalizer adapted the pilot episode and "The Children's Song", To Even the Odds was based on "The Defector" and "Back Home", and Blood and Wine was taken from the two-part episode of the same name.

A series of novels featuring Robert McCall has been written by the original co-creator Michael Sloan. The first is simply entitled The Equalizer published in 2014, followed by Killed in Action: An Equalizer Novel, which was released in 2018. The novels are a modern reimagining of the original series and focus on McCall leaving the Company and eventually becoming a private investigator in New York. It also features a number of original recurring characters from the television series, such as Mickey Kostmayer, Control, and Scott McCall. A third novel, Equalizer: Requiem was released in 2020.

=== List of novels ===
- The Equalizer (2014) – by Michael Sloan
- Killed in Action: An Equalizer Novel (2018) – by Michael Sloan
- Equalizer: Requiem (2020) – by Michael Sloan
- Knight Errant – An Equalizer Novel (2023) – by Michael Sloan
