= The Meg (soundtrack) =

The Meg (Original Motion Picture Soundtrack)

Film score by Harry Gregson-Williams
- Released: August 3, 2018
- Studio: Synchron Stage Vienna
- Genre: Film score
- Length: 51:04
- Label: WaterTower Music
- Producer: Harry Gregson-Williams

Harry Gregson-Williams chronology
The Equalizer 2 (2018)	The Meg (2018)	Penguins (2019)

The Meg (Original Motion Picture Soundtrack) is the film score soundtrack composed by Harry Gregson-Williams to the 2018 film The Meg directed by Jon Turteltaub, starring Jason Statham. The score was released under WaterTower Music on August 3, 2018.

== Development ==
Harry Gregson-Williams noted that the first edit he worked on did not have a shark (which would be created later using computer graphics) owing to the long delay in post production. Gregson-Williams added "I could tell how the shark moves in the water and its speed, but as far as distinct details, they didn't arrive until very late in the process." He recalled on his discussions with Turteltaub at the editing room, denying any connection with Jaws (1975) and noted that Jason Statham's involvement helped in the film stepping out of the shadow of that film.

Gregson-Williams ensured the Megalodon had its own unique theme, which is ancient-sounding, in addition to a conventionally structured theme. Since the film is set partly in Asia and being a Chinese co-production, he wanted the score to reflect Asian influences with traditional Chinese instrumentation. He employed a Singapore-based Chinese drum troupe which consisted of 24 players who were "utterly fantastic" and had them flown to Los Angeles and the recordings were done late at night.

He further developed a sonic motif which provided a signature to act as a warning call and invoke fear and suspense. He used the conch as an instrument, which was "both distinctive and ancient [and] offered a voice to the vast terror of a concealed underwater world. He recorded a variety of conches in all shapes and sizes, with a Los Angeles-based conch player and edited and manipulated those raw sounds and phrases, where he built a Kontakt instrument that sampled the finished phrases of the conch sounds. The score was recorded at the Synchron Stage in Vienna, Austria, during early 2018. Gregson-Williams conducted the score which was orchestrated by Alastair King.

== Release ==
WaterTower Music released the score on August 3, 2018, a week prior to the film's release.

== Track listing ==
No.	Title	Length
1.	"Sub Disaster"	4:16
2.	"Mana One"	1:32
3.	"A New World"	4:57
4.	"Jonas Descends"	3:12
5.	"Prehistoric Species"	2:41
6.	"Toshi's Sacrifice"	2:33
7.	"Non-Extinct"	1:46
8.	"Meiying Explores"	2:24
9.	"Even the Score"	2:10
10.	"Tracker"	2:42
11.	"Shark Cage"	3:52
12.	"You Saved Me"	0:56
13.	"Dr. Zhang"	2:35
14.	"We Have a Plan"	1:20
15.	"Pippin"	0:43
16.	"Beach Attack"	2:48
17.	"Jonas vs Meg"	5:56
18.	"To Our Friends"	4:41
Total length:		51:04

== Reception ==
Zanobard Reviews rated the soundtrack of The Meg with a score 5 out 10, and called it, "a little disappointing". He praised the main theme and the unusual instrumentation but complained that the theme was underused. He concludes "Gregson-Williams does a fantastic job with the wondrous side of this score, it is just a shame that the rest isn't as good." Filmtracks wrote, "The Meg strikes you as a score that is far more entertaining than it needed to be, though it won't last very long in memory anyway. The digital-only release includes no high-resolution download option, a sorry shame given the recording's dynamic specialty instruments. Still, if you can forgive the anonymous action and underplayed theme for the humans, there's a decent amount of material to appreciate in this competent work." Ben of Soundtrack Universe wrote, "The Meg is still a highly entertaining summer action score that is well worth exploring for fans of the genre. If only we could have gotten one of those great late 90's/early 2000's power anthems to complete the package." Demetrios Matheou of Screen International and Todd McCarthy of The Hollywood Reporter called it "thrilling" and "bombastic". Chris Bumbray of JoBlo.com wrote, "The score by Harry Gregson-Williams is also reliably good."

== Personnel ==
Credits adapted from WaterTower Music:

- Music composer and producer – Harry Gregson-Williams
- Additional music – Stephanie Economou
- Electric cello – Martin Tillman
- Guitar – Vivian Vilichkoff
- Chinese percussions – Drum Feng Singapore, Mike Chiang, Gao Yang
- Woodwinds – Charles Adelphia
- Orchestra – Synchron Stage Orchestra
- Orchestrations – Alastair King
- Orchestra conductor – Harry Gregson-Williams
- Concertmaster – Dimitrie Leivici
- Scoring engineer – Alvin Wee, Slamm Andrews
- Recording – Bernd Mazagg, Gao Yang
- Mixing – Al Clay
- Score editor – Adam Smalley, Allegra De Souza, Pete Snell
- Assistant score editor – Paul Thomason
- Music supervisor – Monica Zierhut
- Pro-tools operator – Martin Weismayr
- Copyist – Booker White
- Art direction – Sandeep Sriram
