= Heathen Songs =

Studio album by The Kill Devil Hills
- Released: August 2004
- Genre: Blues rock; Country music; Folk music
- Length: 48:41
- Label: Torn and Frayed; Reverberation Records
- Producer: Simon Struthers

The Kill Devil Hills chronology
Heathen Songs (2004)	The Drought (2006)

Heathen Songs is the debut album from The Kill Devil Hills, released in August 2004 and nationally on 7 February 2005 on the independent label Torn and Frayed and distributed by Reverberation Records.

The album was reissued by Shock Records on 11 June 2007.

The album was recorded, mixed and co-produced by Simon Struthers (Adam Said Galore).

== Track listing ==
1. "Changin' the Weather" - 5:05
2. "Gunslinger" - 4:13
3. "Angry Town" - 6:20
4. "The Heathen Song" - 4:22
5. "The People Stain" - 3:24
6. "Drinking Too Much" - 3:58
7. "6=5" - 5:02
8. "Tryin' To Forget About You" - 4:51
9. "Brown Skin" - 4:24
10. "Kill Devil Hills" - 3:44
11. "Changin' the Weather (reprise)" - 3:18

== Personnel ==
Lead Vocals, Backing Vocals, Acoustic Guitar, Electric Guitar, Slide Guitar – Steve Joines
Lead Vocals, Backing Vocals, Drums, Percussion, Xylophone – Steve Gibson
Lead Vocals, Backing Vocals, Steel Guitar, Acoustic Guitar, Piano – Brendon Humphries
Vocals, Harmonica, Piano, Organ, Banjo, Acoustic Guitar – Michael de Grussa
Double Bass – Justin Castley
Violin, Clarinet, Slide Guitar – Alex Archer
Guitar – Robin Mavrick
Backing Vocals – Selk Hastings

Mastered By – Jeremy Allom
Producer – Simon Struthers, The Kill Devil Hills
Recorded By, Mixed By – Simon Struthers

== Reviews ==
- Bang! Records
- Musicwire review
