= Early Man (soundtrack) =

2018 film soundtrack album

Early Man: (Original Motion Picture Soundtrack)

Film score by Harry Gregson-Williams and Tom Howe
- Released: 26 January 2018
- Recorded: 2017
- Venue: Abbey Road Studios
- Genre: Pop; rock
- Length: 60:57
- Label: Mercury

Harry Gregson-Williams chronology
Breath (2017)	Early Man (2018)	The Equalizer 2 (2018)

Tom Howe chronology
Professor Marston and the Wonder Women (2017)	Early Man (2018)	A Shaun the Sheep Movie: Farmageddon (2019)

Singles from Early Man (Original Motion Picture Soundtrack)
- 1. "Good Day" Released: 22 January 2018; 2. "Tiger Feet" Released: 28 February 2018

Early Man: (Original Motion Picture Soundtrack) is the soundtrack album composed by Harry Gregson-Williams and Tom Howe for the film of the same name and released by Mercury Records on 26 January 2018.

== Development ==
Harry Gregson-Williams, who previously scored Aardman's Chicken Run (2000), Flushed Away (2006) and Arthur Christmas (2011) was assigned to compose for Early Man. Since Gregson-Williams was already working on The Meg, he had a short duration to score the film which led him to recommend Tom Howe, who was working under his tutelage, to the producers so that he can be a co-composer in the film as he was interested in scoring animated films. Since the producers were unaware about him, they had to search through online regarding his filmography where his theme tune for the television baking competition series called The Great British Bake Off had impressed the producers and eventually agreed to his involvement.

Gregson-Williams and Howe split the work, where the former would compose the themes and Howe would develop and modify it. The scoring process began in late-October to early-November. Recording for the score commenced for a week at the Abbey Road Studios where the London Symphony Orchestra and London Voices performing the orchestra and choir respectively. The score utilizes instrumentations and orchestra which were considered to be strange, quirky and colorful highlighting the tone of the film. Howe also recalled that he utilized the sounds of spanking and caveman yelling sounds in order to be true to the story.

== Release ==
The score was released internationally by Mercury Records on 26 January 2018. The single "Good Day" was released ahead of the soundtrack on 22 January 2018. The single "Tiger Feet" was released a month after the soundtrack on 28 February 2018.

== Reception ==
Jonathan Broxton of Movie Music UK wrote "One of the main drawbacks of Early Man is the fact that, if you’re not listening closely, some of this clever thematic writing and intelligent dramatic application may slip past you. Although Dug’s theme is literally all over the score, it never quite grabs you by the ears and makes itself really memorable, which may result in some listeners finding the score a little generic, especially when compared to the outstanding thematic content in previous Aardman scores."

Andrew Collins of Radio Times described it an "energetic work by composers Harry Gregson-Williams and Tom Howe". James R Whitson of Animated Views wrote "The score by Harry Gregson-Williams and Tom Howe is very hit-or-miss: sometimes a great compliment to the on-screen action and other times not much better than just keeping quiet."

== Accolades ==
Award	Category	Nominee(s)	Result	Ref(s)
Annie Awards	Annie Award for Music in a Feature Production	Harry Gregson-Williams and Tom Howe	Nominated	
Hollywood Music in Media Awards	Original Song – Animated Film	"Good Day" – (written and performed by New Hope Club)	Nominated	

== Track listing ==
No.	Title	Producer(s)	Length
1.	"Good Day" (New Hope Club)		1:46
2.	"Hope" (The Vamps)	(Album Only)	3:15
3.	"Tiger Feet" (New Hope Club)		3:41
4.	"I Predict A Riot" (Kaiser Chiefs)		3:51
5.	"Dug's Theme" (Tom Howe and Harry Gregson-Williams)		2:40
6.	"Prehistoric Prologue" (Howe and Gregson-Williams)		3:42
7.	"In The Valley" (Howe and Gregson-Williams)		1:27
8.	"Meet Dug" (Gregson-Williams)		0:41
9.	"Meet The Tribe" (Howe and Gregson-Williams)		2:12
10.	"Rabbit Ambush" (Gregson-Williams and Howe)		1:02
11.	"Bronze Attack" (Gregson-Williams and Howe)		2:17
12.	"City Of Bronze" (Howe and Gregson-Williams)		1:04
13.	"Dug In Bronze Land" (Gregson-Williams and Howe)		0:51
14.	"Stadium Chase" (Gregson-Williams and Howe)		0:39
15.	"The Ancestral Call" (Howe and Gregson-Williams)		1:04
16.	"The Message Bird" (Gregson-Williams and Howe)		1:57
17.	"Giant Badlands Duck" (Howe and Gregson-Williams)		3:10
18.	"Stealing Footballs" (Gregson-Williams and Howe)		1:04
19.	"She Shoots, She Scores" (Gregson-Williams and Howe)		0:45
20.	"Challenge The Champions" (Howe and Gregson-Williams)		1:45
21.	"Harp Escape" (Gregson-Williams and Howe)		1:59
22.	"They're Not A Team" (Howe and Gregson-Williams)		0:46
23.	"Message From The Queen" (Howe and Gregson-Williams)		1:05
24.	"Foul Play" (Howe and Gregson-Williams)		1:18
25.	"Revelations In The Mine" (Gregson-Williams and Howe)		5:04
26.	"Royal Game Day" (Gregson-Williams and Howe)		1:40
27.	"Forfeiture And Humiliation" (Gregson-Williams and Howe)		2:10
28.	"Do It For The Valley" (Howe and Gregson-Williams)		2:08
29.	"The Final Game" (Howe and Gregson-Williams)		4:40
30.	"Chief Is Down" (Gregson-Williams and Howe)		0:54
31.	"Hognob In Goal" (Howe and Gregson-Williams)		3:34
32.	"Mousing Around" (Howe and Gregson-Williams)		1:07
33.	"Trophy Presentation" (Gregson-Williams and Howe)		1:34
Total length:			60:57
