= Schvendes =

Australian musical group

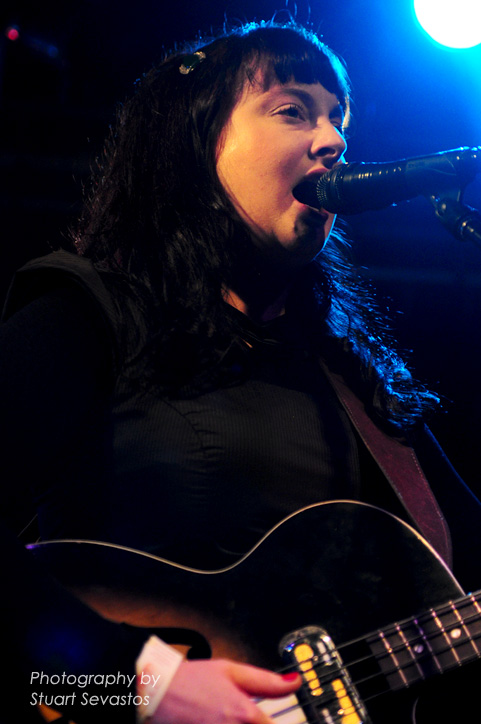

Background information
- Origin: Perth, Western Australia
- Genres: Rock
- Years active: 2002–present
- Labels: Good Cop Bad Cop; Inertia; Reverberation
- Members: Rachael Dease; Tristen Parr; Greg Hosking; Tara John; Ant Gray
- Website: schvendes.com

Schvendes is a band of brothers and sisters from Perth, Western Australia. They write stories about murder, mayhem, love and loss upon a background of gentle Rhodes piano, pounding drums, screaming guitar, soaring cello and vocals, which have been described as both sweet and terrifying. With an emphasis on lyrics depicting small disasters and celebration of everyday existence, their music is a blend of country, dirty blues and rock. Their influences include Nick Cave and the Bad Seeds, Dirty Three, PJ Harvey, Ennio Morricone, Tom Waits and Nina Simone.

== History ==
Schvendes were originally known as The Schvendes Ensemble, a gothy musical wing of the 2002 Artrage Festival, where they performed under the auspices of performance art within art festivals. In this mode they recorded their first release, the hand-packaged live album, The Scoundrel is Made an Outcast, which was released in October 2002. Over the next couple of years the group morphed into a more conventional music group playing at various popular Perth venues.

In March 2005 the group released their debut EP, Turn Out Your Lights, produced by Ben Franz (The Waifs), which was released nationally in December 2005 on Reverberation. This was followed by the release of the single, "Small Mercies, Sweet Graves" in December and a second EP, Twice the Man in March 2006; which was also produced by Franz.

In 2008 the band signed with local independent label, Good Cop Bad Cop and released their debut album, Sweet Talk Your Enemies, on 28 June 2008, distributed nationally through Inertia.

=== Tours ===
In the last year, the band played some seventy shows including the Perth International Arts Festival and WAMi shows as well as a number of national supports for artists such The Kill Devil Hills, Dirty Three, Augie March, Art of Fighting, the Drones, Ed Kuepper, Tim Rogers and Tex Perkins, The Go Betweens, Kim Salmon, Decoder Ring, Tucker B's, 67 Special, Youth Group, The Devoted Few, Holly Throsby and New Buffalo.

In 2007 the band played at the Perth leg of the Big Day Out and in March performed in Toronto at the Canadian Music Week, followed by a number of shows in New York, including a support for Love of Diagrams.

In 2008 the band toured nationally in support of the release of their debut album.

== Members ==
- Rachael Dease – vocals, bass
- Tristen Parr – cello
- Matt Maguire – drums
- Tara John – rhodes piano
- Ant Gray – guitar

== Discography ==
=== Studio albums ===
Title	Details
Sweet Talk Your Enemies	Released: 2008; Label: Good Cop Bad Cop (GCBC003); Format: CD, digital download

=== Live albums ===
Title	Details
The Scoundrel Is Made an Outcast	Released: 2002; Label: Bloodstar (BS27); Format: CD

=== Extended plays ===
Title	Details
Turn Out Your Lights	Released: 2005; Label: Schvendes (SCH001); Format: CD
Twice The Man	Released: 2006; Label: Schvendes (SCH002); Format: CD
Small Mercies, Sweet Graves	Released: 2007; Label: Schvendes (SCH002); Format: CD

== Awards and nominations ==
=== WAM Song of the Year ===
The WAM Song of the Year was formed by the Western Australian Rock Music Industry Association Inc. (WARMIA) in 1985, with its main aim to develop and run annual awards recognising achievements within the music industry in Western Australia.

Year	Nominee / work	Award	Result (wins only)
2007	"Bring Out Your Dead"	Mixed Bag Song of the Year	Won
2010	"Lay the Noose"	Pop Song of the Year	Won

=== West Australian Music Industry Awards ===
The West Australian Music Industry Awards (WAMIs) are annual awards presented to the local contemporary music industry, put on annually by the Western Australian Music Industry Association Inc (WAM).

Year	Nominee / work	Award	Result (wins only)
2006	"Turn out your Lights"	Most Popular Single/EP	Won
2006	Schvendes	Most Promising New Act	Won
2006	Tristen Parr (Schvendes)	Best Instrumentalist	Won
2007	Tristen Parr (Schvendes)	Best Instrumentalist	Won
2008	Ant Gray (Schvendes)	Best Guitarist	Won
2008	Tristen Parr (Schvendes)	Best Instrumentalist	Won
