= Grok Magazine =

Student magazine in Western Australia

- Type: Student newspaper
- Format: Magazine
- Publisher: Curtin Student Guild
- Language: English
- Headquarters: Australia

Grok Magazine is an Australian free student magazine. The magazine is written and produced by Curtin University students and published by the Curtin Student Guild. The magazine was started in about 1970 and named after a word indicating deep understanding that was introduced in Robert Heinlein's novel Stranger in a Strange Land. In 2009, five issues were published, and approximately 10,000 copies distributed per issue. These are distributed on the Curtin Bentley campus in Western Australia, as well as to many street location across the Perth metro area.

In terms of content, Grok publishes a wide variety of articles that includes interviews with international and local Western Australian bands, reviews and focus on arts events and Perth theatre, music and movie reviews and features focussed on an issue relevant to the theme of each issue. (Themes in 2007 included "Rant", "Retro", "Tabloid" and "Noise".) The first 20 pages of Grok are dedicated to the Curtin Student Guild's coverage of university events.

Grok has a strong tradition of student journalism stemming from Curtin University's journalism school, where lecturers urge students to build their portfolios by becoming regular contributors to the magazine. Previous editors of Grok include Australian Broadcasting Corporation Melbourne journalist Adam Connors, Condé Nast Publications Milan reporter Stephanie Epiro, documentary and music video producer Diana Ward, Simon Collins, music editor for The West Australian newspaper and Matthew Giles and Katie Lenanton, who now oversee the Love Is My Velocity record label and organise independent music events in the Perth metropolitan area. The 2007 editor, Melissa Davey, went on to work for the Media, Entertainment and Arts Alliance and International Federation of Journalists in Sydney. The 1973 editor Kim Dovey later became Professor of Architecture and Urban Design at the University of Melbourne and an occasional ABC broadcaster.
