= Pierre Simard =

Canadian professor of social sciences

Pierre Simard (born 1954, Québec) is a Canadian professor of social sciences who applies economic theory to political science.

== Career ==
Born in Québec, Simard received a bachelor's degree in economics (1978), a master's degree in policy analysis (1980) and a Ph.D in political science (1985), from the Université Laval.

Simard has been a professor at the École nationale d’administration publique (ENAP) since 1984. He started as a Research Professor at the Centre d'études politiques et administratives du Québec (CEPAQ). In 1989, Simard became a regular Professor at the ENAP. He specializes in policy analysis and evaluation of public programs. He has also been a consultant for public and private agencies.

== Ideas ==
Simard defends a liberal vision of the role of the State. He is a defender of individual liberties, free market and reducing the size of the State. Simard is a specialist of Public Choice: a discipline that applies economic theory to political science. He strongly criticizes public inefficiency through the major Quebec newspapers.

== Publications ==
- BEAUDOIN André, Pierre SIMARD, Daniel TURCOTTE (dir.) (2002) Évaluation des centres de ressources périnatales, Québec, Centre de recherche sur les services communautaires de l'Université Laval.
- BEAUDOIN André, Pierre SIMARD, Daniel TURCOTTE et Jean TURGEON (dir.) (2000). L’éducation familiale en milieu défavorisé : portrait québécois du Programme d'action communautaire pour les enfants, Québec, Éditions Sylvain Harvey, 199 p. (LC37E24.2000)
- COMEAU Yvan, Daniel TURCOTTE, André BEAUDOIN, Pierre SIMARD, Julie CHARTRAND-BEAUREGARD, Marie-Êve HARVEY, Daniel MALTAIS, Claudie SAINT-HILAIRE,. L'économie sociale et le Plan d'action du Sommet sur l'économie et l'emploi, Québec, ENAP et Centre de recherche sur les services communautaires de l'Université Laval, novembre 2000, 337p.
- MARCEAU Richard, Pierre SIMARD (1986). Des élus et des milliards : l'assainissement des eaux usées domestiques au Québec, Québec, CEPAQ, ENAP, 196 p. (JF 1338.B595 8)
