= Michael de Grussa =

Australian singer-songwriter (born 1982)

- Born: Michael Peter de Grussa; 27 May 1982 (age 44)
- Origin: Adelaide, Australia
- Genres: rock, soundtrack
- Occupations: singer, songwriter
- Instruments: vocals, piano, guitar, bass, drums, keyboard, bagpipes, banjo
- Years active: 1999–present
- Website: Teaboy Productions

Michael de Grussa (born 27 May 1982, in Adelaide, South Australia) is an Australian singer-songwriter.

== Career ==
In 2003 joined the original line up of Perth Band The Kill Devil Hills and release the album Heathen Songs later that year, In 2005 he became the session piano player for Australian rock group Eskimo Joe and played with them for the 'Black Fingernails, Red Wine' tour. in 2006 he continued to play piano for Perth band Blanche DuBois.

== Discography ==
- The Man (and his evil icecream plan) (2005)
1. "The Man (version 2.2)"
2. "F**k (i love dancing)"
3. "Truckin' Fever"
4. "Hey, Mr. Mackintosh"
5. "Le Zoom Zoom"
6. "Bum Babies"
7. "Sarah"
8. "Followed by a Polar Bear"
9. "Time Is Our Forever"
10. "Trans Am"
- The de Grussa Band (2006)
1. "A Shock"
2. "Hey, Mr. Mackintosh"
3. "My Robot Girl"
4. "The Girl Next Door"
5. "Come and get your Stuff Steff"
6. "Super Mega Best Shoes"
7. "Muchos Nachos Buenos"
8. "Too Sad To Rock"
9. "The Man (version 3.1)"
10. "Man on a Mission"
11. "The Same"
12. "I Dreamed I Cut My Hair"
13. "[bonus track] Tina Turner"
