= Institut Polaire =

Australian musical group

- Origin: Perth, Western Australia, Australia
- Genres: Indie
- Years active: 2004–2011
- Labels: Love Is My Velocity; Popfrenzy
- Past members: Ash Blakeney; Elliott Brannen; Catherine Colvin; Erik Hecht; Toby Lang; Rebecca May; David Thirkettle-Watts; Samantha Wass; Russell Loasby; Alex Arpino; Monique Archer; Chris Havercroft; Ben Blakeney

Institut Polaire was an indie band that originated in Perth, Western Australia.

== History ==
Institut Polaire formed as a three piece in 2004 by an American ex-pat (Erik Hecht), an English born scientist (David Thirkettle-Watts) and a country boy moved to the big city (Ash Blakeney; who left the band in 2005, handing over his role to cousin Ben). Institut Polaire has grown from three piece roots into a full-blown collective who currently number between seven and nine members toting everything from vintage Wurlitzer pianos to violins, banjos, trumpets, MacBooks, and glockenspiels.

In recent times, the collective have shared the stage with acclaimed artists and bands including Camera Obscura, The Clientele, Architecture in Helsinki, Jens Lekman, Lou Barlow, Gerling, New Buffalo, Starky, The Panics, and The Lucksmiths.

Institut Polaire's debut 7-inch single "City Walls and Empires" (released through Love Is My Velocity Records) won them the Western Australian Music Industry's 'Song of the Year' Award for 2006 and has since received national airplay.

"It was a fantastic confidence boost," Hecht said about the band's win in X-Press Magazine, "To see how much things have evolved in the band dynamic, instrumentation and songwriting since recording the debut single is exciting. I think most of us would agree that we are far more proud of the music we've been writing since. And I really suspect we may take some people by surprise with the records we put out this year."

In 2007, Institut Polaire performed at the Perth leg of the Big Day Out having won Triple J's Unearthed competition for Western Australia. They also performed with Bob Evans and Bobby Blackbird & The Bluejays at the WAMi-styled Triple J Live at the Wireless gig at the Rosemount Hotel.

The band were nominated for 'Best Indie Pop Act', at the 2007 WAMi Awards and also undertook their first national tour supporting Camera Obscura.

In February 2007, Institut Polaire announced that they have been signed as the first Australian artist on Popfrenzy Records.

"I think the main goal for 2007 is to continue to evolve and make some great records,"

Their first release was an EP called The Fauna and the Flora which was released on 1 October 2007. The EP was Drum Media's 'single of the week'. Institut Polaire have also been named as one of Triple J's Next Crop featured artists for Aus Music Month (November 2007) and have been nominated as for a 2007 J Award (Unearthed new artist category). The EP also debuted at No. 19 on the AIR (Association of Independent Record Labels) singles chart. "City Walls and Empires" entered the Australian Top 40 Countdown chart at No. 40 in May 2008.

In early 2008, the band relocated to Melbourne for the foreseeable future and quickly undertook a national tour with Sydney's Cuthbert & The Night Walkers (presented by Triple J's 'Home and Hosed') in May. Directed by Beatrice Pegard and produced by Diana Ward, the video for "City Walls and Empires" won Most Popular Music Video at the 2008 WAMi Awards.

In early December, it was announced that long-time member Ben Blakeney had left the band on completely amicable terms to concentrate on his own projects. Original guitarist Ash Blakeney rejoined the band as lead guitarist.

Amidst this lineup switch, the band also recruited Toby Lang (ex-Veruca Salt and dual-ARIA award winners The Audreys) as their new drummer.

The band recorded their debut album with Craig Pilkington at Melbourne's Audrey Studios. Craig's previous resume included several releases for The Lucksmiths, a co-producing credit on The Blackeyed Susans ARIA-nominated 'Shangri-La' and engineering 2008's ARIA-winning 'Gurrumul' by Geoffrey Gurrumul Yunupingu.

The LP, titled 'Make Your Own Mayflower', was released in 2010.

The band announced its separation in January 2011.

Samantha Wass and David Thirkettle-Watts currently play in the band Jack on Fire, Ash Blakeney and Toby Lang toured Australia and South America with Kate Nash and Elliott Brannen returned to Perth and plays with 6s & 7s and The Autumn Isles.

Erik Hecht co-wrote and sang on the track with Dirty South and Those Usual Suspects called 'Walking Alone', which went on to worldwide headline DJ support by the likes of Tiesto and Axwell, featured in the 20th Century Fox movie 'Chronicle' (2012), and appeared on the deluxe edition of the final Swedish House Mafia album 'Until Now' (2012). Swedish House Mafia also named it as their Essential New Track during their guest takeover of Pete Tong's show on BBC Radio 1.

== Band members ==
- Ash Blakeney – guitar, vocals
- Elliott Brannen – trumpet, flugelhorn, vocals, keys
- Catherine Colvin – violin, vocals
- Erik Hecht – vocals, guitar, banjo, keys
- Toby Lang – drums, percussion
- Rebecca May – keys, flute, vocals
- David Thirkettle – Watts - bass
- Samantha Wass – acoustic guitar, vocals, keys, piano accordion

== Discography ==
=== Albums ===
Title	Details
Make Your Own Mayflower	Released: 2010; Label: Popfrenzy Records (PF111); Format: CD, digital download

=== Extended plays ===
Title	Details
The Fauna & The Flora	Released: October 2007; Label: Popfrenzy Records (PF063); Format: CD, digital download

== Awards and nominations ==
=== J Award ===
The J Awards are an annual series of Australian music awards that were established by the Australian Broadcasting Corporation's youth-focused radio station Triple J. They commenced in 2005.

Year	Nominee / work	Award	Result
J Awards of 2007	themselves	Unearthed Artist of the Year	Nominated

=== WAM Song of the Year ===
The WAM Song of the Year was formed by the Western Australian Rock Music Industry Association Inc. (WARMIA) in 1985, with its main aim to develop and run annual awards recognising achievements within the music industry in Western Australia.

Year	Nominee / work	Award	Result (wins only)
2006	"City Walls and Empires"	Pop Song of the Year	Won
2006	"City Walls and Empires"	Song of the Year	Won

=== West Australian Music Industry Awards ===
The West Australian Music Industry Awards (WAMIs) are annual awards presented to the local contemporary music industry, put on annually by the Western Australian Music Industry Association Inc (WAM). Institut Polaire won one awards.

Year	Nominee / work	Award	Result (wins only)
2008	Institut Polaire	Best Indie Pop Act	Won
