= Man, You Should Explode =

Studio album by The Kill Devil Hills
- Released: September 2009
- Recorded: January 2009
- Genre: Blues rock; country; folk
- Length: 45:14
- Label: Torn and Frayed; Shock Records; Bang! Records (Spain)
- Producer: Burke Reid

The Kill Devil Hills chronology
The Drought (2006)	Man, You Should Explode (2009)	Past and Future Ghosts (2013)

Man, You Should Explode is the third album from The Kill Devil Hills, released on 25 September 2009.

The album was recorded in January 2009 at Poons Head Studio, Fremantle, with producer Burke Reid.

== Track listing ==
1. "It's Easy When You Don't Know How" – 3:05
2. "Cockfighter";– 3:54
3. "I Don't Think This Shit Can Last Much Longer" – 4:10
4. "Rosalie" – 3:29
5. "The White Lady" – 4:05
6. "Words From Robin To Batman" – 5:26
7. "When The Wolf Come" – 6:15
8. "Siam" – 4:15
9. "Cool My Desire" – 5:36
10. "Lucy-On-All-Fours" – 5:03
