= Pitcho Womba Konga =

Congolese-Belgian actor (born 1975)

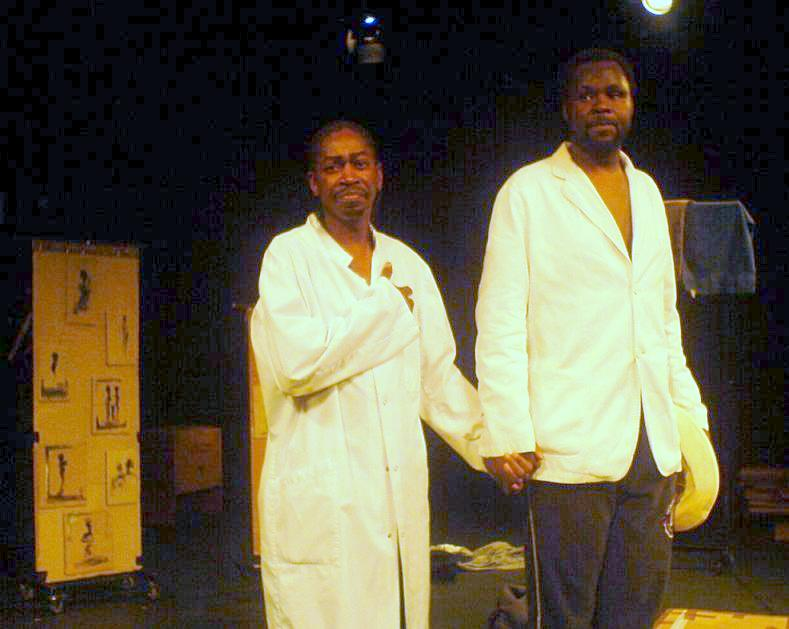
- Pitcho Womba Konga (right) and Habib Dembélé in Sizwe Banzi is Dead, Barbican Centre, London, May 2007
- Born: 11 December 1975 (age 50); Léopoldville, Zaire
- Occupation: actor

Pitcho Womba Konga (born 11 December 1975) is a Congolese-Belgian actor. He was born in Kinshasa, Zaire (now the Democratic Republic of Congo) and emigrated to Belgium when he was seven years old. He formed the hip hop group Onde de Choc in 1994 and went on to create Funkdamtion, an artistic joint work to promote hip hop culture in Belgium. Pitcho's first album Regarde Comment was released in 2003 to critical acclaim.

His first theatre credit was in 2003 in Bintou of the Ivory by Koffie Kwahule, directed by Rosa Gasquet. He also performed in Peter Brook's Tierno Bokar (2004) and Sizwe Banzi is Dead (2007). Womba Konga released his EP Faut pas confondre in 2005 and has also created his own production company, Skinfama.
