= The Drought (The Kill Devil Hills album) =

Studio album by The Kill Devil Hills
- Released: October 2006
- Recorded: November 2005 & February - June 2006
- Genre: Blues-rock; Country; Folk
- Length: 50:36
- Label: Torn and Frayed/Shock Records
- Producer: Ben Franz

The Kill Devil Hills chronology
Heathen Songs (2004)	The Drought (2006)	Man, You Should Explode (2008)

The Drought is the second album from The Kill Devil Hills, released in October 2006.

The album was recorded in late November 2005 at the Donnelly River Mill Worker's Club and then between February and June 2006 at Studio Couch, North Fremantle, with producer Ben Franz (The Waifs).

== Track listing ==
1. "Did I Damage You?" – 3:10
2. "Dogs O' War" – 2:32
3. "Nasty Business" – 5:18
4. "Boneyard Rider" – 4:39
5. "The Drought" – 5:44
6. "Drugs, Spices & Silk" – 6:03
7. "New Country" – 3:13
8. "This Old Town" – 6:38
9. "The Forsaken Few" – 4:32
10. "I Wonder If She's Thinking Of Me Now" – 5:33
11. "Jesus Train" – 3:14

== Reviews ==
- Australian Music Online Review
- Web Wombat Review
