= The Equalizer (soundtrack) =

The Equalizer (Original Motion Picture Soundtrack)

Film score by Harry Gregson-Williams
- Released: September 23, 2014
- Recorded: 2014
- Genre: Film score
- Length: 51:26
- Label: Varèse Sarabande

Harry Gregson-Williams chronology
Hate from a Distance (2013)	The Equalizer (2014)	Blackhat (2015)

The Equalizer (Original Motion Picture Soundtrack) is the soundtrack to the 2014 film The Equalizer starring Denzel Washington and directed by Antoine Fuqua. Featuring musical score composed by Harry Gregson-Williams and performed by the Hollywood Studio Symphony, the soundtrack was released through Varèse Sarabande on September 23, 2014.

== Background ==
On June 21, 2013, it was announced that Harry Gregson-Williams would score music for The Equalizer; this eventually marked Gregson-Williams and Fuqua's second collaboration and first since 16 years, after the release of The Replacement Killers (1998), which was also Fuqua's debut. Having watched the original 1985 television series, Harry found that Robert McCall's character had a "smooth, cool personality" because of his English accent; however, Washington's portrayal had changed the essence of the character making it more believable and was also too similar to his role in Man on Fire (2004), which Gregson-Williams also composed for. Due to the grounded and realistic nature of the film's action, Fuqua insisted Harry to "have the score steeped in realism" and refrain from utilizing superficial, supernatural kind of music and instead lean on showcasing the character's emotions.

To achieve the character's emotional side, Gregson-Williams wrote a sole piano theme accompanies by strings and guitars, which tonally shifts to drums and electric guitars. Throughout the film's score, Gregson-Williams sampled percussion and electronic instruments with the orchestra (as with most of his action films) so that he could provide a hybrid mixture of electronic and acoustic instrumentation. He did not use woodwinds in the score, as it felt unnecessary. The first scene he scored for was when McCall tracks down the mobsters who harassed Teri (Chloë Grace Moretz). It was a tense music that begins in a gentle manner owing to his approach; he eventually played that theme to Fuqua which liked it but suggested that he wanted it to be even more extreme. Gregson-Williams recalled that "To have the gentle moments even more gentle so when the aggressive moments came they were more of a surprise and more contrasting."

Varèse Sarabande distributed the soundtrack album featuring Gregson-Williams score on September 23, 2014. Though not featured in the soundtrack, the song "Guts Over Fear" performed by Eminem featuring Sia and produced by Emile Haynie featured in the film's trailers and eventually played in the film's closing credits.

== Critical reception ==
Filmtracks.com wrote "Gregson-Williams' score only offers the absolute most basic accompaniment necessary to enhance the suspense of the environment and story." James Southall of Movie Wave criticised it as a "bog-standard, resolutely bland modern action/thriller music". Pete Simons of Synchrotones wrote "it does come with the caveat that it's merely more of the same". Ross Boyask of Blueprint wrote "what makes both the film, and the soundtrack itself, so damn good, is that they do everything they are supposed to do, and they do it very well indeed."

== Track listing ==
The Equalizer (Original Motion Picture Soundtrack) track listing
No.	Title	Length
1.	"Alone"	4:08
2.	"Change Your World"	4:07
3.	"McCall's Decision"	4:08
4.	"On a Mission"	3:51
5.	"Corrupt Cops"	2:47
6.	"A Quiet Voice"	3:37
7.	"It's All a Lie"	10:35
8.	"Concerned Citizen"	2:43
9.	"Make an Exception"	5:08
10.	"Torturing Frank"	3:43
11.	"The Equalizer"	6:39
Total length:		51:26

== Personnel ==
Credits adapted from liner notes.

- Music composer and producer – Harry Gregson-Williams
- Engineer – Jamie Luker
- Programming – Hybrid, Justin Burnett, Phil Klein
- Recording – Brad Haehnel, Paul Thomason
- Mixing – Mal Luker
- Mastering – Pat Sullivan
- Music editor – Richard Whitfield
- Pro-tools operator – Abhay Manusare, Paul Thomason
- Music co-ordinator – Monica Zeirhut
- Executive producer – Robert Townson
- Orchestra contractor – Peter Rotter
- Orchestration – Ladd McIntosh
- Concertmaster – Endre Granat

Instruments

- Bass – Christian Kollgaard, David Parmeter, Drew Dembowski, Edward Meares, Michael Valerio, Nico Abondolo
- Cello – Andrew Shulman, Armen Ksajikian, Cecilia Tsan, Christina Soule, Dane Little, Dennis Karmazyn, Eric Byers, Erika Duke-Kirkpatrick, George Kim Scholes, Jacob Braun, John Walz, Paula Hochhalter, Timothy Landauer, Timothy Loo, Vanessa Freebairn-Smith, Xiaodan Zheng, Steve Erdody
- Electric cello – Martin Tillman
- Electric guitar – George Doering, Peter DiStefano
- Electric violin – Hugh Marsh
- Piano – Harry Gregson-Williams
- Strings – The Hollywood Studio Symphony
- Viola – Alma Fernandez, Andrew Duckles, Darrin McCann, David Walther, Jennie Hansen, John Zach Dellinger, Jonathan Moerschel, Keith Greene, Lauren Chipman, Luke Maurer, Matthew Funes, Meredith Crawford, Pamela Jacobson, Roland Kato, Thomas Diener, Victoria Miskolczy, Victor De Almeida, Shawn Mann
- Violin – Alyssa Park, Bruce Dukov, Charlie Bisharat, Eun-Mee Ahn, Helen Nightengale, Irina Voloshina, Jacqueline Brand, Jessica Guideri, Josefina Vergara, Julie Gigante, Katia Popov, Kevin Connolly, Lisa Sutton, Lorenz Gamma, Natalie Leggett, Neil Samples, Phillip Levy, Roberto Cani, Roger Wilkie, Serena McKinney, Shalini Vijayan, Songa Lee, Tamara Hatwan
