= Tucker B's =

Australian band

- Origin: Perth, Western Australia, Australia
- Genres: Rock
- Years active: 1994–present
- Labels: pendulum 12; Aquamudvuv; Quietly Suburban; Grimsey Records; Pompous/Inertia/Remote Control; Low Transit Industries
- Members: Matt Rudas; Andrew Houston; Darren Nuttall; Matt Blackman
- Past members: see Members list below
- Website: tuckerbs.com

Tucker B's are an Australian rock band, originally from Perth, but based in Sydney since 2005.

== History ==
The Tucker B's were formed at the end of 1994 by Matt Rudas and Andrew Houston, performing their first gig together at the Harbourside in Fremantle. In 1995, with the addition of Sean Pezzali, they released a tape called Pipo Karna Eh. Arm A Drunk was released in 1997; shortly afterwards, drummer Sean Pezzali left to work in Australia's north.

In 2003, with the addition of Darren Nuttall and Tim Day, the Tucker B's released Bish Bosh II: The Bosh Bosh through Quietly Suburban Records. The band toured the album extensively throughout Australia. This schedule took its toll, with Tim Day leaving the band, to be replaced by Matthew Maguire from Adam Said Galore.

In 2005 the band moved to Sydney and released their fourth studio album, Chubby, which spawned a hit single with "The Turning" on high rotation on Triple J and "Bullets" not far behind. In 2007, Matt Blackman (Purplene, Charge Group, Palace of Fire) took up the role of drummer for the band (the eighth drummer the band has had).

In 2009 they released their latest album, Nightmares in the Key of (((((Wow))))), which was produced by Burke Reid (The Mess Hall, The Drones) and features contributions from Chris Ross (Wolfmother, Palace of Fire).

== Touring ==
The Tucker B's have played many shows in Perth supporting artists including Bluetile Lounge, Molasses, O!, Squadcar 9x, Adam Said Galore, Jon Spencer and his Blues Explosion, Trans Am, and in the Eastern States supporting Peabody, Art of Fighting, Dappled Cities Fly, and the Mountain Goats and Wolfmother among others.

The Tucker B's have also played at the South By Southwest Festival in Austin, Texas, complete with an extensive tour of the United States. This was followed in 2006 by a national tour supporting Wolfmother.

In 2007 The Tucker B's performed at the Sydney leg of the Big Day Out and at Homebake.

== Members ==
=== Current ===
- Andrew Houston — bass, vocals (1994–present)
- Matt Rudas — guitar, vocals (1994–present)
- Darren Nuttall — guitar, vocals (2000–present)
- Matt Blackman — drums (2006–present)
- Brent Griffin (Spod); keyboards (live 2009–present)

=== Former ===
- Rick Bryant — guitar
- Reid Butler — drums (2005–06)
- Nikolai Danko — drums (2006)
- Tim Day — drums (2003)
- Horrie Gauze — drums
- Damien Gill — saxophone
- Michael Lake — guitar
- Matt Maguire — drums (2003–05)
- Sean Pezzali — drums (1994–1997)
- Daniel Spittles — drums

== Discography ==
=== Chubby — Pompous/Inertia/Remote Control (2005) ===
- The Turning
- Oh Problem
- Yes No Authority
- Forget all these F**kss
- The Legs
- Nothing Can Touch Me Now You
- Bish Bosh II: The Bosh Bosh
- Undisciplined
- Bullets
- Suss Services
- Lord We Are Your Playlord
