= The Kill Devil Hills =

Australian rock band

- Origin: Fremantle, Western Australia, Australia
- Genres: Blues rock, country, folk
- Years active: 2003–present
- Members: Brendon Humphries; Alex Archer; Ryan Dux; Todd Pickett; Luke Dux
- Past members: Steve Joines; Steve Gibson; Michael de Grussa; Lachlan Gurr; Justin Castley; Timothy Nelson
- Website: thekilldevilhills.com.au

The Kill Devil Hills are an Australian acoustic, country-tinged rock band formed in 2003 in Fremantle by founding mainstays Brendon Humphries and Steve Joines. They have released six studio albums, Heathen Songs (2004), The Drought (2006), Man, You Should Explode (2009), In on Under near Water (2016), Pink Fit (2018) and Matango! (2024).

== History ==
The Kill Devil Hills were formed in Fremantle in early 2003 by Brendon Humphries on lead vocals, and Steve Joines on vocals and guitar and Steve Gibson on drums and vocals . Initially the trio played "bushranger rock" and "cowpunk". The name of the band is derived from the title of a chapter, written by Harry Smith in a book, Invisible Republic: Bob Dylan's Basement Tapes by US music critic Greil Marcus, about Bob Dylan and The Band. In the late 1990s Humphries had been a member of Gutterville Splendour Six, alongside Gareth Liddiard and Rui Pereira of the Drones, which issued a self-titled extended play in 1998. The Kill Devil Hills were soon joined by Michael de Grussa on Double Bass and Piano with the later addition of Alex Archer on violin and Justin Castley on bass.

The Kill Devil Hills released their debut album, Heathen Songs, in August 2004 and nationally in February 2005 on the Reverberation label. Michael Inglis of FasterLouder felt that "While the album has its dull moments, the Kill Devil Hills have come up with a coherant [sic] debut album that asserts the band's identity. At the same time, there are enough standout tracks to make this disc worth your hard-earned dollars." In the same month they were nominated for six WAMi Awards, taking home "Best Blues/Roots Act" and "Best Country Music Act".

National youth radio station, Triple J, picked up the album, with Heathen Songs receiving a lot of airplay on a variety of shows. They were chosen as one of their 'fresh Crop' Artists of 2005. The group featured on Triple J's "Like a Version" segment and its JTV. They appeared on the Lonely Planet documentary series, "Six Degrees", broadcast on SBS. The band performed at The West Coast Blues & Roots Festival 2005. Also that year they appeared at Bridgetown Blues Festival, where they played on stages supporting The Black Keys, The Mountain Goats, The Living End, Dallas Crane, The Mess Hall, Kim Salmon, Jebediah, The Panics and The Drones. The band undertook a short tour of the east coast in May and were invited back to Sydney for shows in November the same year.

2006 saw the band taking time to record a new album, spending most of this year in the studio, with plans to release the new record in October. They were also nominated for another 4 WAMi Awards (winning for the second year in a row – "Best Blues/Roots Act" and "Best Country Music Act"), they performed on the local stage at The Big Day Out, were asked to record a live set for Triple J's 'Home and Hosed', and were invited back to The Bridgetown Blues Festival , where they played with The Beasts of Bourbon and Dirty Three.

The band's second album, The Drought was released 7 October 2006 and was followed by a national tour. The Kill Devil Hills also released a limited edition vinyl import version of Heathen Songs through Spanish record label Bang! Records (a Spanish label which has many other underground Australian bands on its roster).

The Kill Devil Hills returned to the studio in early 2009 to record their third studio album, Man, You Should Explode, produced by Burke Reid. It was released nationally on 5 September 2009 on Torn and Frayed (distributed by Shock). The album was given a four-star review in Rolling Stone magazine, where it was described as "a new flawless record" and "one of the best of 2010". The band also embarked on a two-month European tour in late 2010 with the European release of Man, You Should Explode on vinyl through the Spanish label, Bang! Records.

In October 2013 the band released its first live album, Past and Future Ghosts, which was recorded in March that year at the Fremantle Arts Centre. The album contained songs from their first three albums, together with two previously unreleased songs.

In March 2016, they issued their fourth studio album, In on Under near Water, which Kate Hennessy of The Guardian listed as one of ten "essential releases from the Australian underground". She described it as "a brilliant showcase of what the Devils do best... No one wrings a ballad dry quite like Humphries, and his lyrics, always good, have slimmed into sleek, allusive poetry."

== Members ==
Current members

- Brendon Humphries (vocals, steel/acoustic guitar, electric guitar banjo, piano)
- Luke Dux (acoustic/electric guitar, slide guitar)
- Todd Pickett (vocals, drums, percussion)
- Alex Archer (violin, piano, electric guitar, clarinet, slide guitar, organ)
- Ryan Dux (vocals, bass)

Ex-members

- Steve Joines (acoustic/electric guitar, vocals) Guitar Maestro and founding member
- Justin Castley (electric bass, double bass, tin whistle)
- Lachlan Gurr (vocals, mandolin, banjo)
- Michael de Grussa (piano, double bass, banjo, vocals)
- Steve Gibson (vocals, drums, percussion, xylophone)
- Timothy Nelson (keyboards, vocals)

== Discography ==
=== Albums ===
| Title | Details |
|---|---|
| Heathen Songs | Released: August 2004; Label: The Kill Devil Hills (KDH001) |
| The Drought | Released: 7 October 2006; Label: Torn & Frayed (TORNCD16) |
| Man, You Should Explode | Released: 25 September 2009; Label: Torn & Frayed (TORNCD24) |
| In On Under Near Water | Released: 18 March 2016; Label: The Kill Devil Hills (KDH002) |
| Pink Fit | Released: 2018; Label: BANG! Records (BANG!-LP124) |
| Matango! | Released March 2024); Label: BANG! Records (BANG!-LP170) |

=== live albums ===
| Title | Details |
|---|---|
| Past and Future Ghosts | Released: 16 October 2013; Label: The Kill Devil Hills |

== Awards ==
=== National Live Music Awards ===
The National Live Music Awards (NLMAs) commenced in 2016 to recognise contributions to the live music industry in Australia.

| Year | Nominee / work | Award | Result | Ref. |
|---|---|---|---|---|
| 2023 | The Kill Devil Hills | Best Live Act in Western Australia | Nominated | |
| 2023 | Brendon Humphries (The Kill Devil Hills) | Best Live Voice in Western Australia | Nominated | |

=== West Australian Music Industry Awards ===
The West Australian Music Industry Awards (WAMIs) are annual awards presented to the local contemporary music industry, put on annually by the Western Australian Music Industry Association Inc (WAM).

| Year | Nominee / work | Award | Result (wins only) |
|---|---|---|---|
| 2005 | The Kill Devil Hills | Best Blues/Roots Act | Won |
| 2005 | The Kill Devil Hills | Best Country Music Act | Won |
| 2006 | The Kill Devil Hills | Best Blues/Roots Act | Won |
| 2006 | The Kill Devil Hills | Best Country Music Act | Won |
| 2007 | The Kill Devil Hills | Best Blues/Roots Act | Won |
| 2008 | The Kill Devil Hills | Best Blues/Roots Act | Won |
| 2008 | The Kill Devil Hills | Best Country Music Act | Won |
| 2008 | Brendon Humphries | Best Male Vocalist (The Kill Devil Hills) | Won |
| 2009 | The Kill Devil Hills | Best Country Act | Won |
| 2010 | The Kill Devil Hills | Best Rock Act | Won |
