= Jebediah discography =

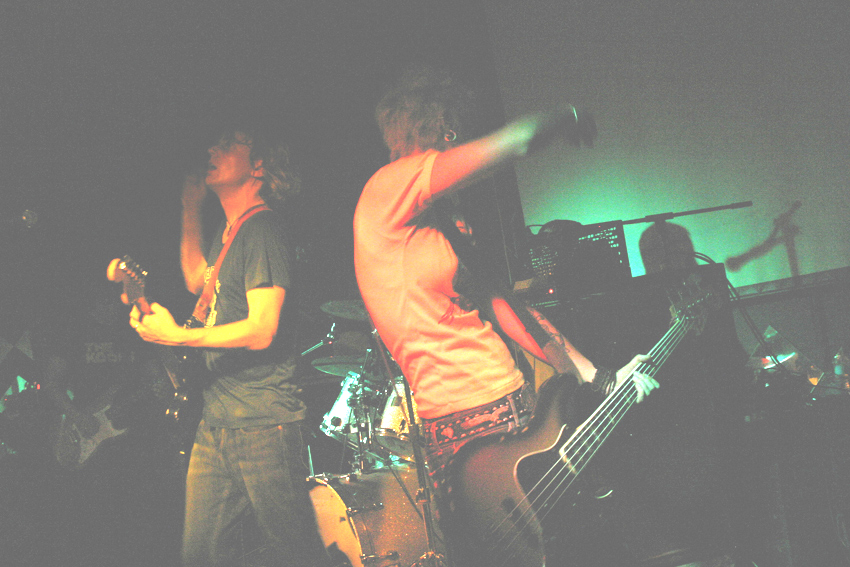
- Jebediah, performing in November 2007
- Studio albums: 6
- EPs: 2
- Compilation albums: 2
- Singles: 17
- Video albums: 1

The discography of Jebediah, an Australian alternative rock band, consists of six studio albums, two compilation albums, one video album, two extended plays and seventeen singles.

In November 2023, the band were inducted into the West Australian Music Industry Hall of Fame.

== Albums ==
=== Studio albums ===
List of albums, with selected chart positions
Title	Album details	Peak chart positions	Certifications (sales thresholds)
Title	Album details	AUS	Certifications (sales thresholds)
Slightly Odway	Released: 8 September 1997; Label: Murmur (MATTCD056); Format: CD, 2×LP	7	ARIA: 2× Platinum
Of Someday Shambles	Released: 1 November 1999; Label: Murmur (MATTCD092); Format: CD, 2×LP	2	ARIA: Platinum
Jebediah	Released: 3 March 2002; Label: Murmur (MATTCD118); Format: CD, LP	8	
Braxton Hicks	Released: 12 July 2004; Label: Redline (RED025); Format: CD	26	
Kosciuszko	Released: 15 April 2011; Label: Dew Process (DEW9000298); Format: CD, LP	6	
Oiks	Released: 12 April 2024; Label: Cooking Vinyl (CVLP114); Format: CD, LP, digital	38	

=== Compilation albums ===
List of compilation albums, with selected chart positions
Title	Album details	Peak chart positions
Title	Album details	AUS
Glee Sides and Sparities	Released: January 2003; Label: Murmur (MATTCD127); Format: CD	—
Twenty	Released: 29 May 2015; Label: Sony Music Australia (88875084682); Format: 2×CD, 2×LP	32
"—" denotes releases that did not chart.

=== Video albums ===
List of video albums
Title	Album details
Jebediaries (Note: Jebediaries is a collection of the band's music video clips for each of their singles between 1997 and 2000. It also includes handpicked footage chronicling the visual history of the band from a performance of "Tracksuit" at the Murdoch University tavern in July 1995, through to their performance of "In Orbit" on the main stage of the Big Day Out in Sydney in January 2000.)	Released: October 2000; Label: Sony (201259 9); Format: VHS, DVD

== Extended plays ==
List of extended plays
Title	Details	Peak chart positions
Title	Details	AUS
Twitch	Released: 5 August 1996; Label: Murmur (MATTCD035); Format: EP	61
Anniversary E.P.	Released: 20 June 2005; Label: Redline Records (RED026); Format: EP	86

== Singles ==
Year	Title	Peak chart positions	Album
Year	Title	AUS	Album
1997	"Jerks of Attention"	62	Slightly Odway
1997	"Leaving Home"	48	Slightly Odway
1997	"Military Strongmen"	65	Slightly Odway
1998	"Teflon"	41	Slightly Odway
1998	"Harpoon"	46	Slightly Odway
1999	"Animal"	16	Of Someday Shambles
1999	"Feet Touch the Ground"	73	Of Someday Shambles
2000	"Please Leave"	53	Of Someday Shambles
2001	"Fall Down"	24	Jebediah
2002	"Nothing Lasts Forever"	50	Jebediah
2002	"N.D.C."	92	Jebediah
2004	"First Time"	50	Braxton Hicks
2004	"No Sleep"	—	Braxton Hicks
2010	"Lost My Nerve"	—	Kosciuszko
2011	"She's Like a Comet"	47	Kosciuszko
2023	"Gum Up the Bearings"	—	OIKS
2023	"Rubberman"	—	OIKS
2024	"Motivation"	—	OIKS
"—" denotes a recording that did not chart or was not released in that territory.
