= Twenty (Jebediah album) =

Compilation album by Jebediah
- Released: 29 May 2015
- Genre: Alternative rock
- Length: 87:01
- Label: Sony Music Australia

Jebediah chronology
Kosciusko (2011)	Twenty (2015)	Oiks (2024)

Twenty is a compilation album by Australian alternative rock band, Jebediah. To celebrate the band's twentieth anniversary Jebediah undertook a national tour of Australia and released a collection of twenty songs which spans their entire catalogue. The songs were selected by the band, ranging from "Tracksuit" which appeared on the band's first release, Twitch in 1996 through to "She's Like a Comet", from their fifth studio album, Kosciusko.

The album was released on 29 May 2015 by Sony Music Australia, as a digital download, double CD and double vinyl album, and peaked at No. 32 on the ARIA Albums Chart.

== Track listing ==
Twenty track listing CD 1
No.	Title	original album	Length
1.	"Star Machine"	Of Someday Shambles	4:43
2.	"Fall Down"	Jebediah	3:19
3.	"Jerks of Attention" (2015 Remix)	Slightly Odway	4:15
4.	"Animal"	Of Someday Shambles	4:28
5.	"Control"	Kosciuszko	3:27
6.	"Leaving Home"	Slightly Odway	3:01
7.	"First Time"	Braxton Hicks	4:13
8.	"She's Like a Comet"	Kosciuszko	3:43
9.	"Harpoon"	Slightly Odway	4:26
10.	"Please Leave"	Of Someday Shambles	3:34

Twenty track listing CD 2
No.	Title	original album	Length
1.	"Military Strongmen"	Slightly Odway	3:27
2.	"Tracksuit"	Twitch	4:53
3.	"Feet Touch the Ground"	Of Someday Shambles	5:04
4.	"It's Over"	Braxton Hicks	4:19
5.	"Monument"	Glee Sides and Sparities	4:07
6.	"Yesterday When I Was Brave"	Jebediah	6:05
7.	"More Alone"	Braxton Hicks	4:19
8.	"Teflon"	Slightly Odway	3:46
9.	"Lost My Nerve"	Kosciuszko	4:59
10.	"Run of the Company"	Of Someday Shambles	6:57

== Charts ==
Chart performance of Twenty
Chart (2015)	Peak position
Australian Albums (ARIA)	32

== Release history ==
Country	Release date	Format	Label	Catalogue
Australia	29 May 2015	2×CD, 2×LP	Sony Music Australia	88875084682 / 88875085261
