= Indie 2000 =

Australian compilation album series

Indie 2000 was a series of alternative music compilations that enjoyed moderate success in Australia throughout the latter half of the 1990s. There were a total of nine volumes. The title was changed to simply Indie for volumes 8 and 9. The compilations consisted of popular alternative songs, a considerable amount of them being by Australian bands.

== Discography ==
=== Indie 2000 Volume 1 ===
==== Disc 1 ====
1. "Jesus Built My Hotrod (Album Version)" – Ministry
2. "A.D.I.D.A.S." – Korn
3. "Slave" – Silverchair
4. "Mach 5" – The Presidents of the United States of America
5. "Soldiers" – You Am I
6. "Here We Go" – Shelter
7. "Punk Rock Song" – Bad Religion
8. "Let There Be Rock" – Hard-Ons
9. "Cromagnon Man" – Snout
10. "Jerks of Attention" – Jebediah
11. "Krupa (440 Edit)" – Apollo 440
12. "Born Slippy .NUXX (Short)" – Underworld
13. "Voodoo People" – The Prodigy
14. "Fire Water Burn" – Bloodhound Gang
15. "Breathing Through My Eyes" – Skunkhour
16. "Drugs" – Ammonia
17. "Tons of Bricks" – The Meanies
18. "Small" – Effigy
19. "Higher Than You Think" – Something for Kate

==== Disc 2 ====
1. "Place Your Hands" – Reef
2. "Hey Dude" – Kula Shaker
3. "It's Like Sound" – Automatic
4. "Don't Look Back in Anger" – Oasis
5. "Coppertone" – Fini Scad
6. "From Here on In" – The Living End
7. "Cult of Personality" – Living Colour
8. "Nearly Lost You" – Screaming Trees
9. "Interloper" – The Mark of Cain
10. "Not an Addict" – K's Choice
11. "Barrel of a Gun" – Depeche Mode
12. "Space Shanty" – Leftfield
13. "Dead Eyes Opened" – Severed Heads
14. "Effervescence" – Pollyanna
15. "Infatuation" – Moler
16. "I Am Awake" – Rail
17. "Where Did She Come From" – Hard-Ons
18. "Love Measurer" – Custard

=== Indie 2000 Volume 2 ===
==== Disc 1 ====
1. "The Beautiful People" – Marilyn Manson
2. "The Perfect Drug" – Nine Inch Nails
3. "Funky Shit" – The Prodigy
4. "Into My Arms" – Nick Cave
5. "Some Kind of Bliss" – Kylie Minogue
6. "Coma" – Pendulum
7. "Remember Me" – Blue Boy
8. "DC×3" – Grinspoon
9. "Abuse Me" – Silverchair
10. "Last Cup of Sorrow" – Faith No More
11. "Swallowed" – Bush
12. "Why's Everybody Always Pickin' on Me?" – Bloodhound Gang
13. "I Go Off" – Diana ah Naid
14. "Good God" – Korn
15. "Dance with the Devil (Radio Mix)" – Raggadeath
16. "A Life Less Ordinary" - Ash
17. "Here in Your Bedroom" – Goldfinger
18. "Early to Bed" – Morphine
19. "More than This" – 10,000 Maniacs

==== Disc 2 ====
1. "Military Strongmen" – Jebediah
2. "Naughty Boy" – The Mavis's
3. "Pulse" – Front End Loader
4. "There's Your Dad" – Frenzal Rhomb
5. "George" – Headless Chickens
6. "Isaac or Fuzz" – Machine Gun Fellatio
7. "Rabbit with Fangs" – Magic Dirt
8. "Smile" – Pangaea
9. "Sunbury '97" – The Fauves
10. "Debaser" – Pixies
11. "Lust for Life" – Iggy Pop
12. "(You Gotta) Fight for Your Right (To Party!)" – N.Y.C.C.
13. "Kool Thing" – Sonic Youth
14. "Bring Tha Noize" – Public Enemy featuring Anthrax
15. "When the Shit Goes Down" – Cypress Hill
16. "Somebody to Shove" – Soul Asylum
17. "Let It Slide" – Mudhoney
18. "Don't It Get You Down" – Deadstar
19. "Heaven" – Mr. Blonde
20. "Lose My Mind (A Friend In London)" – Bill
21. "Sometimes" – Brand New Heavies
22. "The Joker Is Wild" – Corduroy
23. "Fuck the Millennium" – 2K

=== Indie 2000 Volume 3 ===
==== Disc 1 ====
1. "Josie" – Blink-182
2. "Fight for Your Right (To Party)" – N.Y.C.C.
3. "It's Tricky (Jason's Slo-pocus Radio Mix)" – Run–DMC vs. Jason Nevins
4. "Walkin' on the Sun (Feet Beat Manifesto Mix)" – Smash Mouth
5. "Touch, Peel and Stand" – Days of the New
6. "Breathe" – Kylie Minogue
7. "Smack My Bitch Up (Edit)" – The Prodigy
8. "Brimful of Asha (Norman Cook Remix Single Version)" – Cornershop
9. "Not the Sunscreen Song" – John Safran
10. "One Headlight" – The Wallflowers
11. "Criminal (Radio Edit)" – Fiona Apple
12. "Change in Me" – Monique Brumby
13. "All for You" – Sister Hazel
14. "Bleed" – Soulfly
15. "Shake Hands with Beef" – Primus
16. "Wash It Away" – Black Lab
17. "100% Jesus" – Daniella's Daze
18. "Ready or Not (Radio Edit)" – manBREAK

==== Disc 2 ====
1. "Just Ace" – Grinspoon
2. "Mum Changed the Locks" – Frenzal Rhomb
3. "Got Sold on Heaven" – Snout
4. "She Riff" – Magic Dirt
5. "Jimmy Rogers" – Fur
6. "Roll Credit" – Something for Kate
7. "Music Is Crap" – Custard
8. "You Sound Like Louis Burdett" – The Whitlams
9. "Sirena" – Dirty Three
10. "Smokin' Johnny Cash" – The Blackeyed Susans
11. "Suspicion Bells" – Effigy
12. "Letter Never Sent" – Bodyjar
13. "Hi-C's" – Screamfeeder
14. "It's Not Real" – Fini Scad
15. "Red Light Disco" – Moler
16. "Lightning Crashes" – Live
17. "Jump Around (Master Mix)" – House of Pain
18. "You Are What You Is" – Frank Zappa
19. "Get Higher" – Black Grape
20. "Busy Child (Radio Edit)" – The Crystal Method
21. "I'm a Disco Dancer (And a Sweet Romancer) (Ernie's Edit)" – Christopher Just

=== Indie 2000 Volume 4 ===
==== Disc 1 ====
1. "Heavy Heart" – You Am I
2. "Black Friday" – Grinspoon
3. "Doctor Worm" – They Might Be Giants
4. "Pure Morning" – Placebo
5. "Every Day Should Be a Holiday" – The Dandy Warhols
6. "Shimmer" – Fuel
7. "Sweater" – Eskimo Joe
8. "Engel" – Rammstein
9. "Resurrection" – Fear Factory
10. "I Hate Stupid People" – Insurge
11. "California Stars" – Billy Bragg & Wilco
12. "Rachael" – Buffalo Tom
13. "Eat Me" – Arkarna
14. "Skankin' Carpark Blues" – The Porkers
15. "Tequila Sunrise" – Cypress Hill
16. "Revolution (Bring the Noise)" – Subsonic Legacy
17. "Baddest DJ on 2 Turntables" – Wax Assassins
18. "Banana Chips" – Shonen Knife
19. "No Surprises" – Even

==== Disc 2 ====
1. "Flagpole Sitta" – Harvey Danger
2. "Sex and Candy" – Marcy Playground
3. "Father of Mine" – Everclear
4. "My Favourite Game" – The Cardigans
5. "Thunderbirds Are Coming Out" – TISM
6. "Save Yourself" – Stabbing Westward
7. "Road Rage" – Catatonia
8. "If You Tolerate This Your Children Will Be Next" – Manic Street Preachers
9. "Drinking in L.A." – Bran Van 3000
10. "Charlie No. 3" – The Whitlams
11. "Cinnamon Lip" – Pollyanna
12. "The Ballad of Tom Jones" – Space with Cerys Matthews
13. "Party Hard" – Pulp
14. "No Logic" – Area-7
15. "Summertime" – The Sundays
16. "A Punk Named Josh" – Chopper One
17. "Black the Sun" – Alex Lloyd
18. "Hey Now Now" – Swirl 360
19. "Bradley" – Coal Chamber

=== Indie 2000 Volume 5 ===
==== Disc 1 ====
1. "Freak on a Leash" – Korn
2. "Never Had So Much Fun" – Frenzal Rhomb
3. "More Than You Are" – Grinspoon
4. "Don't Wanna Be Left Out" – Powderfinger
5. "When I Grow Up" – Garbage
6. "Jesus or a Gun" – Fuel
7. "Polyester Bride" – Liz Phair
8. "Shazam!" – Spiderbait
9. "Turn Up Your Stereo" – Eskimo Joe
10. "Stereo" – The Watchmen
11. "I Wanna Be a Nudist" – Regurgitator
12. "Hazy Shade of Winter" – Bodyjar
13. "Can't Get Enough" – Suede
14. "You Stole the Sun from My Heart" – Manic Street Preachers
15. "Heart and Shoulder" – Heather Nova
16. "Bitter Words" – Area-7
17. "Cha Cha Cha" – Grand Theft Auto
18. "Get Down" – Jungle Brothers
19. "Radio Funk" – Endorphin
20. "The Universe" – Snog
21. "Lift" – Sunk Loto
22. "Mystical Machine Gun" – Kula Shaker
23. "B-Line" – Lamb

==== Disc 2 ====
1. "Tender" – Blur
2. "Sheep Go to Heaven" – Cake
3. "Hallways" – Something for Kate
4. "Lucky Star" – Alex Lloyd
5. "Waltz #2" – Elliott Smith
6. "You Don't Care About Us" – Placebo
7. "What It's Like" – Everlast
8. "Right Here, Right Now" – Fatboy Slim
9. "Push Upstairs" – Underworld
10. "Theophilus Thistler (An Exercise in Vowels)" – Sonic Animation
11. "Touched" – VAST
12. "Action and Drama" – Bis (Some pressings featured the song 'Theme From Tokyo' by the same artist, however 'Action and Drama' is listed on the track list)
13. "Spray Water on the Stereo" – Turnstyle
14. "Young" – Primary
15. "Hit Song" – Custard
16. "Delicious" – Moler
17. "Crush" – Violetine
18. "Have Your Way" – Superheist
19. "Ladyfingers" – Luscious Jackson

=== Indie 2000 Volume 6 ===
==== Disc 1 ====
1. "Falling Away from Me" – Korn
2. "Guerrilla Radio" – Rage Against the Machine
3. "What's My Age Again?" – Blink 182
4. "Blue Monday" – Orgy
5. "Spit It Out (Overcaffeinated Hyper Version)" – Slipknot
6. "Underdog" – Testeagles
7. "Ready 1" – Grinspoon
8. "Ten Minutes" – The Get Up Kids
9. "Boredom" – The Tenants
10. "All Torn Down" – The Living End
11. "Second Class Citizen" – Area-7
12. "Pumping on Your Stereo" – Supergrass
13. "Didley Squat" – Sonic Animation
14. "Build It Up, Tear It Down" – Fatboy Slim
15. "Swastika Eyes (Edit)" – Primal Scream
16. "Rendez-Vu" – Basement Jaxx
17. "Supersonic (Radio Edit)" – Jamiroquai
18. "Mutha Fukka on a Motocycle" – Machine Gun Fellatio
19. "Comin' Up from Behind" – Marcy Playground
20. "Plastic" – Spiderbait
21. "Skin Tight" – The Donnas
22. "In the Middle" – Nitocris

==== Disc 2 ====
1. "Take a Picture" – Filter
2. "Miss You Love" – Silverchair
3. "Passenger" – Powderfinger
4. "Genre Casting" – Lo-Tel
5. "Burn to Shine" – Ben Harper
6. "Heaven Coming Down" – The Tea Party
7. "Every You Every Me" – Placebo
8. "Come Original" – 311
9. "Coffee & TV" – Blur
10. "Whatever You Want" – Something for Kate
11. "Stolen Car" – Beth Orton
12. "Ends" – Everlast
13. "Every Morning" – Sugar Ray
14. "You Gotta Love This City" – The Whitlams
15. "Don't Change Your Plans" – Ben Folds Five
16. "Cowboy" – Kid Rock
17. "Beautiful" – Joydrop
18. "Something Special" – Alex Lloyd

=== Indie 2000 Volume 7 ===
==== Disc 1 ====
1. "Yellow" – Coldplay
2. "Bohemian Like You" – The Dandy Warhols
3. "Slave to the Wage" – Placebo
4. "Damage" – You Am I
5. "Pacifier" – Shihad
6. "Dirty Jeans" – Magic Dirt
7. "Teenager of the Year" – Lo-Tel
8. "Teenage Dirtbag" – Wheatus
9. "Porcelain" – Moby
10. "The Time Is Now" – Moloko
11. "Music Is My Radar" – Blur
12. "Wasting My Life" – The Hippos
13. "Start Making Sense" – Area-7
14. "Set the Record Straight" – Reef
15. "Goodbye" – 28 Days
16. "Secrets" – Grinspoon
17. "Catch the Sun" – Doves
18. "Music Non Stop" – Kent
19. "Drive" – Chakradiva
20. "King of the DJ's" – Grand Theft Auto
21. "Too Big for Your Boots" – The Porkers

==== Disc 2 ====
1. "Renegades of Funk (Radio Edit)" – Rage Against the Machine
2. "Pictures in the Mirror" – The Living End
3. "Fall to the Ground" – Bodyjar
4. "Nothing's Wrong" – Frenzal Rhomb
5. "Please Leave" – Jebediah
6. "Make Me Bad (Sickness In Salvation Mix)" – Korn
7. "Every Fucking City" – Paul Kelly
8. "Wonderful" – Everclear
9. "Sunken Eyes" – Sunk Loto
10. "Crush the Losers" – Regurgitator
11. "The Best Things (Radio Edit)" – Filter
12. "Stellar" – Incubus
13. "Killing the Fly" – The Union Underground
14. "Holiday" – The Get Up Kids
15. "Go Let It Out!" – Oasis
16. "My Way Home" – Alex Lloyd
17. "Charlie's Angels 2000" – Apollo 440
18. "Never Gonna Come Back Down (Single Edit)" – BT featuring Mike Doughty
19. "Size Does Matter" – ONinc
20. "B.O.B (Radio Mix)" – OutKast
21. "Mind Bomb" – Oblivia

=== Indie Volume 8 ===
==== Disc 1 ====
1. "Clint Eastwood" – Gorillaz
2. "It Don't Matter" – Rehab
3. "Three Dimensions (Single Edit)" – Something for Kate
4. "The Drugs Don't Work" – Ben Harper
5. "Amazing" – Alex Lloyd
6. "Drive" – Incubus
7. "Little L (Single Edit)" – Jamiroquai
8. "Weapon of Choice" – Fatboy Slim
9. "Rock the Nation" – Michael Franti & Spearhead
10. "Special K" – Placebo
11. "Pace It" – Magic Dirt
12. "Get Off" – The Dandy Warhols
13. "Rose Rouge Pt. 1" – St Germain
14. "Rome Wasn't Built in a Day" – Morcheeba
15. "No Man's Woman" – Sinéad O'Connor
16. "AM Radio" – Everclear
17. "Godless" – U.P.O.
18. "Everything in Its Right Place" – Radiohead
19. "I Don't Care What Your Friends Say" – Soda Racer
20. "Much Against Everyone's Advice" – Soulwax

==== Disc 2 ====
1. "The Heretic Anthem" – Slipknot
2. "Dig" – Mudvayne
3. "Last Resort" – Papa Roach
4. "Stash Up" – OPM
5. "Little Things" – Good Charlotte
6. "Lonesome" – Unwritten Law
7. "No Cigar" – Millencolin
8. "Roll On" – The Living End
9. "Feed It" – Bodyjar
10. "40 Boys in 40 Nights" – The Donnas
11. "All My Best Friends Are Metalheads" – Less Than Jake
12. "I Hear You Calling" – Gob
13. "Killing Time" – Hed PE
14. "Charlotte" – Kittie
15. "Invisible Wounds (Dark Bodies)" – Fear Factory
16. "Rumba" – Ill Niño
17. "I'm with Stupid" – Static-X
18. "Turn Me On "Mr. Deadman" (Explicit Version)" – The Union Underground
19. "Again & Again" – Taproot
20. "Pain" – Stereomud
21. "Smash It Up" – The (International) Noise Conspiracy
22. "Die, All Right!" – The Hives
23. "Don't Call Me Baby" – Frankenbok

=== Indie Volume 9 ===
==== Disc 1 ====
1. "Cherry Lips (Go Baby Go!)" – Garbage
2. "Rockin' the Suburbs" – Ben Folds
3. "The Hindu Times" – Oasis
4. "This Mess We're In" – PJ Harvey
5. "Island in the Sun" – Weezer
6. "Souljacker Part I" – Eels
7. "Twenty Years" – Something for Kate
8. "Sexual Healing" – Ben Harper
9. "Lullaby" – The Tea Party
10. "Knives Out" – Radiohead
11. "Gabriel" – Lamb
12. "Roseability" – Idlewild
13. "Bliss" – Muse
14. "Economic Decline" – Rocket Science
15. "Shock" – Cartman
16. "Supagloo" – Magic Dirt
17. "Karma" – 1200 Techniques
18. "You Give Me Something" – Jamiroquai
19. "Superstylin'" – Groove Armada
20. "Man, It's So Loud in Here" – They Might Be Giants

==== Disc 2 ====
1. "Main Offender" – The Hives
2. "First Date" – Blink-182
3. "She's Got the Look" – Guttermouth
4. "Divine Intervention" – Pennywise
5. "Mean Girl" – Unwritten Law
6. "Fall Down" – Jebediah
7. "Say What?" – 28 Days featuring Apollo 440
8. "Hope Is Where the Heart Is" – Seraph's Coal
9. "Nice to Know You" – Incubus
10. "The Cell" – The Butterfly Effect
11. "Feel So Numb" – Rob Zombie
12. "Bodies" – Drowning Pool
13. "Sonne" – Rammstein
14. "Linchpin" – Fear Factory
15. "Synthetic" – Spineshank
16. "Squash That Fly" – Fu Manchu
17. "The Shame of Life" – Butthole Surfers
18. "Giving In" – Adema
19. "Flashback" – Tomahawk
20. "What I Always Wanted" – Kittie
21. "Burn Baby Burn" – Ash
22. "Killing Time" – Hed PE
