= Glee Sides and Sparities =

Compilation album of B-sides and Rarities by Jebediah
- Released: January 2003
- Genre: Alternative rock
- Length: 78:00
- Label: Murmur
- Producer: Shaun O’Callaghan; Matthew J. Dufty; Lindsay Gravina; Jebediah

Jebediah chronology
Jebediah (2002)	Glee Sides and Sparities (2003)	Braxton Hicks (2004)

Glee Sides and Sparities is a compilation album by Australian alternative rock band, Jebediah, released in January 2003. The compilation contains eighteen rare tracks and B-sides and the band did not record any further material with the Murmur label following its release.

Two newly released songs featured on the compilation: "Minutes" and "Pace It", a cover version of the Magic Dirt song.

== Track listing ==
No.	Title	original album	Length
1.	"Minutes"	new recording	3:22
2.	"Monument"	"Leaving Home" b-side	4:09
3.	"Television Lies"	"Fall Down" b-side	2:29
4.	"The Less Trusted Pain Remover"	"Animal" b-side	6:28
5.	"Pace It"	new recording	3:28
6.	"Tracksuit"	Twitch (EP)	4:25
7.	"Clint"	"Harpoon" b-side	5:18
8.	"Weekend Away"	"Military Strongmen" b-side	4:37
9.	"Hey Presto!"	"Fall Down" b-side	3:39
10.	"Bosco"	"Jerks of Attention" b-side	4:05
11.	"Supposed to Say"	"Animal" b-side	1:55
12.	"Jerks of Attention"	"Jerks of Attention" a-side	4:17
13.	"Smiler"	Twitch (EP)	2:42
14.	"Closing Time"	"Nothing Lasts Forever" b-side	5:51
15.	"Ski Trip"	"Harpoon" b-side	2:27
16.	"When the Generals Talk"	The Power & The Passion ...A Tribute To Midnight Oil	2:34
17.	"Thought About It"	"Leaving Home" b-side	3:17
18.	"Big Beer Wall"	Of Someday Shambles (hidden track)	2:49
