= Suburban Kid =

Studio album by Bob Evans
- Released: 8 September 2003
- Recorded: 2002–2003
- Genre: Folk pop
- Length: 54:30
- Label: Redline, Shock
- Producer: Bob Evans, Simon Struthers

Bob Evans chronology
Suburban Kid (2003)	Suburban Songbook (2006)

Singles from Suburban Kid
- 1. "Friday Come Five" Released: 18 August 2003; 2. "Turn" Released: late 2003

Suburban Kid is the debut solo album by the Australian singer-songwriter Kevin Mitchell, which was released under his pseudonym, Bob Evans. Mitchell is the lead vocalist of alternative rock group, Jebediah. The album was released on 8 September 2003 on Redline Records and was co-produced by Mitchell and Simon Struthers (Adam Said Galore). YourGigs website described it as "an album of youthful introspection, love and loss". Jason Ankeny (Allmusic) felt the album was "showcasing a more intimate, roots-flavored dimension of his songwriting". All the songs were written by Mitchell, although "The Hermit" was co-written with Luke Steele from The Sleepy Jackson. Luke's sister Katy Steele from Little Birdy provided backing vocals for the album.

The first single from the album, "Friday Come Five", was released 18 August 2003, with the second single, "Turn" released later in the year. Both tracks were put high rotation on Triple J when released and received solid support on Triple M and community radio stations around Australia. Film clips for both tracks aired on Rage, MTV Australia and CH[V]. In late 2003 Mitchell undertook a national acoustic tour, in support of the album's release, finishing up with a Festival of Perth performance alongside Evan Dando (The Lemonheads) and Tim Rogers (You Am I) in February 2004.

== Background ==
Suburban Kid is the debut album by Bob Evans, the pseudonym of Australian singer-songwriter, Kevin Mitchell, from Jebediah. Mitchell created the name as a side-project in 1999, to play incognito solo shows in Perth:

I didn’t really want to trade on Jebediah's name, I thought that doing a solo record as Kevin Mitchell from Jebediah was a statement that I really had no intention of making, this was a side project rather than trying to embark on a solo career.

From the age of 20, Mitchell had started to compile a list of acoustic guitar-based songs. They were inspired by his life in the Perth suburb of Bull Creek, Western Australia and by the age of 24 he had developed a concept for a solo album.

Suburban Kid was released on 8 September 2003 and was co-produced by Mitchell and Simon Struthers (Adam Said Galore). The first single, "Friday Come Five", was released ahead of the album on 18 August.

I think I wanted to release a song that was as different to Jebediah as I’ve got and "Friday Come Five" kinda fitted that bill. I just thought it was important for a song to be really, really different, something that would really stand out.

— Kevin Mitchell

The second single, "Turn" followed later in the year. Both tracks were put high rotation on radio station, Triple J, and received support on Triple M and community radio stations around Australia. The album was initially released by Redline Records and was subsequently re-released on 28 August 2006 by EMI Records following the success of his second Bob Evans album Suburban Songbook (2006). The suburban-based theme continued with his third album, Goodnight, Bull Creek! (2009).

Guest musicians on Suburban Kid include members of Jebediah, Ammonia, Adam Said Galore, Little Birdy, and End of Fashion. In late 2003 Mitchell undertook a national acoustic tour, in support of the album's release, finishing up with a Festival of Perth performance alongside Evan Dando (The Lemonheads) and Tim Rogers (You Am I) in February 2004.

== Reception ==
YourGigs website previewed Bob Evans' 2009 tour and described Suburban Kid as "an album of youthful introspection, love and loss". Jason Ankeny (Allmusic) felt it "[showcased] a more intimate, roots-flavored dimension of his songwriting". Perth Sounds reviewer opined "[it] is a more personal affair allowing him to write honestly about long distance relationships, personal faults, good friends".

== Track listing ==
All tracks are written by Kevin Mitchell, except as shown otherwise

Suburban Kid
No.	Title	Length
1.	"For Today"	3:52
2.	"My Big Mouth"	3:26
3.	"Friday Come Five"	4:31
4.	"She's Alone"	2:55
5.	"Turn"	4:17
6.	"Boy"	6:36
7.	"The Hermit" (Kevin Mitchell, Luke Steele)	4:56
8.	"Stevie's Song"	4:17
9.	"Heaven with You"	4:48
10.	"Ode to My Car"	5:14
11.	"Photographs"	4:18
12.	"Sore Eyes"	3:39

== Personnel ==
Credits according to album notes.

Musicians

- Alan Balmont – drums
- Billy Brothers – pedal steel guitar
- Justin Burford – backing vocals
- Michael Lake – drums
- Matt Maguire – drums
- Brett Mitchell – drums
- Kevin Mitchell (aka Bob Evans) – piano, Maton acoustic guitar, vocals, other sounds
- Katy Steele – backing vocals
- Simon Struthers – bass guitar, other sounds
- Vanessa Thornton – bass guitar

Production

- Andrew Christie – artwork
- Anthony Cormican – mastering at Loop Studios
- Kevin Mitchell – producer at Simon's Place, mixer
- Keli Morris – photography
- Simon Struthers – recording engineer, mixer, producer at his home studio (Simon's Place)

== Release history ==
Region	Date	Format	Label	Catalog No.
Australia	8 September 2003	CD	Redline	RED020
Australia	28 August 2006	CD	EMI	361288
