= Anniversary E.P. =

EP by Jebediah
- Released: 20 June 2005
- Recorded: May 2005
- Genre: Alternative rock
- Length: 21:55
- Label: Redline
- Producers: Jebediah; Dave Parkin

Jebediah chronology
Braxton Hicks (2004)	Anniversary E.P. (2005)	Kosciuszko (2011)

Anniversary E.P. is an EP by Australian alternative rock band Jebediah. It was released in 2005 by record label Redline, and was their last release before their hiatus, reforming in 2010.

The EP peaked at number 86 on the ARIA Singles Chart.

== Background and recording ==
To celebrate a decade of playing music as a band, Jebediah embarked on a national tour of Australia and released the EP to coincide with the occasion.

The EP was recorded in May 2005 and was self-produced by the band at Blackbird Studios in Perth, Western Australia.

== Content ==
Anniversary E.P. consists of five tracks: "More Alone" (from the 2004 album Braxton Hicks), "Patty Powell" (previously unreleased), and acoustic versions of a song from each of the albums that preceded Braxton Hicks—"Harpoon" (Slightly Odway), "Feet Touch the Ground" (Of Someday Shambles) and "Yesterday When I Was Brave" (Jebediah).

The cover art of the CD featured a constructed image of the Perth skyline and the inside of the cover featured a collage of photographs from the band's history that had been compiled by bassist, Vanessa Thornton.

== Release ==
Anniversary E.P. was released on 20 June 2005 by record label Redline, a licensing label that was co-owned by the band at the time. The EP peaked at number 86 on the ARIA Singles Chart.

== Track listing ==
No.	Title	Length
1.	"More Alone"	4:19
2.	"Patty Powell"	3:57
3.	"Harpoon (Acoustic Version)"	4:29
4.	"Yesterday When I Was Brave (Acoustic Version)"	3:57
5.	"Feet Touch the Ground (Acoustic Version)"	5:13

== Charts ==
Chart (2005)	Peak position
Australia (ARIA)	86
