= Letter Never Sent =

Letter Never Sent may refer to:

== Arts and media ==
- Letter Never Sent (film), a 1959 film directed by Mikhail Kalatozov
- "Letter Never Sent", an American television Covert Affairs episode
- "A Letter Never Sent", a short story by Rachel Swirsky
- Letters Never Sent (play), a play by Pamela Ribon

=== Music ===
- "Letter Never Sent", a song by R.E.M. on the album Reckoning
- "Letter Never Sent", a song by Bodyjar on the compilation Indie 2000
- Letters Never Sent, an album by Carly Simon

== See also ==
- Letters That Were Never Sent, a compilation album by SouthFM
- Unsent Letter (disambiguation)
