= Teflon (song) =

Single by Jebediah

from the album Slightly Odway
- Released: 23 March 1998
- Recorded: April 1997; Sing Sing Studios
- Genre: Alternative rock
- Length: 21:55
- Label: Murmur
- Songwriter(s): Chris Daymond, Kevin Mitchell, Vanessa Thornton, Brett Mitchell
- Producer(s): Neill King

Jebediah singles chronology
"Military Strongmen" (1997)	"Teflon" (1998)	"Harpoon" (1998)

"Teflon" is a song by Australian alternative rock band, Jebediah. "Teflon" was released on 23 March 1998 as the third single from the band's debut studio album, Slightly Odway and peaked at number 41 on the Australian ARIA Singles Chart. It polled at number 42 in the Triple J Hottest 100 music poll for 1998.

In October 1998 Jedediah performed "Teflon" at the ARIA Music Awards ceremony. A live version recorded in London was issued on a bonus disc of an extended version of their fifth studio album, Kosciuszko, in April 2011.

== Track listing ==
All tracks are written by Chris Daymond, Brett Mitchell, Kevin Mitchell and Vanessa Thornton

No.	Title	Length
1.	"Teflon"	3:48
2.	"Teflon" (Cooling Brothers Remix)	5:36
3.	"You"	3:17
4.	"Tracksuit" (Live at the Cornflakes)	4:26
5.	"Jerks of Attention" (Live at the Cornflakes)	4:48

== Credits ==
Jebediah members

- Chris Daymond – guitar
- Brett Mitchell – drums
- Kevin Mitchell – vocals
- Vanessa Thornton – bass guitar

Recording details

- Chris Lord-Alge – mixer
- Ben Steele – photography, artwork layout, design
- Andrew Christie – artwork layout, design
- Steve Smart – mastering
- Neill King – producer ("Teflon")
- Laurie Singara – producer ("You")
- Graham Hill – producer ("Tracksuit", "Jerks of Attention")

== Charts ==
Chart (1998)	Peak position
Australia (ARIA)	41
