= Unsent Letter =

Unsent Letter may refer to:

== Film ==
- The Unsent Letter, a 1959 film directed by Mikhail Kalatozov

== Music ==
- "Unsent Letter", a song on the Machine Gun Fellatio album Bring It On!
- Unsent Letters, an album by Pete Samples
- "The Unsent Letter", a song on The Strange Boys album Be Brave

== See also ==
- Letter Never Sent (disambiguation)
