= Oiks =

Studio album by Jebediah
- Released: 12 April 2024
- Length: 38:40
- Label: Cooking Vinyl Australia
- Producer: Jebediah; Anna Laverty; Dave Parkin

Jebediah chronology
Twenty (2015)	Oiks (2024)

Singles from Oiks
- 1. "Gum Up the Bearings" Released: 22 September 2023; 2. "Rubberman" Released: 15 November 2023; 3. "Motivation" Released: 16 February 2024

Oiks is the sixth studio album by Australian alternative rock band Jebediah. The album was announced on 15 November 2023 alongside the album's second single and was released on 12 April 2024. The album debuted and peaked at number 38 on the ARIA chart.

The album's title is a pet name given to the band by You Am I's Tim Rogers.

The album will be supported by a 22-date national album tour starting in July 2024.

== Reception ==
Double J said "Jebediah's long-awaited sixth album Oiks does not sound like the Jebediah of old" calling it "an album that covers a broad sonic gamut without ever feeling disjointed.". The review concluded with "Oiks proves that, almost 30 years into their career, Jebediah are untethered to their legacy. They're making the music that speaks to who they are now, thankfully that hasn't meant sacrificing quality.

Jeff Jenkins from Stack Magazine called the album "the band's most musically adventurous offering so far" ad called out the "range on display" through "Bad for You", "Rubberman" and "Aqua - Lung".

Greg Phillips from Australian Musician said "Oiks ultimately showcasing the band's enduring creativity while never losing sight of their influential indie and alternative rock roots."

Tone Jam said "Overall, Oiks is a strong return for Jebediah, showcasing their ability to evolve and grow while staying true to their roots. Fans of the band's earlier work will find much to love on this album, while newcomers will be drawn in by its infectious energy and emotional depth. Highly recommended for fans of Australian rock music."

== Track listing ==
All tracks are written by Jebediah.

No.	Title	Length
1.	"Bad for You"	4:25
2.	"Gum Up the Bearings"	4:14
3.	"Motivation"	3:32
4.	"Don't Stop"	3:38
5.	"Rubberman"	4:00
6.	"Iwannagetout"	2:30
7.	"April Slumber"	3:28
8.	"The Slip"	2:00
9.	"Okay, You Win"	2:58
10.	"Start Again"	3:02
11.	"Aqua - Lung"	4:48
Total length:		38:40

== Personnel ==
Jebediah

- Kevin Mitchell – lead vocals
- Chris Daymond – electric guitar
- Brett Mitchell – drums
- Vanessa Thornton – bass guitar

Additional musicians

- Thea Woodward – saxophone on "Gum Up the Bearings"
- Timothy Nelson – piano on "April Slumber"

Technical personnel

- Dave Parkin – production, mixing
- Jebediah – production
- William Bowden – mastering
- Anna Laverty – additional engineering and production
- Carl Breitkreuz – artwork and design
- Tajette O'Halloran – photography

== Charts ==
Weekly chart performance of Oiks
Chart (2024)	Peak position
Australian Albums (ARIA)	38
