= Jebediah =

Australian alternative rock band

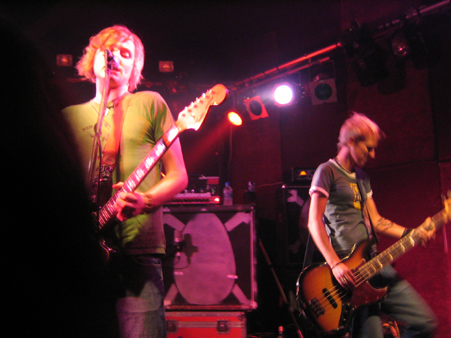
- Jebediah performing live, July 2005. Left to right: Kevin Mitchell and Vanessa Thornton

Background information
- Origin: Perth, Western Australia, Australia
- Genre: Alternative rock
- Years active: 1994–2005, 2010–present
- Labels: Murmur, Redline, Dew Process, Cooking Vinyl Australia
- Members: Kevin Mitchell; Chris Daymond; Vanessa Thornton; Brett Mitchell
- Past members: Almin Fulurija
- Website: jebediah.net

Jebediah are an Australian alternative rock band formed in 1994 in Perth, Western Australia. The band consists of Chris Daymond on lead guitar, Kevin Mitchell (aka Bob Evans) on lead vocals and rhythm guitar, and Vanessa Thornton on bass guitar. They were joined a year later by Kevin's older brother, Brett Mitchell, on drums. After winning the National Campus Band Competition, the group were brought to national attention when their 1996 single "Jerks of Attention" received heavy airplay on Australian alternative radio station Triple J – which was followed by their breakthrough debut album, Slightly Odway (8 September 1997).

The band released four studio albums by 2004: three entered the top ten on the ARIA Albums Chart; their second album, Of Someday Shambles (3 October 2000), is the highest charting at number two. After touring to celebrate their tenth anniversary, the band went on hiatus in 2005. Kevin Mitchell continued solo work under his pseudonym, Bob Evans. Kevin also appeared on a self-titled album in July 2010 by the Basement Birds, a supergroup which he formed with fellow musicians, Kavyen Temperley, Josh Pyke and Steve Parkin. Jebediah reconvened in 2010 and released their fifth studio album, Kosciuszko, in the following year, which charted in the ARIA top ten.

== History ==
=== 1994–1996: Formation, Twitch EP ===
Jebediah was formed in Perth in 1994 by Chris Daymond (ex-Hybrid) on lead guitar, Almin Fulurija on drums, Kevin Mitchell on vocals and rhythm guitar, and Vanessa Thornton (ex-Hybrid, lead guitar) on bass guitar, whilst they were still students at Leeming Senior High School. They are named after Jebediah Springfield, the fictional founder of Springfield on the American TV cartoon series, The Simpsons. Daymond and Mitchell had met in a theatre class at Leeming High School in their final year, while Daymond and Thornton knew each other from childhood and had been members of Hybrid.

By early 1995, Kevin's older brother, Brett Mitchell, replaced Fulurija because the latter would not turn up to practice sessions, Brett had been a drummer with various groups including The Jerk Offs. In May that year Jebediah performed their first gig, for a Leeming High School formal, at the Perth Sheraton Hotel, where they played cover versions of material by Green Day, Nirvana, Pearl Jam and The Smashing Pumpkins, and one original.

They won the Western Australian semi-finals of the 1995 Australian National Campus Band Competition and in October they won the national final in Lismore. This led to an opening slot on the Summersault Music Festival before high-profile bands, Beastie Boys, Foo Fighters and Sonic Youth. Brett explained in a 2011 interview: "In the very early days, everything was just a bit of a shock ... to us; it was like, it was either a shock, if it, if it actually happened, or it was, it seemed kind of absurd if someone was, ah, you know, putting an idea forward about how things would go".

In August 1996 Jebediah issued their debut five-track extended play, Twitch, which was produced by Chris Dickie (The Pogues, Morrissey, Header). According to Australian musicologist Ian McFarlane, Twitch contained "quirky tracks like 'Mister Masonic' and 'Tracksuit' and was a strong taster for the band's fuzzy pop".

In April that year they had signed to Murmur, a subsidiary label of Sony Music, on the basis of their live performances. They followed with a national tour alongside Snout, and Automatic. In 2004 Daymon recalled "our very first EP came out through Murmur. Right from the very start we never really self-financed any of our early material ... Thinking about it now, over the years, a lot of being in a band – for us – is touring and playing the shows; that's always done independently anyway". At the West Australian Music Industry Awards of 1996 they won their first WAMi for Best Stage Presence. Twitch debuted at number one on the local Perth singles chart. It appeared on the ARIA Singles Chart in the top 100.

=== 1997–2000: Slightly Odway, Of Someday Shambles, Jebediaries ===
Jebediah's first single, "Jerks of Attention", was released in December 1996 and appeared on the ARIA Singles Chart top 100 in the following month. It received national airplay on the Triple J radio network. The group's appearances at Homebake and the Big Day Out concerts as well as support slots for Soundgarden, Everclear, The Presidents of the United States of America, Silverchair and You Am I, further raised their public profile. Another single, "Leaving Home", was issued in June and reached the top 50. The group won two WAMi awards in 1997: Most Popular Band and Most Popular Song for "Jerks of Attention".

In September Jebediah issued their first studio album, Slightly Odway, with Neill King (The Smiths, Madness, Elvis Costello) producing. The album's title is "a comment on the slightly odd way they feel they approach life as well as music". It peaked at number seven on the ARIA Albums Chart and remained in the top 50 for 54 weeks. Popular tracks included "Leaving Home" and the third single, "Military Strongmen" (November 1997). Slightly Odway also reached number two on the ARIA alternative charts, and within four months it was certified gold.

Jonathan Lewis of Allmusic felt it showed them "as a talented young band, despite the flimsy songwriting and the lack of light and shade on the album". While Greg Lawrence at WHAMMO.com.au noted that it provides "a mature, complete range – from the early-penned punk mayhem of 'Blame' to the delicacy of the 'Twilight=Dusk', from the dark tones of 'Jerks of Attention' to the bright strains of radio hit 'Leaving Home'. The album does a great job of capturing the amazing live dynamic of the band".

"Leaving Home" was rated number 10 in the Triple J Hottest 100 music poll for 1997. Slightly Odway eventually received a double-platinum certificate (140,000 units shipped), with two more top 50 singles, "Teflon" (March 1998) and "Harpoon" (on the EP of the same name, June), adding to the group's chart success. Murmur label mates, Something for Kate, provided a cover version of "Harpoon" on the EP. Murmur also issued a split-EP with both versions of "Harpoon" backed with Something for Kate's "Clint" and Jebediah's cover version of that track.

Jebediah supported United States alternative rockers, The Smashing Pumpkins, on the Australian leg of their 1998 tour in May. Jebediah released their second album, Of Someday Shambles, in November 1999, with producer Mark Trombino (Knapsack, Blink 182). McFarlane noted that it "was brimming with youthful exuberance and feisty, melodic, guitar-based fuzzy punk-pop perfectly suited to the post-grunge alternative generation". Lawrence felt it was "sporting tonnes more light and shade than their first effort and stretching out in the studio ... honing its craft, growing up in public in the most enviable of ways".

The album peaked at number two on the ARIA Albums Chart – their highest peaking release – and remained in the top 50 for 25 weeks. While its lead single, "Animal" (August 1999), reached number 16 and is their highest charting single to date. The band toured Canada and New Zealand and won further WAMi awards with Best Video for "Harpoon", and Thornton winning Best Bass Player. By December 2000, Of Someday Shambles received a platinum certificate from ARIA.

The group started 2000 by playing its second Big Day Out tour. They continued touring internationally playing the US, Canada and New Zealand. Daymon recalled "There have been times, especially after Someday Shambles, when our popularity in Australia had really surprised us and we were playing to huge crowds at the Big Day Out and we'd had two really successful records. We were a little dismayed as to why we couldn't push it further into the overseas area. Unfortunately it seemed to be the politics of working with a record on a major label that held us back. It's not much of an incentive for a label overseas to make you a priority if a lot of the profit is going back to the company where the band is from". In August, the group issued a six-track split EP with Jimmy Eat World, Jebediah / Jimmy Eat World in the US through independent label, Big Wheel Recreation.

In October 2000 Sony issued a video compilation album, Jebediaries, in VHS format for PAL systems, which contained their music videos and concert footage. It was followed in December by the DVD version which added a bonus track, "Animal" (live). Andrew Siers at MichaelDVD described it as "mainly a collection of the band's greatest hits in video clip form, but in between songs it is also a documentary. These sections of the feature are quite interesting and kept my attention at all times".

=== 2001–2003: Self-titled album, split from Sony, Gleesides & Sparities ===
The band recorded their third studio album, Jebediah, from June to August 2001, with production by Magoo (Regurgitator, Spiderbait, Midnight Oil). The album was not released until March the following year. Lawrence opined that it "sees a band in their element, brimming with confidence. Led by the tracks 'Fall Down' and 'Nothing Lasts Forever'". Ed Nimmervoll at Howlspace described their aim "for the third album they resolved to try to have fun again, recorded relatively quickly". Whilst it debuted at number eight on the charts, it did not achieve gold status. Its lead single "Fall Down" had reached number 24 in late October 2001.

Music videos were filmed for the three singles released from the album, "Fall Down", "Nothing Lasts Forever" and "NDC". On 25 May 2002 the group were guest programmers on ABC-TV's video program, rage, and played 12 of their music videos including "Fall Down" and "Nothing Lasts Forever".

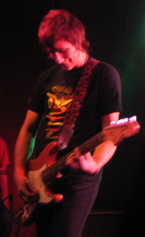
Chris Daymond at Rosemount Hotel, July 2005.

Glee Sides and Sparities, a compilation of B-sides and rare tracks, the band's final album with Murmur, was released in January 2003 and the band subsequently left Sony in the following month to continue as an independent act. Lawrence summarised "[it] combines the best b-sides and covers and adds the extra incentive of two fresh, unreleased tracks. For hungry Jebediah fans it will complete their collections and with 18 tracks there's plenty of fuzzy rock on offer".

=== 2004–2010: Braxton Hicks, 10th anniversary, Hiatus ===
In June 2004 Daymond told WHAMMO.com.au "I think [Sony Records] knew that we were looking to do something a little different. As a company they'd just gone through some major infrastructure changes in the last few years and I think by talking to us and realising that we were maybe not as happy as we were on the label when we signed – that the label had changed a lot and the roster was completely different". In an interview for Rolling Stone in May 2011, Thornton told music journalist, Andrew McMillen, that the band's manager at the time "couldn't be fucked fighting the label for anything that we wanted, and he'd made the decision that we were just going to go with whatever the label reckoned. Near the end, it was fucking soul-destroying for me".

In July 2004 Jebediah issued their fourth studio album, Braxton Hicks, which was produced by the band itself and appeared on their own record label, Redline Records, distributed by Shock Records. Redline Records had been set up in July 2000 with their then-manager, Heath Bradby, of Naked Ape Management. The album is named for the intermittent weak contractions which some pregnant women experience. Daymond reflected on the recording process "Because it was self-produced as well, there was no one in the producer's chair to tie the whole thing together. We've had to do that ourselves. We're a very close band but it was even more of a bonding experience in the recording studio, where we had to motivate each other to do our best and I think it's paid off".

Lawrence praised the group's decision to leave their previous label, "[they] seem reborn and the subsequent autonomy and enthusiasm have combined to deliver the bestest Jebs album in memory ... [they] have reached that point where every element is under their control – from production to business – and if Braxton Hicks is the end product of that control, every signed band should rip up their major label contracts immediately". It debuted at number 26 while its lead single, "First Time", made the top 50. During August and September that year they toured Australia to promote the album. In June 2005 Jebediah launched their 10-year anniversary tour and released the five-track Anniversary E.P. to coincide. Their shows consisted mainly of B-sides and rarities which fans had requested on the band's official internet forums.

In late 2005, after completing their 10th-anniversary tour, Jebediah decided to take an indefinite break. While a member of Jebediah, Kevin Mitchell had started a parallel solo career using the pseudonym, Bob Evans, from 1999. His first solo album Suburban Kid was issued in September 2003. During 2006 to 2007, Kevin released and then promoted his second solo album, Suburban Songbook and had relocated to Melbourne in 2008. Brett began drumming for Perth band, The Fuzz. Thornton joined Felicity Groom's backing band, The Black Black Smoke. That group includes Alex Archer (The Kill Devil Hills), Andrew Ryan (Adam Said Galore) and Mat Marsh. In 2009 they won a WAMi Award for Best Indie Pop Act.

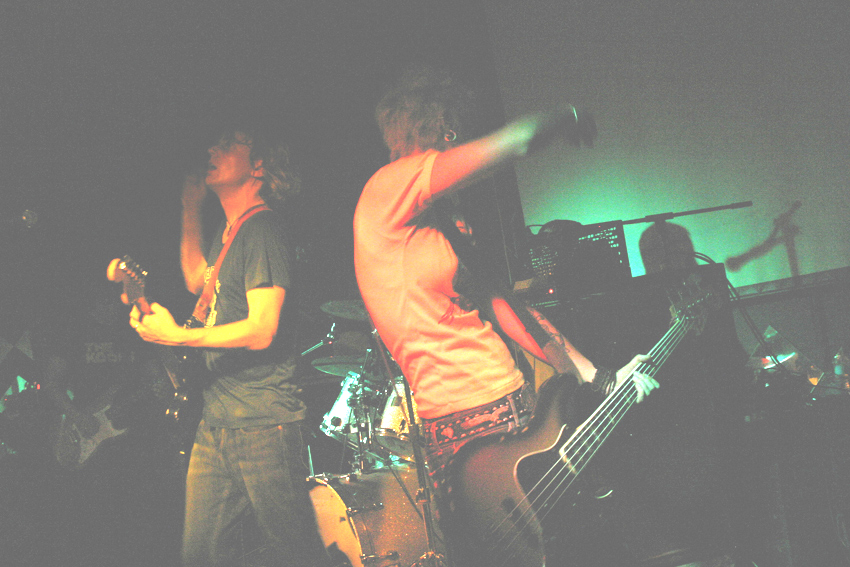
Jebediah, performing in November 2007. Left to right: Daymond (darkened), Kevin Mitchell, Brett Mitchell (obscured behind his drum kit), Vanessa Thornton.

Aside from Jebediah commitments, Daymond works in a record store in Perth. Following Mitchell's 2007 solo tour, he said that Jebediah would return to start recording their next album. They returned for a festival appearance at the Rollercoaster 07 Music Carnival, held at the Western Foreshore in Mandurah on 29 December, where they appeared alongside Hilltop Hoods, The Black Keys, Shihad, Kisschasy, Birds of Tokyo and Ash Grunwald. In September 2008 the group also played gigs in Sydney, Melbourne, and Brisbane. The shows were sold out despite little advertising and largely relying on word of mouth.

Kevin released his third studio album, Goodnight, Bull Creek!, in April 2009. The following year, he formed Basement Birds with Kavyen Temperley of Eskimo Joe, Josh Pyke, and Steve Parkin (studio musician for Goodnight, Bull Creek). They released their debut self-titled album in July 2010 and played a headlining tour in addition to festival dates.

=== 2011–present: Reunion, Kosciuszko and Oiks ===
Jebediah returned to the studio in 2010 to rehearse old material and write more music for their fifth studio album, Kosciuszko, which appeared on 15 April 2011 on the Dew Process label. Due to Kevin's other musical commitments, recording for the album had occurred sporadically since early 2008. Kosciuszko was produced by the group members, who created it without any time constraints. Brett explained in a 2011 interview:

The best thing for us was the freedom we had to make it. We had all the time we wanted on it. With Kevin being in Melbourne we'd take a week here and there and we could work and shape the songs more with that freedom and time ... there were periods where, for example, Kevin was the only one in the studio with the rest of us all working or doing whatever.

According to Brett Mitchell, all four band members were satisfied with the outcome of the recording sessions and it was "a more unanimous feeling than it has been in the past." Kevin also reflected on making the album:

It's a very different record for us and I'm really excited about it. It's the first real "studio" album we have ever made. Every other album has been recorded quite traditionally. We write a bunch of songs, play them live a bunch of times and then go in to studio and bash them out in a few weeks. This time round we had barely played the songs live, we wrote a few of them in the studio and we really used the studio as an instrument.

The album debuted at number six and stayed in the top 50 for five weeks. Richard Kingsmill premiered the lead single, "Lost My Nerve", on his Triple J music show on 17 October 2010. The second single, "She's Like a Comet", was released in January 2011, with an accompanying music video, and became the most added single to radio airplay. "She's Like a Comet" peaked at number four on the ARIA Australian Artists Singles Chart, number 47 on the ARIA Singles Chart, and reached number 29 on the Australian Music Report Top 100 Airplay Chart.

The group toured nationally to promote the album throughout the remainder of 2011, playing at the Splendour in the Grass festival and then visiting regional locations from Broome to Mount Hotham. They also performed at the National Youth Week 2011 launch event in Melbourne and appeared on morning TV program, Sunrise, to perform "She's Like a Comet". Matt Hogan of X-Press magazine attributed the success of the fifth album to Kevin's solo work as Bob Evans, and as a member of the Basement Birds.

On 13 April 2011, the band uploaded a 13-minute documentary film onto YouTube, Welcome to Kosciuszko, which was released in conjunction with Dew Process and filmed by an Australian-based production company, The Grindhouse (directed by Brent Quincy Buchanan and filmed by Harry Joaquin Charnock). It relates the band's history, featuring interviews with all four members.

Released following the band's hiatus, the documentary serves as both a re-introduction of the band to the public arena, but also a reflection upon the past. Thornton described her perspective:

We were so caught up in our own wild ride that we were being swept along doing what we were doing, and, I mean, at the time, we were meeting all these bands that we idolised and, and, were big fans of ... and, um, got to play gigs with them all ... The first tour we went on, then led into the next tour and, before we knew it, we were on the road to pretty much ten years solid.

Kevin explained:

We didn't really have aspirations to make records at that point, when we first started out; it was all about playing live, really. You know, enjoying each other's company, and writing songs, and gettin' stoned, partying and having fun ... Once we started, which was 1996, we didn't really stop until 2005. And, yeah, like I said, we were proud of how much we toured. We were-it was a badge of honour to play as much as possible.

Daymond reflected:

Without, sort of, having to organise it too much, we were all committed to the band to see how far it would go; and I think everyone was really happy with where it ended up taking us ... We were 17 when we started touring, um ... it was really awesome to be involved with a label like Murmur as well—Murmur had a lot of really cool bands on the roster; I mean, just getting invited to see a Silverchair gig, or something like that, was really exciting.

The band's perspective on the Murmur label is further elucidated; Thornton states: "There's no way we would've done what we did if Murmur wasn't our label", while Brett explained: "Because even though they were part of a much bigger company [Sony], um, we were shielded from a lot of that".

On 28 September 2012 Jebediah performed at the Rock Lily venue, part of the Star Casino complex in Sydney with The Sculptures and Conrad Greenleaf as their support acts. On 24 November they played at the Super Saturday horse racing event at the Ascot Raceway, Perth.

In January 2013 on web-based publication, Tone Deaf, Kevin described the songwriting process with his "best mates" as "a real democratic process, it's like trying to pass legislation". Kevin elaborated on the future of the group in March while promoting his fourth solo (Bob Evans) album: "I don't know, I like to think there will be [more to come]. I'd love to make another Jebediah record but at this stage we haven't even got together or started writing or anything yet so it's too far away to really be able to tell".

During January 2014 the band played locations in New South Wales, from Dee Why to Ulladulla. On 23 August 2014, Jebediah was the headline act at the Eaton Hills "FMX Extreme Weekend" in Queensland, Australia.

In March 2015 Jebediah announced that they would be undertaking a 20th Anniversary tour in June that year, performing fan favourites and surprises in the first set, then their 1997 debut album Slightly Odway in its entirety. To coincide with the tour they announced that they would be releasing a new compilation album, Twenty, on 29 May.

In September 2023, Jebediah released "Gum Up the Bearings", their first new single in over a decade. That same month, it was announced that the band would be inducted into the WAM Hall of Fame that November. Following a national tour in support of "Gum Up the Bearings", the band announced their sixth studio album OIKS. It is set for release on 12 April 2024 via Cooking Vinyl Australia. To coincide with the announcement, the band also shared a new single entitled "Rubberman".

== Cover versions ==
In June 1998 Something for Kate recorded a cover version of "Harpoon" which was released on the Harpoon EP alongside Jebediah's version. Jebediah provided a cover version of Something for Kate's track "Clint" on a split EP which also had each bands' versions of "Harpoon". In September 1998 Australian band Ratcat covered "Blame" from Slightly Odway and released it as a B-side.

Jebediah performed a cover version of the Bacharach and David-written track, "Raindrops Keep Fallin' on My Head", for Triple J's "Like a Version" radio segment – it was compiled on the various artists' album Like a Version, which was issued in 2005. In the following year Gyroscope covered "Monument" (B-side of "Leaving Home", 1997) which was compiled on Like a Version: Volume Two. Jebediah's version of "Apartment" (1995 single) by Custard appeared on Like a Version: Volume Eight (2012). In 2011 The Grates performed a cover version of "Please Leave" for a "Like a Version" segment.

== Redline Records ==
In July 2000 Jebediah, in partnership with Naked Ape Management (run by their talent manager, Heath Bradby), launched an independent licensing label, Redline Records, which was distributed through the Australian company, Shock Records. Kevin explained:

I think we were all pretty naive about what we, what we were achieving—we were having too much fun to get kind of caught up. We'd just released our second album overseas on an independent label; and, spent time in America as an independent act. And that was around about the time where we started our own label, just to, um, release, maybe, release a few, some bands of friends of ours, in bands.

Before the official dissolution of the label in December 2011, Redline Records had released recordings from Adam Said Galore, Jimmy Eat World, Blueline Medic, Big Heavy Stuff, Gyroscope, and Sekiden. It also released Jebediah's fourth album, Braxton Hicks (July 2004), and their Anniversary E.P. (June 2005).

== Other projects ==
Jebediah members have been involved in various other projects. Kevin has achieved commercial success with his solo project, Bob Evans. His fourth studio album, Familiar Stranger, appeared in March 2013. It was preceded by an EP, The Double Life, in November 2012 and a national tour of Australia. Kevin stated during an "Unplugged and Wired" performance for Google+ on 28 November 2012 that the EP's title applied to both his concurrent work with Jebediah, in addition to his new role as father and husband.

Brett and Thornton have joined an English singer–songwriter, Addison Axe, to form a group, Axe Girl; which is based in Perth. They have performed at local venues, including Hyde Park Hotel. They released their debut EP, Ghost Romance, as a free download in October 2012, which was launched at The Norfolk Basement Hotel, Fremantle.

Ghost Romance was accompanied by a video scrapbook showing excerpts from the recording process, which was uploaded to the band's YouTube page. By 24 October 2012, the band had signed with Perth music management company, Tyranocorp (Cal Peck & The Tramps, Fear of Comedy). In September 2013, they published photos from a video shoot for their track, "Give Me Your Tee Shirt", which was filmed in Perth. The band's self-titled debut album—funded by a crowdfunding campaign—is scheduled for an 8 November 2014 release, followed by a national Australian tour.

Thornton has also played with other Perth-based groups: End of Fashion, and Felicity Groom and the Black, Black Smoke. In a September 2009 interview, Thornton revealed that "Chris mostly keeps to himself and does his crazy paintings". As of 2012, Daymond is a member of a Nirvana cover band, Nirvanarama (not to be confused with an Ipswich, United Kingdom band of that name), alongside members of other groups, Gyroscope and Karnivool. Nirvanarama's debut live performance was in December 2011 at The Hen House, Perth. The group maintains a Facebook fan page and a Twitter account.

== Personal lives ==
Kevin married long-term girlfriend, Kristen, in November 2006 and in December 2008 they relocated from Perth to Seddon, an inner-west suburb of Melbourne. As of March 2013, Kevin and Kristen are the parents of a baby, and reside in Deer Park. Speaking on his personal life prior to the release of Familiar Stranger, Kevin revealed "I have zero social life. I have no hobbies, I have nothing else except making music and being a father". Kevin relocated with his family to coastal Victoria in early 2014.

Daymond married his partner, Belinda, in a Western Australian outdoor location, The Quarry, in December 2012, with Kevin and Thornton in attendance. An Irish dance performance was part of the wedding ceremony.

== Members ==
- Chris Daymond – guitar, backing vocals, percussion (1994–2005, 2010–present)
- Brett Mitchell – drums, backing vocals (1995–2005, 2010–present)
- Kevin Mitchell – lead vocals, guitar (1994–2005, 2010–present)
- Vanessa Thornton – bass guitar (1994–2005, 2010–present)

Former members

- Almin Fulurija – drums (1994–1995)

== Discography ==
- Slightly Odway (1997)
- Of Someday Shambles (1999)
- Jebediah (2002)
- Braxton Hicks (2004)
- Kosciuszko (2011)
- Oiks (2024)

== Awards and nominations ==
=== APRA Awards ===
Jebediah have received two nominations for Australasian Performing Right Association (APRA) Awards.

Year	Nominee / work	Award	Result
2012	"She's Like a Comet" (Christopher Daymond, Brett Mitchell, Kevin Mitchell (aka Bob Evans), Vanessa Thornton)	Most Played Australian Work	Nominated
2012	"She's Like a Comet" (Christopher Daymond, Brett Mitchell, Kevin Mitchell (aka Bob Evans), Vanessa Thornton)	Rock Work of the Year	Nominated
2012	"She's Like a Comet" (Christopher Daymond, Brett Mitchell, Kevin Mitchell (aka Bob Evans), Vanessa Thornton)	Song of the Year	Shortlisted

=== ARIA Awards ===
Jebediah have received five nominations for Australian Recording Industry Association (ARIA) Awards.

Year	Nominee / work	Award	Result
1997	"Jerks of Attention"	Best New Talent	Nominated
1998	Slightly Odway	Breakthrough Artist – Album	Nominated
2004	Braxton Hicks	Best Independent Release	Nominated
2004	Matt Lovell – Braxton Hicks	Engineer of the Year	Nominated
2011	Kosciuszko	Best Rock Album	Nominated

=== West Australian Music Industry Awards ===
The Western Australian Music Industry Awards (commonly known as WAMis) are annual awards presented to the local contemporary music industry, put on by the Western Australian Music Industry Association Inc (WAM). Jebediah has won eight awards

Year	Nominee / work	Award	Result (wins only)
1996	Jebediah	Best Stage Presence	Won
1997	Jebediah	Most Popular Band	Won
1997	"Jerks of Attention"	Most Popular Song	Won
1999	"Harpoon"	Best Local Video Clip	Won
1999	Vanessa Thornton (Jebediah)	Best Female Bass Player	Won
2002	Vanessa Thornton (Jebediah)	Best Female Original Bass Player	Won
2005	Vanessa Thornton (Jebediah)	Best Original Bass Player	Won
2011	"She's Like a Comet"	Most Popular Single	Won
2023	Jebediah	Hall of Fame	inducted

=== International Songwriting Competition (ISC) ===
- 2011 – Rock – "She's Like a Comet"

== See also ==
- Bob Evans
