= She's Like a Comet =

Single by Jebediah

from the album Kosciuszko
- Released: 2 February 2011
- Genre: Indie rock; pop
- Length: 3:42
- Label: Dew Process
- Songwriter(s): Chris Daymond; Brett Mitchell; Kevin Mitchell; Vanessa Thornton
- Producer(s): Dave Parkin; Jebediah

Jebediah singles chronology
"Lost My Nerve" (2010)	"She's Like a Comet" (2011)	"Gum Up the Bearings" (2023)

"She's Like a Comet" is a song by Australian alternative rock band, Jebediah, released on 2 February 2011 as the second and final single from the band's fifth studio album, Kosciuszko..

At the 2011 West Australian Music Industry Awards, the song won Most Popular Single.

== Background ==
Lead singer and lyricist, Kevin Mitchell, has revealed that the song was written in a very short timespan, with identical chords for both the verses and chorus. In an interview with Hit List TV, Mitchell disclosed that he had only become aware of the unchanging song structure following the recording process.

== Chords ==
Also in the online Hit list TV interview, Mitchell revealed the chord progression as "E, F# minor and A", with the same sequence used for the span of the entire song.

== Music video ==
The music video was filmed in Sydney, and is a homage to both manga and giant monster films. The video features a female superhero who is played by Alycia Debnam-Carey (in contrast to the male from the "Leaving Home" music video), who eventually prevails over a giant monster within a miniature cityscape. The video was directed by Alex Ryan and produced Jiao Chen.

== Awards ==
The song was the "First Prize" winner in the "Rock Category" for the International Songwriting Contest (ISC).

"She's Like A Comet" was nominated for the "Most Played Australian Work" and "Rock Work of the Year" at the 2012 APRA (Australasian Performing Right Association) Music Awards.

== Track listing ==
All tracks are written by Chris Daymond, Brett Mitchell, Kevin Mitchell and Vanessa Thornton

No.	Title	Length
1.	"She's Like a Comet"	3:42

== Charts ==
Chart (2011)	Peak position
Australia (ARIA)	47
