= Moler =

Australian power pop band

- Also known as: Snuff
- Origin: Melbourne, Victoria, Australia
- Genres: Indie pop; power pop
- Years active: 1993–2001, 2018–present
- Label: Infectious/Mushroom/Sony
- Spinoff of: the Stiff Kittens; Kick House
- Members: Helen Cattanach; Julien Poulson
- Past members: David Peacock; Stephen Boyle; Neil Lynch; Stuart Wilson; Mike Glenn; Jason Mills; Matt Heydon; Geoffrey Dunbar; Steve Thomas

Moler, previously called Snuff, are an Australian indie power pop band which formed in 1993 as a three-piece with founding mainstays Helen Cattanach on bass guitar and lead vocals and Julien Poulson on lead guitar. They had a changing line-up of drummers and sometimes worked as a four-piece with a keyboardist. Their sole studio album during their first incarnation, Golden Duck, was released in October 1997 via Infectious/Mushroom with Lindsay Gravina producing. They also issued eight extended plays (EPs) before they disbanded in 2001.

At the ARIA Music Awards of 1998, Golden Duck was nominated for the Best Rock Album. In November they opened the Mushroom 25 Live concert. According to Australian musicologist, Ian McFarlane, "[they] built-up a buzz around the [local] independent scene with [their] mix of noisy guitar fuzz, hard-driving beats, strident pop melodies and Cattanach's alternately sweet'n'purring and aggressive vocals." Moler reformed in 2018, released another EP and performed periodically thereafter.

In March 2026, Moler released their second studio album 69.

== History ==
=== 1993–1995: Snuff ===
Moler were formed as an indie guitar pop trio, Snuff, in Melbourne in 1993 by Helen Cattanach on bass guitar and lead vocals, David Peacock on drums and Julien Poulson on lead guitar. Cattanach (ex-T-Bones) and Poulson (ex-Snappers) had been members of the Stiff Kittens, which gigged in Melbourne before relocating to Hong Kong where the pair formed Kick House. The pair reformed the Stiff Kittens in London in 1992 with Rob "Viva" Lastdrager on drums and vocals (ex-Snappers, T-Bones) and Richard Webb on lead vocals and guitar (ex-Strange Fruit, T-Bones). That group issued an extended play, As You Walk, via London-based label, Psychic Records. The members returned to Australia. In 1994, Snuff released a five-track EP, Driven, via Fat Buddha Records with Lindsay Gravina producing.

=== 1995–2001: Moler ===
Early in 1996, Snuff changed their name to Moler, with the same line-up and were signed to Infectious/Mushroom. Moler's next EP with five tracks, On Special, was released in June 1996; Australian musicologist Ian McFarlane found "The lead-off track, 'Shopping Trolley', displayed plenty of appeal." Another five-track EP, Coaster, followed in September. The group toured with fellow local bands, Snout and Magic Dirt, and supported gigs by international artists, Weezer, Everclear, Ash and Garageland. Early in 1997 Peacock was replaced on drums by Steve Boyle. Over their history they had a succession of drummers.

Their fourth EP, Infatuation, with four tracks was issued in May 1997. Its title track was placed on high rotation by national youth radio station, Triple J. Marta of Tharunka observed, "Boyle has added a funkier beat to [their] already catchy suburban sound, completing the Australian pop-punk trio with flawless precision." Moler followed with their debut album, Golden Duck in October via Infectious/Mushroom/Sony with Gravina producing. Music journalist Jeff Jenkins rated it as "very good" and explained, "[it's] a mass of contradictions: part power-pop, part dreamy and moody. Part slacker, part ambition."

After the album appeared, Boyle was replaced by Neil Lynch on drums and they added Matt Heydon (ex-Nick Barker and the Reptiles) on keyboards. At the ARIA Music Awards of 1998, Golden Duck was nominated for the Best Rock Album. In November they opened the Mushroom 25 Live concert. They found a new drummer in early 2000, with Mike Glenn (ex-Hoss) joining, in time for a tour of the United States in March. In 2001 the group released their eighth EP, Red & White Stripes, before disbanding in that year.

=== 2001–2018: Afterwards ===
The Stiff Kittens issued a compilation album, Greatest Trips, in 2007 via Killer Music with Cattanah and Poulson joined by various line-ups, Greg Baxter on bass guitar and vocals; Lastdrager on drums and vocals; James McHugh on bass guitar and vocals; and Webb on vocals and guitar.

=== 2018–present: Reformation ===
Moler reformed for a show on 23 November 2018 at The Curtin Hotel, Carlton, Melbourne to celebrate the 25th anniversary of their formation. Cattanach and Poulson were joined by Boyle and Peacock, who took turns drumming. They released a digital three-track EP, Work in October 2019. Moler continue to perform periodically.

== Discography ==
=== Albums ===
Title	Album details
Golden Duck	Released: October 1997; Label: Infectious Records (dinf 013); Format: CD
69	Released: 6 March 2026; Label: (PRR001); Format: digital, LP

=== Extended plays ===
Title	Album details
Driven (by Snuff)	Released: 1995; Label: Fat Buddha Records (FB004); Format: CD
On Special	Released: June 1996; Label: Infectious Records (DINF002); Format: CD, 10" LP
Coaster	Released: September 1996; Label: Infectious Records (DINF005); Format: CD
Infatuation	Released: May 1997; Label: Infectious Records (DINF010); Format: CD
Invite Me To Your Party	Released: mid-1997; Label: Infectious Records (DINF011); Format: CD
Red Light Disco	Released: April 1998; Label: Infectious Records (DINF016); Format: CD
Delicious	Released: 1998; Label: Infectious Records (DINF024); Format: CD
Red & White Stripes	Released: 2001; Label: Sixpack (SIXPACK 002); Format: CD
Work	Released: October 2019; Label: Moler; Format: Digital

== Awards and nominations ==
=== ARIA Music Awards ===
The ARIA Music Awards are a set of annual ceremonies presented by Australian Recording Industry Association (ARIA), which recognise excellence, innovation, and achievement across all genres of the music of Australia. They commenced in 1987.

Year	Nominee / work	Award	Result	Ref.
1998	Golden Duck	Best Rock Album	Nominated	
