= Braxton Hicks (album) =

Studio album by Jebediah
- Released: 12 July 2004
- Recorded: January–February 2004
- Genre: Alternative rock
- Length: 40:49
- Label: Redline
- Producer: Jebediah

Jebediah chronology
| Glee Sides and Sparities (2003) | Braxton Hicks (2004) | Anniversary E.P. (2005) |

Singles from Braxton Hicks
- 1. "First Time" Released: 24 May 2004; 2. "No Sleep" Released: 1 August 2004

Professional ratings
Review scores
| Source | Rating |
|---|---|
| FasterLouder | favourable |

Braxton Hicks is the fourth studio album by Australian alternative rock band Jebediah. It was recorded between January and February 2004 and released on 12 July 2004 by record label Redline, a defunct independent record label that was co-owned by the band, making it the band's first independent release.

== Recording ==
The album was recorded in January and February 2004 and was co-produced by the band together with engineer Matt Lovell (Silverchair, Something for Kate, The Mess Hall), in a converted Masonic Lodge (Kingdom Studios) located in the inner Perth suburb of Maylands. The album was mixed by Shaun O'Callaghan (John Butler, Eskimo Joe, Gyroscope) at Studio Couch in North Fremantle.

== Content ==
Braxton Hicks, as the band have explained, are the false labour contractions some women experience before childbirth, named after the 19th-century English doctor who "discovered" them. Mitchell was struck by the term when he read it in a medical book. He explains, "We saw it as an analogy for songwriting in that the songwriting process is like the contractions, and the end product, the song, is like the child. And you can take it as far as you want really."

== Promotion ==
The first single, "First Time", released on 24 May 2004, reached No. 50 on Australian ARIA Singles Charts. The second single, "No Sleep", was released 1 August 2004 and did not chart on the mainstream charts but entered Triple J's Net 50 at No. 8. It is featured on the 2006 WAMi dual disc compilation Kiss My WAMi 2006, with the audio on the CD album and its video on the DVD. Bass guitarist Vanessa Thornton was nominated for a WAMi Award for 'Best Bassist'.

== Release ==
Braxton Hicks was released on 12 July 2004 by record label Redline. It was the first album released by Jebediah following the band's status as an independent band; the band's longtime label Murmur (a subsidiary of Sony Music Australia) ceased contractual arrangements in 2002. Bassist Vanessa Thornton has since stated that she was unhappy with Sony's promotion of the band's previous, self-titled album, a history that also involved the band's manager at the time.

It entered the Australian charts at No. 26, a poor result given that the band's first two albums had debuted in the top ten. However, the band estimated that it could break even with fewer sales as an independent act than on a major label.

Initial copies of the album were released with a bonus DVD, The Winnie Cobb Sessions (the name "Winnie Cobb" is, according to the band's manager at the time, associated with the band's tour of the United States and refers to a guru-type figure). The DVD features the band at Perth's Blackbird Studios (the band would record its next album at the same recording studio) performing songs from the Braxton Hicks writing and recording period.

== Track listing ==
All tracks are written by Jebediah

| No. | Title | Length |
|---|---|---|
| 1. | "More Alone" | 4:19 |
| 2. | "Loaded Gun" | 4:14 |
| 3. | "It's Over" | 4:19 |
| 4. | "No Sleep" | 3:40 |
| 5. | "Sew Your Life" | 4:12 |
| 6. | "First Time" | 4:13 |
| 7. | "Braxton Hicks" | 3:53 |
| 8. | "The Seven Signs of Ageing" | 4:14 |
| 9. | "You Oughtta Know" | 3:42 |
| 10. | "Nothing" | 3:56 |

== Charts ==
| Chart (2004) | Peak position |
|---|---|
| Australian Albums (ARIA) | 26 |
