= Kosciuszko (album) =

Studio album by Jebediah
- Released: 15 April 2011
- Recorded: 2010–2011
- Genre: Alternative rock
- Length: 41:38
- Label: Dew Process
- Producer: Jebediah

Jebediah chronology
Anniversary E.P. (2005)	Kosciuszko (2011)	Twenty (2015)

Singles from Kosciuszko
- 1. "Lost My Nerve" Released: 19 November 2010; 2. "She's Like a Comet" Released: 31 January 2011

Kosciuszko is the fifth studio album by Australian alternative rock band Jebediah. Released on 15 April 2011, by Dew Process, the album introduced the award-winning band to mainstream audiences and commercial success.

== Background and recording ==
Even though Jebediah took five years to re-enter the studio after the release of their Anniversary E.P. (2005), the band began drafting the songs as early as 2006. Between the two albums, the band took a break, with lead singer–rhythm guitarist Kevin Mitchell relocating to Melbourne during the hiatus.

Recording occurred at Blackbird Studios in Perth, Australia, and production duties were undertaken by Dave Parkin (owner of the studio) in collaboration with the band. Kevin Mitchell revealed in a radio interview:

It's probably the only time we've ever made a record where it was actually finished when it was finished. Every other time you're pretty much given a month or a two month block. When that last day ticks over the record is finished; whether it's finished or not. So this was an absolutely luxury to do it that way.

== Promotion and release ==
Professional ratings
Review scores
Source	Rating
The AU Review	7/10
Beat	A+
The Brag	(favourable)
Eleven Magazine	(favourable)
FasterLouder	(favourable)
The Music Network	(favourable)
Music Universe	(favourable)
Space Ship News	(favourable)
The Vine	(mixed)

Kosciuszko was released on 15 April 2011 by record label Dew Process. On each of the twelve days leading up to the album's release, a short video (around one minute) was uploaded to the band's YouTube page, in which the band provides insight into each of the album's songs.

Its first single "She's Like a Comet" quickly became a hit, and the band performed the song on Australian morning television program Sunrise.

The album reached number 6 in the ARIA Chart, staying in the chart for six weeks. As well as being available on CD, a limited number of copies were also released on vinyl.

== Track listing ==
All tracks are written by Jebediah.

No.	Title	Length
1.	"Lost My Nerve"	3:55
2.	"Oxygen"	2:52
3.	"She's Like a Comet"	3:43
4.	"To Your Door"	4:24
5.	"Control"	3:27
6.	"Under Your Bed"	2:13
7.	"Battlesong"	4:30
8.	"Freakin' Out"	4:01
9.	"The Lash"	3:13
10.	"High (Horse)"	3:55
11.	"Are We Ok?"	4:08

== Charts ==
Chart (2011)	Peak position
Australian Albums (ARIA)	6
