= Leaving Home (Jebediah song) =

Single by Jebediah

from the album Slightly Odway
- Released: 27 June 1997
- Recorded: April 1997
- Genre: Alternative rock
- Length: 2:59
- Label: Murmur
- Songwriters: Chris Daymond, Kevin Mitchell, Vanessa Thornton, Brett Mitchell
- Producer: Neill King

Jebediah singles chronology
"Jerks of Attention" (1996)	"Leaving Home" (1997)	"Military Strongmen" (1997)

"Leaving Home" is a song by Australian alternative rock band Jebediah, released in April 1997 as the lead single from their debut studio album, Slightly Odway. It was written by band members Chris Daymond, Kevin Mitchell, Vanessa Thornton and Brett Mitchell. It peaked at number 48 on the ARIA Singles Chart and reached number 10 in the Triple J Hottest 100 music poll for 1997.

== Background ==
In an interview with broadcaster Jane Gazzo, Kevin Mitchell explained that 'Leaving Home' was written during a rehearsal session in Melbourne when the band was about to record their "Jerks of Attention" single with producer Lyndsay Gravina. "Because we got bored, we started jamming other stuff. I had a chord progression and a little bit of a melody which was fresh in my mind and I just started playing it. I know we came up with an unashamedly Weezerish middle eight for the song. I wrote the lyrics in my bedroom in Perth."

== Reception ==
Australian musicologist Ian McFarlane described "Jerks of Attention" and "Leaving Home" as "two cracking singles". Double J named it in the top fifty Australian songs of the 1990s, saying, "When the drums come thumping in at the start and that gloriously thick guitar sound in the chorus… not to mention Kevin Mitchell's lazy Australian drawl. Leaving home never sounded so good"

Jonathan Lewis of AllMusic reviewed Slightly Odway, and he wrote: "Opening with the song that really launched their career, 'Leaving Home', the band sets the scene for what is to come. Loud guitars, cartoonishly simple lyrics, and a chorus that would send even the tamest of mosh-pits into a frenzy. And all of it topped by Kevin Mitchell's bizarre singing style – a mess of twisted vowels and the same sort of pronunciation that had James Reyne's fans reaching for their lyric sheets in confusion."

== Music video ==
The music video featured the band playing on the front lawn of a suburban home.

== Limited-edition vinyl release ==
It was later released as a limited-edition vinyl, with only 250 made for a Perth, Australia, release.

== Track listing ==
All tracks are written by Chris Daymond, Kevin Mitchell, Vanessa Thornton and Brett Mitchell

No.	Title	Length
1.	"Leaving Home"	2:59
2.	"Monument"	4:08
3.	"Thought About It (Live Demo)"	3:15

== Charts ==
Chart (1997)	Peak position
Australia (ARIA)	48
