= Goodnight, Bull Creek! =

Studio album by Bob Evans
- Released: 3 April 2009
- Recorded: July/August 2008; Alex the Great Studios, Nashville, Tennessee
- Genre: Folk pop
- Label: EMI
- Producer: Brad Jones

Bob Evans chronology
Suburban Songbook (2006)	Goodnight, Bull Creek! (2009)	Familiar Stranger (2013)

Singles from Goodnight, Bull Creek!
- 1. "Someone So Much" Released: 21 March 2009; 2. "Pasha Bulka (Where Did I Go Wrong?)" Released: 22 May 2009; 3. "Hand Me Downs" Released: 28 August 2009

Goodnight, Bull Creek! is the third studio album by Australian rock musician Kevin Mitchell, under his pseudonym Bob Evans. It was released through EMI on 3 April 2009. The album was recorded in Nashville, Tennessee, with producer Brad Jones (Sheryl Crow). The title of the album comes from the Perth suburb of Bull Creek where Mitchell lived between the ages of 5 and 18. Mitchell has said using it in the title of his album "was just something that gave me a cheap thrill ... to name it in a song ("Someone So Much"). Then I took it to the next step of it being the title of the record. It made sense."

The album debuted and peaked at number 22 on the ARIA Albums Chart.

== Background ==
Mitchell has said that the song "Brother, O Brother" was inspired, at least in part, by Australian Prime Minister Kevin Rudd's apology to the Stolen Generations in 2008. Mitchell has said he would converse with friends over the issue, "After one of those conversations the lyrics of the chorus came to me. It was influenced very much by what was going on with Sorry Day. As I wrote more, it took on a broader scope. It's about what's happening all over the world. The issue of reconciliation is rooted in poverty and disadvantage. It's a sad reflection on humanity."

Mitchell toured the album with a backing band that includes The Sleepy Jackson's drummer Malcolm Clark, and Hugh Jennings who was formerly in End of Fashion.

== Singles ==
The first single from the album, "Someone So Much", was released digitally as a multi-track single, including, "Power of Speech", on 21 February 2009 and as a physical single on 21 March 2009. The video for the song, directed by Reuben Field and produced by Dean Bates of Starchild Productions, was filmed in Kiama, Kangaroo Valley and Sydney. It features Mitchell together with an assortment of animated cut out animals.

The second single, "Pasha Bulker", is inspired by the 2007 grounding of the bulk carrier, MV Pasha Bulker, on Nobbys Beach in Newcastle but is fuelled by Mitchell's feelings of being lost at sea during a bout of depression in 2007.

I used it as a very vague metaphor for writing a song about feeling a bit lost at sea.

— Kevin Mitchell

The video for the song was released on 22 March 2009, and was directed and produced by Johnny Lopez and Richard Ellis of Candela Films. The single was released digitally on 22 May 2009. The song was used by the Nine Network for promotional adverts for the 2009 season of Sea Patrol.
The third single released was "Hand Me Downs" on 28 August 2009. The song is Mitchell's account of life as a working-class musician – his wife's a teacher, they rent, they buy second-hand clothes.

In the years I was writing this record in Perth there was this huge boom. It became very money orientated, everyone upwardly mobile. I started to feel pressure, 'Everyone is jumping on this gravy train and I'm not.' That's part of where the song is coming from. You don't have to board that train if you don't want to. I love this life so much. I haven't wanted to cave in to any pressure from society or my family that I should be achieving more in a material way. It takes a lot of work but it's my ideal existence. It's worth working hard for.

— Kevin Mitchell

== Reception ==
Professional ratings
Review scores
Source	Rating
The Dwarf	(mixed)
FasterLouder	(mixed)
Rave Magazine	(favorable)
The Vine	(mixed)

Triple J noted a heavier sound in their review, saying the third album has "more of a driving rock feel than his previous efforts". Mitchell himself said of the album; "This is my rock album. I’m saying goodbye to the suburbs."

== Track listing ==
1. "Someone So Much" – 3:34
2. "Pasha Bulker" – 3:15
3. "Hand Me Downs" – 3:32
4. "Your Love" – 3:21
5. "Wintersong" – 4:15
6. "We're a Mess" – 3:06
7. "Nuthin's Gonna Tear Me Away From You" – 3:15
8. "Power of Speech" – 3:47
9. "Brother, O Brother" – 4:01
10. "It's a Beginning" – 3:22
11. "Everything Goes" – 2:43

=== Goodnight, Bull Creek! Mornin' Richmond! ===
A special edition two disc release by EMI, with the second bonus disc containing live tracks recorded at the Corner Hotel in Richmond, a suburb in Melbourne.

1. "Someone So Much" – 3:42
2. "Hand Me Downs" – 3:29
3. "Friend" – 3:20
4. "Rocks in My Head" – 4:16
5. "Flame" – 3:21
6. "Nowhere Without You" – 4:46
7. "Sadness & Whiskey" / "Dock of the Bay" (Otis Redding cover) – 5:15
8. "Pasha Bulker (Where Did I Go Wrong?)" – 6:42
9. "Brother"

== Personnel ==
=== Musicians ===
- Kevin Mitchell – guitar (electric & acoustic), vocals, harmonica, piano, moog, claps
- Ken Coomer — drums, percussion
- Will Kimbrough — guitar (acoustic & electric), dobro guitar
- Brad Jones — bass, guitar (electric & acoustic), piano, keyboard, hammond organ, claps, vibes
- Chris Carmichael — violin, cello
- Jim Hoke – flute
- Melissa Mathers – vocals, vibes
- Hans Rotenberry — theremin

=== Credits ===
- Engineer, Mix Engineer & Producer – Brad Jones
  - Assistant Engineer – Jesse Newport; Aaron Sollman
- Photos – Andrew Christie
- Illustrations – Kareena Zerefos
