= Kevin Mitchell (musician) =

Australian musician (born 1977)

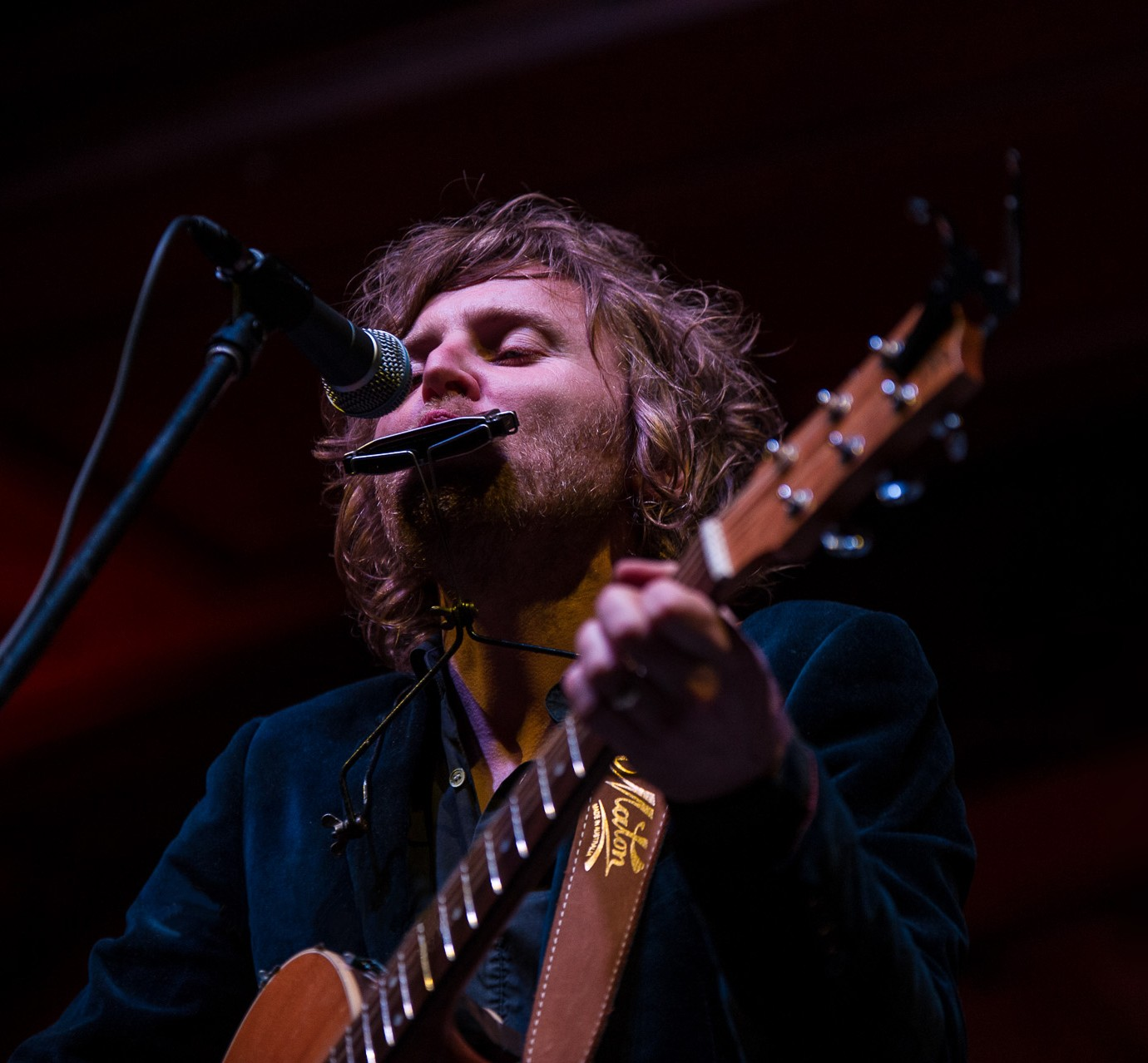
- Mitchell performing at The Abbey, Canberra, in September 2013

Background information
- Also known as: Bob Evans
- Born: Kevin Edward Mitchell; 1 October 1977 (age 49); Perth, Western Australia, Australian
- Genres: Alternative rock, folk pop
- Occupations: Musician, songwriter
- Instruments: Vocals, guitar, harmonica
- Years active: 1994–present
- Labels: Redline, EMI Australia
- Website: bobevans.com.au

Kevin Edward Mitchell (born 1 October 1977), known professionally as Bob Evans, is an Australian singer-songwriter; who primarily uses the pseudonym for his solo work. He is also the founding lead vocalist and rhythm guitarist of the Perth-based alternative rock band Jebediah, formed in 1994, which has included his older brother Brett Mitchell on drums since the band's inception. Jebediah released five studio albums between 1997 and 2011, the first three of which debuted in the top ten on the Australian Albums Chart.

In 1999, Mitchell began performing as a solo folk-pop artist under the stage name "Bob Evans", a pseudonym he deliberately chose to distinguish his solo work from Jebediah. The project served as an outlet for his quieter, more introspective songwriting, drawing form musical influences outside the band's primary sound. His most successful solo effort, Suburban Songbook (2006), peaked at No. 15 on the ARIA Albums Chart, while his subsequent releases, Goodnight, Bull Creek! (2009), and Familiar Stranger (2013), both reached the top 40.

He released Car Boot Sale in 2016 and Tomorrowland in 2021. As of October 2023, Mitchell has released seven solo studio albums. He launched the Good Evans, It's A Bobcast! podcast in May 2016.

== Biography ==
=== Early life ===
Mitchell was born on 1 October 1977. From the age of five to 18 years, he grew up in the outer Perth suburb of Bull Creek. His older brother, Brett, is a musician who played in various Perth-based groups, and both of his parents migrated from England. Mitchell's third studio album, Goodnight, Bull Creek! (3 April 2009) references his hometown, and Mitchell provided the following description at the time: "It's a very ordinary, plain little suburb with a primary school and a shopping centre and a BMX track."

Mitchell attended Bull Creek Primary School, where he played Australian rules football, and he also attended dance classes during his early adolescence. It was while he was engaged in theatre classes at Leeming Senior High School that he met Jebediah's lead guitarist Chris Daymond. Following Mitchell's successful completion of the Tertiary Entrance Examination (TEE), he commenced an undergraduate degree at a Western Australian university. After the first year he decided to forgo his course, and as a member of Jebediah, he signed a record deal in 1996.

In May 2009, Mitchell revealed that he experienced depression for a brief period at the age of 16 years. The condition then reappeared in 2007, and he explained:

I was feeling down with myself. The only time I had ever suffered depression was as a teenager when I was at school and here I was, 31 years old, and the last thing I ever thought was that those feelings would come back. I was confused and angry about it, thinking, "This is ridiculous, I'm an adult for Christ's sake", admonishing myself.

The experience eventually inspired the track "Pasha Bulker" on Goodnight Bull Creek. In a series of three blog posts published in March 2013 on the website of Australian music magazine The Music, Mitchell revealed that he had been "a 17 year-old university drop out that was still living with his parents rent free whilst discovering the joys of smoking bucket bongs", and described his "working class, English immigrant parents."

=== Jebediah formation and early years ===
In late 1994, Mitchell formed Jebediah with three school mates: Daymond on lead guitar, Almin Fulurija on drums, and Vanessa Thornton on bass guitar. Thornton had played lead guitar in her previous band Hybrid, but switched to bass guitar. Fulurija was soon replaced on drums by Brett before they played their first gig in May 1995 at Leeming Senior High School. Initially, the group performed cover versions by Pearl Jam, Green Day, Nirvana and the Smashing Pumpkins.

As Jebediah's popularity grew, they competed in the Australian National Campus Band Competition and, in October, they won the national final in Lismore, New South Wales. This success led to an opening slot on the 1996 Summersault music festival, which was run by the promoter Steve Pavlovic. Jebediah performed at the Fremantle Oval on 7 January alongside the Beastie Boys, Foo Fighters and Sonic Youth. In the setlist they appeared between the Amps and Pavement: Mitchell told Adam Connors of The West Australian that "[w]e've got an excellent position, I don't know how the hell we got it. I don't know what it's going to be like, I just don't know." He felt that "[j]umping up and down to Jebediah is the easiest thing ... Anyone can do it and you don't have to be a great dancer. That is how to deal with our music."

Jebediah signed with Murmur Records (a subsidiary label of Sony Music) in April 1996, "on the strength of their live shows alone. There were no demo recordings." The group won their first WAMi award in May that year for Best Stage Presence. In August they issued their first release, a five-track extended play, Twitch, which peaked at No. 61 on the ARIA Singles Chart. Mitchell and his three bandmates co-wrote their original material, with Mitchell supplying most of the lyrics. The band's first single, "Jerks of Attention", appeared in December, which earned a WAMi award, in mid-1997, for Most Popular Song and the group won the Most Popular Band category. Performances at Homebake and the Big Day Out, in addition to support shows for Soundgarden, Everclear, the Presidents of the United States of America, Silverchair and You Am I, further raised the band's profile.

On 8 September 1997 the band released their first studio album, Slightly Odway, which peaked at No. 7 on the ARIA Albums Chart and remained in the top 50 for 54 weeks. Slightly Odway was certified double platinum in 1998 by the Australian Recording Industry Association (ARIA). During tours in 1998, Mitchell "first started playing solo shows", according to Thornton. Jebediah's follow-up album, Of Someday Shambles, was recorded in 1999 and its first single "Animal" peaked at No. 16 on the ARIA Singles Chart, while the album reached No. 2. Of Someday Shambles eventually earned a platinum certification from ARIA.

Jebediah then released the single "Fall Down" in October 2001, ahead of their self-titled album, which appeared on 3 March 2002. "Fall Down" peaked at No. 24, while the album reached No. 8. Their fourth album, Braxton Hicks, followed on 12 July 2004 using the band's own label, Redline Records. Following Braxton Hicks, Jebediah embarked on a six-year hiatus, providing Mitchell with time to focus on his solo work. They resumed the band for the release of their fifth studio album, Kosciuszko, on 15 April 2011.

=== 2003–2009: Bob Evans' Suburban trilogy ===
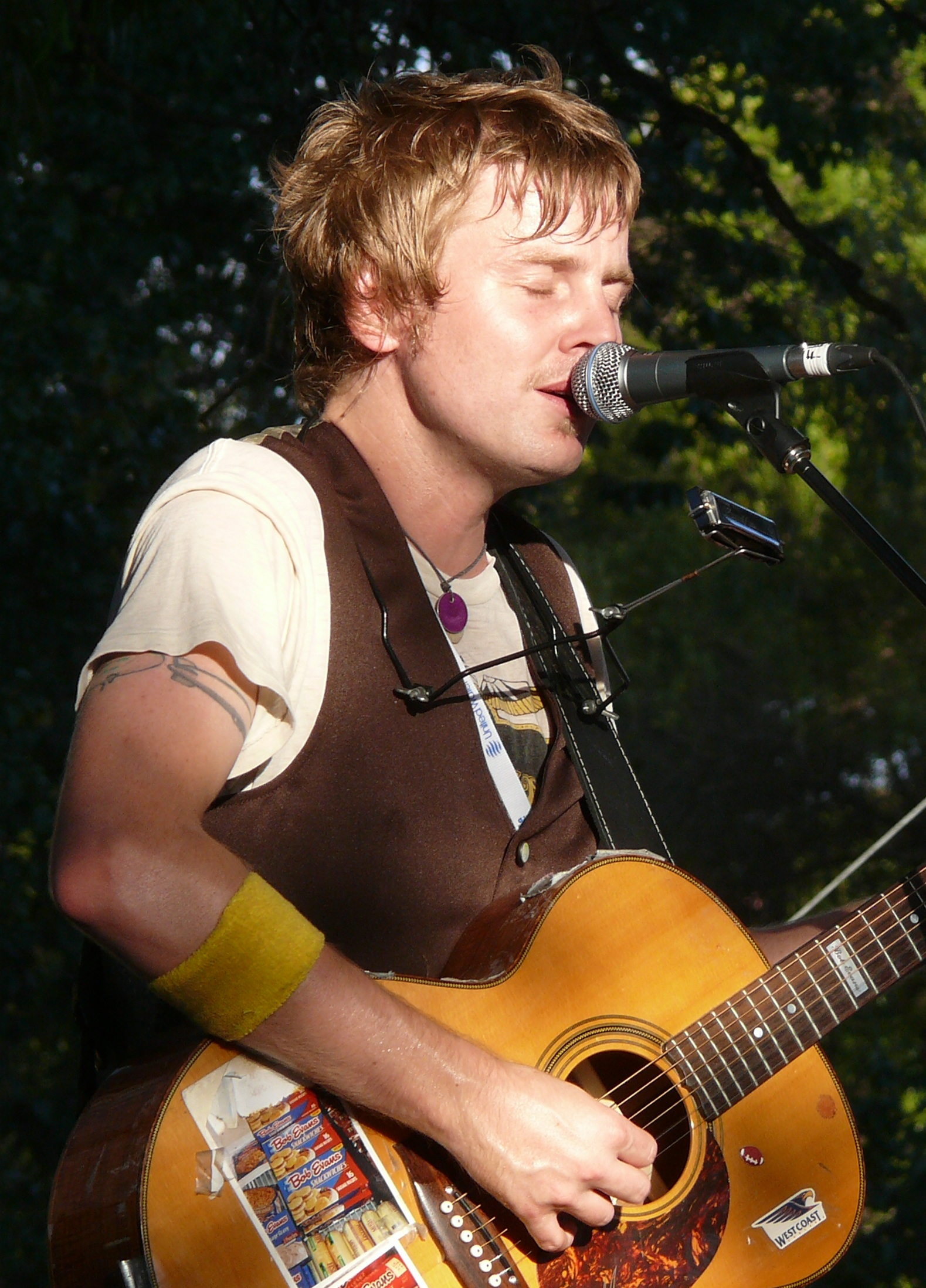
Kevin Mitchell performing as Bob Evans at WOMADelaide in Adelaide, March 2008

Since 1999 Mitchell performs and releases his solo work under the pseudonym of Bob Evans, which was chosen "because it was written on a T-shirt I was wearing". He created the name to play low-profile solo shows in Perth. In 2013, Mitchell elaborated, "It was just a way to be incognito, to separate myself from Jebediah. I had to create this kind of pseudonym so I could do things without people really knowing about it and having expectations about it." As Bob Evans, he concludes written communication with the sign offs: "XXXBOBXXX" or "XXXbobXXX".

Bob Evan's debut album, Suburban Kid, was released on 8 September 2003 by Redline Records, Evans co-produced it with Simon Struthers. AllMusic's Jason Ankeny compared the album to his material with Jebediah: it showed a "more intimate, roots-flavored dimension of his songwriting." It was described in a Yourgigs' review as "an album of youthful introspection, love and loss." The album was later acquired by EMI following Mitchell's transfer to that music company. Mitchell recorded Suburban Kid at a home studio owned by Struthers, who was the bass guitarist for Perth band Adam Said Galore. The song "The Hermit" was co-written by Mitchell with another Perth musician, Luke Steele (of the Sleepy Jackson and later a member of Empire of the Sun), while Steele's sister, Katy Steele (of Little Birdy), contributed backing vocals.

In August 2014, as part of Double J's Artist in Residence series, Mitchell revealed that the Streets' album A Grand Don't Come for Free (2004) was a major influence on his subsequent lyrical work, both for Jebediah and his solo project as Bob Evans. He felt that it was "one of the smartest albums ever made." Mitchell described the work of the Streets' lyricist, Mike Skinner, as "folk poetry".

The second Bob Evans studio album, Suburban Songbook, was released on 10 June 2006. Mitchell sent the demo version to record producers he was interested in and was surprised by a quick response from an American, Brad Jones (Josh Rouse, Yo La Tengo, Sheryl Crow): "Normally when you send a demo to a producer overseas you are lucky to even hear back. Within a month of him hearing the demos I was on a plane to Nashville to begin recording. The whole process seemed blessed." Jones embraced Mitchell's vision and suggested a more refined, listener-friendly approach. Suburban Songbook debuted at No. 15 on the ARIA Albums Charts. Its lead single, "Don't You Think It's Time?" (May 2006), was accompanied by a music video in which a mural is painted of Mitchell and his then-girlfriend (later his wife). The single was followed by an EP, Nowhere Without You (September 2006). At the ARIA Music Awards of 2006 Mitchell won his first ARIA Award: for Best Adult Contemporary Album for Suburban Songbook. He was also nominated for Best Male Artist. In 2010 Mitchell recalled: "Everything off Suburban Songbook is very special to me because it documents a watershed moment in my life, both personally and professionally, that will never happen again."

For his third Bob Evans album, Goodnight, Bull Creek!, Mitchell recorded in Nashville again, with Jones as producer. He hired singer-songwriter Melissa Mathers as a backing vocalist. According to Mitchell, the album is the final instalment in his suburban musical trilogy. "The title is referring to me saying farewells, as I said with the last record that I would only do one more suburban record as part of the trilogy. Ironically, this record isn't very suburban at all though; not nearly as much as the last one. But it is the end of the chapter."

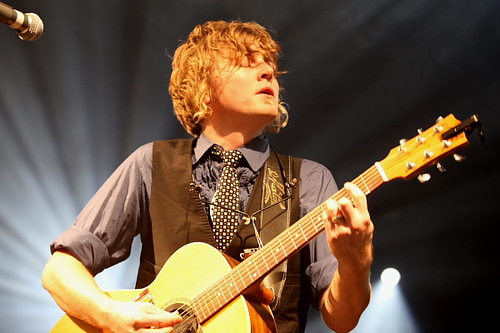
Bob Evans in July 2009; his third solo album, Goodnight, Bull Creek!, had been released in April, and peaked at No. 22 on the ARIA Albums Chart.

Goodnight, Bull Creek! was released on 3 April 2009 and debuted at No. 22. Natalie Salvo of TheDwarf.com.au website felt it was "a pretty patchy effort that at its worst gets dangerously close to Ben Lee's excruciating blend of twee pop ... I have issues with the fact that I've heard the bulk of the music in some way or shape before because many of the guitar flourishes seem to be borrowed from a batch of fifties/sixties easy-listening nostalgia classics." At the ARIA Awards that year it was nominated for Best Adult Contemporary Album and he was nominated for Best Male Artist.

=== 2009–2012: Basement Birds and Kosciuzko ===
During 2008 Bob Evans' backing band included Steve Parkin as a guitarist and backing vocalist (ex-Vinyl, Autopilot, solo). By mid-2009 the pair were writing songs together and were corresponding with Kavyen Temperley (of Eskimo Joe) and solo singer-songwriter Josh Pyke. All four wanted to form a side project, Basement Birds, to showcase new material. Their debut single, "Waiting for You", was released in April 2010: it is co-written by Mitchell, Parkin, Pyke and Temperley. The group's self-titled album appeared in July and peaked at No. 12.

Basement Birds supported the album with a national tour, which was followed by members returning to their main projects; they performed a number of "final shows" including a gig in Perth on 7 April 2011. Perth Now's Jay Hanna caught that show, where they played "country tinged acoustic pop without pomp and fanfare, but with plenty of humour and heart." Mitchell reflected on the side project's disbandment: "we keep saying this is the last gig then we do another one. It just seems fitting to do the last one in Perth given we are mainly a Perth band. I guess to be perfectly honest with you there is every possibility that if a gig too good to refuse came up again this year there is every chance that we would get the band back together. But there are no plans to."

Mitchell had resumed working with Jebediah in 2010 to record their fifth studio album, Kosciuzko (April 2011), and the corresponding tour dates. Mitchell recounted in 2013 about putting his Bob Evans persona aside:

I needed a break, I felt like I'd reached the end of the road a bit, with what I was doing with Bob. I felt like I'd gone as far as I could or wanted to go with that style of music that I was making… it had been pretty much a ten-year, three-album road that I'd walked down, I definitely felt like I needed a break so that I could refresh and do something new.

Mitchell performed at the Pyramid Rock Festival over the 2010–11 new year holiday season both as a member of Basement Birds and of Jebediah. Jebediah toured domestically during 2011, including further festival appearances at Splendour in the Grass and the Coaster Festival, and a tour with Violent Soho. During that year, Mitchell was asked to list his favourite 10 songs of the year: he included "Bronte" by Gotye, "Perfection" by Adalita, "Broken Songs" by Jim Ward and "Design Desire" by Abbe May in his selection.

Jebediah played fewer live shows in 2012 than in the previous year, but included an appearance at the inaugural Breath of Life festival in Tasmania and a hometown show with Eskimo Joe at the Perth Concert Hall. Mitchell participated in a series of mid-2012 events that were organised by 3RRR, a community radio station based in Melbourne. The series, "The Story So Far … ", featured musicians including Mitchell and Tim Rogers (You Am I), who relayed personal experiences from their music careers. Mitchell performed acoustic versions of "Don't You Think It's Time" and "Someone So Much". In a review of the event, the online journalist Natalie Salvo wrote:

Mitchell proved to be a great interviewee. He was open, candid and animated. Showing he's a real romantic at heart, he offered tender responses (like wishing he'd had the opportunity to have a beer with his late father) plus light and funny anecdotes too. The latter included talk about learning jazz ballet as a child (complete with an impromptu demonstration) and meeting Lily Allen at the Sydney Big Day Out.

=== 2012–2013: Familiar Stranger ===
By mid-2012, following touring in support of Jebediah's Kosciuzko, Mitchell had commenced work for his fourth Bob Evans album, Familiar Stranger (15 March 2013). Mitchell wrote about 40 tracks to select from for the album, he told Kathy McCabe of the Herald Sun newspaper: "This time, for the first time, I put the songs in order before we started recording and kept that order in mind because I wanted to make a soundtrack to the movie in my brain." In August 2012 Mitchell entered the recording studio for that album.

On 15 October 2012, Mitchell appeared on national radio station, Triple J, on Breakfast with Tom and Alex, to showcase "Don't Wanna Grow Up Anymore". He revealed that Joey Waronker (of Atoms for Peace, Beck's backing band) had played drums on the album. Evans' website announced a national tour and the release date of a four-track EP, The Double Life (9 November 2012). Dean Reid (Marina and the Diamonds, Mystery Jets) produced both the EP and the album (which was recorded at Sing Sing Studios in Richmond, where Jebediah had made their first two albums), Reid also contributed guitar, keyboards and programming. Mitchell explained during an "Unplugged and Wired" performance for Google+ on 28 November that The Double Life title applied to his concurrent work with Jebediah, as well as his role as father and husband; which was later confirmed in the interview with McCabe.

A music video for "Don't Wanna Grow Up Anymore", the album's lead single, was released on 26 October and premiered on the Channel V programme WTF. It was directed by Darcy Prendergast for his Melbourne-based company, Oh Yeah Wow. Mitchell explained that the video was inspired by one made for the Smashing Pumpkins song "1979".

For Mitchell, Familiar Stranger is a progression beyond what can be heard in his previous work: "I don't sit and listen to alt-country and folk music all day anymore… if I had made another record with the same sort of musical pallet as the last two I would have been forcing it." Mitchell further explained that Goldfrapp, Santigold, Wilco and Spoon were some of his musical interests during the creation of the fourth album. Triple J announcer, Richard Kingsmill, previewed Familiar Stranger on 3 February 2013.

"Go" was the second single and features backing vocals from Scarlett Stevens of the Perth indie band, San Cisco. The music video for "Go" was published on the BobEvansMusic YouTube channel on 7 February 2013. The "Go" music video contains a cameo appearance by Tim Rogers, who portrays the "cool" nemesis of Mitchell's goofy and unlucky character.

Following the "Go" music video, Mitchell released a video parody, entitled "Bob Evans' Big Pre-album interview", to promote Familiar Stranger. He explained in a radio interview on 18 February 2013 that, while the previous two albums are "Nashville-sounding", for Familiar Stranger he sought to "make a record that sounded like an awesome version of my garage." Mitchell also announced the participation of guest singer Dune (pseudonym for Jade McRae), In terms of inspiration, Mitchell cryptically stated that the album was about his "recent run ins with the universe, taking away and giving back."

In March 2013, Mitchell stated, during an ABC Radio National interview, that his fellow Jebediah members "kind of put up with him [Bob Evans]; they tolerate him. Ahh ... You know, I think they understand why he's around, and why he needs to do what he does ... but sometimes i think they look at him with a sort of sense of bemusement." In relation to their extraneous musical activities, Mitchell explained that "they 'moonlight' in other local Perth outfits." As Bob Evans, he participated in the Townsville and Adelaide heats of the Telstra Road to Discovery competition which encouraged "unsigned musical talent" from within Australia to enter. Mitchell played on 8 August and 17 August 2013 at the University of Adelaide and the Townsville Cultural Festival, respectively.

=== 2014–present: Jebediah shows and Car Boot Sale ===
Jebediah played a Western Australian new year's show at the Dunsborough Tavern, Dunsborough, at the completion of 2013. Then they completed an Australian regional tour starting in Victoria and New South Wales in January 2014, which culminated in a large winery show in Albany, where they played alongside You Am I and the Hoodoo Gurus. They then supported the Hoodoo Gurus again at the band's November 2014 reunion show, "Be My Guru," in Perth, alongside Ratcat and British India. Mitchell confirmed through social media on 29 October 2014 that he is writing material for his fifth solo album. Mitchell's list of favourite albums of 2014 included those by Ryan Adams, Spoon, Beck and Tweedy.

Bob Evans was one of the performers at Geelong's Festival of Sails in January 2015. Jebediah were announced in early February 2015 as one of the band's on the bill of Australia's Big Pineapple Music Festival, alongside Violent Soho and Thundamentals, which was held on 30 May 2015 on the Sunshine Coast.

The sixth Bob Evans studio album Car Boot Sale was released through the EMI label on 17 June 2016. Mitchell released the two-part music video "Matterfact/Happy Tears" on YouTube on 24 May 2016 as an introduction to the album.

The seventh Bob Evans studio album Tomorrowland was released in 2021.

== Touring ==
During 2007, as Bob Evans, Mitchell supported Evermore on the band's Welcome to the Real Life Tour of Australia and New Zealand. He followed with festival performances: the 2007 Big Day Out tour, Homebake, the West Coast Blues & Roots Festival and The Great Escape festival. Mitchell also played showcases in New York City and Johannesburg, before undertaking an Australian tour with Machine Translations and South African solo artist, Farryl Purkiss.

In April 2009 Mitchell commenced a national tour to promote the release of Goodnight, Bull Creek! and was joined by Malcolm Clark (Sleepy Jackson), Hugh Jennings (End of Fashion), Ben Witt (The Chemist) and Louis Macklin (67 Special), while America's Steve Poltz (The Rugburns) was the support act. Mitchell also returned to Europe and played shows in London, UK and Sweden, with the latter show in support of Melbourne, Australia band Architecture in Helsinki. In July 2009, Mitchell played the Splendour in the Grass festival in Byron Bay and, together with his backing band from 2009, he was then the support act for Eskimo Joe on the Inshalla national tour.

During December 2011, prior to Christmas, Mitchell embarked on a tour of the east coast of Australia with fellow Australian musician, Adalita Srsen. The pair had previously toured together as members of their respective bands, Jebediah and Magic Dirt. The Good Evans it's Xmas Tour had the pair performing a rendition of "Must Be Santa", which had also been covered by Bob Dylan in 2009. In October 2012, following the release of "Don't Wanna Grow Up Anymore" from Familiar Stranger, a national tour was announced. The main support act was Thelma Plum, a folk musician from Queensland (Plum was a participant in the 'Unearthed' project that is organised by Triple J).

On 14 December 2012, Mitchell announced that he would be performing at the 2013 Tamworth Country Music Festival – that appearance was his third consecutive one at the festival as Bob Evans. He proclaimed "I fricken love going to Tamworth and urge anyone within road trip distance to come along for the weekend." In previous years Mitchell played with a backing band which included Ashley Naylor (Even) and Roderick "Wally Meanie" Kempton (The Meanies). At the 2011 festival, Mitchell performed a duet with Australian country music artist Kirsty Lee Akers who had discovered Mitchell during his supporting tour with Australian country music artist Keith Urban – Akers explained on stage that, prior to the Urban tour, she had often heard a Bob Evans song at a shopping centre without knowing the name of the artist. The pair performed a rendition of John Prine's song, "In Spite of Ourselves".

The first national Familiar Stranger Tour commenced on the Sunshine Coast on 11 April 2013 and finished in rural Victoria on 18 May in Meeniyan. Mitchell was supported by a band, Tigertown, which were winners of an Unearthed competition; and by Davey Lane, from You Am I. A second, more extensive national tour, started in April 2013, following the release of the album. Mitchell's backing band comprised Malcolm Clarke, Davey Lane, James Fleming and Tony Buchen (Buchen also assisted with the album's mixing and is a friend of Waronker); Tigertown returned as a supporting band for this tour.

As part of an interview on Radio National, Mitchell explained:

I still love touring ... I've been doing it constantly for over 15 years now, so it's become one of those things that's familiar to me now, for better or for worse, it's what's normal ... So I do still enjoy it [touring] and I miss it when I'm not doing it.

In mid-July 2013 Mitchell revealed plans for a 16-date capital city tour: "I will literally be getting in the car and driving from town to town on my lonesome in good old fashion road trip style which is something I've never really done before, (I pretty much just want to be Jeff Bridges in Crazy Heart for a few weeks)." Mitchell donated A$214.75 to the Australian Red Cross following the tour, using donations that he collected at the merchandise desk throughout the tour.

In 2023, Mitchell undertook the 'When Kev Met Bob' Anthology Tour, featuring work from the Bob Evans and Jebediah years.

== Cover versions ==
Mitchell has recorded numerous cover versions, both in his work with Jebediah and as Bob Evans. Jebediah recorded a version of Midnight Oil's "When the Generals Talk" (October 1984) for the tribute album, The Power & The Passion (2001); a rendition of Something For Kate's "Clint", for the Harpoon EP (June 1998) (Something For Kate also recorded a cover version of "Harpoon" for that EP); a version of Flock of Seagulls' "I Ran", also for the Harpoon EP; and a rendition of "Pace It", a song by Magic Dirt appears on Gleesides and Sparities, a compilation album (October 2003).

On 2 December 2006, as a follow-up to his Suburban Songbook album, Mitchell released a five-track EP of cover versions, Stolen Songbook, that solely featured the work of fellow Perth artists, which was only available in a digital download format. Mitchell recorded renditions of Little Birdy's "Beautiful to Me", The Triffids' "Wide Open Road", The Sleepy Jackson's "Come to This", Eskimo Joe's "Liar" and Red Jezebel's "See Through Dress". The cover image with the download was a photo of Mitchell, similar to ones used in its accompanying booklet. Writing for the FasterLouder website, Lilbirdy stated that the EP's results are "by and large pleasing" and it "is a superb retrospective of West Australian music".

In June 2007 a Go-Betweens tribute album, Write Your Adventures Down, featured a Bob Evans rendition of "Streets of Your Town" (July 1998) Mitchell subsequently performed the song as part of a tribute concert which was recorded by the TV department of Triple J. He performed at a Bob Dylan tribute concert in 2012, where he co-performed "Tambourine Man" and "If Not for You", At a Paul Kelly tribute event, in November 2009, he delivered solo versions of "From St Kilda to Kings Cross" and "Love Never Runs on Time". The event was recorded for Before Too Long: Triple J's Tribute to Paul Kelly (February 2010) in both CD and DVD formats.

Under the Bob Evans moniker, Mitchell has performed for Triple J segment "Like a Version" on several occasions: his Little Birdy cover, from the Stolen Songbook EP, was one of the contributions; Lily Allen's "Not Fair" was performed in 2011 (the rendition was also performed in subsequent live shows); and, on 1 March 2013, for the 'O Week' event run by Australia's universities, Mitchell played a cover version of Santigold's "Disparate Youth".

During Bob Evans tours, Mitchell has performed renditions of the Hal David and Burt Bacharach song "Raindrops Keep Fallin' on My Head", He has also attached excerpts from Eric Clapton's song "Tears in Heaven" and Otis Redding's "Dock of the Bay" onto the end of his own songs. Mitchell performed a live version of The Beatles song, "Two of Us", with Josh Pyke during a tour, and paid another tribute to The Beatles with a live rendition of "Taxman" at the Splendour in the Grass festival in 2009.

In solo mode, Mitchell has also performed numerous cover versions as a part of his appearances on the Special Broadcasting Service (SBS) programme, RocKwiz – the performances feature the support of the show's house band. In 2011 a video was published at YouTube which featured Mitchell and Katy Steele's duet of The Louvin Brothers' "You're Learning".

== Collaborations ==
For his debut Bob Evans record, Mitchell co-wrote "The Hermit" with Luke Steele, while Steele's sister Katy Steele performed backing vocals on the song "Ode to My Car". In 2008 Mitchell performed with Simon Day, formerly of the Australian band Ratcat, at the Oxford Art Factory venue in Sydney, Australia and later revealed in an interview that the first recording that he ever purchased was Ratcat's Tingles EP.

Mitchell was one of the "Friends" who appeared on an edition of Triple J's "Live at the Wireless" segment, in which You Am I collaborated with other artists including Adalita, Tex Perkins and Bernard Fanning – Mitchell provided vocals on the songs, "Berlin Chair" and "If We Can't Get It Together".

Mitchell worked with Melissa Mathers on Suburban Songbook – Mathers performed backing vocals on the songs, "Hand Me Downs" and "Wintersong". Mitchell was asked by Australian country musician Kirsty Lee Akers to perform a duet of the John Prine song, "In Spite of Ourselves", at the 2010 Tamworth Country Music Festival, and a music video was provided.

=== Bob Dylan tribute ===
Alongside fellow Australian musicians Temperley, Pyke, Holly Throsby and Patience Hodgson, Mitchell performed a series of tribute shows in commemoration of Bob Dylan's 50th anniversary as a songwriter. The "one-off" group performed shows in Melbourne, Sydney, Brisbane and at the Splendour in the Grass festival.

=== Basement Birds ===
Following his commitments for Goodnight Bull Creek, Mitchell embarked on a recording and touring project with the Basement Birds—a side project with Temperley, Pyke and Steve Parkin. The four musicians recorded and released a self-funded album and completed a national tour in support of the album. The process that was undertaken by the group of friends was unique for the Australian music industry, as explained on the Australian independent music website Soulshine: "In an Australian first, their music will be unveiled in four 3 track bundles fortnightly on iTunes from late June 2010. As well as this, there will be acoustic versions of each track released every alternate fortnight and exclusive content available for fans via the new website ...". The album features the backing vocals of Julia Stone, from Angus & Julia Stone, on a song, "Bus Stop", which was written by Pyke and Mitchell.

=== Internet-based collaborations ===
Mitchell performed Bob Evans songs for a MySpace event that was held in Melbourne, Australia in 2008; Mitchell was joined on stage by drummer Clarke.

Following his signing with booking agent, Select Music, Mitchell also signed with Internet music venture Spotify in mid-2012. As part of his collaboration with Spotify, he posted articles, including 'The Music I Love', on the company's website and Spotify were one of the sponsors on the 'Double Life' tour.

On 29 November 2012, Mitchell performed for a Google+ event, "Hangout on Air". Following his performance, Mitchell answered live questions from people who had logged into their Google accounts to view the event; the event was also uploaded to YouTube, thereby allowing access to people who were unable to view the performance live.

Mitchell's song, "Don't You Think It's Time", from the Suburban Songbook album, was selected for a new Telstra initiative in June 2014 that was primarily conducted on the Internet. The collaboration was a competition in which Australian musicians, who were not signed to a music company at the time of submission, were invited to submit their version of the song to see if the composition can reach the "number one" position on the Australian singles chart; hence, the title "2nd Chance Song". EMI, the music company that Mitchell remains signed with, was responsible for recording and distributing the winning entry. Four other Australian artists – Sheppard, Megan Washington, Luke and Katy Steele, and Illy – recorded versions of the song for the competition, which can all be seen on YouTube. When the song was originally released, it reached the 22nd position on the Australian singles chart and was responsible for launching Mitchell's solo career.

== Media appearances ==
Mitchell has appeared on the Australian television programs The Glasshouse, The Merrick & Rosso Show, Spicks and Specks and RocKwiz. Mitchell has also undertaken live performances on RockWiz and a solo performance of "Hand Me Downs" appears in an episode that was published onto YouTube in March 2011.

In March 2010, Mitchell was a guest presenter on triple j as a substitute for Morning Show's host Zan Rowe, who was attending the South by Southwest (SXSW) Music Conference. Mitchell was selected as a musician-presenter for triple j's Dig Music initiative, launched in late 2013 – his first broadcast was aired on 5 November 2013 and included his top five live music experiences.

Mitchell wrote a three-part series of articles for TheMusic.com.au website in March 2013 as "The Life & Times of Bob Evans". They are whimsical reflections by Mitchell, who shares insights into life from the perspective of a musician. Also that month Mitchell appeared, with a backing band, to perform the Bob Evans song, "Go", on TV programme, Weekend Sunrise, on the Seven Network.

Alongside Srsen, Mitchell was selected by Australia's Double J radio station for the August 2014 "Artist in Residence" role. Mitchell and Srsen presented two Sunday episodes individually throughout August, and then co-presented the final episode, "Unforgettable Opening Lines", on 31 August. The "Artist in Residence" episodes aired on Sundays and Mitchell's individual episodes are titled "Love & Lust" and "The End".

== National Office for Live Music ==
Kevin Rudd, Australian Prime Minister, announce in early July 2013 the formation of the National Office for Live Music on the day after attending a fund raiser for the SLAM (Save Live Australia's Music) campaign. Rudd explained that "ambassadors" would represent live music in their respective states, with Mitchell appointed as the Victorian representative. Mitchell stated, as part of the announcement: "When I first started playing music with Jebediah in Perth in 1995 we never talked about making records, we just dreamed of playing gigs at all our favourite venues that we'd gone to see our favourite bands play in before us."

Mitchell further explained the initiative in an October 2013 radio interview, in which he stated that his duties in the role will be "pretty basic":

It will do a number of things, but one of the things it will do is help small venues with all these ridiculous laws and things that they've been struggling with for years, and why so many venues have been closing down ... This just kind of pulls everything into focus, I think—it will tackle things nationally and, I think, will protect the arts and live performance community in Australia

== Artistry ==
=== Songwriting ===
In an interview with the AU review website, published on 7 March 2013, Mitchell provided insight into his songwriting:

It's important to not underestimate your listeners, the worst thing a band or musician can do is to think that their audience is less capable off themselves, because than you always write to the lowest common denominator and that is how you write shit music. But if you consider your audience to be highly intelligent, and highly capable of taking to musical journeys, than you're always trying to write something above yourself and reach further. I think that's really important. Expect the unexpected.

In terms of the recording process, Mitchell said in March 2013: "The recording side of things, I've grown to love. When I first started making records, I ... had no idea what I was doing, basically, and it's something that I've had to learn ... I think I'm only just starting to get good at it, after, you know, many, many attempts."

=== Identity ===
Mitchell has explained his pseudonym: "I think Bob Evans is more me than Kevin Mitchell from Jebediah is! In that way it's like a reverse alter-ego. It just allows me to push things a bit. Bob's been enough under the radar to give me, creatively, a lot more freedom than I might otherwise have." When asked later for the meaning of the term "reverse alter-ego", he said: "I've no idea, that's one of those quotes that I've been haunted by."

Mitchell's original intention for the Bob Evans persona was to record a trilogy of suburban-themed solo albums and, following the completion of that objective, he admitted that an era of his life had ended:

I'll run Bob into the ground on this record and do as much work as I can, and do as many tours and as many festivals as I can into next year. Then I'm going to give him a break and do another Jebediah record and do some collaborative stuff with other people. Then after doing a few different things, I'll come back and see what I do next. I do like the idea of it just being a three album journey. I don't have any sort of fear of just starting all over again under a different name, or in a different... whatever.

=== Influences ===
In a radio interview with Julian Morrow on Australia's Radio National station, Mitchell revealed his admiration for Yoko Ono. As the show was broadcast on 8 March 2013, International Women's Day, Morrow asked Mitchell about a favoured female musician and Ono was presented as a selection that came to mind at the time of the interview. Mitchell stated that he respected the manner in which Ono has maintained John Lennon's legacy and referred to her "credibility".

== Accolades and awards ==
Suburban Songbook won the 2006 ARIA Music Award for Best Adult Contemporary Album and Mitchell/Evans received a nomination for Best Male Artist. The album was also nominated for the 2006 Australian Music Prize and the 2006 J Award.

At the 2007 WAMi awards, Mitchell was nominated for two awards—'Most Popular Album' and 'Best Commercial Pop Act'—while participants in the 2007 Rolling Stone annual readers poll selected Mitchell as 'Best Male Artist'. "Pasha Bulker", the second song that was released from Goodnight Bull Creek, won in the 'Best Pop/Top 40 Artist' category in the 2007 International Songwriting Award competition (the judging panel consisted of artists such as Brian Wilson (The Beach Boys), Frank Black (Pixies), Robert Smith (The Cure) and Tom Waits)—other winners for that year were The Living End and Sarah Blasko.

Together with Akers, Mitchell won the 'Best Video Clip' award at the 2010 Australian Country Music People's Choice Awards—the video featured puppet representations of the two musicians that were in the style of The Muppets.

In mid-August 2013, Mitchell was a 'First Longlist' finalist for the 9th Coopers AMP, alongside artists such as Nick Cave and the Bad Seeds and The Drones. The Australian music prize, worth A$30,000, went to Big Scary, for their album Not Art. Familiar Stranger received an ARIA Award nomination in the Best Adult Contemporary category on 15 October 2013.

== Personal life ==
Mitchell's father was diagnosed with bowel cancer in 1995 and died by February 1998, which was a shorter time frame than what was outlined in the prognosis. Mitchell and his bandmate brother, Brett, co-wrote the lyrics for Jebediah's single, "Feet Touch the Ground" (November 1999), which conveys Mitchell's sense of feeling "let down" by the early death of his father.

Mitchell married long-term girlfriend, Kristen in November 2006 and in December 2008 they moved from Perth to Melbourne, later living in the western Melbourne suburb of Deer Park. In 2014, Mitchell and his family left Melbourne to relocate to Ocean Grove on the Victorian Bellarine Peninsula. Mitchell explained the coastal relocation on social media in late May 2014: "I've left the Melbourne suburbs and moved to the coast so I can re enact all my favourite scenes from the ABC [television] show SeaChange and write an album full of earnest beach funk tunes", a tongue-in-cheek quote that was taken seriously by some future interviewers.

Mitchell and his wife are the parents of two children, Ella who was born in 2011 and Ivy who was born in 2013. Speaking on his personal life in 2013, prior to the release of Familiar Stranger, Mitchell jokingly revealed that "I have zero social life. I have no hobbies, I have nothing else except making music and being a father".

During an appearance on the TV programme, The Merrick & Rosso Show, Mitchell was surprised by the topic of the 'Cosby Dance' due its personal nature. He eventually performed the dance for the audience, but reiterated in a subsequent interview that he could not believe that the topic had moved beyond his inner friendship circle. Following an "Unplugged and Wired" performance for Google+ on 28 November 2012, Mitchell revealed that his ideal dinner guests would be Ricky Gervais, for laughter; Barack Obama, for intellectual discussion; and his wife, so that he could share the moment with a loved one. Mitchell has admitted to cutting his own hair but is unsure why he does this.

In a March 2013 radio interview, Mitchell explained that, although his wife joined him during the Bob Evans touring process for a while, his family does not typically accompany him on tours. He expounded: "If I was more popular and I toured with a certain level of comfort, then it might be an option."

== Discography ==
All releases are under the pseudonym, Bob Evans, for work with his bands see Jebediah discography and Basement Birds discography.

Bob Evans discography
- Studio albums: 4
- Extended plays: 3
- Compilation albums: 1
- Singles: 10

=== Studio albums ===
Album details	Peak chart positions	Certifications
Album details	AUS	Certifications
Suburban Kid: Released: 8 September 2003; Label: Redline RED020; Format: CD	—	
Suburban Songbook: Released: 10 June 2006; Label: Capitol 3612892; Format: CD, digital download	15	ARIA: Gold
Goodnight, Bull Creek!: Released: 3 April 2009; Label: EMI Music Australia 2682202; Format: CD, digital download	22	
Familiar Stranger: Released: 15 March 2013; Label: EMI Music Australia; Format: CD, digital download, vinyl	31	
Car Boot Sale: Released: 17 June 2016; Label: EMI Music Australia; Format: CD, digital download, vinyl	46	
Tomorrowland: Released: 16 April 2021; Label; Format: CD, digital download, vinyl	—	
"—" denotes releases that did not chart.

==== Compilation albums ====
Title	Album details	Peak chart positions
Title	Album details	AUS
Full Circle	Released: 5 October 2018; Label: EMI Music Australia; Format: CD, digital, vinyl	—
"—" denotes a recording that did not chart or was not released in that territory.

=== Extended plays ===
EP details	Peak chart positions
EP details	AUS
Nowhere Without You EP: Released: 2 September 2006; Label: EMI Music Australia Pty Limited; Format: Digital download	—
Stolen Songbook EP: Released: 2 December 2006; Label: EMI Music Australia Pty Limited; Format: Digital download	—
The Double Life EP: Released: 9 November 2012; Label: EMI Music Australia Pty Limited5099972160428; Format: CD, digital download	—
"—" denotes releases that did not chart.

=== Singles ===
Year	Song	Peak chart positions	Album
Year	Song	AUS	Album
2003	"Friday Come Five"	—	Suburban Kid
2003	"Turn"	—	Suburban Kid
2006	"Don't You Think It's Time?"	22	Suburban Songbook
2006	"Nowhere Without You"	84	Suburban Songbook
2007	"Friend"	—	Suburban Songbook
2007	"Sadness and Whiskey"	—	Suburban Songbook
2009	"Someone So Much"	—	Goodnight, Bull Creek!
2009	"Pasha Bulker"	—	Goodnight, Bull Creek!
2009	"Hand Me Downs"	—	Goodnight, Bull Creek!
2012	"Don't Wanna Grow Up Anymore"	—	Familiar Stranger
2013	"Go"	—	Familiar Stranger
2021	"Born Yesterday"		Tomorrowland
2021	"Concrete Heart"		Tomorrowland
"—" denotes releases that did not chart.
