= Slightly Odway =

Studio album by Jebediah
- Released: 8 September 1997
- Recorded: March–May 1997
- Genre: Alternative rock
- Length: 54:00
- Label: Murmur
- Producer: Neill King

Jebediah chronology
Twitch (1997)	Slightly Odway (1997)	Of Someday Shambles (1999)

Singles from Slightly Odway
- 1. "Leaving Home" Released: 27 June 1997; 2. "Military Strongmen" Released: 11 October 1997; 3. "Teflon" Released: 23 March 1998; 4. "Harpoon" Released: 22 June 1998

Slightly Odway is the debut studio album by Australian alternative rock band Jebediah. It was recorded between March and May 1997 at Sing Sing Studios in Melbourne, with Neill King producing. Slightly Odway was released on 8 September 1997 by record label Murmur.

It peaked at number 7 on the ARIA Albums Chart, and appeared in the top 50 for non-consecutive runs totalling 54 weeks.

== Recording ==
The group's line-up of Chris Daymond on lead guitar, Kevin Mitchell on lead vocals and rhythm guitar, Vanessa Thornton on bass guitar and Kevin's older brother, Brett Mitchell, on drums started recording Slightly Odway in March 1997 with United Kingdom's Neill King (The Smiths, Madness, Elvis Costello) producing.

== Content ==
According to Australian music journalist Ed Nimmervoll, the title "is a comment on the slightly odd way they feel they approach life as well as music".

In March 2002 Kevin reflected on his song writing "It didn't bother me that people didn't pick up on the lyrics. I'd made a conscious effort to focus on lyrics, because there were some lyrics on Slightly Odway that I was a little embarrassed about, ones where I hadn't really been trying. But I certainly didn't want vindication or attention for what I'd written."

=== Album cover ===
The bowling green on the artwork of the album is the Kardinya Bowling Club, where bass player Vanessa Thornton's grandparents played. The spaceship is in fact a Futuro house that was located on the corner of Leach Highway and Karel Avenue in Willetton, close to where the band members grew up. The structure was used as part of a sales office for a nearby residential subdivision and was removed in 1996, after being donated to the Barking Gecko Theatre Company.

=== Critical reception ===
Professional ratings
Review scores
Source	Rating
AllMusic	3.5/5 stars

In his retrospective review, Jonathan Lewis of AllMusic wrote that Slightly Odway "shows Jebediah as a talented young band, despite the flimsy songwriting and the lack of light and shade on the album. Once Jebediah learn they don't need to bludgeon the audience with their guitar-playing they will be better off for it." Lewis preferred the earlier version of "Jerks of Attention", which is "one of their finest songs", over the album version, which was "a half-paced version of the original single: it certainly doesn't improve it."

In May 2011 Matt Neal of The Warrnambool Standard felt the album was "packed with big power chords, frontman Kevin "Bob Evans" Mitchell's distinctive sing-through-your-nose approach, inspired bursts of guitar noise and a love of crowd-friendly melodies. Some of it hasn't aged well".

== Recognition ==
In 2011, the album placed at number 15 in a list of the greatest 100 Australian albums compiled by Australian youth radio station Triple J.

== Track listing ==
All tracks are written by Jebediah (Chris Daymond, Brett Mitchell, Kevin Mitchell and Vanessa Thornton), except as noted

No.	Title	Length
1.	"Leaving Home"	3:01
2.	"Benedict"	4:03
3.	"Harpoon"	4:28
4.	"Jerks of Attention"	4:46
5.	"Invaders" (Jebediah, Reg Presley)	3:40
6.	"Spoil the Show"	4:03
7.	"Blame"	1:56
8.	"Puckdefender"	4:57
9.	"Lino"	4:06
10.	"Military Strongmen"	3:27
11.	"Teflon"	3:46
12.	"Twilight = Dusk"	4:45
13.	"La Di Da Da"	7:47

Japanese version bonus tracks
No.	Title	Length
14.	"Monument"	4:08
15.	"Tracksuit"	4:25

== Personnel ==
Jebediah

- Kevin Mitchell – guitar, keyboards, vocals
- Chris Daymond – guitar, percussion, vocals
- Brett Mitchell – drums, percussion, vocals
- Vanessa Thornton – bass

Additional musicians

- DJ Rub-A-Dub – vocals on "Teflon"
- Helen Mountford – cello
- Michelle, Kim, Mindy, Tom, Heath, Brendon, Steph, Neill – vocals on "La Di Da Da"

Technical personnel

- Neill King – production, engineering, mixing
- Superdave Davis – production, engineering and mixing assistance
- Steve Smart – mastering
- Heath Bradby – management
- John "Wombo" O'Donnell – A&R
- Ben Steele – sleeve design and layout
- Nick Cowie – sleeve photography
- Chris Daymond – sleeve photography
- Digby – sleeve photography

== Charts ==
=== Weekly charts ===
Chart (1997–98)	Peak position
Australian Albums (ARIA)	7

=== Year-end charts ===
(1998)	Position
Australian Albums (ARIA)	54

== Release history ==
Region	Date	Format(s)	Label	Catalogue	Ref.
Australia	8 September 1997	CD	Murmur	MATTCD056	
Australia	8 September 1997	Vinyl	Murmur	MATTV056	
Japan	21 March 1998	CD	Epic	ESCA 6938	
Australia	26 August 2016	CD	Murmur	88985368232	
Australia	21 April 2018	Vinyl	Sony Music	88985426191	
Australia	22 August 2025	Vinyl	Murmur, Sony Music	19802918851	
