= Military Strongmen =

1997 single by Jebediah

Single by Jebediah

from the album Slightly Odway
- Released: 11 October 1997
- Recorded: 1997
- Genre: Alternative rock
- Length: 3:27
- Label: Murmur
- Songwriter(s): Chris Daymond, Kevin Mitchell, Vanessa Thornton, Brett Mitchell
- Producer(s): Neill King

Jebediah singles chronology
| "Leaving Home" (1997) | "Military Strongmen" (1997) | "Teflon" (1998) |

"Military Strongmen" is a song by Australian alternative rock band, Jebediah. It was released as a single as the second single from the band's debut studio album Slightly Odway on 11 October 1997 as the and peaked at No. 65 on the ARIA Singles Chart and was voted in at number 33 in Triple J's Hottest 100 music poll for 1997.

The single release was slightly different from the album version as it was remixed with heavier guitars. The song was mixed by American audio engineer, Chris Lord-Alge. The cover image is of the 1915 art deco style Astor Cinema on the intersection of Beaufort and Walcott Streets in Mount Lawley, Western Australia.

== Music video ==
The music video was filmed at the Astor Cinema in the Perth suburb of Mount Lawley. The video featured the band playing in front of the cinema's screen while dressed in costumes. In a documentary, Jebediaries (2000), the band's then-manager, Heath Bradby, stated that "Military Strongmen" is his favourite music video.

== Track listing ==
All tracks are written by Chris Daymond, Brett Mitchell, Kevin Mitchell and Vanessa Thornton,

| No. | Title | Length |
|---|---|---|
| 1. | "Military Strongmen" | 3:27 |
| 2. | "Weekend Away" | 4:36 |
| 3. | "Slightly Odway" | 2:56 |
| 4. | "Slow Down" | 4:23 |

== Credits ==
Jebediah members

- Chris Daymond – guitar
- Brett Mitchell – drums
- Kevin Mitchell – vocals
- Vanessa Thornton – bass guitar

Recording details

- Chris Lord-Alge – mixer
- Ben Steele – photography, layout, design
- Neill King – producer
- Laurie Singara – recording ("Weekend Away", "Slightly Odway", "Slow Down")

== Charts ==
| Chart (1997) | Peak position |
|---|---|
| Australia (ARIA) | 65 |
