= Twitch (EP) =

EP by Jebediah
- Released: 5 August 1996
- Recorded: March 1996
- Genre: Alternative rock
- Length: 18:07
- Label: Murmur
- Producer: Chris Dickie

Jebediah EP chronology
Twitch (1996)	Slightly Odway (1997)

Twitch is an EP, and the first official release, by Australian alternative rock band Jebediah. It was released on 5 August 1996 by record label Murmur.

== Background and recording ==
In January 1996 Jebediah were selected to play the local leg of the Summersault Festival, run by promoter Steve Pavlovic, which featured Beastie Boys, Foo Fighters, Sonic Youth, Beck, Pavement and Rancid. In March that year they recorded five songs with Chris Dickie – an English sound engineer who had worked with The Pogues, Morrissey and Depeche Mode before moving to Australia in 1994 – at the Poons Head Studios in Western Australia. These were the first songs that the band had ever recorded.

In April the band signed with Murmur, an imprint of Sony Music Australia, following which they embarked on a number of national tours. The first with label stable-mates Something for Kate (called "Unipalooza") was for six weeks, performing at universities all around Australia. This was followed by supporting Snout and Automatic on their national tour in June. The band also won its first WAMi award for 'Best Stage Presence' that year.

== Content ==
"Superhero 6 1/2" refers to "Almin" – this is a reference to the band's original drummer, Almin Fulurija, who only lasted one rehearsal session.

The third track from the EP, "Smiler", appeared on the compilation album Edible 96 – The Best in Australian Campus Bands in August 1996, on the Troy Horse label. Another track, "Tracksuit", was re-recorded and appeared on the vinyl version of the band's debut album, Slightly Odway.

== Release ==
Twitch was released on 5 August 1996 by record label Murmur on CD, and was also released as a limited edition vinyl record, with 800 hand-numbered copies made. It peaked at No. 61 on the ARIA Singles Chart, and debuted at No. 1 in the Western Australia ARIA chart.

== Critical reception ==
Australian musicologist Ian McFarlane felt that Twitch "featured quirky tracks like 'Mister Masonic' and 'Tracksuit' and was a strong taster for the band's fuzzy pop. It caused a sensation in hometown Perth." Ed Nimmervoll, writing for AllMusic, stated that "[they established] themselves on the indie charts with the EP Twitch and a single, 'Jerks of Attention'".

In September 1997 Christie Eliezer of Billboard rated Jebediah as one of ten best new artists from Australia, based on the EP and their debut album, Slightly Odway. In March 2005 Joseph Kim of vibwire.net felt Twitch and Frente's Ordinary Angels (1992) were the two most enjoyable EPs he had heard, containing "a host of great songs, rather than just being accompanied by filler tracks."

== Track listing ==
All tracks are written by Chris Daymond, Kevin Mitchell, Vanessa Thornton and Brett Mitchell

No.	Title	Length
1.	"Mister Masonic"	4:01
2.	"Ferris Wheel"	3:10
3.	"Smiler"	2:39
4.	"Superhero 6½"	3:27
5.	"Tracksuit"	4:50

== Personnel ==
Jebediah

- Kevin Mitchell – vocals, guitar
- Chris Daymond – guitar
- Vanessa Thornton – bass
- Brett Mitchell – drums

Technical personnel

- Chris Dickie – producer
- Andrew Christie – artwork
- Shelley Peat – layout and design

== Charts ==
Chart (1996)	Peak position
Australia (ARIA)	61
