= Redline Records =

Australian record company

- Founder: Jebediah and Naked Ape Management
- Distributor(s): Shock Records
- Genre: Various
- Country of origin: Australia

Redline Records was an independent record label based in Perth, Australia. Started in the year 2000 as a joint project between the band, Jebediah, and its management company, Naked Ape Management, the label predominantly released recordings of Australian indie bands under licensing agreements. Redline Records was distributed by Shock Records in Australia and New Zealand.

Following the final stage of the label's life, in which two albums and one EP were released in 2004 and 2005, respectively, the label's operations were closed without a press release. Since the cessation of Redline Records, artists from the label's roster have either disbanded, entered a period of hiatus or have moved on to other contractual arrangements.

== History ==
Kevin Mitchell, member of Jebediah, has explained in relation to the formation of the label:

I think we were all pretty naive about what we, what we were achieving—we were having too much fun to get kind of caught up. We'd just released our second album overseas on an independent label; and, spent time in America as an independent act. And that was around about the time where we started our own label, just to, um, release, maybe, release a few, some bands of friends of ours, in bands.

== Former staff ==
- Managing director and A&R: Heath Bradby

== Deregistration ==
The official label name, "REDLINE RECORDS AUSTRALIA PTY LTD", was listed as deregistered on the Australian Securities and Investments Commission's "National Names Index" on 18 December 2011.

== Artists ==
- Jebediah
- Adam Said Galore
- Gyroscope
- Sekiden
- Bob Evans
- Big Heavy Stuff
- Front End Loader
- Blueline Medic
- Idlewild
- Jimmy Eat World
- The Nation Blue

== Post-label activity ==
Bradby, as of 2012, works as the Head of A&R for Warner Music Australia, in addition to overseeing his management company, The Fidelity Corporation.

Following a period of hiatus, Jebediah released its fifth album, Kosciuszko, in 2011, and lead singer and rhythm guitarist, Kevin Mitchell, relocated to Melbourne, Australia. The band entered into an arrangement with a new management company, Catherine Haridy Management, prior to the release of Kosciuszko.

== See also ==
- List of record labels
