= Harpoon (Jebediah song) =

Single by Jebediah

from the album Slightly Odway
- Released: 22 June 1998
- Recorded: 1997
- Length: 4:26
- Label: Murmur
- Producer: Neill King

Jebediah singles chronology
"Teflon" (1998)	"Harpoon" (1998)	"Animal" (1999)

Harpoon is a song by Australian alternative rock band Jebediah. It was released in June 1998 as the fourth and final single from the band's debut studio album,Slightly Odway and peaked at number 46 on the Australian ARIA Singles Chart.

The single contains a cover version of "Harpoon" by Melbourne-based band and label mates Something for Kate. Jebediah's lead singer Kevin Mitchell was interviewed in May 2014 by Richard Kingsmill on national youth broadcaster Triple J, recalling: "He (Paul Dempsey) got a few words wrong, but that's OK, I can understand! Actually, the first time I heard it was live, at Pushover. It was great. That's the first time we'd ever heard a band play one of our songs. It was such a buzz. And the fact that they did it so well was even cooler."

The single also includes Jebediah's cover version of Something for Kate's track "Clint", which appeared on that band's 1996 EP ....The Answer to Both Your Questions. Something for Kate included the Jebediah cover of "Clint" as the B-side on their 1998 single, "Roll Credit". Dempsey, Something for Kate's guitarist-singer-songwriter, explained to Kingsmill: "In true Jebediah style, it has a lot of energy and it's a lot poppier. I think it has more appeal than the original. When we listen to our version of it, it drags. It's muddy. And then you hear the Jebediah version and it automatically puts a smile on your face. It just picks you up. You could jump off stages to their version."

== Music video ==
The "black-and-white" music video for "Harpoon" featured the animated artwork of an artist who used charcoal on paper. In the Sony-produced documentary Jebediaries, lead singer Kevin Mitchell explains that the artist based the animation on the single's cover art.

== Reception ==
In a review on U-WIRE, Amanda Fazzone describes the song as "an Oasis-style track (complete with chimes) that sustains rhythm and momentum but suffers from the repetition of its cliched Brit poppy [sic] chorus ("like a harpoon in my heart"), hard to say whether its tongue-in-cheek or heart-on-sleeve. A brief gorgeous guitar melody saves the song, but Mitchell's voice becomes tedious until the song's culmination in a few broad acoustic brushstokes."

== Triple J Hottest 100 placings ==
"Harpoon" appeared twice in the 1998 Triple J Hottest 100, a poll of listeners of the national radio station, with Jebediah's original listed at number 7 and Something for Kate's cover version at number 85. It was the first time that two versions of the same song polled in the same Hottest 100 list.

In June 2013 Triple J conducted a poll to celebrate the 20th anniversary of the Hottest 100's current format, with "Harpoon" listed at number 91 of the Hottest 100 of the Past 20 Years.

== Track listing ==
All tracks are written by Chris Daymond, Brett Mitchell, Kevin Mitchell and Vanessa Thornton, unless otherwise indicated

No.	Title	Writer(s)	Length
1.	"Harpoon"		4:26
2.	"Harpoon" (performed by Something for Kate)		4:19
3.	"Clint"	Paul Dempsey, Julian Carroll, Clint Hyndman	5:16
4.	"Sorry"		3:10
5.	"Ski Trip"		2:25
6.	"I Ran"	Mike Score, Ali Score, Frank Maudsley, Paul Reynolds	4:07

== Charts ==
Chart (1998)	Peak position
Australia (ARIA)	46
