= Jerks of Attention =

Single by Jebediah

from the album Slightly Odway
- Released: 8 December 1996
- Recorded: August 1996
- Studio: Birdland Studio, Melbourne
- Genre: Alternative rock
- Length: 10:56
- Label: Murmur
- Songwriters: Chris Daymond, Kevin Mitchell, Brett Mitchell, Vanessa Thornton
- Producers: Lindsay Gravina, Mikey Alonso

Jebediah singles chronology
"Jerks of Attention" (1996)	"Leaving Home" (1997)

"Jerks of Attention" is a song by Australian alternative rock band Jebediah, recorded in August 1996, in Melbourne at the Birdland Studio, and produced by Lindsay Gravina and Mikey Alonso. "Jerks of Attention" was released on 8 December 1996 as the band's debut single and peaked at No. 62 on the ARIA Singles Chart. "Jerks of Attention" was re-recorded and included on the band's debut album, Slightly Odway (1997).

At the ARIA Music Awards of 1997 Jebediah were nominated for Best New Talent for the single. Also that year it received a WAMi Award for "Most Popular Song".

The lyrics refer to smoking cannabis.

== Music video ==
The music video for "Jerks of Attention" was the band's first and was filmed in the 'share-house' that Kevin Mitchell was residing in at the time. The band is depicted performing live in one of the house's rooms, in which naked light bulbs hang from the ceiling. While the band play, a party is gathering at the house and a male in an apron is baking a cake. Photographer and internet administrator, Nick Cowie is also portrayed with bright red hair and leather pants and is chained to a sink.

== Different versions ==
The original single was re-recorded with a slower tempo for inclusion on Jebediah's debut album, Slightly Odway.

== Limited edition release ==
The single was also released as a limited edition vinyl recording, with only 250 copies made for the Perth release (the Perth copies were hand-numbered and stamped).

== Track listing ==
No.	Title	Length
1.	"Jerks of Attention"	4:16
2.	"Denver"	2:36
3.	"Bosco"	4:04

== Charts ==
Chart (1997)	Peak position
Australia (ARIA)	62
