= Richard Clapton discography =

- Studio albums: 16
- Soundtrack albums: 1
- Live albums: 3
- Compilation albums: 6
- Singles: 41

The discography of Australian musician Richard Clapton spawned sixteen studio albums, six compilation albums, three live albums, one soundtrack album, and forty-one singles. He is best known for his 1975 single "Girls on the Avenue". Clapton's highest charting release was his 2021 album, Music Is Love (1966–1970), which peaked at 3 on the ARIA Charts.

At the ARIA Music Awards of 1999, Clapton was inducted into the ARIA Hall of Fame. In 2010, Clapton was inducted into the Australian Songwriters Hall of Fame.

== Albums ==
=== Studio albums ===
List of studio albums, with selected chart positions
Title	Album details	Peak chart positions
Title	Album details	AUS
Prussian Blue	Released: November 1973; Label: Infinity / Festival (L 34956)	—
Girls on the Avenue	Released: April 1975; Label: Infinity / Festival (L 35508)	33
Main Street Jive	Released: August 1976; Label: Infinity / Festival (L 35963)	64
Goodbye Tiger	Released: October 1977; Label: Infinity / Festival (L 36352)	11
Hearts on the Nightline	Released: April 1979; Label: Interfusion / Festival (L 36932)	17
Dark Spaces	Released: August 1980; Label: Interfusion / Festival (L 37331)	23
The Great Escape	Released: February 1982; Label: WEA (600106)	8
Solidarity	Released: September 1984; Label: Mushroom (RML 53137)	27
Glory Road	Released: October 1987; Label: WEA (600144-1)	28
Distant Thunder	Released: May 1993; Label: Columbia Records (473531)	37
Angeltown	Released: May 1996; Label: Roadshow Music (17982-2)	89
Diamond Mine	Released: May 2004; Label: Warner Bros.	90
Rewired	Released: April 2006; Label:Warner Bros.	215
Harlequin Nights	Released: August 2012; Label: Gypsy Music	135
The House of Orange	Released: 8 April 2016; Label: Gypsy Music	112
Music Is Love (1966–1970)	Released: 9 April 2021; Label: Bloodlines/Mushroom Group	3
"—" denotes releases that did not chart or were not released in that country.

=== Live albums ===
List of live albums, with selected chart positions
Title	Album details	Peak chart positions	Certifications
Title	Album details	AUS	Certifications
The Best Years of Our Lives	Released: September 1989; Label: WEA (256582-1)	23	ARIA: Platinum
Up and Down the Glory Road	Released: 12 November 2001; Label: WEA/WAR (0927422332)	(6^{°})	ARIA: Gold (DVD)
Live at the State Theatre	Released: 2008; Label: WEA	—	
"—" denotes releases that did not chart or were not released in that country.

Notes

- ° Australian Music DVD Chart.

=== Compilation albums ===
List of compilation albums, with selected chart positions
Title	Album details	Peak chart positions	Certification
Title	Album details	AUS	Certification
Past Hits and Previews	Released: December 1978; Label: Infinity / Festival (L 36691)	42	
The Very Best of Richard Clapton	Released: March 1982; Label: Festival (L 37674)	18	
The Definitive Anthology	Released: October 1999; Label: WEA (3984294362)	28	ARIA: Gold
The Definitive Collection	Released: 2004; Label: Festival	—	
The Essential Hits	Released: 13 August 2010; Label: Warner	—	
Best Years 1974–2014	Released: 8 August 2014; Label: Festival / Warner	36	
"—" denotes releases that did not chart or were not released in that country.

=== Soundtrack albums ===
List of live albums, with selected chart positions
Title	Album details	Peak chart positions
Title	Album details	AUS
Highway One	Released: 1977; Label: Infinity / Festival (L 36138)	94

== Singles ==
Year	Title	Peak chart positions	Album
Year	Title	AUS	Album
1972	"Last Train to Marseilles"	—	Prussian Blue
1973	"All the Prodigal Children"	—	Prussian Blue
1974	"I Wanna Be a Survivor"	—	Prussian Blue
1975	"Travelling Down the Castlereagh" / "Girls on the Avenue"^{[A]}	4	Girls on the Avenue
1975	"Down the Road"	—	Girls on the Avenue
1976	"Please Come Home"	—	Non-album single
1976	"Suit Yourself"	—	Main Street Jive
1977	"Capricorn Dancer"	40	Highway One
1977	"Deep Water"	43	Goodbye Tiger
1978	"(Down in the) Lucky Country"	70	Goodbye Tiger
1978	"Steppin' Across the Line"	98	Past Hits and Previews
1979	"Hearts on the Nightline"	—	Hearts on the Nightline
1979	"Ace of Hearts"	—	Hearts on the Nightline
1980	"Get Back to the Shelter"	94	Dark Spaces
1980	"High Society"	—	Dark Spaces
1982	"I Am an Island"	20	The Great Escape
1982	"Spellbound"	89	The Great Escape
1982	"The Best Years of Our Lives"	—	The Great Escape
"—" denotes a recording that did not chart or was not released in that territory.

Year	Title	Peak chart positions	Album
Year	Title	AUS	Album
1984	"The Heart of It"	90	Solidarity
1984	"Solidarity Goodbye"	—	Solidarity
1985	"Goodbye Barbara Ann"	90	Non-album single
1985	"The Transpac Slide"	—	Non-album single
1986	"Spirit of Sydney" (duet with Kevin Borich)	—	Non-album single
1987	"Glory Road"	42	Glory Road
1987	"Trust Somebody"	—	Glory Road
1988	"Angelou"	—	Glory Road
1988	"Go Windward Passage" (with Crew of Windward Passage)	—	Non-album single
1989	"Deep Water" (live)	147	Best Years of Our Lives
1989	"Ace of Hearts" (live)	122	Best Years of Our Lives
1992	"Happy Valley"	110	Distant Thunder
1993	"Distant Thunder"	80	Distant Thunder
1993	"All Fall Down"	128	Distant Thunder
1994	"Oceans of the Heart"	—	Distant Thunder
1996	"Dixieland"	182	Angeltown
1999	"Calling for You"	—	The Definitive Anthology
2012	"Dancing with the Vampires"	—	Harlequin Nights
2016	"Something About You"	—	The House of Orange
2021	"Summer in the City"	—	Music Is Love (1966-1970)
2021	"Cinnamon Girl"	—	Music Is Love (1966-1970)
"—" denotes a recording that did not chart or was not released in that territory.

== Notes ==
A."Girls on the Avenue" was originally released as the B-side of "Travelling Down the Castlereagh". After considerable radio play it was named the A-side.
