= Richard Clapton – The Definitive Anthology =

Greatest hits album by Richard Clapton
- Released: October 1999
- Recorded: 1974–1999
- Label: WEA

Richard Clapton chronology
Angeltown (1996)	Richard Clapton – The Definitive Anthology (1999)	Up and Down the Glory Road (2001)

The Definitive Anthology is the third greatest hits album by Australian rock musician Richard Clapton. The album was released in October 1999 to coincide with his induction into the ARIA Hall of Fame at the ARIA Music Awards of 1999. The album covers songs from his career in chronological order, including two new tracks. The album peaked at number 28 on the ARIA Charts.

Talking about the track selection Clapton said "It was not a simple project, as there is so much music and culling it was painful at times. But it was a lot of fun. I looked back at my earlier songs when I was compiling this and I found that the naivete of some of them was really quite cute. I had a lot of fun with it."

== Reception ==
Warner Music said "One of the beauties of the Richard Clapton Definitive Anthology is simply the timelessness of his songs. The music, the song structures, the imagery and that distinctive voice all combines to create a sense of warmth and knowing, but doesn't allow any song to be pigeon-holed into any particular time frame." Continuing to say "From the opening bar of track one, to the final moments of the album, this is an astonishing bed of work from a singer, performer and master songwriter- an artist who has been as much a part of the musical lives of hippies, surfers, inner city dwellers and corporate suits. There is no song that you will skip past and no song that is not familiar. It's actually amazing just how many times you'll find yourself singing along to songs that you didn't realise you knew. Such is the power and subtle skills of Richard's words and blissful waves of gentle rock."

== Track listing ==
All tracks are written by Richard Clapton (unless noted)

No.	Title	Writer(s)	Album	Length
1.	"Girls on the Avenue"		Girls on the Avenue	3:15
2.	"Capricorn Dancer"		Highway One	3:52
3.	"Down in the Lucky Country"		Goodbye Tiger
4.	"Deep Water"		Goodbye Tiger
5.	"Goodbye Tiger"		Goodbye Tiger
6.	"Get Back to Shelter"		Dark Spaces
7.	"I Am an Island"		The Great Escape
8.	"The Best Years of Our Lives"		The Great Escape
9.	"Solidarity"		Solidarity
10.	"Trust Somebody"		Glory Road
11.	"Glory Road"		Glory Road
12.	"Ace of Hearts" (live)		The Best Years of Our Lives	5:15
13.	"Distant Thunder"		Distant Thunder
14.	"Oceans of the Heart"		Distant Thunder
15.	"Calling for You"	Richard Clapton, Tim Ferris, Guy Delandro	The Definitive Anthology
16.	"Little Pilgrims"		The Definitive Anthology

Bonus Disc
No.	Title	Writer(s)	Length
1.	"Blue Bay Blues"
2.	"The Universal"
3.	"Walk On Water"
4.	"Angelou"
5.	"Real Love"
6.	"Love Is Strong"	Richard Clapton, Michael Hegarty, Mark Edwards
7.	"Everybody's Making Money"

== Charts ==
Chart (1999)	Peak position
Australian Albums (ARIA)	28

== Certification ==
Region	Certification	Certified units/sales
Australia (ARIA)	Gold	35,000^{^}
^{^} Shipments figures based on certification alone.

== Release history ==
Country	Date	Label	Format	Catalogue
Australia	October 1999	WEA Records	2xCD	3984294362
