= All Fall Down =

All Fall Down may refer to:

- "... all fall down", a phrase from the nursery rhyme "Ring a Ring o' Roses" which first appeared in print in 1881

== Books ==
=== Comics ===
- All Fall Down (comics), a 2011 six-issue comic book by Casey Jones
- "All Fall Down", a 1990 issue of the Matrix Quest series of Transformers comics

=== Nonfiction ===
- All Fall Down, The Brandon deWilde Story, a 2012 biography by Patrisha McLean
- All Fall Down: America's Tragic Encounter With Iran, a 1985 book by Gary Sick

=== Novels ===
- All Fall Down (Carter novel), by Ally Carter, 2015
- All Fall Down (Herlihy novel), by James Leo Herlihy, 1960
- All Fall Down, by Megan Hart, 2012
- All Fall Down, by Jean Little
- All Fall Down, by Sally Nicholls, 2012
- All Fall Down, by Leonard Strong, 1944
- All Fall Down, by Jennifer Weiner, 2014
- All Fall Down: The Landslide Diary of Abby Roberts, Frank, District of Alberta, 1902, by Jean Little, 2014

=== Other ===
- All Fall Down, a 1963 poetry collection by Alan Jackson
- All Fall Down, a 1994 play by Wendy Lill
- All Fall Down, a 2009 story collection by Mary Caponegro

== Film and television ==
- All Fall Down (1962 film), a film directed by John Frankenheimer, based on the novel by James Leo Herlihy
- All Fall Down (Sapphire & Steel), a 2005 audio drama based on the TV series Sapphire & Steel

=== Television episodes ===
- "All Fall Down" (Australian Playhouse), 1967
- "All Fall Down" (The Big Comfy Couch), 1994
- "All Fall Down" (The Bill), 2000
- "All Fall Down" (The Colbys), 1987
- "All Fall Down" (CSI: Miami), 2010
- "All Fall Down" (Danger Mouse), 1986
- "All Fall Down" (Miami Medical), 2010
- "All Fall Down" (The Mothers-in-Law), 1967
- "All Fall Down" (Past Life), 2010
- "All Fall Down" (Shameless), 2012
- "All Fall Down" (Voyagers!), 1983
- "All Fall Down", an episode of Code Name: Eternity
- "All Fall Down", an episode of Peep and the Big Wide World, 2004
- "All Fall Down", an episode of Best of Luck Nikki (an Indian adaptation of Good Luck Charlie), 2014

== Music ==
=== Albums ===
- All Fall Down (The 77s album), 1984
- All Fall Down (Against All Authority album) or the title song, 1998
- All Fall Down (The Sound album) or the title song, 1982
- All Fall Down (Shawn Colvin album) or the title song, 2012
- All Fall Down, by Jim Fox
- All Fall Down, by Susan Herndon, 2010
- All Fall Down, an EP by the King Blues, 2004

=== Songs ===
- "All Fall Down" (Camo & Krooked song), 2011
- "All Fall Down" (Five Star song), 1985
- "All Fall Down" (Ultravox song), 1986
- "All Fall Down" (The Vampire Lestat song), 2026
- "All Fall Down", by Anastacia from Heavy Rotation, 2008
- "All Fall Down", by Bic Runga, a B-side of the single "Suddenly Strange", 1997
- "All Fall Down", by Billy Bragg from Volume 2, 2006
- "All Fall Down", by Gary Hughes from The Reissues, 2000
- "All Fall Down", by George Jones, with Emmylou Harris, from Friends in High Places, 1991
- "All Fall Down", by Good Riddance from For God and Country, 1995
- "All Fall Down", by Heiruspecs from Small Steps, 2002
- "All Fall Down", by Kaz James from If They Knew, 2008
- "All Fall Down", by Kevin Gilbert from Thud, 1995
- "All Fall Down", by Lindisfarne from Dingly Dell, 1972
- "All Fall Down", by MercyMe from Almost There, 2001
- "All Fall Down", by Midget, 1998
- "All Fall Down", by Missing Persons from Rhyme & Reason, 1984
- "All Fall Down", by OneRepublic from Dreaming Out Loud, 2007
- "All Fall Down", by Platinum Blonde from Platinum Blonde, 1983
- "All Fall Down", by Primal Scream, 1985
- "All Fall Down", by Richard Clapton, 1993
- "All Fall Down", by Russell Dickerson from Yours, 2017
- "All Fall Down", by Sarah Masen from Sarah Masen, 1996
- "All Fall Down", by Shawn Mullins from 9th Ward Pickin Parlor, 2006
- "All Fall Down", by TZU from Computer Love, 2008
- "All Fall Down", by William Finn from the musical revue Infinite Joy, 2000

== See also ==
- Fall Down (disambiguation)
- All Falls Down (disambiguation)
- We All Fall Down (disambiguation)
