= Past Hits and Previews =

Compilation album by Richard Clapton
- Released: December 1978
- Recorded: 1973–1978
- Label: Infinity/Festival
- Producer: Richard Batchens

Richard Clapton chronology
Goodbye Tiger (1977)	Past Hits and Previews (1978)	Hearts on the Nightline (1979)

Singles from Past Hits and Previews
- 1. "Stepping Across the Line" Released: November 1978

Past Hits and Previews is the first greatest hits album by Australian rock musician Richard Clapton. The album was released in December 1978 and peaked at number 42 on the Kent Music Report Albums Chart.

The album includes tracks from all four of Clapton's studio albums to date, as well as "Capricorn Dancer" from Highway One soundtrack and two new tracks recorded in 1978, "Steppin' Across the Line" and "When the Heat's Off" during the Hearts on the Nightline recording session.

== Track listing ==
All tracks are written by Richard Clapton

Side A
No.	Title	Length
1.	"Stepping Across the Line"	4:03
2.	"Girls on the Avenue"	3:58
3.	"Goodbye Tiger"	5:47
4.	"Capricorn Dancer"	3:16
5.	"I Wanna Be a Survivor"	4:03

Side B
No.	Title	Length
1.	"When the Heat's Off"	3:18
2.	"Deep Water"	5:28
3.	"Blue Bay Blues"	4:52
4.	"Need a Visionary"	4:41
5.	"Suit Yourself"	2:33

== Charts ==
Chart (1978/79)	Peak position
Australian Albums (Kent Music Report)	42

== Release history ==
Country	Date	Label	Format	Catalogue
Australia	December 1978	Infinity Records / Festival Records	LP	L 36691
Australia	1992	Infinity	CD	D 19585
