= The Very Best of Richard Clapton =

Compilation album by Richard Clapton
- Released: March 1982
- Recorded: 1973–1980
- Label: Infinity/Festival
- Producer: Richard Batchens, Dallas Smith, Richard Clapton

Richard Clapton chronology
The Great Escape (1982)	The Very Best of Richard Clapton (1982)	Solidarity (1984)

The Very Best of Richard Clapton is the second greatest hits album by Australian rock musician Richard Clapton. The album was released in March 1982 and peaked at number 18 on the Kent Music Report Albums Chart.

== Background and release ==
From 1973-1980, Clapton released six studio albums with Infinity /Festival before signing with WEA for the release of The Great Escape which was released in February 1982 and peaked at number 8 and scored Clapton his second top twenty single "I Am an Island". As a result, Infinity/Festival released another greatest hits collection.

== Track listing ==
All tracks are written by Richard Clapton

Side A
No.	Title	Length
1.	"Girls on the Avenue"	3:16
2.	"Stepping Across the Line"	4:06
3.	"Ace of Hearts"	4:38
4.	"Capricorn Dancer"	3:52
5.	"I Wanna Be a Survivor"	3:58
6.	"Down the Road"	4:17
7.	"Get Back to the Shelter"	5:26
8.	"Goodbye Tiger"	5:40

Side B
No.	Title	Length
1.	"Down in the Lucky Country"	3:42
2.	"Deep Water"	5:24
3.	"Blue Bay Blues"	4:27
4.	"Need a Visionary"	3:45
5.	"Suit Yourself"	3:27
6.	"High Society"	4:52
7.	"Hearts On the Nightline"	3:46
8.	"Dark Spaces"	6:48

== Charts ==
Chart (1982)	Peak position
Australian Albums (Kent Music Report)	18

== Release history ==
Country	Date	Label	Format	Catalogue
Australia	March 1982	Infinity Records / Festival Records	LP	L-37674
Australia	April 1989	Infinity	CD, Cassette	D 37674 / C 37674
