= Best Years 1974–2014 =

Greatest hits album by Richard Clapton
- Released: 11 August 2014
- Recorded: 1972–2014
- Length: 3:56:40
- Label: Festival Music

Richard Clapton chronology
Harlequin Nights (2012)	Best Years 1974–2014 (2014)	The House of Orange (2016)

Best Years 1974–2014 (Subtitled The 40th Anniversary Collection) is a 3CD + DVD greatest hits album by Australian rock musician Richard Clapton. The album was released in August 2014 to coincide with the release of Clapton's autobiography of the same name. The album covers songs from his career, (commencing in 1972, despite the title) in chronological order and includes a live DVD from The Best Years of Our Lives tour form 1989, available of DVD for the first time. The album peaked at number 36 on the ARIA Charts.

== Reception ==
Shane Pinnegar from 100% Rock called the album "a magnificent listen" and gave the album 9/10 saying "Clapton's songs are timeless and wonderfully evocative, and this box set...is a timely reminder of the many coulda-woulda-shoulda been hits he has to his name."

Ian McFarlane considers Clapton "to be one of the most important song writers this country has ever produced" and said "This is a magnificent listening experience".

== Track listing ==
CD1

1. "Last Train to Marseilles" - 3:24
2. "Prussian Blue" - 5:42
3. "Blue Bay Blues" - 4:44
4. "Throw Me Down a Line" - 3:10
5. "Girls on the Avenue" - 3:18
6. "Please Come Home" - 3:35
7. "Kicking the Moon Around" - 4:03
8. "Casanova's Got the Blues" - 5:58
9. "Need A Visionary" - 3:41
10. "Suit Yourself" - 3:40
11. "Highway One #2 (Children of the Sun)" - 5:15
12. "Capricorn Dancer" - 3:26
13. "Deep Water" - 5:28
14. "Down in the Lucky Country" - 3:42
15. "Goodbye Tiger" - 5:53
16. "Wintertime in Amsterdam" - 6:06
17. "Steppin' Across the Line" - 4:08
18. "The Ghost Train" (Demo) - 4:31

CD2

1. "Sometimes the Fire" - 7:28
2. "Get Back to the Shelter" - 3:56
3. "Dark Spaces" - 5:56
4. "The Best Years of Our Lives" - 5:08
5. "I Am an Island" - 5:03
6. "The Universal" - 4:33
7. "Walk On Water" - 4:32
8. "Amsterdam" - 5:12
9. "Goodbye Barbara Ann" - 4:48
10. "Thorn in My Saddle" (Live) - 8:39
11. "Trust Somebody" - 4:22
12. "Glory Road" - 4:33
13. "Angelou" - 4:06
14. "Ace of Hearts" (Live) - 4:39
15. "Distant Thunder" - 5:28

CD3

1. "Oceans of the Heart" - 4:35
2. "Real Love" - 5:34
3. "That Moon" - 5:15
4. "Love Is Strong" - 4:12
5. "Diamond Mine" - 5:22
6. "What Does It Take to Get Lucky?" - 5:07
7. "Great Ocean Road" (Demo) - 3:48
8. "Liberty Bell" (Rewired Version) - 4:22
9. "Katy's Leaving Babylon" (Rewired Version) - 3:37
10. "High Society" (Rewired Version) - 3:33
11. "Heart On the Nightline"(Rewired Version) - 3:10
12. "Blue Skies" - 6:28
13. "Vapour Trails" - 6:31
14. "Blow Smoke Up At the Moon" - 3:30
15. "Dancing With the Vampires" - 5:04
16. "Sunny Side Up" - 4:18
17. "Strings & Wood" (Demo) - 4:37

DVD The Best Years of Our Lives

1. "Intro" - 1:43
2. "Deep Water" - 5:01
3. "Girls on the Avenue" - 4:01
4. "Capricorn Dancer" - 3:21
5. "Ralph on Cold Chisel" - 0:48
6. "Trust Someone" - 4:28
7. "High Society" - 4:38
8. "Ralph on INXS" - 0:52
9. "Ace of Hearts" - 4:53
10. "Blue Bay Blues" - 4:13
11. "Angelou" - 4:03
12. "Katy's Leaving Babylon" - 2:28
13. "Ralph on Venetta Fields" - 1:44
14. "Ralph on Michael & Kirk" - 0:24
15. "Goodbye Tiger" - 7:05
16. "Down in the Lucky Country" - 4:30
17. "I Am an Island" - 6:00
18. "Glory Road" - 5:24
19. "The Best Years of Our Lives" - 4:30

== Charts ==
Chart (2014)	Peak position
Australian Albums (ARIA)	36

== Release history ==
Country	Date	Label	Format	Catalogue
Australia	August 2014	Festival Records	3xCD+DVD	FEST601034
