= Nothing Lasts Forever (Jebediah song) =

Single by Jebediah

from the album Jebediah
- Released: 18 February 2002
- Recorded: July–August 2001
- Genre: Alternative rock
- Length: 4:12
- Label: Murmur
- Songwriters: Chris Daymond, Brett Mitchell, Kevin Mitchell and Vanessa Thornton
- Producer: Magoo

Jebediah singles chronology
"Fall Down" (2001)	"Nothing Lasts Forever" (2002)	"N.D.C." (2002)

"Nothing Lasts Forever" is a song by Australian alternative rock band Jebediah. It was released on 18 February 2002 as the second single from the band's third studio album and reached number 50 on the Australian ARIA Singles Chart.

== Music video ==
The music video for the song featured the band in the town of Margaret River, Australia, and concludes with the sun setting over the Indian Ocean.

== Track listing ==
No.	Title	Length
1.	"Nothing Lasts Forever"	4:12
2.	"Closing Time"	6:09
3.	"Fall Down" (demo)	2:57
4.	"Run of the Company (Live at CBGB's)"	4:57
5.	"Animal (Live at CBGB's)"	4:56

== Charts ==
Chart (2002)	Peak position
Australia (ARIA)	50
