= New England (New England album) =

Studio album by New England
- Released: 1979
- Genres: Arena rock; pop rock
- Labels: Infinity Records LP; Renaissance Records CD
- Producers: Mike Stone, Paul Stanley

New England chronology
New England (1979)	Explorer Suite (1980)

Professional ratings
Review scores
Source	Rating
Allmusic	2.5/5 stars

New England is the debut album by the American rock band New England. The album was also issued on CD in 1998 by the US re-issue label Renaissance Records. The CD contains an un-marked bonus track, a different extended mix of "Don't Ever Wanna Lose Ya".

In February 2023, a remastered version, with six bonus tracks, was released on CD by Rock Candy Records.

== Track listing ==
All songs written and arranged by John Fannon.

1. "Hello, Hello, Hello" - 3:36
2. "Don't Ever Wanna Lose Ya" - 5:22
3. "P.U.N.K. (Puny Undernourished Kid)" - 3:24
4. "Shall I Run Away" - 5:10
5. "Alone Tonight" - 3:39
6. "Nothing to Fear" - 5:04
7. "Shoot" - 4:00
8. "Turn Out the Light" - 3:26
9. "The Last Show" - 3:51
10. "Encore" - 3:12

=== Bonus track on 1998 reissue ===
11. "Don't Ever Wanna Lose Ya" (extended mix) - 6:20

=== Bonus tracks on Rock Candy 2023 reissue ===
11. "Hello, Hello, Hello" (Live)
12. "Shoot" (Live)
13. "PUNK (Puny Undernourished Kid)" (Live)
14. "Shall I Run Away" (Live)
15. "Nothing to Fear" (Live)
16. "Don't Ever Wanna Lose Ya" (Live)

== Personnel ==
New England

- John Fannon - guitars, lead vocals
- Jimmy Waldo - keyboards, backing vocals
- Hirsh Gardner - drums, backing vocals, co-lead vocals on "Nothing to Fear"
- Gary Shea - bass guitar
