= Prussian Blue (album) =

Studio album by Richard Clapton
- Released: November 1973
- Genre: Rock
- Length: 38:00
- Label: Infinity; Festival
- Producer: Richard Batchens

Richard Clapton chronology
Prussian Blue (1973)	Girls on the Avenue (1975)

Singles from Prussian Blue
- 1. "Last Train to Marseilles" Released: October 1972; 2. "All the Prodigal Children" Released: October 1973; 3. "I Wanna Be a Survivor" Released: July 1974

Prussian Blue is the debut solo studio album by Australian rock musician, Richard Clapton, which was released in November 1973. It includes three singles, "Last Train to Marseilles" (October 1972), "All the Prodigal Children" (October 1973) and "I Wanna Be a Survivor" (July 1974). The album was produced by Richard Batchens, who later produced some of Sherbet's albums. Prussian Blue failed to appear on the Kent Music Report Albums Chart.

== Reception ==
Garry Raffaele of The Canberra Times reviewed Prussian Blue in December 1973, he observed, "Clapton sounds as though he's involved with the real issues of our time — pollution, man's inhumanity to those who share Spaceship Earth with him, communication difficulties. He writes of these things but his words are not likely to convince anybody. It's the simplistic trap again."

== Track listing ==
All tracks are written by Richard Clapton

Side A
No.	Title	Length
1.	"Hardly Know Myself"	3:32
2.	"Southern Germany"	4:13
3.	"Poor Man's Saviour"	3:22
4.	"Strange Days in Chippendale"	3:31
5.	"Prussian Blue"	5:41

Side B
No.	Title	Length
1.	"I Wanna Be a Survivor"	4:06
2.	"Last Train to Marseilles"	3:34
3.	"All the Prodigal Children"	4:03
4.	"Burning Ships"	4:01
5.	"The Lonesome Voyager"	2:36

== Personnel ==
Musicians

- Richard Clapton – vocals, acoustic guitar; harmonica (track 9)
- Keith Barber – drums (track 1, 6)
- Ian Bloxham – congas (track 1, 4), percussion (track 3)
- Tony Bolton – drums (track 7)
- Kevin Borich – lead guitar (track 1, 3, 6)
- John Capek – piano (track 7)
- John du Bois – bass guitar (track 7)
- Russell Dunlop – drums (track 5, 8, 9)
- the Fascinations – backing vocals (track 1, 8)
- Glen Gardier – lead guitar (track 4)
- Kenny Kitching – pedal steel guitar (track 2, 7, 8, 9)
- Mike Lawler – bass guitar (track 5, 8, 9)
- Mike McLelland – guitar (track 10)
- Red McKelvie – lead guitar (track 2, 7)
- Dave Ovenden – drums (track 2, 3)
- Ronnie Peel – bass guitar (track 1, 6)
- Mike Perjanik – piano (track 3), keyboards (track 5, 8), organ (track 6)
- Don Read – saxophone (track 1, 4, 5)
- Trevor Wilson – bass guitar (track 2, 3)

Recording details

- Richard Batchens – producer at Festival Studios, Sydney

Artwork

- Graham McCarter – cover photography
- Phillip Morris – back cover photography
- Stephen Nelson – design/art

== Release history ==
Country	Date	Label	Format	Catalogue
Australia	November 1973	Infinity Records/Festival Records	LP	L 34956
Australia	1993	Infinity Records	CD / Cassette	C 19593 / D 19593
Australia	16 August 2024	Warner Music Australia	CD / LP / digital	2173225822
