= Don't Ever Wanna Lose Ya =

1979 single by New England

Single by New England

from the album New England
- Released: May 1979
- Genre: Pop rock
- Length: 5:22
- Label: Infinity (LP); Renaissance (CD)
- Songwriter: John Fannon
- Producers: Paul Stanley; Mike Stone

New England singles chronology
"Don't Ever Wanna Lose Ya" (1979)	"Hello, Hello, Hello" / "Encore" (1979)

"Don't Ever Wanna Lose Ya" is the debut single by American rock band New England, released from their self-titled debut album (1979). Produced by Paul Stanley and Mike Stone, it is their most successful song, reaching number 40 on the Billboard Hot 100.

== Background ==
In an interview with VWMusic, John Fannon recounted the process of composing and recording the song:

Living in an apartment in those days, I wrote mostly on acoustic guitar. I am not sure I would have come up with the chords to the main intro hook on electric guitar because of the voicings I was playing. I did quickly figure out that it would be pretty cool with my Les Paul and Marshall. The lyrics came because it was raining pretty hard that night I was writing and thinking about a loved one getting home safely. When we recorded the demo we knew we had something special and then when we recorded it for our album and Mike Stone captured the power and energy of the band, the excitement was definitely building.

The original demo of the song did not have a guitar solo because Fannon was concerned about the length, but Paul Stanley wanted it have one since it was a rock song. Upon Fannon's request, Stanley sang the background vocals in the second and third verses of the song.

The song received heavy radio exposure on album-oriented rock (AOR) stations in the United States and was also added to radio stations in Canada, Japan and Europe.

== Composition ==
The instrumental of the song contains keyboards and guitar riffs. The lyrics focus on the singer's fear of losing his loved one.

== Critical reception ==
Classic Rock History ranked "Don't Ever Wanna Lose Ya" as the best song by New England.

== Charts ==
Chart (1979)	Peak position
US Billboard Hot 100	40
