= Sinclair Bros. =

Australian musical duo

- Origin: Australia
- Genres: Pop rock
- Years active: 1978–1980
- Labels: Infinity Records
- Past members: Wayne Sinclair, John Sinclair

Sinclair Bros. were a short lived Australian musical duo, consisting of brothers Wayne and John Sinclair. The duo released one studio album in 1979.

== Discography ==
=== Albums ===
Title	Details
Two Moons	Released: 1979; Label: (Infinity Records (L36845); Formats: Cassette, LP

=== Singles ===
List of singles, with Australian chart positions
Year	Title	Peak chart positions	Album
Year	Title	AUS	Album
1978	"Yesterfool"	42	Two Moons
1979	"Love Me Like I Love You"	-	Two Moons
1980	"It Must Be Autumn"	89	non album single
1980	"City Boy"	-	non album single
