= Highway One =

Highway One may refer to:

- Highway One (album), album by Bobby Hutcherson
- Highway One (film), 1977 Australian film
- "Highway One", a song by The Waifs from the album, Up All Night

== See also ==
- List of highways numbered 1
