= All Falls Down (disambiguation) =

"All Falls Down" is a song by American hip hop artist Kanye West.

All Falls Down may also refer to:

- "All Falls Down" (Alan Walker song)
- "All Falls Down", a song by Machine Head from the 2013 album Through the Ashes of Empires
- "All Falls Down", a song by Adelitas Way from the 2009 self-titled debut album
- "All Falls Down", a song by California Breed from the 2014 self-titled album
- "All Falls Down", a song by Lizzy McAlpine from the 2024 album Older
- "All Falls Down", a two-part episode from season 10 of Degrassi

== See also ==
- All Fall Down (disambiguation)
- We All Fall Down (disambiguation)
- "If It All Falls Down", a song from the 1986 Jimmy Buffett album Floridays
- "When It All Falls Down", a song by Ten Years After from the 2004 album Now
