= Hello, Hello, Hello =

1979 single by New England

Single by New England

from the album New England
- B-side: "Encore"
- Released: September 1979
- Genre: Pop rock
- Length: 3:36
- Label: Infinity (LP); Renaissance (CD)
- Songwriter(s): John Fannon
- Producer(s): Paul Stanley; Mike Stone

New England singles chronology
| "Don't Ever Wanna Lose Ya" (1979) | "Hello, Hello, Hello" (1979) | "P.U.N.K" / "Shoot" (1979) |

"Hello, Hello, Hello" is a song by American rock band New England and the second single from their self-titled debut album (1979). It was produced by Paul Stanley and Mike Stone.

== Background ==
While New England's previous single "Don't Ever Wanna Lose Ya" was still successful, Infinity Records released "Hello, Hello, Hello" as the next single. In an interview with VWMusic, John Fannon said the decision was a "big mistake".

The song received some airplay in album-oriented rock (AOR) stations.

== Composition ==
"Hello, Hello, Hello" is an upbeat song. In the lyrics, the singer attempts to lure a woman into a romantic relationship.

== Critical reception ==
Joe Viglione of AllMusic wrote, "'Hello, Hello, Hello,' much like Alice Cooper's use of Rolf Kemp's [sic] 'Hello Hooray,' is a nice opener, but the lyrics are more like Stevie Nicks witchcraft and magic."

Classic Rock History ranked "Hello, Hello, Hello" as the third best song by New England.

== Charts ==
| Chart (1979) | Peak position |
|---|---|
| US Billboard Hot 100 | 69 |
