= Fall Down =

Fall Down may refer to:

- "Fall Down" (Jebediah song) (2002)
- "Fall Down" (Tantric song) (2008)
- "Fall Down" (Toad the Wet Sprocket song) (1994)
- "Fall Down" (will.i.am song), featuring Miley Cyrus (2013)
- “Fall Down (Spirit of Love)”, a 1985 gospel song by Tramaine Hawkins
- "Fall Down (Like the Rain)", a 1988 song by the Mighty Lemon Drops from the album World Without End

== See also ==
- Falling Down (disambiguation)
