= Red McKelvie =

New Zealand singer-songwriter

- Red McKelvie live with Glen Moffatt, circa 2000.

Background information
- Born: Bertram John McKelvie
- Origin: Christchurch, New Zealand
- Genres: Country, rock, blues
- Occupations: Singer, songwriter, instrumentalist
- Instruments: Vocals, guitar, pedal steel, button accordion
- Years active: 1960s-2022
- Website: http://www.glenmoffatt.com/red_mckelvie.htm

Red McKelvie was a New Zealand singer-songwriter-instrumentalist and session musician who has been described as "Australasia's greatest pop guitarist".

He has appeared on albums by Richard Clapton (including the Australian hit "Girls on the Avenue") and The Flying Circus in Australia and Hello Sailor, Dave Dobbyn's DD Smash, Al Hunter and Glen Moffatt in New Zealand.

McKelvie's early forays in the music scene were as lead guitarist for such Auckland, New Zealand, bands as The Chelsea Beats, The Dark Ages and The Avengers, but it was upon his arrival in Sydney, Australia, in 1967 that he became a much in-demand sideman and session player.

Sydney bands in which McKelvie featured included The Starving Wild Dogs, alongside future Blackfeather pianist Paul Wyld, and Quill before he joined The Flying Circus and greatly influenced their flirtation with country music.

Despite the first single from The Flying Circus's Prepared in Peace LP being McKelvie's "Israel", McKelvie was sacked from the band for "confusing the band's direction".

McKelvie released singles as a solo artist and as leader of The Third Union Band and was lead guitarist on the first two Richard Clapton albums, including playing all the multilayered electric guitar on the Australian number two hit "Girls on the Avenue".

He returned to New Zealand in 1975 where he became a highly sought-after session musician, performed on Television New Zealand's primetime That's Country show and produced recordings for the country's queen of country music Patsy Riggir.

Bands McKelvie played with in Auckland, New Zealand, in the 1970s to the 1990s included Cruise Lane, with New Zealand's jingles king Murray Grindlay and Dragon songwriter Paul Hewson, the Al Hunter Band, the Glen Moffatt Band and his own Cajun combo Mumbo Gumbo.

McKelvie returned to his home town of Christchurch in 1997, and in 2007 finally released his debut solo album, Ridin' On Trains – Songs of New Zealand and Australia. Eight of the songs from the album appeared on the 2009 release Troubadours – NZ Singer/Songwriter Series: Vol 1, which also featured Glen Moffatt and Al Hunter.

Red McKelvie died in Geraldine on April 23, 2022.

== Discography ==
Albums
Date of release	Title	Label	Charted	Certification	Catalog Number
2007	Ridin' On Trains – Songs of New Zealand and Australia	SDL Music	–	–	SDL8042
2009	Troubadours – NZ Singer/Songwriter Series: Vol 1 – Glen Moffatt, Al Hunter, Red McKelvie	SDL Music	–	–	SDL8044/2
