= Jebediah (album) =

Studio album by Jebediah
- Released: 3 March 2002
- Recorded: July–August 2001
- Studio: Mangrove Studios, Australia
- Genre: Alternative rock
- Length: 48:00
- Label: Murmur
- Producer: Magoo

Jebediah chronology
Of Someday Shambles (1999)	Jebediah (2002)	Glee Sides and Sparities (2003)

Singles from Jebediah
- 1. "Fall Down" Released: 29 October 2001; 2. "Nothing Lasts Forever" Released: 18 February 2002; 3. "N.D.C." Released: July 2002

Jebediah is the third studio album by Australian alternative rock band Jebediah. It was recorded at Mangrove Studios, outside Sydney with producer Magoo, and released on 3 March 2002 by record label Murmur.

The album debuted at No. 8 on the ARIA Albums Chart and remained in the top 50 for five weeks.

== Recording ==
Jebediah was recorded from June to August 2001 at Mangrove Studios, outside Sydney, with production by Magoo (Regurgitator, Spiderbait, Midnight Oil).

== Content ==
Lead guitarist Chris Daymond explained the band's choice of an eponymous title:

Simply calling it Jebediah is something we wanted to do because it doesn't really point in either direction. We've used some in-jokes in the past in our work, things that are distinctly our style. Having a self-titled album this time around is a way of us being the same sort of band, but slightly older.
—Chris Daymond

Vocalist Kevin Mitchell clarified their musical direction:

It's got the raw, live feel, the way we perform songs musically and vocally, but with more of a studio feel than the previous ones as well. We came in with a pretty clear idea of what we wanted, just based on previous experience and how we knew we wanted to change. After the last album [Of Someday Shambles] we really wanted to breathe some life and spirit into this one.
—Kevin Mitchell

== Promotion ==
The album's lead single, "Fall Down", was released in October 2001, reaching No. 24 on the ARIA Singles Chart. The second single, "Nothing Lasts Forever", released in February 2002, peaked in the top 50. The third single, "N.D.C.", was released in July, reached the top 100. The fourth and final single, "October", released the same year, did not chart.

== Release ==
Jebediah was released on 3 March 2002 by record label Murmur. It debuted at number 8 on the ARIA Albums Chart, but did not achieve Gold record accreditation.

=== Sony contract ===
Following the release and promotion of Jebediah, Murmur (a subsidiary of Sony) ceased contractual arrangements with the band. In 2000 the group and their management company, Naked Ape Management (with Heath Bradby as CEO), had created their own label, Redline Records. The label subsequently issued the group's own material, which was distributed by Shock Records.

== Reception ==
Greg Lawrence of Whammo opined that it "sees a band in their element, brimming with confidence. Led by the tracks 'Fall Down' and 'Nothing Lasts Forever'". Ed Nimmervoll at Howlspace described their aim "for the third album they resolved to try to have fun again, recorded relatively quickly".

== Track listing ==
All tracks are written by Jebediah (Chris Daymond, Brett Mitchell, Kevin Mitchell and Vanessa Thornton)

No.	Title	Length
1.	"N.D.C."	3:07
2.	"Fall Down"	3:19
3.	"Number One"	4:53
4.	"Nothing Lasts Forever"	4:47
5.	"Eveready"	3:42
6.	"October"	3:50
7.	"Yesterday When I was Brave"	6:08
8.	"Gangsta"	3:38
9.	"If You Want It"	3:06
10.	"Country Holiday Song"	4:38
11.	"Ricochet"	2:36
12.	"Baltic Ballet"	4:10

== Personnel ==
Jebediah

- Chris Daymond – lead guitar
- Brett Mitchell – drums
- Kevin Mitchell – lead vocals, rhythm guitar
- Vanessa Thornton – bass guitar

Additional musicians

- Dave Orwell – pedal steel on "Country Holiday Song"
- Tylea Croucher – vocals on "Country Holiday Song"
- Jim MacDonald – bagpipes on "Fall Down"

Technical personnel

- Magoo – production, recording, mixing
- Mangrove Studios – recording studio

== Charts ==
Chart (2002)	Peak position
Australian Albums (ARIA)	8
