= Please Leave =

- "Please Leave", Blue Version

Single by Jebediah

from the album Of Someday Shambles
- Released: 13 March 2000
- Recorded: April–June 1999
- Genre: Alternative rock
- Length: 10:20
- Label: Murmur
- Songwriter(s): Chris Daymond, Brett Mitchell, Kevin Mitchell, Vanessa Thornton
- Producer(s): Mark Trombino

Jebediah singles chronology
| "Feet Touch the Ground" (1999) | "Please Leave" (2000) | "Fall Down" (2000) |

"Please Leave" is a song by Australian alternative rock band Jebediah. It was released on 13 March 2000 as the third and final single from the band's second studio album, Of Someday Shambles. "Please Leave" was co-written by all four band members, Chris Daymond, Brett Mitchell, Kevin Mitchell and Vanessa Thornton. Brett, the group's drummer, in a run through Of Someday Shambles' track list, described it as "The lost song. We played it at Planet (in Perth) before Slightly Odway. Kevin had written out the lyrics and gaffa taped them to Vanessa's back. After that we totally forgot about it and Chris found the lyric sheet in a guitar case somewhere."

"Please Leave" peaked at number 53 on the ARIA Singles Chart. It polled at number 30 on Triple J's Hottest 100 for 2000.

== Track listing ==
All tracks are written by Chris Daymond, Brett Mitchell, Kevin Mitchell and Vanessa Thornton

Brown version CD – Murmur / MATCD099
| No. | Title | Length |
|---|---|---|
| 1. | "Please Leave" | 3:35 |
| 2. | "Pharmacy 777" | 3:48 |
| 3. | "Tongue Twister" | 2:57 |
| 4. | "Feet Touch the Ground" (video) |

Blue version CD – Murmur / MATCD099A
| No. | Title | Length |
|---|---|---|
| 1. | "Please Leave" | 3:35 |
| 2. | "Puck Defender" (live) | 4:50 |
| 3. | "Invaders" (live) | 3:18 |
| 4. | "Skin" (live) | 3:35 |
| 5. | "Congratulations" (live) | 3:56 |

== Charts ==
| Chart (2000) | Peak position |
|---|---|
| Australia (ARIA) | 53 |

== Cover versions ==
A remix of "Please Leave" by fellow Perth band, Rhibosome, was included on the 2001 revised re-release of the band's 2000 split EP with American band, Jimmy Eat World.

The Grates, a band from Queensland, Australia, performed a cover version, for "Like a Version", a segment on national radio station, Triple J. Prior to performing the version, lead singer, Patience Hodgson, stated that Jebediah was the first live performance that she attended. Hodgson also revealed that Jebediah is a band that she continues to enjoy and will always play the band's music to international visitors.
