= Feet Touch the Ground =

Single by Jebediah

from the album Of Someday Shambles
- Released: 22 November 1999
- Recorded: April–June 1999
- Genre: Alternative rock
- Length: 13:26
- Label: Murmur
- Songwriters: Chris Daymond, Brett Mitchell, Kevin Mitchell, Vanessa Thornton
- Producer: Mark Trombino

Jebediah singles chronology
"Animal" (1999)	"Feet Touch the Ground" (1999)	"Please Leave" (2000)

"Feet Touch the Ground" is a song by Australian alternative rock band Jebediah. It was released on 22 November 1999 as the second single from the band's second studio album, Of Someday Shambles and peaked at number 73 on the ARIA Singles Chart and polled at number 28 on Triple J's Hottest 100 for 1999. The track was co-written by all four band members Chris Daymond, Brett Mitchell, Kevin Mitchell and Vanessa Thornton.

== Background ==
"Feet Touch the Ground" was recorded during the sessions for Of Someday Shambles, from April to June 1999, by Jebediah with American producer, Mark Trombino (Knapsack, Jimmy Eat World, Blink 182). The group's line-up was Chris Daymond on lead guitar, Kevin Mitchell on lead vocals and rhythm guitar, Vanessa Thornton on bass guitar and Kevin's older brother, Brett Mitchell, on drums. All four members co-wrote the track.

Brett Mitchell stated during a rundown of the songs on Of Someday Shambles, in reference to "Feet Touch The Ground", "Don't really want to say what it's about. The intensity of that song far exceeds anything else we've ever done." Both Kevin and Brett however have revealed in subsequent interviews that the song is about the death of their father in February 1998 and how you deal with the loss of someone you love.

The lyrics in the bridge of the song are most representative of the song's meaning: "Father away, every day. Feels like you're farther away." However, lyricist, Kevin Mitchell, appears to play with the words "father" and "further", as it is unclear which is used at the beginning of the line.

== Track listing ==
All tracks are written by Chris Daymond, Brett Mitchell, Kevin Mitchell and Vanessa Thornton

No.	Title	Length
1.	"Feet Touch the Ground (Single Version)"	5:05
2.	"Look That Way"	3:02
3.	"Work in Progress"	5:17
4.	"Animal" (video)

== Charts ==
Chart (1999)	Peak position
Australia (ARIA)	73
