= New England (band) =

American rock band

- Origin: Boston, Massachusetts, U.S.
- Genres: Arena rock; hard rock; pop rock
- Years active: 1978–1982, 2002, 2005–present
- Labels: Infinity, Elektra
- Members: John Fannon; Hirsh Gardner; Jimmy Waldo; Gary Shea
- Website: newenglandrocks.com

New England is an American rock band, who were best known in the US for their first single, "Don't Ever Wanna Lose Ya", which received heavy radio exposure on Album-oriented rock (AOR) stations and reached No. 40 on the Billboard Hot 100 chart in 1979. The follow-up "Hello, Hello, Hello" also received some airplay. New England described their sound as "power-melodic-orchestrated-song-oriented rock"

== Career ==
John Fannon, Jimmy Waldo, Gary Shea and Hirsh Gardner formed the band in the Boston area. They were discovered by Kiss manager Bill Aucoin. Paul Stanley helped the band record and produce their self-titled debut album, along with producer Mike Stone, known for his work with Queen and Asia among many others. The group went on tour in support of Kiss, but New England slid between the cracks of other Aucoin projects. The group's success stalled when their record label Infinity Records failed and was absorbed by its parent company, MCA Records in 1980.

The group moved to Elektra Records for their second album, Explorer Suite. That album garnered little commercial notice. The title track was released as a single, with management at their label Elektra hoping for interest in an unconventional extended pop song, similar to what they had witnessed a few years earlier for their labelmates Queen with the song "Bohemian Rhapsody". However, the songs "Living In The Eighties" and "Conversation" received more airplay than did the intended single.

Todd Rundgren's production on the new wave-styled third album, Walking Wild, did not improve sales.

After the release of the third album, John Fannon left the group. The remaining three members then began working with Vinnie Vincent, changed the name of the band to Warrior, and recorded a series of demos in 1982. The project dissolved when Vinnie Vincent subsequently joined Kiss later that year. Shortly thereafter, Gary Shea and Jimmy Waldo joined the band Alcatrazz. These demo recordings were eventually released on CD in 2017.

After the break-up, all of the members remained in the music industry. In late 2002, New England reunited to record "More Than You'll Ever Know", a song from the Hirsh Gardner solo album entitled Wasteland For Broken Hearts. It marked the first time the group recorded together in 20 years. In recent years, the band has reunited for a few live shows in the Boston area. Shea and Waldo made guest appearances at various musical instrument conventions such as the NAMM Show in places like Anaheim, California.

The US reissue label Renaissance Records released a CD version of the first album. GB Records released the other two albums on CD, plus a live album and an album of early recording studio/studio sound recordings and reproduction/recordings made before the debut album. In 2009, Wounded Bird Records reissued Explorer Suite and Walking Wild on CD.

In 2017, Hirsh Gardner founded the "Hirsh Gardner Project" and release their debut album titled My Brain Needs a Holiday. In the summer of 2020, The Hirsh Gardner Project broke up

In 2023, Hirsh Gardner was inducted into the New England Music Hall of Fame in Arlington Massachusetts.

== Reunion ==
While occasionally doing single reunion shows for charity, in May 2014 John Fannon discussed New England having new studio work and a possible full tour for 2015 during his solo appearance on the Concert TV series, On Stage with Mantis. A new single was released by the band in April 2015 titled "I Know There's Something Here" along with the b-side being a re-record of "Conversation" a song taken from the band's second album Explorer Suite.

== EuroHouse covers ==
"Get it Up" hit No. 1 on Billboard's Spain charts in July 1995 and remained a top 10 hit into October, thanks to a EuroHouse cover by the group Sensity World. Sensity World was based in Valencia, Spain, with vocalist Aina Martínez Tejedor and producer Víctor Javier Grafia Gavin.

The song was featured in over 70 different EuroHouse releases (the "Ibiza Mix 95" compilation alone sold over 300,000 units in Spain during 1995, as documented by both Promusicae and Billboard magazine.) DJ Sammy remixed a "Maxi" for the German, Belgium, and Holland markets. "Get it Up" had over 8 million views on YouTube as of October, 2022. And Sensity World still was performing this song in concert to large audiences in 2020.

Other groups also made EuroHouse covers. For example, in 2021, Soraya (Arnelas) released an updated version of "Get it Up" featuring Julian Poker in Spain. In the 2010s, Lorena Gomez released several versions of the song, featuring Carlos Gallardo, in Italy, Germany, and Spain.

== Discography ==
Year	Album	Billboard Top 200
1979	New England	50
1980	Explorer Suite	202
1981	Walking Wild	176

=== Singles ===
Date	Title	US
May 1979	"Don't Ever Wanna Lose Ya"	40
September 1979	"Hello, Hello, Hello" / "Encore"	69
1979	"P.U.N.K" / "Shoot"	–
1980	"DDT" / "Elevator"	–
April 2015	"I Know There's Something There"	–

=== Covers - EuroHouse ===
Date	Title	Cover Group	Billboard Spain
1995	"Get It Up"	Sensity World	1

=== Promotional releases ===
- 1979 Live Concert Series (6 cuts) 12" Infinity L33-1023
- 1979 "Don't Ever Wanna Lose Ya" / same (3:28/5:22) 12" Infinity L33-1009
- 1979 "Don't Ever Wanna Lose Ya" / same (3:28/5:22) 7" Infinity INF-50,013
- 1979 "Don't Ever Wanna Lose Ya" / "Shoot" (Picture Disc) issued with various b-side adverts 7" Infinity
- 1979 "Hello Hello Hello" / same (3:20/3:20) 7" Infinity INF-50,021
- 1979 "Hello Hello Hello" (3:20/3:34) 12" Infinity L33-1018
- 1980 "Explorer Suite" (4:25/6:44) 12" Elektra AS-11473
- 1980 "Explorer Suite" (4:25/6:44) 7" Elektra E-47075
- 1980 "Livin' In The Eighties" (3:24) mono/stereo Elektra E-47106
- 1980 "DDT" / same (3:01) mono/stereo Elektra E-47155
- 1980"*Don't Ever Let Me Go" / same (3:41) mono/stereo Elektra E-47205

=== Compilations ===
New England (Self Titled Limited Edition Vinyl) (2020)

=== EuroHouse releases (Sensity World) ===
- 1995 "Get It Up", 12" White Label, Essential Sound Music ESN.003, Spain
- Dozens of others that can be found on music databases

=== Personnel ===
- John Fannon: guitar, vocals
- Jimmy Waldo: keyboards, vocals
- Hirsh Gardner: drums, vocals
- Gary Shea: bass
