= Al Hunter (singer) =

New Zealand singer-songwriter

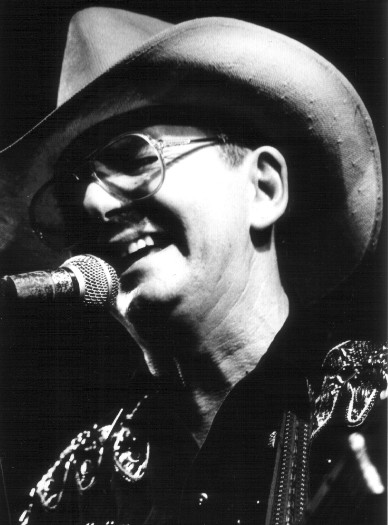
- Al Hunter at the Gluepot, early '90s.

Background information
- Born: Alan Keith Hunter
- Origin: Pukemiro, New Zealand
- Genre: Country
- Occupations: Singer, songwriter
- Instruments: Vocals, guitar
- Years active: 1970s-present
- Website: http://www.glenmoffatt.com/al_hunter.htm

Al Hunter is a New Zealand country music singer-songwriter whose debut album, Neon Cowboy, released in 1987, "made country hip".

Hunter was a soul singer in such Auckland bands of the late 1960s and '70s as Killing Floor, Cruise Lane, Chapeaux and the Hunter McCallum Band before embracing country music.

His debut album was produced by Stuart Pearce and Dave Marett on a budget CBS had provided for a single. It was recorded in Australia at Greystoke Music Studios and included contributions from Dave Dobbyn.

Hunter's following two albums were released by Pagan in the 1990s.

New Zealand rock historian John Dix wrote, "Wellington had the Warratahs; Auckland had the indomitable Al Hunter. In 1993 Pagan released The Singer, cementing Hunter's rep as a genuine country rock talent."

Eight tracks from Hunter's 1997 release Cold Hard Winter reappeared on the compilation album Troubadours – NZ Singer-Songwriter Series: Vol 1, which also featured eight tracks each from Glen Moffatt and Red McKelvie.

== Discography ==
Albums
Date of release	Title	Label	Charted	Certification	Catalog Number
1987	Neon Cowboy	CBS/Pagan (reissue)	–	–	PACD 1098 435 7982
1993	The Singer	Pagan	–	–	PACD 1094 / 4357942
1997	Cold Hard Winter	Pagan	–	–	PACD 1135 (8444822)
2009	Troubadours – NZ Singer-Songwriter Series: Vol 1 – Glen Moffatt, Al Hunter, Red McKelvie	SDL Music	–	–	SDL8044/2
