= Donald Dempsey =

American recording executive

Donald Dempsey (right) with songwriter Joseph Rigatuso

Donald A. Dempsey Sr. (11 June 1932 – 27 January 2005) was an American recording executive who helped launch Ozzy Osbourne and Merle Haggard.

He would often visit his brother and sister-in-law in Connecticut, Norman Dempsey Sr and Dorothy Shepherd Dempsey, and would have to be reminded more than once to join them for dinner in the dining room which adjoined the music room. Donald could be seen completely enveloped in listening to music, even conducting with his hands, eyes closed. His passion and love for music ran deep. Some of his vinyl records from the 60's and 70's are still within a family collection.

A one-time math teacher, Dempsey and his aforementioned brother also played baseball in the minor leagues together before he began his music career peddling albums for a distributor to dime and discount department stores that would eventually embark on a 25-year career with CBS Records. Dempsey became general manager in 1978 of Epic Portrait Associated (Epic Records, Portrait Records and CBS Associated Labels Group) succeeding Ronald Alexenburg who would leave CBS to head up Infinity Records. When the music industry went into a tailspin in the mid-1980s, Dempsey was removed from his post in 1986 and retired shortly afterwards.

In his role as general manager of Epic Portrait Associated, he worked with The Clash, Culture Club, The Isley Brothers, George Jones, Quiet Riot, Ricky Skaggs and Luther Vandross. His career high is seen to be the aggressive marketing of Michael Jackson's 1982 album Thriller, which sold over 40 million copies.

He was asked in 2002 what he thought of Michael Jackson's eccentricities to which he responded, "they overshadowed his talent."

He died in January 2005 following a stroke at his home in Kissimmee, Florida.
