= Ritchie Pickett =

New Zealand singer-songwriter (1955–2011)

- Ritchie Pickett at the King's Arms, 2003.

Background information
- Born: 16 February 1955
- Origin: Morrinsville, New Zealand
- Died: 13 March 2011 (aged 56)
- Genre: Country
- Occupations: Singer, songwriter
- Instruments: Vocals, piano, guitar
- Years active: 1970s–2011
- Website: Ritchie Pickett's Pasifikan funktry

Ritchie Pickett (16 February 1955 – 13 March 2011) was a New Zealand country music singer-songwriter.

== Early life ==
Ritchie Pickett was born in Morrinsville, in the Waikato region, on 16 February 1955.

== Career ==
Pickett has been described as one of New Zealand's "kings of country/rock".

He began playing in rock 'n' roll bands such as Graffiti, which toured New Zealand with singer Tom Sharplin in the mid-1970s, before joining heavy metal/prog rock band Think, with whom he recorded an album.

Think relocated to Sydney, where they broke up and Pickett formed his own band called Snuff. In 1981, Pickett was transported back to Waikato Hospital in New Zealand.

In the early 1980s, he formed country music band Ritchie Pickett & the Inlaws which toured New Zealand relentlessly and released an acclaimed LP, but disbanded in 1985. He was also a regular performer on the high-rating primetime television show That's Country.

Pickett fronted several Waikato bands through the late 1980s and early 1990s, including the Jones Boys, the Fat Band, Stingray Martini's Excellent Duckbeast (featuring Tim Armstrong) and the Disturbance, before working mainly under his own name.

In a newspaper article detailing Bay of Plenty music of the late 1980s it was reported, "Ruling the roost at the time – or at least Tauranga's most well-known performer thanks to a stint on TV and a major label album (LP of course) – was Ritchie Pickett, with his band the Jones Boys, featuring bassist/singer Chris Gunn."

Pickett finally released his debut solo album in 1998. As New Zealand rock historian John Dix wrote of local country music of the time, "It wasn't all alt. rock, hip hop and hard rock in the '90s. Country rock survived with recording acts like the Coalrangers (from the wild West Coast), Glen Moffatt, Ritchie Pickett, The Renderers and the Waltons. The most successful were the Warratahs, signed to Pagan."

In 2004, Pickett released a live album featuring his contributions from a New Zealand tour with fellow New Zealand songwriter Glen Moffatt and Australian roots songwriter Bill Chambers, father of Kasey Chambers. Five years later he was part of the band The Rattler, also featuring former members of Knightshade and the Furys, which released The Leaving.

== Death ==
Pickett died on 13 March 2011 at the age of 56.

== Discography ==
Albums
Date of release	Title	Label	Charted	Certification	Catalog Number
1976	We'll Give You A Buzz – Think	Atlantic	–	–	Z 2001
1984	Gone For Water – Ritchie Pickett & the Inlaws	RCA	–	–	VPL1 0476
1998	All Strung Out in a Bunch	Boatshed	–	–	BSRCD007
2004	The Wicked Piano Pumpin' Pickett	Barking Records	–	–	BRCD Woof 005
2009	The Leaving – The Rattler	GunJumper Records	–	–	–
2011	White Horses	Rajon Music Group	–	–	RRCD51
