= N.D.C. (song) =

Single by Jebediah

from the album Jebediah
- Released: 1 July 2002
- Recorded: July–August 2001
- Genre: Alternative rock
- Length: 3:07
- Label: Redline Records
- Songwriter(s): Chris Daymond, Brett Mitchell, Kevin Mitchell and Vanessa Thornton
- Producer(s): Magoo

Jebediah singles chronology
"Nothing Lasts Forever" (2002)	"N.D.C." (2002)	"First Time" (2004)

"N.D.C." is a song by Australian alternative rock band Jebediah. It was released in July 2002 as the third and final single from the band's self-titled album, Jebediah. The track was co-written by the group's members, Chris Daymond (lead guitar), Brett Mitchell (drums, backing vocals), his brother Kevin Mitchell (lead vocals, rhythm guitar) and Vanessa Thornton (bass guitar). It was released in July 2002 and peaked at number 92 on the ARIA Singles Chart.

== Song meaning ==
During an interview following a live performance at Fox Studios in Sydney, Australia, the band revealed that the song title is ambiguous, and could be a pun on the phrase, "indie scene", or an acronym for "No Definite Conclusion".

== Track listing ==
No.	Title	Length
1.	"N.D.C."
2.	"Closing Time"
3.	"Best of Times, Worst of Times"
4.	"Nothing Lasts Forever (acoustic version)"

== Charts ==
Chart (2002)	Peak position
Australia (ARIA)	92
