= The Flying Circus (band) =

Australian band

- Origin: Sydney, New South Wales, Australia
- Genres: Pop; country rock
- Years active: 1968–1975
- Labels: EMI/Columbia; EMI/Harvest; Warner; Capitol
- Past members: Bob Hughes; Doug Rowe; Colin Walker; James Wynne; Warren Ward; Greg Grace; Terry Wilkins; Red McKelvie; Sam See

The Flying Circus were an Australian pop and country rock band with founding mainstays, Doug Rowe on lead guitar and vocals and Colin Walker on drums. They had three top 30 pop hits, "Hayride", "La La" and "Run Run Run", in Australia from 1968 to 1971. These were not typical of their live work nor later recordings. They re-located to Canada from 1971 to 1974 where they achieved chart success with "Old Enough (to Break My Heart)" and "Maple Lady" (both 1972). Doug Rowe died in July 2015.

== 1968: Beginnings ==
The Flying Circus were formed in August 1968 in Sydney as a country, folk-rock band with Bob Hughes on bass guitar and vocals, Doug Rowe on guitar and vocals (ex-New Zealand group, Castaways), James Wynne on vocals and guitar and Colin Walker on drums. They performed "harmony-rich covers of Byrds, Dylan and Dillards country songs." Like the Byrds, a prominent part of their early sound came from the use of a 12-string Rickenbacker guitar. Hughes left the band in early 1969; he was replaced by bassist Warren Ward, while the group added Greg Grace on vocals and harmonica.

Hughes later became an actor and appeared in a musical documentary film, ABBA: The Movie (1977), and had the lead role on the TV sitcom, Hey Dad..! (1987–1994). In 2014, Hughes was convicted of sexual offences against children while on the set of Hey Dad...! and was sentenced to 10 years and 9 months imprisonment.

== 1969: "Hayride" and "La La" to The Flying Circus ==
The Flying Circus signed to EMI Records/Columbia Graphophone Company in late 1968 and appeared at an outdoor concert in Sydney's Domain on Australia Day 1969. The original line-up recorded a cover version of "Shame Shame", but it was not released at that time. Their first chart success occurred with their debut single, a cover of American songwriters, Buzz Cason and Mac Gayden's song, "Hayride" (February 1969), which peaked at No. 23 on the Go-Set National Top 40. The song has a Chipmunks sounding intro, which resulted in the band being branded with a bubblegum pop tag, although their stage performances and later recordings were in the country rock vein.

Notwithstanding its trite nature, "Hayride", was initially banned in New Zealand due to a suggestive lyric, "making love in the hay." A promotional film-clip was broadcast on national TV pop show, Uptight!. Their second single, another Cason-Gayden song, "La La" (May 1969), reached No. 9. It was a more sophisticated performance, but still reinforced their image as a bubblegum band. The group recorded their self-titled debut album in May, produced by Mike Perjanik and released in that year. According to Australian musicologist, Ian McFarlane, "[it] was an odd collection of the pop hits, Byrds' covers, an ill-conceived medley of songs from the rock musical Hair and a couple of Rowe's country-rock tunes."

Greg Grace left in June 1969 to form Hot Cottage; Warren Ward left in September, to form Stonehenge and he joined Blackfeather in 1971 and performed on their hit single, "Boppin' the Blues" (July 1972). Ward was replaced on bass guitar by Terry Wilkins (ex-Starving Wild Dogs, Quill). "Run Run Run", issued in December 1969, was their last bubblegum pop hit, which peaked at No. 19. It sounded much like the first two Cason-Gayden hits although it was written by Rowe.

== 1970–1971: Prepared in Peace and line-up changes ==
The Flying Circus released their first extended play, Frontier, in April 1970. Its four tracks were produced by Perjanik, again. McFarlane described how it, "featured all country songs, including covers of Dylan's 'I'll Be Your Baby Tonight' and Merle Haggard's 'The Day the Rains Came'." The band had returned to their country-rock roots; it included Rowe's "I Remember Jo-Anne" and Wilkins' "When Will I See You As You". Also in April they added a fifth member, lead guitarist and pedal steel player, Bertram "Red" McKelvie, (ex-Starving Wild Dogs, Quill). McKelvie's arrival steered the group towards straight-ahead country music.

Further change was evident on their second album, Prepared in Peace, which was released in July 1970 and comprised 12 original tracks in folk and country styles and only one cover version. It was critically well received and eventually peaked at No. 20 on the Go-Set Top 20 Albums chart in October. Lack of early chart success was partly due to the effects of the 1970 radio ban, a "pay-for-play" dispute between Australian commercial radio and record labels, which had singles from EMI (and other major labels) banned from commercial radio between May and October 1970. In July that year the band scored a victory over teen favourites, Zoot, in the national final of the Hoadley's Battle of the Sounds competition. Their prize included a free airline trip to Los Angeles. However, the situation, "succeeded in ending the band's chances for wider mainstream acceptance."

In October 1970 the Flying Circus released a single, "Israel", written by McKelvie from the album. Red McKelvie departed the band in that month. He went on to form country-rock groups, Powderhorn and Third Union Band, and later played in Richard Clapton's backing band – McKelvie provided slide guitar on that artist's hit single, "Girls on the Avenue" (January 1975). McKelvie's departure resulted in a more rock music-influenced, but still country-tinged, style. This was emphasised by adding a keyboard and guitar player, Sam See (ex-Sherbet). Their third album, Bonza, Beaut & Boom Boom Boom (1971) on EMI Records/Harvest Records, was "a straight-ahead rock LP." Two singles, "Turn Away" (February 1971) and "It Couldn't Happen Here" (April), were released, but they did not chart. The band had a penchant for writing and recording songs about steam trains, with titles such as "Kempsey Mail", "3667", and "The Last Train", mainly due to the presence of James Wynne, a lifelong train enthusiast who later became an artist noted for his paintings of steam trains.

== 1971–1973: Canada, "Old Enough" and "Maple Lady" ==
The Flying Circus used their Hoadley's prize to travel to San Francisco, United States in mid-1971 and then re-located to Toronto, Canada. They were signed to Capitol Records. McFarlane observed, they had become, "disillusioned with the lack of acceptance on home turf", which motivated the move. Lead singer, James Wynne left the band. They gained a deal from Toronto music agency, Music Factory, for a $10,000, which sponsored a two-month tour. A single, "Turn Away", was released in the US but to no chart success.

In July 1971, they visited Australia where they released their next single, "The Ballad of Sacred Falls" (September), which was a Crosby, Stills & Nash-influenced track. Back in Canada, in late 1971, they toured Canada for most of 1972, "where audiences were more receptive." During the brief time in Australia, in September 1971, Sam See had left to join progressive rock group, Fraternity (alongside Bon Scott as lead singer), and Greg Grace rejoined as his replacement. The Flying Circus became part of the Toronto rock music scene. After scoring a reputed million-dollar contract with Capitol Records, they recorded their next album, Gypsy Road, via Warner Music Group, which McFarlane felt, "delivered everything the past years had promised." The single, "Old Enough (To Break My Heart)", reached No. 19 on the Canadian charts and its follow-up, "Maple Lady" (October 1972), peaked at No. 58 on the RPM 100 Top Singles, and made the lower end of the US Billboard Hot 100.

The Flying Circus returned to Australia for the second Sunbury Pop Festival in January 1973, where, "the lukewarm reception did little to bolster the band's regard for local audiences." In Canada, Sam See rejoined after leaving Fraternity, while in England. Greg Grace left the band again, later becoming the roadie for Canadian band Wireless, which included three ex-members of Australian band, Autumn. Grace continued his music career as a sound and stage technician for Canadian rock band, Glass Tiger.

== 1974: The Last Laugh to disbandment ==
The Flying Circus released another rock-based album, Last Laugh, in 1974. The line-up was Rowe, See, Walker and Wilkins. However, by the end of 1974 the group disbanded. Sam See and Terry Wilkins toured and recorded as members of Canadian band, Lighthouse. Doug Rowe remained in Toronto, where he set up his own studio, and he later returned to Australia. In 1982 he joined a country-rock band, Grand Junction, which won a Golden Guitar at the Tamworth Country Music Festival for "Married Women", although the track was recorded using Peter Johnson on vocals, who had left the band prior to the win.

Douglas John Rowe died on 23 July 2015, aged 69. McFarlane reviewed Gypsy Road in October 2015 and reflected on Rowe and the group, "he was a very under-appreciated talent in Australia. Between 1968 and 1974 his band Flying Circus issued a series of finely crafted albums that mixed elements of folk rock, country rock and mainstream rock into a very listenable whole. As well as the jangly guitars and country textures, the band's wonderful harmonies added the extra texture that helped to distinguish the music from the sounds so prevalent here at the time: progressive rock, boogie rock, heavy blues and glam rock."

== Discography ==
=== Studio albums ===
- The Flying Circus (1969) – EMI Records/Columbia Graphophone Company (SCXO 7907)
- Prepared in Peace (1970) – EMI Records/Columbia Graphophone Company (SCXO 7925) AUS: No. 20
- Bonza Beaut & Boom Boom Boom (1971) – EMI Records/Harvest Records (SHVL604) AUS: No.40
- Gypsy Road (1972) – Warner Music Group (WS-20010)
- Last Laugh (1974) – Warner Music Group (WS-20020)

=== Compilation albums ===
- Steam Trains & Country Lanes (An Anthology) (1977) – EMI Records (EMA-326)
- Best of Flying Circus 1969–71 (1995) – EMI Records (814170)

=== Extended plays ===
- Frontier (April 1970) – EMI Records/Columbia Graphophone Company (SEGO-70187)

=== Singles ===
- "Hayride" (1969) – EMI Records/Columbia Graphophone Company AUS: No. 23
- "La La" (1969) – EMI Records/Columbia Graphophone Company AUS: No. 9
- "Run Run Run" (1969) – EMI Records/Columbia Graphophone Company AUS: No. 19
- "Israel"(1970)
- "Giselle" (1971) AUS: No.99
- "Turn Away" (1971) AUS: No.93
- "It Couldn't Happen Here" (1971)
- "Finding My Way" (1971)
- "Old Enough (To Break My Heart)" (1972) – CHUM Chart: No. 19
- "Maple Lady" (1972) – CAN: No. 58
- "Jabber Jabber" (1974)

== Awards and nominations ==
=== Go-Set Pop Poll ===
The Go-Set Pop Poll was coordinated by teen-oriented pop music newspaper, Go-Set and was established in February 1966 and conducted an annual poll during 1966 to 1972 of its readers to determine the most popular personalities.

Year	Nominee / work	Award	Result
1969	themselves	Best Australian Group	5th
