= Main Street Jive =

Studio album by Richard Clapton
- Released: August 1976
- Genre: Rock
- Length: 35.42
- Label: Infinity Records, Festival Records
- Producer: Richard Batchens

Richard Clapton chronology
Girls on the Avenue (1975)	Main Street Jive (1976)	Goodbye Tiger (1977)

Singles from Main Street Jive
- 1. "Suit Yourself" Released: 1976

Main Street Jive is the third studio album by Australian musician Richard Clapton, released in August 1976. It reached number 64 on the Kent Music Report. The album was produced by Richard Batchens. "Suit Yourself" was released as a single.

== Track listing ==
Side A
No.	Title	Writer(s)	Length
1.	"Soldier of Fortune"	Richard Clapton	5:28
2.	"Suit Yourself"	Richard Clapton	3:38
3.	"Kickin' The Moon Around"	Richard Clapton	4:02
4.	"Lonesome Heart"	Richard Clapton	4:16

Side B
No.	Title	Writer(s)	Length
1.	"Need a Visionary"	Richard Clapton	3:40
2.	"Factory Life"	Richard Clapton	4:05
3.	"Casanova's Got The Blues"	Richard Clapton	5:55
4.	"Islands of the Heart"	Richard Clapton	5:58
Total length:			35:42

== Charts ==
Chart (1976)	Peak position
Australian Albums (Kent Music Report)	64

== Release history ==
Country	Date	Label	Format	Catalog
Australia	August 1976	Infinity Records	LP	L 35963
Australia	1992	Infinity Records	CD / Cassette	C19583, D19583
