= Of Someday Shambles =

Studio album by Jebediah
- Released: 3 October 1999
- Recorded: April–June 1999
- Genres: Alternative rock; pop punk; emo pop
- Length: 54:50
- Label: Murmur
- Producer: Mark Trombino

Jebediah chronology
Slightly Odway (1997)	Of Someday Shambles (1999)	Jebediah (2002)

Singles from Of Someday Shambles
- 1. "Animal" Released: 9 August 1999; 2. "Feet Touch the Ground" Released: 27 November 1999; 3. "Please Leave" Released: 13 March 2000

Alternative cover
- US release

Of Someday Shambles is the second studio album by Australian alternative rock band Jebediah. It was recorded between April and June 1999 and was produced by Mark Trombino. It was released on 3 October 1999 by record label Murmur.

It peaked at No. 2 on the ARIA Albums Chart and, by December of the following year, it received a Platinum certification from ARIA.

== Recording ==
Of Someday Shambles was recorded from April to June 1999 by Jebediah with American producer Mark Trombino (Knapsack, Jimmy Eat World, Blink 182). The group's line-up was Chris Daymond on lead guitar, Kevin Mitchell on lead vocals and rhythm guitar, Vanessa Thornton on bass guitar and Kevin's older brother Brett Mitchell on drums. On the choice of Trombino as producer, Kevin explained:

We chose him because he'd done the last two records by Knapsack... they're kinda like a discordant punk band, this weird indie rock pop punk crossover. We mainly made the decision because of the direction we could see the songs going. They were still pop songs like Odway but they were getting more complicated, not as straightforward; they had a bit more depth to them.

Working with Trombino had Brett Mitchell "record with a metronomic click track" for his drum parts. Daymond recalled that Brett would "keep going, but there would be longer pauses between him being asked, 'Are you OK?' and him replying, 'I'm all right' ... The pauses would get longer and longer. Then eventually he'd go, 'I need a cigarette'."

== Release ==
"Animal" was the lead single from the album and was released on 9 August 1999. It reached number 16 on the ARIA Singles Charts, which was promoted by an Australian tour supported by New Zealand indie rock band Garageland.

Of Someday Shambles was released on 3 October 1999 by Murmur. Initial pressings of the album included a bonus CD-ROM that contained the band's first five music videos, some footage from the recording of the album, lyrics, photos and web links. The album peaked at number two on the ARIA Albums Chart and remained in the top 50 for 25 weeks. By December 2000 Of Someday Shambles had received a platinum certificate from ARIA.

The second single released was "Feet Touch the Ground", which was released on 22 November 1999 and peaked at number 75. The next single, "Please Leave", was released on 13 March 2000 in two versions: a brown version and a blue version. It peaked at number 53.

Additionally, "Star Machine", was released in 2000 as a promotional single only. It received airplay on community radio stations and national youth radio's Triple J. The song was used on the soundtrack for season one of the Australian TV drama series McLeod's Daughters.

== Reception ==
Professional ratings
Review scores
Source	Rating
AllMusic	2.5/5 stars
Jam!	(positive)
Modern Fix	(mixed)
PopMatters	(positive)

Australian musicologist Ian McFarlane described Of Someday Shambles as "brimming with youthful exuberance and feisty, melodic, guitar-based fuzzy punk-pop perfectly suited to the post-grunge alternative generation. It was a more adventurous, varied and assured album in some ways, without the band members getting too clever and too far removed from what they do best." Greg Lawrence at WHAMMO.com.au noted that it "delivers on the promise of Slightly Odway, ... [this] effort has the four-piece sporting tonnes more light and shade than their first effort and stretching out in the studio."

Ken Taylor of AllMusic rated the album at two-and-a-half stars out of five and felt it "makes noisy emo-pop that, for the most part, indulges the sweet tooth of younger kids still aiming to assert some type of aggression. The songwriting, though not the strongest suit for these four youngsters, comes across as sophomoric but isn't entirely bad, as some of the changes take unpredictable twists and turns. The biggest problem that Jebediah faces is that they occasionally fall prey to certain Green Dayisms. Structurally, they strike a chord and a drum, and the three beats in between are given to the guitarist to illustrate his rather tepid chops. The nasally vocals are also damagingly pedestrian and taste rather stale at this point." PopMatters' Jeremy Hart noticed the influence of Jimmy Eat World on this album, but felt that on Of Someday Shambles Jebediah "brings the worlds of indie-rock and pop closer together than most bands can ever hope to".

== Track listing ==
All tracks are written by Chris Daymond, Brett Mitchell, Kevin Mitchell and Vanessa Thornton

No.	Title	Length
0.	"Big Beer Wall" (pregap track, only present on the Australian release)	2:50
1.	"Did You Really?"	3:10
2.	"Star Machine"	4:43
3.	"Congratulations"	4:19
4.	"Trapdoor"	2:09
5.	"Please Leave"	3:36
6.	"Love at Last"	5:10
7.	"Animal"	4:28
8.	"Happier Sad"	6:51
9.	"Slot Car Racing" (aka "Fast")	1:42
10.	"Feet Touch the Ground"	5:04
11.	"In Orbit"	4:31
12.	"Skin"	3:51
13.	"Run of the Company"	6:57
Total length:		59:21

American version bonus tracks
No.	Title	Length
14.	"Look That Way"	3:00
15.	"Jerks of Attention"	4:16

== Personnel ==
Jebediah

- Chris Daymond – guitar
- Brett Mitchell – drums
- Kevin Mitchell – vocals
- Vanessa Thornton – bass guitar

Additional musicians

- Ed Bates – pedal steel guitar on "Happier Sad"
- Victorian Philharmonic Orchestra – orchestral instruments on "Run of the Company"
- Cezary Skubiszewski – orchestral arrangements on "Run of the Company"

Technical personnel

- Mark Trombino – production, mixing, engineering
- Andrew Christie – cover artwork
- Ben Steele – cover artwork
- Ross Cockle – recording assistance on "Run of the Company"
- Dave Davis – engineering assistance
- Matt Dufty – engineering assistance
- Brian Gardner – mastering
- Reg Sargeant – cover photography
- Carla Steele – sleeve photography

== Charts ==
=== Weekly charts ===
Chart (1999/2000)	Peak position
Australian Albums (ARIA)	2

=== Year-end charts ===
Year (1999)	Position
Australian Albums (ARIA)	70

== Release history ==
Region	Date	Format	Label	Catalogue	Ref.
Australia	1 November 1999	CD	Murmur	MATTCD092	
Australia	1 November 1999	Cassette	Murmur	MATTC092	
Australia	1 November 1999	Vinyl	Murmur	MATTV092	
United States	3 October 2000	CD	Big Wheel Recreation	BWR 0233	
Australia	13 April 2019	Vinyl	Murmur	19075937221	
Worldwide	19 December 2019	Digital download	Sony Music	G0100042212701	
Australia	10 October 2025	Vinyl	Murmur, Sony Music	19802918861	
