= Glen Moffatt =

New Zealand singer-songwriter (born 1971)

- Glen Moffatt at the Norfolk Island Festival, 1997.

Background information
- Born: Glen Stephen Moffatt; 20 January 1971 (age 55)
- Origin: Napier, New Zealand
- Genre: Country
- Occupations: Singer, songwriter
- Instruments: Vocals, guitar
- Years active: 1992–present
- Website: http://www.glenmoffatt.com

Glen Stephen Moffatt is a New Zealand country music singer-songwriter who relocated to Brisbane, Australia, in 2002.

== Early life ==
Glen Stephen Moffatt was born in Hastings and raised in Napier.

Moffatt was a newspaper journalist before moving to Auckland at the end of 1991.

== Music career ==
New Zealand music historian John Dix wrote of New Zealand music in the 1990s, "It wasn't all alt. rock, hip hop and hard rock in the '90s. Country rock survived with recording acts like the Coalrangers (from the wild West Coast), Glen Moffatt, Ritchie Pickett, the Renderers and the Waltons. The most successful were the Warratahs, signed to Pagan."

Moffatt's 1995 debut album Somewhere in New Zealand Tonight was described by New Zealand Herald music critic Graham Reid as the "birth of a Kiwi classic". It was a finalist in country album of the year at the 1996 New Zealand recording industry awards. Moffatt was also a finalist in the rising star and songwriter of the year categories.

In 1998 he released follow-up A Place to Play, of which Reid wrote, "Moffatt has written his name large again and is, after two strong showings, a talent too big to ignore". In 2001, as Glen Moffatt Band, came his final New Zealand album If That's What You Want.

Moffatt moved to Queensland in 2002, forming a band called Glen Moffatt & the Tallboys, and in 2007 he began working with long-time Brisbane band The Smokin' Crawdads. He sang six tracks on the Smokin' Crawdads album Straight to the Pool Room, which featured Sydney violinist Ian Cooper and was launched at the 2010 Tamworth country music festival.

SDL Music (Scoop de Loop) released the compilation Troubadours – NZ Singer-Songwriter Series: Vol 1 in 2009 containing eight songs each from Moffatt, Al Hunter and Red McKelvie.

Recorded in New Zealand and Australia over 18 months, Moffatt's Superheroes & Scary Things album was released in July 2014. During the same month, Sony Music NZ included his song "Somewhere in New Zealand Tonight" on their Godzone Country: The Very Best of New Zealand Country Music CD release.

Moffatt's songs have appeared on albums by Bill Chambers, Ritchie Pickett, and Dennis Marsh.

== Discography ==
Albums
Date of release	Title	Label	Charted	Certification	Catalog Number
1995	Somewhere in New Zealand Tonight	Sun Pacific	–	–	SP007
1998	A Place to Play	Scoop de Loop	–	–	SCD8038
2001	If That's What You Want	Scoop de Loop	–	–	SCD8040
2009	Troubadours – NZ Singer-Songwriter Series: Vol 1 – Glen Moffatt, Al Hunter, Red McKelvie	SDL Music	–	–	SDL8044/2
2010	Straight to the Pool Room – The Smokin' Crawdads with Ian Cooper	–	–	–	–
2014	Superheroes & Scary Things	SDL Music	–	–	SCD9073
