= First Time (Jebediah song) =

Single by Jebediah

from the album Braxton Hicks
- Released: 24 May 2004
- Recorded: January 2004
- Genre: Alternative rock; alternative pop; indie rock
- Length: 16:29
- Label: Redline Records
- Songwriters: Chris Daymond, Kevin Mitchell, Brett Mitchell, Vanessa Thornton
- Producer: Jebediah

Jebediah singles chronology
| "N.D.C." (2002) | "First Time" (2004) | "No Sleep" (2004) |

"First Time" is a song by Australian alternative rock band Jebediah. It was released in May 2004 as the lead single from the band's fourth studio album, Braxton Hicks and reached number 50 on the Australian ARIA Singles Charts.

== Redline Records ==
The single was the first release following the band's departure from the Murmur label (a subsidiary of Sony Music), and was the first independently released Jebediah recording.

== Music video ==
The music video for the single was filmed in Melbourne, Australia, and features all four band members alongside performers in large animal costumes.

== Additional tracks ==
The additional track on the CD single, "Worlds Away", became the theme song for the television series, Lockie Leonard.

== Track listing ==
1. "First Time"
2. "Worlds Away" (Matt Lovell Mix)
3. "Sound of Your Life"
4. "Dog"

== Charts ==
| Chart (2004) | Peak position |
|---|---|
| Australia (ARIA) | 50 |
