= The Great Escape (Richard Clapton album) =

Studio album by Richard Clapton
- Released: February 1982
- Studio: Paradise Studios, Melbourne
- Label: WEA
- Producer: Mark Opitz

Richard Clapton chronology
Dark Spaces (1980)	The Great Escape (1982)	The Very Best of Richard Clapton (1982)

Singles from The Great Escape
- 1. "I Am an Island" Released: February 1982; 2. "Spellbound" Released: May 1982; 3. "The Best Years of Our Lives" Released: September 1982

The Great Escape is the seventh studio album by the Australian rock music singer-songwriter, Richard Clapton released in February 1982.

== Background and release ==
From 1973 to 1980, Clapton released six studio albums with Infinity /Festival before signing with WEA before the release of The Great Escape. The music journalist Ian McFarland called it "one of his strongest albums".

== Track listing ==
All tracks are written by Richard Clapton (except where noted)

Side A
No.	Title	Length
1.	"I Am an Island"	5:02
2.	"The Universal"	4:36
3.	"Spellbound"	4:35
4.	"Flow in Motion"	4:24
5.	"The Best Years of Our Lives"	5:08

Side B
No.	Title	Writer(s)	Length
1.	"Syncopation Train"		4:36
2.	"I Fought the Law"	Sonny Curtis	2:43
3.	"All Night Long"		3:40
4.	"Walk On Water"		4:33

== Charts ==
Chart (1982)	Peak position
Australian Albums (Kent Music Report)	8

== Release history ==
Country	Date	Label	Format	Catalog
Australia	February 1982	WEA	LP	600106
Australia		WEA	CD, cassette	61228-4
Australia	16 August 2024	Warner Music Australia	CD / LP / digital	2173225825
