= Hearts on the Nightline =

Studio album by Richard Clapton
- Released: April 1979
- Recorded: 1978
- Studio: Sandcastle Recording Studios, Chateau Studios, Los Angeles
- Label: Interfusion /Festival
- Producer: Dallas Smith

Richard Clapton chronology
Past Hits and Previews (1978)	Hearts on the Nightline (1979)	Dark Spaces (1980)

Singles from Hearts on the Nightline
- 1. "Hearts on the Nightline" Released: April 1979; 2. "Ace of Hearts" Released: June 1979

Hearts on the Nightline is the fifth studio album by Australian rock music singer-songwriter Richard Clapton. It was recorded in the USA, produced by Dallas Smith and released in Australia in April 1979. It peaked at No. 17 on the Kent Music Report Albums Chart.

== Track listing ==
All tracks are written by Richard Clapton

Side A
No.	Title	Length
1.	"Hearts On the Nightline"	4:15
2.	"Passing Trains"	6:30
3.	"Ace of Hearts"	6:55
4.	"Down the Tracks"	4:35

Side B
No.	Title	Length
1.	"Sometimes the Fire"	7:23
2.	"Mainstreet Hustle"	3:10
3.	"Out On the Island"	3:40
4.	"Throw Me Down a Line"	3:21
5.	"Thorn in My Saddle"	4:26

== Charts ==
Chart (1979)	Peak position
Australian Albums (Kent Music Report)	17

== Release history ==
Country	Date	Label	Format	Catalog
Australia	April 1979	Infinity Records	LP	L 36932
Australia	1992	Infinity Records	CD	D19586
