= No Sleep (Jebediah song) =

Single by Jebediah

from the album Braxton Hicks
- Released: 1 August 2004
- Recorded: January–February 2004; Kingdom Studios, Perth
- Genre: Alternative rock; Alternative pop; Indie rock
- Length: 3:04
- Label: Redline Records
- Songwriters: Chris Daymond; Kevin Mitchell; Brett Mitchell; Vanessa Thornton
- Producer: Jebediah

Jebediah singles chronology
"First Time" (2004)	"No Sleep" (2004)	"Lost My Nerve" (2010)

"No Sleep" is a song by Australian alternative rock band, Jebediah. The song was released in August 2004 as the second and final single from the band's fourth studio album, Braxton Hicks.

== Radio airplay ==
During August, "No Sleep", became the second most played alternative single on Australian radio, with the video receiving airplay on Rage, Video Hits, VH1 and MTV Australia.

== Music video ==
The music video for the song features the band on the rooftop of a building in Sydney, Australia. The performance of the song occurs over the course of an entire evening until sunrise.

== Compilation albums ==
It is featured on the 2006 WAMi dual disc compilation, Kiss My WAMi 2006, with the audio on the CD album and its video on the DVD.

== Track listing ==
No.	Title	Writer(s)	Length
1.	"No Sleep" (radio edit)	C. Daymond, K. Mitchell, B. Mitchell, V. Thornton	3:40
