= Goodbye Tiger =

Studio album by Richard Clapton
- Released: October 1977
- Recorded: 1977
- Studio: Festival Studios, Sydney
- Genre: Rock
- Length: 38:33
- Label: Infinity/Festival
- Producer: Richard Batchens

Richard Clapton chronology
Main Street Jive (1976)	Goodbye Tiger (1977)	Past Hits and Previews (1978)

Singles from Goodbye Tiger
- 1. "Deep Water" Released: September 1977; 2. "(Down in the) Lucky Country" Released: January 1978

Goodbye Tiger is the fourth studio album by Australian rock music singer-songwriter, Richard Clapton. It was released in October 1977 via Infinity Records/Festival Records and was produced by Richard Batchens. It peaked at No. 11 on the Kent Music Report Albums Chart.

It was the final studio album he recorded for Infinity Records and the last produced by Batchens.

In October 2010 it was listed at No. 15 in the book, 100 Best Australian Albums.

== Background ==
Australian singer-songwriter-guitarist, Richard Clapton, started writing tracks for his fourth studio album after he and a group of friends were at Sydney Town Hall to see American journalist, Hunter S. Thompson, in October 1976. Clapton was referred to as "Tiger" by "[his] 'beat poet' buddies." They got drunk and the binge continued until he got on a flight to Germany before crashing out at a friend's place in Frankfurt.

He wrote the title track at that friend's apartment and later recalled, "It was the only time I've ever written a song and then not gone back and changed a word. It seemed like it had been the end of our innocence or something." He was later snowed in at a resort in Denmark, where there was a blizzard and they were trapped, "but we had enough beer so it didn't really matter." It was there that he wrote most of Goodbye Tiger,

Clapton's backing band for the album was: Gunther Gorman on guitar, Michael Hegerty on bass guitar (ex-Stars), Kirk Lorange on lead guitar, Diane McLennan on backing vocals, Cleis Pearce on viola (ex-MacKenzie Theory) and Greg Sheehan on drums (ex-Blackfeather, MacKenzie Theory). Additional musicians on some tracks included Tony Ansell on keyboards, Tony Buchanan on saxophone and Jim Penson on drums. Clapton has said that working on the album was the worst year of his life, "but I guess that's the record I will always be remembered for." During 1978 he toured nationally in support of its release with Ansell, Hegerty, Lorange, McLennan and Sheehan.

== Reception ==
Australian musicologist, Ian McFarlane, described Goodbye Tiger as, "his most celebrated work, an album full of rich, melodic and accessible rock with a distinctly Australian flavour. It established Clapton's reputation as one of the most important Australian songwriters of the 1970s." Australian rock music historian, Chris Spencer, explained why it is one of his favourites, "[It] represents one of the pinnacles of Australian rock music. Clapton, essentially a singer-songwriter, working within the security of numerous band line-ups, wrote his best lyrics on this album. He never reached the same heights again, particularly with his melodies, visions and observations of urban Australia."

In October 2010 it was listed at No. 15 in the book, 100 Best Australian Albums. The writers and music journalists, Toby Creswell, Craig Mathieson and John O'Donnell, described how, "Strangely, all the songs were about Australia..." despite being written while he was in Europe. They noticed that Clapton's work with Batchens, "was fraught with suspicion and hostility." While "The overriding mood of the album is edgy; like a hangover... All of the songs amplify the themes of the key songs 'Deep Water', 'Down in the Lucky Country' and the title song."

== Track listing ==
All tracks are written by Richard Clapton.

Side A
No.	Title	Length
1.	"Down in the Lucky Country"	3:42
2.	"Wild Child"	3:32
3.	"Goodbye Tiger"	5:42
4.	"I Can Talk to You"	6:15

Side B
No.	Title	Length
1.	"Deep Water"	5:26
2.	"Out on the Edge Again"	3:10
3.	"Hiding from the Light"	4:36
4.	"Wintertime in Amsterdam"	6:10

== Charts ==
Chart (1977)	Peak position
Australian Albums (Kent Music Report)	11

== Personnel ==
Musicians

- Richard Clapton – vocals, guitar
- Tony Ansell – keyboards
- Tony Buchanan – saxophone (tracks 2, 7, 8)
- Dalvanius, Diane McLennan – backing vocals
- Gunther Gorman – bass guitar (tracks 2, 3, 4, 6, 7), lead guitar (track 2)
- Michael Hegerty – bass guitar
- Kirk Lorange – lead guitar
- Cleis Pearce – viola
- Jim Penson – drums (track 5)
- Greg Sheehan – drums, percussion

Technical and recording

- Producer – Richard Batchens at Festival Studios, Sydney
- Audio engineer – John Frolich, Batchens
- Artwork – Geoff Kleem
- Photography – Violette Hamilton

== Release history ==
Country	Date	Label	Format	Catalog
Australia	October 1977	Infinity Records	LP	L 36352
Australia	1992	Infinity Records	CD / Cassette	C19584, D19584
Australia	16 August 2024	Warner Music Australia	CD / LP / digital	2173225815
