= Fall Down (Jebediah song) =

Single by Jebediah

from the album Jebediah
- Released: 29 October 2001
- Recorded: July – August 2001
- Genre: Alternative rock
- Length: 9:24
- Label: Redline Records
- Songwriter(s): Chris Daymond, Brett Mitchell, Kevin Mitchell and Vanessa Thornton
- Producer(s): Magoo

Jebediah singles chronology
"Please Leave" (2000)	"Fall Down" (2001)	"Nothing Lasts Forever" (2002)

"Fall Down" a song Australian alternative rock band Jebediah. Released in October 2001 as the lead single from the bands self-titled album, Jebediah. "Fall Down" reached number 24 on the Australian ARIA Singles Chart.

== Critical reception ==
Carmine Pascuzzi describes the song as being "more serious than it might appear." She goes onto state that "It’s still a relatively mild, pop-infected song that has that distinct Jebediah grain, and it’s a good one to get into too. It’s spirited, with the added bagpipe influence, a rare advancement into something more experimental for this band."

Michael Tran at Oz Music Central describes the song's "pop urgency and infectious "oohs"" as setting "the agenda for the rest of the album."

== Music video ==
The music video for the song featured the four band members performing in kilts (the song features bagpipes).

== Track listing ==
No.	Title	Length
1.	"Fall Down"	3:15
2.	"Television Lies"	2:28
3.	"Hey Presto!"	3:37

== Charts ==
Chart (2001)	Peak position
Australia (ARIA)	21
