= Animal (Jebediah song) =

Single by Jebediah

from the album Of Someday Shambles
- A-side: "Animal"
- B-side: "Simple"
- Released: 9 August 1999
- Recorded: April–June 1999
- Genre: Alternative rock
- Length: 4:29
- Label: Murmur
- Songwriters: Chris Daymond, Brett Mitchell, Kevin Mitchell, Vanessa Thornton
- Producer: Mark Trombino

Jebediah singles chronology
"Harpoon" (1998)	"Animal" (1999)	"Feet Touch the Ground" (1999)

"Animal" is a song by Australian alternative rock band Jebediah's, released on 9 August 1999 as the lead single from the band's second studio album. The song reached number 16 on the Australian ARIA Singles Chart and polled at number 19 on national radio station, Triple J's Hottest 100 for 1999. The track was co-written by all four band members: Chris Daymond, Brett Mitchell, Kevin Mitchell and Vanessa Thornton.

== Background ==
"Animal" was recorded during the sessions for Of Someday Shambles, from April to June 1999, by Jebediah with American producer, Mark Trombino (Knapsack, Jimmy Eat World, Blink 182). The group's line-up was Chris Daymond on guitar, Kevin Mitchell on lead vocals and rhythm guitar, Vanessa Thornton on bass guitar and Kevin's older brother, Brett Mitchell, on drums. All four members co-wrote the track. Brett Mitchell explained that "Animal" is "a flat out pop-song with all the associated cool energy. What's unusual for us is that it doesn't have a breakdown section, the rhythm is constant from the word go to the end. One of the simplest songs we've ever done as far as arrangements go. It sounds like nasty Ratcat or something."

The 7" vinyl record version has "Simple" as the B-side. The CD single version includes two previously unreleased tracks, "Supposed to Say" and "The Less Trusted Pain Remover". "Supposed to Say" features Lisa Jayne on guest vocals (a.k.a. LJ), a singer-songwriter with Melbourne dance-pop outfit, Jubestar.

"Animal" and "The Less Trusted Pain Remover" were both included on the split EP, Jimmy Eat World/Jebediah, with United States band, Jimmy Eat World. That EP contained three tracks by each artist and was released in August 2000 on Redline Records (an independent label co-founded by Jebediah with its management company) in Australia and Big Wheel Recreation in the US. "Simple" was also included on the 2001 re-issue of the Jimmy Eat World/Jebediah split EP instead of "Animal".

== Music video ==
The music video for "Animal" featured a "behind-the-scenes of a music video" narrative and depicted the band members in various production roles.

== Soundtrack appearances ==
"Animal" was used on the soundtrack for season one, episode 11, of the Australian TV drama series, McLeod's Daughters (2001–2002). It was used again in season three, episode 21 (2002–2003), and in season four, episode 6 (2003–2004). The B-side, "Simple", had been used for the feature film, Occasional Coarse Language (1998).

== Reception ==
"Animal" was released as a single on 9 August 1999 which reached number 16 on the Australian ARIA Singles Chart and polled at number 19 on Triple J's Hottest 100 for 1999.

AllMusic's Melissa Giannini described "Animal" in her review of the split EP with Jimmy Eat World. She compared "Animal" with Jimmy Eat World's "Cautioners", "'[Animal'] suffers from Kevin Mitchell's too-prominent nasal vocals, which might have been less apparent had the song not held its position immediately after the remarkably pleasant 'Cautioners'." Greg Lawrence at WHAMMO.com.au reviewed Of Someday Shambles and felt that "Animal" "sets the tone of an album that’s strong but still fun – a real indication of a band honing its craft, growing up in public in the most enviable of ways."

== Track listing ==
All tracks are written by Chris Daymond, Brett Mitchell, Kevin Mitchell and Vanessa Thornton

7" vinyl version
No.	Title	Length
1.	"Animal" (single version)	4:29
2.	"Simple"	3:45

All tracks are written by Chris Daymond, Brett Mitchell, Kevin Mitchell and Vanessa Thornton

CD single version
No.	Title	Length
1.	"Animal" (single version)	4:29
2.	"Supposed to Say"	1:55
3.	"The Less Trusted Pain Remover"	6:27
4.	"Animal" (live video)

== Credits ==
Jebediah members

- Chris Daymond – guitar
- Brett Mitchell – drums
- Kevin Mitchell – vocals
- Vanessa Thornton – bass guitar

Additional musicians

- Lisa Jayne (a.k.a. LJ) – vocals ("Supposed to Say")

Recording details

- Andrew Christie – artwork layout, design
- Dave Davis – assistant producer, assistant recorder, assistant mixing
- Matt Duffy – assistant producer, assistant recorder, assistant mixing
- Brian Gardner – mastering
- Ben Steele – artwork layout, design
- Christie Steele – photography
- Mark Trombino – producer, recorder, mixing

== Charts ==
Chart (1999)	Peak position
Australia (ARIA)	16
