= Girls on the Avenue =

Studio album by Richard Clapton
- Released: April 1975
- Studio: Festival Studio 24, Sydney
- Genre: Rock
- Length: 40:02
- Label: Infinity/Festival
- Producer: Richard Batchens

Richard Clapton chronology
Prussian Blue (1973)	Girls on the Avenue (1975)	Main Street Jive (1976)

Singles from Girls on the Avenue
- 1. "Travelling Down the Castlereagh"/"Girls on the Avenue" Released: January 1975; 2. "Down the Road" Released: June 1975

Girls on the Avenue is the second studio album by Australian rock music singer-songwriter, Richard Clapton, which was released in April 1975. It peaked at number 33 on the Kent Music Report Albums Chart. The title track reached number 4 on the related Singles Chart. It was originally released as the B-side of "I'm Travelling Down the Castlereagh", after considerable radio play, it was named as the A-side. The album was produced by Richard Batchens who later produced albums for the Australian band Sherbet, and was released on CD in 1990.

At the 1975 Australian Record Awards, the album won Male Vocal Album.

== Reception ==
In May 1975 Tony Catterall of The Canberra Times felt Girls on the Avenue showed that Clapton was, "suffering from a case of rock schizophrenia: he can't make up his mind whether to be himself, or Australia's answer to Van Morrison... [he's] better off being himself and stick to his fine, gentle rock with his distinctive, melodic voice because it's on tracks, like the title cut where he's at his best... [He] is capable of writing above average lyrics when he's working from his own travelling experiences, [but] when he tries to extrapolate too far from them he falls into banalities that are only made worse by a singing style intended to make them sound profound."

Australian rock music journalist, Ed Nimmervoll, observed that, "Almost universally [the title track] was assumed that his song was a sympathetic ode to street walkers... Girls on the Avenue, the song and the album, assured that [Clapton] had Australia's attention from now on. The rest of the album's songs revisited the themes on [his] first album... [The second album's cover] saw Richard depicted with what appeared to be the heroines of his song. One really was!"

== Track listing ==
All tracks are written by Richard Clapton, unless otherwise indicated

Side A
No.	Title	Length
1.	"Girls on the Avenue"	4:02
2.	"Down the Road"	4:29
3.	"Blue Bay Blues"	4:48
4.	"Throw Me Down a Line"	3:13
5.	"Burn Down Your Bridges"	4:09

Side B
No.	Title	Length
1.	"Rose Wine Cafe"	5:29
2.	"Ode to a Slowboat"	5:44
3.	"I Fell for You"	3:49
4.	"The Ride Out"	4:29

== Personnel ==
Band Members

- Richard Clapton – guitar, lead vocals
- Red McKelvie – lead guitar
- Brian Bethell – bass guitar
- Tony Ansell – keyboards
- Dave Ovendon – drums
- Cleis Pearce – Viola

Production

- Richard Batchens – engineer, producer at Festival Studio 24, Sydney

== Charts ==
Chart (1975)	Peak position
Australian Albums (Kent Music Report)	33

== Release history ==
Country	Date	Label	Format	Catalog
Australia	April 1975	Infinity Records	LP, Album; Cassette	L 35508; C35508
Australia	1990	Festival Records, Infinity Records	CD (Re-Release)	D 35508/D 19582
