= Dark Spaces =

Studio album by Richard Clapton
- Released: August 1980
- Studio: Festival Studios
- Label: Infinity/Festival
- Producer: Richard Clapton

Richard Clapton chronology
Hearts on the Nightline (1979)	Dark Spaces (1980)	The Great Escape (1982)

Singles from Dark Spaces
- 1. "Get Back to the Shelter" Released: June 1980; 2. "High Society" Released: October 1980

Dark Spaces is the sixth studio album by Australian rock music singer-songwriter, Richard Clapton. It was recorded at Festival Studios, Sydney, engineered by Mark Moffatt, and released in Australia in August 1980. It peaked at No. 23 on the Kent Music Report Albums Chart.

The album featured the line-up of Tony Ansell, Mark Moffatt (lead guitar), Stars' Andrew Durant (rhythm guitar), Clive Harrison (bass; ex-Kush, Avalanche) and Dragon's Kerry Jacobsen (drums), plus contributions from Cleis Pearce (viola), Tony Buchanan (sax), Sam McNally (synthesiser; ex-Stylus) and Mark Meyer (drums). Clapton dedicated the album to Durant, who died in June 1980.

== Track listing ==
All tracks are written by Richard Clapton.

Side A
No.	Title	Length
1.	"I Just Can't Make It"	2:40
2.	"High Society"	4:50
3.	"Shadows"	4:16
4.	"Sophisticated Girl"	4:29
5.	"Dark Spaces"	6:08

Side B
No.	Title	Length
1.	"Get Back to the Shelter"	5:30
2.	"Le Club Des Fools"	4:06
3.	"The Working Class Life"	4:10
4.	"Metropolis"	5:35

== Charts ==
Chart (1980)	Peak position
Australian Albums (Kent Music Report)	23

== Release history ==
Country	Date	Label	Format	Catalog
Australia	August 1980	Infinity Records / Festival	LP	L 37331
Australia	1992	Infinity Records	CD	D19587
