= All Fall Down, The Brandon deWilde Story =

2012 biography written by Patrisha McLean

- 1st ed. cover
- Author: Patrisha McLean
- Cover artist: Tony Reznak, Jr. Collection (photograph); Marcie Jan Bronstein (design)
- Language: English
- Subject: Biography
- Publisher: Faces, Incorporated
- Publication date: June 19, 2012
- Publication place: United States
- Media type: Print (Paperback)
- Pages: 191
- ISBN: 978-1936447121

All Fall Down, The Brandon deWilde Story is a 2012 biography written by Patrisha McLean and published by Faces, Incorporated. The book was released on June 19, 2012. It is McLean's first written, but second published, work. It is the only published biography of Brandon deWilde since his death in 1972.

== Summary and themes ==
All Fall Down, The Brandon deWilde Story covers mostly chronologically the life of Brooklyn-born Andre Brandon deWilde, growing up in Baldwin, Nassau County, New York, then moving to Manhattan with his parents after a series of events catapulted him from a typical seven-year-old American school boy to a national phenomenon as a child prodigy theatre and film actor that eventually earned him the tag of "one of America's most heartrending cultural icons".

McLean writes how deWilde achieved fame as the "tow-headed, gap-toothed boy" who starred in the films The Member of the Wedding (1952) and Shane (1953), the latter of which earned him an Academy Award for Best Supporting Actor nomination, at age 11, for uttering the immortal words "Shane, come back" to Alan Ladd. He continued into adulthood with similar successes, until an obsession with music and a dependence on drugs brought his career to a self-imposed standstill. In a twist of the child actor's curse, deWilde's problems arose not from a lack of work, but rather from a continuation of it. Well into his late 20s his youthful features had him performing roles as teenagers and college students. First married in 1963 at age 21, the union lasted until 1969, producing one son, Jesse. A second marriage in 1972, turning drug-free, and a return to the stage were all cut short when deWilde was killed in a motor vehicle accident at age 30.

Through personal interviews, public records, published accounts and deWilde's own words, McLean weaves her story from the time prior to his parents meeting through the aftermath and void left after his death. As reported on the RememberingBrandon.net website, "McLean's 2012 interviews with deWilde's elusive widow, Janice Gero, illuminate the dark period of Brandon's life with a candor and honesty heretofore unknown. 'We were so poor we went to the grocery store and were actually taking bags of beans and were putting them inside our clothes to get something to eat,' recalls Janice. 'I never forget it because I had never stolen anything.'"

== Writing process ==
McLean's manuscript had been a completed work for more than two decades having been put in repose because Brandon, "...never reached the cult status of other dead stars like James Dean", according to agents and publishers. About 75 important people in deWilde's life, some now deceased, contributed to the project including family members and friends, schoolmates, colleagues Paul Newman, Julie Harris, Patrick Wayne, Patricia Neal, Chuck Connors, Helen Hayes and others.

A combination of events in 2011 persuaded her to revive the project, including "an explosion" of information and worldwide interest on the internet, the encouragement from her daughter, Jackie Lee, a college senior and writer, and in 2012 finally locating and conducting a series of interviews with deWilde's widow.

McLean, a former newspaper reporter, had previously authored and published Maine Street: Faces and Stories from a Small Town (2009) with Down East Books. She resides in Camden, Maine, divorced from Don McLean, her husband of many years, and conducts an art photography of children business.

== Editions ==
A 14-chapter paperback 1st edition was released on June 19, 2012, with an autographed direct shipment as well. An expanded second edition soon followed.

== Contents ==
- Author's note (1)
- 1. A boy who will melt your heart (5)
- 2. Members of the whole world (11)
- 3. Golden boy (23)
- 4. Going places (39)
- 5. A class act (47)
- 6. King of the child stars (79)
- 7. Growing up (89)
- 8. All grown up (103)
- 9. There goes the movie star (109)
- 10. Member of the band (119)
- 11. So you wanna be a rock 'n roll star (147)
- 12. Wild in the sky (155)
- 13. Janice (163)
- 14. Butterflies are free (173)
- Photo gallery #1 (57)
- Photo gallery #2 (125)
- Acknowledgements (184)
- Bibliography (186)
- Career Credits (188)
