= We All Fall Down =

We All Fall Down may refer to:

== Literature ==
- "We all fall down", a line from the nursery rhyme "Ring a Ring o' Roses"
- We All Fall Down (Cormier novel), a 1991 novel by Robert Cormier
- We All Fall Down (Walters novel), a 2006 novel by Eric Walters
- We All Fall Down, a Christian science fiction novel by Brian Caldwell
- We All Fall Down, a 2019 novel by Daniel Kalla

== Film and television ==
=== Films ===
- We All Fall Down (1997 film), an Italian film directed by Davide Ferrario
- We All Fall Down (2000 film), a Canadian film directed by Martin Cummins
- We All Fall Down, a 2005 short film featuring Carly Schroeder
- We All Fall Down, a 2005 short film featuring Tara Killian

=== Television episodes ===
- "We All Fall Down" (Fear the Walking Dead), 2016
- "We All Fall Down", an episode of The Brittas Empire, 1996
- "We All Fall Down", an episode of Da Vinci's Inquest, 1998
- "We All Fall Down", an episode of Warehouse 13, 2012

== Music ==
=== Albums ===
- We All Fall Down (album), by Prozak, or the title song, 2013

=== Songs ===
- "We All Fall Down", by A-Trak, 2015
- "We All Fall Down", by Aerosmith from Music from Another Dimension!, 2012
- "We All Fall Down", by Bekka Bramlett, from the soundtrack of the film America's Sweethearts, 2001
- "We All Fall Down", by Blue Murder from Nothin' but Trouble, 1993
- "We All Fall Down", by Cavo from Bright Nights Dark Days, 2009
- "We All Fall Down", by Clint Black from Spend My Time, 2004
- "We All Fall Down", by D. C. Simpson from Shiver, 2005
- "We All Fall Down", by Diamond Rio from Completely, 2002
- "We All Fall Down", by Egg Hunt, B-side of "Me and You", 1986
- "We All Fall Down", by the Explosion from Black Tape, 2004
- "We All Fall Down", by I Like Trains from Elegies to Lessons Learnt, 2007
- "We All Fall Down", by John Miles from More Miles Per Hour, 1979
- "We All Fall Down", by Kate Alexa from Broken & Beautiful, 2006
- "We All Fall Down", by Ph.D. from Three, 2009
- "We All Fall Down", by Take That from Beautiful World, 2006

== See also ==
- "Goodbye, My Coney Island Baby", a song whose middle section is known as "We All Fall"
- All Fall Down (disambiguation)
