= Glory Road (Richard Clapton album) =

Studio album by Richard Clapton
- Released: October 1987
- Studio: Rhinoceros Studios, Sydney
- Label: WEA
- Producer: Jon Farriss

Richard Clapton chronology
Solidarity (1984)	Glory Road (1987)	The Best Years of Our Lives (1989)

Singles from Glory Road
- 1. "Glory Road" Released: September 1987; 2. "Trust Somebody" Released: December 1987; 3. "Angelou" Released: March 1988

Glory Road is the ninth studio album by Australian rock music singer-songwriter, Richard Clapton released in October 1987. The album reached No. 28 on the Kent Music Report Albums Chart.

== Track listing ==
All tracks are written by Richard Clapton (except where noted)

Side A
No.	Title	Writer(s)	Length
1.	"Trust Somebody (The Best of Friends)"		4:20
2.	"The Night Train"		4:21
3.	"Glory Road"		4:31
4.	"I Didn't Wanna Make You Stay"		4:12
5.	"The Emperors New Clothes"	Clapton, Garry Gary Beers, Jon Farriss, Tim Farriss	3:36

Side B
No.	Title	Writer(s)	Length
1.	"Chameleons"	Clapton, Jimmy Barnes, J. Farriss	3:50
2.	"The Underground"	Clapton, J. Farriss	5:07
3.	"Down to the Ark"		3:56
4.	"Angelou"		4:03
5.	"Modern Life"

== Charts ==
Chart (1987)	Peak position
Australian Albums (Kent Music Report)	28

== Release history ==
Country	Date	Label	Format	Catalog
Australia	October 1987	WEA	LP, CD, Cassette	600144-1, 600144-2, 600144-4
