= Megan Hart =

American novelist

- Born: 27 March 1971 (age 55); Harrisburg, Pennsylvania
- Education: Indiana University of Pennsylvania
- Occupation: Author
- Writing career
- Pen name: Megan Hart, Megan E. Hart, Mina Hardy, Em Garner
- Years active: 2002–present
- Period: Contemporary
- Genres: Erotic literature; thriller

Megan Hart (born March 27, 1971 in Harrisburg, Pennsylvania) is a New York Times best-selling American author of over forty romance and erotic novels, novellas and short stories, as well as thriller novels written under the pseudonym Mina Hardy.

Hart became interested in writing after reading and rewriting Ray Bradbury's short story Homecoming as a child. She decided to become a writer at the age of twelve after reading Stephen King's The Stand. She received a degree in journalism from Indiana University of Pennsylvania in 1993, and resumed writing fiction in 1998, publishing her first book in 2002. She lives in Dayton, Ohio.

When Fifty Shades of Grey popularised erotic fiction, the 2012 reissue of Hart's novel Switch entered the extended New York Times bestseller list. It peaked at 24th place, and remained on the web only list for three weeks.

== Selected books ==
- Dirty (Harlequin Spice, 2007)
- No Reservations (Virgin Books, 2009)
- Switch (Harlequin Spice, 2010)
- Collide (Harlequin Spice, 2011)
- Precious and Fragile Things (Mira Books, 2011)
- All Fall Down (2012)
- Every Part of You (St. Martin's Press Griffin, 2014)
- Don't Deny Me (St. Martin's Press Griffin, 2015)
- Forbidden Stranger (St. Martin's Press Swerve, 2018)

== Awards ==
- 2009 RT Reviewers Choice Best Book Award, Erotic Fiction: Deeper
- 2013 Publishers Weekly Starred Review: Tear You Apart
- 2013 RT Book Review, Top Pick: Tear You Apart
- 2013 RT Reviewers Choice Award, Book of the Year: Tear You Apart
- 2013 RT Seal of Excellence: Tear You Apart
- 2016 RT Book Review, Top Pick: Little Secrets
- 2016 RT Seal of Excellence: Little Secrets
