= Richard Clapton =

Australian singer-songwriter, musician, producer

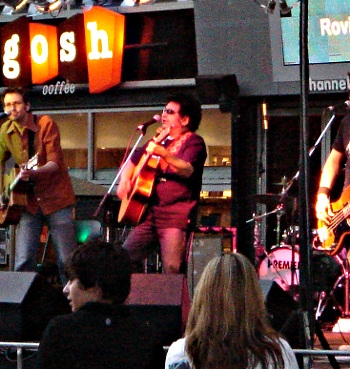
- Clapton (centre) performing at The Entertainment Quarter in October 2005

Background information
- Born: 18 May 1948 (age 78)
- Origin: Sydney, New South Wales, Australia
- Genre: Rock
- Occupations: Singer; songwriter; producer
- Instruments: Vocals; guitar
- Years active: 1965–present
- Labels: Infinity; Festival; Mushroom; WEA, Warner; Sony; Columbia
- Website: richardclapton.com

Richard Clapton (born 18 May 1948) is an Australian singer-songwriter-guitarist and producer. His solo top 20 hits on the Kent Music Report Singles Chart are "Girls on the Avenue" (1975) and "I Am an Island" (1982). He reached the top 20 on the related albums chart with Goodbye Tiger (1977), Hearts on the Nightline (1979), The Great Escape (1982) and The Very Best of Richard Clapton (1982). Clapton's highest-charting album, Music Is Love (1966–1970) (April 2021), peaked at number 3 on the ARIA Chart.

As a producer he worked on the second INXS album, Underneath the Colours (1981). In 1983, he briefly joined the Party Boys for a tour of eastern Australia and their live album, Greatest Hits (Of Other People) (1983), before resuming his solo career. Australian rock music historian Ian McFarlane described Clapton as "one of the most important Australian songwriters of the 1970s." On 12 October 1999, Clapton was inducted into the Australian Recording Industry Association (ARIA) hall of fame. In August 2014 he published his memoirs, The Best Years of Our Lives.

== Career ==
=== Early years ===
Richard Clapton was born on 18 May 1948, however his birth name is elusive. When the artist changed his birth name in the mid-1960s, he used the last names of two of his music heroes, Keith Richards and Eric Clapton. Speculation over his age has varied: an article in Who magazine (1996) gives his birth year as 1951, while Ian McFarlane's Encyclopedia of Australian Rock and Pop (1999) has 1949. In a 2002 interview with The Age's Warwick McFadyen, he described himself as being 50-something.

Clapton's mother was a night nurse at a Sydney hospital and his Australian-Chinese father was a doctor—they had a volatile relationship and divorced when Clapton was two years old. During his childhood, Clapton had no contact with his father and lived with his mother, who had mental health problems. She would periodically place him in care until she committed suicide when he was aged ten. Clapton met his father at her funeral and was subsequently enrolled in a Sydney boarding school, Trinity Grammar, at Summer Hill. As an adolescent he listened to the Rolling Stones and Bob Dylan, and was given his first electric guitar by a school friend's father. He cites Richard Wherrett—his house master and English teacher at Trinity who later became a theatre director—as an early mentor.

In 1965, Clapton formed Darktown Strutters with Ross Andreasen, Mick Bradley, Will Fowler, Dennis Hunter, Ross Lamonde and Ian Peepman. He left school in his final year without completing his mathematics examination. He played guitar while training as a commercial artist in the 1960s. He raised enough money to board ship, in late 1967, via MS Achille Lauro, to London where he played with three locals in a pre-punk group. This was followed by a group with four North Americans who were raided by the police for marijuana importing. His visa had expired and he moved to Germany, where he played in a band, Bitch; he worked solo in folk clubs and on streets busking. Clapton, as guitarist and vocalist, was a member of Sopwith Camel (not the United States band of same name), with Burghard Rausch on drums and Michael Günther on bass guitar (both members of krautrock group Agitation Free). Clapton emerged in the early 1970s as a singer-songwriter in the "troubadour" style of Neil Young and Jackson Browne.

=== 1972–74: Debut album: Prussian Blue ===
In March 1972, Clapton returned to Australia from Rotterdam via SS Orcades. He signed a publishing deal with Essex Music and a recording deal with Infinity Records, a subsidiary of Festival Records. His debut single, "Last Train to Marseilles", was released in October of that year. Clapton was backed by Red McKelvie on guitar (ex-the Flying Circus), Kenny Kitching on pedal steel, John Capek on piano (ex-Carson) with John Bois on bass guitar and Tony Bolton on drums, both from Country Radio (see Greg Quill). At the end of the year he briefly joined a jazz-rock group, Sun, for six weeks into early 1973—he replaced their previous lead singer, Renée Geyer.

Clapton's debut solo album, Prussian Blue, appeared in November 1973—it included "Last Train to Marseilles" from a year earlier—and was produced by Richard Batchens (Blackfeather, Sherbet). Two more singles were issued, "All the Prodigal Children" in October and "I Wanna Be a Survivor" in July 1974. On "Hardly Know Myself" and "I Wanna Be a Survivor" Clapton was backed by the La De Da's, with other tracks variously featuring McKelvie, Glenn Cardier on guitar, Russell Dunlop on drums, Mike Perjanik on organ, Trevor Wilson and Mike Lawler on bass guitar and Ian Bloxham on percussion.

According to rock historian Noel McGrath, the album suffered from lack of radio exposure—Australian commercial pop radio was overtaken by a local version of the Drake-Chenault "More Music" format—with a drastically restricted play list shutting out many Australian performers. Garry Raffaele of The Canberra Times observed, "[he] sounds as though he's involved with the real issues of our time—pollution, man's inhumanity to those who share Spaceship Earth with him, communication difficulties. He writes of these things but his words are not likely to convince anybody. It's the simplistic trap again."

Due to grass-roots support, Prussian Blue sold steadily and four years later it was still selling 200–500 copies per week. Critics praised the album, which contained songs written while in Europe and Festival kept him on their books. He described the title track in Rolling Stone Australia as "the only song I ever contrived" and "came about when I was going through my 'wanna-write-me-a-masterpiece' stage, which everyone goes through". It took, "six weeks getting all the right clever rhymes and all".

=== 1975–77: Girls on the Avenue to Main Street Jive ===
Clapton's commercial breakthrough came with his single, "Girls on the Avenue", issued in January 1975. Although Festival had little faith in the song—initially releasing it as the B-side of "Travelling Down the Castlereagh"—it was picked up by radio and reached No. 4 on the Australian Kent Music Report Singles Chart in March. According to Clapton:

"Not only did I not feel that 'Girls on the Avenue' was the perfect song, but Festival Records rejected that song six times. They'd say to me, 'What's the chorus, is it "Don't you slip" or "Friday night ..."?' I don't know! Why does a song have to have a hook or a chorus? You either like the song or you don't!"

The song was written about his observations of women from and around the Avenue, Rose Bay, although it was seen as a paean to prostitutes by the record label, radio commentators and the prostitutes themselves. According to Clapton, it took half an hour to write. He said the only real money he ever made out of "Girls on the Avenue" was when it became available "on one of those bargain Explosive Hits (compilations) and they sell about 400,000 each time". According to him, in 1976 there were three cover versions of it: one by Mike McGear, another by ex-Fairport Convention member Trevor Lucas and an obscure Greek version.

The album Girls on the Avenue, also produced by Batchens, appeared in April 1975. For touring and session work he formed the Richard Clapton Band with John Carr on guitar, Ken Firth on bass guitar, Ace Follington on drums, McKelvie on guitar and Tony Slavich on keyboards. The album cover depicted Clapton with three women—one was a prostitute. Other tracks dealt with similar themes to his debut album. Because of the commercial nature of the song, he was accused of selling out by deliberately writing a commercial song, a claim he refuted. A second single, "Down the Road", was released in June but did not chart.

Clapton moved to Melbourne to write new material for his third album, Main Street Jive, which released in July 1976, again produced by Batchens. He contributed six tracks to the film soundtrack for Highway One (1976). It provided the single, "Capricorn Dancer", which reached No. 40 in early 1977 and remains a concert staple. Other contributors to the soundtrack, produced and engineered by Batchens, were the Dingoes, Bilgola Bop Band, Skyhooks and Ol' 55 with one track each. Clapton toured Europe at the end of 1976 with his band including Slavich, Michael Hegerty on bass guitar (ex-Stars), Kirk Lorange on lead guitar and Jim Penson on drums (ex-Blackfeather).

=== 1977–79: Goodbye Tiger ===
The song, "Goodbye Tiger", was written after Clapton and his friend were in Sydney to see Hunter S. Thompson. The singer-songwriter was referred to as "Tiger" by "[his] 'beat poet' buddies." They got drunk and the binge continued as he got on a flight to Germany before crashing out at a friend's place in Frankfurt. Clapton described how it was the only time he had ever written a song and not gone back to change something, "It seemed like it had been the end of our innocence or something." He was later snowed in at a resort in Denmark. He said there was a blizzard and they were trapped, "but we had enough beer so it didn't really matter". It was there he wrote the bulk of what became his fourth studio album, Goodbye Tiger.

It was released in August 1977 and was acclaimed by McFarlane as "his most celebrated work, an album full of rich, melodic and accessible rock with a distinctly Australian flavour. It established Clapton's reputation as one of the most important Australian songwriters of the 1970s." It reached No. 11 on the albums chart in November 1977. It was the final album he recorded for Infinity Records and produced by Batchens. Many Clapton fans regard the melancholic record as his masterpiece: it included two of his popular tracks, the anthem, "Deep Water", which reached No. 43 in November and "Down in the Lucky Country" released in January 1978.

His backing band for Goodybe Tiger was: Hegerty, Lorange, Gunther Gorman on guitar, Diane McLennan on backing vocals, Cleis Pearce on viola (ex-MacKenzie Theory) and Greg Sheehan on drums (ex-Blackfeather, MacKenzie Theory). Additional musicians included Tony Ansell on keyboards, Tony Buchanan on saxophone and Penson. Australian rock music historian, Chris Spencer, cites the album as one of his favourites, "[It] represents one of the pinnacles of Australian rock music. Clapton, essentially a singer-songwriter, working within the security of numerous band line-ups, wrote his best lyrics on this album. He never reached the same heights again, particularly with his melodies, visions and observations of urban Australia."

Clapton said working on the album was the worst year of his life, "but I guess that's the record I will always be remembered for." During 1978 he toured nationally with Ansell, Hegerty, Lorange, McLennan and Sheehan. Late in that year he travelled to Los Angeles to record his fifth studio album, Hearts on the Nightline. Released in April 1979, it was produced by Dallas Smith for the Interfusion label on Festival. The album peaked at No. 17 but failed to attract international attention, it was supported by a 75-date national tour.

=== 1980s: Dark Spaces to Glory Road ===
Clapton returned to Sydney in 1980 to record and produce his sixth studio album, Dark Spaces (August 1980). His session musicians included Ansell, Andrew Durant on rhythm guitar (Stars), Clive Harrison on bass guitar (ex-Kush, Avalanche), Mark Moffatt on lead guitar and Kerry Jacobsen on drums (Dragon). It peaked in the top 30 and was dedicated to Durant who had died of cancer in May, before its release. Members of Stars, and various artists including Clapton, performed at the Andrew Durant Memorial Concert in August, which was released as a live double-album in February 1981. During the decade he consolidated his career, working with other artists and as a record producer. In May of that year he produced the third single, "The Loved One", for new wave band, INXS, which was recorded at Studios 301 in Sydney. It was a cover of a 1966 song by the Loved Ones and peaked in the Top 20. In July–August, he produced their second album Underneath the Colours, which reached the Top 20 after its October release.

In 1982 Clapton signed with WEA and the Mark Opitz-produced, The Great Escape (March 1982), had contributions from members of Cold Chisel and INXS. The album, which peaked at No. 8 in March, provided three singles. The hard-rocking "I Am an Island", with Cold Chisel's Ian Moss on guitar and Jimmy Barnes on backing vocals, reached the top 20. Two other singles, "Spellbound" (April) and "The Best Years of Our Lives" (September) did not chart in the top 50. In May, WEA released a compilation album, The Very Best of Richard Clapton, which reached No. 18 with The Great Escape still in the top 20.

In 1983 Clapton joined the Party Boys, replacing James Reyne (Australian Crawl) on lead vocals, the live album Greatest Hits (Of Other People) and a single, "I Fought the Law"—a cover of the Sonny Curtis song—resulted from an extensive tour of the east coast of Australia. Clapton left that band to re-focus on his solo career and was replaced on vocals by Shirley Strachan (ex-Skyhooks).

In September 1984 he released his eighth studio album, Solidarity, on Mushroom Records which was produced by Opitz, Ricky Fataar, Tim Kramer and Moffatt. For the album he used Graham Bidstrup on drums (ex-The Angels, the Party Boys), James Black on keyboards (ex-Mondo Rock), Kevin Borich on guitar (ex-La De Da's, the Party Boys), Fataar on drums, Allan Mansfield on keyboards (Dragon), Graham Thompson on bass guitar (ex-Stars), and backing vocals from Mary Bradfield, Venetta Fields and Mark Williams. Clapton and Borich released a duet single, "Spirit of Sydney", in 1986.

Clapton rejoined WEA in 1987 for his ninth album, Glory Road, released in October, and its three singles, which were produced by Jon Farriss of INXS as a return favour for the production of Underneath the Colours. A live album, The Best Years of Our Lives was recorded on 16 April 1989 and released in September. His band were Hegerty, Lorange, Moffatt on guitar, Jeff Bartolomei on keyboards, Ben Butler on guitar, and Steve Sowerby on drums. The album peaked in the top 30 on the Australian Recording Industry Association (ARIA) Albums Chart.

=== 1990s–2010: Continued success and ARIA Hall of Fame ===
Clapton was without a recording contract from 1989 to 1992 and had four changes of management until he signed with Sony Music/Columbia Records for the release of Distant Thunder in May 1993. It provided four singles and was produced by Clapton. It charted in the top 40 but no single reached the top 50 on ARIA's Singles Chart. His second album for Sony, Angeltown appeared in May 1996 with a single, "Dixieland", in March—neither reached their respective top 50 charts. In October 1999 Clapton released a compilation Richard Clapton – The Definitive Anthology, which peaked in the top 30. The album was released to coincide with his ARIA Hall of Fame induction at the ARIA Music Awards of 1999 alongside Jimmy Little. Clapton was inducted by INXS member, Andrew Farriss, he observed, "That's very apt. Especially since I wrote a really good song with Andrew a few months ago." At the Gimme Ted benefit concert on 9 March 2001 Clapton was backed by surviving members of INXS on four of his songs,

Clapton spent four years writing and recording his twelfth studio album, Diamond Mine, at his home studio, a process he described as the most creatively liberating experience of his recording career. It was released in May 2004—eight years after his previous studio album—but did not chart. On his 2006 album, Rewired, also recorded in the home studio, Clapton provided "unplugged" or acoustic versions of his early songs.

Clapton had appeared on Countdown—an Australian pop music show on national broadcaster, ABC-TV—during the late 1970s and early 1980s. He toured with other artists in the Countdown Spectacular two series of concerts in Australia between late-August and early-September 2007. He sang three of his songs, including the crowd favourite, "Girls on the Avenue".

In 2008 on Australia Day (26 January) Clapton performed at Parliament House, Canberra. To celebrate 35 years of recording, Clapton held a one-off concert at the Sydney State Theatre on 28 June. The event included a line-up of Australian musicians who had played with him including Jon Farriss from INXS. The performance was recorded for a live album, Live at the State Theatre, which was released in October.

Clapton showcases his 1977 album, Goodbye Tiger, at that same venue in September 2009. The first concert sold out in less than an hour and a second was added. The entire album was performed as well as an eclectic mix of old and new tracks played in the second set. On the second night Clapton and band were joined by Moss (Cold Chisel) who played a rendition of "I Am an Island". Clapton inducted one of his favourite bands, the Dingoes into the ARIA Hall of Fame on 29 August 2009. Clapton's portrait by Alexander McKenzie was a finalist in 2009 for the Archibald Prize. McKenzie explained his choice of subject, "He's got great a personality and face for painting. He himself admits he's no beauty but he's a lovely man and I've always liked what he does." In October 2010, Goodbye Tiger was listed at No. 15 in the book, 100 Best Australian Albums.

=== 2010–present: Later years ===
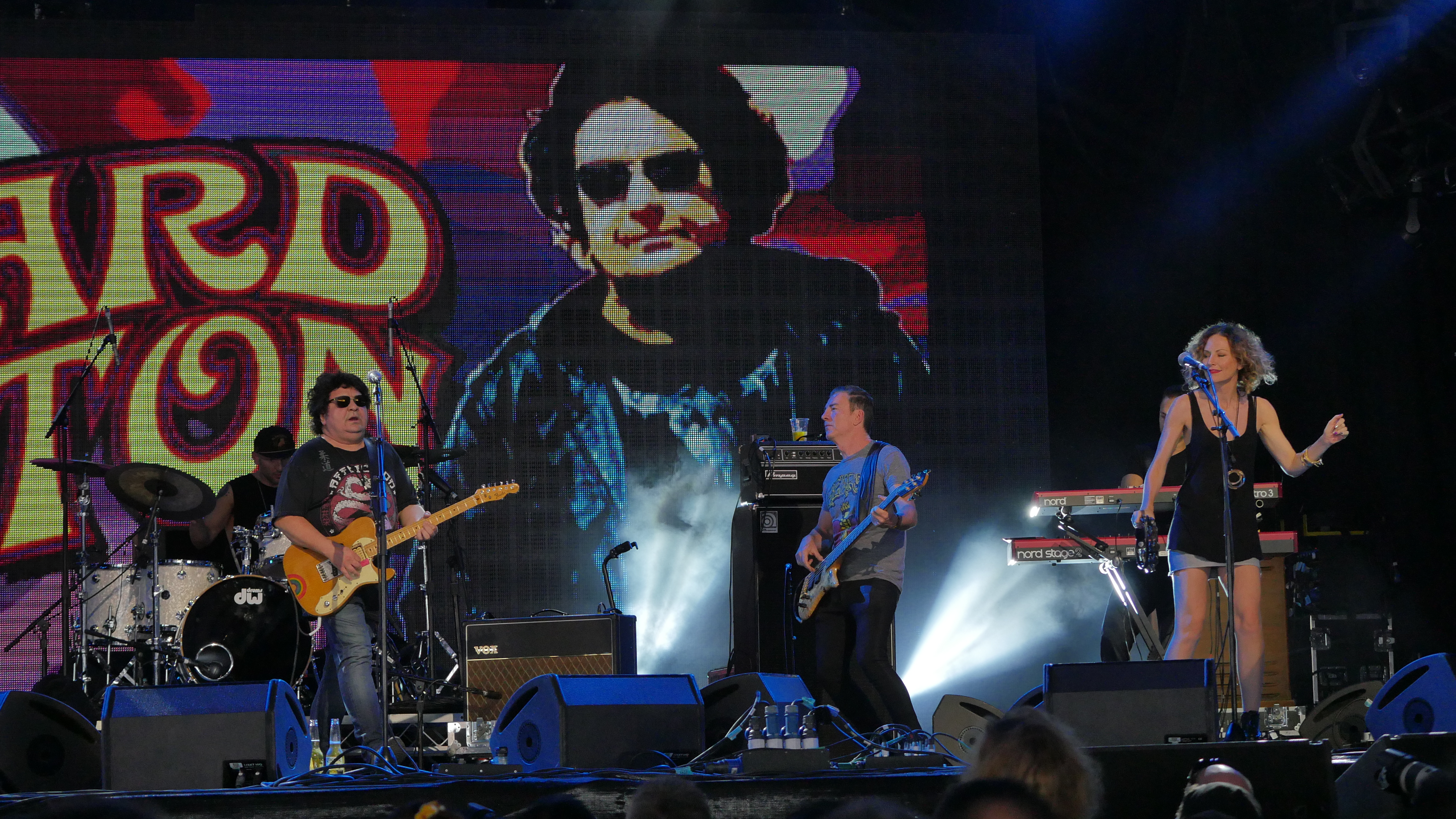
Clapton (at left) performing at Bluesfest, March 2016

In August 2012 Clapton's first studio album in eight years, Harlequin Nights, was issued on his own label and distributed by MGM. He was assisted on the album by Danny Spencer on guitar, who also co-wrote some tracks. The Australian's reviewer noted that Clapton "hasn't lost his touch as a songwriter" as the album "veers between the heady optimism of opening track 'Sunny Side Up' and the poignant autumnal reflection of the beautiful 'Blue Skies'" while Clapton is a "troubadour buffeted by uncertain winds and still searching for answers in songs such as the epic 'Vapour Trails' but pushing on regardless in the folksy 'Run Like a River'".

In August 2014, a retrospective album titled Best Years 1974–2014: The 40th Anniversary Collection was released and peaked at number 36 on the ARIA Charts. He issued his fifteenth studio album, House of Orange, in April 2016, which was recorded in Nashville with Moffatt co-producing. Brooke Hunter of girl.com.au noticed, "Working with [Moffatt] in the U.S. has put a country – soul twang into [Clapton]'s band that spills out into classics like 'Deep Water", 'The Best Years of Our Lives", 'Goodbye Tiger' and so many other songs that have made [him] a national treasure."

In April 2021 Clapton released his 16th studio album, Music Is Love (1966–1970), which was preceded by the lead single, The Lovin' Spoonful's "Summer in the City" (February 2021). All 15 tracks are cover versions of works from the late 1960s – his formative years – and were recorded with Terry Blamey as executive producer for Bloodllines/Mushroom Group labels. Clapton described these songs as being relevant to recent events, "As the world dealt with Trump, COVID-19 and racial unrest." Music Is Love (1966–1970) peaked at number 3 on the ARIA Albums Chart–his highest position.

In April 2023, it was announced that Clapton has signed with Concord Music Publishing.

== Personal life ==
Clapton's mother was a nurse who died when he was ten; his father was a doctor who died in c. 2004. Clapton has pterygiums and his eye surgeon recommended he wear dark glasses. When he left Australia in the late 1960s he travelled to London with Lois Grace Sattler (born 1946) The couple married in Kensington in March 1971, and in May 1972 they returned to Australia. She worked as a production assistant at Australian Museum, Sydney in 1973.

Clapton met Susie, a fashion model, in the mid-1980s. They married and had a set of twins. In March 2008 he appeared on ABC-TV's Talking Heads where he told Peter Thompson about his early life. He described the impact of his mother's erratic lifestyle prior to her suicide when he was ten; he then met his father for the first time and was enrolled in a private boarding school: "My mother was sort of the antithesis of my father, because she had always aspired to... more the Bohemian artistic side of life" and "it was a bit of a shock when my father came to collect me... we just never got on. It was a fiery clash from the very start. My father obviously wanted me to become a doctor or some similar sort of career".

Clapton started writing his autobiography in mid-2010, which he hoped would appear later that year. He told Moran of The Sunday Telegraph, "I have no regrets about anything in my life. It has been a very colourful ride. I don't want to homogenise and pasteurise this book because I don't have any regrets about anything I've done in my life". Clapton and Susie were divorced by July 2012. He told Paul Cashmere of Noise11.com, "I went through a really miserable divorce ... I wrote a couple of songs like 'Over the Borderline' which was a last ditch attempt to make amends with my ex-wife. The divorce got very long and drawn out. It went on for about five years which is just absurd".

On 1 August 2014, Clapton published his memoirs, The Best Years of Our Lives, via Allen & Unwin. The Observer's Tammy Lewis felt, "[it] begins from the late 60s and continues to 1990, as he was forced to keep the word limit down... it continues to touch on intrigue, excitement and some rather PG related stories." James Rose of Daily Review, observed, "He writes vernacular very well. Lot’s [sic] of swearing and sexual exploits (mostly others, less his own). For Oz Rock fans, there’s plenty of behind the scenes dirt and goss on big names..." As of November 2018 Clapton's domestic partner is Meegan White.

== Bibliography ==
- Clapton, Richard (1 August 2014), The Best Years of Our Lives, Crows Nest, NSW: Allen & Unwin, ISBN 978-1-76011-059-8

== Discography ==
- Prussian Blue (1973)
- Girls on the Avenue (1975)
- Main Street Jive (1976)
- Goodbye Tiger (1977)
- Hearts on the Nightline (1979)
- Dark Spaces (1980)
- The Great Escape (1982)
- Solidarity (1984)
- Glory Road (1987)
- Distant Thunder (1993)
- Angeltown (1996)
- Diamond Mine (2004)
- Rewired (2006)
- Harlequin Nights (2012)
- The House of Orange (2016)
- Music Is Love (1966–1970) (2021)

== Awards and nominations ==
=== Australian Record Awards ===
Year	Nominee / work	Award	Result
1975	Girls on the Avenue	Male Vocal Album	Won

=== ARIA Music Awards ===
The ARIA Music Awards is an annual awards ceremony that recognises excellence, innovation, and achievement across all genres of Australian music. They commenced in 1987.

Year	Nominee / work	Award	Result
1999	Richard Clapton	ARIA Hall of Fame	inductee

=== Australian Songwriter's Hall of Fame ===
The Australian Songwriters Hall of Fame was established in 2004 to honour the lifetime achievements of some of Australia's greatest songwriters.

Year	Nominee / work	Award	Result
2010	himself	Australian Songwriter's Hall of Fame	inducted

=== Countdown Australian Music Awards ===
Countdown was an Australian pop music TV series on national broadcaster ABC-TV from 1974 to 1987, it presented music awards from 1979 to 1987, initially in conjunction with magazine TV Week. The TV Week / Countdown Awards were a combination of popular-voted and peer-voted awards.

Year	Nominee / work	Award	Result
1984	himself	Best Songwriter	Nominated
