= Solidarity (Richard Clapton album) =

Studio album by Richard Clapton
- Released: September 1984
- Studio: Rhinoceros Studios, Sydney
- Label: Mushroom
- Producer: Mark Opitz

Richard Clapton chronology
The Very Best of Richard Clapton (1982)	Solidarity (1984)	Glory Road (1987)

Singles from Solidarity
- 1. "The Heart of It" Released: August 1984; 2. "Solidarity" Released: October 1984

Solidarity is the eighth studio album by Australian rock music singer-songwriter, Richard Clapton. It was released in Australia in September 1984 It peaked at No. 27 on the Kent Music Report Albums Chart.

== Track listing ==
All tracks are written by Richard Clapton

Side A
No.	Title	Length
1.	"The Heart of It"	4:23
2.	"Chinatown"	3:22
3.	"Amsterdam"	5:15
4.	"Kathleen"	4:37
5.	"Solidarity"	5:10

Side B
No.	Title	Length
1.	"Feelin' Alright Tonight"	3:07
2.	"Katy's Leaving Babylon"	4:08
3.	"Cry Mercy Sister"	4:21
4.	"Atom Bomb"	3:40
5.	"New World"	6:09

== Charts ==
Chart (1984)	Peak position
Australian Albums (Kent Music Report)	27

== Release history ==
Country	Date	Label	Format	Catalog
Australia	September 1984	Mushroom Records	LP, Cassette	RML 53137
Canada	1985	Duke Street Records	LP	DSR 31016
Australia	1991	Mushroom Records	CD, Cassette	D19462
