= The Best Years of Our Lives (Richard Clapton album) =

Live album by Richard Clapton
- Released: September 1989
- Recorded: 16 April 1989
- Genre: pop, rock
- Length: 73:49
- Label: WEA

Richard Clapton chronology
Glory Road (1987)	The Best Years of Our Lives (1989)	Distant Thunder (1993)

Singles from The Best Years of Our Lives
- 1. "Deep Water" Released: June 1989; 2. "Ace of Hearts" Released: September 1989

The Best Years of Our Lives is the debut live album by Australian rock musician Richard Clapton. The album was recorded in concert on 16 April 1989 and released in September 1989 and peaked at number 23 on the ARIA Charts.

== Track listing ==
1. "Deep Water" - 5:22
2. "Trust Somebody" - 3:47
3. "Ace of Hearts" - 5:15
4. "Blue Bay Blues" - 4:20
5. "Get Back to Shelter" - 6:02
6. "Night Train" - 5:33
7. "Capricorn Dancer" - 3:37
8. "Lucky Country" - 4:19
9. "High Society" - 4:34
10. "Girls on the Avenue" - 4:14
11. "Goodbye Tiger" - 5:14
12. "Angelou" - 4:15
13. "Glory Road" - 5:44
14. "I Am an Island" - 6:03
15. "The Best Years of Our Lives" - 4:30
- NB: All songs written by Richard Clapton.

== Charts ==
Chart (1989)	Peak position
Australian Albums (ARIA)	23

== Certification ==
Region	Certification	Certified units/sales
Australia (ARIA)	Platinum	70,000^{^}
^{^} Shipments figures based on certification alone.

== Release history ==
Country	Date	Label	Format	Catalogue
Australia	September 1989	WEA	CD, Cassette, 2xLP	256582-1, 256582-2, 256582-4
Australia	July 2004	Warner	CD	2565822
