= Highway One (film) =

- Theatrical film poster
- Produced by: Steve Otton
- Distributed by: Highway Productions
- Release date: 27 January 1977
- Running time: 77 minute
- Country: Australia
- Language: English
- Budget: $40,000

Highway One is a 1977 Australian documentary film by Steve Otton, which features Trudie Adams.

== Plot ==
Adventures of a group of surfers who travel the coast surfing and showing "Morning of the Earth".

== Impact ==
In 2018, the film was rediscovered by ABC's investigative team and revealed it features Trudie Adams when she was 18 years old, a year before she went missing in June 1978. In the film, Adams plays the girlfriend of the main character and footage shows her dancing with her on-screen boyfriend and sharing a romantic candlelit dinner. Adams is chatting with friends, and appears fresh-faced and carefree.

== Cast ==
- Kim Bradley - Surfer
- Philip Moneroz - Surfer
- Robert Steen - Surfer

== Soundtrack ==
Highway One

Soundtrack album
- Released: 1976
- Label: Infinity Records, Festival Records
- Producer: Richard Batchens

Singles from Highway One
- 1. "Capricorn Dancer" Released: January 1977

A soundtrack was released in 1976 and featured music by Richard Clapton, The Dingoes, Ol' 55, Skyhooks and Bigola Bop Band. The single "Capricorn Dancer" peaked at number 40 on the Australian Kent Music Report.

=== Track listing ===
Side A
No.	Title	Writer(s)	Length
1.	"Down the Road" (performed by Richard Clapton)	Richard Clapton	4:17
2.	"Boy on the Run" (performed by The Dingoes)	Broderick Smith, Chris Stockley	3:38
3.	"Longshore Rider" (performed by Richard Clapton)	Richard Clapton	2:56
4.	"Neighbours" (performed by Bilgola Bop Band)	Steve Brien, C Davis	3:38
5.	"Every Chase a Steeple" (performed by Skyhooks)	Red Symons	3:42

Side B
No.	Title	Writer(s)	Length
1.	"Highway One #2" (performed by Richard Clapton)	Richard Clapton	5:20
2.	"Capricorn Dancer" (performed by Richard Clapton)	Richard Clapton	3:50
3.	"Babe Rainbow" (performed by Richard Clapton)	Richard Clapton	4:56
4.	"Skateboard Thrills" (performed by Ol' 55)	James Manzie	2:32
5.	"Highway One" (performed by Richard Clapton)	Richard Clapton	3:52

=== Charts ===
Chart (1977)	Peak position
Australian Albums (Kent Music Report)	91

=== Release history ===
Country	Date	Label	Format	Catalog
Australia	1976	Infinity Records	LP	L 36138
