= I Am an Island (song) =

Single by Richard Clapton

from the album The Great Escape
- Released: February 1982
- Studio: Paradise Studio, Sydney
- Length: 5:03
- Label: WEA
- Songwriter(s): Richard Clapton
- Producer(s): Mark Opitz

Richard Clapton singles chronology
"High Society" (1980)	"I Am an Island" (1982)	"Spellbound" (1982)

"I Am an Island" is a song by Australian rock musician Richard Clapton. The song was released in February 1982 as the lead single from Clapton's seventh studio album, The Great Escape. The song peaked at number 20 on the Australian Kent Music Report; becoming Clapton's second top twenty single. It features Ian Moss on lead guitar, with Jimmy Barnes on backing vocals and Jon Farriss from INXS on drums.

== Track listing ==
Side one

1. "I Am an Island"

Side two

1. "Walk On Water"

== Charts ==
Chart (1982)	Peak position
Australian Kent Music Report	20
