= Girls on the Avenue (song) =

Single by Richard Clapton

from the album Girls on the Avenue
- A-side: "Travelling Down the Castlereagh"
- B-side: "Girls on the Avenue"
- Released: January 1975
- Recorded: 1974
- Genre: Rock
- Label: Festival
- Songwriter(s): Richard Clapton

Richard Clapton singles chronology
"I Wanna Be a Survivor" (1974)	"Girls on the Avenue" (1975)	"Down the Road" (1975)

"Girls on the Avenue" is a 1975 song from Australian singer-songwriter Richard Clapton. Released as the first single from the album of the same name, it reached number four on the Australian charts, Clapton's highest chart performance.

== Details ==
Initially released as the B-side of "Travelling Down the Castlereagh", the song became a hit after it was first played on Double J and then picked up by commercial radio. Clapton said, "I remember at the time Festival [Clapton's record label] thought "Girls on the Avenue" was absolute rubbish. Their comment was, 'We asked you to write a hit single. Where's the chorus? This is a pile of rubbish. It's just a myriad of ideas you've stuck together like a Frankenstein monster.'" The song took about half an hour to write.

Although the song was widely perceived to be about prostitutes, Clapton has stated it was actually about three girls who lived on The Avenue in Rose Bay, Sydney when he was living the next street over. Clapton was happy for the misunderstanding to continue, saying, "My manager at the time simply said 'Sex sells. Let that urban myth keep festering out there and you'll sell a lot of records.' and I did."

Clapton later said that much of the money he received from the song was because of its inclusion on a 1975 compilation called Ripper.

== Charts ==
=== Weekly charts ===
Chart (1975)	Peak position
Australia (Kent Music Report)	4

=== Year-end charts ===
Chart (1975)	Peak position
Australia (Kent Music Report)	49
