= Infinity Records =

Infinity Records was a short-lived subsidiary of MCA Records established in New York City in 1977. The label was conceived by MCA president Sidney Sheinberg as a way for the Los Angeles-based entertainment conglomerate to expand its business on the East Coast. Ron Alexenberg, who had previously been the head of the Epic Records division of CBS Records (now part of Sony Music Entertainment) was hired as CEO.

The biggest hit the Infinity label had was "Escape" by Rupert Holmes, which was number 1 at the end of 1979. Other acts that had chart entries on Infinity included Hot Chocolate, Dobie Gray, New England, Orleans, Orsa Lia, TKO and Spyro Gyra.

Under the distribution of MCA, the Infinity Records label released titles in the US, Canada, the UK, Japan and parts of Europe. Infinity spent lavishly on promotion but failed to earn a profit. In addition to developing new talent, Infinity also paid substantial sums to acquire established artists from other labels.

In October 1979, Infinity released Pope John Paul II Sings at the Festival of Sacrosong, an album of speeches and songs sung by Pope John Paul II in his native Polish. Due to the tremendous popularity of the new Pope, supported by a US tour, Infinity thought the record would be a major hit. The company paid a substantial fee (which went to charity) to the Catholic Church to obtain exclusive rights to the recording. The album briefly peaked at #126 on the Billboard 200 albums chart; however, it received poor reviews and was quickly seen as a colossal failure. Most of the one million advance copies of the John Paul II album were returned unsold to the label, producing a huge financial loss.

MCA pulled the plug on Infinity in November 1979, and it was immediately absorbed by the parent company. Rupert Holmes, Spyro Gyra and Orleans were the only acts to be retained by MCA, and most of the Infinity label catalog went out of print.

The collapse of Infinity also coincided with rising costs of manufacturing for vinyl LP records and a huge sales slump for the music industry. Infinity has since become known as one of the most expensive failures in the history of the record business.

There are at least two other record labels that also have used the name Infinity Records. One of these other labels was a subsidiary of Festival Records, which for many years was Australia's leading independent record company, but is now also defunct. Other companies with the Infinity Records name do not have an affiliation with MCA.

== Partial list of Infinity Records recording artists ==
- Solomon Burke
- Dixon House Band
- New England
- Robert A. Johnson credited as "Robert Johnson" (a Memphis based Roots rock guitarist, not the famous Blues musician)
- The Kats (signed to the label but had no recordings issued)
- Orsa Lia
- TKO
- Screams
- Hot Chocolate
- Racey
- Rupert Holmes
- Native Sons
- Dobie Gray
- Spyro Gyra
- Orleans

Artists associated with other labels named Infinity Records that are not related to MCA include:

- Richard Batchens
- The Texans (Johnny Burnette and Dorsey Burnette)
- Donald Dempsey
- Giambattista Fedrici
