= On the Line (San Cisco song) =

2020 single by San Cisco

Single by San Cisco

from the album Between You and Me
- Written: 2018–2020
- Released: 21 May 2020
- Recorded: 2018–2020
- Genre: Pop; dream pop
- Length: 5:00
- Label: Island City
- Songwriters: Jordi Davieson; Scarlett Stevens
- Producers: James Ireland; Steve Schram

San Cisco singles chronology
"Flaws" (2020)	"On the Line" (2020)	"Messages" (2020)

Music video
- "On the Line" on YouTube

"On the Line" is a song by Australian indie pop band San Cisco, released on 21 May 2020 as the lead single from their fourth studio album Between You and Me (2020).

== Background and release ==
In a press release, lead guitarist Jordi Davieson discussed the song's origins, stating:

"When do you pull the plug? How do you know if the juice is worth the squeeze? Do you pick up the pieces and move onto something new? Or stick it out for another round of romance? The game of love is never an easy one to play. Like many of the songs from our forthcoming record, "On the Line" has been through many different stages. It almost didn't make it on the record. It wasn't until we revisited it at home from a different angle that everything fell into place and it turned into a gem. We all connect deeply with this song and its sentiment and we think others will too."

== Composition and lyrics ==
Musically, "On the Line" has been described as a pop and dream pop song. Self-described as a "lament disguised as a pop song", the track discusses "the eternal conundrum of whether a love is worth pursuing" and explores "the fragility of a weak relationship".

== Live performances ==
San Cisco performed the track on Australian live music program The Sound on 28 July 2020.

== Critical reception ==
Al Newstead of Triple J described the track as having "that classic San Cisco flair", further noting, "[it has] the contrast of dour lyrics and shiny music that made "Awkward" and "Too Much Time Together" so memorable."

Tyler Jenke of Rolling Stone Australia noted "[it's] one of those songs which hides a far more serious manner than its cheery façade might indicate."

Alex Gallagher of Music Feeds described the track as "warm and jubilant".

Elli Chappelhow of Gigwise thought that San Cisco have "mastered the knack of using earworm tracks and pop hooks to really evoke a mood and feeling", adding that it "[fuses] bright and boppy instrumentals".

Thomas Bleach felt the song was "positive and uplifting" in stark contrast to the lyrical content, and called the guitar riffs "festival ready".

== Music video ==
The music video was directed by Brendan Hutchens and was premiered on Triple J on 21 May 2020, alongside the song's release.

According to Davieson, filming the music video was the first time the band had been together in months. He stated:

"It was such a fun day of filming with a great crew. We were super excited to be able to come out of isolation and join together as a band for the first time in months to shoot this video. We appreciate that at the moment not everyone is as lucky as us here in Western Australia [due to reimposed COVID-19 gathering restrictions], to be able to come together in this way. We really hope that those who can't will be able to reconnect with loved ones safely soon."

=== Synopsis ===
The video depicts the band practicing together, reuniting after COVID-19 gathering restrictions eased in Western Australia.

=== Reception ===
Al Newstead of Triple J and Alex Gallagher of Music Feeds described the music video as "cute" and "very wholesome", respectively. The West Australian's Stephanie McKenna felt the video "marks a welcome departure from the face masks, jigsaws and sourdough bread baking that have become hallmarks of the past months.

== Credits and personnel ==
Adapted from the parent album's liner notes.

San Cisco

- Jordi Davieson – writer, vocals
- Josh Biondillo – guitar, keys
- Scarlett Stevens – drums, vocals

Other musicians

- James Ireland – production
- Steve Schram – production
