= Too Much Time Together =

Single by San Cisco

from the album Gracetown
- Released: February 2015
- Length: 2:49
- Label: San Cisco Music
- Songwriters: Jordi Davieson * Josh Biondillo * Scarlett Stevens * Steven Schram

San Cisco singles chronology
"Run" (2014)	"Too Much Time Together" (2015)	"Magic" (2015)

Music video
- "Too Much Time Together" on YouTube

"Too Much Time Together" is a song recorded by Australian indie pop band San Cisco and released in February 2015 as the second single from their second studio album Gracetown. The song peaked at number 98 in Australia and was certified gold in 2020.

Band member Jordi Davieson said "San Cisco has proximity issues. We thought it would be fun to turn the relationship side of this song on its head, and make it about the band as well as couples. Because we certainly do spend too much time together."

== Reception ==
Meggie Morris from Renowned for Sound thought the song "felt fittingly like a grown-up version of their breakthrough hit "Awkward", revisiting infectious hooks that are both sugary sweet and impressively anthemic." In an album review, Amanda Sherring from Forte Magazine said "'Too Much Time Together' ticks off the jangly guitar and cutesy vocals/lyrics required in all San Cisco releases."

== Charts ==
Chart (2015)	Peak position
Australia (ARIA)	98

== Certifications ==
Region	Certification	Certified units/sales
Australia (ARIA)	Platinum	70,000^{‡}
^{‡} Sales+streaming figures based on certification alone.
