= San Cisco (album) =

Studio album by San Cisco
- Released: 23 November 2012
- Genre: Indie rock, indie pop
- Length: 33:55
- Label: Island City Records, Fat Possum Records, RCA, Sony
- Producer: Steven Schram

San Cisco chronology
Awkward (2012)	San Cisco (2012)	Gracetown (2015)

Singles from San Cisco
- 1. "Wild Things" Released: 5 October 2012; 2. "Beach" Released: December 2012; 3. "Fred Astaire" Released: 25 January 2013

Professional ratings
Review scores
Source	Rating
AllMusic	3.5/5 stars

San Cisco is the debut studio album by the Australian indie rock band San Cisco. It was released in Australia on 23 November 2012 and internationally on 16 July 2013. The album peaked at number 17 on the ARIA Chart.

== Track listing ==
Australian edition
No.	Title	Length
1.	"Beach"	3:40
2.	"Fred Astaire"	2:54
3.	"Hunter"	3:35
4.	"Wild Things"	3:04
5.	"No Friends"	2:11
6.	"Lyall"	2:06
7.	"Metaphors"	2:55
8.	"Mission Failed"	2:59
9.	"Stella"	2:45
10.	"Toast"	2:44
11.	"Nepal"	3:05
12.	"Outro"	1:41
13.	"John's Song" (iTunes bonus track)	3:47
Total length:		33:55

Deluxe edition bonus disc
No.	Title	Length
1.	"Awkward"
2.	"Golden Revolver"
3.	"Rocket Ship"
4.	"Girls Do Cry"

== Charts ==
Chart (2012–13)	Peak position
Australian Albums (ARIA)	17
US Top Heatseekers (Billboard)	16

== Release history ==
Region	Date	Format	Edition(s)	Label	Catalogue
Australia	23 November 2012	CD; 2xCD; digital download	Standard / Deluxe	Island Records	SAN03
Internationally	16 July 2013	CD; LP; digital download	Standard	Fat Possum Records, RCA, Sony Music	88883718172 / LDS1716
