= Between You and Me (San Cisco album) =

Studio album by San Cisco
- Released: 4 September 2020
- Length: 38:27
- Label: Island City
- Producer: San Cisco; Steven Schram; James Ireland

San Cisco chronology
Flaws (2020)	Between You and Me (2020)	Under the Light (2024)

Singles from Between You and Me
- 1. "On the Line" Released: 21 May 2020; 2. "Messages" Released: 10 July 2020; 3. "Alone" Released: 2 September 2020

Professional ratings
Review scores
Source	Rating
AllMusic	4.5/5 stars
The AU Review	3.5/5 stars

Between You and Me is the fourth studio album by the Australian indie rock band San Cisco. It was released on 4 September 2020 and debuted at #3 on the ARIA Albums Chart.

== Track listing ==
Between You and Me track listing
No.	Title	Writer(s)	Producer(s)	Length
1.	"Skin"	San Cisco; Steven Schram	San Cisco; Schram	4:26
2.	"On the Line"	San Cisco; James Ireland; Schram	San Cisco; Ireland	5:00
3.	"Reasons"	San Cisco; Schram	San Cisco; Schram	3:12
4.	"Messages"	San Cisco; Jay Watson; Ireland; Schram	San Cisco; Schram	3:19
5.	"Shine"	San Cisco; Ireland; Schram	San Cisco; Ireland	2:34
6.	"Alone"	San Cisco; Schram	San Cisco; Schram	3:39
7.	"When I Dream"	San Cisco; Schram	San Cisco; Schram	3:11
8.	"Gone"	San Cisco; Schram	San Cisco; Schram	3:06
9.	"Flaws"	San Cisco; Schram	San Cisco; Schram	3:43
10.	"Tell Me When You Leave Tonight"	San Cisco; Schram	San Cisco; Schram	3:28
11.	"Between You and Me"	San Cisco	San Cisco; Schram	2:49
Total length:				38:27

== Personnel ==
Adapted from the album's liner notes.

=== Musicians ===
San Cisco

- Jordi Davieson – lead vocals (1–3, 5–11), backing vocals (4), organ & glockenspiel (3, 11), acoustic guitar (7, 9, 11)
- Josh Biondillo – guitar, bass, piano, synthesizer, organ, acoustic guitar (1–11)
- Scarlett Stevens – drums & percussion (1–11), lead vocals (2, 4), backing vocals (1–3, 5, 7, 8, 11), bass synth (6)

Other musicians

- Steve Schram – bass (1, 4, 6, 7–9), keys (4, 7, 8), bass synth (6), guitars (7, 8, 11)
- James Ireland – keys (2, 4, 5), percussion (2, 5)
- Mitchell Benson – bass (2, 5)
- Jennifer Aslett – backing vocals (7)

=== Technical ===
- San Cisco – production, engineering
- Steven Schram – production (1, 3, 4, 6–11), mixing (6–11), engineering
- James Ireland – mixing (1, 2, 5), production (2, 5), engineering (1, 2, 5)
- Broderick Madden-Scott – mixing, engineering (1)
- Chris Coady – mixing (3, 4)
- Adam Ayan – mastering (1–11)
- Toni Wilkinson – photography
- Pooneh Ghana – photography
- Jeffrey Annert – artwork & design

== Charts ==
Chart performance for Between You and Me
Chart (2020)	Peak position
Australian Albums (ARIA)	3
