= Messages (San Cisco song) =

2020 single by San Cisco

Single by San Cisco

from the album Between You and Me
- Written: 2018–2020
- Released: 10 July 2020
- Recorded: 2018–2020
- Genre: Disco; pop
- Length: 3:19
- Label: Island City Records
- Songwriter(s): Jordi Davieson; Scarlett Stevens
- Producer(s): James Ireland; Steve Schram

San Cisco singles chronology
"On the Line" (2020)	"Messages" (2020)	"Alone" (2020)

"Messages" is a song by Australian indie pop band San Cisco, released on 10 July 2020 as the second single from their fourth studio album Between You and Me (2020).

== Background and release ==
"Messages" was released on 10 July 2020, alongside the announcement of San Cisco's fourth studio album Between You and Me. Lead vocalist Jordi Davieson said of the song in a press release:

""Messages" is a tongue-in-cheek bop about shitty friends. Originally the lyrics were loosely inspired by my frustration with [drummer] Scarlett never replying to my messages, but when we decided the track would be much better with her singing vocals instead, she added in a few of her annoyances about me. It turned into quite a constructive process for our friendship! She still never replies to messages..."

== Composition and lyrics ==
Gigwise described the song as having "eighties synth [which] mingles with disco bass and splashy percussion" and "bittersweet" lyrics, whilst music critic Thomas Bleach noted the song as having a "pop aesthetic". The lyrics "explore the annoyances of shitty friendships and highlights the frustrating reality of being left on read."

== Critical reception ==
Al Newstead of Triple J labelled the song "another upbeat pop".

Jessie Atkinson of Gigwise described the song as a "bubblegum new cut", further stating "evokes the feeling of going out on the town even when you're feeling a bit down in the dumps."

Thomas Bleach called the song a "short and punchy pop track", additionally describing it as a "playful concept... executed in a really upbeat fashion."

== Music video ==
The music video was released on 9 July 2020 and was directed by Duncan Wright.

=== Synopsis ===
The music video depicts the band "performing at a dance with clips of drummer and singer Scarlett Stevens chatting on a lips designed phone whilst doing things like working out.

=== Reception ===
Gigwise praised the music video as a "total Austin Powers affair: all lemon yellow décor, hotpants and lip phones." Triple J's Al Newstead labelled it a "cracking" video. ColoRising found the set to be "vibrantly designed" and "clever", saying it gives the video a "fun and cheeky appeal".

== Track listings ==
Digital download
No.	Title	Writer(s)	Length
1.	"Messages"	Jordi Davieson; Scarlett Stevens	3:19

Album release
No.	Title	Writer(s)	Length
4.	"Messages"	Davieson; Stevens	3:19

== Credits and personnel ==
Adapted from the parent album's liner notes.

San Cisco

- Jordi Davieson – writer, vocals
- Josh Biondillo – guitar, keys
- Scarlett Stevens – drums, vocals

Other musicians

- James Ireland – production
- Steve Schram – production
