= Flashbang (disambiguation) =

A flashbang is a stun grenade.

Flashbang may also refer to:

- "Flashbang", a 2012 single by Jewelz & Sparks
- "Flashbang", a song by San Cisco from the 2015 album Gracetown
- Flashbang Productions, a media company co-founded by Michael Lange
- Flashbang, a fictional character in 2023 TV series The Artful Dodger
- Vincent de Moor, a Dutch trance artist also known as Flashbang

== See also ==
- Artillery sound ranging
