= Brauer College =

Location
- Warrnambool, Victoria; Australia; 38°21′31″S 142°27′34″E

Information
- Type: Government co-educational secondary
- Established: 1911 (As Warrnambool Technical School)
- Principal: Sean Fitzpatrick (2024)
- Grades: 7–12
- Enrolment: 850
- Colours: Green, white and maroon
- Website: brauer.vic.edu.au

Brauer College is a government secondary school, located in Warrnambool, Victoria, Australia.

Originally established as Warrnambool Technical School in 1911, the school was renamed Brauer College at the beginning of 1990 (after noted 20th-century Warrnambool doctor, Alfred Brauer), to reflect its change from a technical institution into a more mainstream college. Brauer has since developed into a large secondary school with an enrolment of approximately 850 students ranging from years 7 to 12.

Sean Fitzpatrick is the current school principal, as of 2024.

== Campuses ==
Brauer's main campus is located on Carumut Road, towards the outskirts of Warrnambool's urban area. The school features a state of the art performing arts centre and gymnasium, as well as extensive classroom and other facilities including a driver education track and supergrass tennis courts. In 2007 the library and science wing were refurbished in addition to the construction of the Australian Technical College Warrnambool campus. Directly north of the school, a multimillion-dollar sports facility known as Brauerander Park has been built. The park features an athletics track as well as planned facilities for field events, soccer & AFL football fields and a 3-hole golf course. The track was completed in mid-May 2007 and was officially opened by the Victorian Governor, Professor David de Kretser in September 2007.

Dunkeld Annexe

The Dunkeld Annexe is a Brauer owned facility located in Dunkeld, in the southern Grampians, used for the purpose of school camps. Years 7 and 8 camping trips take place here.

== Controversies ==
=== "Two brick rule" ===
In 2007, the college received extended media attention regarding its unique "two brick rule". The rule, which stated that students of the opposite sex could not come within two brick lengths of each other, was designed to eliminate greetings such as hugging, for fear that this might lead to sexual contact.

=== Misandry Incident ===
The college received widespread media attention in March 2021 after it required male students, as young as 12, to stand during a school assembly and apologise on behalf of their gender for any past sexual behaviour that may have caused offence to the female teachers and female students around them. This caused a backlash from parents who reported that their sons were upset and confused as to why boys and young men were assumed to be bad people.

Jane Boyle, the school's principal, resisted calls to resign but later issued an apology, admitting that although the assembly was "well intended", requiring the boys to stand up and apologise was unwarranted. She did not however, accept responsibility for violating school policy and in her apology was largely indifferent to the harm done to the school community.

== Industry Education Centre (formerly Australian Technical College Warrnambool) ==
In 2006, Brauer in partnership with Baimbridge College Hamiltion won the tender for the Australian Technical College in Warrnambool. Commencing its programs at the beginning of 2007, the ATCW offers courses in commercial cookery, mechanics, engineering, metal fabrication and carpentry.

Following the federal election of Kevin Rudd and the ALP to power in 2007, the ATC project was discontinued. As the ATC Warrnambool campus was one of the few finished colleges in the state, it remained operational in various states until in 2009 it became the Industry Education Centre, jointly operated by South West Institute of TAFE, Brauer College & other local school and employment agency bodies.

== Alumni ==
- Tom Ballard and Alex Dyson, radio presenters
- Ben Barber, actor
- Marc Leishman, golfer
- Jordan Lewis, AFL footballer
- Brent Moloney, AFL footballer
- Kathryn Ross, Australian rower
- Justin Street, musician

== Other information ==
- Past principals include Duncan Stalker OAM who was principal from 1978–2001 as well as being president of the Australian Schools Principals Association throughout the late nineties. Stalker is now head of the Brauerander Trust, responsible for the development and construction of Brauerander Park.
- The school's first principal was John King. One of Brauer's most prestigious awards, the John King Citizenship Award, is named in his honour and is awarded to only a handful of students each year who demonstrate exceptional citizenship, leadership and academic/sporting endeavours.
- Years 7, 8 and 9 camps take place at the school's Dunkeld camp, while at year 10 students have the option of going on a skiing trip to the Victorian Alps, and one of two major central Australia/east coast trips in year 11.
- The school's LOTE program is Japanese, with several trips to Miura (Warrnambool's sister city) and Fukuoka taking place each year.
- Additionally, the school also offers an annual trip to China, and a biannual trip to India where a boys' cricket team take on Daly College in an annual exchange program.
- Brauer is host to approximately 20 exchange students from Japan, China, South Korea, Germany, Switzerland, Sweden and Sudan.
- Students participate annually in the Australian Geography, English, Writing, Mathematics, Science and Information Technology competitions as well as other competitions such as Tournament of Minds.
