= Rock It (music festival) =

Australian music festival held near Perth

- March 2005 poster
- Genre: Rock music & Alternative rock
- Dates: Various
- Locations: Arena Joondalup, Perth, Western Australia
- Years active: 1999 - 2000; 2002 - 2006; 2009; 2012
- Organiser: Heatseeker
- Website: Official website

Rock It is an Australian music festival held at the Arena Joondalup in the northern suburbs of Perth, Western Australia. The festival was first held in 1999, and mainly features modern rock music. Along with the nationally-touring Big Day Out, Rock It was one of the major rock concerts held regularly in Perth.

At the March 2009 event Western Australian Police trialled the use of drug amnesty bins for the first time at a rock concert. The police restrictions resulted in long queues on entry and due to their public visibility little use by concert goers.

== Artist lineups by year ==
=== 1999 ===
5 December 1999

- Silverchair
- Powderfinger
- Beaverloop
- John Butler Trio
- Killing Heidi
- Jebediah
- Test Eagles
- Auto Pilot
- DJ Kingsize
- Kenny Bartley
- DJ Betamax
- DJ Dr Love
- Fourstroke

=== 2000 ===
22 October 2000

- Green Day
- Powderfinger
- Grinspoon
- 28 Days
- Shihad
- John Butler Trio
- Weta

=== 2002 ===
13 October 2002

- Grinspoon
- John Butler Trio
- Pacifier
- Machine Gun Fellatio
- Motorace
- Bodyjar
- Superheist
- The Fergusons
- Spencer Tracy

=== 2003 ===
23 November 2003

- Jack Johnson
- Powderfinger
- The Living End
- John Butler Trio
- Magic Dirt
- Gyroscope
- Downsyde

=== 2004 ===
14 March 2004

- Grinspoon
- Pacifier
- Resin Dogs
- Bodyjar
- The Butterfly Effect
- Brand New
- After the Fall
- The Flairz

Blink-182 was scheduled, but cancelled due to drummer Travis Barker breaking an ankle.

24 October 2004

- Jet
- The Living End
- Spiderbait
- Hilltop Hoods
- Jebediah
- 28 Days
- Rocket Science
- The Casanovas
- Dallas Crane
- Cooker and Love
- Ground Components

This festival, featuring an all-Australian line up, was the first Rock It to sell out.

=== 2005 ===
13 March 2005

- Green Day (As part of the American Idiot World Tour)
- Grinspoon
- Simple Plan
- Shihad
- Frenzal Rhomb
- End of Fashion
- Little Birdy
- Scribe
- The Spazzys
- The Flairz
- Faker
- Day of the Dead
- Mr Sandman
- The Fuzz

4 December 2005

- Foo Fighters
- Oasis
- Spiderbait
- Wolfmother
- Kaiser Chiefs
- Gyroscope
- Karnivool
- The Pictures

=== 2006 ===
19 March 2006

- Silverchair
- Grinspoon
- Shihad
- Cog
- Butterfingers
- Faker
- After the Fall
- The Hot Lies
- Snowman
- Katalyst
- Koolism
- Fdel
- Ru.C.L.
- Nathan J

=== 2009 ===
8 March 2009

- Kings of Leon
- The Fratellis
- The Music
- Birds of Tokyo
- Faker
- The Stills
- Sparkadia
- Sugar Army
- Bob Log III
- The Devil
- Abbe May

=== 2012 ===
28 October 2012

- The Black Keys
- John Butler Trio
- Birds of Tokyo
- The Panics
- Lanie Lane
- Last Dinosaurs
- San Cisco
- The Kill Devil Hills
- Abbe May
- Royal Headache
- Graveyard Train
- Brothers Grim
- The Toot Toot Toots
- Emperors

== Spin-off events ==
=== Blackjack 2007 ===
The 2007 event renamed Blackjack 2007 as Arena Joondalup was unable to host the event, so the festival was held at the Claremont Showground on 5 April 2007.

- The Pixies
- The Living End
- Eskimo Joe
- Gnarls Barkley
- The Vines
- Birds of Tokyo
- Children Collide

=== On the Bright Side festival ===
On the Bright Side is an annual Australian music festival held in Perth. Inaugurated in 2010, the event is the result of collaboration between the promoters of Splendour in the Grass, held in Woodford, Queensland, and Rock It. In 2012, the festival was cancelled due to "conflicting artist schedules".
