= The Water (San Cisco album) =

Studio album by San Cisco
- Released: 5 May 2017
- Genre: Indie rock; indie pop
- Length: 35:49
- Label: Island City Records
- Producer: Josh Biondillo, Jordi Davieson, Steven Schram

San Cisco chronology
Gracetown (2015)	The Water (2017)	Flaws (2020)

Singles from The Water
- 1. "SloMo" Released: October 2016; 2. "Hey, Did I Do You Wrong?" Released: March 2017; 3. "The Distance" Released: September 2017

Professional ratings
Review scores
Source	Rating
AllMusic	3/5 stars

The Water is the third studio album by the Australian indie rock band San Cisco. It was released on 5 May 2017. The album peaked at number 17 on the ARIA Chart.

== Track listing ==
All tracks are written by Jordi Davieson, Josh Biondillo, Scarlett Stevens and Steven Schram.

No.	Title	Length
1.	"Kids are Cool"	2:49
2.	"Sunrise"	3:50
3.	"That Boy"	3:16
4.	"The Distance"	3:51
5.	"Hey, Did I Do You Wrong?"	3:04
6.	"Waiting For the Weekend"	3:46
7.	"SloMo"	2:48
8.	"The Water"	3:41
9.	"Did You Get What You Came For"	3:57
10.	"Make Me Electrify"	4:43
Total length:		35:49

== Charts ==
Chart (2017)	Peak position
Australian Albums (ARIA)	17

== Release history ==
Region	Date	Format	Label	Catalogue
Australia	5 May 2017	CD; LP; digital download; streaming	Island Records	SAN05
