= Familiar Stranger (Bob Evans album) =

Studio album by Bob Evans
- Released: 15 March 2013
- Recorded: August–October 2012, Sing Sing Studios, Richmond
- Genres: Alt country, rock, indie pop
- Length: 49:46
- Label: EMI
- Producer: Dean Reid

Bob Evans chronology
Goodnight, Bull Creek! (2009)	Familiar Stranger (2013)

Singles from Familiar Stranger
- 1. "Don't Wanna Grow Up Anymore" Released: 26 October 2012; 2. "Go" Released: 7 February 2013

Familiar Stranger is the fourth solo studio album by Australian indie pop artist, Kevin Mitchell, which was released on 15 March 2013 under his stage name, Bob Evans. It peaked at No. 31 on the ARIA Albums Chart. Familiar Stranger was produced by Dean Reid for EMI and provided two singles, "Don't Wanna Grow Up Anymore" (October 2012) and "Go" (February 2013).

== Background ==
Familiar Stranger is the fourth solo album released on 15 March 2013 by Bob Evans, which is the stage name of Mitchell. Mitchell is also the founding mainstay vocalist and rhythm guitarist for Jebediah, an Australian alternative rock group. They had issued their fifth studio album, Kosciuszko, on 15 April 2011. By mid-2012, following touring as a member of Jedediah in support of Kosciuzko, Mitchell had commenced work for his fourth Bob Evans album, Familiar Stranger. Mitchell wrote about 40 tracks to select from, for the album.

With his wife, Kristen, he had become a parent for the first time; he explained to Kathy McCabe of Herald Sun newspaper: "I was very determined not to overdo that side of things. There is a song there, but you wouldn't necessarily know it's about my baby." In the same interview, her stated: "This time, for the first time, I put the songs in order before we started recording and kept that order in mind because I wanted to make a soundtrack to the movie in my brain." In August 2012 Mitchell entered the recording studio for that album.

On 15 October 2012 Mitchell appeared on national radio station, Triple J, on Breakfast with Tom and Alex, to showcase "Don't Wanna Grow Up Anymore". He revealed that Joey Waronker (of Atoms for Peace, Beck's backing band) had played drums on the album. Dean Reid (Marina and the Diamonds, Mystery Jets) produced the album, which was recorded at Sing Sing Studios in Richmond, where Jebediah had made their first two albums. Reid also contributed guitar, keyboards and programming.

A music video for the lead single, "Don't Wanna Grow Up Anymore", was released on 26 October and premiered on the Channel V programme, WTF. It was directed by Darcy Prendergast for his Melbourne-based company, Oh Yeah Wow. Prendergast took footage of Mitchell during the recording process. Prendergast has been involved with projects for other artists, including Eskimo Joe and British India. Mitchell explained to McCabe that the video was inspired by one made for the Smashing Pumpkins song "1979".

Mitchell revealed in an interview with Denham Sadler of Tone Deaf, in January 2013, that Familiar Stranger is a progression beyond what can be heard in his previous work: "I don't sit and listen to alt-country and folk music all day anymore… if I had made another record with the same sort of musical pallet as the last two I would have been forcing it." Mitchell further explained that Goldfrapp, Santigold, Wilco and Spoon were some of his musical interests during its development. On 25 January he announced that a limited number of vinyl copies would be released, "I love vinyl. I love smelling it the first time its unsheathed from its wrapper. I love the sound the needle makes as it goes around and around." Triple J announcer, Richard Kingsmill, previewed Familiar Stranger on 3 February.

Filming of the album's second music video, for the second single, "Go", occurred on 4 February 2013. The track features backing vocals from Scarlett Stevens of the Perth indie band, San Cisco. Its music video was presented on the BobEvansMusic's YouTube channel on 7 February. It includes a cameo appearance by Tim Rogers, who portrays the cool nemesis of Mitchell's goofy and unlucky character. Some filming occurred at Altona Beach in the western Melbourne suburb of that name with Prendergast's Oh Yeah Wow company again. Mitchell revealed:

Spent all day at the beach shooting the video for "Go" today and I am exhausted and have sunburn for the first time in years. I wasn't really built for the beach. Still, I'm hoping that very fact will result in some humorous footage. I spent a good portion of the day laughing so hopefully you guys will too when you see it in the next few weeks.

Following the "Go" music video, Mitchell released a video parody, "Bob Evans' Big Pre-album interview", to promote Familiar Stranger. He explained in a radio interview on 18 February 2013 that, while the previous two albums are "Nashville-sounding", for Familiar Stranger he sought to "make a record that sounded like an awesome version of my garage." Mitchell also used a guest singer, Dune (pseudonym for Jade McRae). Mitchell stated that the album was about his "recent run ins with the universe, taking away and giving back." For further promotion, a live version of a track, "Wonderful You", was aired on the Bob Evans YouTube channel in early March.

On 13 March 2013, two days prior to its physical release, it was streamed on the FasterLouder website—in an accompanying article, Tom Mann reported:

Familiar Stranger was recorded at Sing Sing Studios in Melbourne throughout 2012 and was mixed by Scott Horscroft (Empire of the Sun, The Sleepy Jackson) and Tony Buchen (Bluejuice, Phrase) who also played bass. Atoms for Peace and Ultraista drummer Joey Waronker, who has played with Beck, Air, Paul McCartney and The Smashing Pumpkins, was invited to play drums on the album and made the trip especially to Melbourne for the recording.

Also in March, during an interview for Drive on ABC Radio National, Mitchell described how fellow Jebediah members "kind of put up with him [Bob Evans]; they tolerate him. Ahh ... You know, I think they understand why he's around, and why he needs to do what he does ... but sometimes I think they look at him with a sort of sense of bemusement." In reference to Jebediah members' extraneous musical activities, Mitchell explained that "they 'moonlight' in other local Perth outfits."

He explained in an AU Review interview with Chloe Webb that his fourth solo album was intended as a complete departure from previous work as Bob Evans and that, while the previous two albums had a more organic feel due to the recording environment, Familiar Stranger embraced a "more synthetic background." He affirmed: "I feel I have both feet firmly planted with that new direction and I’m really satisfied with that feeling."

== Reception ==
Professional ratings
Review scores
Source	Rating
The AU Review	9.1 stars on a 10 point scale
Charter	(positive)
FasterLouder	7/10 stars
Music Feeds	(positive)
TheMusic.com.au	(positive)
Watch Out For.com.au	(positive)

Familiar Stranger peaked at No. 31 on the ARIA Albums Chart. It provided two singles, "Don't Wanna Grow Up Anymore" (October 2012) and "Go" (February 2013), but neither reached the top 100 on the related ARIA Singles Chart.

Jenni Kauppi, writing for The AU Review, rated Familiar Stranger as "9.1 out of 10", stating that "Evans’ songwriting, forming the spinal column of the album, is as strong as ever, so while the production here is front and centre, a quintessentially gen-Y sound, it's bona fide Evans." Watch Out For.com.au's review by Chris Wood contends that Mitchell's voice is used more as an instrument on the fourth album. Wood also states that it consists of "the right balance of futuristic folk pop", and concludes: "Overall, Familiar Stranger is not completely immediate; it will definitely take a few rotations to ‘get on board’, so to speak."

The album received the attention of Charter, the monthly flagship publication of the Institute of Chartered Accountants in Australia, where it was reviewed by Andy McLean in February 2013. McLean praised it, comparing the music to Teenage Fanclub and Big Star, and concluded by asserting that "Mitchell has embraced his maturity and turned it into an advantage". Writing for the Australian music website TheMusic.com.au, Paul Barbieri distinguished it from previous Bob Evans work by highlighting the more substantial production values. Barbieri generally praised the album although "Some of the later tracks, like the almost six-minute '[Nothing's Gonna Save Us] From Ourselves', seem to plod a little, but this is a minor gripe for what’s otherwise a great leap forward."

== Track listing ==
All tracks are written by Kevin Edward Mitchell

No.	Title	Length
1.	"Footscray Park"	5:11
2.	"Maps"	4:37
3.	"Bruises"	4:17
4.	"Don't Wanna Grow Up Anymore"	4:26
5.	"Sitting in the Waiting Room"	3:52
6.	"Getting It Together"	3:29
7.	"To Let You Down"	3:48
8.	"In Another Time"	4:06
9.	"Go"	3:47
10.	"Nothing's Gonna Save Us from Ourselves"	5:46
11.	"What Else Is There?"	3:32
12.	"Wonderful You"	2:55

== Personnel ==
Musicians

- Bob Evans (a.k.a. Kevin Mitchell): lead vocals, acoustic guitar
- Tony Buchen: bass guitar
- Dune (a.k.a. Jade MacRae): guest vocals
- Davey Lane: bass guitar
- Louis Macklin: keyboards
- Dean Reid: guitar, keyboards, programming
- Scarlett Stevens: backing vocals ("Go")
- Joey Waronker: drums

Recording details

- Tony Buchen: mixer
- Scott Horscroft: mixer
- Dean Reid: producer
- Matthew Neighbour: engineer
- Sing Sing Studios: recording, mixing

== Album tour ==
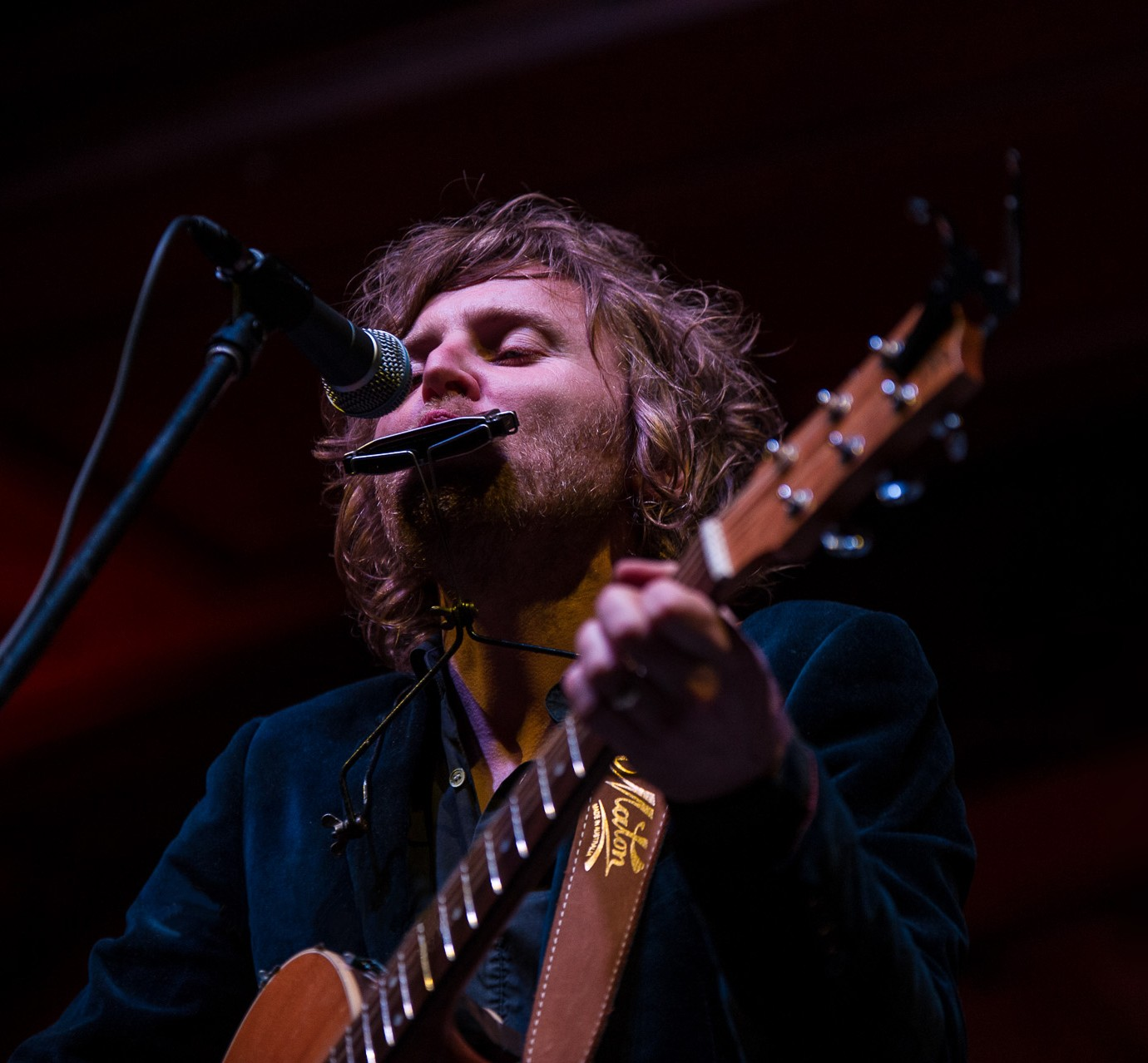
Bob Evans (a.k.a. Kevin Mitchell), The Abbey, Canberra, September 2013

For a national tour in support of Familiar Stranger Bob Evans' backing band were Tony Buchen on bass guitar, Malcolm Clark on drums (of The Sleepy Jackson), James Fleming on keyboards and Davey Lane on lead guitar (of You Am I), who had provided bass guitar on the album. He told Leah-Marie Roqueza of Music Feeds, "I'm definitely surrounding myself with a bit of an all-star band, which I'm really excited about." The support acts were Lane as a solo artist, and Tigertown. Initially he toured nationally from April to May 2013, a second regional tour of east coast venues followed in August to September.
