= Tom Ballard (comedian) =

Australian comedian, radio and television presenter

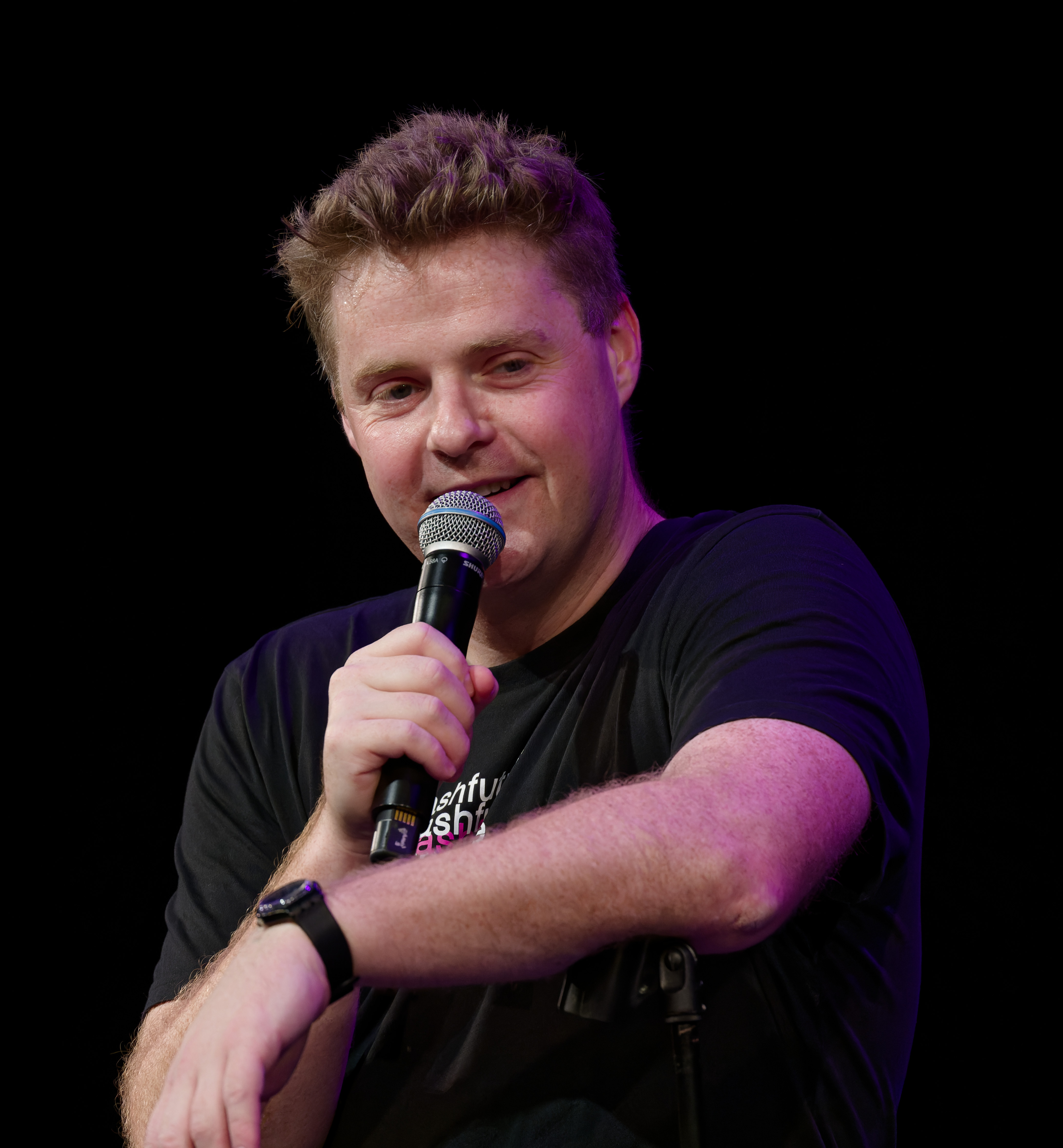
- Ballard at the 2024 Edinburgh Festival Fringe
- Born: Thomas Colin Ballard; 26 November 1989 (age 36); Warrnambool, Victoria, Australia
- Occupations: Comedian; radio presenter; television presenter
- Political party: Australian Greens
- Awards: Helpmann Award for Best Comedy Performer (2016)

Thomas Colin Ballard (born 26 November 1989) is an Australian comedian, broadcaster, actor, and writer. Starting out in radio, he became known as a Triple J host, along with his friend Alex Dyson, over seven years with the station. He is known for his stand-up comedy, as a host of podcasts, and as television presenter, such as the 2017 ABC Television comedy show Tonightly with Tom Ballard. He is author of the 2022 book I, Millennial: One Snowflake's Screed Against Boomers, Billionaires and Everything Else.

== Early life and education ==
Thomas Colin Ballard was born in 1989 in Warrnambool, Victoria, and grew up there.

He attended Brauer Secondary College, graduating in 2007 as School Captain and Dux and achieving an Equivalent National Tertiary Entrance Rank of 99.80 in his Victorian Certificate of Education (VCE). In 2006, when he was still at school, he submitted an essay to the Castan Centre for Human Rights Law at Monash University, titled "We Have More to Fear From the State than From Terrorists: Who's Afraid of Terrorism?", which won its 2006 Human Writes Essay Competition, open to all year 11 and 12 students across Victoria. Also while at school, he won the Victorian plain English speaking competition; was presenting regularly on Triple J radio; was one of a school team which won the Apex Australian national debating final; was chosen to attend the National Schools Constitutional Convention in Canberra; as one of a team of three won the national mooting championship; and, after selection as one of the top theatre students in Victoria, performed in Top Acts at a local theatre. During his VCE year, Ballard competed in and won the VCAA's Plain English Speaking Award with a speech titled "bullying.com". He went on to place second in the national competition to Daniel Swain, with the two being chosen to represent Australia in the International Public Speaking Competition held in London in May 2008. He was also awarded the VCAA's 2007 VCE Achiever's Award. His success in the public speaking competition and his activism with school and local youth communities on topics such as anti-homosexuality and cyberbullying helped earn him the Achiever's Award.

After leaving school, he had wanted to become an actor, and applied to do a bachelor of dramatic art at the Victorian College of the Arts, but missed out on a place in the first round. He moved to Melbourne studied law at Monash University for around six weeks, but found his life too busy, after presenting his debut solo show at the Comedy Festival as well as presenting on radio.

== Career ==
=== Stand-up comedy ===
Ballard was a three-time Class Clowns national finalist in the Melbourne International Comedy Festival, and a Raw Comedy national finalist by 2006. He performed across Victoria as part of the Young Blood Comedy Tour in 2007, and had a guest spot in the 2007 Melbourne International Comedy Festival's Eskimo Jokes show. He also performed in the 2008 Comedy Festival as part of the Comedy Zone, as one of the "stars of the future" (along with Jacques Barrett, Lila Tillman, and Jack Druce).

Ballard performed his first stand-up show in 2009, entitled Tom Ballard Is What He Is, "about growing up and coming out in regional Victoria. He has performed stand-up in festivals, on television, and on tours around the country, including at Pridefest WA in Perth, Western Australia in 2012.

In 2015, he toured his show Taxis & Rainbows & Hatred, which he based on a 2013 homophobic incident directed at him in a taxi in Newcastle, around various comedy festivals, including the Edinburgh Festival Fringe. He went by invitation to the Just for Laughs festival in Montreal, Canada, where he performed alongside Wanda Sykes and Jimmy Carr. He returned the following year, and participated in Comedy Central Roast and performed on LOL Live, presented by Kevin Hart.

Among other awards, Ballard won the Helpmann Award for Best Comedy Performer in 2016, for The World Keeps Happening.

In 2017, his show Problematic was one of three best-reviewed shows at the Edinburgh Fringe.

=== Radio ===
Ballard was a presenter for Warrnambool's 3WAY FM community radio station with Alex Dyson.

After being noticed in the Raw Comedy event, Ballard and Dyson were recruited by Triple J to host the midnight to dawn show, then the weekday summer lunch slot (10 am to 2 pm), from 2009, the breakfast show (6 am to 10 am). In November 2013, Ballard resigned from Triple J after seven years with the station, to focus on his stand-up comedy.

He has since made various appearances on radio, including as a guest host on Nazeem Hussain Heals the World on Triple J in 2015, and on 2Day FM's Breakfast with Rove and Sam in 2016.

=== Television ===
==== As host or actor ====
In 2014, Ballard hosted Reality Check, a panel discussion program about reality television. He guest-hosted on Q&A twice in 2015.

In 2017, Ballard was appointed host of news and culture TV program on ABC Comedy, Tonightly with Tom Ballard. The show was dropped from the ABC line-up and aired for the last time on 7 September 2018, following an ABC review which determined the show failed to meet a quality threshold.

Ballard appeared on an early episode of interview show "Nude with Nish" where Nish Kumar exclaimed "that man hangs dong!". In later series Ballard presented a news segment where he would "take his dong wherever the news is from" and report live on scene. Nish would then rate the news on a scale of flaccid to fully tumescent.

He was cast in Deadloch (released June 2023 on Amazon Prime Video) as Sven Alderman, a well-meaning but simple gay police officer.

==== Appearances as self ====
Ballard has also appeared on The Project, Spicks and Specks, It's a Date, Celebrity Name Game, Show Me the Movie!, Hughesy, We Have a Problem, Patriot Brains (2021), and Celebrity Mastermind (2020). In 2024, he was a contestant on the Australian show Guy Montgomery's Guy Mont-Spelling Bee.

In 2016, Ballard was cast in the second season of SBS reality show/documentary series First Contact.

==== Podcasts ====
Ballard wrote and broadcast the podcast Like I'm A Six-Year-Old for eight years, from around 2015 until May 2023.

As of 2024 Ballard co-hosts the left-leaning political podcast Serious Danger, with Emerald Moon, "about our broken political system and its greatest threat, the Australian Greens". The 100th episode was performed live in Melbourne on 18 November 2023.

==== Writing ====
Apart from comedy written to be performed live, Ballard has written for The Warrnambool Standard, Good Weekend, Triple J magazine, Guardian Australia, The Sydney Morning Herald, Junkee, and Fairfax Online.

He also wrote a humorous but scathing critique of neoliberalism and its impact on the economy and politics of Australia, a book called I, Millennial: One Snowflake's Screed Against Boomers, Billionaires and Everything Else, published in 2022.

== Political views and advocacy ==
Ballard is politically left-leaning. He endorsed the Victorian Socialists for the 2018 Victorian state election. In a 2020 tweet he revealed that he was a member of the Australian Greens.

In 2012, Ballard published "My Letter to Miranda Devine" in which he strongly criticised Devine for writing that "the ideal situation for a child to be raised in is an intact family with a father and a mother". Ballard has been a vocal critic of Australian Government policy towards asylum seekers. In 2016, Ballard signed an open letter to the editors of The Australian newspaper condemning that paper's decision to publish a Bill Leak cartoon depicting a neglectful Aboriginal father.

In 2017, Ballard campaigned for marriage equality ahead of the same-sex marriage plebiscite in Australia. In 2018, a senior ABC executive apologised to Australian Conservatives candidate Kevin Bailey after he was labelled a "cunt" on Ballard's Tonightly program.

== Personal life ==
Ballard is gay. Ballard describes himself as "gay Gen Y middle-class public school-educated son of left-leaning-parents." He is an atheist and critic of religion.

He and comedian Josh Thomas were each other's first boyfriend. As their two-and-a-half-year relationship was ending in 2010, Thomas was on tour with his show Surprise, "all about being young, gay and in love for the first time". Ballard premiered his show, Since 1989, at the Belvoir St Theatre the following year. Dealing with his childhood and first relationship, and largely written prior to the break-up, Ballard described the experience as giving him "an element of closure".

As of 2024 his partner is Harley, whom he met in early 2020. He has a fixie road bike, and has never owned a car.

=== Sexual assault allegation ===
In June 2014, Adelaide comedian JooYung Roberts reported to the South Australia Police that Ballard had allegedly sexually assaulted him in a hotel room after a comedy show, but the police had told him that the actions he had reported had been within the law. Inspired by the #metoo movement, in December 2017 Roberts reported the matter to SAPOL again, who re-investigated and said that it had been finalised. Roberts identified himself by describing the incident on his Facebook page, in which he said that after striking up a conversation at the hotel bar, Ballard invited Roberts, then 20 years old, up to his hotel room then kissed him and placed his hand on his (Ballard's) penis. He said that it had been "a traumatising experience for many reasons, one of those being I'm a heterosexual". In response, Ballard released a statement on his website denying the allegation "in the strongest terms possible" and insisting the encounter was consensual. He said he had only become aware of the claim that the sexual interaction was not consensual around six months earlier. Ballard said the allegation had caused distress to him as well as his family and friends, affecting his work and his mental health, stating: "I abhor sexual assault and sexual violence. I absolutely support the philosophy of the #MeToo movement. I believe in supporting victims and ensuring those who have done wrong face justice. But I have not done anything wrong."

== Filmography ==
Year	Title	Role	Notes
2008	Push Up	Michael	
2009	Shiny Thing	Lochlan Duffy	
2014	It's a Date	Mark	1 episode
2015	Fully Furnished	Dayne	
2020	Stamptown Comedy Night	Tommy Tucks	
2023	Deadloch	Sven Alderman	8 episodes
2024	Fisk	Stefan	2 episodes
2025	Claire Hooper's House Of Games	Self	5 episodes

== Discography ==
=== Albums ===
List of albums
Title	Album details
The Bits We're Least Ashamed of (with Alex)	Released: April 2013; Label: ABC, UMA (3713506); Formats: CD, download
Tonightly Album	Released: October 2018; Label: ABC; Formats: download

== Awards and nominations ==
Ballard has won two ARIA Music Awards, a set of annual ceremonies presented by Australian Recording Industry Association (ARIA).

Year	Nominee / work	Award	Result	Ref.
2013	The Bits We're Least Ashamed of (with Alex Dyson)	ARIA Award for Best Comedy Release	Won	
2018	"Sex Pest" (with Bridie and Wyatt)	ARIA Award for Best Comedy Release	Won	

Other awards and nominations include:

- National finalist, Raw Comedy
- Nominated, Golden Gibbo Award
- 2009: Winner, MICF Best Newcomer Award, for Tom Ballard Is What He Is (youngest ever recipient)
- 2015: Nominated, Best Newcomer Award at the Edinburgh Fringe, for Taxis & Rainbows & Hatred
- 2016: Winner, Helpmann Award for Best Comedy Performer, for The World Keeps Happening
- 2016: Inaugural winner of the Pinder Prize (named in honour of comedy producer John Pinder)
- 2016: Nominated, Barry Award for Most Outstanding Show at MICF, for his body of work
- 2016: Nominated, Best Comedy at the Edinburgh Fringe, for The World Keeps Happening
- 2017: Winner, Best Australian Show Award at the Sydney Comedy Festival, for Problematic
- 2022: Nominated, AACTA Award for Best Stand-Up Special, for Enough

== Publications ==
- Ballard, T. (2022). I, Millennial: One Snowflake's Screed Against Boomers, Billionaires and Everything Else. Simon & Schuster Australia. ISBN 978-1-76110-064-2.
