= Under the Light (album) =

Studio album by San Cisco
- Released: 1 March 2024
- Studio: Sunlight (Fremantle); Honeymoon Suite (Los Angeles); Green Room (Fremantle); The Milton (Los Angeles)
- Length: 38:10
- Label: Island City
- Producer: San Cisco; James Ireland

San Cisco chronology
| Between You and Me (2020) | Under the Light (2024) |

Singles from Under the Light
- 1. "Lost Without You" Released: 24 February 2023"; 2. "Horoscope" Released: 7 April 2023; 3. "Honeycomb" Released: 19 May 2023; 4. "Under the Light" Released: 11 August 2023; 5. "High" Released: 20 October 2023; 6. "Summer Days" Released: 19 January 2024

Under the Light is the fifth studio album by the Australian indie rock band San Cisco. It was released on 1 March 2024 through Island City Records.

== Reception ==
Jeff Jenkins from Stack Magazine said "This record is one big pop thrill from start to finish. You could call San Cisco's sound 'radio-licious' – pop radio should eat it up."

== Track listing ==
All tracks are written and produced by San Cisco and James Ireland, except for "Under the Light", co-written with Jay Watson, and "Summer Days", co-written with Nicholas Allbrook and solely produced by San Cisco.

Under the Light track listing
| No. | Title | Length |
|---|---|---|
| 1. | "Lost Without You" | 3:41 |
| 2. | "High" | 3:08 |
| 3. | "Under the Light" | 3:33 |
| 4. | "One Percent" | 3:36 |
| 5. | "Summer Days" (featuring Nicholas Allbrook) | 4:28 |
| 6. | "Honeycomb" | 2:43 |
| 7. | "Find Yourself Here Again" | 2:28 |
| 8. | "Horoscope" | 2:56 |
| 9. | "Family Trust" | 3:41 |
| 10. | "Consequence" | 3:57 |
| 11. | "Into My Heart" | 3:59 |
| Total length: | | 38:10 |

== Personnel ==
San Cisco

- Josh Biondillo – performance, production
- Jordi Davieson – performance, production
- Scarlett Stevens – performance, production

Additional musicians

- Jay Watson – acoustic guitar, bass, synthesizer (track 3)
- Nicholas Allbrook – vocals (track 5)
- Jesse Kotansky – strings (tracks 7, 9)

Technical

- James Ireland – production, engineering (all tracks); mixing (track 6)
- Mike Bozzi – mastering (tracks 1–6, 8–11)
- Guy Davie – mastering (track 6)
- Neal H. Pogue – mixing (tracks 1–3, 8)
- Anthony Dolhai – mixing (tracks 4, 5, 7, 9–11)
- Jesse Kotansky – string engineering (tracks 7, 9)
- Matty Harris – additional mixing (track 9), additional mix engineering (5)
- Joshua Biondillo – additional engineering
- Jay Watson – additional engineering (tracks 5, 11)

Visuals

- Jeffrey Annert – design, layout, typeface
- Olivia enior – photography

== Charts ==
Chart performance for Under the Light
| Chart (2024) | Peak position |
|---|---|
| Australian Albums (ARIA) | 47 |
