= 2013 ARIA Music Awards =

Annual Australian music awards

- Date: 1 December 2013
- Venue: Star Event Centre, Sydney, New South Wales

Highlights
- Most wins: Flume (4)
- Most nominations: Flume (8)
- Website: ariaawards.com.au

Television/radio coverage
- Network: Nine Network

The 27th Annual Australian Recording Industry Association Music Awards (generally known as ARIA Music Awards or simply the ARIAs) were a series of award ceremonies which included the 2013 ARIA Artisan Awards, ARIA Hall of Fame Awards, ARIA Fine Arts Awards and ARIA Awards. The last ceremony, the ARIA Awards, occurred on 1 December at the Star Event Centre, and was telecast on Nine Network's channel Go! at 7:30pm.

The final nominees for ARIA Award categories were announced on 14 October as well as nominees and winners for Fine Arts Awards and Artisan Awards. Public votes were used for the categories, "Song of the Year", "Best Australian Live Act", "Best International Artist" and "Best Video".

At the 1 December ceremony, ARIA inducted Air Supply into their Hall of Fame, and created a new award category, ARIA Industry Icon, which was awarded to promoter and record label owner, Michael Gudinski.

== Performers ==
The following artists performed at the ARIA Music Awards.

- Flume
- Tame Impala
- Birds of Tokyo
- Vance Joy
- Bliss n Eso
- Jessica Mauboy
- Samantha Jade
- Sheppard
- The Potbelleez
- Stafford Brothers
- Alison Wonderland
- Alicia Keys
- Lorde

== ARIA Hall of Fame Inductee ==
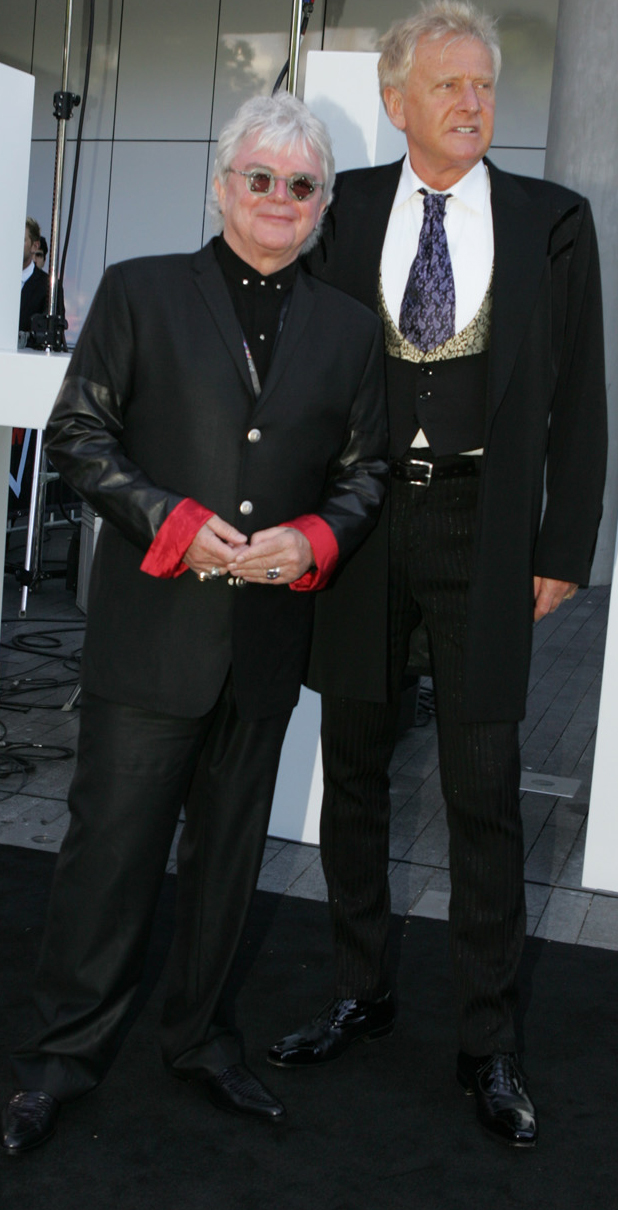
Air Supply members Russell Hitchcock (at left) and Graham Russell

- Air Supply – Upon the announcement of the group's induction into ARIA Hall of Fame, Russell Hitchcock, one of the two founders with Graham Russell, declared "[i]t is a great honour for us, and it was something that was totally unexpected". The pair were due to return to Australia for the ceremony and "have fun with everybody and we want to say thank you to all who participated in our ARIA Hall of Fame induction".

== Nominees and winners ==
=== ARIA Awards ===
Winners are listed first and highlighted in boldface; other final nominees are listed alphabetically by artists' first name.

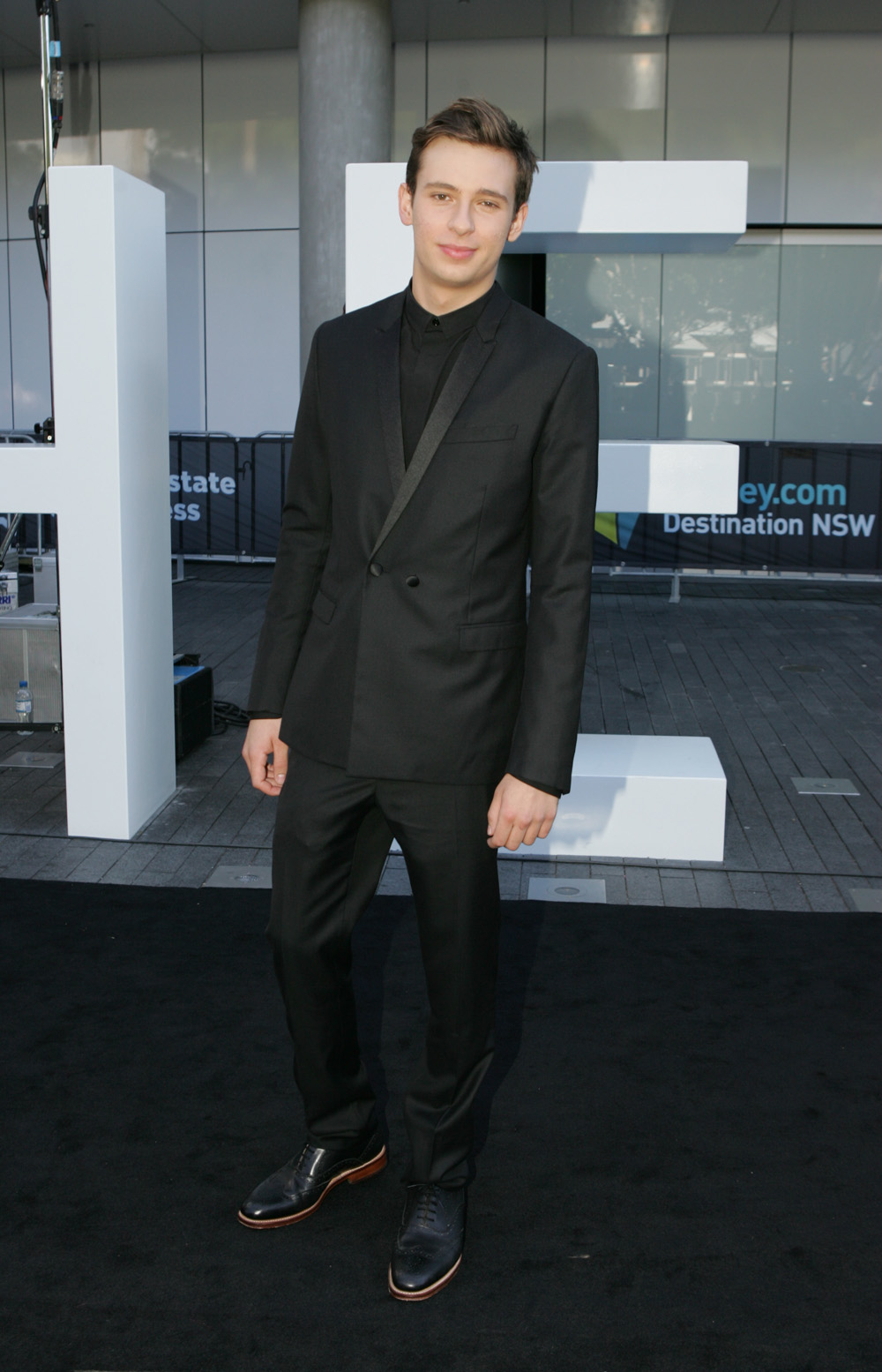
Flume (a.k.a. Harley Streten) won four awards from eight nominations.

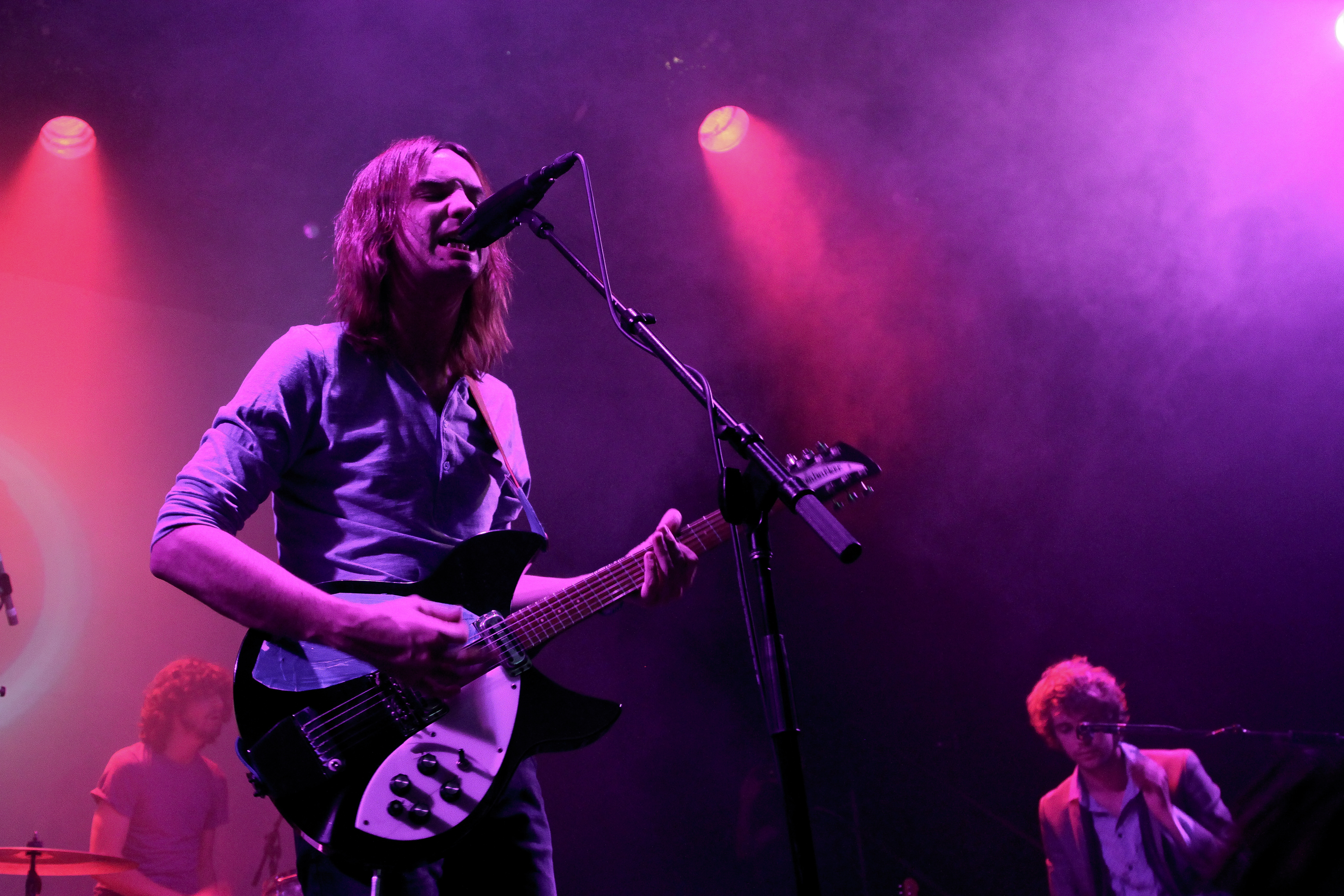
Tame Impala were nominated for seven awards and won three. Photo taken in 2012.

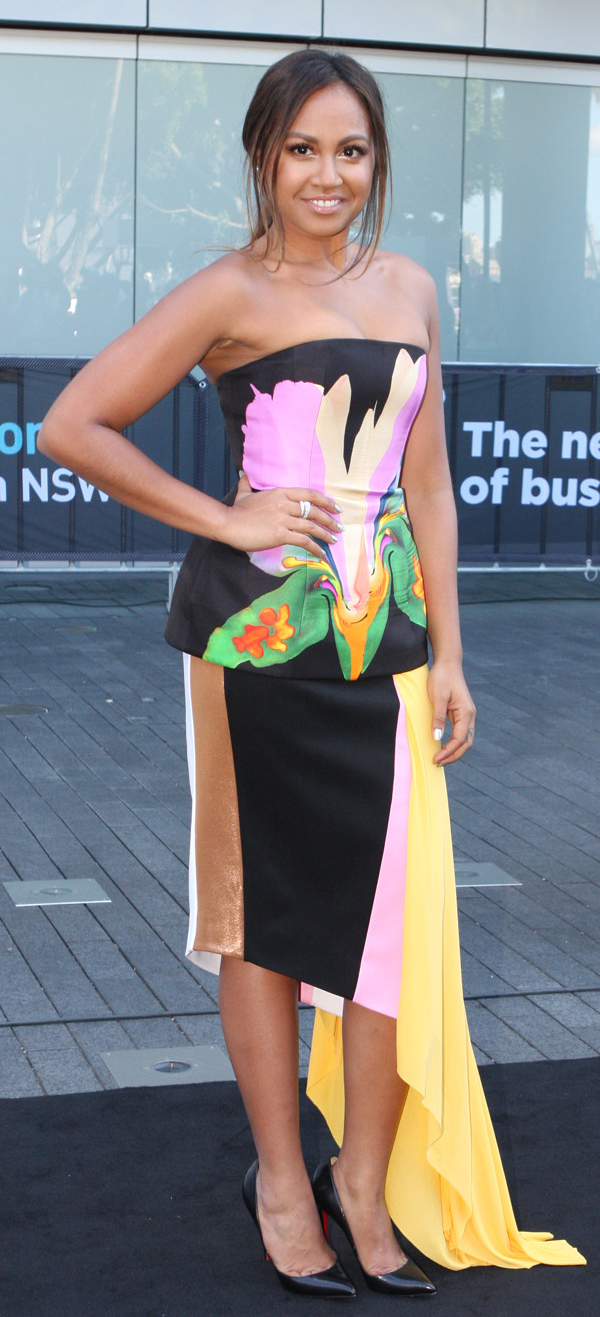
Jessica Mauboy won Best Female Artist.

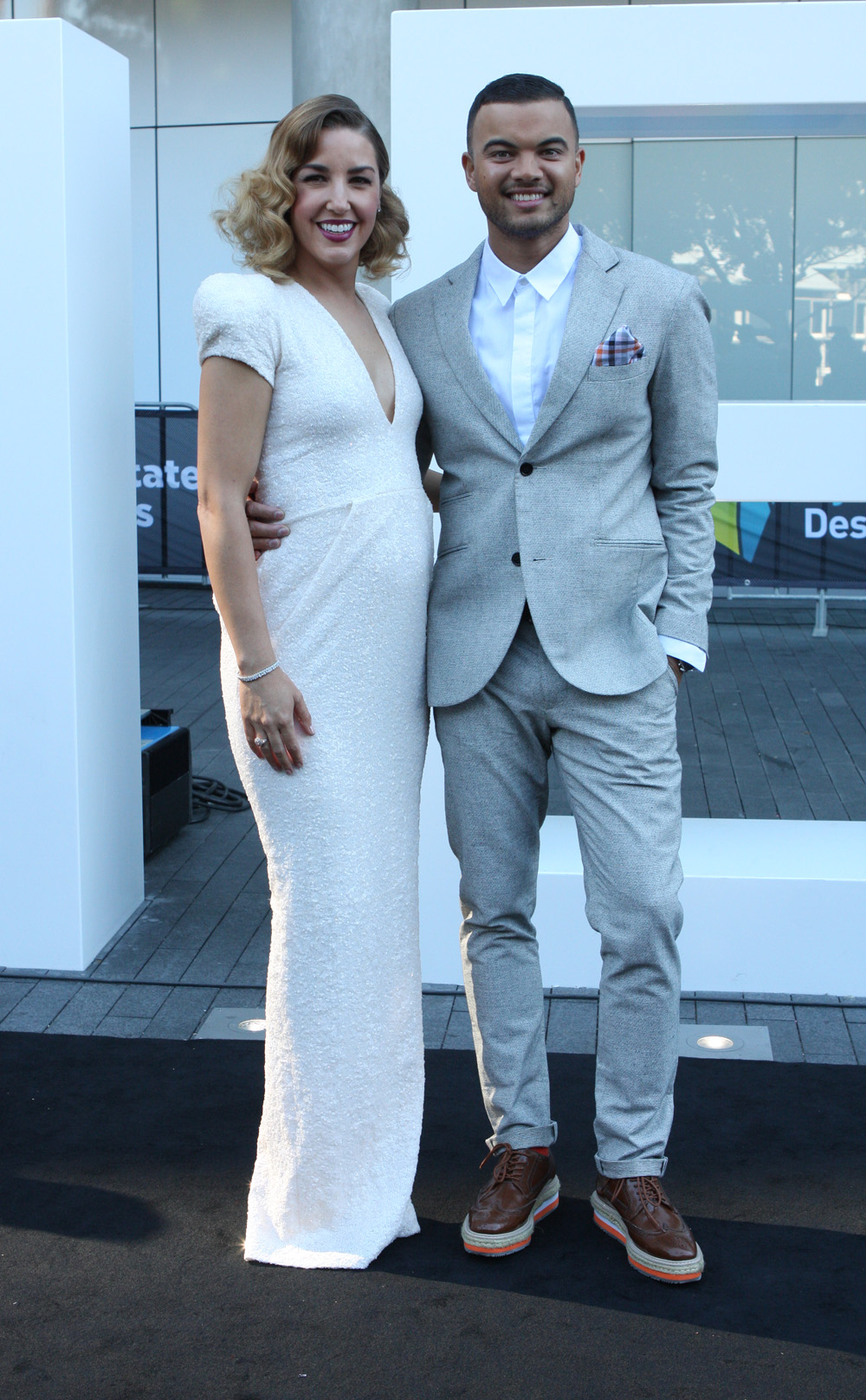
Jules Sebastian and Guy Sebastian (at right). Guy won Best Pop Release and Best Australian Live Act.

Album of the Year	Best Group
**Tame Impala – Lonerism**; Birds of Tokyo – March Fires; Flume – Flume; Guy Sebastian – Armageddon; Nick Cave and the Bad Seeds – Push the Sky Away	**Tame Impala – Lonerism**; Birds of Tokyo – March Fires; Boy & Bear – Harlequin Dream; Empire of the Sun – Ice on the Dune; Nick Cave and the Bad Seeds – Push the Sky Away
Best Male Artist	Best Female Artist
**Flume – Flume**; Guy Sebastian – Armageddon; Keith Urban – "Little Bit of Everything"; Matt Corby – "Resolution"; Paul Kelly – Spring and Fall	**Jessica Mauboy – "To the End of the Earth"**; Abbe May – Kiss My Apocalypse; Emma Louise – vs Head vs Heart; Missy Higgins – "Set Me on Fire"; Sarah Blasko – I Awake
Breakthrough Artist – Release	Best Independent Release
**Flume – Flume**; Big Scary – Not Art; RÜFÜS – Atlas; The Rubens – The Rubens; Vance Joy – God Loves You When You're Dancing	**Nick Cave and the Bad Seeds – Push the Sky Away**; Big Scary – Not Art; San Cisco – San Cisco; Sheppard – "Let Me Down Easy"; The Drones – I See Seaweed
Best Adult Contemporary Album	Best Blues & Roots Album
**Nick Cave and the Bad Seeds – Push the Sky Away**; Bob Evans – Familiar Stranger; Clare Bowditch – The Winter I Chose Happiness; Josh Pyke – The Beginning and the End of Everything; Sarah Blasko – I Awake	**Russell Morris – Sharkmouth**; Archie Roach – Into the Bloodstream; Mama Kin – The Magician's Daughter; Melbourne Ska Orchestra – Melbourne Ska Orchestra; The Cat Empire – Steal the Light
Best Hard Rock/Heavy Metal Album	Best Rock Album
**Karnivool – Asymmetry**; Airbourne – Black Dog Barking; Northlane – Singularity; The Amity Affliction – Chasing Ghosts; Thy Art Is Murder – Hate	**Tame Impala – Lonerism**; Birds of Tokyo – March Fires; Boy & Bear – Harlequin Dream; The Drones – I See Seaweed; The Rubens – The Rubens
Best Urban Album	Best Country Album
**Illy – Bring It Back**; Bliss n Eso – Circus in the Sky; Horrorshow – King Amongst Many; Seth Sentry – This Was Tomorrow; Urthboy – Smokey's Haunt	**Kasey Chambers and Shane Nicholson – Wreck & Ruin**; Jasmine Rae – If I Want To; Lee Kernaghan – Beautiful Noise; Sara Storer – Lovegrass; Troy Cassar-Daley and Adam Harvey – The Great Country Songbook
Best Children's Album	Best Comedy Release
**Justine Clarke – A Little Day Out with Justine Clarke**; Giggle and Hoot – Claw Tapping Tunes; Jay Laga'aia – Ten in the Bed; Sam Moran – Play Along with Sam; The Wiggles – Taking Off	**Tom & Alex – The Bits We're Least Ashamed of**; Colin Buchanan – The TGIF Songs of Colin Buchanan; Housos – Live; Sammy J and Randy – Bin Night; Pauly Fenech – Pauly's Shorts
Best Pop Release	Best Dance Release
**Guy Sebastian – Armageddon**; Empire of the Sun – Ice on the Dune; San Cisco – San Cisco; The Preatures – "Is This How You Feel?"; Vance Joy – God Loves You When You're Dancing	**Flume – Flume**; Jagwar Ma – Howlin'; The Potbelleez – "Saved in a Bottle"; The Presets – Pacifica; RÜFÜS – Atlas
Song of the Year (Note: Public voted category.)	Best Video
**Matt Corby – "Resolution"**; Birds of Tokyo – "Lanterns"; Bombs Away (featuring The Twins) – "Party Bass"; Flume – "Holdin On"; Guy Sebastian – "Get Along"; Justice Crew – "Best Night"; Samantha Jade – "What You've Done to Me"; Stafford Brothers (featuring Lil Wayne & Christina Milian) – "Hello"; Timomatic – "Parachute"; Vance Joy – "Riptide"	**Samantha Jade – "Firestarter" – Christopher Frey**; Birds of Tokyo – "Lanterns" – Josh Logue; Flight Facilities (featuring Christine Hoberg) – "Clair De Lune" – Dave Ma; Flume – "Holdin On" – Joe Nappa; Justice Crew – "Best Night" – Marc Furmie; Matt Corby – "Resolution" – Bryce Jepson; Nick Cave and the Bad Seeds – "Jubilee Street" – John Hillcoat; San Cisco – "Fred Astaire" – Andrew Nowrojee; Timomatic – "Parachute" – Marc Furmie & Elisa Mercurio; Vance Joy – "Riptide" – Dimitri Basil
Best Australian Live Act	Best International Artist
**Guy Sebastian**; Birds of Tokyo; Flume; Karnivool; Keith Urban; Matt Corby; Nick Cave & the Bad Seeds; Paul Kelly and Neil Finn; Tame Impala; The Drones	**One Direction**; Birdy; Bruno Mars; Ed Sheeran; Macklemore & Ryan Lewis; Michael Bublé; Mumford & Sons; Of Monsters and Men; P!nk; Taylor Swift

=== Fine Arts Awards ===
Winners are listed first and highlighted in boldface. (Note: The winners of the Fine Arts Awards were announced on 14 October 2013.)

Best Classical Album
- **Sally Whitwell** – **All Imperfect Things: Solo Piano Music of Michael Nyman**
  - Amy Dickson, Melbourne Symphony Orchestra – Catch Me If You Can
  - David Hansen – Rivals: Arias for Farinelli & Co.
  - Jane Sheldon – North + South
  - Melbourne Symphony Orchestra, Nigel Westlake – Missa Solis: Requiem for Eli
Best Jazz Album
- **The Idea of North** – **Smile**
  - Andrea Keller – Family Portraits
  - Jonathan Zwartz – The Remembering & Forgetting of the Air
  - Renée Geyer – Swing
  - Tommy Emmanuel and Martin Taylor – The Colonel & the Governor
Best Original Soundtrack/Cast/Show Album
- **Paul Kelly, James Ledger, Genevieve Lacey & ANAM Musicians** – **Conversations with Ghosts**
  - David Bridie – Satellite Boy
  - Nick Cave and Warren Ellis – Lawless
  - Tina Arena – Symphony of Life
  - Various Artists – triple j's One Night Stand
Best World Music Album
- **Joseph Tawadros** – **Chameleons of the White Shadow**
  - Airileke – Weapon of Choice
  - Rasa Duende – Improvisations
  - Shellie Morris & The Borroloola Songwomen – Together We Are Strong – Ngambala Wigi Li – Wun the Song Peoples Sessions
  - Various – Mélodie Française

=== Artisan Awards ===
Winners are listed first and highlighted in boldface. (Note: The winners of the Artisan Awards were announced on 14 October 2013.)

Best Cover Art
- **Aaron Hayward and David Homer (Debaser)** – **Empire of the Sun** – **Ice on the Dune**
  - Glen Hannah – Kasey Chambers and Shane Nicholson – Wreck & Ruin
  - Graeme Base – The Cat Empire – Steal the Light
  - Justin Maller – Bliss n Eso – Circus in the Sky
  - Kevin Parker & Leif Podhajsky – Tame Impala – Lonerism
Engineer of the Year
- **Virginia Read** – **Sally Whitwell** – **All Imperfect Things**
  - Dann Hume – Alpine – Seeing Red
  - Kevin Parker – Tame Impala – Lonerism
  - Nicky Bomba, Robin Mai – Melbourne Ska Orchestra – Melbourne Ska Orchestra
  - Peter Mayes – Empire of the Sun – Ice on the Dune
Producer of the Year
- **Harley Streten** – **Flume** – **Flume**
  - Kevin Parker – Tame Impala – Lonerism
  - Luke Steele, Nick Littlemore, Peter Mayes and Jonathan Sloan – Empire of the Sun – Ice on the Dune
  - Virginia Read – Sally Whitwell – All Imperfect Things
  - Wayne Connolly and Boy and Bear – Boy and Bear – Harlequin Dream

== See also ==
- Music of Australia
