= Fred Astaire (song) =

Single by San Cisco

from the album San Cisco
- Released: 25 January 2013
- Studio: Sing Sing Studios
- Length: 2:56
- Label: San Cisco Music
- Songwriters: Jordi Davieson * Josh Biondillo * Scarlett Stevens * Nick Gardner
- Producer: Steven Schram

San Cisco singles chronology
"Beach" (2012)	"Fred Astaire" (2013)	"Get Lucky" (2013)

Music video
- "Fred Astaire" on YouTube

"Fred Astaire" is a song recorded by Australian indie pop band San Cisco, from the band's debut self-titled studio album. Originally released as a CD-R promotional single in November 2012, "Fred Astaire" was released as the album's second Australian single (third overall) in January 2013. The song debuted and peaked at number 89 in Australia in February 2013.

The song polled at number 48 in the Triple J Hottest 100, 2012.

The song was released in North America in May 2013.

At the ARIA Music Awards of 2013, the Andrew Nowrojee directed video was nominated for Best Video.

== Reception ==
Jason Grishkoff from Indie Shuffle said the song a "thoroughly fun indie pop single." Daniel Martin from NME called the song "Super-sickly indie pop".

== Track listings ==
Digital single

1. "Fred Astaire" - 2:56

7" single

1. "Fred Astaire"
2. "John's Song"

== Charts ==
Chart (2013)	Peak position
Australia (ARIA)	89
United Kingdom physical sales(OCC)	90
