= The Fergusons =

Background information
- Origin: Perth, Western Australia, Australia
- Genres: Alternative rock
- Years active: 1999 - 2005
- Labels: Independent; Dew Process
- Members: Al Nistelberger; Grant Joyce; Wayne Beadon; Matt Wheeler; Mike Bruce

The Fergusons were a five-piece alternative rock band from Perth, Western Australia, formed in late 1999/early 2000 with members Al Nistelberger (vocals, guitar), Mike Bruce (vocals, guitar), Wayne Beadon (guitar), Grant Joyce (bass), and Matt Wheeler (drums). The band gained momentum after their debut gig in March 2000 and went on to release their first EP, "Hurting the Washing Machine," in June 2001, which received local chart success and airplay on Triple J. Notable achievements include winning WAMI awards, signing a deal with Australian independent record label Dew Process in 2003. Despite lineup changes, successful performances, and recording efforts for a debut album, financial constraints led to the severance of ties with Universal Records in 2004. The band officially disbanded in 2005 after playing a farewell gig. Post-split, members pursued other projects, with Nistelberger, Joyce, and Beadon forming the Bipolar Bears. A brief reunion for an acoustic performance occurred in 2007. The Fergusons' debut album, however, remained incomplete.

== History ==
The Fergusons formed around late 1999/early 2000, comprising Al Nistelberger (vocals, guitar), Mike Bruce (vocals, guitar), Wayne Beadon (guitar), Grant Joyce (bass) and Matt Wheeler (drums). Beadon and Joyce met when forming the band Hornbaker and Nistelberger and Bruce met forming Tarmac. Both bands met on the Perth music scene both being booking for a number of gigs.

The band's first gig was at the Grosvenor Hotel as part of the '20 Minutes of Fame' band competition in March 2000. As a result of their performance, the band scored their first 'real' gig - supporting Turnstyle, Red Jezebel, Cartman and Fourth Floor Collapse at the Grosvenor Hotel's 113th Birthday celebrations in May 2000.

In June 2001 the Fergusons released their debut EP, Hurting the Washing Machine. The EP topped the local charts and received airplay on community radio nationwide. The song "Waste of Time" was added to moderate rotation on Triple J. The band were interviewed by Richard Kingsmill on the Oz Music Show, and they later recorded a four track live set for the program.

The band were winners in the category of 'Best Emerging Act' for Western Australia at the Australian Live Music Awards.

In September 2001 the Fergusons won three WAMI awards, including most popular CD launch. The band then headed back to the studio, recording their second EP, Never Too Young To Hitchhike which was released in May 2002. The song "Everything's Gone Bad' received very heavy rotation on Triple J, and went on reach No. 88 on Triple J's Hottest 100. The band's live following in Perth continued to expand, culminating in a performance at the ABC Studios in Perth for Triple J's Live at the Wireless in September 2002.

Following The Fergusons performance at Perth's Rock-It Festival in October 2002, they headed to the East Coast for the first time, playing a couple of shows with UK band Seafood. Their live shows impressed representatives of the label Dew Process eventually resulting in the band signing a deal with Dew Process, and the label re-releasing Never Too Young To Hitchhike in digipack format in early 2003.

In February 2003 the band played at the Perth Big Day Out, touring the eastern states again in April, with You Am I and Palladium. Whilst in Melbourne they recorded the "Sinner is Red" single and was produced by Melbourne based Lindsay Gravina (Magic Dirt, Eskimo Joe, Jebediah, The Living End, Jet), Spiderbait). "Sinner Is Red" was released on 14 July, as the first single from The Fergusons' forthcoming album.

With major supports, such as The Breeders, J Mascis, The Salteens, and The Violent Femmes, high rotation on national and local radio stations across the country, several WAMI Awards and a live performance at Splendour in the Grass in 2003, the band had come a long way from their Perth garage.

At the end of 2003 Mike Bruce decided to leave the band and played his last show with the Fergusons at Curtin University in February 2004. The band continued as a four-piece, and in March and April the Fergusons toured with the Hoodoo Gurus on the Western Australian leg of their national tour.

Jonathan Burnside (Eskimo Joe, The Sleepy Jackson) was recruited as producer for the Fergusons' debut album, and he came to Perth in July 2004 to do a week of pre-production on the album. Along the way he added horns, strings and other instrumentation which saw the album's budget skyrocket. Universal Records refused to fund the album, meaning Dew Process were unable to continue recordings. In September 2004 the band and the label severed ties. In November 2004 Matt Wheeler decided to move to Melbourne, resulting in the remaining members of the band decided to call it a day.

The Fergusons played a farewell gig early in 2005 to a packed Amplifier Bar, with support from a host of Western Australia's favourite indie bands. Though their debut album was in the pipeline for a couple of years, the long-player was never completed.

Since the band's split, Nistelberger, Joyce and Beadon have been working on a new project, the Bipolar Bears, which also features Little Birdy drummer Matt Chequer.

In 2007 three of the band members, Nistelberger, Joyce and Beadon re-formed for a one-off acoustic performance in Fremantle, Western Australia where they were joined on stage by members of Little Birdy, Eskimo Joe and The Avenues.

== Band members ==
- Al Nistelberger - guitar, vocals
- Grant Joyce - bass, vocals
- Wayne Beadon - guitar, vocals
- Matt Wheeler - drums, vocals
- Mike Bruce - guitar, vocals

== Discography ==
=== Extended plays ===
Title	Details
Hurting the Washing Machine	Released: June 2001; Label: Independent (MWA057); Format: CD, digital download
Never Too Young To Hitchhike	Released: May 2002; Label: Independent; Format: CD, digital download
Sinner is Red	Released: 2003; Label: Dew Process (DEW905072); Format: CD, digital download

== Awards and nominations ==
=== West Australian Music Industry Awards ===
The Western Australian Music Industry Awards (commonly known as WAMis) are annual awards presented to the local contemporary music industry, put on by the Western Australian Music Industry Association Inc (WAM). The Fergusons won six awards.

Year	Nominee / work	Award	Result (wins only)
2001	The Fergusons	Most Promising New Local Original Band	Won
2001	The Fergusons	Most Popular Original Indie Act	Won
2001	Hurting the Washing Machine	Most Popular Local Original CD Launch	Won
2002	The Fergusons	Most Popular Local Original Pop Act	Won
2002	The Fergusons	Most Popular Original Indie Act	Won
2003	The Fergusons	Most Popular Original Indie Act	Won
