= The Flairz =

Australian garage rock band

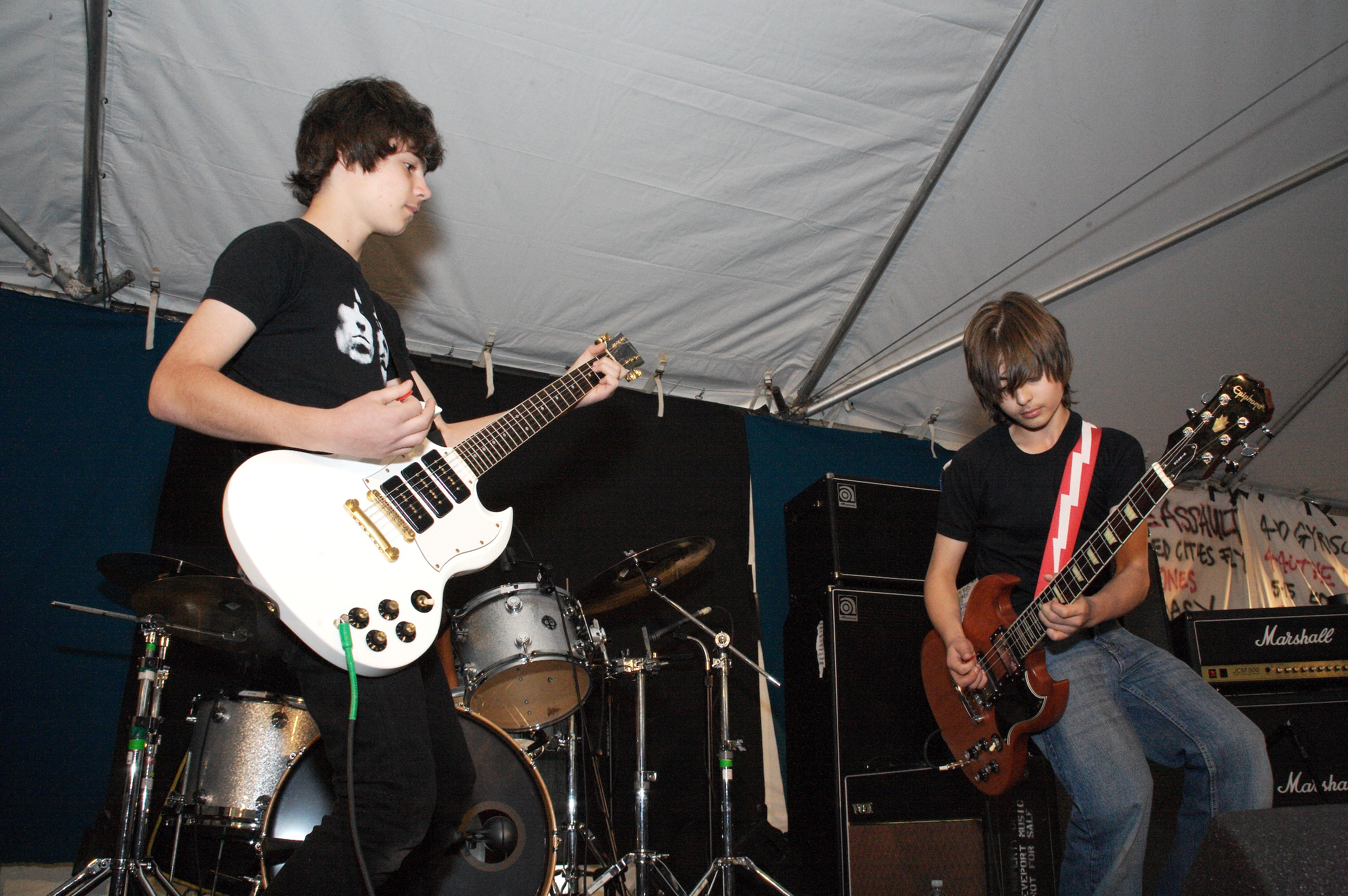
- L to R: John and Dion Mariani; SXSW, Austin, March 2006

Background information
- Origin: Fremantle, Western Australia, Australia
- Genre: Garage rock
- Years active: 2003–2009
- Label: Lefroy/MGM
- Past members: Dion Mariani; John Mariani; Scarlett Stevens; Georgia Wilkinson Derums
- Website: myspace.com/theflairz/

The Flairz were an Australian garage rock band from Perth. They were formed as a trio in late 2003 by pre-teens, Dion Mariani on guitar, bass guitar and vocals, his cousin, John Mariani on guitar, bass guitar and vocals, and Scarlett Stevens on drums and vocals. Late in 2006 Georgia Wilkinson-Derums joined on bass guitar. The group issued a studio album, Black Fox (July 2008), and two extended plays, Rock and Roll Ain't Evil (November 2004) and Bullseye (February 2007). The group disbanded in November 2009 with Stevens forming an indie pop band, San Cisco.

== History ==
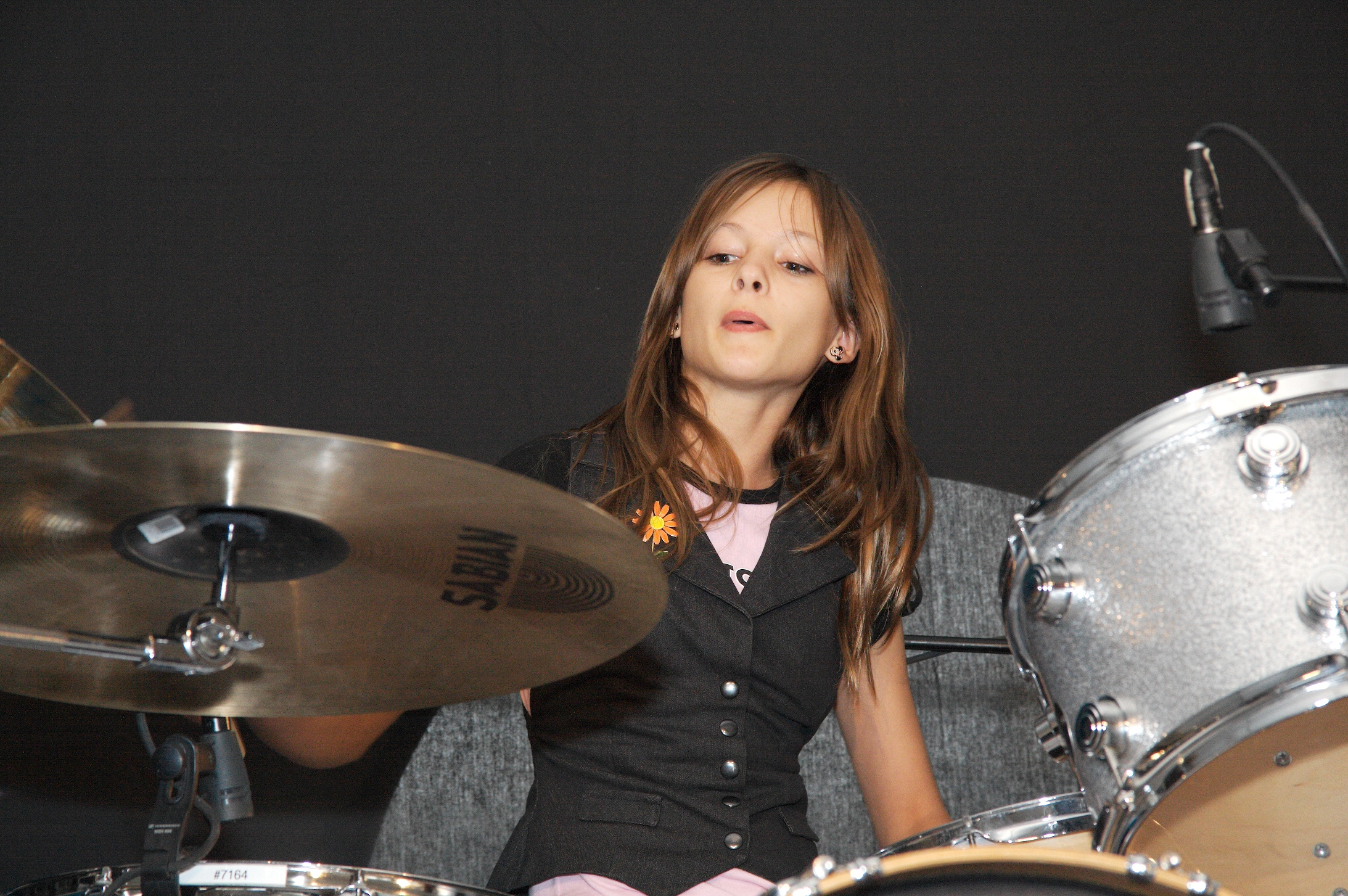
Scarlett Stevens on drums, SXSW, Austin, March 2006

Flairz were formed as a garage rock trio in 2003 in Perth by Dion Mariani on guitar and vocals, his cousin, John Mariani on guitar and vocals, and Scarlett Stevens on drums and vocals. John's father is Dom Mariani, the Stems, the Someloves). Dion's father is Laurie Mariani (Dom's brother), a stage lighting engineer. Stevens is the daughter of Phil Stevens, co-founder of Jarrah Records, manager of John Butler Trio and of the Waifs, he is a former live music venue owner. The three children had been introduced to each other by their parents.

The Flairz played their first show in December 2003, Dion recalled, "We played at the Arts Centre. We supported Little Birdy. And it was lots of fun... It was like we made real music like a real band." The cousins were ten-years-olds and Stevens had just turned eleven. In April 2004 they appeared on George Negus Tonight with Brendan Hutchens declaring, "[they] have been playing together for 5 months now and are causing quite a stir not just because they sound so good but because their average age is 10.5." They won the Primary Category in September 2004 at the West Australian Music Industry Awards for their track, "Sidewalk Surfer".

Their first extended play, Rock and Roll Ain't Evil, was released on 15 November 2004 via Lefroy Records and MGM Distribution. It was produced by Dom Mariani, where Dion and John alternated on bass guitar on two tracks each of its four tracks. Jeff Jenkins at HowlSpace felt, "the sound would make any Stems fan smile. Big, groovy and likeable." They received airplay on commercial and community radio across Australia, including national station, Triple J.

The title track was declared, "coolest song in the world this week", by Steven Van Zandt (a.k.a. Little Steven) in September of that year on an episode of his syndicated rock show, Little Steven's Underground Garage. It received regular airplay on the Sirius Satellite Radio channel of the same name. However, Liz Giuffre of Oz Music Project opined, "With a premise that's a little too simplistic... I knew it wasn't evil. Evil stuff tends not to be so bland." The EP includes "Sidewalk Surfer", which Giuffre felt, "[is] a colour-by-numbers type of surf pop but at least a bit more convincing."

In 2005 the band played at the St Kilda Festival, the Come Together Music Festival, the Big Day Out and Rock-It. They received positive press coverage in the United States in March 2006 when they played the South by Southwest (SXSW) music conference in Austin, Texas. Phil Stevens later remembered how, "Word spread quickly and the various showcases got bigger and bigger each day. It was very exciting and an amazing experience for the band. We had many record label lunches and formed friendships with [Van Zandt] and featured on his garage rock show." Late in 2006 Georgia Wilkinson-Derums joined on bass guitar.

Bullseye is the second four-track EP by the Flairz; it appeared on 3 February 2007. It had Dean Oliver on bass guitar. The West Australian's writer described how the cousins, "wrote the riffs for the rockin' 'Bullseye' but were stuck for lyrics, so they opened a dictionary at a random page and, well, bullseye. The lads wrote the other standout track, 'How I Live', about themselves." Airplay of tracks from the EP was reasonably high and related music videos were used on Rage, Video Hits, Channel [V]. They performed at the Bon Scott Celebration Concert to raise money for a statue of the AC/DC singer. Also in 2007 they provided a cover version of "Shipping Steel", which featured Dave Larkin (of Dallas Crane), for the Cold Chisel tribute album, Standing on the Outside.

In July 2008 the Flairz released its first full-length studio album, Black Fox, which was produced by Dom Mariani. It had been recorded over the previous two years with Shaun O’Callaghan at Studio Couch and John Villani at Northbridge Studios. A limited-edition version included a bonus six-track disc, The Early Years 2003-2006. MediaSearch's Carmine Pascuzzi observed, "[its] a spirited album featuring ten songs full of style, bravado and rock, the power of the package is undeniable! 'Mr.Richards' is the lead single, a powerful tribute to the legendary Keith Richards."

== Break-up, Reunion and After ==
In November 2009, after six years, the Flairz broke up as the members embarked on individual pursuits. Stevens formed an indie pop band, San Cisco, with high school students, Josh Biondillo, Jordi Davieson and Nick Garner. Dion Mariani formed rock group, Custom Royal. In 2018 joined local Perth Garage-Rock outfit, Ray Finkle and as of October 2019 began a new project under the moniker, Vancool.

In 2016 the Flairz reunited; Joseph Wilson of theMusic.com.au caught their gig at the Navy Club and declared, "[the cousins] gave it their all, each sharing the role of vocals throughout the songs. Propped up by the artisanal drums from [Stevens] and playful bass by [Derums], their set felt like a much-missed relic of the past." In the interim, Wilkinson-Derums has worked as an actress and graduated from National Institute of Dramatic Art (NIDA) in 2014. She is a member of all female rock band, Body Type.

== Members ==
- Dion Mariani – guitar, vocals, bass guitar
- John Mariani – guitar, vocals, bass guitar
- Scarlett Stevens – drums, vocals
- Georgia Wilkinson Derums – bass guitar, vocals

== Discography ==
=== Studio albums ===
Title	Album details
Black Fox	Released: 15 July 2008; Label: Lefroy Records/MGM (FLZ003); Formats: CD, digital download

=== Extended plays ===
Title	EP details
Rock And Roll Ain't Evil	Released: 15 November 2004; Label: Lefroy Records/MGM (FLZ001); Formats: CD, digital download
Bullseye	Released: 3 February 2007; Label: Lefroy Records/MGM (FLZ002); Formats: CD, digital download
The Early Years 2003-2006	Released: 15 July 2008 (bonus CD released with Black Fox); Label: Lefroy Records/MGM; Formats: CD, digital download

== Awards ==
=== WAM Song of the Year ===
The WAM Song of the Year was formed by the Western Australian Rock Music Industry Association Inc. (WARMIA) in 1985, with its main aim to develop and run annual awards recognising achievements within the music industry in Western Australia.

Year	Nominee / work	Award	Result (wins only)
2004	"Sidewalk Surfer"	ASME Primary Category	Won
