= The Bits We're Least Ashamed of =

Compilation album by Tom and Alex
- Released: April 2013
- Recorded: 2010–2013
- Genre: Comedy
- Label: ABC, UMA

The Bits We're Least Ashamed of is the debut album of material by Australian comedians, Tom and Alex. The album is a compilation from their Triple J breakfast show, released in April 2013.

At the ARIA Music Awards of 2013 the album won the ARIA Award for Best Comedy Release.

== Reception ==
Jan Wisniewski from The Music said "Tom Ballard and Alex Dyson have been hosting the triple j Breakfast Show since 2010 and have now compiled a selection of their favourite moments. The longtime friends from Warrnambool share an easy rapport... [and] despite their comradery, the best spots are saved for callers, who, with some minor prompting from the hosts, are sources of hilarity." Wisniewski concluded saying, "There is no doubt there are some funny moments on this album but the short length of the tracks and hearing many of the jokes out of context makes The Bits We're Least Ashamed of no more satisfactory an experience than listening to a regular triple j Breakfast broadcast. But for those who are great fans of Ballard and Dyson, the chance to relive these moments is merit enough for this release."

== Track listing ==
1. "Welcome"
2. "2 Phones, 1 Call"
3. "Dylan, The Only Male Stripper in Launceston"
4. "The Tom Ballard News Heaslines"
5. "Alex's Time Trial"
6. "Kingsmill Italiano (Part 1)"
7. "Tabouli No Good for Me"
8. "Circumcised?"
9. "Lewl McKirdy Teaches Alex How to Drive"
10. "Jake the Disagreeable Listener"
11. "Flight Fiasco"
12. "Kingsmill Italiano (Part 2, The Remixes)"
13. "Ollie Wards Done a Parody Song"
14. "Gwen, Kanye West's Seamstress"
15. "A Tale from a Theatre"
16. "Annette Done Accent"
17. "Kingsmill Italiano (Part 3, The Delivery)"
18. "Brain Sponge"
19. "Aga Baga Laga Baga"
20. "Kingsmill Italiano (Part 4, Kebabs)"
