= Gracetown (album) =

Studio album by San Cisco
- Released: 6 March 2015
- Genre: Indie rock, indie pop
- Length: 37:11
- Label: Island City Records
- Producer: Josh Biondillo, Jordi Davieson, Steven Schram

San Cisco chronology
San Cisco (2012)	Gracetown (2015)	The Water (2017)

Singles from Gracetown
- 1. "Run" Released: 24 October 2014; 2. "Too Much Time Together" Released: February 2015; 3. "Magic" Released: May 2015; 4. "About You (Acoustic)" Released: 3 May 2019

Professional ratings
Review scores
Source	Rating
AllMusic	3.5/5 stars

Gracetown is the second studio album by the Australian indie rock band San Cisco. The album is titled after a small town in Western Australia. It was released on 6 March 2015. The album peaked at number 2 on the ARIA Chart.

The band toured through Australia and internationally in 2015 to promote the release of the album.

== Track listing ==
Standard edition
No.	Title	Writer(s)	Length
1.	"Run"	Jordi Davieson, Josh Biondillo, Matthew Giovannangelo, Scarlett Stevens, Steven Schram	3:14
2.	"Too Much Time Together"	Davieson, Biondillo, Stevens, Schram	2:49
3.	"Magic"	Davieson, Biondillo, Stevens, Schram	3:38
4.	"Snow"	Davieson, Biondillo, Giovannangelo, Stevens, Schram	3:34
5.	"Wash It All Away"	Davieson, Biondillo, Schram	3:38
6.	"Bitter Winter"	Davieson, Biondillo, Stevens, Schram	2:18
7.	"Jealousy" (featuring Isabella Manfredi)	Jonny Lattimer, Davieson, Biondillo, Stevens, Schram	2:24
8.	"Super Slow"	Davieson, Biondillo, Stevens, Schram	2:42
9.	"Mistakes"	Davieson, Biondillo, Stevens	2:27
10.	"About You"	Davieson, Biondillo, Stevens	3:27
11.	"Skool"	Davieson, Biondillo, Stevens	2:30
12.	"Just For a Minute"	Davieson, Biondillo, Stevens	4:22
Total length:			37:03

Digital bonus track
No.	Title	Writer(s)	Length
13.	"Flashbang" (iTunes bonus track)	Davieson, Biondillo, Stevens, Schram	1:50

== Charts ==
Chart (2015)	Peak position
Australian Albums (ARIA)	2

== Release history ==
Region	Date	Format	Label	Catalogue
Australia	6 March 2015	CD; LP; digital download	Island Records	SAN04
Internationally	6 March 2015	CD; LP; digital download; cassette	Embassy of Music	5054196561321
