= Flaws (EP) =

EP by San Cisco
- Released: 27 March 2020
- Labels: San Cisco, Island City Records

San Cisco chronology
| The Water (2017) | Flaws (2020) | Between You and Me (2020) |

Singles from Flaws
- 1. "Skin" Released: 23 October 2019; 2. "Reason" Released: 13 February 2020; 3. "Flaws" Released: 27 March 2020

Flaws is an extended play (EP) by Australian indie rock band San Cisco, released on 27 March 2020.

In March 2020, San Cisco frontman Jordi Davieson said of the EP "It's not totally separate to the album, it's more just a taste of what's going to be on the album." Mid-2020 tour dates promoting Flaws were cancelled and postponed due to the Corona virus outbreak.

== Critical reception ==
Georgia Kearins from The Creative Issues called the EP "A perfect formula of melancholy and euphoria".

== Track listing ==
| No. | Title | Length |
|---|---|---|
| 1. | "Flaws" | 3:42 |
| 2. | "Reasons" | 3:12 |
| 3. | "Skin" | 4:27 |
| 4. | "Gone" | 3:05 |
