= Alex Dyson =

Australian radio presenter (born 1988)

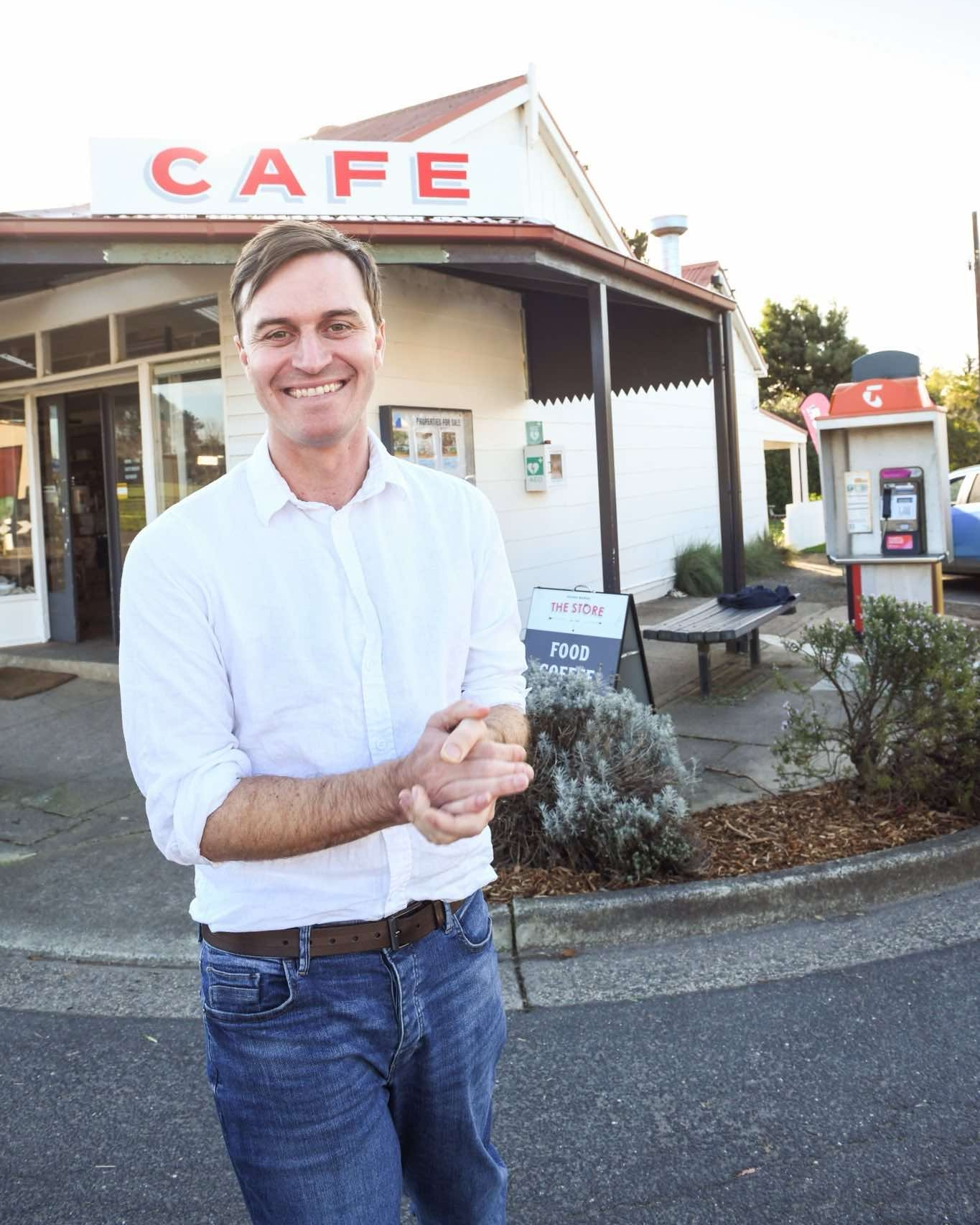
- Dyson pictured outside The Store in Deans Marsh in 2024
- Born: Alexander Edward Dyson; 22 June 1988 (age 38); Warrnambool, Victoria, Australia
- Education: University of Melbourne
- Political party: Independent
- Presenting career
- Station: Triple J
- Country: Australia

Alexander Edward Dyson (born 22 June 1988) is an Australian radio presenter who presented the breakfast show on Australian youth radio station Triple J from 2010 to 2016, alongside Tom Ballard and then with Matt Okine. He is also a small business owner and published author. He contested the seat of Wannon at the 2019, 2022 and 2025 federal elections.

== Personal life ==
Dyson was born to parents Ian and Helen Jean Dyson and grew up in Warrnambool, Victoria. Dyson's mother died when he was four years old. He graduated from the University of Melbourne with a Bachelor of Creative Arts.

== Career ==
Dyson began his radio career on Warrnambool community station 3WAY FM with Tom Ballard. Dyson and Ballard began presenting mid-dawn shifts for Australian youth radio station, Triple J in 2007 after program director, Chris Scaddan, saw Ballard perform stand-up comedy at Raw Comedy. They made their transition to weekend radio in late 2008, taking over from Sam Simmons.

On 23 November 2009, Triple J announced that Ballard and Dyson would take over as hosts of the breakfast show in 2010, replacing Robbie Buck, Marieke Hardy and Lindsay McDougall. Matt Okine joined Dyson as co-host in January 2014 when Ballard left Triple J. During this period his audience of up to one million people heard Dyson interview a wide range of people including many up-and-coming Australian musicians, politicians such as Prime Minister Julia Gillard, and worldwide celebrities including Arnold Schwarzenegger. In 2013 Dyson and Ballard won the Aria award for Best Comedy Release with an album of extracts from their radio show called The Bits we’re least ashamed of.

On 21 November 2016, Triple J announced that Okine and Dyson would be leaving Triple J at the end of 2016. Dyson returned to Triple J as a temporary Lunch (Weekdays 12 - 3pm) host in 2018, while regular host Gen Fricker filled in for Veronica Milsom on Drive.

In 2019, Dyson announced he was running in the seat of Wannon for the 2019 Australian federal election. His campaign was brief but featured an unusual video where he presented his key policies via interpretive dance. The video received extensive media coverage both within Australia and internationally. Despite the limited campaign, Dyson secured 10.3% of the vote, despite the seat being classified as a safe Coalition seat since the 1970s.

In 2020, just at the beginning of the global COVID pandemic, Dyson opened a live comedy venue Comedy Republic.

Dyson is the author of two books, a young adult fiction novel When it Drops, released in 2020, and a children’s book Eric the Awkward Orc, released in 2022. When it Drops was awarded on the 2021 “Notable” list by the Children’s Book Council of Australia.

Dyson announced his candidacy for Wannon at the 2022 federal election on 7 January 2022, running on a platform of action on climate change, integrity and respect in Parliament, and investing in the regional economy. His candidacy was supported by Voices of Wannon, one of a substantial number of grassroots community groups supporting independent candidates across Australia at the 2022 election. Dyson ended up narrowly losing to Dan Tehan, securing 19.29% of the votes in the first preference count, and 46.08% of the votes in the two candidate preferred count.

In August 2024 Dyson announced his intention to contest the seat of Wannon as an independent at the 2025 Australian federal election. He secured 31.38% of the first preference vote, mostly at the expense of Labor and the Greens, though fell short by 3.27% once preferences were distributed.

== Discography ==
=== Albums ===
List of albums
Title	Album details
The Bits We're Least Ashamed of (with Tom Ballard)	Released: April 2013; Label: ABC, UMA (3713506); Formats: CD, download
Play It Out (with Matt Okine)	Released: 2016; Label: ABC; Formats: CD, download

== Awards and nominations ==
=== ARIA Music Awards ===
The ARIA Music Awards are a set of annual ceremonies presented by Australian Recording Industry Association (ARIA), which recognise excellence, innovation, and achievement across all genres of the music of Australia. They commenced in 1987.

Year	Nominee / work	Award	Result	Ref.
2013	The Bits We're Least Ashamed of (with Tom Ballard)	Best Comedy Release	Won	
2016	Play It Out (with Matt Okine)	Best Comedy Release	Nominated	

== See also ==
- List of grassroots political engagement groups in Australia
