= Beach (song) =

Single by San Cisco

from the album San Cisco
- Released: 10 December 2012
- Length: 3:41
- Label: San Cisco Music
- Songwriters: Jordi Davieson, Josh Biondillo, Nick Gardner, Scarlett Stevens
- Producer: Steven Schram

San Cisco singles chronology
"Wild Things" (2012)	"Beach" (2012)	"Fred Astaire" (2013)

Music video
- "Beach" on YouTube

"Beach" is a song written and recorded by Australian indie pop band San Cisco, listed from the band's debut self-titled studio album. The song was released in the United Kingdom, as the band's debut single on 10 December 2012 where the song was released as a 2x7" single.

== Reception ==
Professional ratings
Review scores
Source	Rating
NME	3.5/5 stars

Alice Juster from MusicFeeds said the song "is romantically haunting, featuring vocals from both Jordi Davieson and Scarlett Stevens, who launches into a bright and dreamy chorus."

Dan Stubbs from NME called the song "blissful and filmic, with [a] throbbing emoti-bass and spooky-kid vocals in the chorus."

Rebecca Clough from The Digital Fix called it "the catchiest chorus you'll have heard for a while".

Paul Lester from The Guardian said, "'[Beach]' opens with a keyboard chord that is pure 'Africa' by Toto, suggestive of chill-wave opulence, but when the song gets going it becomes an indie singalong, albeit one with a kick."

== Music video ==
The music video premiered on 31 October 2012. It was filmed on Brighton Beach and was directed by Ruskin Kyle.

== Track listings ==
UK 2x 7" single

1. "Beach"
2. "Golden Revolver"
3. "Reckless"
4. "Lover"

Digital single

1. "Beach" - 3:40

== Release history ==
Region	Date	Format	Edition(s)	Label	Catalogue
Australia	31 October 2012	Video	Video		
United Kingdom	10 December 2012	2x 7" LP	Limited edition	Columbia, Sony Music	88765428667
Australia	29 March 2013	digital download	Standard	San Cisco Music	
