= San Cisco =

Australian indie pop band

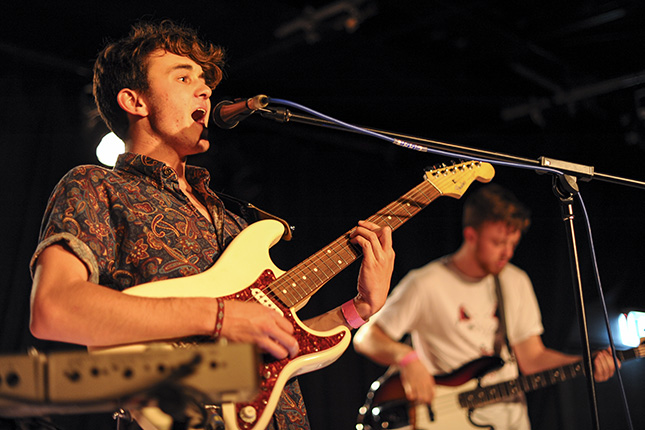
- San Cisco live at the Bakery, 2012

Background information
- Origin: Fremantle, Australia
- Genres: Indie pop, indie rock, indie folk, psychedelic rock, psychedelic pop, jangle pop
- Years active: 2009–present
- Labels: Island City Records, Nettwerk, RCA, Fat Possum
- Members: Jordi Davieson; Josh Biondillo; Scarlett Stevens
- Past members: Nick Gardner; Jennifer Aslett
- Website: sancisco.com

San Cisco are an Australian indie pop band that formed in 2009 in Fremantle, Western Australia. The band are a three-piece, and currently consist of Jordi Davieson (guitar, lead vocals), Josh Biondillo (guitar, vocals) and Scarlett Stevens (drums, vocals). Davieson and Biondillo share duties on keyboards. In November 2011, the band was signed by Albert Productions, but moved to Island Records for the release of its debut album. In October 2012, the band described its 'vibe' as "squelchy, crispy, streamlined, hairy, indie". At the ARIA Music Awards of 2013 the group were nominated for Best Independent Release and Best Dance Release for the album; and Best Video for "Fred Astaire", which was directed by Andrew Nowrojee.

== History ==
=== Formation ===
The three male members of San Cisco attended the same high school, Christian Brothers College in Fremantle, whilst Stevens attended nearby Iona Presentation College. Singer/guitarist Davieson and drummer Stevens have known each other since early childhood. At only thirteen Davieson's first band was The Real Life Animators. The band formed in early December 2005, with Albert Loss on lead guitar and vocals, Davieson on rhythm guitar and vocals, Bill Lawrie on drums, and Theo Campbell on bass guitar. The band played around Fremantle, supporting other bands such as the Watts and the Flairz. Stevens' first performances were in December 2003, at age eleven, as the drummer for the rock trio, the Flairz, together with Dion Mariani and John Mariani. Meanwhile, Biondillo and Davieson also bonded over a shared interest in skateboarding, the water, and music. Stevens is the daughter of Phil Stevens, who co-founded Jarrah Records with both the John Butler Trio and The Waifs, two bands that he also manages. Biondillo has explained, "I started playing guitar when I was in high school, about year 8 or 9, but it was mostly just playing music in my bedroom. So I did that until I met Jordi and then we started jamming together."

In late 2009, Davieson, Stevens, and Biondillo started playing music together and were later joined by bass guitarist Gardner. Initially called King George, the band changed its name to San Cisco after surveying friends and fans. According to the band, "there is no link between the city San Francisco and our name San Cisco. .... The reason we went with San Cisco was because it is nothing; like a blank canvas which we were able to sculpt into whatever we wanted".

=== 2010–2011: Golden Revolver ===
In 2010, San Cisco recorded their debut EP Golden Revolver at Blackbird Studios, in Perth, Western Australia. The EP's five songs were co-produced by Little Birdy drummer Matt Chequer and veteran engineer/producer Steven Schram (Little Birdy, The Waifs, Cat Empire, Little Red). "Golden Revolver", the EP's critically acclaimed lead single, received heavy airplay on national Australian radio station Triple J. XFM London DJ Mike Walsh said of "Golden Revolver"; "If this song was brought to me as the next Vampire Weekend single, I would not be disappointed".

The music video for "Golden Revolver" shows the band sailing along Western Australia's Margaret River on a makeshift boat. The group's second single "Girls Do Cry" and a cover of Perth band Tame Impala's 2010 single "Solitude is Bliss" are also featured on the EP. Prior to the release of Golden Revolver, San Cisco was profiled in a December episode of Triple J Unearthed.

San Cisco performed at numerous festivals throughout 2011, such as Adelaide's Fuse Festival, BIGSOUND in Brisbane, the Melbourne, Victoria leg of the St Jerome's Laneway Festival, the Pyramid Rock Festival on Victoria's Phillip Island, Peats Ridge Festival in New South Wales' Glenworth Valley, and the Western Australian stops of the Big Day Out and the Groovin' the Moo festivals. The band has also supported established Australian acts, such as The Grates, Jebediah and Architecture in Helsinki, and made appearances on the Australian version of BalconyTV (filmed in Brisbane, Queensland) and 3 News.

In late 2011, the band was signed by Albert Productions, the home of major Australian acts such as AC/DC and Megan Washington—the label described San Cisco's sound as "rough, low-fi garage pop" mixed with "bright catchy hooks". In September 2011, the band released "Awkward" and became the band's first charting single. In an interview, Davieson said to song is "...a bit of a weird story about a stalker, involving me and Scarlett. It's completely made up". The song was voted number 7 in the Triple J Hottest 100, 2011.

=== 2012–2013: Awkward and San Cisco ===
In February 2012, the band's released their second EP, Awkward.

In September 2012, the band left Albert Productions to join the roster of United States (US) label, Fat Possum Records—a deal that was made in partnership with RCA Records—for the release of its debut album San Cisco in all territories, except for Australia, on 23 November 2012. Singles "Wild Things" and "Fred Astaire" were released from the album and featured in the Triple J Hottest 100, 2012. In December 2012, Triple J announced that the station's listeners had voted San Cisco into the No. 10 position in the "Listeners Top 10 Albums Poll".

In March 2013, San Cisco appeared at the CMJ Festival in New York City. Writing for the Bullett website, Luke O'Neil presented the band's CMJ showcase in a positive light saying "Better off not planning to do anything and hope you accidentally stumble across something you didn't know you wanted to see and avoid disappointment. That's what happened last night ... I found an Australian band called San Cisco playing, and against all odds, their breezy indie charms—something of a cross between Vampire Weekend and Arctic Monkeys, put the first smile on my face of the night."

In May 2013, San Cisco recorded a cover version of the Daft Punk's "Get Lucky" and N*E*R*D's "Hypnotize U" for Triple J's Like a Version segment.

At the ARIA Music Awards of 2013 the group were nominated for Best Independent Release and Best Pop Release for their debut album; and Best Video for "Fred Astaire", which was directed by Andrew Nowrojee.

=== 2014–2016: Gracetown ===
In October 2014, San Cisco released "Run", the lead single from their second studio album Gracetown, which was released on 6 March 2015. The title of which was inspired by Gracetown a small coastal town in Western Australia. In early March immediately prior to the release of the album, bass player, Nick Gardner accidentally shot himself in the foot when rabbit shooting at a friend's farm near Collie. As a result, he missed the band's tour of the United States and Mexico, promoting the new album.

=== 2017–2019: The Water ===
San Cisco released their third studio album The Water on 5 May 2017. The album was preceded with the singles "Slo-Mo" and "Hey, Did I Do You Wrong?".

To promote the album, the band commenced one of their biggest Australian tours on 18 May 2017. Visiting 21 shows in 46 days, guitarist Josh Biondillo said ahead of the tour: "Yeah it's definitely a big one. I think it will be a good reintroduction to the fans and the crowd. The whole thing, I think, for me, is a lot more mature. Even though we're still doing the silly stuff that we've always done, but hopefully in the tour [you'll see our] maturity as songwriters and performers." They played at the 2017 Splendour in the Grass festival.

=== 2020–present: Flaws, Between You and Me and Under the Light ===
In March 2020, the band released the EP, Flaws. In July 2020, the band announced the release of Between You and Me, released on 4 September 2020.

On 24 February 2023, the band released "Lost Without You", the first single from their fifth studio album Under the Light. In October 2023, the band released "High", their fifth single of the year, and announced the album's title as well as its release date of 1 March 2024.

== Influences ==
The band has identified MGMT, The Flaming Lips and Vampire Weekend as influences on its songwriting and, as of January 2011, Stevens worked in a record store, a connection that the band members have explained "creates new influences and ideas, which we can apply to our own music."

== Other projects ==
Stevens is responsible for the backing vocals on the Bob Evans (Kevin Mitchell, of Jebediah fame) song "Go", from his fourth album Familiar Stranger. She performed vocals on the single version of Australian rapper Illy's song Tightrope.

== Band members ==
=== Current members ===
- Jordi Davieson – lead vocals, guitar (2009–present), keyboards (2018–present), occasional bass (2019–present)
- Josh Biondillo – guitar, backing vocals, keyboards, synthesizers (2009–present)
- Scarlett Stevens – drums, backing and lead vocals (2009–present)

=== Current touring musicians ===
- Mitchell J Benson – bass, backing vocals, occasional drums (2019–present)
- James Ireland – keyboards (2020–present)

=== Former members ===
- Nick Gardner – bass guitar, keyboards (2009–2018)
- Jennifer Aslett – bass, backing vocals (2018–2019)

== Discography ==
=== Studio albums ===
List of studio albums, with release date, label, and selected chart positions shown
Title	Album details	Peak chart positions	
Title	Album details	AUS	US Heat
San Cisco	Released: 23 November 2012; Label: Island City (SAN03); Formats: CD, LP, digital download	17	16
Gracetown	Released: 6 March 2015; Label: Island City (SAN04); Formats: CD, LP, digital download	2	—
The Water	Released: 5 May 2017; Label: Island City (SAN05); Formats: CD, LP, digital download, streaming	17	—
Between You and Me	Released: 4 September 2020; Label: Island City (SAN06); Formats: CD, LP, digital download, streaming	3	—
Under the Light	Released: 1 March 2024; Label: Island City (SAN07); Formats: CD, LP, digital download, streaming	47	—

=== EPs ===
List of EPs released, with release date and label shown
Title	EP details
Golden Revolver	Released: 4 February 2011; Label: Island City Records (SAN01); Formats: Digital download, CD, streaming
Awkward	Released: 3 February 2012; Label: Island City Records (SAN02); Formats: Digital download, CD, streaming
Flaws	Released: 27 March 2020; Label: San Cisco, Island City Records; Formats: Digital download, streaming

=== Singles ===
List of singles as lead artist, with year released, selected chart positions and certifications, and album name shown
Title	Year	Peak chart positions				Certifications	Album
Title	Year	AUS	BEL (FL)	NLD	UK Sales	Certifications	Album
"Golden Revolver"	2010	—	—	—	—		Golden Revolver EP
"Girls Do Cry"	2010	—	—	—	—		Golden Revolver EP
"Awkward"	2011	32	124	74	—	ARIA: 2× Platinum	Awkward EP
"Rocket Ship"	2011	—	—	—	—		Awkward EP
"Wild Things"	2012	57	—	—	—		San Cisco
"Beach"	2012	—	—	—	—		San Cisco
"Fred Astaire"	2013	89	—	—	90		San Cisco
"Get Lucky" (Triple J Like a Version)	2013	—	—	—	—		Like a Version: Volume Nine
"Run"	2014	67	—	—	—		Gracetown
"Too Much Time Together"	2015	98	—	—	—	ARIA: Platinum	Gracetown
"Magic"	2015	—	—	—	—		Gracetown
"B Side"	2016	—	—	—	—		Non-album single
"SloMo"	2016	—	—	—	—		The Water
"Hey, Did I Do You Wrong?"	2017	—	—	—	—		The Water
"The Distance"	2017	—	—	—	—		The Water
"4Ever" (Triple J Like a Version)	2018	—	—	—	—		Like a Version: Volume Fifteen
"When I Dream"	2018	—	—	—	—		Non-album single (Note: "When I Dream" was originally released as a non-album single, but is included on Between You and Me.)
"About You" (acoustic release)	2019	—	—	—	—	ARIA: Gold	Gracetown
"Skin"	2019	—	—	—	—	ARIA: Gold	Flaws (Note: "Skin", "Reasons", and "Flaws" are all also included on Between You and Me.)
"Reasons"	2020	—	—	—	—	ARIA: Gold	Flaws
"Flaws"	2020	—	—	—	—		Flaws
"On the Line"	2020	—	—	—	—		Between You and Me
"Messages"	2020	—	—	—	—		Between You and Me
"Alone"	2020	—	—	—	—		Between You and Me
"H.O.L.I.D.A.Y."	2022	—	—	—	—		ReWiggled
"Lost Without You"	2023	—	—	—	—		Under the light
"Horoscope"	2023	—	—	—	—		Under the light
"Honeycomb"	2023	—	—	—	—		Under the light
"Under the Light"	2023	—	—	—	—		Under the light
"High"	2023	—	—	—	—		Under the light
"Summer Days" (featuring Nicholas Allbrook)	2024	—	—	—	—		Under the light
"Miles Away"	2026	—	—	—	—		
"—" denotes single that did not chart or was not released.

== Awards ==
=== AIR Awards ===
The Australian Independent Record Awards (commonly known informally as AIR Awards) is an annual awards night to recognise, promote and celebrate the success of Australia's Independent Music sector.

Year	Nominee / work	Award	Result
2012	"Awkward"	Best Independent Single/EP	Nominated
2012	themselves	Breakthrough Independent Artist	Nominated

=== APRA Awards ===
The APRA Awards are presented annually from 1982 by the Australasian Performing Right Association (APRA), "honouring composers and songwriters". They commenced in 1982.

Year	Nominee / work	Award	Result	Ref.
2012	"Awkward" (Jordi Davieson / Joshua Biondillo / Nick Gardner / Scarlett Stevens / Steven Schram)	Song of the Year	Shortlisted	

=== ARIA Music Awards ===
The ARIA Music Awards is an annual awards ceremony that recognises excellence, innovation, and achievement across all genres of Australian music. San Cisco has been nominated for six nominations.

Year	Nominee / work	Award	Result
2012	Awkward	Best Independent Release	Nominated
2012	Awkward	Best Pop Release	Nominated
2012	Awkward	Breakthrough Artist - Release	Nominated
2013	San Cisco	Best Independent Release	Nominated
2013	San Cisco	Best Pop Release	Nominated
2013	"Fred Astaire" (directed by Andrew Nowrojee)	Best Video	Nominated

=== J Award ===
The J Awards are an annual series of Australian music awards that were established by the Australian Broadcasting Corporation's youth-focused radio station Triple J. They commenced in 2005.

Year	Nominee / work	Award	Result
2011	themselves	Unearthed Artist of the Year	Nominated

=== National Live Music Awards ===
The National Live Music Awards (NLMAs) are a broad recognition of Australia's diverse live industry, celebrating the success of the Australian live scene. The awards commenced in 2016.

Year	Nominee / work	Award	Result
2017	Scarlett Stevens (San Cisco)	Live Drummer of the Year	Nominated
2019	Jennifer Aslett (San Cisco)	Live Bassist of the Year	Nominated

=== West Australian Music Industry Awards ===
The West Australian Music Industry Awards are annual awards celebrating achievements for Western Australian music. They commenced in 1985. San Cisco won seven awards in 2012.

Year	Nominee / work	Award	Result (wins only)
2012	San Cisco	Most Popular Group	Won
2012	San Cisco	Breakthrough Act	Won
2012	San Cisco	Pop Act of the Year	Won
2012	Awkward	Most Popular EP / Album	Won
2012	"Awkward"	Most Popular Single	Won
2012	"Awkward"	Most Popular Music Video	Won
2012	Scarlett Stevens	Drummer/Percussionist of the Year	Won
