= 3WAY FM =

- Australia
- Broadcast area: Warrnambool, Victoria, Australia
- Frequency: 103.7 MHz FM

Programming
- Language: English
- Format: Community radio

History
- First air date: September 1990
- Call sign meaning: 3 – Victoria; Warrnambool And You

Links
- Website: 3wayfm.org.au

3WAY FM (ACMA callsign: 3WAY) is an Australian community radio station based in Warrnambool, Victoria. Established in 1990, it broadcasts on frequency 103.7 FM and is a member of the Community Broadcasting Association of Australia.

Dave Hughes, Tom Ballard, Alex Dyson and Clinton Lee are some of the notable on Air personalities who started on 3way FM. Other less notable DJs were Mark Sedgely and Dan McGivern. McGivern under the pseudonym Steely Dan presented an Australian music show from 2002 to 2009 on GSFM 90.1 in South Australia.
