= Awkward (song) =

Single by San Cisco

from the album Awkward
- Released: 20 September 2011
- Studio: Sound Park Studios
- Genre: Indie pop
- Length: 2:33
- Label: Island City Records
- Songwriter(s): Steven Schram; Jordi Davieson; Josh Biondillo; Scarlett Stevens; Nick Gardner
- Producer(s): Steven Schram

San Cisco singles chronology
"Girls Do Cry" (2010)	"Awkward" (2011)	"Rocket Ship" (2011)

Music video
- "Awkward" on YouTube

"Awkward" is a song recorded by Australian indie pop band San Cisco and released in September 2011 as the lead single from their second extended play of the same name (2012).

In January 2012, the song was voted number 7 in the Triple J Hottest 100, 2011, and following this result, debuted and peaked at number 32 on the ARIA Singles Chart in February 2012 and was certified platinum in Australia in 2013. The song was later also voted number 78 in the Triple J Hottest 100 of the 2010s.

The song is a story of a young man stalking his crush, with duelling vocals by Jordi Davieson and Scarlett Stevens.

At the 2012 West Australian Music Industry Awards, the song won Most Popular Music Video and Most Popular Single.

In 2020, the song was used as part of an advertising campaign by KFC Australia.

== Reception ==
Music Feeds called the song "an unmistakable pop gem" while Christiana Bartolini from Indie Shuffle described the song as "simple, upbeat and actually really cute".

== Charts ==
Chart (2012)	Peak position
Australia (ARIA)	32
Netherlands (Single Top 100)	74

== Certifications ==
Region	Certification	Certified units/sales
Australia (ARIA)	2× Platinum	140,000^{‡}
^{‡} Sales+streaming figures based on certification alone.
