= Scarlett Stevens =

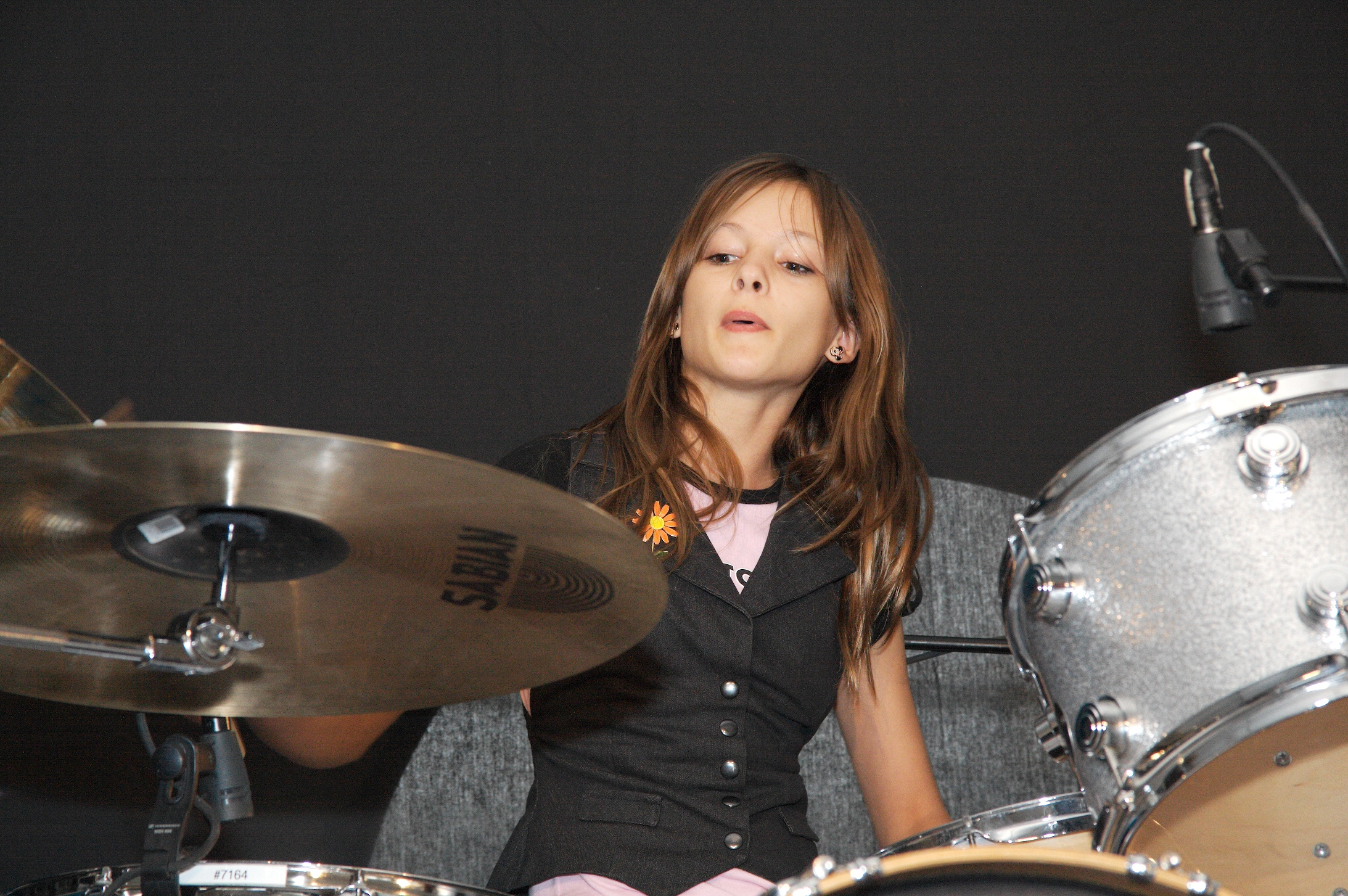
- Stevens performing with The Flairz in 2006

Background information
- Born: 12 November 1992 (age 33); Fremantle, Western Australia
- Genres: Indie pop, indie rock, indie folk
- Occupations: Drums, percussion, vocals
- Years active: 2003–present
- Labels: Albert Productions, Fat Possum Records

Scarlett Stevens is an Australian drummer and singer from the indie band San Cisco, The Flairz and grunge band Ghetto Crystals. She has performed on recordings by Bob Evans and Illy. She is the daughter of Phil Stevens, co-founder of Jarrah Records and manager of John Butler Trio and The Waifs.

== Music career ==
Stevens has been playing drums since she was ten years old, she started a garage rock band, the Flairz, at age eleven with a two friends, John and Dion Mariani (the son and nephew of Dom Mariani), both of whom played guitar, vocals and bass guitar. They played their first live show in December 2003, performing around Western Australia, in between school commitments. The band recorded and released two EPs and an album and performed at SXSW. In November 2009, at the end of high school, the Flairz disbanded and Stevens started jamming with other musicians around the same age. She was asked to play on a friend's recording, which led to the formation of King George, which later became San Cisco.

In a 2013 interview with Modern Drummer magazine Stevens recalls that her initial introduction to the drums happened when she met Jack Johnson's drummer, Adam Topol, who showed her how to play a basic rock beat. Following which he invited her to perform onstage for one song at the Forum Theatre in Melbourne and then again at Bonnaroo Music Festival the following year.

In 2014 she established a side project, a two-piece electronic hip-hop group, Ghetto Crystals, with Doug May (the guitarist and brother of Abbe May).

In 2023, she served as the drummer for founding Pond member Jay Watson's first solo GUM tour in support of his sixth studio album, Saturnia, where she was joined by her longtime boyfriend James Ireland on synthesizers, who also serves as the drummer of Pond and has contributed production for San Cisco.

== Discography ==
=== Singles ===
==== Featured singles ====
| Year | Single | Peak chart positions | Album |
| Year | Single | AUS | Album |
|---|---|---|---|
| "Go" (Bob Evans featuring Scarlett Stevens) | 2013 | 41 | Familiar Stranger |
| "Tightrope" (Illy featuring Scarlett Stevens) | 2014 | 18 | Cinematic |
"—" denotes releases that did not chart or were not released.

== Awards and nominations ==
=== National Live Music Awards ===
The National Live Music Awards (NLMAs) commenced in 2016 to recognise contributions to the live music industry in Australia.

| Year | Nominee / work | Award | Result |
|---|---|---|---|
| National Live Music Awards of 2017 | Scarlett Stevens (San Cisco) | Live Drummer of the Year | Nominated |

=== West Australian Music Industry Awards ===
The West Australian Music Industry Awards are annual awards celebrating achievements for Western Australian music. They commenced in 1985. San Cisco won six awards in 2012.

| Year | Nominee / work | Award | Result (wins only) |
|---|---|---|---|
| 2012 | Scarlett Stevens | Drummer/Percussionist of the Year | Won |
