= Paging Mr. Strike =

Album by Machine Gun Fellatio

Studio album by Machine Gun Fellatio
- Released: 26 August 2002
- Recorded: May 2002 ("Dirty Fucking Whore" recorded 2001)
- Studio: Tiger Studios
- Genre: Alternative rock, electronica
- Length: 54:47
- Label: Sputnik Records (Mushroom Records)
- Producer: Ross Johnston, Glen Dormand, Matt Ford, Warrick Leggo

Machine Gun Fellatio chronology
For the Ladies (2002)	Paging Mr. Strike (2002)	On Ice (2004)

Singles from Paging Mr. Strike
- 1. "The Girl of My Dreams Is Giving Me Nightmares" Released: 2002; 2. "Rollercoaster" Released: 2003; 3. "Pussy Town" Released: 2003; 4. "Take It Slow" Released: 2003

Professional ratings
Review scores
Source	Rating
AllMusic	3.5/5 stars

2nd Page for Mr. Strike

Studio album by Machine Gun Fellatio
- Released: 7 March 2003
- Label: Festival Records

Machine Gun Fellatio chronology
For the Ladies (2002)	2nd Page for Mr. Strike (2003)	On Ice (2004)

Paging Mr. Strike is the second studio album by the Australian alternative rock band Machine Gun Fellatio. The album was released on 26 August 2002 on Festival Mushroom Records. The album debuted at No.6 on the Australian Album Chart in September 2002 and spent a total of 27 weeks in the top 50. The album was certified platinum.

It was re-issued on 7 March 2003 under the title 2nd Page for Mr. Strike, which included an extra disc with eight new tracks. It was also released in the UK in 2003 by Doublethink Recordings, with a new track order and several tracks replaced by ones from the band's debut album, Bring It On!, which was never released internationally.

== Track listing ==
Paging Mr. Strike track listing
No.	Title	Writer(s)	Length
1.	"All of Them Ladies"	Maree Bonner, Glenn Dormand, Matt Ford, Warrick Leggo	4:33
2.	"Pussy Town"	Ford, Leggo	2:59
3.	"Take It Slow"	Dormand, Ford	3:49
4.	"Rollercoaster"	Dormand, Ford, Leggo	3:33
5.	"Line of Silver"	Dormand, Ford	3:24
6.	"Wot U Got"	Ford, Leggo	2:29
7.	"Amorous"	Dormand, Ford, Leggo	3:44
8.	"My Ex-Girlfriend's Boyfriend"	Ford	3:02
9.	"Mouth"	Ford, Ross Johnston, Leggo	3:15
10.	"The Mirrorball's Starting to Rock MK II"	Chris Arkley-Smith, Dormand, Leggo	4:10
11.	"Full Moon"	Dormand, Ford, Johnston	3:53
12.	"The Girl of My Dreams Is Giving Me Nightmares"	Ford, Leggo	3:31
13.	"Chase the Dragon"	Hooper, Perkins, Salmon	4:07
14.	"(Let Me Be Your) Dirty Fucking Whore"	Christa Hughes	1:36
15.	"Just B'coz"	Glenn Abbott, Ford, Leggo	6:42
16.	"Bonus material"
Total length:			54:47

Bonus disc "2nd Page for Mr. Strike"
No.	Title	Length
1.	"Take It Slow" (Skidder mix)	5:10
2.	"Pussytown" (Puretone's Beaver Fever mix)	3:15
3.	"Sick with the Taste (Of Truckers Come)" (The Pink Blues mix)	7:00
4.	"I Kissed a Girl"	2:49
5.	"Gulf Kont"	3:07
6.	"Dirty Old Man, Part 2"	2:27
7.	"Big Ears"	3:57
8.	"Take It Slow" (7am Recovery mix)	8:38

Bonus CD-ROM (Track order may be incorrect)
No.	Title	Length
1.	"All by Myself"	3:39
2.	"Girl of My Dreams"	3:32
3.	"Muthafukka on a Motorcycle"	2:30
4.	"Not Afraid of Romance"	3:11
5.	"Rollercoaster"	3:37
6.	"Unsent Letter"	3:56

"Dirty Fucking Whore" was previously released on Christa Hughes' 2001 solo EP Carrot Day - the recording on Paging Mr. Strike is the same as the EP, however excess noise at the beginning and end of the song has been trimmed.

== Charts ==
=== Weekly charts ===
Weekly chart performance for Paging Mr. Strike
Chart (2002–2003)	Peak position
Australian Albums (ARIA)	6

=== Year end charts ===
Year-end chart performance for Paging Mr. Strike
Chart (2002)	Peak position
Australia (ARIA)	80
Chart (2003)	Peak position
Australia (ARIA)	93

== Certifications ==
Certifications for Paging Mr. Strike
Region	Certification	Certified units/sales
Australia (ARIA)	Platinum	70,000^{^}
^{^} Shipments figures based on certification alone.
