= You Only Live Twice - The Incredibly True Story of the Hughes Family =

2010 documentary film

- Directed by: Brendan Young
- Written by: Brendan Young
- Produced by: Ruth Cullen
- Edited by: Anna Craney; Gabriella Muir
- Release date: 2010
- Running time: 55 minutes
- Country: Australia
- Language: English

You Only Live Twice - The Incredibly True Story of the Hughes Family is a 2010 Australian documentary film, written and directed by Brendan Young, covering four generations of the Hughes family. It looks at Richard, a ventriloquist, his son Richard, a journalist and spy, Dick, a journalist and musician, and Christa Hughes, a performer. It screened on the ABC in February 2010.

== Reception ==
Graeme Blundell of The Australian gave it a positive review stating "There is something charmingly vaudeville in the presentation of these extraordinary lives, directed and written with nice style by Brendan Young."

== Awards ==
- 2010 Australian Film Institute Awards
  - Best Documentary Under One Hour - Ruth Cullen - won
