= Impossible Love =

Impossible Love may refer to:

- Impossible Love (film), a 1932 German drama directed by Erich Waschneck
- An Impossible Love, a 2018 French drama directed by Catherine Corsini
- Impossible Love EP, a 2000 EP by Machine Gun Fellatio
- "Impossible Love", a song by Daniel Johnston from Rejected Unknown
