= The Know (TV program) =

Australian talk show

- Starring: Yumi Stynes; Jimmy Barnes; Lisa Hensley; Chit Chat Von Loopin Stab

Production
- Running time: 30 minutes (including commercials)

Original release
- Network: Max (Foxtel)/(Austar)

Related
- The MAX Sessions

The Know was an Australian talk show on Max.

== Starring ==
The pop culture show featured Yumi Stynes, musician Jimmy Barnes and actress Lisa Hensley as the main show hosts along with former Machine Gun Fellatio keyboardist, Chit Chat Von Loopin Stab.

The show discussed and reviewed movies, music, television and the creative arts.

== Former panelists ==
- Peter Timbs
