= Impossible Love EP =

EP by Machine Gun Fellatio
- Released: 2000 (AUS); 9 September 2003 (UK)
- Genre: Alternative rock
- Label: Mushroom (AUS); Doublethink (UK)

Machine Gun Fellatio chronology
Love Comes to an End (1997)	Impossible Love EP (2000)	Bring It On! (2000)

Impossible Love EP is an EP by Australian alternative rock band Machine Gun Fellatio, released in 2000.

== Track listing ==
Impossible Love (2000 AUS release)
No.	Title	Writer(s)	Length
1.	"100 Fresh Disciples"	Matt Ford, Glenn Dormand, Ross Johnston, Warrick Leggo	3:04
2.	"Mutha Fukka on a Motorcycle"	Matt Ford, Glenn Dormand, Ross Johnston, Christa Hughes, Pea	2:21
3.	"Leopards"	Matt Ford, Glenn Dormand	2:51
4.	"All By Myself"	Matt Ford, Ross Johnston, Warrick Leggo	3:53
5.	"Snake Oil"	Ross Johnston, Guy Fleming	4:23

Impossible Love (2003 UK release)
No.	Title	Writer(s)	Length
1.	"Mutha Fukka on a Motorcycle"	Matt Ford, Glenn Dormand, Ross Johnston, Christa Hughes, PEA	2:21
2.	"100 Fresh Disciples"	Matt Ford, Glenn Dormand, Ross Johnston, Warrick Leggo	3:04
3.	"Not Afraid of Romance"	Matt Ford, Glenn Dormand, Ross Johnston	3:42
4.	"Take It Slow" (Skidder Mix)	Matt Ford, Glenn Dormand	5:09
5.	"Free and Easy"	Glenn Dormand, Warrick Leggo, Christa Hughes	2:23

== Charts ==
Chart (2000)	Peak position
Australia (ARIA)	78
