= The Port Jackson Jazz Band =

Australian Jazz Band

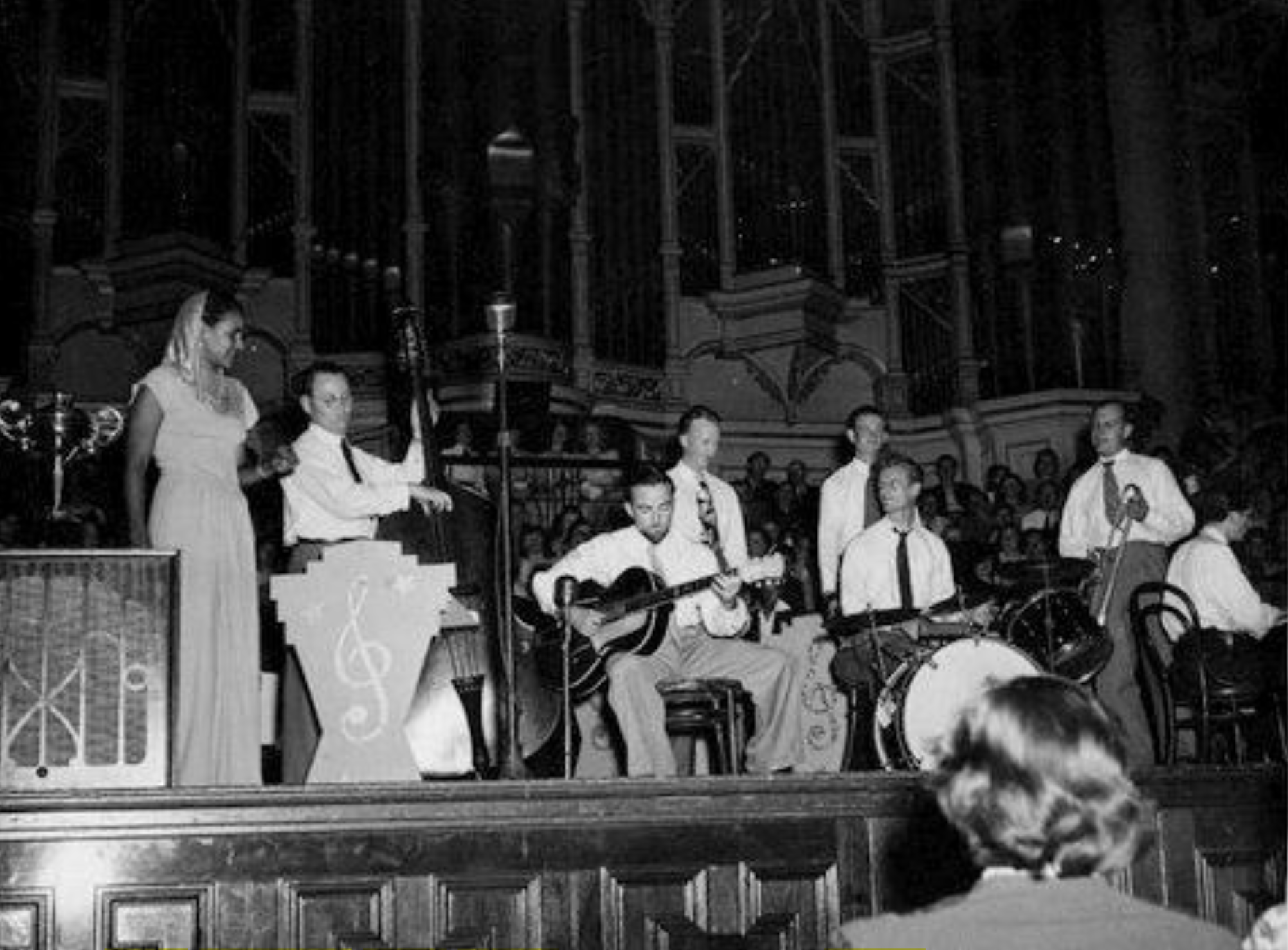
Port Jackson Jazz Band. Battle of the Bands, March 1948. Singer Georgia Lee, with Bruce Higginbotham, Ray Price, Bob Cruickshanks, Ken Flannery, Clive Whitcombe, Bob Rowan, Jimmy Somerville.

The Port Jackson Jazz Band were an Australian Dixieland jazz group formed in 1944 and based in Sydney. They were the longest running traditional jazz band in Australia and performed into the 1990s, though they had multiple breakups.

== History ==
Trombonist Jack Parkes formed the Port Jackson Jazz Band in 1944. Other original founding members included trumpeter Ken Flannery, but the roster evolved as military service and other commitments saw the band occasionally interrupted. They made their debut recording in 1945 which was unissued. It featured Parkes, Flannery, Alf Freeney (piano), John Sweeney (banjo), Duke Farrell (bass, vocals), and Mal Cooper (drums). Other recordings were made which were played by Sydney radio stations.

In 1947 Ray Price joined the then seven-piece band as their business manager / musical director, and played guitar and banjo in the rhythm section. That year the band made headlines when they refused to play at Sydney's Air Force House due to a "color ban" put in place by the venue management. The band members were all ex-servicemen and spoke out against racial prejudice and continued to play elsewhere. Their repertoire included tradition African-American music from the 1920s. In early 1948 the ensemble were the first artists to perform jazz at Sydney Conservatorium of Music. After an interstate tour where the band were accused of communist sympathies, the band broke up in 1948. Ken Flannery was the only remaining original founding member at this time, and he reformed the group the following year without Price.

In 1949 the band featured Ken Flannery (trumpet), Jim Somerville (piano), Bob Rowan (trombon), Ron Mannix (clarinet), Clive Whitecombe (drums), Doug Beck (guitar), and Bill Farmer (bass).

During the late 1940s, the band performed with singers Georgia Lee (singer) and Nellie Small in Sydney and Newcastle, with Small said to have stolen the show during her appearance with the jazz band.

At the end of 1950, the Ken Flannery led band had broken up again, with only occasional reunions across the next five years.

Ray Price reformed the Port Jackson Jazz Band and performed as a member between 1955 and 1962.

In 1960 the band were part of the 1st Annual Australian International Jazz Festival in Sydney, billed as "Ray Price & The Port Jackson Jazz Band". During the 1960s, they played regularly as a quartet at a hotel in Sydney, but would come together as a seven-piece for concerts or recordings. One of these recordings was Jazz Classics Volume 1, credited to Ray Price and his Port Jackson Jazz Band.

After Ray Price retired in 1982, he occasionally rejoined The Port Jackson Jazz Band for reunions until his death in 1990.

In 1988 the band reformed again with Ken Flannery as their only surviving original member. He was joined by pianist Dick Hughes, clarinetist John McCarthy, drummer Allan Geddes, bassists Wally Wickham and Harry Harmon. Later reunions featured other members, new and old.

== Lineup ==
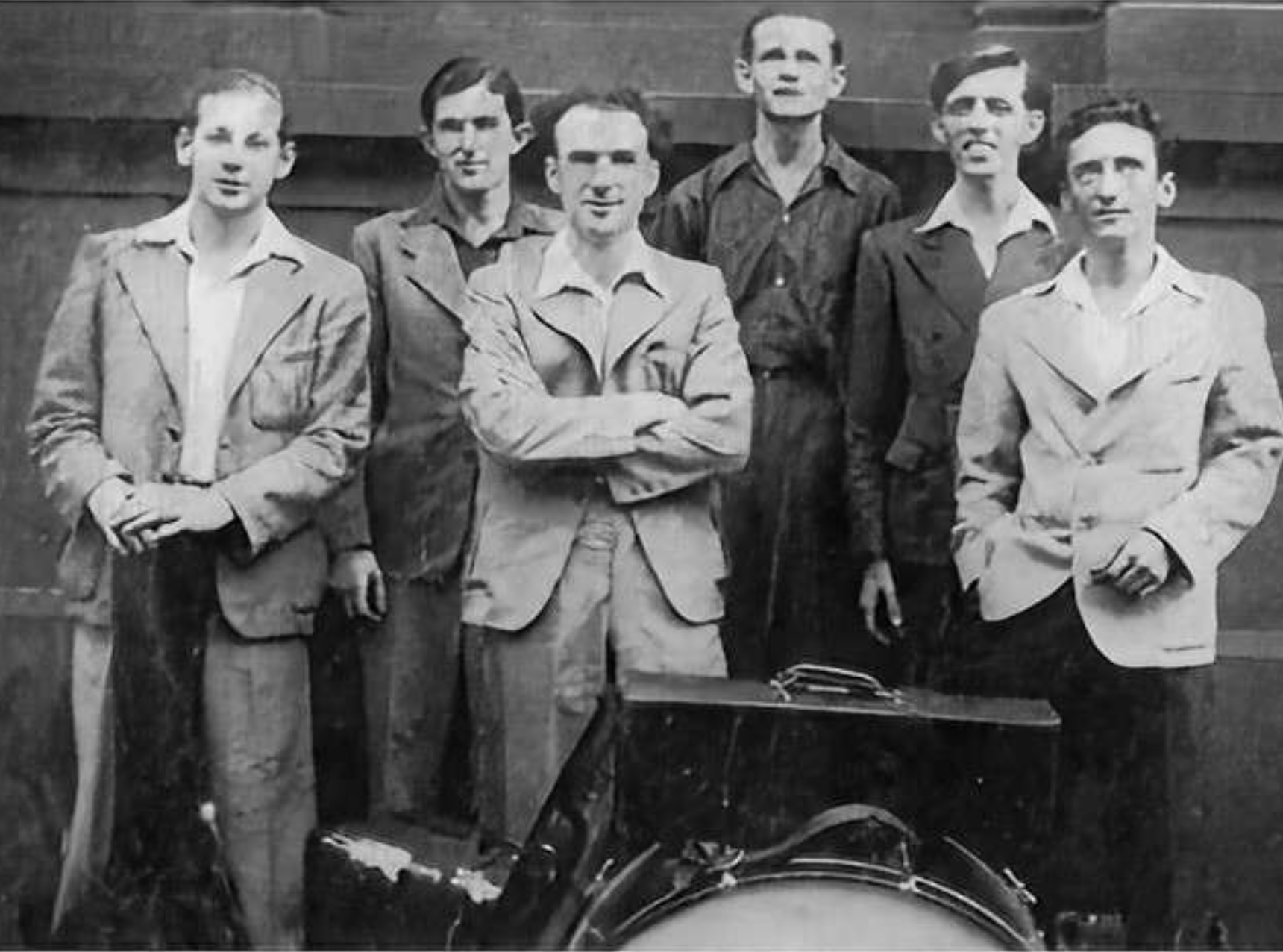
The 1944 Port Jackson Jazz Band: Jack Petty (clarinet), Jack Parkes (trombone), John Sweeney (bass), Ken Flannery (trumpet), Alfred Feeney (piano), Mal Cooper (drums).

The Port Jackson Jazz Band has had an evolving membership. Below are some past band members.

1944

Jack Parkes (trombone), Ken Flannery (trumpet).

1945

Jack Parkes (trombone), Ken Flannery (trumpet), Alf Freeney (piano), John Sweeney (banjo), Duke Farrell (bass, vocals), and Mal Cooper (drums).

1946

Jack Parkes (trombone), Ken Flannery (trumpet), Bob Cruikshanks (clarinet), Don Roberts (clarinet), Kevin Ryder (piano), Ron Hogan (bass), and Lynn Healey (drums).

1947

Ray Price (guitar, banjo), Ken Flannery (trumpet), James Somerville (piano), Johnny Rich (trombone), Bob Cruikshanks (clarinet), Clive Whitcombe (drums), Marie Harriett (vocals).

1948

Ken Flannery (trumpet), Dick Jackson (clarinet, tenor saxophone), Bob Rowan (trombone), James Somerville (piano), Ray Price (guitar), Len Evans (bass), and Clive Whitcombe (drums).

1949

Ken Flannery (trumpet), Dick Jackson (clarinet, tenor saxophone), Bob Rowan (trombone), James Somerville (piano), Ray Price (guitar), Len Evans (bass), Clive Whitcombe (drums), and Georgina de Deon (vocals).

1950

Ken Flannery (trumpet), James Somerville (piano), Les Nelson (trombone), John McCarthy (clarinet), George Harper (bass), Harry Shoebridge (guitar), and Clive Whitcombe (drums).

1955

Dick Hughes (piano), John McCarthy (clarinet), Francis John Willis (trombone)

1957

Bob Barnard (trumpet), Ray Price (guitar), Keith Silver (leader).

1961

Ken Flannery (trumpet), Johnny MacCarthy (clarinet), John Costello (trombone), Dick Hughes (piano), Wally Wickham (bass), Allan Geddes (drums), Ray Price (banjo and guitar), vocals by Katie Dunbar and Dick Hughes.

1990

Ken Flannery (trumpet), Johnny MacCarthy (clarinet), Norm Wyett (trombone), Terry Wilkinson (piano), Wally Wickham (bass), Allan Geddes (drums), Ian MacNamara (vocals).

== Discography ==
=== Albums ===
Title	Details
Jazzin' At The Con	Recorded: August 6, 1957; Released: 1958; Format: 10-inch LP; Label: Jazz Inc.
Dance To Dixieland	Recorded: November 1957; Released: 1958; Format: LP; Label: Columbia
Jazz Classics	Artist: Ray Price and his Port Jackson Jazz Band; Recorded: October 1961; Released: 1961; Format: 10-inch LP; Label: Pix
PIXieland Party	Artist: Ray Price and his Port Jackson Jazz Band; Recorded: November 1961; Released: 1961; Format: 10-inch LP; Label: Pix
