= Dick Hughes (musician) =

- Born: Richard Hughes; 8 July 1931; Brighton, Victoria, Australia
- Died: 20 April 2018 (aged 86) Vaucluse, New South Wales, Australia
- Genre: Jazz
- Occupations: Pianist, singer, journalist

Dick Hughes (1931–2018) was an Australian jazz pianist, singer and journalist.

Hughes earned two ARIA Award nominations for Best Jazz Album, in 1987 for The Last Train For Casablanca Leaves Once In A Blue Moon and in 2010 alongside his daughter Christa Hughes with Twenty First Century Blues. He also contributed a track (with Dick Hughes' Famous Five) to Jazz Live At Soup Plus which was nominated for the same award in 1989.

Hughes was born in Melbourne in 1931, the only son of Richard Hughes, a journalist, and his wife, May Hughes née Bennett. He developed an interest in jazz early in life and became president of the Melbourne University Rhythm Club in 1950. In 1952 he relocated to London for three years where he started working as a journalist, working for ABC, Frank Packer, News Limited and Fairfax community newspapers before retiring in 2014.

Hughes was a pianist and singer and played regularly around Sydney's jazz scene and played in multiple bands such as The Port Jackson Jazz Band and Ray price Quartet before first performing solo in 1973. He formed Dick Hughes' Famous Five and the released an album, Dick Hughes Looks Back & Around, in 1977.

In 1997 Hughes started presenting a jazz show, Speak Easy and Swing Hard, on 2MBS-FM.

Hughes married Fay in 1962 and together they had three daughters, Vashti, Christa and Stephanie.

== Discography ==
=== Albums ===
List of albums, with selected details
Title	Details
Piano Solos	Released: 1973; Format: LP; Label: Festival Records (L 25066)
Dick Hughes Looks Back & Around	Released: 1977; Format: LP; Label: 44 Records (6357716)
45 Years In Jazz! Merv Acheson 60th Birthday Concert (as The Dick Hughes' Famous Five with Merv Acheson)	Released: 1982; Format: LP; Label: 2MBS-FM (MBS JAZZ-1)
The Last Train for Casablanca Leaves Once in a Blue Moon	Released: 1986; Format: LP, Cassette; Label: Larrikin (LRJ176)
Twenty First Century Blues (with Christa Hughes)	Released: 2010; Format: CD; Label: ABC Music (273 1076)

== Awards and nominations ==
=== ARIA Music Awards ===
The ARIA Music Awards is an annual awards ceremony that recognises excellence, innovation, and achievement across all genres of Australian music. They commenced in 1987.

Year	Nominee / work	Award	Result	Ref.
1987	The Last Train For Casablanca Leaves Once In A Blue Moon	Best Jazz Album	Nominated	
2010	Twenty First Century Blues	Best Jazz Album	Nominated	
