= On Ice (Machine Gun Fellatio album) =

Studio album by Machine Gun Fellatio
- Released: 18 October 2004
- Genre: Alternative rock
- Length: 63:31
- Label: Festival

Machine Gun Fellatio chronology
Paging Mr. Strike (2002)	On Ice (2004)

Singles from On Ice
- 1. "You've Ruined All My Favorite Songs" Released: 2004; 2. "What the Fuck" Released: 2004

Professional ratings
Review scores
Source	Rating
AllMusic	2/5 stars
FasterLouder	(favorable)

On Ice is the third and final studio album by Australian alternative rock band Machine Gun Fellatio. The album was released on 18 October 2004 on Festival Records. The album debuted at No.36 on the Australian Album Chart in October 2004.

The album was later re-released which included a bonus DVD, featuring four live video tracks and two videos.

== Track listing ==
No.	Title	Length
1.	"Hollywood"	4:46
2.	"Qweeny"	3:42
3.	"Throw Me on the Bed"	3:07
4.	"Troublemaker"	3:04
5.	"Start Running"	3:14
6.	"Little Cutie"	3:05
7.	"(You've Ruined All My) Favourite Songs"	3:09
8.	"Bestfriend"	2:44
9.	"Fuckface"	0:52
10.	"Who's Got the Pills"	3:34
11.	"Came Home"	2:52
12.	"The Growing"	4:54
13.	"What the Fuck"	4:11
14.	"Pullover"	3:12
15.	"Positive Song"	3:24
16.	"These Days"	5:32
17.	"Slide On"	3:46
18.	"Stoner"	4:13
Total length:		63:31

Bonus DVD tracks
No.	Title	Length
1.	"Ex-Girlfriends Boyfriend" (live video)
2.	"Best Friend" (live video)
3.	"Qweeny" (live video)
4.	"Hollywood" (live video)
5.	"Voices in My Head" (video)
6.	"You've Ruined All My Favourite Songs" (video)

== Charts ==
Chart (2004)	Peak position
Australia (ARIA)	36
