= Heroes (Australian band) =

Australian band

- Origin: Australia
- Years active: 1980–2019
- Labels: Albert Productions
- Past members: Allan Cook; Jim Porteus; Mark Tinson; Peter De Jong; Phil Screen; Greg Dawson

Heroes were an Australian group from Newcastle, New South Wales.

They are mainly known for being the band playing the night of the Newcastle Star Hotel Riots.

In January 2015, the band released their second studio album So Far, which came with a bonus album of their 1980 debut.

== Discography ==
=== Albums ===
Title	Album details	Peak chart positions
Title	Album details	AUS
Heroes	Released: November 1980; Format: LP; Label: Albert Productions (APLP.047)	67
So Far	Released: January 2015; Format: 2xCD, DD, streaming; Label: Heroes	-

=== Singles ===
Year	Title	Peak chart positions	Album
Year	Title	AUS	Album
1980	"Baby's Had a Taste"/"Waiting for You"	76	Heroes
1981	"The Star and the Slaughter"/"End of the Road"	91	Heroes
1987	"Tearin' Out My Heart"	85	non album single
