= Jazz Live At Soup Plus =

Compilation album by Various artists
- Released: 1987
- Recorded: Soup Plus Restaurant, Sydney Town Hall
- Genre: Jazz
- Length: 70 min
- Label: MBS Jazz

Jazz Live At Soup Plus is a compilation album of jazz music released through 2MBS's Jazz label. It was recorded at Soup Plus Restaurant (A1-3, B1-2) and Sydney Town Hall (B3). The album was nominated for 1989 ARIA Award for Best Jazz Album.

== Track listing ==
1. Rhyth-a-ming - Bernie McGann Quartet
2. Turquoise - Peter Boothman Quartet
3. Some Day My Prince Will Come - Tom Baker Quartet
1. Memories Of You - Tom Baker Quartet
2. My Funny Valentine - Bruce Johnson Quartet
3. Jumping At The Woodside - Dick Hughes' Famous Five
