= Bring It On! (Machine Gun Fellatio album) =

Studio album by Machine Gun Fellatio
- Released: 29 September 2000
- Recorded: 1996–1999
- Genre: Alternative rock
- Length: 49:31
- Label: Mushroom
- Producers: 3k Short, Chit Chat von Loopin Stab

Machine Gun Fellatio chronology
Impossible Love (2000)	Bring It On! (2000)	Paging Mr. Strike (2002)

Singles from Album
- 1. "Impossible Dream" Released: 2000; 2. "Unsent Letter" Released: 2000; 3. "Mutha Fukka on a Motorcycle" Released: 2000; 4. "Summer" Released: 2001

Bring It On! is the debut studio album by Australian alternative rock band Machine Gun Fellatio. It was released in 2000 by record label Mushroom.

== Reception ==
Professional ratings
Review scores
Source	Rating
AllMusic	4.5/5 stars

Jody Macgregor of AllMusic wrote, "there's genuine songcraft to MGF and it's on display in Bring It On! more than anywhere else in their brief discography", and described the song "Unsent Letter" as "[a] bittersweet love song that sits comfortably among the best pop music Australian bands have ever produced".

== Track listing ==
Bring It On! track listing
No.	Title	Length
1.	"100 Fresh Disciples"	3:04
2.	"Not Afraid of Romance"	3:42
3.	"Drugsex"	4:08
4.	"Fore"	0:18
5.	"Mojo Pumping"	2:18
6.	"Summer"	3:49
7.	"Smooth Sexy Monkey"	0:30
8.	"Mutha Fukka on a Motorcycle"	2:20
9.	"I Dance Electric"	3:26
10.	"Blacklamb"	4:50
11.	"Horney Blonde Forty"	6:07
12.	"Butter My Arse with a Pigeon"	1:00
13.	"45"	2:46
14.	"Manywords"	3:48
15.	"Final Word"	2:13
16.	"Unsent Letter"	5:12

"Blacklamb" and "Horny Blonde Forty" were originally recorded as Limebunny (a pre-Machine Gun Fellatio band founded by Pinky Beecroft and Chit Chat von Loopin Stab) songs. The recordings of those songs on Bring It On! were taken from the compilation album Unsound Sounds, released in 1997 (the same recording of "Blacklamb" also appears on MGF's debut EP Love Comes to an End).

== Charts ==
Chart performance for Bring It On!
Chart (2000–2001)	Peak position
Australian Albums (ARIA)	78
