= Nellie Small =

Australian performer and jazz singer (1900–1968)

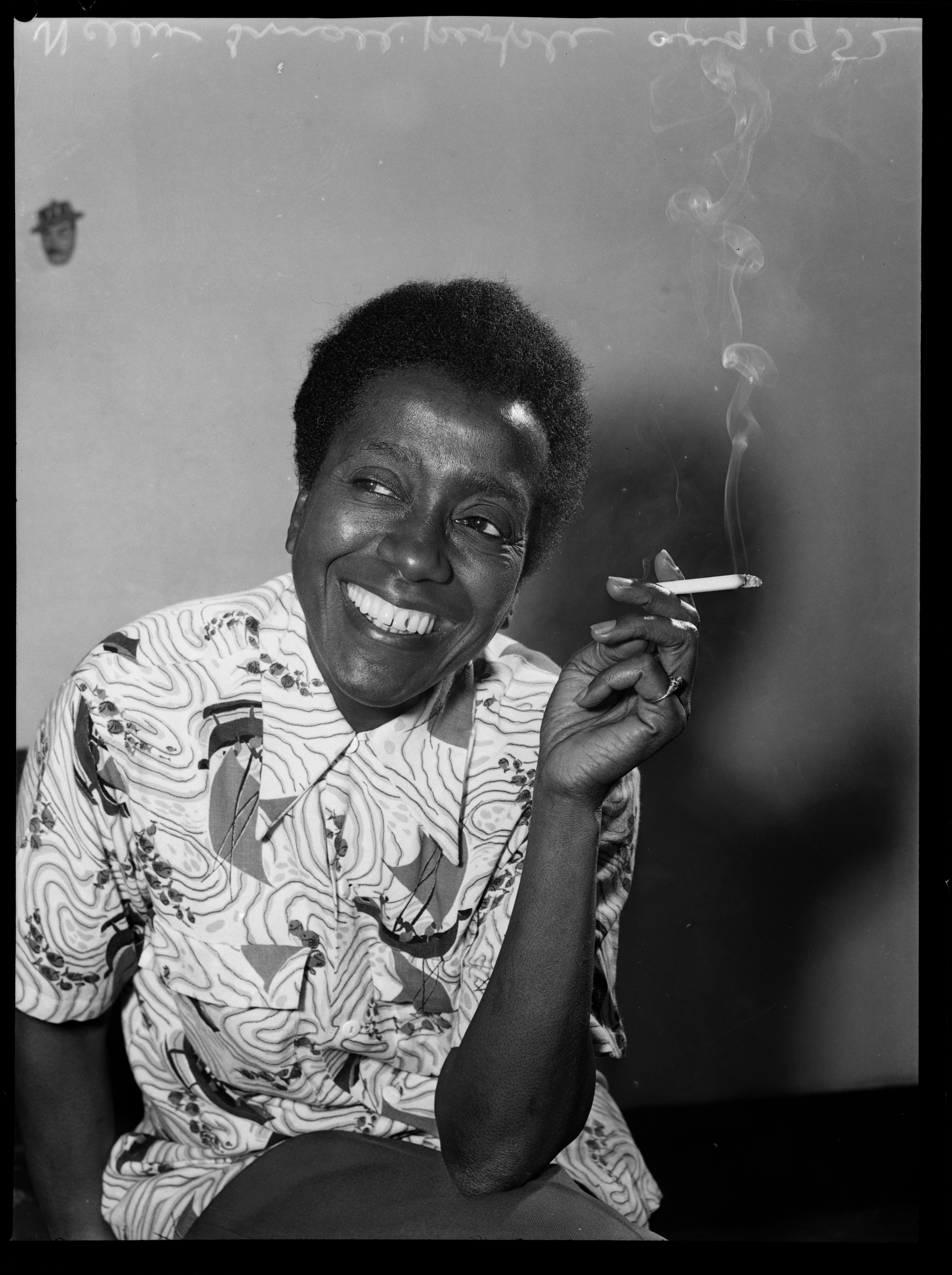
- Nellie Small, August 1952

Background information
- Born: 1900; Sydney, Australia
- Died: 1968 (aged 67–68)
- Occupation: Entertainer

Ellen E. Small (1900 – 1968), who performed as Nellie Small, was an Australian nightclub entertainer, jazz and blues singer, male impersonator and comic.

== Career ==
Born as Ellen E. Small in Sydney, Nellie Small said in radio interviews that her heritage was as an Australian/West Indian. Small attended Roman Catholic convent schools, including Sisters of the Good Samaritan, until leaving at the age of 16 to become a domestic servant and factory worker. She began her career in theatre during the 1920s after being offered a part in Cairo at Her Majesty's Theatre, Sydney. For the Melbourne production of Chu Chin Chow in March 1923, Small received praise as the "wife's attendant". She continued with the production in Perth in April and Sydney in May.

During the Great Depression, Small worked as a cleaner, floor-washer and laundress. After a period of no theatre work, in 1930 Small returned to the stage as a singer, often in men's clothing. From that time she lived in North Sydney with her talent manager Edith and the latter's husband Ted Meggitt, a furrier. Wearing men's clothing was initially a publicity stunt, but it developed into working as a male impersonator. As an actress she took a minor role in the comedy feature film Strike Me Lucky (1935). She sang blues and jazz standards at Sydney's Theatre Royal and the Tivoli in Melbourne, and later performed with The Port Jackson Jazz Band.

In the 1950s she toured New Zealand and recorded the song "The End of the Affair" (1955), which Clinton Walker described as a contender for Australia's first rock 'n' roll single. A painting of her by the artist Tibor Binder (born 1923) was shown in 1954 as the Picture of the Month at the Commonwealth Immigration Offices in Sydney Small was embroiled in an embargo against live entertainment in Sydney's pubs in 1954. The United Licensed Victuallers' Association, representing breweries, sought to ban live entertainers from performing as a distraction from customers drinking. Through the 1950s and 1960s she made appearances on TV, and continued to perform in clubs until 1964.

== Legacy ==
Alana Valentine based her 1991 two-hander play, Small Mercies, on Small's story. It was rejected by the Melbourne Theatre Company. Valentine then wrote a performance piece for the exhibition of photos of Small at the State Library of New South Wales in 2022. This grew into a Kabarett performance, Send for Nellie, directed by Liesel Badorrek, featuring Elenoa Rokobaro and Zara Stanton as music director of an all-female band, for the Sydney Festival in January 2024.
