= Chit Chat Von Loopin Stab =

Australian musician

- Born: Glenn Easton Dormand; Australia
- Genres: Pop, alternative
- Occupations: Musician, songwriter, television presenter, radio presenter
- Instrument: Keyboard
- Years active: 1988-present

Glenn Easton Dormand, also known as Chit Chat Von Loopin Stab, is an Australian songwriter, musician, record producer, remixer, TV presenter, radio announcer, podcaster and film director. He was one of the founding members of the band Machine Gun Fellatio. Chit Chat is also known for his presenting work on the Australian TV channel Max. Chit Chat co-wrote the lead singles off 4 albums in Rolling Stones Top 200 Aussies Albums of All Time including The Whitlams – "No Aphrodisiac" (Won the 1998 ARIA Award for Song of the Year). In 2003, Chit Chat and 3k Short wrote the original score for the Jonathon Teplitzky film Gettin' Square. For this they won the IF Award for Best Music and received an AFI Award nomination for Best Original Score. In 2019, he created the Stories of Our Town Film project, researching and directing 17 films, 4 of which have been picked up by commercial networks SBS and Foxtel.

== Television ==
Chit Chat was the primary artist interviewer for pay TV music channel Max. During his twelve years with the channel, he has interviewed over 800 acts, including Oasis, The Who, Foo Fighters, Slash, Mumford & Sons, Coldplay, Alicia Keys, Pink, Blondie, Stevie Nicks, Lionel Richie, Kylie Minogue, Noel Gallagher, Marilyn Manson and Lenny Kravitz. He has been involved with the following programs: The Know, The MAX Sessions, MAX Masters (also wrote the theme), MAX Recommends (also wrote the theme), Take Five and various specials, including Sound Relief, the APRA Awards and twice hosting the St Kilda Festival and AMP Awards. Before the show ended in 2009, Chit Chat was, at five years, the longest serving presenter on The Know.

After the death of Crowded House drummer Paul Hester in 2005, Chit Chat took over hosting duties of The MAX Sessions. The show has twice been honoured with an ASTRA Award.

Chit Chat was the narrator and conducted all of the interviews for this MAX Masters, an ASTRA Award-winning monthly music documentary that focuses on an individual artist.

Chit Chat also served as host for the benefit shows WaveAid and Sound Relief, both of which won ASTRA Awards and had viewing audiences of over 1.5m people.

Great Music Cities of the World is an 8-part documentary series researched and developed by Chit Chat from a title by Dorothy Markek. Over 18 months Chit Chat interviewed 210 artists on 3 continents. The series started airing in April 2012 and is in constant repeat.

In late Sept 2012 Chit Chat appeared on SBS's RocKwiz under his birth name of Glenn.

He has hosted the Australian Music Prize twice and The Rolling Stone Awards, as well as appearing as a presenter at the APRA and ASTRA awards.

== The Abstract History of Music (podcast) ==
Chit Chat is the writer and host of the podcast series. As the name suggest, the show focuses on strange and odd stories of life inside the music industry. It ranges from absurd demands made by artist to untold stories of the creation of songs. At its core is story telling, stories gathered from years of personal research, much of which Chit Chat claims he cataloged from "a thousand drunken backstage conversation".

== Film ==
In 2000 Chit Chat composed the score for Academy Award winner Lizzy Gardiner's documentary on director Stephan Elliott, Killing Priscilla.

In 2003, Chit Chat and 3k Short wrote the original score for the Jonathon Teplitzky film Gettin' Square. For this they won the IF Award for Best Music and received an AFI Award nomination for Best Original Score. The pair originally rejected this job but later agreed after seeing David Wenham's courtroom scene.

Chit Chat scored the 2010 documentary You Only Live Twice: The Incredible True Story of the Hughes Family, which won the AFI Award for Best Documentary Under One Hour.

In Sept of 2019 Chit Chat launched Stories of Our Town. A documentary series he's researching and directing about the history of Newcastle, NSW. The films are being produced by von Loopin Stab and Tony Whittaker of Carnivore Films. The site storiesofourtown.com was launched with the first film covering the Star Hotel riot. Of the series Chit Chat, who is Newcastle born and bred, has said "Newcastle is changing at a dramatic rate, unparalleled in its history and only by knowing where we’ve come from can we fully appreciate how far we’ve come. Our history needs to be preserved and it needs to be told by the people who lived it while they're still around to tell it". Biraban and Threlkeld: the Third Space was nominated for the 2022 National Trust (NSW) Heritage awards in the "Education and Interpretation" category.

Stories of Our Town films.

- The Star Hotel Riot, September 2019
- BHP Newcastle: A City Within a City, November 2019
- Scott Sisters of Ash Island, July 2020.
- The Murder of Burigon, November 2020.
- The Islanders: Chats with Vera Deacon, May 2021.
- Lycett & Wallis: Unlikely Preservers of Aboriginal Knowledge, May 2021
- Architecture of Newcastle Part 1: Civic Park Precinct, June 2021.
- Architecture of Newcastle Part 2: Roundhouse, June 2021.
- Architecture of Newcastle Part 3: War Memorial Cultural Centre. June 2021.
- Architecture of Newcastle Part 4: Churches of Menkens, June 2021.
- Architecture of Newcastle Part 5: Town Hall, July 2021.
- Architecture of Newcastle Part 6: NESCA House, July 2021.
- Architecture of Newcastle Part 7: Art Gallery, July 2021 -.
- Architecture of Newcastle Part 8: Civic Fountain, August 2021.
- The Castanet Club Story, October 2021.
- Fortress Newcastle: Life Under Threat, November 2021.
- Biraban & Threlkeld: Finding the Third Space, May 2022.
- More Than Hoons TBA

== Advertisements ==
Chit Chat and 3k Short have scored many award-winning and controversial TVC's:

- "Sperm Bank", "Bin Surfer" for Solo
- "Snakeskin Tampons" for Libra
- "Evolution" for TDK
- "Skater" for Cottee's
- "Pie Fight" for Davenport
- "Bucket Boy" for Hans

== Radio ==
From 2008 until 2010, Chit Chat presented two weekly shows: Planet Rock, which was syndicated to 56 stations nationally, and Homebrew, which appeared on Triple M.

== Music ==
Chit Chat has played in many bands including Vrag, The Libertines, Limebunny, The Hungarian Rap Sadists and Machine Gun Fellatio. Chit Chat was the vocalist and key songwriter in Vrag, under the name Chuck E Slimerod. The band played extensively in the inner Sydney suburbs during the late 80's early 90's. They released an EP "Still The Only Non Stimulating Anti-Obesity Drug" and a single "Regret" that received some airplay on Double J. In 1997, the album Unsound Sounds was released, self funded by von Loopin Stab and other band members. This was a collection of early works by Machine Gun Fellatio, Limebunny and The Libertines. Most of the tracks on the album were co-written and co-produced by Chit Chat von Loopin Stab. This was the first time the pseudonym appeared on an album. The album had only one single "Isaac or Fuzz" which was Machine Gun Fellatio's first well known track and ended up being one of the most played songs on Triple J in 1997. From the minor success of "Isaac or Fuzz" Machine Gun Fellatio became a live band and started working on their debut album Bring It On. All but one member Matt Ford had originally performed in Chit Chat's first band Vrag. In 1999. The Band released two Ep's "Love Comes to an End" and "For The Ladies" and three albums Bring It On (Gold), Paging Mr Strike (Platinum) and On Ice (Gold). Chit Chat served as songwriter, producer, samplist and occasional vocalist on all MGF's releases. On their weeks of release two of the singles "Rollercoaster" and "Pussytown" were the most added songs to Australian radio. Both these singles charted in the top ten of the Triple J Hottest 100. Because of their wild stage show MGF were favourites at Australian Music Festivals playing Big Day Out 02 and Big Day Out 03, including Homebake 00/01/02/04, Livid 01/02, the Woodford Folk Festival, Rock it, St Kilda Festival, and Gone South. They also toured in support of Primus, Robbie Williams, Duran Duran, Garbage and Kiss.

Chit Chat is an Aria Award-winning songwriter and an Ambassador for The Australian Performing Rights Association. Under his birth name co-wrote the lead singles off 4 of the albums on Rolling Stone's 200 Greatest Australian Albums of All Time list. "Rollercoaster" Paging Mr Strike by Machine Gun Fellatio, Fake That Emotion Sad But True by Tex, Don and Charlie, "No Aphrodisiac" Eternal Nightcap by The Whitlams and Chunky Chunky Air Guitar from Love This city also by The Whitlams

Chit Chat wrote many of the Machine Gun Fellatio hits including Unsent Letter and Rollercoaster. His other co-writes under the name Glenn Dormand include

- The Whitlams – "No Aphrodisiac" (with Tim Freedman, Matt Ford) (Won the 1998 ARIA Award for Song of the Year)
- The Whitlams – Chunky Chunky Air Guitar (With Matt Ford, Ross Johnson and Tim Freedman)
- Tex, Don and Charlie – "Fake That Emotion" (with Tex Perkins)
- The Grandmasters – "Love Dies Slow" (with Jackie Orzarcsky)
- The Grandmasters – "Light Off" (with Jackie Orzarcsky)
- The Grandmasters – "Holiday From Myself" (with Jackie Orzarcsky)
- Waikiki – "Mad and Beautiful" (with Juanita Stein)
- Pre.Shrunk – "Crash" (with Dave Morris)
- Pre.Shrunk – "All Day Sucker" (with Dave Morris)
- Pre.Shrunk – "Legend of the Fall" (with Dave Morris)

=== Remixes ===
- The Whitlams – "No Aphrodisiac"
- TISM – "Defecate on my face"
- Custard – "Apartment"
- Pre.Shrunk – "Hot Robots"

Chit Chat has teamed-up with longtime writing partner Scottie Scott and formed The StickUp Kids. Their EP Take on the World was released in 2010. They won an ABC Broadcasters Choice Award for the track "Make Time For Love" and were nominated for Best Rock Song at the 2010 Musicoz awards for "Blame It on the Rock n Roll".

== Adult films ==
Prior to Machine Gun Fellatio achieving success, Chit Chat provided scores for local adult films. According to Chit Chat: "We initially self-financed the band by doing porn soundtracks, which is funny and I don’t mind mentioning. It’s really hard to do porn. You think it’s going to be easy – you’re just going to get the wah pedal and knock it out, but you’ve pretty much got to write wall-to-wall sound and add dynamics for a 20-minute scene. It’s a lot of music."

== Present ==
Chit Chat is currently researching and directing a documentary series entitled Stories of Our Town with Carnivore Films' Tony Whittaker. The series focuses on the history of Newcastle, NSW and relies heavily on first hand storytelling. The films, funded by the Newcastle Port Community Contribution Fund, have been released for free on the Stories of Our Town YouTube channel.

== Personal life ==
Chit Chat has been married since 2005 and has two daughters. He and his family live in Newcastle, New South Wales. He is the uncle of comedian Rhys Nicholson.
