= Mervyn Acheson =

- Musical career
- Also known as: Merv Acheson
- Born: Mervyn Fletcher Acheson; March 31, 1922; Sydney, New South Wales, Australia
- Died: August 11, 1987 (aged 65)
- Genres: Jazz
- Occupations: Musician, composer, journalist
- Instruments: Tenor saxophone, alto saxophone, clarinet, violin
- Years active: 1937–1986
- Military career
- Service years: 1941–1945
- Rank: Private
- Service number: NX112245

Mervyn Fletcher Acheson (1922–1987) was a jazz musician and journalist from Sydney.

== Career ==
Born in Sydney, NSW on 31 March 1922, Mervyn Acheson studied violin from age four until age 11 until a broken arm caused him to stop. He switched to reeds and began working professionally at 15 at the Cairo Ballroom in Drummoyne. The following year, he contributed a regular jazz column to the Labor Daily newspaper as a cadet journalist, while continuing to perform jazz in dance halls. He later contributed another jazz column Swing Notes to Sydney's Daily News from January 1940 until June that year.

Acheson had been performing tenor sax and taught himself soprano sax and clarinet after he joined the army in October 1941 as a volunteer with 17th Battalion Military Band. He led the 116 Rhythm Ensemble's small jazz combo and then performed at the Booker T. Washington Club in Darlinghurst, which had been set up for visiting Black American servicemen. After Acheson was transferred to Canungra, Queensland for jungle training, he went AWOL and returned to the club. No one realised he was missing until a shooting brought Acheson to the attention of authorities. After serving time in jail, Acheson was discharged from the Army in 1945.

During the 1940s and 50s, Acheson continued his work as a journalist and contributed to Tempo (where he was editor for a time), Music Maker, Syncopation, and Pictorial Show. He became known for his strong opinions on jazz, such as an article on the Sydney jazz scene published by Tempo in 1952 which was then quoted in The Sunday Herald. Acheson wrote that "the Sydney Swing Club is dead, rotting in a grave dug by a handful of mouldy figges".

He contributed an autobiographical series to Jazz Magazine beginning in 1982. Across thirteen issues, "The Merv Acheson Story" was published until 1986. A fourteenth article was submitted, but it was lost when the magazine ceased publication.

In 1985, aged 63, Acheson was considered one of the most competent jazz musicians in Australia. At the time he was performing with the Bob Bernard Quartet.

After a series of medical operations and boughts of ill health, Acheson retired from music. He died in Sydney 11 August 1987. He was memorialised in 'Blues for Merv'.

== Family ==
Merv Acheson's father Robert Edward Acheson was a professional musician. He composed a song titled "I'm On the Dole" which was registered for copyright in August 1931. It is held by the National Archives of Australia.
