= Matt Ford (writer) =

Australian singer

- Also known as: Pinky Beecroft
- Born: Sydney, New South Wales, Australia
- Genres: Alternative rock, experimental
- Occupations: Musician, screenwriter
- Instruments: Vocals, piano, keyboards
- Years active: 1985–present

Matt Ford, who sometimes uses the stage name Pinky Beecroft, is an Australian screenwriter, singer-songwriter, and performer.

From 1997 to 2005 he was the lead singer and keyboardist for alternative rockers Machine Gun Fellatio. His group Pinky Beecroft and the White Russians released an album, Somethin' Somewhere Better, in August 2008. As a songwriter he co-wrote "No Aphrodisiac" with bandmate Chit Chat Von Loopin Stab and The Whitlams' Tim Freedman.

He has written scripts for a number of television series, most recently Underbelly: Vanishing Act (2022) and Warnie (2023), and has also worked as a producer.

== Music ==
He was the lead singer and songwriter of Australian band Machine Gun Fellatio. He quit the band in 2005, at which point the group split up. He became the lead singer of Pinky Beecroft and The White Russians and released a self-titled EP and a full-length album entitled Somethin' Somewhere better and Pretty Black.

He made a number of appearances on the ABC television series The Glass House.

Ford co-wrote the song "No Aphrodisiac". The song was recorded by The Whitlams and went on to win an ARIA Award for Song of the Year.

== Writing ==
Under his birthname, Matt Ford, he has written for a number of TV series, including Farscape, a popular US-Australian TV series broadcast on the Sci-Fi channel, and Sweat, which starred Heath Ledger.

His writing credits also include the long-running Australian series Stingers, Love Is a Four Letter Word, Medivac, Wildside, G.P., and Lochie Leonard.

He was the writer of ROAD, a telefeature for SBS Independent, produced by Enda Murray and Lisa Duff and using an all-Indigenous Australian cast and crew. It screened on SBS-TV.

He wrote the screenplay for the documentary feature Killing Priscilla, directed by Academy-Award winner Lizzie Gardiner and screened in Australia, the UK, and the US.

His writing credits also include Frankies House, (an Australian-US-UK co-production), Sea Patrol, and the Showtime series Satisfaction. He was also referenced in the Satisfaction episode "Pony Girl"; while Heather is watching the film clip to the song "Roller Coaster" by MGF, she mentions that the lead singer thinks she's paranoid.

His feature film screenplays include Prodigal Son and Twisted Sister.

He co-wrote the book A Grown-up Guy's Guide to Life with Joan Sauers.

His short stories were featured in a marketing campaign for a 2011 Elle Macpherson lingerie range.

He hosted the WPA World Nine-ball Championship on ABC TV and worked with Chaser member Charles Firth on his satire-driven Manic Times.

More recently, he co-wrote the series Underbelly: Vanishing Act (2022) and Warnie.

== Other activities ==
He has appeared on the Network Ten series The Panel and on In Siberia Tonight on SBS-TV.

== Awards and nominations ==
With Machine Gun Fellatio, Ford was nominated for an ARIA Award for Best New Song for "The Girl of My Dreams Is Giving Me Nightmares" in 2003.

At the ARIA Music Awards of 1998, "No Aphrodisiac" won Song of the Year for The Whitlams.

In 2011, he won the Australian Writers' Guild's John Hinde Award for Excellence in Science Fiction Writing at the AWGIEs for Panic at Rock Island
