= Star Hotel riot =

1979 riot in Australia

The Star Hotel riot
- Date: 19 September 1979 - 20 September 1979; 10:00pm
- Location: Newcastle, New South Wales
- Caused by: Enforcement of the Star Hotel's 10 pm closing time
- Methods: Assault, vandalism, arson and general violence
- Result: Riots quelled

Parties
Locals	NSW Police

Number
4000	

Casualties
- Deaths: 0
- Injuries: 14 policemen, 8 civilians
- Charged: 28

The Star Hotel riot, occasioned by the closing of a popular pub, was one of the largest riots in Australian history. An estimated 4,000 people fought with police on the streets of Newcastle, New South Wales on the night of 19 September 1979.

== History ==
The Star Hotel was originally built in the West End district of Newcastle, Australia near the corner of present-day Devonshire street by Ewen Cameron who was born in Scotland and arrived in Sydney, Australia in 1838. He purchased the land and erected the building in 1855 from money made at the Rockhampton gold rush. The Star Hotel was originally known as the Star Inn or Cameron's Inn. After the death of Ewen in 1890 his son Hugh Cameron purchased the Star and in 1910 demolished the original inn. A brand new two-storey brick hotel was built in its place.

In 1920 Hugh's eldest daughter Lena Campbell purchased the star from her father. Lena decided to lease the premises to Tooth and Co. who then subleased the hotel to publicans. Additional renovation work was carried out on the building in the 1920s. The Star was in the Cameron family for nearly 80 years when in 1934 Lena Campbell agreed to sell it to Tooth and Company Limited.

For many years the Star was frequented by visiting seamen to the city of Newcastle. In the late 1960s the King street bar which was known as the Star's back bar, was opened to gay and lesbian patrons. The drag shows and all male revues performed at the Star were so popular that it led to a bigger stage being built. This became known as the middle bar.

In the 1970s the Star became a popular pub for young people, university students and for the performing of live music. Don Graham took over as the licensee in December 1973 and decided to introduce live rock and roll bands six nights a week. Only local bands were employed to play. The Star quickly became the place to visit with many famous bands playing at the hotel with Benny and the Jets being closely associated with the establishment. In 1979 Don Graham chose to ban homosexuals from entering the Star which lead to the gay and lesbian community picketing outside protesting the ban.

The owners, Tooth and Co. closed the bar with one week's notice. On 12 September 1979, George Spencer Tooth's commercial manager announced that the Star would close on the night of Wednesday, 19 September 1979. The hotel had been in disrepair and Tooth and Co. claimed it was financially better to demolish the building rather than upgrade it to the standards required by the licensing authorities. This inspired a protest campaign and patrons were able to arrange a petition that gained 10,000 signatures but this was not enough to stop the closure of the hotel.

As of June 1st, 2023 the Star Hotel has been transformed into a queer bar known as 'Bernies' in reference to Bernie's Wine Bar (A staple of gay venues in the 70's).

== Riot ==
On the day of 19 September 1979, live music started from 12 midday. The pub had 3 bars. The front bar was called the Seamans bar, the middle bar was for gay and transgender people and the back bar was on King street where the rock bands played. The back bar was small so on the night most of the people were outside. It is estimated that there were between 2000 and 5000 people present near the Star Hotel that night. At 10 pm police cars, paddy wagons and the big prison van drove through the crowd on King street and stopped outside the bar. General duties officers had to sort out the traffic problems caused by the larger than normal crowd numbers and enforce the hotel's 10 pm closing time. Police who first attended the Hotel made their way through the crowd and into the back bar, where one officer signalled to the band to stop playing. The band Heroes were on their last song of the night when 2 police officers entered and jumped the bar. One of the police officers grabbed the microphone stand and shook it several times hitting lead singer Pete de Jong in the mouth. Pete de Jong was later arrested for calling the police pigs. Heroes band members included Pete de Jong (vocals/guitar), Mark Tinson (guitar/vocals), Jim Porteus (bass/vocals), Phil Screen (Drums).

As a result of stopping Heroes from playing the crowd turned against the police. Windows in the hotel's King street and Devonshire Lane bars were smashed and streamers torn down. People left the back bar and joined the huge crowd in King Street, where even more numbers were increased by spectators from the nearby Newcastle Workers Club, who came out in hundreds to see what was going on. People started throwing bottles and cans at the police and their vehicles. The police began arresting people and placed them in the paddy wagon and the prison van. At about 10:30 pm police started to retreat to their vehicles and withdrew along King street to Union street. They were followed by a crowd of hundreds of people continuing to throw cans and bottles. The police stopped at the Union street intersection with the strong crowd advancing upon them. The crowd forced the police along King street to Auckland street. The police regrouped outside the Newcastle City Hall as the rioters went back to the Star Hotel. During the riot 2 men from the crowd opened the door of the prison van and released 1 of the arrested people. The person ran into the crowd but was intercepted by 4 policemen who returned him to the prison van. The doors of the van were once again opened later as police tried to stop people from the crowd helping those arrested.

As the riot continued a group of people overturned a white police car at 11 pm. Petrol started coming out of the car and spilled onto the road. The petrol was set on fire causing the white car and the police paddy wagon near the tipped over white car to also catch on fire. Police officer Paul Baker checked that no-one was in the paddy wagon. Paul received a bravery award for risking his safety. The fire department were called to put out the fire. These 14 firemen included ten from Cooks Hill and four from Hamilton. Firemen were pelted with rocks and masonry as they tried to put out the fires and were forced to use hoses on the rioters to protect themselves. When the car fires were extinguished the police at 11:30 pm were able to use a hose on the rioters, forcing them back. Enough police were then able to form a line and force the rioters back. The riot ran for over two hours.

Footage of the riot was captured by the NBN television station night crew. The reporter Robyn Wade and the cameraman Barry Nancarrow won a TV Logie award for "Best News Report Star Hotel Riot - NBN 3 Newcastle". The footage shot by NBN was used by the police to identify rioters.

After the riot fourteen policemen and eight civilians were injured. A total of twenty-eight people were charged with 100 offences. Charges included riotous behaviour, assaulting police, resisting arrest, malicious injury to property and offensive behaviour. Police vehicles worth $40,000 were burnt out. Keith Campbell the superintendent of the Hunter District Ambulance Service reported that 22 people were taken to the Royal Newcastle Hospital with no serious injuries, only cuts and bruises.

== Popular culture ==
The Star Hotel closure was the subject of the song "Star Hotel" by Australian band Cold Chisel, from their 1980 album East.

On the night the Heroes prophetically played the song "Star and the Slaughter". The song was written by a previous bass player in the band Allan Cook in 1978 a year before the riot. The song had nothing to do with the riot.

A documentary about The Star Hotel Riot was produced for the Stories of Our Town project and released in 2019.
