= Christa Hughes =

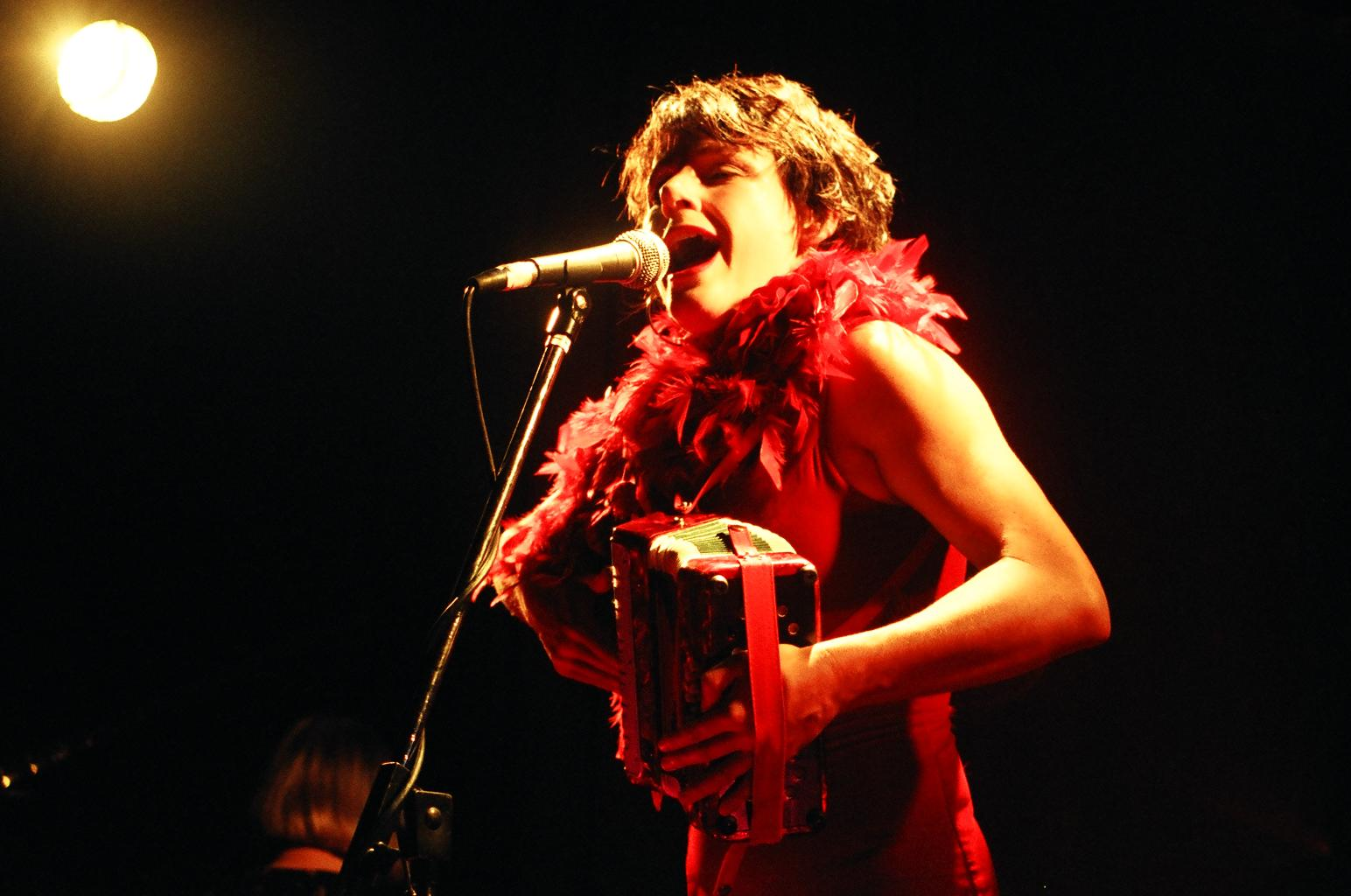

Background information
- Also known as: KK Juggy
- Born: Christa Teresa Hughes; Sydney, New South Wales, Australia
- Genres: Jazz; blues; alternative rock
- Occupations: Singer, circus performer, comedian
- Instrument: Vocals
- Years active: 1985–present
- Website: www.christahughes.world

Christa Teresa Hughes is an Australian singer, circus performer and comedian. From the age of 15, Christa performed with her late father, jazz pianist, journalist and broadcaster, Dick Hughes. From 2000 to 2005 she was the nude roller skating singer, KK Juggy, for rock band Machine Gun Fellatio and then until 2008 the Ring Mistress with Circus Oz. During her solo career, Christa has regularly sung jazz and blues, created and starred in numerous musical theatre and cabaret shows, performed on television and appeared in films. She has recorded three albums, Sleepless Beauty (2004) with The Surgeons, 21st Century Blues (2010) with her father, Dick, and Shonky (2011) with the Honky Tonk Shonks.

== Life and career ==
=== Early life ===
Christa Hughes was raised in the Sydney suburb of Vaucluse. Her father, Richard "Dick" Hughes, was a journalist and jazz pianist. Hughes later recalled that her parents "were hard-working people, we just happened to live in a posh suburb. In fact, I think the suburb tried to have us moved out several times because we were the noisiest household on the block." She is a granddaughter of the journalist and writer, Richard Hughes (1906–1984) and his wife, May Hughes née Bennett.

=== Jazz and Blues ===
Christa started singing jazz and blues at the age of 15 with her father, Dick. "I really wanted to sing but I didn't want people to watch me do it," she says. "I completely grew out of that." By the early 90s, Dick and Christa had a regular set offering "raucous Sunday afternoons" at the Shakespeare Hotel in Surry Hills. She continued to perform with Dick at various times throughout her career, appearing at The Famous Spiegeltent (Sydney Opera House) in 2008, with "the duo's repertoire guided by the family's favourite songbirds, Bessie Smith, Billie Holiday and Lee Wiley." They provided a "wonderful night of jazz and blues for those with a taste for a modern twist." and were "bloody funny buggers, to boot!" In 2010, they released the album 21st Century Blues together and performed their Speakeasy Sundays at the Sydney Opera House. When, after Dick's death, Christa was discussing one of her own productions, she suggested that "the show would never even exist if he hadn't shared his passion for song with his daughter."

Christa opened and sang with various international blues artists when they were in Sydney, such as Brownie McGhee, The Swamp Boogie Queen Katie Webster and Champion Jack Dupree. After she turned 21, Hughes travelled the world, singing in New York, Edinburgh, London and Paris.

In 2011, she released Shonky with the Honky Tonk Shonks.

=== Cabaret Shows and Musical Theatre ===
Christa has written and starred in several musical theatre shows, generally producing these as well.

Mongrel (1999) won Best Comedy/Drama at the New York International Fringe Festival.

Sleepless Beauty (2002)

A dark comedy cabaret commissioned by the Sydney Opera House, Sleepless Beauty was described as "a German cabaret-meets-Hollywood musical that takes apart the surgery-enhanced beauty myth. It has serious intent, lacerating and lampooning a culture where your body isn't a temple, but a construction site waiting for the next renovation." Sleepless Beauty had a successful Opera House run in 2002 and was performed at the Adelaide Cabaret Festival. Although not to everybody's taste, it was said to be "exceptionally strong music theatre." The songs were written by Hughes and composer Michael Lira. A CD of the soundtrack was released in 2004.

Beer Drinking Woman (2003)

Beer Drinking Woman was performed around Australia in venues including the Sydney Opera House, Adelaide Cabaret Festival and the Brisbane Powerhouse.

Temptation (2008)

Initially inspired by the 1930s American film Reefer Madness, it contained references performed in a melodramatic, film noir style. As well as her own songs, Temptation's repertoire included compositions by Tom Waits, Cole Porter, The Velvet Underground, Beasts Of Bourbon, Marilyn Manson and Grace Jones. Christa suggested that "Once you can't do something, all of a sudden there's a desire".

Neurotic Ladyland (2013)

Oz Rockin’ the Ladies Lounge (2015)

The World According to Farts (2017)

Originally commissioned by Casula Powerhouse Arts Centre, The World According to Farts was a show which included audience participation.

Parlour Noir (2022 - Present)

The One With The Great Big O In The Middle Of It (2023)

A performance of Christa's absurdist script written for the Powerhouse's substantial 1001 Remarkable Objects publication, following an invitation to "interrogate a specific slice of the exhibition and respond to one or more of the remarkable objects that resonated with them".

=== Machine Gun Fellatio and Other Bands ===
Doppelgängers (1987)

Christa's first rock band.

Machine Gun Fellatio (2000 to 2005, 2024)

Hughes is perhaps best known as her alter ego, KK Juggy, the cartwheeling, often nude chanteuse of Machine Gun Fellatio. The band toured the country extensively. This led to a ban by the University of Melbourne. MGF recorded three albums for Mushroom records (one earned Gold status, one Platinum).

MGF reformed for three shows in Australia during late 2024 playing the Riverstage (Brisbane, 20 October), Sidney Myer Music Bowl (Melbourne, 9the November) and the Hordern Pavilion (Sydney, 29 November), accompanying TISM, Eskimo Joe, Ben Lee and The Mavis's. "KK Juggy took to the stage alone, her gold jacket glittering in the dark, and opened with an acapella performance of '(Let Me Be Your) Dirty F...ing Whore'". Then, for MGF as a whole, the "outrageous lyrics seamlessly blend with catchy melodies and the crowd is absolutely smothered in sticky, sweet nostalgia."

The Loud Hailers

Christa performs regularly The Loud Hailers, along with Ben Fink (guitar) and Ivan Jordan (drums).

=== Other Live Performances ===
Museum Of Accidents (1990)

Christa performed in Open City Theatre’s Museum Of Accidents at the Performance Space.

Go-Go Burlesco (2005)

Christa was the MC and also performed her own solo pieces.

Eternity Man (Concert version) (2005)

Christa played a brothel madam, Myrtle, in this chamber opera. Composed by Jonathan Mills, libretto by Dorothy Porter and conducted by Richard Gill The Eternity Man is the "story of Arthur Stace, the quintessentially Sydney eccentric who, with his coloured chalk, scrawled the word 'Eternity' on walls, footpaths and railway platforms for 35 years." Eternity Man was first performed at the Sydney Opera House for the Sydney Festival.

Circus Oz (2006 to 2008)

Christa was with Circus Oz, touring nationally and internationally with the troupe for two years.

How to Kill Your Husband (and other handy household hints) (2011)

Christa was cast at sex therapist, Bianca, in Victorian Opera’s adaptation of Kathy Lette’s book of the same name. Conducted by Richard Gill.

Hidden Sydney – The Golden Mile (2016 to 2018)

Christa played the role of Judy Garland in an immersive theatre performance.

InSide Out Lightbox (2020)

A collaboration with Arianna Bosi / Dashboard Animals, the InSide Out Lightbox was a multimedia performance piece where Christa played a mermaid.

The Marrickville Mermaid (2022)

Christa played Annette Kellerman in The Marrickville Mermaid (Hilary Bell & Luke Styles) performed at The Marrickville Aquatic Centre. Described as "An original song cycle about The Million Dollar Mermaid Annette Kellerman - Australian champion swimmer, inventor of the modern one-piece bathing suit and star of underwater ballet, Hollywood films and international vaudeville."

=== Film and TV ===
Away With Words (1999)

Christa was cast in cinematographer Christopher Doyle’s Hong Kong arthouse film, Away With Words, premiering at the Cannes Film Festival. It was a "film about a Japanese man who arrives in Hong Kong and plants himself at a local gay bar inhabited by a cast of eccentric characters."

The Eternity Man (2008)

After the success of the concert version, Christa again starred as brothel madam, Myrtle, in the film adaptation of The Eternity Man, directed by Julien Temple and produced by Rosemary Blight. "The story of Arthur Stace, The Eternity Man runs like a song-line through 20th century Sydney history. Spanning four decades, Arthur Stace's nocturnal mission to chalk his timeless message on the city streets somehow captured its changing soul, and to this day his journey remains its quintessential urban legend." The film screened at the Locarno Film Festival and won the Rose d’Or award for Best Performing Arts program (2009).

You Only Live Twice - The Incredibly True Story of the Hughes Family (2010)

Covering four generations of the Hughes family, You Only Live Twice - The Incredibly True Story of the Hughes Family was directed by Brendan Young and produced by Ruth Cullen. It "takes us on an intimate, whirlwind journey through the ages, revealing the complexities and duality within this prodigiously talented, eccentric maverick clan who've pursued their passions on the world stage" and "gave the family's history in jazz, journalism and cabaret a wider audience." It was the AFI award winning documentary in 2010.

TV Performances

Christa's other TV work has included appearances on Spicks and Specks (2010), Q+A (2012), Sideshow (three appearances in 2007), The Glass House (2001), Love Is A Four Letter Word (2001), Eurovision Quiz Show (2014) and Beauty And The Beast (2001 to 2002). There was also an appearance on the UK's Channel 4 production Eurotrash, "a personal triumph".

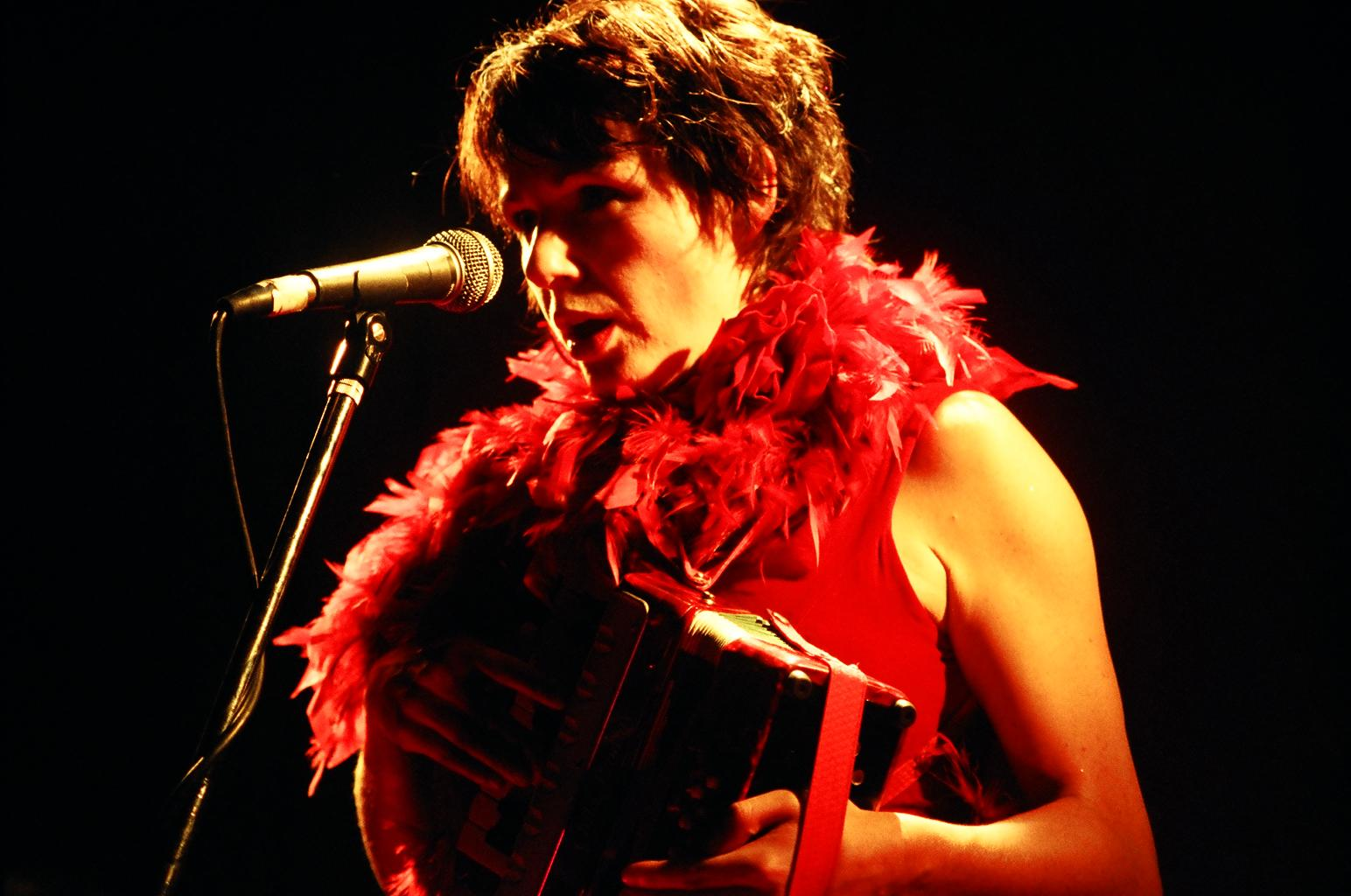

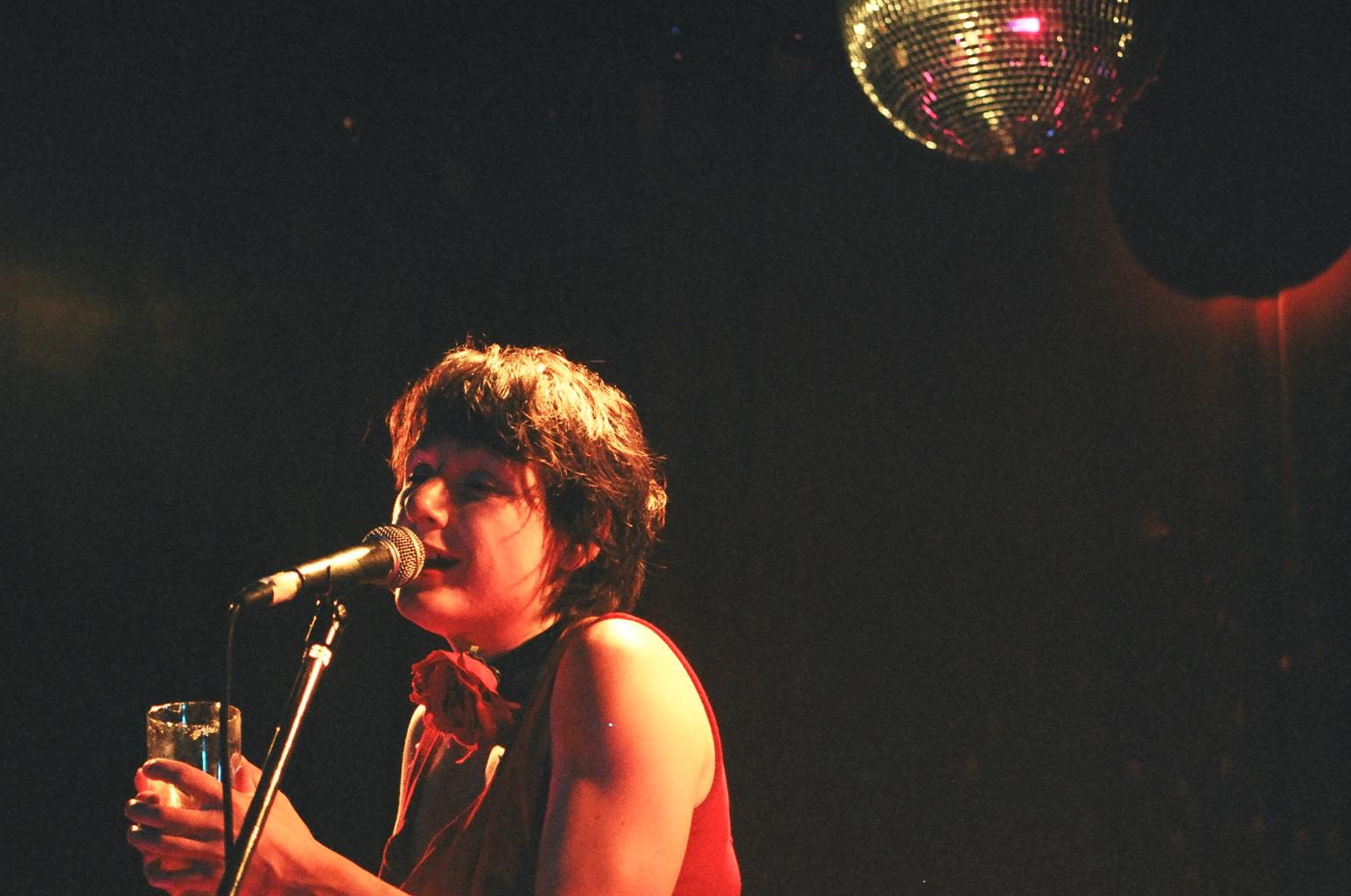

== Discography ==
=== Albums ===
List of albums, with selected details
Title	Details
Sleepless Beauty (with The Surgeons)	Released: 2004; Format: CD; Label: Ear Pimp Music (EPM-52004)
Twenty First Century Blues (with Dick Hughes)	Released: 2010; Format: CD; Label: ABC Music (273 1076)
Shonky (with The Honky Tonk Shonks)	Released: 2011; Format: CD; Label: ABC Music (278 7261)

=== Extended plays ===
List of EPs, with selected details
Title	Details
Carrot Day	Released: 2001; Format: CD; Label: Christa Hughes

== Awards and nominations ==
=== ARIA Music Awards ===
The ARIA Music Awards is an annual awards ceremony that recognises excellence, innovation, and achievement across all genres of Australian music. They commenced in 1987.

Year	Nominee / work	Award	Result	Ref.
2010	Twenty First Century Blues	Best Jazz Album	Nominated	
