= Richard Hughes (journalist) =

Australian journalist (1906–1984)

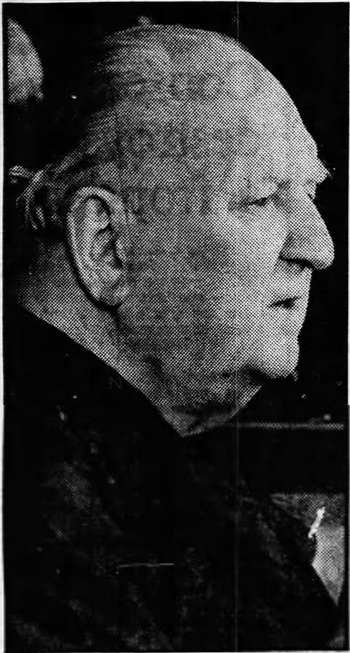
- Born: Richard Joseph Hughes; 5 March 1906; Prahran, Melbourne, Australia
- Died: 4 January 1984 (aged 77); Hong Kong
- Occupation: Journalist

Richard Joseph Hughes CBE (5 March 1906 – 4 January 1984) was an Australian journalist who spent much of his life in the Far East as correspondent for The Times, The Economist and the Far Eastern Economic Review. He was the inspiration for the fictional character Dikko Henderson in Ian Fleming's James Bond novel You Only Live Twice, and for "Old Craw" in John le Carré's The Honourable Schoolboy.

== Early life ==
Hughes was born on 5 March 1906 at Prahran, Melbourne, Australia. He was the eldest child of Richard Hughes, a salesman, and his wife Katie, née McGlade.

== Career ==
His working life began at the Victorian Railways and he acquired his first journalistic experiences as a writer for the house magazine The Victorian Railways Magazine which is where he acquired the poetic style of writing for which he later became famous. He later worked within the Frank Packer organisation.

Hughes was a war correspondent in the North African campaign of World War II and the Korean and Vietnam wars. In 1940 he was based in Tokyo and warned that Japan was likely to enter the war against the Allies.

In 1942, Hughes and several colleagues at the Sunday Telegraph were banned from the Canberra Press Gallery for several months after publishing an article which mocked members of the Senate and Senate clerk Robert Broinowski.

After the Second World War he worked first from Japan and then from Hong Kong where, in addition to his journalistic work, he was generally considered to be a British spy and by some to be a double agent.

In 1956 he achieved a major international scoop when he located and interviewed the British spies and former diplomats Guy Burgess and Donald Maclean in Moscow, who in 1951 had defected to the Soviet Union.

Variously described as "flamboyant" and "larger than life", Hughes spent forty years reporting from the Far East. He was seen as the "doyen of the Far East foreign press corps" and a stalwart of the Hong Kong Foreign Correspondents' Club.

Hughes authored several books, including Hong Kong, Borrowed Place, Borrowed Time (1968), which opens with his oft-quoted description of the Hong Kong of that period as "a rambunctious, free-booting colony, naked and unashamed, devoid of self pity, regrets or fear of the future".

== Personal life ==
Hughes was married three times: firstly, to May Lillian Bennett in 1930, the marriage ending with her suicide in 1933; secondly, to Adele, née Redapple, in 1945, which ended with her death in 1950; and thirdly, in 1973 to Oiying (Ann) Lee.

He died in Hong Kong in January 1984 of kidney and liver diseases.

His son from his first marriage, Richard (Dick) Hughes, was a journalist, jazz pianist and broadcaster. One of his granddaughters, Christa Hughes, is a singer, circus performer and comedian.

== Books by Richard Hughes ==
- The Chinese Communes: A Background Book (London: The Bodley Head, 1960)
- Hong Kong, Borrowed Place, Borrowed Time: Hong Kong and Its Many Faces (London: Andre Deutsch, 1968; 2nd revised edition, Andre Deutsch, 1976)
- Foreign Devil: Thirty Years of Reporting from the Far East (London: Andre Deutsch, 1972; reprinted: Century Publishing, 1986)
