= Machine Gun Fellatio =

Australian alternative rock band

Background information
- Origin: Sydney, New South Wales, Australia
- Genres: Alternative rock, experimental
- Years active: 1997–2005, 2024
- Members: Bryan Ferrysexual; Chit Chat Von Loopin Stab; KK Juggy; LoveShark; Pinky Beecroft; The Widow Jones; 3k Short
- Past members: Feyonce

Machine Gun Fellatio (also known by the censored initialism MGF) were an Australian alternative rock band, formed in 1997. They are well known for their provocative on-stage antics and humorous lyrics. Their outrage-provoking name (coined by an early associate of the band who devised the term from a philosophy exercise) gives some idea of the attitude that pervades the band's work. They released three studio albums, three EPs and three singles before disbanding in 2005. In 2024, however, they reformed for three shows.

== History ==
=== 1997–1999: Formation and Love Comes to an End ===
Machine Gun Fellatio were formed when members of two Sydney bands, Vrag and Limebunny, combined in 1997. The bands had previously collaborated on various projects and released a compilation record titled Unsound Sounds, which featured Vrag's track "Isaac or Fuzz". This track incorporates segments of a voice message left on a record company's answering machine, inquiring about the song identified by the lyric "Da da da da..." The composition primarily features a vocal rendition of the melody "Reach Up" by Perfecto Allstarz, a project associated with Paul Oakenfold, set to an upbeat dance rhythm.

In an interview Glenn Dormand (a.k.a. Chit Chat Von Loopin Stab) explained: "We got a wrong number on our answering machine. We rang the number back. It was a local Pizza Hut. Basically, they said 'Isaac hasn't been here for a long time, and Fuzz isn't reliable either'." The song received significant airplay on national youth broadcaster Triple J. To capitalise on the success of the song they consolidated the band lineup, with Dave Arroyo and Glenn Dormand (Chit Chat Von Loopin Stab) on vocals and keyboards, Warrick Leggo (LoveShark) on guitar and Ross Johnston (3kShort) on bass, guitar and keyboards, and released their debut EP Love Comes to an End.

There were reportedly less than 500 copies of Love Comes to an End in existence. Matt Ford (Pinky Beecroft) once stated in an interview that the band dumped boxes of their first EP in a skip bin when they realised they would never sell them. This EP is also referred to as Isaac or Fuzz, after their record label stuck stickers proclaiming that it contained the single "Isaac or Fuzz" to try to increase sales by capitalising on the airplay of the song on Triple J.

Ford later joined the band as singer, keyboardist, after leaving Limebunny and turning down an offer to join the band The Whitlams, with whom he helped write their hit song, "No Aphrodisiac", together with Dormand. The band was also joined by Christa Hughes (KK Juggy – the Ks standing for "knickers" and "knockers"), Glenn Abbott (Bryan Ferrysexual) on drums and Maree Bonner (The Widow Jones) on vocals and keyboards completing the band's line-up.

=== 2000–2005: Bring It On!, Paging Mr. Strike and On Ice ===
Their first release under this arrangement was the song "Mutha Fukka on a Motorcycle". The lyrics were based on something sung by a party guest at one of the member's homes.

In September 2000, they released their debut studio album, Bring It On, via Mushroom Records.

In 2002, the band performed at numerous Australian music festivals, including Big Day Out in Sydney and Melbourne, Homebake, Livid, the Woodford Folk Festival and Gone South.

Their second album Paging Mr. Strike was released in 2002, containing the band's most popular single, "Rollercoaster", which displayed more radio-friendly lyrics and was used in a commercial for Just Jeans. In 2003 the album was followed by a two-disc edition titled 2nd Page for Mr. Strike, which contained a second disc of remixes and rare tracks.

The group caused some controversy for their wild live performances which often involved both male and female nudity, light bondage gear and implied sexual intercourse with their instruments. After a Student Union organised performance at the University of Melbourne, fellow Victorian universities RMIT University and Swinburne University of Technology cancelled their scheduled performances because of the band's lewd behaviour at Melbourne University. This did not stop other Australian universities in New South Wales, Queensland, Western Australia and Tasmania allowing the band to perform on their campuses and did not stop Melbourne University hiring the band again the following year.

The Widow Jones left the group in 2004 and was replaced by Connie Mitchell (Feyonce), who later became known as the lead singer of Sneaky Sound System. Pinky Beecroft moved to Melbourne to get away from the band and to deal with drug-related health problems. The band's last album, On Ice, was released the same year and was met with a relatively muted response and the band decided to break up the following year. Issues listed as contributing to the break up include burn out, excessive drug use and creative differences.

=== 2005–present: After the split ===
Following the split, several band members transitioned to new projects:

- Pinky Beecroft formed Pinky Beecroft and the White Russians, whose name was later shortened to just The White Russians.
- 3kShort tours with White Knuckle Fever a duet he formed with Celia Curtis of Circus Bizarre and performs with Vashti Hughes in her show Mum's In.
- LoveShark formed the Outer Space Cowboys with 3kShort and played gigs around Sydney.
- Chit Chat Von Loopin Stab became a TV Presenter on Foxtel and now works as a film director on the Stories of Our Town project
- KK Juggy has created and starred in several of her own cabaret shows as well as appearing in other musical theatre productions, film and TV. For two years, she was a singer and a ring mistress for the highly regarded circus troupe Circus Oz. She went on to release an album of jazz and blues classics with her father Dick Hughes, which toured Australia. She released an album of music with her band the Honky Tonk Shonks and has more recently been seen with her blues psychedelic thrash trio, The Loud Hailers.
- Bryan Ferrysexual (Glenn Abbott) had another band The Bryan Ferrysexual Experience which broke up shortly after MGF did. He later formed Super Massive with singer/songwriter Malina Hamilton-Smith.
- Feyonce (Connie Mitchell) has since gone on to be one of the lead singers of the Sydney-based band Sneaky Sound System.

On 7 August 2024, it was announced that the band were to reform as one of four support acts for TISM's Death to Art Tour, alongside The Mavis's, Ben Lee and Eskimo Joe. On 11 October, the reformed MGF performed a secret warmup show at the King Street Hotel in Newcastle, which was also the band's first show in 19 years. Dormand posted to social media on 20 October that the band would not be playing further shows after the TISM tour.

== Members ==
- Bryan Ferrysexual (Glenn Abbott)—drums
- Chit Chat Von Loopin Stab (Glenn Dormand)—keyboard and vocals
- KK Juggy (Christa Hughes)—vocals
- LoveShark (Warrick Leggo)—guitar
- Pinky Beecroft (Matt Ford)—vocals and keyboards
- 3kShort (Ross Johnston)—bass, guitar and keyboard
- The Widow Jones (Maree Bonner)—vocals and keyboard (1997-2004, 2024)
- Feyonce (Connie Mitchell)—vocals (2004–2005)
- Jack Hammer (Guy Fleming)—vocals and keyboard (1997)
- Chris Fegan—guitar (1997)

== Discography ==
=== Studio albums ===
| Title | Details | Peak chart positions | Certifications |
| Title | Details | AUS | Certifications |
|---|---|---|---|
| Bring It On! | Released: 29 September 2000; Format: CD; Label: Sputnik/Mushroom (MUSH33288-2) | 78 | |
| Paging Mr. Strike | Released: 26 August 2002; Format: CD; Label: Sputnik/Mushroom (33565-2) | 6 | ARIA: Platinum |
| On Ice | Released: 18 October 2004; Format: CD; Label: Sputnik/Mushroom (33826 - 2) | 36 | |

=== Compilation albums ===
| Title | Details |
|---|---|
| Unsound Sounds | Released: 1997; Format: CD; Label: Reach Around Records |
| The Essential Hits | Released: 13 August 2010; Format: CD, digital download; Label: Warner Music Australia |

=== Extended plays ===
| Title | EP details | Peak chart positions |
| Title | EP details | AUS |
|---|---|---|
| Love Comes to an End | Released: 1997; Label: Mushroom Distribution Services (MGF001); Format: CD | — |
| Impossible Love | Released: January 2000; Label: Sputnik/Mushroom (MUSH01927-2); Format: CD | 78 |
| For the Ladies | Released: January 2002; Label: Mushroom/Sputnik (02066-2); Format: CD | 31 |

=== Singles ===
List of singles as lead artist and chart position
| Title | Year | Peak chart positions | | Album |
| Title | Year | AUS | Triple J Hottest 100 | Album |
|---|---|---|---|---|
| "Isaac or Fuzz" | 1997 | — (Note: "Isaac or Fuzz" was a radio only single and ineligible to chart in 1997) | — | Love Comes to an End |
| "Impossible Dream" | 2000 | — | 16 | Bring It On! |
| "Unsent Letter" | 2000 | — | 16 | Bring It On! |
| "Mutha Fukka on a Motorcycle" | 2000 | — | 67 | Bring It On! |
| "Summer" | 2001 | — | — | Bring It On! |
| "The Girl of My Dreams (Is Giving Me Nightmares)" | 2002 | 31 | — | Paging Mr Strike |
| "Rollercoaster" | 2003 | 38 | 6 | Paging Mr Strike |
| "Pussytown" | 2003 | — | 8 | Paging Mr Strike |
| "Take It Slow" | 2003 | — | 59 | Paging Mr Strike |
| "You've Ruined All My Favourite Songs" | 2004 | 76 | — | On Ice |
| "What the Fuck?" | 2004 | — | 34 | On Ice |

== Awards and nominations ==
=== ARIA Music Awards ===
The ARIA Music Awards is an annual awards ceremony held by the Australian Recording Industry Association (ARIA). They commenced in 1987.

| Year | Nominee / work | Award | Result | Ref. |
|---|---|---|---|---|
| 2002 | "Girl of My Dreams (Is Giving Me Nightmares)" | Breakthrough Artist - Single | Nominated | |
